= 2020–21 NBL regular season =

The regular season of the 2020–21 NBL season, the 43rd season of the National Basketball League (Australia), started in mid-January, with nine teams participating.

== Games ==
=== Round 1 ===
15 January 2021	Adelaide 36ers	65–89	Melbourne United	Adelaide Entertainment Centre, Adelaide
19:00	Scoring by quarter: 22–18, 17–19, 13–26, 13–26
ESPN	Pts: Johnson 27; Rebs: Giddey 7 Asts: Giddey, Sloan 4	boxscore report	Pts: Goulding, Lual-Acuil 16; Rebs: Lual-Acuil 12; Asts: Hopson 4	Attendance: 6,539; Referees: Michael Aylen, Damian Lyons, James Griguol

16 January 2021	Brisbane Bullets	84–90	The Hawks	Nissan Arena, Brisbane
16:30	Scoring by quarter: 23–23, 15–18, 21–21, 25–28
SBS Viceland	Pts: Sobey 19; Rebs: Froling 12; Asts: Froling 4	boxscore report	Pts: Froling 19; Rebs: Bairstow, Simon 8 Asts: Naar 5	Attendance: 1,746; Referees: Vaughan Mayberry, Marc Mill, Ruben Woolcock

16 January 2021	Cairns Taipans	87–86	Sydney Kings	Cairns Pop-Up Arena, Cairns
19:00	Scoring by quarter: 24–30, 26–21, 14–19, 23–16
ESPN	Pts: Machado 17; Rebs: Oliver 11; Asts: Machado 8	boxscore report	Pts: Ware 18; Rebs: Martin 8 Asts: Bruce 4	Attendance: 1,919; Referees: Chris Reid, Nathan Durant, Daniel Battye

17 January 2021	Adelaide 36ers	116–108(2OT)	South East Melbourne Phoenix	Adelaide Entertainment Centre, Adelaide
14:30	Scoring by quarter: 19–18, 28–25, 23–31, 19–15, Overtime: 10–10, 17–9
SBS Viceland	Pts: Johnson 33; Rebs: Humphries 12; Asts: Giddey 7	boxscore report	Pts: Creek 30; Rebs: Wetzell 10; Asts: Sykes 11	Attendance: 6,518; Referees: Michael Aylen, Damian Lyons, Daniel Troy

18 January 2021	Cairns Taipans	76–92	The Hawks	Cairns Pop-Up Arena, Cairns
18:30	Scoring by quarter: 19–31, 22–19, 19–19, 16–23
ESPN	Pts: Deng 20; Rebs: Oliver 12; Asts: Machado 11	boxscore report	Pts: Harvey 25; Rebs: Simon 12; Asts: Harvey 7	Attendance: 1,808; Referees: Chris Reid, Daniel Battye, Mitch Hare

=== Round 2 ===
20 January 2021	Adelaide 36ers	83–89	South East Melbourne Phoenix	Adelaide Entertainment Centre, Adelaide
19:00	Scoring by quarter: 19–21, 24–26, 18–24, 22–18
ESPN	Pts: Humphries 20; Rebs: Johnson 10; Asts: Johnson 4	boxscore report	Pts: Sykes 24; Rebs: Moore 12; Asts: Sykes 7	Attendance: 6,946; Referees: Michael Aylen, Damian Lyons, Hugh Starkey

21 January 2021	Brisbane Bullets	82–90	The Hawks	Nissan Arena, Brisbane
18:30	Scoring by quarter: 23–13, 15–25, 24–27, 16–19
ESPN	Pts: Sobey 24; Rebs: Law 12; Asts: Cadee 9	boxscore report	Pts: Harvey 31; Rebs: Ogilvy, Simon 9 Asts: Jessup 6	Attendance: 1,591; Referees: Vaughan Mayberry, Marc Mill, Alex McEwan

22 January 2021	Adelaide 36ers	94–91(OT)	New Zealand Breakers	Adelaide Entertainment Centre, Adelaide
19:00	Scoring by quarter: 29–19, 15–23, 18–28, 20–12, Overtime: 12–9
ESPN	Pts: Humphries 24; Rebs: Humphries 11; Asts: Johnson, Sloan 3	boxscore report	Pts: T. Webster 34; Rebs: Delany 9 Asts: T. Webster 6	Attendance: 6,589; Referees: Chris Reid, Damian Lyons, Daniel Troy

23 January 2021	Cairns Taipans	91–99	Sydney Kings	Cairns Pop-Up Arena, Cairns
19:00	Scoring by quarter: 22–23, 15–23, 34–26, 20–27
ESPN	Pts: Oliver 27; Rebs: Oliver 10; Asts: Machado 9	boxscore report	Pts: Martin, Ware 22; Rebs: Martin 11; Asts: Bruce, Moller 4	Attendance: 1,930; Referees: Vaughan Mayberry, Mitch Hare, Ruben Woolcock

24 January 2021	Perth Wildcats	88–76	South East Melbourne Phoenix	RAC Arena, Perth
14:00	Scoring by quarter: 23–17, 15–25, 22–15, 28–19
SBS Viceland	Pts: Cotton 27; Rebs: Mooney 15; Asts: Cotton 7	boxscore report	Pts: Creek 17; Rebs: Wetzell 11; Asts: Sykes, Wetzell 4	Attendance: 7,150; Referees: Craig Copes, Mark Grist, Travis Stewart

25 January 2021	Cairns Taipans	85–87	Melbourne United	Cairns Pop-Up Arena, Cairns
18:30	Scoring by quarter: 21–29, 24–22, 17–18, 23–18
ESPN	Pts: Machado 19; Rebs: Oliver 13; Asts: Machado 6	boxscore report	Pts: Landale 19; Rebs: Lual-Acuil 11; Asts: Ili, McCarron 4	Attendance: 1,896; Referees: Chris Reid, Daniel Battye, Ruben Woolcock

=== Round 3 ===
26 January 2021	Brisbane Bullets	90–87	Sydney Kings	Nissan Arena, Brisbane
14:00	Scoring by quarter: 26–28, 21–17, 21–19, 22–23
SBS Viceland	Pts: Law 27; Rebs: Harrison 11; Asts: Sobey 7	boxscore report	Pts: Martin 26; Rebs: Martin 11; Asts: Bruce, Louzada, Moller, Ware 3	Attendance: 3,406; Referees: Chris Reid, Marc Mill, Alex McEwan

27 January 2021	Adelaide 36ers	88–78	New Zealand Breakers	Adelaide Entertainment Centre, Adelaide
19:00	Scoring by quarter: 21–14, 18–19, 26–22, 23–23
ESPN	Pts: Humphries 21; Rebs: Giddey 10; Asts: Giddey 8	boxscore report	Pts: Delany 19; Rebs: Iverson 10; Asts: T. Webster 7	Attendance: 5,706; Referees: Vaughan Mayberry, Nathan Durant, Daniel Battye

28 January 2021	Cairns Taipans	70–90	The Hawks	Cairns Pop-Up Arena, Cairns
18:30	Scoring by quarter: 12–19, 24–26, 19–16, 15–29
ESPN	Pts: Oliver 20; Rebs: Oliver 11; Asts: Machado 7	boxscore report	Pts: Harvey 21; Rebs: Simon 8 Asts: Simon 5	Attendance: 1,849; Referees: Chris Reid, Mitch Hare, Ruben Woolcock

29 January 2021	Perth Wildcats	89–90	South East Melbourne Phoenix	RAC Arena, Perth
18:30	Scoring by quarter: 17–23, 24–19, 26–29, 22–19
ESPN	Pts: Cotton 32; Rebs: Mooney 13; Asts: Cotton 6	boxscore report	Pts: Creek 24; Rebs: Creek, Moore 7 Asts: Sykes 8	Attendance: 7,150; Referees: Michael Aylen, James Griguol, Craig Copes

30 January 2021	Brisbane Bullets	105–103(OT)	Cairns Taipans	Nissan Arena, Brisbane
16:30	Scoring by quarter: 19–23, 21–32, 21–17, 29–18, Overtime: 15–13
SBS Viceland	Pts: Sobey 30; Rebs: Law 11; Asts: Sobey 5	boxscore report	Pts: Machado 23; Rebs: Oliver 8 Asts: Machado 10	Attendance: 4,065; Referees: Chris Reid, Nathan Durrant, Marc Mill

30 January 2021	Adelaide 36ers	85–80	Sydney Kings	Adelaide Entertainment Centre, Adelaide
19:30	Scoring by quarter: 22–24, 21–12, 19–15, 23–29
ESPN	Pts: Humphries 27; Rebs: Humphries 9 Asts: Giddey, Johnson, Sloan 4	boxscore report	Pts: Vasiljevic 28; Rebs: Moller 9 Asts: Ware 6	Attendance: 7,087; Referees: Vaughan Mayberry, Damian Lyons, Daniel Troy

31 January 2021	Melbourne United	96–90	South East Melbourne Phoenix	Bendigo Stadium, Bendigo
15:00	Scoring by quarter: 22–22, 25–18, 19–14, 30–36
SBS Viceland	Pts: White 22; Rebs: Landale 7 Asts: McCarron 6	boxscore report	Pts: Sykes 24; Rebs: Moore 10; Asts: Creek, Sykes 7	Attendance: 2,000; Referees: Vaughan Mayberry, Damian Lyons, Daniel Battye

=== Round 4 ===
5 February 2021	Brisbane Bullets	96–109	Melbourne United	Nissan Arena, Brisbane
18:30	Scoring by quarter: 31–26, 21–25, 22–24, 22–34
ESPN	Pts: Sobey 27; Rebs: Johnson, Law 7 Asts: Law 4	boxscore report	Pts: Goulding 27; Rebs: Landale 12; Asts: McCarron 8	Attendance: 2,234; Referees: Vaughan Mayberry, Marc Mill, Alex McEwan

6 February 2021	Cairns Taipans	79–85	New Zealand Breakers	Cairns Pop-Up Arena, Cairns
16:30	Scoring by quarter: 20–25, 24–16, 22–18, 13–26
SBS Viceland	Pts: Machado 25; Rebs: Oliver 10; Asts: Machado 12	boxscore report	Pts: T. Webster 25; Rebs: T. Webster 11; Asts: T. Webster 5	Attendance: 1,891; Referees: James Boyer, Vaughan Mayberry, Marc Mill

6 February 2021	Adelaide 36ers	75–94	Sydney Kings	Adelaide Entertainment Centre, Adelaide
19:30	Scoring by quarter: 18–21, 21–27, 12–17, 24–29
ESPN	Pts: Johnson 21; Rebs: Humphries 8 Asts: Giddey 4	boxscore report	Pts: Ware 27; Rebs: Hunter 11; Asts: Bruce 7	Attendance: 7,317; Referees: Michael Aylen, Nathan Durant, Hugh Starkey

7 February 2021	South East Melbourne Phoenix	98–82	The Hawks	State Basketball Centre, Melbourne
15:00	Scoring by quarter: 23–23, 22–16, 35–22, 18–21
SBS Viceland	Pts: Adnam, Creek, Gliddon, Moore, Sykes 15; Rebs: Moore 14; Asts: Sykes 7	boxscore report	Pts: Adel 17; Rebs: Froling 11; Asts: Adell, Naar, Simon 3	Attendance: 2,175; Referees: Damian Lyons, Mitch Hare, Ruben Woolcock

7 February 2021	Melbourne United	75–71	Perth Wildcats	Bendigo Stadium, Bendigo
17:00	Scoring by quarter: 13–14, 24–28, 19–14, 19–15
SBS Viceland	Pts: Landale 16; Rebs: White 8 Asts: Hopson 6	boxscore report	Pts: Cotton 24; Rebs: Cotton, Mooney, Wagstaff 7 Asts: Cotton 6	Attendance: 1,953; Referees: Chris Reid, Daniel Battye, Daniel Troy

8 February 2021	Cairns Taipans	84–69	New Zealand Breakers	Cairns Pop-Up Arena, Cairns
18:30	Scoring by quarter: 22–16, 21–16, 23–18, 18–19
ESPN	Pts: Deng 21; Rebs: Oliver 11; Asts: Machado 11	boxscore report	Pts: T. Webster 13; Rebs: Abercrombie 7 Asts: Patterson 4	Attendance: 1,828; Referees: Vaughan Mayberry, Nathan Durant, Marc Mill

=== Round 5 ===
10 February 2021	Illawarra Hawks	88–91	Melbourne United	WIN Entertainment Centre, Wollongong
19:30	Scoring by quarter: 31–36, 24–21, 17–18, 16–18
ESPN	Pts: Jessup 24; Rebs: Froling 11; Asts: Harvey 4	boxscore report	Pts: Hopson 21; Rebs: Hopson 9 Asts: McCarron 7	Attendance: 3,459; Referees: James Boyer, Scott Beker, Mitch Hare

11 February 2021	South East Melbourne Phoenix	75–106	Perth Wildcats	State Basketball Centre, Melbourne
19:30	Scoring by quarter: 16–21, 11–27, 25–25, 23–33
ESPN	Pts: Adnam 24; Rebs: Creek 11; Asts: Adnam 3	boxscore report	Pts: Blanchfield 22; Rebs: Mooney 13; Asts: Cotton 7	Attendance: 1,875; Referees: Chris Reid, Damian Lyons, Ruben Woolcock

12 February 2021	Sydney Kings	84–74	New Zealand Breakers	Qudos Bank Arena, Sydney
19:30	Scoring by quarter: 18–18, 20–20, 26–23, 20–13
ESPN	Pts: Ware 22; Rebs: Martin, Newley 6 Asts: Bruce 4	boxscore report	Pts: C. Webster 25; Rebs: Iverson, T. Webster 10; Asts: T. Webster 4	Attendance: 5,833; Referees: Michael Aylen, Scott Beker, Elliot Green

13 February 2021	Brisbane Bullets	70–85	Adelaide 36ers	Nissan Arena, Brisbane
19:00	Scoring by quarter: 19–16, 13–23, 15–13, 23–33
ESPN	Pts: Sobey 25; Rebs: Law 10; Asts: Johnson, Sobey 2	boxscore report	Pts: Humphries 24; Rebs: Humphries 13; Asts: Giddey 7	Attendance: 4,240; Referees: Vaughan Mayberry, Marc Mill, Alex McEwan

14 February 2021	Sydney Kings	82–85	Illawarra Hawks	Qudos Bank Arena, Sydney
15:00	Scoring by quarter: 20–26, 22–24, 17–11, 23–24
SBS Viceland	Pts: Ware 21; Rebs: Moller 8 Asts: Bruce 9	boxscore report	Pts: Harvey 25; Rebs: Bairstow 10; Asts: Jessup 3	Attendance: 6,534; Referees: James Boyer, Vaughan Mayberry, Elliot Green

14 February 2021	South East Melbourne Phoenix	96–71	Perth Wildcats	State Basketball Centre, Melbourne
17:00	Scoring by quarter: 22–24, 27–14, 24–14, 23–19
SBS Viceland	Pts: Sykes 24; Rebs: Wetzell 10; Asts: Sykes 7	boxscore report	Pts: Mooney 19; Rebs: Mooney 10; Asts: Cotton 9	Attendance: closed event Referees: Chris Reid, Damian Lyons, Ruben Woolcock

15 February 2021	Adelaide 36ers	74–93	Brisbane Bullets	Adelaide Entertainment Centre, Adelaide
19:00	Scoring by quarter: 14–17, 23–30, 18–26, 19–20
ESPN	Pts: Johnson 20; Rebs: Humphries, Johnson 8 Asts: Giddey 8	boxscore	Pts: Law 27; Rebs: Law, Johnson 9 Asts: Cadee, Sobey 5	Attendance: 5,183; Referees: Michael Aylen, Nathan Durant, Daniel Troy

=== NBL Cup ===
==== Round 6 ====
20 February 2021	Cairns Taipans	101–95	Illawarra Hawks	John Cain Arena, Melbourne
15:00	Scoring by quarter: 19–18, 21–27, 28–26, 33–24
ESPN	Pts: Machado 31; Rebs: Machado, Oliver 8 Asts: Machado 6	boxscore report	Pts: Harvey 24; Rebs: Froling 12; Asts: Harvey 6	Attendance: 3,711; Referees: Vaughan Mayberry, Mitch Hare, Ruben Woolcock

20 February 2021	Melbourne United	85–89	Perth Wildcats	John Cain Arena, Melbourne
17:30	Scoring by quarter: 20–20, 17–21, 27–24, 21–24
SBS Viceland	Pts: Landale 20; Rebs: Landale 10; Asts: Hopson, Landale 4	boxscore report	Pts: Cotton 29; Rebs: Mooney 9 Asts: Cotton 7	Attendance: 3,711; Referees: Michael Aylen, Nathan Durant, James Griguol

21 February 2021	South East Melbourne Phoenix	99–83	Brisbane Bullets	John Cain Arena, Melbourne
15:00	Scoring by quarter: 16–27, 28–17, 24–22, 31–17
SBS Viceland	Pts: Creek 29; Rebs: Sykes 10; Asts: Sykes 11	boxscore report	Pts: Hodgson 20; Rebs: Hodgson 9 Asts: Sobey 4	Attendance: 2,566; Referees: Chris Reid, Scott Beker, Travis Stewart

21 February 2021	Sydney Kings	94–77	Adelaide 36ers	John Cain Arena, Melbourne
17:30	Scoring by quarter: 30–22, 18–19, 23–8, 23–18
SBS Viceland	Pts: Ware 23; Rebs: Hunter 9 Asts: Newley 4	boxscore report	Pts: Crocker 15; Rebs: Giddey 7 Asts: Giddey 7	Attendance: 2,566; Referees: Vaughan Mayberry, Damian Lyons, Hugh Starkey

22 February 2021	Illawarra Hawks	102–88	New Zealand Breakers	John Cain Arena, Melbourne
17:00	Scoring by quarter: 21–21, 33–19, 27–24, 21–24
ESPN	Pts: Harvey 22; Rebs: Froling, Simon 6 Asts: Harvey 4	boxscore report	Pts: C. Webster 22; Rebs: Iverson 17; Asts: C. Webster 7	Attendance: 2,313; Referees: Michael Aylen, Mitch Hare, Daniel Battye

22 February 2021	Melbourne United	88–81	Cairns Taipans	John Cain Arena, Melbourne
19:30	Scoring by quarter: 17–25, 18–17, 23–20, 30–19
ESPN	Pts: Landale 18; Rebs: Landale 11; Asts: McCarron 8	boxscore report	Pts: Noi 27; Rebs: Krslovic 7 Asts: Machado 9	Attendance: 2,313; Referees: Vaughan Mayberry, Damian Lyons, Elliot Green

23 February 2021	Sydney Kings	106–113	Perth Wildcats	John Cain Arena, Melbourne
17:00	Scoring by quarter: 30–24, 26–30, 17–32, 33–27
ESPN	Pts: Ware 34; Rebs: Ware 5 Asts: Ware 4	boxscore report	Pts: Cotton, Mooney 30; Rebs: Mooney 16; Asts: Cotton 9	Attendance: 1,079; Referees: Simon Beker, Chris Reid, Alex McEwan

23 February 2021	Adelaide 36ers	99–94	South East Melbourne Phoenix	John Cain Arena, Melbourne
19:30	Scoring by quarter: 19–19, 30–29, 30–18, 20–28
ESPN	Pts: Johnson 27; Rebs: Humphries 11; Asts: Giddey 9	boxscore report	Pts: Creek 23; Rebs: Creek 12; Asts: Creek 8	Attendance: 1,079; Referees: Michael Aylen, James Griguol, Ruben Woolcock

==== Round 7 ====
25 February 2021	Sydney Kings	96–78	New Zealand Breakers	John Cain Arena, Melbourne
17:00	Scoring by quarter: 20–30, 26–6, 22–19, 28–23
ESPN	Pts: Hunter 24; Rebs: Vasiljevic 10; Asts: Ware 5	boxscore report	Pts: C. Webster 24; Rebs: Iverson 6 Asts: T. Webster 5	Attendance: 1,991; Referees: Vaughan Mayberry, James Griguol, Ruben Woolcock

25 February 2021	Adelaide 36ers	73–82	Melbourne United	John Cain Arena, Melbourne
19:30	Scoring by quarter: 8–31, 26–16, 18–17, 21–18
ESPN	Pts: Johnson 14; Rebs: Giddey, Humphries, Johnson 8 Asts: Dech 4	boxscore report	Pts: McCarron 18; Rebs: McCarron 11; Asts: Hopson 4	Attendance: 1,991; Referees: Chris Reid, Damian Lyons, Mitch Hare

26 February 2021	Brisbane Bullets	97–91	Illawarra Hawks	John Cain Arena, Melbourne
17:00	Scoring by quarter: 27–25, 22–26, 28–20, 20–20
ESPN	Pts: Law 29; Rebs: Law 9 Asts: Cadee, Sobey 6	boxscore report	Pts: Jessup 26; Rebs: Bairstow 8 Asts: Simon 4	Attendance: 809; Referees: Michael Aylen, James Griguol, Travis Stewart

26 February 2021	Cairns Taipans	69–89	Perth Wildcats	John Cain Arena, Melbourne
19:30	Scoring by quarter: 17–25, 24–18, 9–18, 19–28
ESPN	Pts: Oliver 19; Rebs: Oliver 14; Asts: Machado 8	boxscore report	Pts: Cotton 23; Rebs: Mooney 12; Asts: Cotton 8	Attendance: 809; Referees: Scott Beker, Nathan Durant, Daniel Battye

27 February 2021	Adelaide 36ers	62–106	New Zealand Breakers	John Cain Arena, Melbourne
17:30	Scoring by quarter: 6–32, 24–38, 21–22, 11–24
SBS Viceland	Pts: McVeigh 20; Rebs: Johnson 8 Asts: Johnson 4	boxscore report	Pts: C. Webster, T. Webster 29; Rebs: Iverson 8 Asts: T. Webster 11	Attendance: 4,206; Referees: Vaughan Mayberry, Daniel Battye, Mitch Hare

27 February 2021	Melbourne United	83–80	Sydney Kings	John Cain Arena, Melbourne
20:00	Scoring by quarter: 16–28, 18–15, 24–17, 25–20
ESPN	Pts: Landale 20; Rebs: Lual-Acuil 10; Asts: McCarron 6	boxscore report	Pts: Vasiljevic 22; Rebs: Newley 8 Asts: Ware 5	Attendance: 4,206; Referees: Michael Aylen, Nathan Durant, James Griguol

28 February 2021	South East Melbourne Phoenix	93–76	Illawarra Hawks	John Cain Arena, Melbourne
14:00	Scoring by quarter: 25–13, 20–24, 28–18, 20–21
SBS Viceland	Pts: Creek 25; Rebs: Creek 6 Asts: Adnam 11	boxscore report	Pts: Harvey 14; Rebs: Adel 7 Asts: Jessup 4	Attendance: 3,195; Referees: Chris Reid, Damian Lyons, Alex McEwan

28 February 2021	Brisbane Bullets	115–99	Cairns Taipans	John Cain Arena, Melbourne
16:30	Scoring by quarter: 25–28, 35–23, 26–22, 29–22
SBS Viceland	Pts: Sobey 30; Rebs: Froling 11; Asts: Cadee 6	boxscore report	Pts: Machado 26; Rebs: Oliver 6 Asts: Scott Machado 6	Attendance: 3,195; Referees: Scott Beker, Mitch Hare, Elliot Green

==== Round 8 ====
3 March 2021	New Zealand Breakers	97–92	Brisbane Bullets	State Basketball Centre, Melbourne
17:00	Scoring by quarter: 27–12, 20–23, 24–31, 26–26
ESPN	Pts: C. Webster 21; Rebs: T. Webster 9 Asts: C. Webster, T. Webster 4	boxscore report	Pts: Law 19; Rebs: Law 10; Asts: Cadee 6	Attendance: 2,257; Referees: Michael Aylen, Mitch Hare, Ruben Woolcock

3 March 2021	Perth Wildcats	93–92	South East Melbourne Phoenix	State Basketball Centre, Melbourne
19:30	Scoring by quarter: 26–16, 28–22, 20–29, 19–25
ESPN	Pts: Cotton 28; Rebs: Mooney 11; Asts: Norton 8	boxscore report	Pts: Adnam 28; Rebs: Creek 8 Asts: Creek 8	Attendance: 2,257; Referees: Vaughan Mayberry, James Griguol, Hugh Starkey

4 March 2021	Cairns Taipans	96–92	Sydney Kings	State Basketball Centre, Melbourne
17:00	Scoring by quarter: 26–28, 25–13, 22–26, 23–25
ESPN	Pts: Machado 24; Rebs: Krslovic 10; Asts: Machado 4	boxscore report	Pts: Vasiljevic 32; Rebs: Hunter 6 Asts: Moller, Ware 4	Attendance: 1,355; Referees: Chris Reid, Damian Lyon, Alex McEwan

4 March 2021	Illawarra Hawks	98–89	Adelaide 36ers	State Basketball Centre, Melbourne
19:30	Scoring by quarter: 21–27, 25–21, 26–24, 26–17
ESPN	Pts: Harvey 24; Rebs: Simon 9 Asts: Harvey 6	boxscore report	Pts: Crocker 23; Rebs: Johnson 8 Asts: Giddey 9	Attendance: 1,355; Referees: Simon Beker, Nathan Durant, Daniel Battye

5 March 2021	Perth Wildcats	92–95	Brisbane Bullets	John Cain Arena, Melbourne
17:00	Scoring by quarter: 22–29, 26–23, 20–21, 24–22
ESPN	Pts: Cotton 29; Rebs: Mooney 9 Asts: Cotton, Jervis, Mooney 4	boxscore report	Pts: Sobey 31; Rebs: Hodgson 9 Asts: Sobey 4	Attendance: 3,421; Referees: Michael Aylen, James Griguol, Elliot Green

5 March 2021	New Zealand Breakers	84–87	Melbourne United	John Cain Arena, Melbourne
19:30	Scoring by quarter: 20–23, 19–16, 19–20, 26–28
ESPN	Pts: T. Webster 32; Rebs: Delany 9 Asts: Delany, C. Webster, T. Webster, Weeks 2	boxscore report	Pts: Landale 23; Rebs: McCarron 7 Asts: McCarron 7	Attendance: 3,421; Referees: Vaughan Mayberry, Nathan Durant, Mitch Hare

6 March 2021	Adelaide 36ers	81–71	Cairns Taipans	John Cain Arena, Melbourne
17:30	Scoring by quarter: 19–21, 22–17, 18–18, 22–15
SBS Viceland	Pts: Johnson 30; Rebs: Johnson 9 Asts: Giddey 8	boxscore report	Pts: Krslovic 12; Rebs: Machado, Oliver 6 Asts: Machado 7	Attendance: 3,708; Referees: Chris Reid, Ruben Woolcock, Alex McEwan

6 March 2021	South East Melbourne Phoenix	85–91	Sydney Kings	John Cain Arena, Melbourne
20:00	Scoring by quarter: 14–19, 33–24, 18–30, 20–18
ESPN	Pts: Creek 22; Rebs: Creek 9 Asts: Adnam 4	boxscore report	Pts: Vasiljevic 19; Rebs: Ware 10; Asts: Ware 6	Attendance: 3,708; Referees: Simon Beker, James Griguol, Daniel Battye

7 March 2021	Melbourne United	88–96	Brisbane Bullets	John Cain Arena, Melbourne
14:00	Scoring by quarter: 16–25, 22–22, 29–24, 21–25
SBS Viceland	Pts: Goulding 21; Rebs: Landale 12; Asts: Baba 4	boxscore report	Pts: Hodgson 24; Rebs: Law 15; Asts: Sobey 5	Attendance: 3,696; Referees: Michael Aylen, Damian Lyons, Elliot Green

7 March 2021	Illawarra Hawks	70–87	Perth Wildcats	John Cain Arena, Melbourne
16:30	Scoring by quarter: 17–28, 14–25, 15–21, 24–13
SBS Viceland	Pts: Harvey 17; Rebs: Simon 7 Asts: Simon 3	boxscore report	Pts: Cotton 18; Rebs: Mooney 10; Asts: Norton 6	Attendance: 3,696; Referees: Vaughan Mayberry, Mitch Hare, Daniel Troy

==== Round 9 ====
10 March 2021	New Zealand Breakers	86–83	Cairns Taipans	John Cain Arena, Melbourne
17:00	Scoring by quarter: 24–11, 22–21, 14–20, 16–21
ESPN	Pts: Abercrombie 20; Rebs: Iverson 11; Asts: T. Webster 4	boxscore report	Pts: Oliver 19; Rebs: Oliver 7 Asts: Machado 4	Attendance: 3,675; Referees: Michael Aylen, Nathan Durant, Travis Stewart

10 March 2021	South East Melbourne Phoenix	97–92(OT)	Melbourne United	John Cain Arena, Melbourne
19:30	Scoring by quarter: 29–24, 21–18, 20–21, 14–21, Overtime: 13–8
ESPN	Pts: Creek 31; Rebs: Creek 10; Asts: Adnam 8	boxscore report	Pts: Goulding, Landale 9 Rebs: Lual-Acuil 9 Asts: Ili, McCarron 5	Attendance: 3,675; Referees: Vaughan Mayberry, Damian Lyons, Daniel Troy

11 March 2021	Brisbane Bullets	109–104	Adelaide 36ers	John Cain Arena, Melbourne
17:00	Scoring by quarter: 25–29, 31–33, 27–21, 26–21
ESPN	Pts: Sobey 30; Rebs: Hodgson 7 Asts: Law 5	boxscore report	Pts: Johnson 29; Rebs: Johnson 9 Asts: Giddey 11	Attendance: 997; Referees: Scott Beker, James Griguol, Ruben Woolcock

11 March 2021	Sydney Kings	69–89	Illawarra Hawks	John Cain Arena, Melbourne
19:30	Scoring by quarter: 24–24, 20–21, 8–25, 17–19
ESPN	Pts: Vasiljevic 12; Rebs: Moller 6 Asts: Bruce, Moller 4	boxscore report	Pts: Froling 20; Rebs: Bairstow, Froling 6 Asts: Harvey 4	Attendance: 997; Referees: Chris Reid, Nathan Durant, Elliot Green

12 March 2021	Perth Wildcats	85–75	New Zealand Breakers	John Cain Arena, Melbourne
17:00	Scoring by quarter: 12–19, 23–17, 33–17, 17–22
ESPN	Pts: Cotton 24; Rebs: Mooney 12; Asts: Cotton 7	boxscore report	Pts: Delany 30; Rebs: Iverson 8 Asts: T. Webster 7	Attendance: 2,478; Referees: Vaughan Mayberry, Daniel Battye, James Griguol

12 March 2021	Cairns Taipans	81–85	South East Melbourne Phoenix	John Cain Arena, Melbourne
19:30	Scoring by quarter: 14–20, 22–27, 19–18, 26–20
ESPN	Pts: Machado 24; Rebs: Krslovic 8 Asts: Djeric, Machado 3	boxscore report	Pts: Creek 21; Rebs: Gliddon, Wetzell 8 Asts: Gliddon 5	Attendance: 2,478; Referees: Michael Aylen, Hugh Starkey, Daniel Troy

13 March 2021	Brisbane Bullets	108–119	Sydney Kings	John Cain Arena, Melbourne
17:30	Scoring by quarter: 24–23, 32–25, 24–38, 28–33
SBS Viceland	Pts: Sobey 35; Rebs: Hodgson, Law 9 Asts: Cadee, Sobey 6	boxscore report	Pts: Ware 25; Rebs: Hunter 8 Asts: Ware 10	Attendance: 4,183; Referees: Scott Beker, Damian Lyons, Ruben Woolcock

13 March 2021	Illawarra Hawks	77–69	Melbourne United	John Cain Arena, Melbourne
20:00	Scoring by quarter: 20–21, 18–22, 18–17, 21–9
ESPN	Pts: Harvey 23; Rebs: Adel, Harvey, Jessup 6 Asts: Harvey 4	boxscore report	Pts: McCarron 16; Rebs: Landale 8 Asts: McCarron 4	Attendance: 4,183; Referees: Chris Reid, Mitch Hare, James Griguol

14 March 2021	New Zealand Breakers	89–103	South East Melbourne Phoenix	John Cain Arena, Melbourne
14:00	Scoring by quarter: 23–29, 23–24, 19–25, 25–25
ESPN	Pts: Delany 24; Rebs: Iverson 8 Asts: T. Webster 5	boxscore report	Pts: Adnam, Creek 21; Rebs: Moore 5 Asts: Adnam 7	Attendance: 4,019; Referees: Vaughan Mayberry, Damian Lyons, Elliot Green

14 March 2021	Perth Wildcats	97–88	Adelaide 36ers	John Cain Arena, Melbourne
16:30	Scoring by quarter: 15–28, 24–32, 25–8, 33–20
SBS Viceland	Pts: Cotton 34; Rebs: Mooney 16; Asts: Cotton 7	boxscore report	Pts: Paul 25; Rebs: Giddey 8 Asts: Giddey 13	Attendance: 4,019; Referees: Michael Aylen, Daniel Battye, Ruben Woolcock

=== Round 10 ===
19 March 2021	Sydney Kings	103–75	Melbourne United	Qudos Bank Arena, Sydney
19:30	Scoring by quarter: 25–21, 35–18, 27–19, 16–17
ESPN	Pts: Hunter 18; Rebs: Martin, Moller 6 Asts: Moller, Ware 6	boxscore report	Pts: Landale 18; Rebs: Ili, Landale 7 Asts: Goulding 4	Attendance: 5,089; Referees: Michael Aylen, James Boyer, Ruben Woolcock

19 March 2021	Perth Wildcats	93–75	Cairns Taipans	RAC Arena, Perth
18:30	Scoring by quarter: 31–19, 24–21, 18–17, 20–18
ESPN	Pts: Cotton 28; Rebs: Mooney 8 Asts: Cotton 5	boxscore report	Pts: Machado 16; Rebs: Noi 9 Asts: Noi 3	Attendance: 9,997; Referees: Chris Reid, Mitch Hare, Craig Copes

20 March 2021	South East Melbourne Phoenix	96–89(OT)	Adelaide 36ers	John Cain Arena, Melbourne
17:30	Scoring by quarter: 20–25, 22–22, 17–15, 23–20, Overtime: 14–7
SBS Viceland	Pts: Moore 23; Rebs: Moore 10; Asts: Moore 5	boxscore report	Pts: Paul 29; Rebs: Giddey 10; Asts: Giddey 7	Attendance: 1,682; Referees: Scott Beker, Damian Lyons, Elliot Green

20 March 2021	Brisbane Bullets	88–67	New Zealand Breakers	Nissan Arena, Brisbane
19:00	Scoring by quarter: 21–19, 23–20, 20–9, 24–19
ESPN	Pts: Froling 20; Rebs: Hodgson 10; Asts: Cadee 4	boxscore report	Pts: T. Webster 19; Rebs: Delany 9 Asts: T. Webster 5	Attendance: 3,386; Referees: Vaughan Mayberry, Nathan Durant, Marc Mill

21 March 2021	Melbourne United	75–65	Illawarra Hawks	John Cain Arena, Melbourne
15:00	Scoring by quarter: 19–19, 20–16, 16–13, 20–17
SBS Viceland	Pts: Landale 19; Rebs: McCarron 11; Asts: Goulding 5	boxscore report	Pts: Jessup 13; Rebs: Froling 11; Asts: Adel, Harvey, Naar 2	Attendance: 2,552; Referees: Michael Aylen, James Boyer, Daniel Troy

21 March 2021	Sydney Kings	75–73	Cairns Taipans	Qudos Bank Arena, Sydney
17:00	Scoring by quarter: 20–21, 23–16, 12–20, 20–16
SBS Viceland	Pts: Martin, Ware 16; Rebs: Moller 8 Asts: Louzada, Martin, Moller, Vasiljevic, Ware 2	boxscore report	Pts: Machado 21; Rebs: Oliver 7 Asts: Machado 7	Attendance: 5,187; Referees: Scott Beker, Damian Lyons, Daniel Battye

22 March 2021	Perth Wildcats	92–82	Adelaide 36ers	RAC Arena, Perth
18:30	Scoring by quarter: 24–24, 27–21, 22–20, 19–17
SBS Viceland	Pts: Cotton 36; Rebs: Mooney 14; Asts: Cotton 6	boxscore report	Pts: Johnson 19; Rebs: Johnson 8 Asts: Paul 5	Attendance: 9,550; Referees: Vaughan Mayberry, Mitch Hare, Mark Grist

=== Round 11 ===
25 March 2021	New Zealand Breakers	79–82	Melbourne United	Bendigo Stadium, Bendigo
19:30	Scoring by quarter: 26–26, 28–12, 11–21, 14–23
ESPN	Pts: Delany 17; Rebs: Abercrombie, T. Webster 7 Asts: T. Webster 7	boxscore report	Pts: Ili, McCarron 16; Rebs: McCarron 7 Asts: McCarron 7	Attendance: 1,150; Referees: Chris Reid, Damian Lyons, Elliot Green

26 March 2021	Perth Wildcats	81–70	Illawarra Hawks	RAC Arena, Perth
18:30	Scoring by quarter: 17–26, 22–15, 21–17, 21–12
ESPN	Pts: Cotton 22; Rebs: Mooney 16; Asts: Cotton 5	boxscore report	Pts: Jessup 15; Rebs: Harvey 8 Asts: Adel, Naar, Ogilvy 2	Attendance: 10,216; Referees: Michael Aylen, Mitch Hare, Mark Grist

27 March 2021	Brisbane Bullets	76–81(OT)	New Zealand Breakers	Nissan Arena, Brisbane
16:30	Scoring by quarter: 13–12, 18–22, 20–22, 18–13, Overtime: 7–12
SBS Viceland	Pts: Drmic 25; Rebs: Harrison 16; Asts: Froling 3	boxscore report	Pts: T. Webster 27; Rebs: Iverson 20; Asts: T. Webster 10	Attendance: 2,935; Referees: Vaughan Mayberry, Marc Mill, Alex McEwan

27 March 2021	South East Melbourne Phoenix	60–80	Melbourne United	John Cain Arena, Melbourne
20:00	Scoring by quarter: 21–18, 16–23, 13–24, 10–15
ESPN	Pts: Gliddon 13; Rebs: Moore 7 Asts: Gliddon 4	boxscore report	Pts: Goulding 25; Rebs: Peatling 12; Asts: McCarron 6	Attendance: 3,370; Referees: Chris Reid, Damian Lyons, Ruben Woolcock

28 March 2021	Sydney Kings	65–89	Perth Wildcats	Qudos Bank Arena, Sydney
15:00	Scoring by quarter: 19–21, 25–25, 9–19, 12–24
SBS Viceland	Pts: Martin 18; Rebs: Moller 7 Asts: Ware 6	boxscore report	Pts: Cotton 29; Rebs: Mooney 18; Asts: Cotton, Mooney 4	Attendance: 5,067; Referees: Michael Aylen, James Griguol, Mitch Hare

28 March 2021	Cairns Taipans	79–65	Adelaide 36ers	Cairns Pop-Up Arena, Cairns
16:00	Scoring by quarter: 24–18, 22–16, 12–16, 21–15
SBS Viceland	Pts: Oliver 19; Rebs: Oliver 9 Asts: Machado 6	boxscore report	Pts: Johnson 21; Rebs: Johnson 8 Asts: Dech 5	Attendance: 1,945; Referees: Vaughan Mayberry, Marc Mill, Alex McEwan

29 March 2021	Illawarra Hawks	96–72	Brisbane Bullets	WIN Entertainment Centre, Wollongong
19:30	Scoring by quarter: 28–20, 26–14, 18–16, 24–22
ESPN	Pts: Harvey 28; Rebs: Adel 11; Asts: Adel 6	boxscore report	Pts: Cadee 17; Rebs: Hodgson 9 Asts: Sobey 6	Attendance: 2,521; Referees: Scott Beker, James Boyer, James Griguol

=== Round 12 ===
1 April 2021	Illawarra Hawks	63–95	South East Melbourne Phoenix	WIN Entertainment Centre, Wollongong
19:30	Scoring by quarter: 25–15, 13–24, 8–30, 17–26
ESPN	Pts: Jessup 21; Rebs: Froling 11; Asts: Harvey, Naar, Ogilvy, Simon 2	boxscore report	Pts: Broekhoff 26; Rebs: Wetzell 11; Asts: Adnam, Gliddon, Wetzell 5	Attendance: 2,602; Referees: Scott Beker, James Boyer, Daniel Battye

1 April 2021	Perth Wildcats	95–89	Sydney Kings	RAC Arena, Perth
18:30	Scoring by quarter: 19–22, 25–21, 22–25, 29–21
ESPN	Pts: Cotton 22; Rebs: Mooney 11; Asts: Norton 7	boxscore report	Pts: Martin 27; Rebs: Martin 11; Asts: Louzada 4	Attendance: 10,123; Referees: Michael Aylen, James Griguol, Mark Grist

2 April 2021	Melbourne United	95–85	Cairns Taipans	John Cain Arena, Melbourne
17:30	Scoring by quarter: 26–21, 23–24, 24–19, 22–21
SBS Viceland	Pts: Landale 20; Rebs: Landale 11; Asts: McCarron 5	boxscore report	Pts: Oliver 19; Rebs: Oliver 12; Asts: Machado 6	Attendance: 3,673; Referees: Chris Reid, Damian Lyons, Elliot Green

3 April 2021	Sydney Kings	90–71	Brisbane Bullets	Qudos Bank Arena, Sydney
17:30	Scoring by quarter: 22–12, 18–19, 21–11, 29–18
SBS Viceland	Pts: Moller 20; Rebs: Martin 10; Asts: Ware 9	boxscore report	Pts: Sobey 31; Rebs: Harrison 19; Asts: Froling 5	Attendance: 5,439; Referees: Scott Beker, James Boyer, Mitch Hare

3 April 2021	Adelaide 36ers	84–72	Illawarra Hawks	Adelaide Entertainment Centre, Adelaide
19:30	Scoring by quarter: 21–17, 25–15, 13–24, 25–16
ESPN	Pts: Johnson 26; Rebs: Johnson 15; Asts: Giddey 8	boxscore report	Pts: Jessup 17; Rebs: Froling 12; Asts: Froling, Naar, Simon 3	Attendance: 5,686; Referees: Michael Aylen, Nathan Durant, Daniel Troy

4 April 2021	South East Melbourne Phoenix	92–85	New Zealand Breakers	John Cain Arena, Melbourne
15:00	Scoring by quarter: 29–17, 17–23, 21–29, 25–16
SBS Viceland	Pts: Creek 24; Rebs: Wetzell 10; Asts: Adnam 7	boxscore report	Pts: Iverson 26; Rebs: Iverson 22; Asts: T. Webster 7	Attendance: 1,850; Referees: Chris Reid, Damian Lyons, Daniel Battye

4 April 2021	Cairns Taipans	73–83	Melbourne United	Cairns Pop-Up Arena, Cairns
17:00	Scoring by quarter: 22–24, 18–19, 20–19, 13–21
SBS Viceland	Pts: Machado 20; Rebs: Oliver 10; Asts: Machado 7	boxscore report	Pts: Goulding 15; Rebs: Lual-Acuil 10; Asts: Landale, McCarron 6	Attendance: 1,847; Referees: Vaughan Mayberry, Alex McEwan, Marc Mill

=== Round 13 ===
7 April 2021	Illawarra Hawks	82–88	Brisbane Bullets	WIN Entertainment Centre, Wollongong
19:30	Scoring by quarter: 20–9, 22–24, 18–26, 22–29
ESPN	Pts: Jessup 19; Rebs: Deng 8 Asts: Froling, Harvey 4	boxscore report	Pts: Cadee 22; Rebs: Hodgson 14; Asts: Sobey 6	Attendance: 2,426; Referees: James Boyer, Mitch Hare, Elliot Green

8 April 2021	Sydney Kings	69–73	Perth Wildcats	Qudos Bank Arena, Sydney
19:30	Scoring by quarter: 26–23, 15–24, 12–9, 16–17
ESPN	Pts: Ware 20; Rebs: Hunter 13; Asts: Bruce, Ware 3	boxscore report	Pts: Cotton 23; Rebs: Mooney, Wagstaff 10; Asts: Cotton 6	Attendance: 4,115; Referees: Michael Aylen, Mitch Hare, James Griguol

9 April 2021	Illawarra Hawks	82–80	South East Melbourne Phoenix	WIN Entertainment Centre, Wollongong
19:30	Scoring by quarter: 10–18, 20–23, 25–20, 27–19
ESPN	Pts: Jessup 26; Rebs: Deng 7 Asts: Harvey 4	boxscore report	Pts: Adnam 22; Rebs: Gliddon 8 Asts: Gibson, Wetzell 4	Attendance: 2,533; Referees: James Boyer, Chris Reid, Alex McEwan

10 April 2021	Adelaide 36ers	83–68	Perth Wildcats	Adelaide Entertainment Centre, Adelaide
17:00	Scoring by quarter: 25–21, 18–14, 13–11, 27–22
SBS Viceland	Pts: Johnson 28; Rebs: Dech 10; Asts: Giddey 12	boxscore report	Pts: Mooney 18; Rebs: Mooney 14; Asts: Mooney 4	Attendance: 6,399; Referees: Michael Aylen, Nathan Durant, Daniel Troy

10 April 2021	Melbourne United	84–78	New Zealand Breakers	John Cain Arena, Melbourne
20:00	Scoring by quarter: 17–16, 22–21, 22–13, 23–28
ESPN	Pts: Hopson 19; Rebs: Landale 11; Asts: McCarron 5	boxscore report	Pts: Delany 33; Rebs: Iverson 9 Asts: McDowell-White 4	Attendance: 2,717; Referees: Vaughan Mayberry, Chris Reid, James Griguol

11 April 2021	Sydney Kings	84–98	South East Melbourne Phoenix	Qudos Bank Arena, Sydney
15:00	Scoring by quarter: 25–21, 21–30, 19–21, 19–26
SBS Viceland	Pts: Martin 23; Rebs: Hunter 9 Asts: Louzada 7	boxscore report	Pts: Creek 26; Rebs: Moore 6 Asts: Adnam 6	Attendance: 4,236; Referees: James Boyer, Damian Lyons, Daniel Battye

11 April 2021	Illawarra Hawks	82–80	Cairns Taipans	WIN Entertainment Centre, Wollongong
17:00	Scoring by quarter: 25–20, 21–15, 10–16, 26–29
SBS Viceland	Pts: Harvey 35; Rebs: Ogilvy 9 Asts: Ogilvy 5	boxscore report	Pts: Oliver 27; Rebs: Oliver 12; Asts: Oliver 5	Attendance: 3,064; Referees: Vaughan Mayberry, Mitch Hare, Mark Grist

12 April 2021	Melbourne United	98–89	Brisbane Bullets	John Cain Arena, Melbourne
19:30	Scoring by quarter: 31–20, 27–20, 12–23, 28–26
ESPN	Pts: Landale 23; Rebs: Landale 13; Asts: McCarron 11	boxscore report	Pts: Sobey 30; Rebs: Hodgson 8 Asts: Cadee 7	Attendance: 3,422; Referees: Michael Aylen, Scott Beker, Damian Lyons

13 April 2021	New Zealand Breakers	79–85(OT)	Perth Wildcats	Silverdome, Launceston
19:30	Scoring by quarter: 23–9, 10–23, 16–20, 23–20, Overtime: 7–13
ESPN	Pts: Delany 25; Rebs: Delany 9 Asts: C. Webster 8	boxscore report	Pts: Cotton 34; Rebs: Bairstow, Mooney, Norton 9 Asts: Cotton, Mooney 3	Attendance: 1,358; Referees: Vaughan Mayberry, Chris Reid, Ruben Woolcock

=== Round 14 ===
14 April 2021	Cairns Taipans	91–88	Adelaide 36ers	Cairns Pop-Up Arena, Cairns
19:30	Scoring by quarter: 17–26, 28–22, 21–20, 25–20
ESPN	Pts: Oliver 25; Rebs: Oliver 17; Asts: Dufelmeier 8	boxscore report	Pts: Johnson 24; Rebs: Giddey 7 Asts: Giddey 9	Attendance: 1,869; Referees: Michael Aylen, Marc Mill, Alex McEwan

15 April 2021	Sydney Kings	97–90	South East Melbourne Phoenix	Qudos Bank Arena, Sydney
19:30	Scoring by quarter: 28–23, 22–22, 28–12, 19–33
ESPN	Pts: Louzada 28; Rebs: Louzada 8 Asts: Ware 6	boxscore report	Pts: Mauriohooho-Le'afa 29; Rebs: Moore 7 Asts: Sykes 5	Attendance: 4,476; Referees: Michael Aylen, James Boyer, Ruben Woolcock

16 April 2021	New Zealand Breakers	91–71	Brisbane Bullets	Silverdome, Launceston
19:30	Scoring by quarter: 23–17, 21–12, 20–23, 27–21
ESPN	Pts: Randolph 20; Rebs: McDowell-White 10; Asts: McDowell-White 14	boxscore report	Pts: Hodgson 16; Rebs: Harrison, Hodgson, Sobey 6 Asts: Sobey 2	Attendance: 1,559; Referees: Vaughan Mayberry, Mitch Hare, Daniel Battye

16 April 2021	Perth Wildcats	83–69	Illawarra Hawks	RAC Arena, Perth
19:30	Scoring by quarter: 26–23, 16–20, 18–9, 23–17
ESPN	Pts: Blanchfield, Cotton 18; Rebs: Mooney 15; Asts: Norton 5	boxscore report	Pts: Froling 15; Rebs: Froling 8 Asts: Naar 4	Attendance: 11,485; Referees: Chris Reid, Damien Lyons, Daniel Troy

17 April 2021	South East Melbourne Phoenix	81–90	Adelaide 36ers	John Cain Arena, Melbourne
17:30	Scoring by quarter: 16–15, 19–25, 19–28, 27–22
SBS Viceland	Pts: Creek 17; Rebs: Creek 14; Asts: Adnam, Gibson, Moore 3	boxscore report	Pts: Johnson 22; Rebs: Johnson 8 Asts: Giddey 9	Attendance: 2,512; Referees: Vaughan Mayberry, Mitch Hare, Craig Copes

17 April 2021	Sydney Kings	89–84	Cairns Taipans	Qudos Bank Arena, Sydney
20:00	Scoring by quarter: 27–12, 22–26, 16–27, 24–19
ESPN	Pts: Ware 40; Rebs: Hunter 8 Asts: Bruce 4	boxscore report	Pts: Oliver 27; Rebs: Oliver 19; Asts: Dufelmeier, Machado 5	Attendance: 5,214; Referees: Scott Beker, Nathan Durant, Daniel Battye

18 April 2021	Melbourne United	87–76	Illawarra Hawks	John Cain Arena, Melbourne
15:00	Scoring by quarter: 30–21, 26–21, 20–19, 11–15
SBS Viceland	Pts: Lual-Acuil 15; Rebs: Landale 11; Asts: Landale 5	boxscore report	Pts: Jessup 19; Rebs: Froling 7 Asts: Naar 4	Attendance: 3,794; Referees: Scott Beker, James Boyer, Ruben Woolcock

18 April 2021	Perth Wildcats	78–83	New Zealand Breakers	RAC Arena, Perth
15:00	Scoring by quarter: 22–20, 20–19, 18–26, 18–18
SBS Viceland	Pts: Mooney 22; Rebs: Mooney 8 Asts: Cotton 9	boxscore report	Pts: Randolph 23; Rebs: Iverson 17; Asts: Delany 5	Attendance: 11,316; Referees: Chris Reid, Damian Lyons, James Griguol

=== Round 15 ===
22 April 2021	South East Melbourne Phoenix	81–101	Sydney Kings	John Cain Arena, Melbourne
19:30	Scoring by quarter: 16–21, 19–17, 14–35, 32–28
ESPN	Pts: Creek 29; Rebs: Wetzell 6 Asts: Adnam 5	boxscore report	Pts: Hunter, Ware 19; Rebs: Hunter 10; Asts: Ware 5	Attendance: 1,268; Referees: Vaughan Mayberry, Chris Reid, Elliot Green

23 April 2021	New Zealand Breakers	68–70	Cairns Taipans	Silverdome, Launceston
19:30	Scoring by quarter: 10–12, 15–27, 19–17, 24–14
ESPN	Pts: Delany 23; Rebs: Delany 14; Asts: C. Webster 7	boxscore report	Pts: Jawai 21; Rebs: Jawai 8 Asts: Machado 8	Attendance: 1,287; Referees: Scott Beker, Damian Lyons, Ruben Woolcock

23 April 2021	Perth Wildcats	92–74	Brisbane Bullets	RAC Arena, Perth
19:30	Scoring by quarter: 20–9, 25–27, 14–16, 33–22
ESPN	Pts: Cotton 21; Rebs: Mooney 13; Asts: Mooney 7	boxscore report	Pts: Froling 20; Rebs: Patterson 10; Asts: Sobey 5	Attendance: 4,737; Referees: Michael Aylen, Mitch Hare, James Griguol

24 April 2021	Melbourne United	92–78	Adelaide 36ers	John Cain Arena, Melbourne
17:30	Scoring by quarter: 28–22, 20–25, 19–16, 25–15
SBS Viceland	Pts: McCarron 21; Rebs: Landale, Lual-Acuil 10; Asts: McCarron 5	boxscore report	Pts: Paul 20; Rebs: Giddey 10; Asts: Giddey 7	Attendance: 3,034; Referees: Chris Reid, James Boyer, Ruben Woolcock

24 April 2021	Illawarra Hawks	75–79(OT)	Sydney Kings	WIN Entertainment Centre, Wollongong
20:00	Scoring by quarter: 16–15, 18–25, 20–18, 15–11, Overtime: 6–10
ESPN	Pts: Froling 22; Rebs: Froling 12; Asts: Naar 12	boxscore	Pts: Ware 18; Rebs: Bruce 13; Asts: Ware 4	Attendance: 3,724; Referees: Vaughan Mayberry, Damian Lyons, Alex McEwan

25 April 2021	Cairns Taipans	66–86	South East Melbourne Phoenix	Cairns Pop-Up Arena, Cairns
17:00	Scoring by quarter: 16–29, 23–18, 14–28, 13–15
SBS Viceland	Pts: Jois 12; Rebs: Jawai, Jois 8 Asts: Machado 4	boxscore report	Pts: Gliddon 22; Rebs: Creek 8 Asts: Mauriohooho-Le'afa 4	Attendance: 1,905; Referees: Vaughan Mayberry, Daniel Battye, Marc Mill

26 April 2021	New Zealand Breakers	93–77	Adelaide 36ers	Silverdome, Launceston
19:30	Scoring by quarter: 25–19, 22–24, 24–16, 22–18
ESPN	Pts: Delany 23; Rebs: Iverson 9 Asts: McDowell-White 13	boxscore report	Pts: Johnson 20; Rebs: Giddey 10; Asts: Giddey 10	Attendance: 893; Referees: Chris Reid, Damian Lyons, Nathan Durant

=== Round 16 ===
On 15 April 2021, the NBL announced that Round 16 would be the league's heritage round, with each team wearing their own heritage jersey.

28 April 2021	Melbourne United	90–76	New Zealand Breakers	John Cain Arena, Melbourne
19:30	Scoring by quarter: 31–22, 15–14, 22–16, 22–24
ESPN	Pts: Hopson 25; Rebs: Lual-Acuil 9 Asts: Barlow, McCarron 3	boxscore report	Pts: C. Webster 20; Rebs: Delany 9 Asts: C. Webster 5	Attendance: 2,173; Referees: Vaughan Mayberry, James Boyer, Elliot Green

29 April 2021	South East Melbourne Phoenix	82–94	Brisbane Bullets	John Cain Arena, Melbourne
19:30	Scoring by quarter: 15–22, 19–14, 25–33, 23–25
ESPN	Pts: Moore 18; Rebs: Moore 7 Asts: Mauriohooho-Le'afa 4	boxscore report	Pts: Patterson 27; Rebs: Hodgson 9 Asts: Sobey 8	Attendance: 1,026; Referees: Vaughan Mayberry, Scott Beker, Ruben Woolcock, Hugh Starkey

1 May 2021	New Zealand Breakers	86–84	Perth Wildcats	Silverdome, Launceston
17:30	Scoring by quarter: 28–23, 18–24, 18–20, 22–17
SBS Viceland	Pts: Randolph 19; Rebs: Iverson 5 Asts: Randolph, C. Webster, T. Webster 4	boxscore report	Pts: Mooney 25; Rebs: Mooney 9 Asts: Blanchfield, Mooney, Norton 4	Attendance: 1,621; Referees: Chris Reid, Damian Lyons, Daniel Battye

1 May 2021	Adelaide 36ers	101–79	Brisbane Bullets	Adelaide Entertainment Centre, Adelaide
19:30	Scoring by quarter: 22–23, 33–24, 20–12, 26–20
ESPN	Pts: Johnson 26; Rebs: Giddey 11; Asts: Giddey 13	boxscore report	Pts: Sobey 20; Rebs: Hodgson 9 Asts: Sobey 8	Attendance: 6,683; Referees: Michael Aylen, Nathan Durant, Daniel Troy

2 May 2021	Melbourne United	103–78	Sydney Kings	John Cain Arena, Melbourne
15:00	Scoring by quarter: 20–31, 32–15, 18–19, 33–13
SBS Viceland	Pts: Goulding 21; Rebs: Lual-Acuil 9 Asts: McCarron 8	boxscore report	Pts: Ware 25; Rebs: Moller 11; Asts: Bruce 5	Attendance: 2,214; Referees: Vaughan Mayberry, James Boyer, Mitch Hare

3 May 2021	New Zealand Breakers	67–75	Illawarra Hawks	Silverdome, Launceston
19:30	Scoring by quarter: 23–18, 17–22, 17–18, 10–17
ESPN	Pts: Abercrombie, T. Webster 14; Rebs: Delany 9 Asts: T. Webster 5	boxscore report	Pts: Harvey 29; Rebs: Simon 6 Asts: Froling 4	Attendance: 1,097; Referees: Chris Reid, Damian Lyons, Daniel Battye

4 May 2021	Adelaide 36ers	92–76	Cairns Taipans	Adelaide Entertainment Centre, Adelaide
19:00	Scoring by quarter: 27–9, 19–21, 23–17, 23–29
ESPN	Pts: Paul 18; Rebs: Johnson, Paul 10; Asts: Giddey 6	boxscore report	Pts: Deng 16; Rebs: Jois 9 Asts: Machado 7	Attendance: 7,001; Referees: Michael Aylen, Nathan Durant, Hugh Starkey

5 May 2021	Melbourne United	69–82	Perth Wildcats	John Cain Arena, Melbourne
19:30	Scoring by quarter: 19–12, 17–34, 20–20, 13–16
ESPN	Pts: Landale 11; Rebs: Lual-Acuil 8 Asts: McCarron 5	boxscore report	Pts: Mooney 30; Rebs: Mooney 14; Asts: Cotton 10	Attendance: 2,011; Referees: Michael Aylen, Chris Reid, James Griguol

=== Round 17 ===
8 May 2021	South East Melbourne Phoenix	82–93	Melbourne United	John Cain Arena, Melbourne
17:30	Scoring by quarter: 31–16, 16–28, 12–27, 23–14
SBS Viceland	Pts: Mauriohooho-Le'afa 19; Rebs: Wetzell 9 Asts: Sykes 5	boxscore report	Pts: Landale 27; Rebs: Landale 11; Asts: Baba 3	Attendance: 3,899; Referees: Vaughan Mayberry, Damian Lyons, James Griguol

8 May 2021	Cairns Taipans	87–96	Brisbane Bullets	Cairns Pop-Up Arena, Cairns
20:00	Scoring by quarter: 25–30, 20–27, 21–21, 21–18
ESPN	Pts: Jawai 20; Rebs: Deng 9 Asts: Machado 7	boxscore report	Pts: Sobey 25; Rebs: Harrison, Sobey 9 Asts: Sobey 5	Attendance: 1,903; Referees: Chris Reid, Nathan Durant, Alex McEwan

9 May 2021	Sydney Kings	88–97(OT)	Adelaide 36ers	Qudos Bank Arena, Sydney
15:00	Scoring by quarter: 19–16, 28–18, 11–24, 23–23, Overtime: 7–16
SBS Viceland	Pts: Martin 25; Rebs: Hunter 9 Asts: Ware 8	boxscore report	Pts: Johnson 20; Rebs: Giddey 10; Asts: Giddey 12	Attendance: 4,063; Referees: Chris Reid, Damian Lyons, Craig Copes

9 May 2021	Perth Wildcats	98–84	New Zealand Breakers	RAC Arena, Perth
15:00	Scoring by quarter: 26–22, 25–27, 20–13, 27–22
SBS Viceland	Pts: Cotton 32; Rebs: Mooney, Wagstaff 8 Asts: Cotton 10	boxscore report	Pts: Delany 21; Rebs: T. Webster 7 Asts: McDowell-White 9	Attendance: 10,518; Referees: Michael Aylen, Mitch Hare, Daniel Troy

=== Round 18 ===
11 May 2021	Illawarra Hawks	71–66	Adelaide 36ers	WIN Entertainment Centre, Wollongong
19:30	Scoring by quarter: 23–10, 11–28, 20–14, 17–14
ESPN	Pts: Harvey 23; Rebs: Deng 9 Asts: Harvey 7	boxscore report	Pts: Crocker 16; Rebs: Giddey, Pinder 9 Asts: Giddey 8	Attendance: 2,036; Referees: Vaughan Mayberry, Nathan Durant, Ruben Woolcock

12 May 2021	South East Melbourne Phoenix	91–82	New Zealand Breakers	John Cain Arena, Melbourne
19:30	Scoring by quarter: 19–19, 28–23, 17–14, 27–26
ESPN	Pts: Sykes 21; Rebs: Moore 6 Asts: Adnam 5	boxscore report	Pts: Delany 32; Rebs: Iverson 8 Asts: McDowell-White 5	Attendance: 1,247; Referees: Michael Aylen, Damien Lyons, Elliot Green

13 May 2021	Brisbane Bullets	93–70	Sydney Kings	Nissan Arena, Brisbane
19:30	Scoring by quarter: 20–17, 32–10, 18–24, 23–19
ESPN	Pts: Drmic 28; Rebs: Harrison 7 Asts: Cadee 8	boxscore report	Pts: Hunter 15; Rebs: Hunter, Moller 11; Asts: Ware 3	Attendance: 1,374; Referees: Chris Reid, Nathan Durant, Mitch Hare

13 May 2021	Perth Wildcats	91–99	Melbourne United	RAC Arena, Perth
19:30	Scoring by quarter: 21–28, 25–23, 22–25, 23–23
ESPN	Pts: Cotton, Mooney 24; Rebs: Mooney 14; Asts: Mooney 5	boxscore report	Pts: Goulding 26; Rebs: Landale 7 Asts: McCarron 6	Attendance: 9,987; Referees: Vaughan Mayberry, James Boyer, James Griguol

14 May 2021	South East Melbourne Phoenix	106–77	Cairns Taipans	John Cain Arena, Melbourne
19:30	Scoring by quarter: 21–20, 36–25, 29–14, 20–18
ESPN	Pts: Creek 20; Rebs: Wetzell 11; Asts: Sykes 4	boxscore report	Pts: Djeric 17; Rebs: Blagojevic, Jois 4 Asts: Dufelmeier 4	Attendance: 1,711; Referees: Chris Reid, Daniel Battye, Marty Davison

15 May 2021	Brisbane Bullets	90–102	Perth Wildcats	Nissan Arena, Brisbane
17:30	Scoring by quarter: 18–28, 26–17, 22–16, 24–41
SBS Viceland	Pts: Sobey 24; Rebs: Hodgson, Patterson 9 Asts: Patterson 7	boxscore report	Pts: Blanchfield 31; Rebs: Norton 8 Asts: Mooney 5	Attendance: 3,405; Referees: Michael Aylen, Damian Lyons, Alex McEwan

15 May 2021	Illawarra Hawks	73–71	New Zealand Breakers	WIN Entertainment Centre, Wollongong
20:00	Scoring by quarter: 24–27, 18–8, 16–15, 15–21
ESPN	Pts: Harvey 24; Rebs: Froling 12; Asts: Coenraad, Grida, Harvey, Jessup, Simon 1	boxscore	Pts: Delany 20; Rebs: Delany 11; Asts: McDowell-White 9	Attendance: 2,456; Referees: James Boyer, Mitch Hare, Craig Copes

16 May 2021	Melbourne United	83–94	South East Melbourne Phoenix	John Cain Arena, Melbourne
15:00	Scoring by quarter: 20–20, 23–23, 20–28, 20–23
SBS Viceland	Pts: Landale 19; Rebs: McCarron 7 Asts: McCarron 6	boxscore report	Pts: Sykes 26; Rebs: Creek 8 Asts: Creek 8	Attendance: 3,460; Referees: Vaughan Mayberry, Chris Reid, Elliot Green

16 May 2021	Sydney Kings	85–75	Adelaide 36ers	Qudos Bank Arena, Sydney
17:00	Scoring by quarter: 18–12, 19–30, 23–10, 25–23
SBS Viceland	Pts: Martin 20; Rebs: Moller 11; Asts: Ware 12	boxscore report	Pts: Johnson 23; Rebs: Giddey, Johnson, Pinder 7 Asts: Giddey 5	Attendance: 5,078; Referees: Michael Aylen, James Griguol, Craig Copes

17 May 2021	Cairns Taipans	78–89	Perth Wildcats	Cairns Pop-Up Arena, Cairns
19:30	Scoring by quarter: 26–28, 18–17, 21–20, 13–24
ESPN	Pts: Jawai 20; Rebs: Jawai 9 Asts: Machado 8	boxscore report	Pts: Cotton 24; Rebs: Mooney 10; Asts: Cotton	Attendance: 1,811; Referees: Damian Lyons, Daniel Battye, Mark Mill

=== Round 19 ===
18 May 2021	Illawarra Hawks	87–102	Melbourne United	WIN Entertainment Centre, Wollongong
19:30	Scoring by quarter: 27–28, 15–25, 17–28, 28–21
ESPN	Pts: Deng 15; Rebs: Deng 8 Asts: Naar, Harvey 4	boxscore report	Pts: Goulding 25; Rebs: Landale 10; Asts: Hopson 8	Attendance: 1,794; Referees: Michael Aylen, James Boyer, Alex McEwan

19 May 2021	Brisbane Bullets	91–88	Perth Wildcats	Nissan Arena, Brisbane
19:30	Scoring by quarter: 19–33, 20–20, 26–20, 26–15
ESPN	Pts: Patterson 23; Rebs: Hodgson 12; Asts: Cadee 5	boxscore report	Pts: Steindl 25; Rebs: Bairstow, Mooney 7 Asts: Cotton 5	Attendance: 1,332; Referees: Chris Reid, Damian Lyons, Mark Mill

20 May 2021	New Zealand Breakers	89–81	Sydney Kings	The Trusts Arena, Auckland
19:30	Scoring by quarter: 26–26, 25–13, 23–15, 15–27
ESPN	Pts: Delany 28; Rebs: Delany 12; Asts: McDowell-White 7	boxscore report	Pts: Ware 20; Rebs: Bruce, Hunter, Martin, Moller 5 Asts: Bruce, Ware 3	Attendance: 3,800; Referees: Vaughan Mayberry, Daniel Battye, Marty Davison

21 May 2021	Adelaide 36ers	73–81	Illawarra Hawks	Adelaide Entertainment Centre, Adelaide
19:00	Scoring by quarter: 14–24, 14–26, 18–17, 27–14
ESPN	Pts: Dillon 17; Rebs: Dillon 8 Asts: Dillon 5	boxscore report	Pts: Froling 19; Rebs: Deng, Froling 7 Asts: Naar 7	Attendance: 6,090; Referees: Michael Aylen, Nathan Durant, Ruben Woolcock

21 May 2021	Perth Wildcats	100–79	Cairns Taipans	RAC Arena, Perth
19:30	Scoring by quarter: 26–28, 21–14, 30–14, 23–23
ESPN	Pts: Blanchfield, Cotton 19; Rebs: Magnay 9 Asts: Norton 5	boxscore report	Pts: Djeric 15; Rebs: Jois 5 Asts: Dufelmeier 6	Attendance: 10,671; Referees: James Boyer, Mitch Hare, Craig Copes

22 May 2021	New Zealand Breakers	76–81	Sydney Kings	TSB Stadium, New Plymouth
19:30	Scoring by quarter: 24–23, 20–15, 17–18, 15–25
SBS Viceland	Pts: Randolph 25; Rebs: Iverson, T. Webster 7 Asts: T. Webster 5	boxscore report	Pts: Martin 29; Rebs: Martin 9 Asts: Bruce 5	Attendance: 2,066; Referees: Vaughan Mayberry, Daniel Battye, Marty Davison

22 May 2021	Brisbane Bullets	66–95	South East Melbourne Phoenix	Nissan Arena, Brisbane
20:00	Scoring by quarter: 24–31, 18–19, 10–25, 14–19
ESPN	Pts: Drmic 20; Rebs: Harrison 8 Asts: Cadee, Sobey 4	boxscore report	Pts: Wetzell 18; Rebs: Wetzell 9 Asts: Sykes 8	Attendance: 2,533; Referees: Chris Reid, Nathan Durant, Elliot Green

23 May 2021	Adelaide 36ers	68–76	Perth Wildcats	Adelaide Entertainment Centre, Adelaide
14:30	Scoring by quarter: 18–22, 16–14, 17–20, 17–120
SBS Viceland	Pts: Johnson 13; Rebs: Paul 11; Asts: Crocker, Dillon 5	boxscore report	Pts: Norton 19; Rebs: Mooney 12; Asts: Mooney 5	Attendance: 6,422; Referees: Michael Aylen, James Griguol, Ruben Woolcock

23 May 2021	Illawarra Hawks	93–81	Cairns Taipans	WIN Entertainment Centre, Wollongong
17:00	Scoring by quarter: 21–23, 27–30, 23–6, 24–22
SBS Viceland	Pts: Jessup 24; Rebs: Oglivy 11; Asts: Harvey 9	boxscore report	Pts: Machado 17; Rebs: Jois, Krslovic, Machado 4 Asts: Machado 9	Attendance: 2,258; Referees: James Boyer, Mitch Hare, Mark Grist

24 May 2021	Brisbane Bullets	88–99	Melbourne United	Nissan Arena, Brisbane
19:30	Scoring by quarter: 27–24, 11–26, 21–24, 29–25
ESPN	Pts: Sobey 20; Rebs: Hodgson 9 Asts: Cadee 5	boxscore report	Pts: Goulding 22; Rebs: McCarron, Peatling 6 Asts: McCarron 7	Attendance: 1,614; Referees: Chris Reid, Alex McEwan, James Griguol

25 May 2021	New Zealand Breakers	94–76	Adelaide 36ers	Christchurch Arena, Christchurch
19:30	Scoring by quarter: 18–15, 29–18, 25–28, 22–15
ESPN	Pts: C. Webster 22; Rebs: Iverson 7 Asts: McDowell-White, C. Webster 8	boxscore report	Pts: Dillon 22; Rebs: Paul, Pinder 7 Asts: Dillon 6	Attendance: 2,803; Referees: Vaughan Mayberry, Daniel Battye, Marty Davison

=== Round 20 ===
On 18 May 2021, Round 20 was announced as the league's annual Indigenous Round with each team wearing jersey's featuring indigenous artwork inspired by their local area.

26 May 2021	Cairns Taipans	96–101	Brisbane Bullets	Cairns Pop-Up Arena, Cairns
19:30	Scoring by quarter: 25–24, 22–28, 28–29, 21–20
ESPN	Pts: King 25; Rebs: Jawai 7 Asts: Machado 11	boxscore report	Pts: Sobey 21; Rebs: Froling 8 Asts: Sobey 8	Attendance: 1,908; Referees: Damian Lyons, James Griguol, Jacqui Dover

27 May 2021	Perth Wildcats	81–67	Sydney Kings	RAC Arena, Perth
19:30	Scoring by quarter: 21–22, 32–16, 19–20, 9–9
ESPN	Pts: Blanchfield 23; Rebs: Mooney 10; Asts: Norton 6	boxscore	Pts: Martin 20; Rebs: Hunter 10; Asts: Bruce, Cooks 3	Attendance: 10,650; Referees: Vaughan Mayberry, Craig Copes, Mark Grist

28 May 2021	New Zealand Breakers	73–84	Illawarra Hawks	Franklin Pool and Leisure Centre, Pukekohe
19:30	Scoring by quarter: 16–11, 23–26, 14–23, 20–24
ESPN	Pts: Delany 24; Rebs: Iverson, Randolph 8 Asts: McDowell-White 5	boxscore report	Pts: Harvey 30; Rebs: Froling, Harvey, Simon 8 Asts: Harvey 4	Attendance: 1,100; Referees: Nathan Durant, Marty Davidson, Ryan Jones

28 May 2021	South East Melbourne Phoenix	87–94	Cairns Taipans	Cairns Pop-Up Arena, Cairns
19:30	Scoring by quarter: 22–24, 2520, 26–19, 14–31
ESPN	Pts: Wetzell 25; Rebs: Wetzell 7 Asts: Sykes 7	boxscore report	Pts: Deng 22; Rebs: Jawai 10; Asts: Dufelmeier, Jawai 5	Attendance: 1,251; Referees: Damian Lyons, Ruben Woolcock, Mark Mill

29 May 2021	Sydney Kings	100–98(2OT)	Melbourne United	Qudos Bank Arena, Sydney
20:00	Scoring by quarter: 18–22, 23–24, 26–17, 17–21, Overtime: 6–6, 10–8
ESPN	Pts: Bruce 21; Rebs: Moller 12; Asts: Bruce 7	boxscore report	Pts: Landale 23; Rebs: Landale 12; Asts: McCarron 9	Attendance: 6,238; Referees: Vaughan Mayberry, James Boyer, Mitch Hare

30 May 2021	Illawarra Hawks	97–83	Adelaide 36ers	WIN Entertainment Centre, Wollongong
17:00	Scoring by quarter: 31–25, 21–13, 28–23, 17–22
SBS Viceland	Pts: Harvey 23; Rebs: Harvey, Ogilvy 6 Asts: Harvey, Naar 5	boxscore report	Pts: Dech 15; Rebs: Pinder 11; Asts: Dillon 6	Attendance: 3,004; Referees: Vaughan Mayberry, James Boyer, Mitch Hare

30 May 2021	New Zealand Breakers	83–95	Brisbane Bullets	Spark Arena, Auckland
17:00	Scoring by quarter: 23–29, 12–25, 22–21, 26–20
SBS Viceland	Pts: Randolph 30; Rebs: Iverson 16; Asts: C. Webster 6	boxscore report	Pts: Patterson 21; Rebs: Hodgson 9 Asts: Cadee 8	Attendance: 7,612; Referees: Chris Reid, Nathan Durant, Marty Davison

31 May 2021	Melbourne United	101–76	Cairns Taipans	Qudos Bank Arena, Sydney
19:30	Scoring by quarter: 29–13, 26–29, 22–13, 24–21
ESPN	Pts: Landale 19; Rebs: Peatling 11; Asts: Hopson 5	boxscore report	Pts: Djeric 16; Rebs: Jawai 6 Asts: Djeric, Machado 3	Attendance: closed event Referees: Chris Reid, Mitch Hare, Jacqui Dover

=== Round 21 ===
1 June 2021	Illawarra Hawks	81–79	Perth Wildcats	WIN Entertainment Centre, Wollongong
19:30	Scoring by quarter: 20–16, 22–20, 19–20, 20–23
ESPN	Pts: Harvey 27; Rebs: Ogilvy 7 Asts: Harvey, Ogilvy 3	boxscore report	Pts: Steindl 15; Rebs: Mooney 15; Asts: Norton 9	Attendance: 2,038; Referees: James Boyer, Mitch Hare, Alex McEwan

2 June 2021	New Zealand Breakers	84–78	Cairns Taipans	Energy Events Centre, Rotorua
19:30	Scoring by quarter: 25–16, 16–26, 14–17, 29–19
ESPN	Pts: T. Webster 23; Rebs: Iverson 12; Asts: C. Webster 4	boxscore report	Pts: Machado 21; Rebs: Jawai 8 Asts: Machado 10	Attendance: 2,435; Referees: Nathan Durant, Marty Davison, Ryan Jones

2 June 2021	South East Melbourne Phoenix	84–91	Brisbane Bullets	Cairns Pop-Up Arena, Cairns
19:30	Scoring by quarter: 25–16, 17–21, 15–31, 27–23
ESPN	Pts: Creek 28; Rebs: Creek 10; Asts: Sykes 8	boxscore report	Pts: Sobey 22; Rebs: Sobey 9 Asts: Cadee, Sobey 6	Attendance: closed event Referees: Vaughan Mayberry, Damian Lyons, Ruben Woolcock

3 June 2021	Illawarra Hawks	73–79	Sydney Kings	WIN Entertainment Centre, Wollongong
19:30	Scoring by quarter: 15–21, 23–24, 22–14, 13–20
ESPN	Pts: Froling, Naar, White 12; Rebs: Froling 7 Asts: Naar 6	boxscore report	Pts: Martin 23; Rebs: Cooks, Martin 10; Asts: Ware 8	Attendance: 3,217; Referees: Chris Reid, James Boyer, Nathan Durant

4 June 2021	Perth Wildcats	64–78	Melbourne United	RAC Arena, Perth
19:30	Scoring by quarter: 12–24, 17–12, 17–18, 18–24
ESPN	Pts: Blanchfield 15; Rebs: Travers 8 Asts: White 6	boxscore report	Pts: Lual-Acuil 16; Rebs: McCarron 6 Asts: McCarron 5	Attendance: Vaughan Mayberry, Mitch Hare, James Griguol; Referees: 12,185

5 June 2021	New Zealand Breakers	78–83	South East Melbourne Phoenix	The Trusts Arena, Auckland
19:30	Scoring by quarter: 26–26, 16–26, 15–15, 21–16
SBS Viceland	Pts: T. Webster 26; Rebs: Iverson 12; Asts: Delany 4	boxscore report	Pts: Sykes 29; Rebs: Broekhoff 10; Asts: Sykes 5	Attendance: 3,872; Referees: Chris Reid, Ruben Woolcock, Marty Davison

5 June 2021	Sydney Kings	83–82	Brisbane Bullets	Qudos Bank Arena, Sydney
20:00	Scoring by quarter: 17–24, 29–17, 24–17, 13–24
ESPN	Pts: Martin 28; Rebs: Cooks 7 Asts: Cooks 5	boxscore report	Pts: Sobey 22; Rebs: Sobey 8 Asts: Sobey 8	Attendance: 9,267; Referees: James Boyer, Damian Lyons, Daniel Troy

6 June 2021	Melbourne United	102–80	Adelaide 36ers	Adelaide Entertainment Centre, Adelaide
14:30	Scoring by quarter: 28–20, 25–20, 24–21, 25–19
SBS Viceland	Pts: Hopson, Landale 19; Rebs: Landale 9 Asts: Ili 8	boxscore report	Pts: Crocker 27; Rebs: Johnson 13; Asts: Dillon 6	Attendance: 1,817; Referees: Michael Aylen, James Griguol, Daniel Troy

8 June 2021	Brisbane Bullets	94–84	South East Melbourne Phoenix	Nissan Arena, Brisbane
19:30	Scoring by quarter: 25–21, 24–27, 20–17, 25–19
ESPN	Pts: Patterson 19; Rebs: Harrison, Sobey 11; Asts: Sobey 4	boxscore report	Pts: Creek 17; Rebs: Moore 16; Asts: Adnam 6	Attendance: 2,508; Referees: Vaughan Mayberry, Chris Reid, Alex McEwan

== Ladder ==
Pos	2020–21 NBL season											
Pos	Team	Pld	W	L	PCT	Last 5	Streak	Home	Away	PF	PA	PP
1	Melbourne United	36	28	8	77.78%	4–1	W3	14–4	14–4	3189	2956	107.88%
2	Perth Wildcats	36	25	11	69.44%	3–2	L2	13–5	12–6	3133	2900	108.03%
3	Illawarra Hawks	36	20	16	55.56%	4–1	L1	11–7	9–9	2962	2954	100.27%
4	S.E. Melbourne Phoenix	36	19	17	52.78%	2–3	L1	9–9	10–8	3217	3124	102.98%
5	Sydney Kings	36	19	17	52.78%	4–1	W3	11–7	8–10	3112	3087	100.81%
6	Brisbane Bullets	36	18	18	50.00%	4–1	W1	9–9	9–9	3204	3274	97.86%
7	Adelaide 36ers	36	13	23	36.11%	0–5	L7	10–8	3–15	2985	3156	94.58%
8	New Zealand Breakers	36	12	24	33.33%	2–3	L1	8–10	4–14	2937	3021	97.22%
9	Cairns Taipans	36	8	28	22.22%	1–4	L2	6–12	2–16	2940	3207	91.67%

Updated to match(es) played on 9 June 2021. Source: NBL.com.au

Preceded by 2019–20 season	NBL seasons 2020–21	Succeeded by 2021–22 season
