= Justinian Jessup =

American basketball player (born 1998)

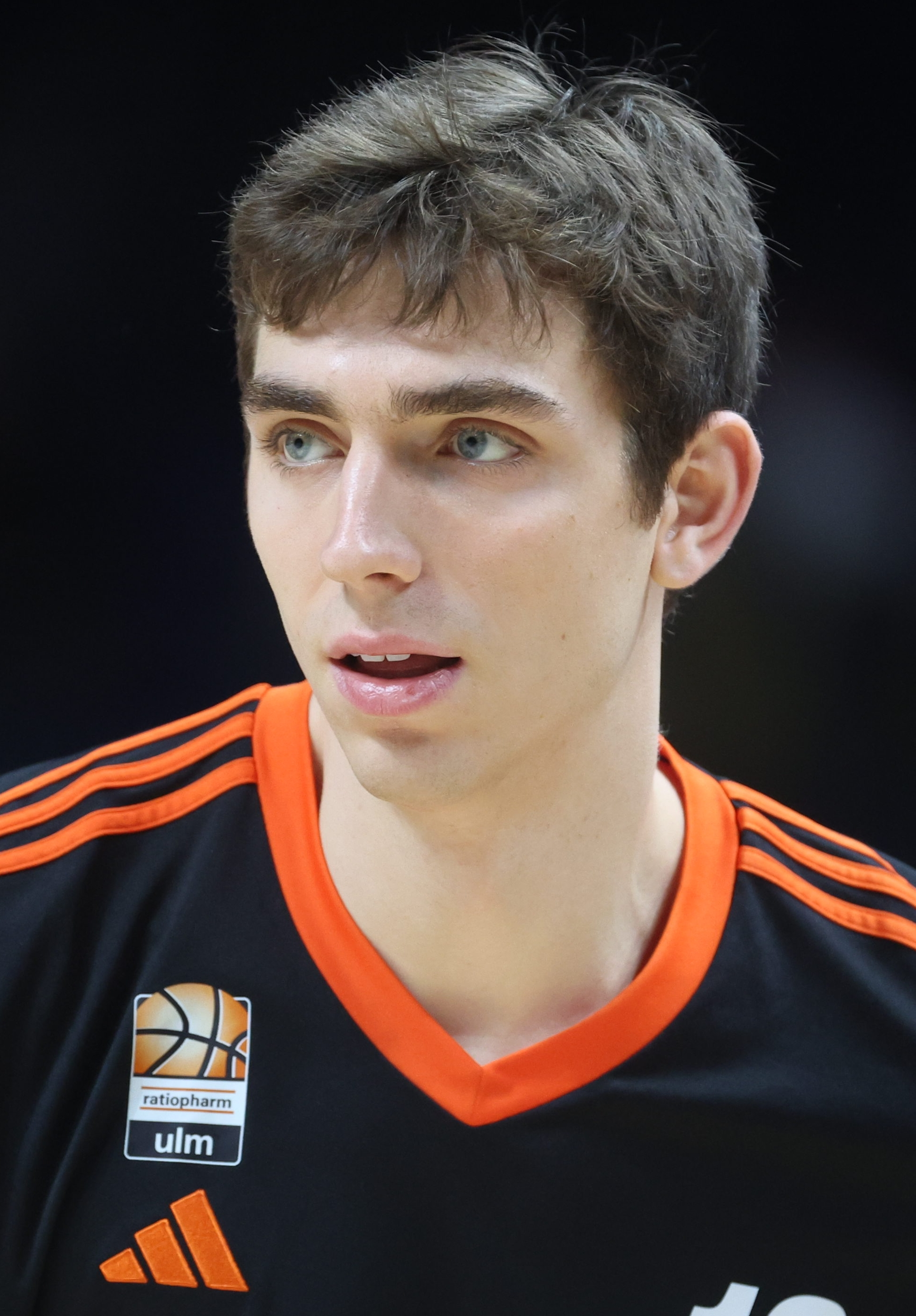
- Jessup with Ulm in 2024

No. 10 – Bayern Munich
- Position: Shooting guard
- League: BBL; EuroLeague

Personal information
- Born: May 23, 1998 (age 28) Longmont, Colorado, U.S.
- Listed height: 6 ft 7 in (2.01 m)
- Listed weight: 214 lb (97 kg)

Career information
- High school: Longmont (Longmont, Colorado)
- College: Boise State (2016–2020)
- NBA draft: 2020: 2nd round, 51st overall pick
- Drafted by: Golden State Warriors
- Playing career: 2020–present

Career history
- 2020–2022: Illawarra Hawks
- 2022–2023: Zaragoza
- 2023–2024: New Zealand Breakers
- 2024–2025: ratiopharm Ulm
- 2025–present: Bayern Munich

Career highlights
- Second-team All-Mountain West (2020); Third-team All-Mountain West (2019)
- Stats at Basketball Reference

Justinian Jessup (born May 23, 1998) is an American professional basketball player for Bayern Munich of the German Basketball Bundesliga (BBL) and the EuroLeague. He played college basketball for the Boise State Broncos and was selected by the Golden State Warriors with the 51st overall pick in the 2020 NBA draft.

== Early life ==
Jessup lived in Boise during fourth and fifth grades and played club basketball under former Bronco basketball player Roberto Bergersen. He spent long hours in the gym as a small child improving his basketball game.

Jessup lettered four years at Longmont High School. As a junior, he led the team in every major statistical category with averages of 17.0 points, 4.5 rebounds, 2.5 assists, and 3.2 steals per game while leading Longmont to the state title game. He was named the 2015 Colorado 4A Player of the Year, Northern League Athlete of the Year, and was selected to the all-state first team.

In his senior season, he was ranked the No. 8 prospect in Colorado. He signed his letter of intent to play for Boise State on September 12, 2015. He averaged 18.3 points and 4.9 rebounds per game and led Longmont to a 25–2 record, while once again being selected to the all-state first team and named the Northern League Athlete of the Year.

== College career ==
In his first nine games for Boise State, Jessup averaged 9.4 points per game. He scored 20 points in a win over Presbyterian, becoming the 11th Bronco freshman to score 20 points in a game. Jessup's play drew comparison to former Boise State player Anthony Drmic. “His feel for the game is so good, and he’s a worker,” coach Leon Rice said.

Jessup averaged 15.0 points per game in the first nine games of his sophomore season and led the team to an 8–1 start. Jessup was publicly reprimanded after his role in a court scuffle in a win against New Mexico on February 6, 2018. He averaged 11.6 points per game as the second option behind Chandler Hutchison and hit 46 percent of his three-point attempts.

As a junior, Jessup led the Broncos in scoring (14.0 points per game), rebounds (4.5 per game), assists (2.7 per game), steals and blocks. Jessup was named to Third-Team All Mountain West following his junior season. He played most of the season through knee pain and had surgery in April 2019.

On December 7, 2019, Jessup set career highs with 27 points and seven 3-pointers, as Boise State defeated the Colorado State Rams 75–64. Jessup made his 276th career three-pointer in a game against UNLV on January 8, 2020, breaking Anthony Drmic's Boise State record. He finished with 18 points to help the Broncos win 73–66. On February 4, 2020, Jessup broke the Mountain West Conference record for career three-pointers when he passed BYU's Jimmer Fredette's mark of 296. At the conclusion of the regular season, Jessup was named to the Second Team All-Mountain West. He averaged 16.0 points, 4.4 rebounds, 2.1 assists and 1.4 steals per game.

== Professional career ==
=== Illawarra Hawks (2020–2022) ===
He joined the Illawarra Hawks of the Australian National Basketball League (NBL) for the 2020–21 season as part of the league's Next Stars program.

After playing for the Golden State Warriors in the 2021 NBA Summer League, Jessup re-joined the Illawarra Hawks for the 2021–22 NBL season for his second season of his NBL Next Stars contract.

=== Zaragoza (2022–2023) ===
After playing for the Warriors in the 2022 NBA Summer League, Jessup joined Basket Zaragoza of the Spanish Liga ACB for the 2022–23 season. He averaged 11.6 points, 2.9 rebounds, and 1.1 assists, across 28 games.

=== New Zealand Breakers (2023–2024) ===
On August 10, 2023, Jessup signed with the New Zealand Breakers for the 2023–24 NBL season, returning to the league for a second stint. He appeared in two games before being ruled out indefinitely with a pelvic injury on October 9, 2023. He did not play again for the Breakers.

=== ratiopharm Ulm (2024–2025) ===
On March 10, 2024, Jessup signed with ratiopharm Ulm of the Basketball Bundesliga.

=== Bayern Munich (2025–present) ===
On July 9, 2025, Jessup signed with Bayern Munich of the German Basketball Bundesliga. On March 31, 2026, Jessup had his contract extended with the team through 2028.

=== Draft rights ===
Jessup was selected by the Golden State Warriors with the 51st pick in the 2020 NBA draft. On July 6, 2025, his draft rights were traded to the Memphis Grizzlies. On February 5, 2026, his draft rights were traded to the Philadelphia 76ers in exchange for Eric Gordon.

== Career statistics ==
Legend
GP	Games played	GS	Games started	MPG	Minutes per game
FG%	Field goal percentage	3P%	3-point field goal percentage	FT%	Free throw percentage
RPG	Rebounds per game	APG	Assists per game	SPG	Steals per game
BPG	Blocks per game	PPG	Points per game	**Bold**	Career high

=== College ===
Year	Team	GP	GS	MPG	FG%	3P%	FT%	RPG	APG	SPG	BPG	PPG
2016–17	Boise State	32	31	23.6	.377	.355	.767	2.8	1.4	1.0	.3	7.4
2017–18	Boise State	32	25	29.5	**.465**	**.457**	.795	**4.7**	1.8	1.3	**.6**	11.6
2018–19	Boise State	**33**	**32**	35.5	.445	.410	.731	4.5	**2.7**	1.1	.5	14.0
2019–20	Boise State	32	**32**	**36.0**	.426	.397	**.959**	4.4	2.1	**1.4**	.5	**16.0**
Career		129	120	31.2	.432	.408	.831	4.1	2.0	1.2	.5	12.3

=== NBL ===
Year	Team	GP	GS	MPG	FG%	3P%	FT%	RPG	APG	SPG	BPG	PPG
2020–21	Illawarra	38	−	30.9	.420	.343	.750	3.7	1.7	1.2	.6	13.2
2021–22	Illawarra	28	−	31.84	.450	.360	.860	3.79	1.64	1.18	.5	13.33
