= Matt Hodgson (basketball) =

Australian basketball player (born 1991)

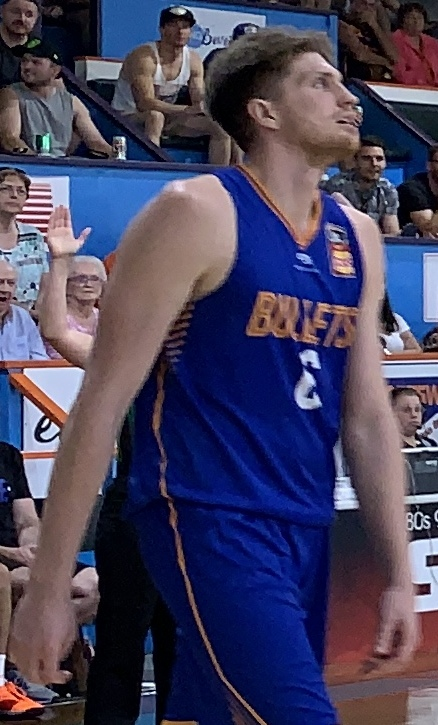
- Hodgson with the Brisbane Bullets in 2019

Personal information
- Born: 2 August 1991 (age 35) Ipswich, Queensland, Australia
- Listed height: 211 cm (6 ft 11 in)
- Listed weight: 115 kg (254 lb)

Career information
- High school: Ipswich Grammar (Ipswich, Queensland)
- College: Southern Utah (2009–2011); Saint Mary's (2012–2014)
- NBA draft: 2014: undrafted
- Playing career: 2009–present
- Position: Centre

Career history
- 2009: Australian Institute of Sport
- 2014–2015: Frankston Blues
- 2015–2018: Adelaide 36ers
- 2016: Waverley Falcons
- 2017: Knox Raiders
- 2018–2021: Brisbane Bullets
- 2020: South West Metro Pirates
- 2021–2023: Ipswich Force
- 2021–2022: Perth Wildcats
- 2022: TaiwanBeer HeroBears
- 2025: Southern Districts Spartans

Career highlights
- 2× NBL1 North champion (2023, 2025); Big V All-Star Five (2016); Big V Co-Defensive Player of the Year (2016)
Medals
Men's basketball
Representing Australia
FIBA Asia Cup
Gold medal – first place	2017 Lebanon

Matthew John Hodgson (born 2 August 1991) is an Australian professional basketball player who last played for the Southern Districts Spartans of the NBL1 North. He played college basketball for the Southern Utah Thunderbirds and Saint Mary's Gaels between 2009 and 2014 before debuting in the National Basketball League (NBL) in 2015 and playing for the Adelaide 36ers, Brisbane Bullets and Perth Wildcats.

== Early life ==
Hodgson was born in Ipswich, Queensland. He attended Ipswich Grammar School. In 2009, he attended the Australian Institute of Sport (AIS) in Canberra and played for the AIS men's team in the South East Australian Basketball League (SEABL). In four SEABL games, he averaged 3.3 points and 3.8 rebounds per game. That same year, he represented the Australian Under-19 national team at the FIBA Under-19 World Championship, helping Australia finish fourth with tournament averages of 4.6 points and 4.1 rebounds in seven games.

== College career ==
=== Southern Utah ===
As a freshman at Southern Utah in 2009–10, Hodgson was one of just two players to start every game during the season, and he set the SUU single-season blocks record with 64 rejections. In addition to leading team in blocks, he also led the squad with a field goal percentage of .584, was second on the team with 4.8 rebounds per game, was second in both offensive (1.3) and defensive (3.5) rebounds per game, and averaged 6.3 points per game, fifth on the team. On 9 January 2010, he scored a career-high 16 points in a loss to South Dakota State.

As a sophomore in 2010–11, Hodgson's role on the team dropped dramatically, only starting in 10 out of 29 appearances and managed just 13.1 minutes per game, a big drop from his 23.3 minutes per game as freshman. He still managed to score in double figures five times, and recorded one double-double with 10 points and 12 rebounds in a loss to UNLV on 18 December. He finished the season averaging 4.5 points and 3.5 rebounds per game.

=== Saint Mary's ===
In May 2011, Hodgson transferred to Saint Mary's and subsequently sat out of the 2011–12 season due to NCAA transfer regulations. He did, however, compete for Australia at the 2011 Summer Universiade where he averaged 4.7 points, 3.6 rebounds and 16.4 minutes in seven games.

As a redshirted junior in 2012–13 playing for the Gaels, Hodgson saw action in 32 games during the season, and averaged 2.8 points and 2.0 rebounds per game. He did manage to rank 11th in the West Coast Conference in blocks with 0.8 per game, and finished the season second on the team with 26 total blocks.

As a senior in 2013–14, Hodgson saw action in 34 games and received two starting assignments, finishing the season averaging averaged 3.3 points and 2.6 rebounds per game. He again finished second on the team for total blocks with 31.

=== College statistics ===
Year	Team	GP	GS	MPG	FG%	3P%	FT%	RPG	APG	SPG	BPG	PPG
2009–10	Southern Utah	29	29	23.3	.584	.000	.585	4.8	.3	.3	2.2	6.3
2010–11	Southern Utah	29	10	13.1	.531	.000	.759	3.5	.3	.3	1.2	4.5
2012–13	Saint Mary's	32	0	10.0	.514	.273	.842	2.0	.2	.1	.8	2.8
2013–14	Saint Mary's	34	2	10.5	.533	.000	.425	2.6	.1	.1	.9	3.3
Career		124	41	14.0	.546	.250	.632	3.2	.2	.2	1.3	4.2

== Professional career ==
=== Frankston Blues and Melbourne United (2014–2015) ===
After graduating from Saint Mary's, Hodgson returned to Australia and joined the Frankston Blues for the rest of the SEABL season in June 2014. He appeared in eight games for Frankston, averaging 14.4 points and 7.4 rebounds per game. He later signed with Melbourne United as a development player for the 2014–15 NBL season. However, his rookie campaign was thrown into disarray when he attempted to pass medical and fitness tests prior to the start of pre-season. After failing to pass any of the health or fitness tests with United, they sent him to get it looked at and he was told his meniscus was badly torn. He subsequently underwent surgery to repair his meniscus, and began the season spending six weeks on crutches then another four weeks with his knee in a brace. He started running again in late December and re-joined the playing group for training in mid-January, with the hope of being fit by the end of the regular season and possibly playing a few minutes in the final few games. This ultimately did not happen, and Hodgson failed to appear in a game for United during the 2014–15 season.

In May 2015, Hodgson re-joined the Frankston Blues, going on to play five games for the club while averaging 6.8 points and 5.0 rebounds per game.

=== Adelaide 36ers (2015–2018) ===
On 7 July 2015, Hodgson signed a two-year deal with the Adelaide 36ers. In his NBL debut on 7 October, the 36ers' first game of the 2015–16 season, he came off the bench to provide a spark for the team, recording 18 points, nine rebounds and three blocks in a 90–71 win over the defending champions, the New Zealand Breakers. Hodgson produced the 36ers' third best debut by an Australian, with his 18 points ranked behind only Brock Motum's 28 in 2014 and Aaron Bruce's 22 in 2008. This earned him Player of the Game honours. On 25 November, he was ruled out for two to four weeks after injuring his knee at training the previous day. He returned to action on 12 December after missing four games, recording nine points and six rebounds in 16 minutes off the bench against the Townsville Crocodiles. Hodgson appeared in 23 games for the fifth-placed 36ers in 2015–16, averaging 3.5 points and 2.4 rebounds in just over eight minutes per game.

In March 2016, Hodgson joined the Waverley Falcons for the 2016 Big V season. He helped the Falcons finish the regular season in second place on the ladder with an 18–4 record, but in the semi-finals, they were swept 2–0 by the Ringwood Hawks. In 22 games for the Falcons in 2016, he averaged 17.3 points, 10.3 rebounds and 1.5 blocks per game. He subsequently earned Big V All-Star Five honors and was named Co-Defensive Player of the Year.

After failing to record double figures in points or rebounds over the 36ers' first seven games of the 2016–17 NBL season, Hodgson had a season-best game on 12 November 2016, recording 18 points and 14 rebounds in an 85–74 loss to the Illawarra Hawks. The 36ers started the season 3–6, before going on an eight-game winning streak throughout December to head into Christmas on top of the ladder with an 11–6 record. The 36ers went on to finish the regular season as minor premiers with a 17–11 record, but were then defeated 2–1 in the semi-finals by the fourth-seeded Illawarra Hawks. Hodgson appeared in all 31 games for the 36ers in 2016–17, averaging 5.6 points and 5.7 rebounds per game.

On 15 March 2017, Hodgson signed with the Knox Raiders for the 2017 Big V season. In 16 games for the Raiders, he averaged 13.9 points and 9.6 rebounds per game.

On 28 March 2017, Hodgson re-signed with the 36ers on a two-year deal. Twelve months later, he helped the 36ers reach the 2018 NBL Grand Final series, where they lost 3–2 to Melbourne United. In 35 games for the 36ers in 2017–18, he averaged 4.5 points and 3.2 rebounds per game. On 11 April 2018, Hodgson requested a release from the final year of his contract, and the 36ers granted it.

=== Brisbane Bullets (2018–2021) ===
On 27 April 2018, Hodgson signed a one-year contract with the Brisbane Bullets. In September 2018, he suffered a calf injury while playing for the Australian Boomers, which ruled him out for three to four weeks. In 2018–19, Hodgson had a league-leading 63% field goal percentage, averaged 9.6 points and 6.1 rebounds per game, and ranking sixth in the league for blocked shots.

On 29 March 2019, Hodgson re-signed with the Bullets on a two-year deal. In 2019–20, he averaged 10.3 points and 6.4 rebounds per game and had six double doubles.

Following the 2019–20 season, Hodgson initially chose to explore European playing options, before deciding to play another NBL season with the Bullets. In 2020, he played for the South West Metro Pirates of the Queensland State League (QSL).

On 7 March 2021, Hodgson scored a career-high 24 points in the Bullets' 96–88 win over Melbourne United. He averaged 10.1 points, 6.9 rebounds, and 1.3 blocks per game during the 2020–21 season.

=== Ipswich Force, Perth Wildcats and TaiwanBeer HeroBears (2021–2023) ===
Hodgson joined the Ipswich Force of the NBL1 North for the 2021 season.

Hodgson had ambitions to go to Europe for the 2021–22 season and had some interest, but his wife was heavily pregnant at the time, so he ultimately decided to stay in Australia, signing quite late in the pre-season. On 15 October 2021, he signed with the Perth Wildcats for the 2021–22 NBL season.

In July 2022, Hodgson re-joined the Ipswich Force.

On 2 September 2022, Hodgson signed with the TaiwanBeer HeroBears of the T1 League. He played two games before being released on 26 November 2022 due to a calf injury.

Hodgson re-joined the Ipswich Force for the 2023 NBL1 North season. He helped the Force reach the grand final series, where they defeated the Gold Coast Rollers 2–1 to win the championship.

=== Southern Districts Spartans (2025) ===
Following the 2023 NBL1 season, Hodgson decided to take a break from basketball to focus on his family and explore different career opportunities. A challenging season with the Perth Wildcats, coupled with an unsuccessful stint in Taiwan, left him feeling disillusioned with the game. He returned to basketball in 2025, joining the Southern Districts Spartans of the NBL1 North. He helped the Spartans win the NBL1 North championship in the 2025 NBL1 season.

== Personal life ==
Hodgson and his wife Cashaana have a daughter.
