= Craig Moller =

Australian rules footballer and basketball player

No. 6 – ETB Miners
- Position: Power forward / small forward
- League: ProA

Personal information
- Born: 22 August 1994 (age 32) Sutherland, New South Wales, Australia
- Listed height: 203 cm (6 ft 8 in)
- Listed weight: 98 kg (216 lb)

Career information
- High school: Lucas Heights Community (Barden Ridge, New South Wales); Sydney Boys (Sydney, New South Wales)
- Playing career: 2016–present

Career history
- 2016–2017: Sydney Kings
- 2016: Sutherland Sharks
- 2016–2017: Ballarat Miners
- 2017–2019: Melbourne United
- 2018: Hobart Chargers
- 2019: Southern Huskies
- 2019–2021: Sydney Kings
- 2021–2022: Würzburg Baskets
- 2023–2024: South East Melbourne Phoenix
- 2025: Bamberg Baskets
- 2025: Taranaki Airs
- 2025–2026: Keflavík
- 2026: Otago Nuggets
- 2026–present: ETB Miners

Career highlights
- NBL champion (2018); SEABL champion (2018); 2× All-SEABL First Team (2017, 2018)

Craig Moller (born 22 August 1994) is an Australian-German professional basketball player for ETB Miners of the German ProA. He is a former professional Australian rules footballer and spent three years in the Australian Football League (AFL) with the Fremantle Football Club. In 2016, Moller changed codes and joined the Sydney Kings of the National Basketball League (NBL). In 2017, he joined Melbourne United. After two years with Melbourne, he returned to the Kings in 2019. He moved to Germany in 2021 after two more years at Sydney. He holds a German passport.

== Football career ==
Craig Moller

Personal information
- Original team: Sydney Uni (NEAFL)
- Draft: #46, 2013 Rookie Draft, Fremantle
- Height: 203 cm (6 ft 8 in)
- Weight: 94 kg (207 lb)
- Position: Ruckman

Playing career^{1}
Years	Club	Games (Goals)
2013–2015	Fremantle	1 (0)
- ^{1} Playing statistics correct to the end of 2015.

As a junior, Moller played football for the Cronulla Sharks Junior Australian Football Club and was part of basketball's national junior development program and considered a future NBL player capable of representing Australia. He played football and basketball at both Lucas Heights Community School and Sydney Boys High School. At age 14, the Fremantle Football Club began developing Moller via the New South Wales AFL Scholarship Scheme. Joining Fremantle on a three-year scholarship, Moller travelled to Fremantle twice a year and went on three training trips to Melbourne. At the under-16 level, he began playing for the Sydney University Australian National Football Club in the North East Australian Football League, and in 2012, he spent part of the season playing for the GWS reserves. In December 2012, he was officially drafted by Fremantle in the 2013 rookie draft.

After spending most of the 2013 season playing for Peel Thunder in the West Australian Football League (WAFL), Moller was elevated to the Fremantle senior list prior to the final round of the 2013 AFL season for the team's game against St Kilda at Etihad Stadium. He was then a late inclusion in the side as the substitute player when many senior players were rested ahead of the finals.

Moller continued on with Fremantle in 2014 and 2015, but did not manage another AFL game, playing out both seasons in the WAFL with Peel Thunder. Following the conclusion of the 2015 AFL season, Moller was delisted by Fremantle.

== Basketball career ==
In early January 2016, Moller began training with the National Basketball League's Sydney Kings. He and fellow Australian centre Jordan Vandenberg were brought in for tryouts by the Kings as potential injury replacements for Julian Khazzouh. Moller ultimately lost to Vandenberg for the spot but stayed on with the team as a full-time training squad member. With an injury to back-up forward Jeromie Hill in early February, Moller was elevated to the Kings' playing roster for their match against the Perth Wildcats in Sydney on 10 February, the second last game of the Kings' 2015–16 season. He made his NBL debut in that game, entering the contest for the final one minute and 47 seconds of the last quarter.

In March 2016, Moller joined the Sutherland Sharks for the start of the 2016 Waratah League season. On 22 April 2016, after averaging 19 points and 11 rebounds in six games for Sutherland, Moller signed a short-term deal with the Ballarat Miners of the South East Australian Basketball League. He was retained by the Miners for another month on 16 June. In 13 games for the Miners, Moller averaged 10.3 points, 9.7 rebounds and 1.9 assists per game.

On 21 September 2016, Moller signed with the Sydney Kings as a development player for the 2016–17 NBL season. In the Kings' season opener on 8 October 2016, Moller played 13½ minutes off the bench and recorded four rebounds and one assist in a 77–73 loss to the Brisbane Bullets. Moller was promoted to the full-time team midway through the season following the departure of American import Steve Blake. He appeared in 13 games for the Kings in 2016–17, averaging 3.3 points and 2.3 rebounds per game.

Moller returned to the Ballarat Miners for the 2017 SEABL season. He was named SEABL Player of the Week for Round 3 and 11. In 22 games for the Miners, he averaged 17.7 points, 10.8 rebounds and 3.0 assists per game.

On 13 April 2017, Moller signed a three-year deal with Melbourne United. In March 2018, he helped Melbourne win the NBL championship. He joined the Hobart Chargers for the 2018 SEABL season. He was named SEABL Player of the Week for Round 8. In August 2018, he helped the Chargers win the SEABL Championship. In 23 games, he averaged 23.2 points, 12.1 rebounds, 3.0 assists and 1.2 steals per game.

Moller returned to United for the 2018–19 NBL season and averaged 3.9 points and 2.7 rebounds in 34 games. Following the season, he joined the Southern Huskies for the 2019 New Zealand NBL season.

On 15 April 2019, Moller signed a two-year deal with Sydney Kings, returning to the team for a second stint. He appeared in the first 11 games of the 2019–20 season before missing the next 16 games with a right ankle injury. He returned for the Kings' final regular season game. He continued with the Kings in the 2020–21 NBL season.

In June 2021, Moller signed with s.Oliver Würzburg of the German Basketball Bundesliga.

Moller missed the 2022–23 season with a knee injury.

On 2 August 2023, Moller signed with the South East Melbourne Phoenix for the 2023–24 NBL season. On 4 December 2023, he was ruled out for the rest of the season with a ruptured patella tendon in his right knee.

On 10 January 2025, Moller signed with Bamberg Baskets of the German Basketball Bundesliga. He played 18 games to finish the 2024–25 season, averaging 2.0 points and 1.8 rebounds per game.

On 29 May 2025, Moller signed with the Taranaki Airs for the rest of the 2025 New Zealand NBL season.

In September 2025, Moller signed with Keflavík of the Icelandic Úrvalsdeild karla.

On 22 May 2026, Moller signed with the Otago Nuggets for the rest of the 2026 New Zealand NBL season.

On 1 August 2026, Moller signed with ETB Miners Essen of the German ProA.

=== National team career ===
In November 2018, Moller was called-up to the Australian Boomers squad for the team's next window of 2019 FIBA World Cup qualifiers.

In February 2022, Moller was named in a 17-man Boomers squad ahead of the FIBA World Cup Qualifiers in Japan.

== Personal life ==
Moller's grandfather was born in Lüneburg and spent much of his early life in Germany. Moller's grandmother was born in Grenoble, France. They met on the boat that they both immigrated to Australia on in the early 1950s.
