= Mitch McCarron =

Australian basketball player (born 1992)

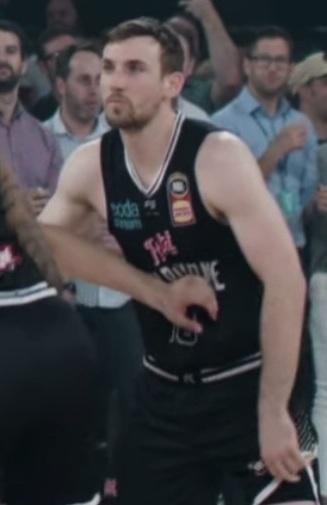
- McCarron with Melbourne United in 2020

No. 12 – Eltham Wildcats
- Position: Shooting guard
- League: NBL1 South

Personal information
- Born: 30 June 1992 (age 34) Alice Springs, Northern Territory, Australia
- Listed height: 189 cm (6 ft 2 in)
- Listed weight: 97 kg (214 lb)

Career information
- High school: Genesis Christian College (Brisbane, Queensland)
- College: Metro State (2012–2015)
- NBA draft: 2015: undrafted
- Playing career: 2010–present

Career history
- 2010: Australian Institute of Sport
- 2011–2012: Brisbane Capitals
- 2013–2015: Northside Wizards
- 2015–2016: Palencia
- 2016–2018: Cairns Taipans
- 2017: Super City Rangers
- 2018: Petrol Olimpija
- 2018–2021: Melbourne United
- 2019: Southland Sharks
- 2021–2022: Northside Wizards
- 2021–2024: Adelaide 36ers
- 2023: West Adelaide Bearcats
- 2024: Taranaki Airs
- 2024–2025: New Zealand Breakers
- 2025–present: Eltham Wildcats

Career highlights
- NBL1 Central champion (2023); NBL champion (2021); Slovenian League champion (2018); LEB Oro champion (2016); All-NBL Second Team (2021); NZNBL All-Star Five (2017); 2× QBL U23 Youth Player of the Year (2013, 2014); NABC Division II Player of the Year (2015); RMAC Player of the Year (2015); 3× First-team All-RMAC (2013–2015)
Medals
Men's basketball
Representing Australia
FIBA Asia Cup
Gold medal – first place	2017 Lebanon
Gold medal – first place	2022 Jakarta

Mitchell James Robert McCarron (born 30 June 1992) is an Australian professional basketball player for the Eltham Wildcats of the NBL1 South. He played college basketball in the United States for Metropolitan State University of Denver (Metro State) between 2012 and 2015. He played in the National Basketball League (NBL) between 2016 and 2025.

== Early life and career ==
McCarron was born in Alice Springs and lived there until the age of three. He attended Genesis Christian College in Brisbane.

In 2010, McCarron attended the Australian Institute of Sport (AIS) in Canberra and played for the AIS men's team in the South East Australian Basketball League (SEABL). In 2011 and 2012, McCarron played for the Brisbane Capitals in the Queensland Basketball League (QBL). He continued to return to the QBL during his college off-seasons, playing for the Northside Wizards in 2013, 2014 and 2015.

== College career ==
McCarron played college basketball in the United States for Metropolitan State University of Denver (Metro State). After redshirting the 2011–12 season, he played three seasons for the Roadrunners between 2012 and 2015. He led the team to back-to-back NCAA Division II Final Four appearances, including a runner-up finish in 2013. He averaged 16.3 points and 6.7 rebounds for his career and in 2015 was named NABC Player of the Year.

== Professional career ==
=== NBL and Europe ===
McCarron made his professional debut with Palencia Baloncesto of the Spanish LEB Oro in the 2015–16 season. In 30 games, he averaged 7.6 points, 2.9 rebounds, 1.1 assists and 1.0 steals per game.

On 13 May 2016, McCarron signed a two-year deal with the Cairns Taipans of the National Basketball League (NBL). Following the 2017–18 NBL season, he had a stint with Petrol Olimpija in Slovenia.

On 8 June 2018, McCarron signed a three-year deal with Melbourne United. In the 2020–21 NBL season, he averaged 10.2 points, 5.0 rebounds, and 5.1 assists per game and helped United win the NBL championship.

On 13 July 2021, McCarron signed a three-year deal with the Adelaide 36ers. In the 2022–23 NBL season, he averaged 7.8 points, 3.8 rebounds, 3.5 assists and 1.6 steals per game. He recommitted to the 36ers for the 2023–24 NBL season.

On 25 April 2024, McCarron signed a two-year deal with the New Zealand Breakers. In November 2024, he played his 250th NBL game. He parted ways with the Breakers following the 2024–25 NBL season.

On 15 May 2025, McCarron announced his retirement from the NBL after nine seasons and 270 games.

=== Australian state leagues and NZNBL ===
McCarron joined the Super City Rangers for the 2017 New Zealand NBL season, where he earned league All-Star Five honours. He joined the Southland Sharks for the 2019 New Zealand NBL season, but only played three games due to injury.

McCarron had a two-game stint with the Northside Wizards of the NBL1 North during the 2021 season. He returned to the Northside Wizards for the 2022 NBL1 North season. He joined the West Adelaide Bearcats of the NBL1 Central for the 2023 season.

McCarron joined the Taranaki Airs for the 2024 New Zealand NBL season.

McCarron joined the Eltham Wildcats of the NBL1 South for the 2025 season. He re-signed with Eltham for the 2026 season, helping the Wildcats reach the NBL1 South Grand Final, where they lost 78–75 to the Frankston Blues.

== National team career ==
McCarron played for Australia at the 2010 FIBA Oceania Under-18 Championship and the 2011 FIBA Under-19 World Championship.

McCarron made his debut for the Australian Boomers at the 2017 FIBA Asia Cup. He played for the Australia during the 2019 FIBA World Cup Asian qualifiers, at the 2022 FIBA Asia Cup, and again during the 2023 FIBA World Cup Asian qualifiers. In February 2025, McCarron was named in the Boomers squad for two FIBA Asia Cup qualifiers.

McCarron competed for Australia 3x3 team at the 2023 FIBA 3x3 World Cup.

== Personal life ==
McCarron and his wife Abby have two children.

In June 2025, McCarron was appointed General Manager of Player Relations and Engagement for the Australian Basketball Players' Association (ABPA). Prior to this appointment, he served on the ABPA board. As of August 2026, he remained in the GM of player relations and engagement role along with being director of coaching and pathways with the Eltham Wildcats.
