= Ben Moore (basketball) =

American basketball player (born 1995)

- Moore with PAOK Thessaloniki in 2026

No. 26 – PAOK Thessaloniki
- Position: Center / power forward
- League: Greek Basketball League; EuroCup

Personal information
- Born: May 13, 1995 (age 31) Bolingbrook, Illinois, U.S.
- Listed height: 6 ft 8 in (2.03 m)
- Listed weight: 220 lb (100 kg)

Career information
- High school: Bolingbrook (Bolingbrook, Illinois)
- College: SMU (2013–2017)
- NBA draft: 2017: undrafted
- Playing career: 2017–present

Career history
- 2017–2018: Fort Wayne Mad Ants
- 2018: Indiana Pacers
- 2018: →Fort Wayne Mad Ants
- 2018: Fort Wayne Mad Ants
- 2018–2019: Austin Spurs
- 2019: Galatasaray
- 2019–2020: Fort Wayne Mad Ants
- 2020–2021: South East Melbourne Phoenix
- 2022: Memphis Hustle
- 2022: Mets de Guaynabo
- 2022–2023: Hapoel Be'er Sheva
- 2023–2024: Bodrumspor
- 2024–2025: Hapoel Gilboa Galil
- 2025–present: PAOK Thessaloniki

Career highlights
- Greek League rebounding leader (2026); Second-team All-AAC (2017)
- Stats at NBA.com
- Stats at Basketball Reference

Benjamin Alexander Moore (born May 13, 1995) is an American professional basketball player for PAOK Thessaloniki of the Greek Basketball League (GBL) and the EuroCup. He played college basketball for the SMU Mustangs.

== College career ==
Moore came to SMU from Bolingbrook High School in Bolingbrook, Illinois where he was an all-state honorable mention honoree and a finalist for Illinois Mr. Basketball. During his freshman season he was named American Athletic Conference Rookie of the Week three times on November 11, 2013, January 27 and February 10, 2014. He finished his college career averaging 9 points and 5.8 rebounds a game.

== Professional career ==
=== Fort Wayne Mad Ants (2017–2018) ===
Moore went undrafted for the 2017 NBA draft. On June 23, 2017, Moore signed a partially-guaranteed contract with the Indiana Pacers to be able to join their roster for the 2017 NBA Summer League. On August 15, 2017, Moore signed with the Fort Wayne Mad Ants of the NBA G League as an affiliate player from the Indiana Pacers.

=== Indiana Pacers (2018) ===
On January 12, 2018, Moore signed a two-way contract with the Indiana Pacers. Throughout the rest of the season, he split his playing time between the Pacers and their NBA G League affiliate, the Fort Wayne Mad Ants. Moore made his NBA debut on January 24, 2018, against the Phoenix Suns, playing three minutes. On September 21, 2018, Moore re-signed with the Pacers. On November 3, 2018, Moore was waived by the Indiana Pacers.

=== Second Stint with Fort Wayne Mad Ants (2018) ===
On November 6, 2018, the Fort Wayne Mad Ants announced that they had reacquired Moore.

=== San Antonio Spurs (2018–2019) ===
Moore signed a two-way contract with the San Antonio Spurs, splitting time with the Austin Spurs of the G League, on November 20, 2018. On July 1, 2019, it was reported that no qualifying offer was issued for Moore, despite that Moore was listed in the Spurs' roster for 2019 NBA Summer League hosted at Vivint Smart Home Arena.

=== Galatasaray Doğa Sigorta (2019) ===
On September 12, 2019, he has signed with Galatasaray Doğa Sigorta of the Basketbol Süper Ligi. On December 2, 2019, he parted ways with Galatasaray.

=== Third Stint with Fort Wayne Mad Ants (2019–2020) ===
On December 12, 2019, the Fort Wayne Mad Ants announced that they had acquired Moore. In a game against the Capital City Go-Go on January 13, 2020, Moore scored 17 points and grabbed a career-high 19 rebounds. He averaged 13.9 points and 9.2 rebounds per game.

=== South East Melbourne Phoenix (2020–2021) ===
On November 9, 2020, Moore signed a one-year deal with the South East Melbourne Phoenix of the National Basketball League (NBL). He averaged 10.4 points and 6.4 rebounds per game.

=== Memphis Hustle (2022) ===
On February 6, 2022, Moore was acquired by the Memphis Hustle of the NBA G League.

=== Mets de Guaynabo (2022) ===
On April 2, 2022, Moore signed with the Mets de Guaynabo of the BSN. He averaged 18.1 points (8th in the league), 9.1 rebounds (6th), 1 steal, and 1 block per game, with a .630 field goal percentage (7th).

=== Hapoel Be'er Sheva (2022–2023) ===
On July 30, 2022, he signed with Hapoel Be'er Sheva of the Israeli Basketball Premier League.

=== Çağdaş Bodrumspor (2023–2024) ===
On July 10, 2023, he signed with Çağdaş Bodrumspor of the Basketbol Süper Ligi.

=== PAOK Thessaloniki (2025–present) ===
On July 23, 2025, Moore signed with PAOK of the Greek Basketball League for the 2025–26 season.

Moore became one of PAOK's key players during the 2025–26 season. In the regular season of the 2025–26 Greek Basket League, he led the league in both total performance index rating, with 390 ranking points, and rebounding, collecting 169 rebounds in 24 games (7.0 per game). He finished the regular season averaging 12.0 points, 7.0 rebounds and 1.3 assists per game, while recording four double-doubles.

Moore also played a significant role in PAOK's run to the 2025–26 FIBA Europe Cup Final. In 18 games in the competition, he averaged 10.4 points, 6.8 rebounds and 1.6 assists per game. Among his notable moments was converting two free throws with no time remaining against Braunschweig, securing PAOK's qualification for the round of 16.

Having earned the confidence of incoming head coach Andrea Trinchieri, Moore became the first player retained as part of PAOK's planning for the 2026–27 season. On May 13, 2026, PAOK announced that Moore had signed a two-year contract extension, keeping him with the club through the 2027–28 season.

== Career statistics ==
Legend
GP	Games played	GS	Games started	MPG	Minutes per game
FG%	Field goal percentage	3P%	3-point field goal percentage	FT%	Free throw percentage
RPG	Rebounds per game	APG	Assists per game	SPG	Steals per game
BPG	Blocks per game	PPG	Points per game	**Bold**	Career high

=== Regular season ===
Year	Team	GP	GS	MPG	FG%	3P%	FT%	RPG	APG	SPG	BPG	PPG
2017–18	Indiana	2	0	4.5	–	–	–	.5	.5	.0	.0	.0
Career		2	0	4.5	–	–	–	.5	.5	.0	.0	.0
