= 2020–21 NBL season =

Professional basketball season

- League: National Basketball League
- Season: 2020–21
- Duration: 15 January – 25 June 2021
- Games played: 162
- Teams: 9
- TV partners: Australia: SBS Viceland ESPN; New Zealand: Sky Sport; Online: SBS On Demand NBL TV Twitch

Regular season
- Season champions: Melbourne United
- Cup champions: Perth Wildcats (1st title)
- Cup runners-up: S.E. Melbourne Phoenix
- Season MVP: (United States) Bryce Cotton (Perth)

Finals
- Champions: Melbourne United (6th title)
- Runners-up: Perth Wildcats
- Semi-finalists: Illawarra Hawks; S.E. Melbourne Phoenix
- Finals MVP: (Australia) Jock Landale (Melbourne)

Statistical leaders
Points	(United States) Bryce Cotton (Perth)	23.5
Rebounds	(United States) John Mooney (Perth)	11.4
Assists	(Australia) Josh Giddey (Adelaide)	7.6
Efficiency	(Australia) David Andersen (Melbourne)	67%

Records
- Biggest home win: 29 points Phoenix 106–77 Taipans (19 March 2021)
- Biggest away win: 32 points Hawks 63–95 Phoenix (1 April 2021)
- Highest scoring: 227 points Bullets 108–119 Kings (13 March 2021)
- Winning streak: 11 games Melbourne United (21 March – 2 May 2021)
- Losing streak: 8 games Cairns Taipans (25 April – 26 May 2021)
- Highest attendance: 12,185 – RAC Arena; Wildcats vs United (4 June 2021)
- Lowest attendance: 809 – John Cain Arena; Bullets vs Hawks; Taipans vs Wildcats (26 February 2021)
- Attendance: 572,950
- Average attendance: 3,951

NBL seasons
- ← 2019–20 2021–22 →
- All statistics correct as of 25 June 2021.

The 2020–21 NBL season was the 43rd season of the National Basketball League since its establishment in 1979. A total of nine teams contested in the 2020–21 season. The regular season was played between January and June 2021, followed by a post-season in June 2021.

Australian broadcast rights to the season were held by SBS Viceland in the second year of a two-year deal. All games were available live and free on streaming platforms such as SBS On Demand. ESPN also broadcast select games, including all games after 7.30pm AEDT. In New Zealand, Sky Sport were the official league broadcaster. The NBL continued broadcasting games online on Twitch in the second year of a two-year deal.

== Teams ==
Nine teams competed in the 2020–21 season, with the Tasmania JackJumpers set to enter the league for the 2021–22 season.

During the off-season the Illawarra Hawks were renamed to The Hawks after the new ownership group announced they wanted to expand out from Illawarra and into the wider region.

On 9 February 2021, the NBL reinstated the Illawarra Hawks name following an increase in support from the local community.

=== Stadiums and locations ===
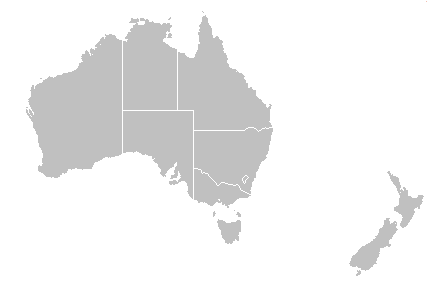

Team	Location	Stadium	Capacity
Adelaide 36ers	Adelaide	Adelaide Entertainment Centre	11,300
Brisbane Bullets	Brisbane	Nissan Arena	5,000
Cairns Taipans	Cairns	Cairns Pop-Up Arena	2,000
Illawarra Hawks	Wollongong	WIN Entertainment Centre	6,000
Melbourne United	Melbourne	John Cain Arena	10,500
Melbourne United	Melbourne	Bendigo Stadium	4,000
New Zealand Breakers	Auckland	Spark Arena	9,300
New Zealand Breakers	Auckland	The Trusts Arena	4,900
New Zealand Breakers	Auckland	TSB Stadium	4,500
New Zealand Breakers	Auckland	Christchurch Arena	7,200
New Zealand Breakers	Auckland	Energy Events Centre	3,500
New Zealand Breakers	Auckland	Franklin Pool and Leisure Centre	1,100
New Zealand Breakers	Auckland	Silverdome	3,255
New Zealand Breakers	Auckland	Bendigo Stadium	4,000
Perth Wildcats	Perth	RAC Arena	14,800
South East Melbourne Phoenix	Melbourne	John Cain Arena	10,500
South East Melbourne Phoenix	Melbourne	State Basketball Centre	3,200
Sydney Kings	Sydney	Qudos Bank Arena	18,200

=== Personnel and sponsorship ===
Team	Coach	Captain	Main sponsor	Kit manufacturer
Adelaide 36ers	(United States) Conner Henry	(Australia) Daniel Dillon (Australia) Daniel Johnson (Australia) Brendan Teys	Scouts Australia	Champion
Brisbane Bullets	(Australia) Andrej Lemanis	(Australia) Jason Cadee	St. Genevieve	Champion
Cairns Taipans	(United States) Mike Kelly	(Brazil) Scott Machado	CQUniversity	Champion
Illawarra Hawks	(United States) Brian Goorjian	(Australia) Andrew Ogilvy	Pepper Money	Champion
Melbourne United	(Australia) Dean Vickerman	(Australia) Chris Goulding (Australia) Mitch McCarron	SodaStream	Champion
New Zealand Breakers	(Israel) Dan Shamir	(New Zealand) Thomas Abercrombie	Sky Sport	Champion
Perth Wildcats	(Australia) Trevor Gleeson	(Australia) Jesse Wagstaff	Pentanet	Champion
South East Melbourne Phoenix	(Australia) Simon Mitchell	(Australia) Kyle Adnam (Australia) Adam Gibson	Mountain Goat Beer	Champion
Sydney Kings	(Australia) Adam Forde	(Australia) Daniel Kickert (United States) Casper Ware	Brydens Lawyers	Champion

=== Player transactions ===
Free agency negotiations were delayed until 15 July 2020, after the NBL and the Australian Basketball Players' Association postponed the original start date of 30 March 2020 due to the effects of the COVID-19 pandemic. On 17 April 2020, the NBL, the Australian Basketball Players' Association and the nine clubs reached an agreement in response to the financial pressure caused by the pandemic, which reduced the salaries of players signed for the 2020–21 season, lowered the full-time roster positions from 11 to 10 players (plus a Next Star slot) and from three import slots to two import slots.

=== Coaching transactions ===
Team	Role	2019–20 season	2020–21 season
Adelaide 36ers	Head coach	Joey Wright	Conner Henry
Adelaide 36ers	Assistant	Kevin Brooks	Jamie Pearlman
Adelaide 36ers	Assistant	Darren Golley	N/A
Adelaide 36ers	Assistant	Andrew Jantke	N/A
Brisbane Bullets	Assistant	Sam Mackinnon	Greg Vanderjagt
Brisbane Bullets	Assistant	Mick Downer	N/A
Illawarra Hawks	Head coach	Matt Flinn	Brian Goorjian
Illawarra Hawks	Assistant	Ben Bagoly	Jacob Jackomas
Illawarra Hawks	Assistant	Eric Cooks	Shaun Roger
Illawarra Hawks	Assistant	Tyson Demos	N/A
Melbourne United	Assistant	Ross McMains	Darryl McDonald
New Zealand Breakers	Assistant	Zico Coronel	Chanel Pompallier
New Zealand Breakers	Assistant	N/A	Jacob Mooallem
SEM Phoenix	Assistant	Ian Stacker	N/A
Sydney Kings	Head coach	Will Weaver	Adam Forde
Sydney Kings	Assistant	Adam Forde	Kevin Lisch
Sydney Kings	Assistant	N/A	Sam Gruggen
Sydney Kings	Assistant	N/A	Lachlan Lonergan

== Pre-season ==
The pre-season games began on 13 November 2020, and ran until 10 January 2021.

=== Ladder ===
2020–21 NBL pre-season ladder
Ladder
Information

Pos.	Nat.	Name	Pld.	W.	L.	Last 5	Streak	Home	Away	For	Against	Pts %	Win %
1	(Australia)	Melbourne	1	1	0	1–0	W1	0–0	1–0	97	81	119.75%	100.00%
2	(Australia)	Sydney	1	1	0	1–0	W1	1–0	0–0	98	89	110.11%	100.00%
3	(Australia)	Adelaide	3	2	1	2–1	L1	2–0	0–1	276	225	122.67%	66.67%
4	(Australia)	Perth (RC)	2	1	1	1–1	L1	1–1	0–0	165	165	100.00%	50.00%
5	(Australia)	Cairns	2	1	1	1–1	W1	1–1	0–0	177	185	95.68%	50.00%
6	(Australia)	Brisbane	4	2	2	2–2	W2	2–0	0–2	347	378	91.80%	50.00%
7	(Australia)	Illawarra	3	1	2	1–2	L1	0–0	1–2	254	263	96.58%	33.33%
8	(Australia)	S.E. Melbourne	2	0	2	0–2	L2	0–0	0–2	198	210	94.29%	0.00%

Total Rounds
5 weeks

Total Games
11 games

Legend
- (RC) Reigning Champion

- Updated: 9 January 2021

== Regular season ==
The regular season which was due to begin in early October, began on 15 January 2021 after it was delayed twice due to the COVID-19 pandemic. It consisted of 162 games spread across 21 rounds, with the final game being played on 8 June 2021.

=== Ladder ===
Pos	2020–21 NBL season											
Pos	Team	Pld	W	L	PCT	Last 5	Streak	Home	Away	PF	PA	PP
1	Melbourne United	36	28	8	77.78%	4–1	W3	14–4	14–4	3189	2956	107.88%
2	Perth Wildcats	36	25	11	69.44%	3–2	L2	13–5	12–6	3133	2900	108.03%
3	Illawarra Hawks	36	20	16	55.56%	4–1	L1	11–7	9–9	2962	2954	100.27%
4	S.E. Melbourne Phoenix	36	19	17	52.78%	2–3	L1	9–9	10–8	3217	3124	102.98%
5	Sydney Kings	36	19	17	52.78%	4–1	W3	11–7	8–10	3112	3087	100.81%
6	Brisbane Bullets	36	18	18	50.00%	4–1	W1	9–9	9–9	3204	3274	97.86%
7	Adelaide 36ers	36	13	23	36.11%	0–5	L7	10–8	3–15	2985	3156	94.58%
8	New Zealand Breakers	36	12	24	33.33%	2–3	L1	8–10	4–14	2937	3021	97.22%
9	Cairns Taipans	36	8	28	22.22%	1–4	L2	6–12	2–16	2940	3207	91.67%

Updated to match(es) played on 9 June 2021. Source: NBL.com.au

=== Ladder progression ===
- Numbers highlighted in green indicate that the team finished the round inside the top four.
- Numbers highlighted in blue indicates the team finished first on the ladder in that round.
- Numbers highlighted in red indicates the team finished last place on the ladder in that round.

2020–21 NBL season
Team	1	2	3	4	5	NBL Cup				10	11	12	13	14	15	16	17	18	19	20	21
Team	1	2	3	4	5	6	7	8	9	10	11	12	13	14	15	16	17	18	19	20	21
Adelaide 36ers	3	5	3	3	3	4	6	5	7	7	7	7	7	7	7	7	7	7	7	7	7
Brisbane Bullets	6	9	5	6	6	7	5	4	5	5	6	6	5	6	6	6	6	6	6	6	6
Cairns Taipans	4	7	8	8	8	8	9	9	9	9	9	9	9	9	9	9	9	9	9	9	9
Illawarra Hawks	2	3	1	2	2	2	4	3	3	4	3	5	4	5	5	5	5	4	4	3	3
Melbourne United	1	1	2	1	1	1	1	1	1	2	2	2	1	1	1	1	1	1	1	1	1
New Zealand Breakers	–	8	9	9	9	9	8	8	8	8	8	8	8	8	8	8	8	8	8	8	8
Perth Wildcats	–	2	4	7	7	3	2	2	2	1	1	1	2	2	2	2	2	2	2	2	2
S.E. Melbourne Phoenix	7	6	6	4	4	5	3	7	4	3	4	3	3	3	4	4	4	3	3	4	4
Sydney Kings	5	4	7	5	5	6	7	6	6	6	5	4	6	4	3	3	3	5	5	5	5

=== NBL Cup ===
The 2020–21 season sees the introduction of the NBL Cup, which was a tournament based in Melbourne ran from 20 February to 14 March 2021.

Pos	2021 NBL Cup													
Pos	Team	Pld	W	L	PCT	Last 5	Streak	Home	Away	PF	PA	PP	QW	Pts
1	Perth Wildcats	8	7	1	87.50%	4–1	W3	3–1	4–0	745	680	109.56%	18.5	39.5
2	S.E. Melbourne Phoenix	8	5	3	62.50%	3–2	W3	3–1	2–2	748	704	106.25%	18.5	33.5
3	Brisbane Bullets	8	5	3	62.50%	3–2	L1	5–3	2–2	795	785	101.27%	17.5	32.5
4	Melbourne United	8	4	4	50.00%	2–3	L3	2–2	2–2	674	677	99.56%	17	29
5	Sydney Kings	8	4	4	50.00%	2–3	W1	2–2	2–2	747	729	102.47%	16.5	28.5
6	Illawarra Hawks	8	4	4	50.00%	3–2	W2	3–1	1–3	698	693	100.72%	16.5	28.5
7	New Zealand Breakers	8	3	5	37.50%	2–3	L2	2–2	1–3	703	710	99.01%	13	22
8	Adelaide 36ers	8	2	6	25.00%	1–4	L2	2–2	0–4	673	751	89.61%	14	20
9	Cairns Taipans	8	2	6	25.00%	1–4	L3	2–2	0–4	677	731	92.61%	12.5	18.5

Updated to match(es) played on 14 March 2021. Source: nblcup.com.au

Perth Wildcats won the inaugural NBL Cup trophy with a 7–1 record in eight games played.

== Finals ==
The 2021 NBL Finals was played in June 2021, consisting of two best-of-three semi-final series and a best-of-five Grand Final series. In the semi-finals, the higher seed hosted the first and third games. In the Grand Final, the higher seed usually hosts the first, third and fifth games. However, due to the border restrictions by the Western Australian state government, Perth Wildcats (the lower seed) hosted the first two games, while Melbourne United hosted the third game (and would have also hosted the fourth and fifth games had they not already won the series by the third game).

=== Playoff bracket ===
Semifinals
1	Melbourne United	96	79	84
4	S.E. Melbourne Phoenix	78	90	74
2	Perth Wildcats	72	75	79
3	Illawarra Hawks	74	71	71

Grand Final
1	Melbourne United	73	83	81	X	X
2	Perth Wildcats	70	74	76	X	X

== Awards ==
=== Regular season ===
==== Player of the Week ====
Rounds	Player	Team
Round 1	Justin Simon	The Hawks
Round 2	Isaac Humphries	Adelaide 36ers
Round 3	Vic Law	Brisbane Bullets
Round 3	Nathan Sobey	Brisbane Bullets
Round 4	Scott Machado	Cairns Taipans
Round 5	Tyler Harvey	Illawarra Hawks
Round 6	Mitch Creek	South East Melbourne Phoenix
Round 7	Mitch McCarron	Melbourne United
Round 8	John Mooney	Perth Wildcats
Round 9	Josh Giddey	Adelaide 36ers
Round 10	Bryce Cotton	Perth Wildcats
Round 11	John Mooney	Perth Wildcats
Round 12	Jarell Martin	Sydney Kings
Round 13	Tyler Harvey	Illawarra Hawks
Round 14	Cameron Oliver	Cairns Taipans
Round 15	Jordan Hunter	Sydney Kings
Round 16	John Mooney	Perth Wildcats
Round 17	Bryce Cotton	Perth Wildcats
Round 18	Keifer Sykes	South East Melbourne Phoenix
Round 19	Finn Delany	New Zealand Breakers
Round 20	Tyler Harvey	Illawarra Hawks
Round 21	Nathan Sobey	Brisbane Bullets

==== Awards Night ====
- Most Valuable Player (Andrew Gaze Trophy): Bryce Cotton (Perth Wildcats)
- Rookie of the Year: Josh Giddey (Adelaide 36ers)
- Best Defensive Player (Damian Martin Trophy): Justin Simon (Illawarra Hawks)
- Best Sixth Man: Jo Lual-Acuil (Melbourne United)
- Most Improved Player: Sam Froling (Illawarra Hawks)
- Fans MVP: Bryce Cotton (Perth Wildcats)
- Coach of the Year (Lindsay Gaze Trophy): Trevor Gleeson (Perth Wildcats)
- Executive of the Year: Mark Boyd (Melbourne United)
- Referee of the Year: Chris Reid
- Most Outstanding Media Coverage: Olgun Uluc (ESPN)
- GameTime by Kmart: Kyle Adnam (South East Melbourne Phoenix)
- All-NBL First Team:
  - Bryce Cotton (Perth Wildcats)
  - Nathan Sobey (Brisbane Bullets)
  - Tyler Harvey (Illawarra Hawks)
  - John Mooney (Perth Wildcats)
  - Jock Landale (Melbourne United)
- All-NBL Second Team:
  - Chris Goulding (Melbourne United)
  - Casper Ware (Sydney Kings)
  - Mitch McCarron (Melbourne United)
  - Mitch Creek (South East Melbourne Phoenix)
  - Finn Delany (New Zealand Breakers)

=== Postseason ===
- Grand Final Series MVP (Larry Sengstock Medal): Jock Landale (Melbourne United)
