= Keifer Sykes =

American basketball player (born 1993)

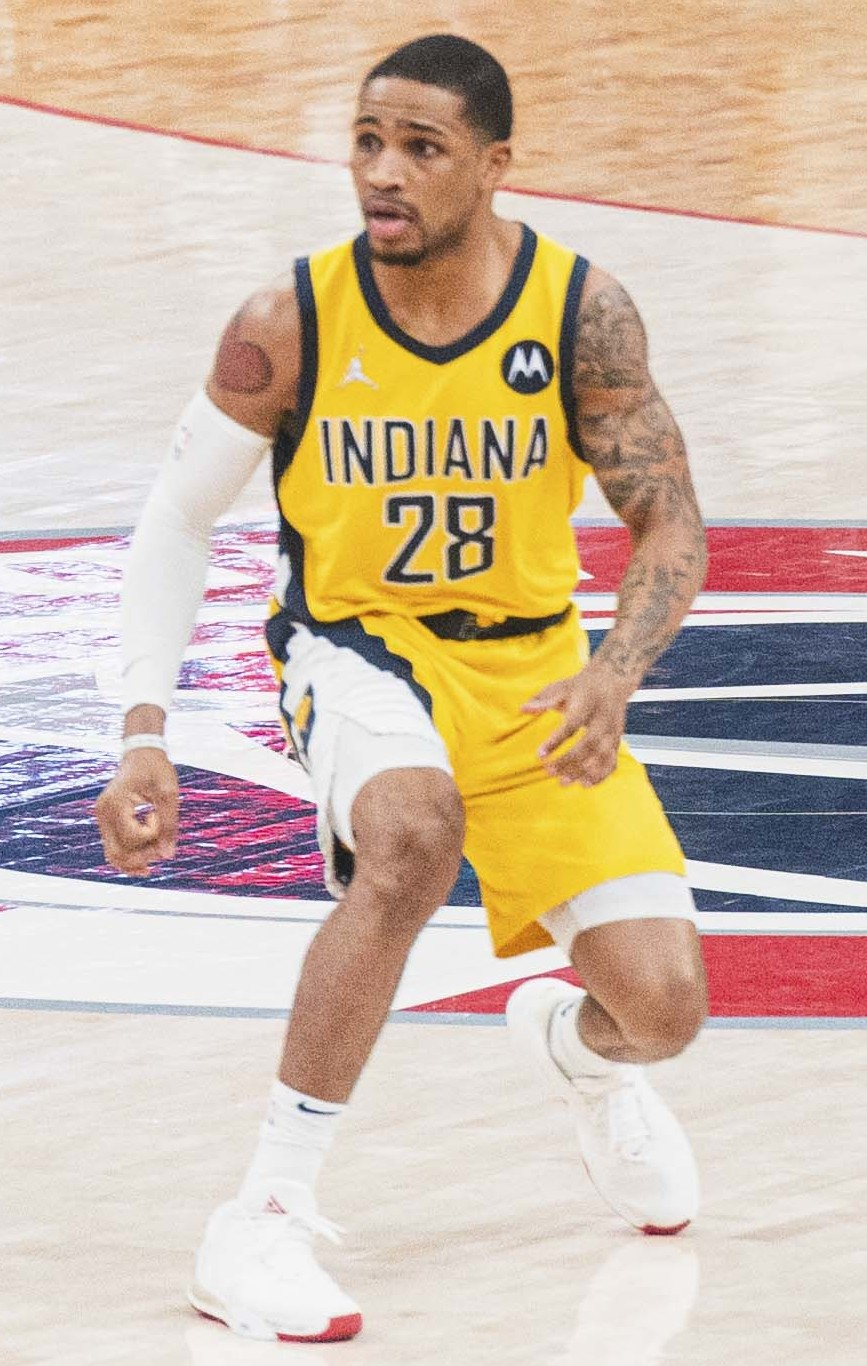
- Sykes with the Indiana Pacers in 2022

Free agent
- Position: Point guard

Personal information
- Born: December 30, 1993 (age 32) Chicago, Illinois, U.S.
- Listed height: 5 ft 11 in (1.80 m)
- Listed weight: 167 lb (76 kg)

Career information
- High school: John Marshall (Chicago, Illinois)
- College: Green Bay (2011–2015)
- NBA draft: 2015: undrafted
- Playing career: 2015–present

Career history
- 2015–2016: Austin Spurs
- 2016–2017: Anyang KGC
- 2017–2018: Ankara DSİ
- 2018–2019: Felice Scandone
- 2019: Guangzhou Loong Lions
- 2019–2020: Olimpia Milano
- 2020: Türk Telekom
- 2020: Panathinaikos
- 2020–2021: South East Melbourne Phoenix
- 2021: Fort Wayne Mad Ants
- 2021–2022: Indiana Pacers
- 2022–2023: Motor City Cruise
- 2023: Long Island Nets
- 2023–2024: Windy City Bulls
- 2024–2025: Openjobmetis Varese
- 2025: Legia Warsaw
- 2025–2026: Hubei Wenlv
- 2026: Guangzhou Loong Lions

Career highlights
- PLK champion (2025); KBL All-Star (2017); 2× Horizon League Player of the Year (2014, 2015); 3× First-team All-Horizon League (2013–2015); 2× AP Honorable mention All-American (2014, 2015)
- Stats at NBA.com
- Stats at Basketball Reference

Keifer Jerail Sykes (born December 30, 1993) is an American professional basketball player. He played college basketball for the University of Wisconsin–Green Bay. Sykes is featured in the 2018 documentary film Chi-Town, produced and directed by Nick Budabin, following his path from high school to his brush with the NBA.

== Early life ==
Sykes, a 5 ft 11 in (1.80 m) point guard, was born in Chicago, Illinois, to the late James Sykes as the second oldest of seven children. He starred at John Marshall Metropolitan High School in Chicago, where he was named second team All-Chicago Public High School League by the Chicago Sun-Times.

== College career ==
After graduating high school, Sykes committed to play college basketball for coach Brian Wardle and eventually alongside Marshall teammates Alfonzo McKinnie and Vincent Garret, at Green Bay.

From his freshman year in 2011–12, Sykes was immediately inserted into the Phoenix starting lineup, and was also the youngest player in the nation, let alone youngest starter. He averaged 11.2 points and 3.3 assists per game. At the end of the season, Sykes was named to the Horizon League All-Newcomer team.

As a sophomore, Sykes increased his production to 15.9 points and 4.3 assists per game and led the Phoenix to the 2013 CollegeInsider.com Postseason Tournament. He was named first team All-Horizon League.

At the start of the 2013–14 season, Sykes was named to the preseason All-Horizon League team and was a nominee for the Bob Cousy Award for top point guard in the country. Sykes and 7 ft 1 in (2.16 m) standout player Alec Brown led the Phoenix to a 24–5 regular season record and finished first in the Horizon League. The season included an upset over eventual Atlantic Coast Conference regular season champion (and NCAA tournament 1-seed) Virginia in a game which saw Sykes score 21 points and distribute 10 assists. In a 69–66 loss to Wisconsin, Sykes scored 32 points, including a highlight dunk in the first possession of the game. At the conclusion of the regular season, Sykes was again named first team all-conference, he was named an honorable mention AP All-American, and was named Horizon Player of the Year. A loss in the Horizon League tournament, due in part to a Sykes injury, led the Phoenix to missing an automatic bid into the NCAA tournament and playing in the National Invitation Tournament.

For his senior season, Sykes had high expectations as he was placed on the Bob Cousy Award Watch List (later becoming a Cousy Award Finalist), the Wooden Award Watch List, and the Naismith Award Watch List during the preseason. On February 26, 2015, playing in his hometown of Chicago, Sykes scored a career-high 36 points against UIC to surpass the 2,000-point mark for his career. Sykes became the only active player in the nation with 2,000+ points, 500+ assists, and 400+ rebounds. He also became the only player in Horizon League history to record those same career totals. Sykes won the 2015 Horizon League player of the year to join the elite company of players to win the award twice. For the second time in his career, he was named to the Honorable Mention AP All-American team. For the week of January 4–10, 2015, Sykes won the Naismith National Player of the Week Award. In that week, Sykes averaged 28.7 points, five rebounds, and four assists per game while shooting 53.6% from the field, 50% from three, and leading the Phoenix to a 3–0 record. Sykes set a conference record as he was named the Horizon League player of the week thirteen times over his career. Sykes was one of eight invitees to compete in the Slam Dunk Contest at the 2015 Final Four, where he placed second.

== Professional career ==
=== Austin Spurs (2015–2016) ===
After going undrafted in the 2015 NBA draft, Sykes joined the Cleveland Cavaliers for the 2015 NBA Summer League. On September 28, 2015, he signed with the San Antonio Spurs, only to be waived by the team on October 21 after appearing in three preseason games. Nine days later, he was acquired by the Austin Spurs of the NBA Development League as an affiliate player of San Antonio.

On November 13, Sykes made his professional debut in a 104–82 win over the Texas Legends, recording eight points, one rebound, six assists and three steals in 17 minutes off the bench. In his rookie season with Austin, including the playoffs, Sykes averaged 13.1 points, 3.3 assists, 3.6 rebounds, and 0.84 steals while shooting 45.9% from the field and 77.4% from the free throw line, and also recording a plus/minus of +196. Sykes elevated his play in the postseason, including a game in which he recorded 31 points and 6 steals in a 26-point comeback in a win-or-go-home game 3. Due to his success, he was invited to the 2016 NBA D-League Elite Camp.

=== Anyang Korea Ginseng Corporation (2016–2017) ===
In the summer of 2016, Sykes joined the Golden State Warriors in the 2016 NBA Summer League. On July 21, 2016, he was selected by Anyang KGC in the second round of the 2016 KBL draft.

=== Ankara DSİ (2017–2018) ===
In the 2017–18 season, Sykes played for Ankara DSİ S.K. in the Turkish TBL, posting 22.4 points, 3.7 rebounds and 4.8 assists per game.

=== Scandone Avellino (2018–2019) ===
Sykes signed with Scandone Avellino of the Italian Lega Basket Serie A on August 7, 2018.

Sykes is featured in the 2018 documentary film Chi-Town, produced and directed by Nick Budabin. The film follows Sykes' path from high school to his brush with the NBA.

=== Guangzhou Loong Lions (2019) ===
On August 3, 2019, Sykes signed with the Guangzhou Loong Lions of the Chinese Basketball Association.

=== Olimpia Milano (2019–2020) ===
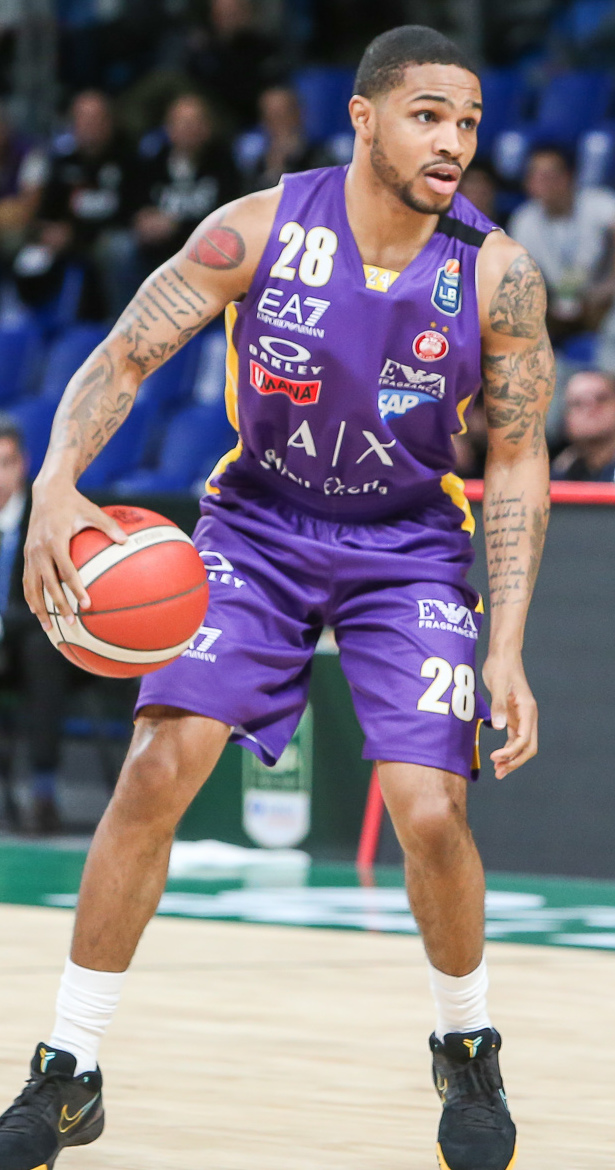
Sykes with Olimpia Milano in 2020

On December 27, 2019, Sykes signed with the Olimpia Milano until the end of the season.

=== Türk Telekom (2020) ===
On September 13, 2020, Sykes signed with Türk Telekom B.K. of the Basketball Super League.

=== Panathinaikos (2020) ===
On October 4, 2020, Sykes signed a 1-month contract with Panathinaikos of the Greek Basket League. The team later tried to sign Sykes to a contract for another month, but Sykes balked, wanting an agreement through the end of the year, and was let go by Panathinaikos at the end of October.

=== South East Melbourne Phoenix (2020–2021) ===
On December 8, 2020, Sykes signed a one-year contract with the South East Melbourne Phoenix of the Australian National Basketball League (NBL). On February 21, 2021, he recorded a triple-double with 14 points, 10 rebounds and 11 assists in a 99–83 win over the Brisbane Bullets.

=== Fort Wayne Mad Ants (2021) ===
On August 5, 2021, Sykes signed a contract with the Indiana Pacers of the National Basketball Association (NBA). He was waived at the end of training camp. Sykes subsequently joined the Fort Wayne Mad Ants and averaged 16.3 points, 8 assists and 4.3 rebounds per game.

=== Indiana Pacers (2021–2022) ===
On December 27, 2021, Sykes signed with the Indiana Pacers for the remainder of the season. He was waived on April 7, 2022.

=== Motor City Cruise (2022–2023) ===
On November 3, 2022, Sykes was named to the opening night roster for the Motor City Cruise.

=== Long Island Nets (2023) ===
On September 18, 2023, Sykes' rights were traded to the Long Island Nets and two days later, was signed by the Brooklyn Nets. However, they waived him on September 25 and on October 28, he joined Long Island.

=== Windy City Bulls (2023–2024) ===
On December 15, 2023, Sykes was traded to the Windy City Bulls.

=== Openjobmetis Varese (2024–2025) ===
On November 19, 2024, Sykes signed with Openjobmetis Varese of the Lega Basket Serie A.

=== Legia Warsaw (2025) ===
On March 7, 2025, he signed with Legia Warsaw of the Polish Basketball League (PLK).

== Career statistics ==
Legend
GP	Games played	GS	Games started	MPG	Minutes per game
FG%	Field goal percentage	3P%	3-point field goal percentage	FT%	Free throw percentage
RPG	Rebounds per game	APG	Assists per game	SPG	Steals per game
BPG	Blocks per game	PPG	Points per game	**Bold**	Career high

=== NBA ===
Year	Team	GP	GS	MPG	FG%	3P%	FT%	RPG	APG	SPG	BPG	PPG
2021–22	Indiana	32	11	17.7	.363	.300	.882	1.4	1.9	.4	.1	5.6
Career		32	11	17.7	.363	.300	.882	1.4	1.9	.4	.1	5.6
