= 2020 NBL pre-season =

Pre-season basketball

The pre-season of the 2020–21 NBL season, the 43rd season of Australia's National Basketball League, started on 13 November 2020 and concluded on 9 January 2021.

== Games ==
=== Adelaide 36ers pre-season ===
13 November 2020	Adelaide 36ers	93–75	Brisbane Bullets	Adelaide Entertainment Centre, Adelaide
19:00	Scoring by quarter: 26–15, 15–20, 27–19, 25–21
NBL TV	Pts: Johnson 20; Rebs: Giddey 8 Asts: Giddey 6	boxscore broadcast report	Pts: Drmic 17; Rebs: Harrison 9 Asts: Kendle 5	Attendance: 3,556; Referees: Michael Aylen, Nathan Durant, Daniel Troy

15 November 2020	Adelaide 36ers	87–62	Brisbane Bullets	Titanium Security Arena, Adelaide
13:30	Scoring by quarter: 29–16, 21–15, 23–16, 14–15
NBL TV	Pts: Johnson 19; Rebs: Humphries 12; Asts: Giddey 7	boxscore broadcast report	Pts: Sobey 14; Rebs: Froling 9 Asts: Sobey 4	Attendance: 200; Referees: Michael Aylen, Nathan Durant, Daniel Troy

=== Brisbane Bullets pre-season ===
18 December 2020	Brisbane Bullets	108–98	South East Melbourne Phoenix	Gold Coast Sports and Leisure Centre, Gold Coast
19:00	Scoring by quarter: 30–25, 27–16, 28–30, 23–17
NBL TV	Pts: Drmic 21; Rebs: Hodgson 10; Asts: Cadee, Sobey 7	boxscore broadcast report	Pts: Creek 31; Rebs: Creek 7 Asts: Creek 4	Attendance: 1,120; Referees: Vaughan Mayberry, Marc Mills, Alex McEwan

20 December 2020	Brisbane Bullets	102–100	South East Melbourne Phoenix	Gold Coast Sports and Leisure Centre, Gold Coast
12:00	Scoring by quarter: 36–34, 22–20, 14–23, 30–23
NBL TV	Pts: Froling 30; Rebs: Froling, Hodgson 9 Asts: Cadee 8	boxscore broadcast report	Pts: Creek 29; Rebs: Creek 10; Asts: Adnam 6	Referees: Vaughan Mayberry, Marc Mills, Alex McEwan

=== Cairns Taipans pre-season ===
31 December 2020	Cairns Taipans	81–97	Melbourne United	Cairns Pop-Up Arena, Cairns
18:00	Scoring by quarter: 24–18, 13–22, 20–31, 24–26
NBL TV	Pts: King 21; Rebs: Krslovic 7 Asts: Machado 6	boxscore broadcast report	Pts: Goulding 17; Rebs: Landale 8 Asts: McCarron 5	Referees: Vaughan Mayberry, Alex McEwan, Jacqui Dover

9 January 2021	Cairns Taipans	96–88	Adelaide 36ers	Cairns Pop-Up Arena, Cairns
18:00	Scoring by quarter: 26–22, 15–18, 27–26, 28–22
NBL TV	Pts: Noi 22; Rebs: Oliver 11; Asts: Machado 8	boxscore broadcast report	Pts: Sloan 24; Rebs: Johnson 10; Asts: Dillon 3	Attendance: 1,000; Referees: Marc Mill, Alex McEwan, Jacqui Dover

=== Perth Wildcats pre-season ===
15 December 2020	Perth Wildcats	91–83	The Hawks	RAC Arena, Perth
18:30	Scoring by quarter: 18–19, 24–23, 22–22, 27–19
NBL TV	Pts: Cotton 25; Rebs: Mooney 7 Asts: Norton 4	boxscore broadcast report	Pts: Jessup 24; Rebs: Deng 7 Asts: Adel, Naar, Harvey, Jessup 2	Referees: Nico Fernandes, Craig Copes, Mark Grist

17 December 2020	Perth Wildcats	74–82	The Hawks	Bendat Basketball Centre, Perth
18:30	Scoring by quarter: 25–21, 16–21, 16–22, 17–18
NBL TV	Pts: Mooney 19; Rebs: Mooney 13; Asts: Norton 5	boxscore broadcast report	Pts: Harvey 18; Rebs: Ogilvy 7 Asts: Naar 5	Referees: Nico Fernandes, Craig Copes, Mark Grist

=== Sydney Kings pre-season ===
20 December 2020	Sydney Kings	98–89	The Hawks	Qudos Bank Arena, Sydney
17:00	Scoring by quarter: 22–13, 26–29, 29–17, 21–30
NBL TV	Pts: Bruce 14; Rebs: Moller 8 Asts: Ware 4	boxscore broadcast report	Pts: Jessup 21; Rebs: Deng 9 Asts: Harvey 4	Attendance: closed event Referees: Haylee Cole, Logan Bilby, Simon Cosier

== Pre-season ladder ==
2020–21 NBL pre-season ladder
Ladder
Information

Pos.	Nat.	Name	Pld.	W.	L.	Last 5	Streak	Home	Away	For	Against	Pts %	Win %
1	(Australia)	Melbourne	1	1	0	1–0	W1	0–0	1–0	97	81	119.75%	100.00%
2	(Australia)	Sydney	1	1	0	1–0	W1	1–0	0–0	98	89	110.11%	100.00%
3	(Australia)	Adelaide	3	2	1	2–1	L1	2–0	0–1	276	225	122.67%	66.67%
4	(Australia)	Perth (RC)	2	1	1	1–1	L1	1–1	0–0	165	165	100.00%	50.00%
5	(Australia)	Cairns	2	1	1	1–1	W1	1–1	0–0	177	185	95.68%	50.00%
6	(Australia)	Brisbane	4	2	2	2–2	W2	2–0	0–2	347	378	91.80%	50.00%
7	(Australia)	Illawarra	3	1	2	1–2	L1	0–0	1–2	254	263	96.58%	33.33%
8	(Australia)	S.E. Melbourne	2	0	2	0–2	L2	0–0	0–2	198	210	94.29%	0.00%

Total Rounds
5 weeks

Total Games
11 games

Legend
- (RC) Reigning Champion

- Updated: 9 January 2021
