= 2020–21 New Zealand Breakers season =

- Head coach: (Israel) Dan Shamir
- Captain: (New Zealand) Thomas Abercrombie
- Arena: Spark Arena

NBL results
- Record: 12–24 (33.3%)
- Ladder: 8th
- Finals finish: Did not qualify
- Stats at NBL.com.au

Cup results
- Record: 3–5 (37.5%)
- Ladder: 7th
- Cup finish: N/A

The 2020–21 NBL season was the 18th season for the New Zealand Breakers in the NBL.

== Roster ==
Note: Flags indicate national team eligibility at FIBA-sanctioned events. Players may hold other non-FIBA nationalities not displayed.

2020–21 New Zealand Breakers roster
Players
Coaches

Pos.	No.	Nat.	Name	Ht.	Wt.	Age
G	0	(New Zealand)	Webster, Tai	1.93 m (6 ft 4 in)	89 kg (196 lb)	31 – 29 May 1995
G	1	(New Zealand)	Murray, Taine (DP)	1.96 m (6 ft 5 in)	89 kg (196 lb)	24 – 19 April 2002
F	3	(New Zealand)	Delany, Finn	1.98 m (6 ft 6 in)	102 kg (225 lb)	31 – 12 August 1995
C	4	(United States)	Iverson, Colton (I)	2.13 m (7 ft 0 in)	116 kg (256 lb)	37 – 29 June 1989
F	6	(Australia)	Galloway, Kyrin (DP)	2.03 m (6 ft 8 in)	97 kg (214 lb)	26 – 7 October 1999
G	7	(Australia)	McDowell-White, Will	1.96 m (6 ft 5 in)	84 kg (185 lb)	28 – 13 April 1998
G	9	(New Zealand)	Webster, Corey	1.88 m (6 ft 2 in)	86 kg (190 lb)	37 – 29 November 1988
G/F	10	(New Zealand)	Abercrombie, Thomas (C)	1.98 m (6 ft 6 in)	90 kg (198 lb)	39 – 5 July 1987
F	12	(New Zealand)	Davidson, Isaac (DP)	2.01 m (6 ft 7 in)	100 kg (220 lb)	29 – 22 June 1997
F/C	15	(New Zealand)	Loe, Robert	2.11 m (6 ft 11 in)	111 kg (245 lb)	35 – 5 August 1991
G	18	(Denmark)	Bach, Rasmus	1.93 m (6 ft 4 in)	84 kg (185 lb)	31 – 22 July 1995
G/F	20	(United States)	Randolph, Levi (I)	1.98 m (6 ft 6 in)	95 kg (209 lb)	33 – 3 October 1992
F	25	(Australia)	Trist, Daniel	2.06 m (6 ft 9 in)	104 kg (229 lb)	34 – 29 August 1992

Head coach

- (Israel) Dan Shamir

Assistant coach(es)

- (Israel) Mody Maor
- (New Zealand) Chanel Pompallier
- (United States) Rashid Al-Kaleem

Strength & conditioning coach(es)

- (New Zealand) Emily Nolan

Legend

- (C) Team captain
- (DP) Development player
- (IN) Inactive
- (I) Import player
- (TP) Training player
- (NS) Next Star player
- Injured

- Roster
Updated: 1 May 2021

== Regular season ==
=== Ladder ===
Pos	2020–21 NBL season											
Pos	Team	Pld	W	L	PCT	Last 5	Streak	Home	Away	PF	PA	PP
1	Melbourne United	36	28	8	77.78%	4–1	W3	14–4	14–4	3189	2956	107.88%
2	Perth Wildcats	36	25	11	69.44%	3–2	L2	13–5	12–6	3133	2900	108.03%
3	Illawarra Hawks	36	20	16	55.56%	4–1	L1	11–7	9–9	2962	2954	100.27%
4	S.E. Melbourne Phoenix	36	19	17	52.78%	2–3	L1	9–9	10–8	3217	3124	102.98%
5	Sydney Kings	36	19	17	52.78%	4–1	W3	11–7	8–10	3112	3087	100.81%
6	Brisbane Bullets	36	18	18	50.00%	4–1	W1	9–9	9–9	3204	3274	97.86%
7	Adelaide 36ers	36	13	23	36.11%	0–5	L7	10–8	3–15	2985	3156	94.58%
8	New Zealand Breakers	36	12	24	33.33%	2–3	L1	8–10	4–14	2937	3021	97.22%
9	Cairns Taipans	36	8	28	22.22%	1–4	L2	6–12	2–16	2940	3207	91.67%

Updated to match(es) played on 9 June 2021. Source: NBL.com.au

=== Ladder progression ===
- Numbers highlighted in green indicate that the team finished the round inside the top four.
- Numbers highlighted in blue indicates the team finished first on the ladder in that round.
- Numbers highlighted in red indicates the team finished last place on the ladder in that round.

2020–21 NBL season
Team	1	2	3	4	5	NBL Cup				10	11	12	13	14	15	16	17	18	19	20	21
Team	1	2	3	4	5	6	7	8	9	10	11	12	13	14	15	16	17	18	19	20	21
Adelaide 36ers	3	5	3	3	3	4	6	5	7	7	7	7	7	7	7	7	7	7	7	7	7
Brisbane Bullets	6	9	5	6	6	7	5	4	5	5	6	6	5	6	6	6	6	6	6	6	6
Cairns Taipans	4	7	8	8	8	8	9	9	9	9	9	9	9	9	9	9	9	9	9	9	9
Illawarra Hawks	2	3	1	2	2	2	4	3	3	4	3	5	4	5	5	5	5	4	4	3	3
Melbourne United	1	1	2	1	1	1	1	1	1	2	2	2	1	1	1	1	1	1	1	1	1
New Zealand Breakers	–	8	9	9	9	9	8	8	8	8	8	8	8	8	8	8	8	8	8	8	8
Perth Wildcats	–	2	4	7	7	3	2	2	2	1	1	1	2	2	2	2	2	2	2	2	2
S.E. Melbourne Phoenix	7	6	6	4	4	5	3	7	4	3	4	3	3	3	4	4	4	3	3	4	4
Sydney Kings	5	4	7	5	5	6	7	6	6	6	5	4	6	4	3	3	3	5	5	5	5

=== Game log ===
2020–21 game log
Total: 12–24 (Home: 8–10; Road: 4–14)
January: 1–2 (home: 0–0; road: 1–2)

Game	Date	Team	Score	High points	High rebounds	High assists	Location Attendance	Record
1	22 January	@ Adelaide	L 94–91 (OT)	Tai Webster (34)	Finn Delany (8)	Tai Webster (8)	Adelaide Entertainment Centre; 6,589	0–1
2	27 January	@ Adelaide	L 88–78	Finn Delany (19)	Colton Iverson (10)	Tai Webster (7)	Adelaide Entertainment Centre; 5,706	0–2

February : 1–2 (home: 0–0; road: 1–2)

Game	Date	Team	Score	High points	High rebounds	High assists	Location Attendance	Record
3	6 February	@ Cairns	W 79–85	Tai Webster (25)	Tai Webster (11)	Tai Webster (5)	Cairns Pop-Up Arena; 1,891	1–2
4	8 February	@ Cairns	L 84–69	Tai Webster (13)	Thomas Abercrombie (7)	Lamar Patterson (4)	Cairns Pop-Up Arena; 1,828	1–3
5	12 February	@ Sydney	L 84–74	Corey Webster (25)	Iverson, T. Webster (10)	Tai Webster (4)	Qudos Bank Arena; 5,833	1–4

NBL Cup: 3–5 (home: 2–2; road: 1–3)

Game	Date	Team	Score	High points	High rebounds	High assists	Location Attendance	Record
6	22 February	@ Illawarra	L 102–88	Corey Webster (22)	Colton Iverson (17)	Corey Webster (7)	John Cain Arena; 2,313	1–5
7	25 February	@ Sydney	L 96–78	Corey Webster (24)	Colton Iverson (6)	Tai Webster (5)	John Cain Arena; 1,991	1–6
8	27 February	@ Adelaide	W 62–106	C. Webster, T. Webster (29)	Colton Iverson (8)	Tai Webster (11)	John Cain Arena; 4,206	2–6
9	3 March	Brisbane	W 97–92	Corey Webster (21)	Tai Webster (9)	C. Webster, T. Webster (4)	State Basketball Centre; 2,257	3–6
10	5 March	Melbourne	L 84–87	Tai Webster (32)	Finn Delany (9)	Delany, C. Webster, T. Webster, Weeks (2)	John Cain Arena; 3,421	3–7
11	10 March	Cairns	W 86–83	Thomas Abercrombie (20)	Colton Iverson (11)	Tai Webster (4)	John Cain Arena; 3,675	4–7
12	12 March	@ Perth	L 85–75	Finn Delany (30)	Colton Iverson (8)	Tai Webster (7)	John Cain Arena; 2,478	4–8
13	14 March	South East Melbourne	L 89–103	Finn Delany (24)	Colton Iverson (8)	Tai Webster (5)	John Cain Arena; 4,019	4–9

March: 1–2 (home: 0–1; road: 1–1)

Game	Date	Team	Score	High points	High rebounds	High assists	Location Attendance	Record
14	20 March	@ Brisbane	L 88–67	Tai Webster (19)	Finn Delany (9)	Tai Webster (5)	Nissan Arena; 3,386	4–10
15	25 March	Melbourne	L 79–82	Finn Delany (17)	Abercrombie, T. Webster (7)	Tai Webster (7)	Bendigo Stadium; 1,150	4–11
16	27 March	@ Brisbane	W 76–81 (OT)	Tai Webster (27)	Colton Iverson (20)	Tai Webster (10)	Nissan Arena; 2,935	5–11

April: 3–5 (home: 2–2; road: 1–3)

Game	Date	Team	Score	High points	High rebounds	High assists	Location Attendance	Record
17	4 April	@ South East Melbourne	L 92–85	Colton Iverson (26)	Colton Iverson (22)	Tai Webster (7)	John Cain Arena; 1,850	5–12
18	10 April	@ Melbourne	L 84–78	Finn Delany (33)	Colton Iverson (9)	William McDowell-White (4)	John Cain Arena; 2,717	5–13
19	13 April	Perth	L 79–85 (OT)	Finn Delany (25)	Finn Delany (9)	Corey Webster (8)	Silverdome; 1,358	5–14
20	16 April	Brisbane	W 91–71	Levi Randolph (20)	William McDowell-White (10)	William McDowell-White (14)	Silverdome; 1,559	6–14
21	18 April	@ Perth	W 78–83	Levi Randolph (23)	Colton Iverson (17)	Finn Delany (7)	RAC Arena; 11,316	7–14
22	23 April	Cairns	L 68–70	Finn Delany (23)	Finn Delany (14)	Corey Webster (7)	Silverdome; 1,287	7–15
23	26 April	Adelaide	W 93–77	Finn Delany (23)	Colton Iverson (9)	William McDowell-White (13)	Silverdome; 893	8–15
24	28 April	@ Melbourne	L 90–76	Corey Webster (20)	Finn Delany (9)	Corey Webster (5)	John Cain Arena; 2,173	8–16

May: 3–7 (home: 3–4; road: 0–3)

Game	Date	Team	Score	High points	High rebounds	High assists	Location Attendance	Record
25	1 May	Perth	W 86–84	Levi Randolph (19)	Colton Iverson (5)	Randolph, C. Webster, T. Webster (4)	Silverdome; 1,621	9–16
26	3 May	Illawarra	L 67–75	Abercrombie, T. Webster (14)	Finn Delany (9)	Tai Webster (5)	Silverdome; 1,097	9–17
27	9 May	@ Perth	L 98–84	Finn Delany (21)	Tai Webster (7)	William McDowell-White (7)	RAC Arena; 10,518	9–18
28	12 May	@ South East Melbourne	L 91–82	Finn Delany (32)	Colton Iverson (8)	McDowell-White, T. Webster (4)	John Cain Arena; 1,247	9–19
29	15 May	@ Illawarra	L 73–71	Finn Delany (20)	Finn Delany (11)	William McDowell-White (9)	WIN Entertainment Centre; 2,456	9–20
30	20 May	Sydney	W 89–81	Finn Delany (28)	Finn Delany (13)	William McDowell-White (7)	The Trusts Arena; 3,800	10–20
31	22 May	Sydney	L 76–81	Levi Randolph (25)	Iverson, T. Webster (7)	Tai Webster (5)	TSB Stadium; 2,066	10–21
32	25 May	Adelaide	W 94–76	Corey Webster (22)	Colton Iverson (7)	McDowell-White, C. Webster (8)	Christchurch Arena; 2,803	11–21
33	28 May	Illawarra	73–84	Finn Delany (24)	Iverson, Randolph (8)	William McDowell-White (5)	Franklin Pool and Leisure Centre; 1,100	11–22
34	30 May	Brisbane	L 83–95	Levi Randolph (30)	Colton Iverson (16)	Corey Webster (6)	Spark Arena; 7,612	11–23

June: 1–1 (home: 1–1; road: 0–0)

Game	Date	Team	Score	High points	High rebounds	High assists	Location Attendance	Record
35	2 June	Cairns	W 84–78	Tai Webster (23)	Colton Iverson (12)	Corey Webster (4)	Energy Events Centre; 2,435	12–23
36	5 June	South East Melbourne	L 78–83	Tai Webster (26)	Colton Iverson (12)	Finn Delany (4)	The Trusts Arena; 3,872	12–24

== Transactions ==
=== Re-signed ===
Player	Signed
Corey Webster	18 December
Finn Delany	16 February
Robert Loe	16 February
Jarrad Weeks	5 March

=== Additions ===
Player	Signed	Former team
Tai Webster	15 July	Galatasaray
Daniel Trist	15 July	South East Melbourne Phoenix
Kyrin Galloway	15 July	UNC Greensboro
Lamar Patterson	4 August	Brisbane Bullets
Taine Murray	13 August	Auckland Huskies
Colton Iverson	15 September	Zenit Saint Petersburg
Isaac Davidson	12 December	Franklin Bulls
Rasmus Bach	18 December	Randers Cimbria
Jeremy Kendle	13 March	Adelaide 36ers
William McDowell-White	13 March	Rio Grande Valley Vipers
Levi Randolph	16 March	Canton Charge

=== Subtractions ===
Player	Reason left	New team
Sek Henry	Free agent	Karşıyaka Basket
Jordan Ngatai	Free agent	Cairns Taipans
Deng Deng	Free agent	The Hawks
Ater Majok	Free agent	Al-Arabi
Scotty Hopson	Free agent	Melbourne United
Tom Vodanovich	Free agent	Sydney Kings
Brandon Ashley	Free agent	NBA G League Ignite
Lamar Patterson	Released	Brisbane Bullets
Jeremy Kendle	Released	Auckland Huskies
Jarrad Weeks	Released	Sydney Kings

== Awards ==
=== Player of the Week ===
Round 19, Finn Delany

== See also ==
- 2020–21 NBL season
- New Zealand Breakers
