= 2020–21 Adelaide 36ers season =

National Basketball League team season

- Head coach: (United States) Conner Henry
- Co-captains: (Australia) Daniel Dillon (Australia) Daniel Johnson (Australia) Brendan Teys
- Arena: Adelaide Entertainment Centre

NBL results
- Record: 13–23 (36.1%)
- Ladder: 7th
- Finals finish: Did not qualify
- Stats at NBL.com.au

Cup results
- Record: 2–6 (25%)
- Ladder: 8th
- Cup finish: N/A

The 2020–21 NBL season was the 40th season for the Adelaide 36ers in the NBL, and their first under new head coach Conner Henry.

== Squad ==
=== Signings ===
- The 36ers retained LeBron James, Obi Kyei, Brendan Teys, Daniel Dillon and Alex Mudronja who had all signed multiple season contracts that covered the 2020–21 season.
- On 26 February 2020, former head coach Joey Wright and the club parted ways despite still have time left on his contract. Following his departure there were accusations of abuse and bullying by Wright across their final season together.
- On 12 March 2020, the 36ers announced that they had signed Josh Giddey on a Next Stars program contract.
- On 15 April 2020, club co-captain Kevin White was released from his remaining contract.
- On 6 May 2020, Daniel Johnson signed a new three-year deal with the club.
- On 16 July 2020, the 36ers signed 2018 NBL Rookie of the Year Isaac Humphries on a two-year deal.
- On 17 July 2020, the 36ers announced that Keanu Pinder had signed a one-year deal.
- On 22 July 2020, former Hawk Sunday Dech joined the 36ers on a three-year deal.
- On 18 August 2020, Jamie Pearlman was announced as the lead assistant coach.
- On 20 August 2020, Donald Sloan signed a one-year contract with the 36ers, filling their first import slot.
- On 29 September 2020, Obi Kyei's request to be released from his contract was granted by the 36ers, releasing him from the final year of his contract.
- On 1 December 2020, Tony Crocker signed a one-year deal to complete the 36ers roster.
- On 7 January 2021, the 36ers signed Owen Hulland as a development player for the 2020–21 season.
- On 7 February 2021, the 36ers granted Donald Sloan a release from the remainder of his contract.
- On 10 February 2021, Jeremy Kendle was announced as the temporary replacement of former import Sloan.
- On 18 February 2021, Brandon Paul was announced as the long-term replacement to Sloan.
- On 2 March 2021, the 36ers announced that Humphries was injured and would be sidelined for four to six weeks. Jack Purchase was announced as his injury replacement player.
- On 12 March 2021, Kendle was released from his short term contract.
- On 17 March 2021, Josh Giddey was released from the active playing roster to prepare for the 2021 NBA draft. He averaged 10.9 points, 7.3 rebounds and a league-leading 7.6 assists per game in 28 games played.

=== Roster ===
Note: Flags indicate national team eligibility at FIBA-sanctioned events. Players may hold other non-FIBA nationalities not displayed.

2020–21 Adelaide 36ers roster
Players
Coaches

| Pos. | No. | Nat. | Name | Ht. | Wt. | Age |
|---|---|---|---|---|---|---|
| G/F | 2 | (United States) | Crocker, Tony (I) | 1.98 m (6 ft 6 in) | 98 kg (216 lb) | 39 – 17 January 1987 |
| G | 3 | (United States) | Paul, Brandon (I) | 1.93 m (6 ft 4 in) | 91 kg (201 lb) | 35 – 30 April 1991 |
| G | 6 | (Australia) | Giddey, Josh (NS & IN) | 2.00 m (6 ft 7 in) | 87 kg (192 lb) | 23 – 10 October 2002 |
| G | 7 | (Australia) | Teys, Brendan (C) | 1.92 m (6 ft 4 in) | 82 kg (181 lb) | 36 – 22 February 1990 |
| C | 8 | (Australia) | Humphries, Isaac | 2.11 m (6 ft 11 in) | 116 kg (256 lb) | 28 – 5 January 1998 |
| G | 9 | (Australia) | McVeigh, Jack | 2.03 m (6 ft 8 in) | 95 kg (209 lb) | 30 – 27 June 1996 |
| G | 10 | (Australia) | Mudronja, Alex | 1.96 m (6 ft 5 in) | 88 kg (194 lb) | 27 – 3 September 1999 |
| F | 11 | (Australia) | Purchase, Jack | 2.06 m (6 ft 9 in) | 95 kg (209 lb) | 31 – 26 June 1995 |
| G | 12 | (Australia) | Dillon, Daniel (C) | 1.93 m (6 ft 4 in) | 91 kg (201 lb) | 40 – 19 March 1986 |
| C | 21 | (Australia) | Johnson, Daniel (C) | 2.12 m (6 ft 11 in) | 108 kg (238 lb) | 38 – 3 April 1988 |
| F | 25 | (Australia) | Pinder, Keanu | 2.05 m (6 ft 9 in) | 100 kg (220 lb) | 31 – 28 May 1995 |
| F | 32 | (Australia) | Hulland, Owen (DP) | 2.12 m (6 ft 11 in) | 108 kg (238 lb) | 26 – 4 October 1999 |
| G | 44 | (South Sudan) | Dech, Sunday | 1.95 m (6 ft 5 in) | 93 kg (205 lb) | 32 – 1 January 1994 |

Head coach

- (United States) Conner Henry

Assistant coach(es)

- (Australia) Jamie Pearlman

Legend

- (C) Team captain
- (DP) Development player
- (IN) Inactive
- (I) Import player
- (TP) Training player
- (NS) Next Star player
- Injured

- Roster
Updated: 18 May 2021

== Pre-season ==
To start their first season under their new head coach, the 36ers hosted 2 practice matches against the Brisbane Bullets.

=== Ladder ===
2020–21 NBL pre-season ladder
Ladder
Information

| Pos. | Nat. | Name | Pld. | W. | L. | Last 5 | Streak | Home | Away | For | Against | Pts % | Win % |
|---|---|---|---|---|---|---|---|---|---|---|---|---|---|
| 1 | (Australia) | Melbourne | 1 | 1 | 0 | 1–0 | W1 | 0–0 | 1–0 | 97 | 81 | 119.75% | 100.00% |
| 2 | (Australia) | Sydney | 1 | 1 | 0 | 1–0 | W1 | 1–0 | 0–0 | 98 | 89 | 110.11% | 100.00% |
| 3 | (Australia) | Adelaide | 3 | 2 | 1 | 2–1 | L1 | 2–0 | 0–1 | 276 | 225 | 122.67% | 66.67% |
| 4 | (Australia) | Perth (RC) | 2 | 1 | 1 | 1–1 | L1 | 1–1 | 0–0 | 165 | 165 | 100.00% | 50.00% |
| 5 | (Australia) | Cairns | 2 | 1 | 1 | 1–1 | W1 | 1–1 | 0–0 | 177 | 185 | 95.68% | 50.00% |
| 6 | (Australia) | Brisbane | 4 | 2 | 2 | 2–2 | W2 | 2–0 | 0–2 | 347 | 378 | 91.80% | 50.00% |
| 7 | (Australia) | Illawarra | 3 | 1 | 2 | 1–2 | L1 | 0–0 | 1–2 | 254 | 263 | 96.58% | 33.33% |
| 8 | (Australia) | S.E. Melbourne | 2 | 0 | 2 | 0–2 | L2 | 0–0 | 0–2 | 198 | 210 | 94.29% | 0.00% |

Total Rounds
5 weeks

Total Games
11 games

Legend
- (RC) Reigning Champion

- Updated: 9 January 2021

=== Game log ===
2020 pre-season game log
Total: 2–1 (Home: 2–0; Road: 0–1)
November: 2–0 (home: 2–0; road: 0–0)

| Game | Date | Team | Score | High points | High rebounds | High assists | Location Attendance | Record |
|---|---|---|---|---|---|---|---|---|
| 1 | 13 November | Brisbane | W 93–75 | Daniel Johnson (20) | Josh Giddey (8) | Josh Giddey (6) | Adelaide Entertainment Centre; 4,516 | 1–0 |
| 2 | 15 November | Brisbane | W 87–62 | Daniel Johnson (19) | Isaac Humphries (12) | Josh Giddey (7) | Titanium Security Arena; 200 | 2–0 |

January : 0–1 (home: 0–0; road: 0–1)

| Game | Date | Team | Score | High points | High rebounds | High assists | Location Attendance | Record |
|---|---|---|---|---|---|---|---|---|
| 3 | 9 January | @ Cairns | L 96–88 | Donald Sloan (24) | Daniel Johnson (10) | Daniel Dillon (3) | Cairns Pop-Up Arena; 1,000 | 2–1 |

== Regular season ==
=== Ladder ===
| Pos | 2020–21 NBL season | | | | | | | | | | | |
| Pos | Team | Pld | W | L | PCT | Last 5 | Streak | Home | Away | PF | PA | PP |
|---|---|---|---|---|---|---|---|---|---|---|---|---|
| 1 | Melbourne United | 36 | 28 | 8 | 77.78% | 4–1 | W3 | 14–4 | 14–4 | 3189 | 2956 | 107.88% |
| 2 | Perth Wildcats | 36 | 25 | 11 | 69.44% | 3–2 | L2 | 13–5 | 12–6 | 3133 | 2900 | 108.03% |
| 3 | Illawarra Hawks | 36 | 20 | 16 | 55.56% | 4–1 | L1 | 11–7 | 9–9 | 2962 | 2954 | 100.27% |
| 4 | S.E. Melbourne Phoenix | 36 | 19 | 17 | 52.78% | 2–3 | L1 | 9–9 | 10–8 | 3217 | 3124 | 102.98% |
| 5 | Sydney Kings | 36 | 19 | 17 | 52.78% | 4–1 | W3 | 11–7 | 8–10 | 3112 | 3087 | 100.81% |
| 6 | Brisbane Bullets | 36 | 18 | 18 | 50.00% | 4–1 | W1 | 9–9 | 9–9 | 3204 | 3274 | 97.86% |
| 7 | Adelaide 36ers | 36 | 13 | 23 | 36.11% | 0–5 | L7 | 10–8 | 3–15 | 2985 | 3156 | 94.58% |
| 8 | New Zealand Breakers | 36 | 12 | 24 | 33.33% | 2–3 | L1 | 8–10 | 4–14 | 2937 | 3021 | 97.22% |
| 9 | Cairns Taipans | 36 | 8 | 28 | 22.22% | 1–4 | L2 | 6–12 | 2–16 | 2940 | 3207 | 91.67% |

Updated to match(es) played on 9 June 2021. Source: NBL.com.au

=== Ladder progression ===
- Numbers highlighted in green indicate that the team finished the round inside the top four.
- Numbers highlighted in blue indicates the team finished first on the ladder in that round.
- Numbers highlighted in red indicates the team finished last place on the ladder in that round.

2020–21 NBL season
| Team | 1 | 2 | 3 | 4 | 5 | NBL Cup | | | | 10 | 11 | 12 | 13 | 14 | 15 | 16 | 17 | 18 | 19 | 20 | 21 |
| Team | 1 | 2 | 3 | 4 | 5 | 6 | 7 | 8 | 9 | 10 | 11 | 12 | 13 | 14 | 15 | 16 | 17 | 18 | 19 | 20 | 21 |
|---|---|---|---|---|---|---|---|---|---|---|---|---|---|---|---|---|---|---|---|---|---|
| Adelaide 36ers | 3 | 5 | 3 | 3 | 3 | 4 | 6 | 5 | 7 | 7 | 7 | 7 | 7 | 7 | 7 | 7 | 7 | 7 | 7 | 7 | 7 |
| Brisbane Bullets | 6 | 9 | 5 | 6 | 6 | 7 | 5 | 4 | 5 | 5 | 6 | 6 | 5 | 6 | 6 | 6 | 6 | 6 | 6 | 6 | 6 |
| Cairns Taipans | 4 | 7 | 8 | 8 | 8 | 8 | 9 | 9 | 9 | 9 | 9 | 9 | 9 | 9 | 9 | 9 | 9 | 9 | 9 | 9 | 9 |
| Illawarra Hawks | 2 | 3 | 1 | 2 | 2 | 2 | 4 | 3 | 3 | 4 | 3 | 5 | 4 | 5 | 5 | 5 | 5 | 4 | 4 | 3 | 3 |
| Melbourne United | 1 | 1 | 2 | 1 | 1 | 1 | 1 | 1 | 1 | 2 | 2 | 2 | 1 | 1 | 1 | 1 | 1 | 1 | 1 | 1 | 1 |
| New Zealand Breakers | – | 8 | 9 | 9 | 9 | 9 | 8 | 8 | 8 | 8 | 8 | 8 | 8 | 8 | 8 | 8 | 8 | 8 | 8 | 8 | 8 |
| Perth Wildcats | – | 2 | 4 | 7 | 7 | 3 | 2 | 2 | 2 | 1 | 1 | 1 | 2 | 2 | 2 | 2 | 2 | 2 | 2 | 2 | 2 |
| S.E. Melbourne Phoenix | 7 | 6 | 6 | 4 | 4 | 5 | 3 | 7 | 4 | 3 | 4 | 3 | 3 | 3 | 4 | 4 | 4 | 3 | 3 | 4 | 4 |
| Sydney Kings | 5 | 4 | 7 | 5 | 5 | 6 | 7 | 6 | 6 | 6 | 5 | 4 | 6 | 4 | 3 | 3 | 3 | 5 | 5 | 5 | 5 |

=== Game log ===
2020–21 game log
Total: 13–23 (Home: 10–8; Road: 3–15)
January: 4–2 (home: 4–2; road: 0–0)

| Game | Date | Team | Score | High points | High rebounds | High assists | Location Attendance | Record |
|---|---|---|---|---|---|---|---|---|
| 1 | 15 January | Melbourne | L 65–89 | Daniel Johnson (29) | Dech, Giddey, Johnson, Pinder (6) | Josh Giddey (5) | Adelaide Entertainment Centre; 6,539 | 0–1 |
| 2 | 17 January | South East Melbourne | W 116–108 (2OT) | Daniel Johnson (33) | Isaac Humphries (12) | Josh Giddey (7) | Adelaide Entertainment Centre; 6,518 | 1–1 |
| 3 | 20 January | South East Melbourne | L 83–89 | Isaac Humphries (20) | Daniel Johnson (10) | Daniel Johnson (4) | Adelaide Entertainment Centre; 6,946 | 1–2 |
| 4 | 22 January | New Zealand | W 94–91 (OT) | Isaac Humphries (24) | Isaac Humphries (11) | Daniel Johnson (4) | Adelaide Entertainment Centre; 6,589 | 2–2 |
| 5 | 27 January | New Zealand | W 88–78 | Isaac Humphries (21) | Josh Giddey (10) | Josh Giddey (8) | Adelaide Entertainment Centre; 5,706 | 3–2 |
| 6 | 30 January | Sydney | W 85–80 | Isaac Humphries (27) | Isaac Humphries (9) | Giddey, Johnson, Sloan (4) | Adelaide Entertainment Centre; 7,087 | 4–2 |

February: 1–2 (home: 0–2; road: 1–0)

| Game | Date | Team | Score | High points | High rebounds | High assists | Location Attendance | Record |
|---|---|---|---|---|---|---|---|---|
| 7 | 6 February | Sydney | L 75–94 | Daniel Johnson (21) | Isaac Humphries (8) | Josh Giddey (4) | Adelaide Entertainment Centre; 7,317 | 4–3 |
| 8 | 13 February | @ Brisbane | W 70–85 | Isaac Humphries (24) | Isaac Humphries (13) | Josh Giddey (7) | Nissan Arena; 4,240 | 5–3 |
| 9 | 15 February | Brisbane | L 74–93 | Daniel Johnson (20) | Humphries, Johnson (8) | Josh Giddey (8) | Adelaide Entertainment Centre; 5,183 | 5–4 |

NBL Cup: 2–6 (home: 2–2; road: 0–4)

| Game | Date | Team | Score | High points | High rebounds | High assists | Location Attendance | Record |
|---|---|---|---|---|---|---|---|---|
| 10 | 21 February | @ Sydney | L 94–77 | Tony Crocker (15) | Josh Giddey (7) | Josh Giddey (7) | John Cain Arena; 2,566 | 5–5 |
| 11 | 23 February | South East Melbourne | W 99–94 | Daniel Johnson (27) | Isaac Humphries (11) | Josh Giddey (9) | John Cain Arena; 1,079 | 6–5 |
| 12 | 25 February | Melbourne | L 73–82 | Daniel Johnson (14) | Giddey, Humphries, Johnson (8) | Sunday Dech (4) | John Cain Arena; 1,991 | 6–6 |
| 13 | 27 February | New Zealand | L 62–106 | Jack McVeigh (20) | Daniel Johnson (8) | Daniel Johnson (4) | John Cain Arena; 4,206 | 6–7 |
| 14 | 4 March | @ Illawarra | L 98–89 | Tony Crocker (23) | Daniel Johnson (8) | Josh Giddey (9) | State Basketball Centre; 1,355 | 6–8 |
| 15 | 6 March | Cairns | W 81–71 | Daniel Johnson (30) | Daniel Johnson (9) | Josh Giddey (8) | John Cain Arena; 3,708 | 7–8 |
| 16 | 11 March | @ Brisbane | L 109–104 | Daniel Johnson (29) | Daniel Johnson (9) | Josh Giddey (11) | John Cain Arena; 997 | 7–9 |
| 17 | 14 March | @ Perth | L 97–88 | Brandon Paul (25) | Josh Giddey (8) | Josh Giddey (13) | John Cain Arena; 4,019 | 7–10 |

March: 0–3 (home: 0–0; road: 0–3)

| Game | Date | Team | Score | High points | High rebounds | High assists | Location Attendance | Record |
|---|---|---|---|---|---|---|---|---|
| 18 | 20 March | @ South East Melbourne | L 96–89 (OT) | Brandon Paul (29) | Josh Giddey (10) | Josh Giddey (7) | John Cain Arena; 1,682 | 7–11 |
| 19 | 22 March | @ Perth | L 92–82 | Daniel Johnson (19) | Daniel Johnson (8) | Brandon Paul (5) | RAC Arena; 9,550 | 7–12 |
| 20 | 28 March | @ Cairns | L 79–65 | Daniel Johnson (21) | Daniel Johnson (8) | Sunday Dech (5) | Cairns Pop-Up Arena; 1,945 | 7–13 |

April: 3–3 (home: 2–0; road: 1–3)

| Game | Date | Team | Score | High points | High rebounds | High assists | Location Attendance | Record |
|---|---|---|---|---|---|---|---|---|
| 21 | 3 April | Illawarra | W 84–72 | Daniel Johnson (26) | Daniel Johnson (15) | Josh Giddey (8) | Adelaide Entertainment Centre; 5,686 | 8–13 |
| 22 | 10 April | Perth | W 83–68 | Daniel Johnson (28) | Sunday Dech (10) | Josh Giddey (12) | Adelaide Entertainment Centre; 6,339 | 9–13 |
| 23 | 14 April | @ Cairns | L 91–88 | Daniel Johnson (24) | Josh Giddey (7) | Josh Giddey (9) | Cairns Pop-Up Arena; 1,869 | 9–14 |
| 24 | 17 April | @ South East Melbourne | W 81–90 | Daniel Johnson (22) | Daniel Johnson (8) | Josh Giddey (9) | John Cain Arena; 2,512 | 10–14 |
| 25 | 24 April | @ Melbourne | L 92–78 | Brandon Paul (20) | Josh Giddey (10) | Josh Giddey (7) | John Cain Arena; 3,034 | 10–15 |
| 26 | 26 April | @ New Zealand | L 93–77 | Daniel Johnson (20) | Josh Giddey (10) | Josh Giddey (10) | Silverdome; 893 | 10–16 |

May: 3–5 (home: 2–2; road: 1–3)

| Game | Date | Team | Score | High points | High rebounds | High assists | Location Attendance | Record |
|---|---|---|---|---|---|---|---|---|
| 27 | 1 May | Brisbane | W 101–79 | Daniel Johnson (26) | Josh Giddey (11) | Josh Giddey (13) | Adelaide Entertainment Centre; 6,683 | 11–16 |
| 28 | 4 May | Cairns | W 92–76 | Brandon Paul (18) | Johnson, Paul (10) | Josh Giddey (6) | Adelaide Entertainment Centre; 7,001 | 12–16 |
| 29 | 9 May | @ Sydney | W 88–97 (OT) | Daniel Johnson (20) | Josh Giddey (10) | Josh Giddey (12) | Qudos Bank Arena; 4,063 | 13–16 |
| 30 | 11 May | @ Illawarra | L 71–66 | Tony Crocker (16) | Giddey, Pinder (9) | Josh Giddey (8) | WIN Entertainment Centre; 2,036 | 13–17 |
| 31 | 16 May | @ Sydney | L 85–75 | Daniel Johnson (23) | Giddey, Johnson, Pinder 7 | Josh Giddey (5) | Qudos Bank Arena; 5,078 | 13–18 |
| 32 | 21 May | Illawarra | L 73–81 | Daniel Dillon (17) | Daniel Dillon (8) | Daniel Dillon (5) | Adelaide Entertainment Centre; 6,090 | 13–19 |
| 33 | 23 May | Perth | L 68–76 | Daniel Johnson (13) | Brandon Paul (11) | Crocker, Dillon (5) | Adelaide Entertainment Centre; 6,422 | 13–20 |
| 34 | 25 May | @ New Zealand | L 94–76 | Daniel Dillon (22) | Paul, Pinder (7) | Daniel Dillon (6) | Christchurch Arena; 2,803 | 13–21 |
| 35 | 30 May | @ Illawarra | L 97–83 | Sunday Dech (15) | Keanu Pinder (11) | Daniel Dillon (6) | WIN Entertainment Centre; 3,004 | 13–22 |

June: 0–1 (home: 0–0; road: 0–1)

| Game | Date | Team | Score | High points | High rebounds | High assists | Location Attendance | Record |
|---|---|---|---|---|---|---|---|---|
| 36 | 6 June | @ Melbourne | L 102–80 | Tony Crocker (27) | Daniel Johnson (13) | Daniel Dillon (6) | Adelaide Entertainment Centre; 1,817 | 13–23 |

== Awards ==
=== Player of the Week ===
Round 2, Isaac Humphries

Round 9, Josh Giddey

== See also ==
- 2020–21 NBL season
- Adelaide 36ers
