= 2020–21 Brisbane Bullets season =

Australian basketball club season

- Head coach: (Australia) Andrej Lemanis
- Captain: (Australia) Jason Cadee
- Arena: Nissan Arena

NBL results
- Record: 18–18 (50%)
- Ladder: 6th
- Finals finish: Did not qualify
- Stats at NBL.com.au

Cup results
- Record: 5–3 (62.5%)
- Ladder: 3rd
- Cup finish: Third place

The 2020–21 NBL season was the 35th season for the Brisbane Bullets in the NBL, and the 5th since their return to the league.

== Squad ==
=== Signings ===
- The Bullets retained Nathan Sobey, Jason Cadee, Matt Hodgson, Cameron Gliddon and Tyrell Harrison who had all signed multiple season contracts that covered the 2020–21 season.
- On 19 February 2020, following rumours that he was bound for the NBA, Will Magnay announced that he had re-signed with the Bullets on a two-year deal.
- On 2 May 2020, Hodgson announced that he had decided to opt out of his contract under the Australian Basketball Players' Association agreement which was designed to protect players during the COVID-19 pandemic.
- After exploring his options, on 20 May 2020 Hodgson announced that he would return to the Bullets.
- On 17 June 2020, the Bullets released Gliddon from the last year of his contract.
- On 15 July 2020, the Bullets signed Anthony Drmic on a two-year plus option deal. He previously played for the Adelaide 36ers.
- On 16 July 2020, Tanner Krebs signed his first professional contract with the Bullets on a two-year deal.
- On 17 July 2020, Harry Froling, another former 36er, signed a one-year plus option deal with the Bullets.
- On 20 July 2020, youngster Tamuri Wigness signed his first professional contract with the Bullets on a two-year deal.
- On 13 October 2020, development player Callum Dalton re-signed with the club for his fourth season with the Bullets.
- On 28 November 2020, Magnay was released by the club after he was signed by the New Orleans Pelicans on a two-way deal.
- On 4 December 2020, the Bullets signed their second import Vic Law.
- On 17 March 2021, the Bullets released Johnson and signed former Bullet Lamar Patterson as his replacement. As Patterson was injured, Jamaal Robateu was signed as an injury replacement player.
- On 19 April 2021, the Bullets signed B. J. Johnson to replace Law after he was ruled out of the remainder of the season due to injury.

=== Roster ===
Note: Flags indicate national team eligibility at FIBA-sanctioned events. Players may hold other non-FIBA nationalities not displayed.

2020–21 Brisbane Bullets roster
Players
Coaches

Pos.	No.	Nat.	Name	Ht.	Wt.	Age
G	0	(Australia)	Wigness, Tamuri	1.80 m (5 ft 11 in)	84 kg (185 lb)	24 – 26 March 2002
G	1	(Australia)	Jones, Blake (DP)	2.04 m (6 ft 8 in)	86 kg (190 lb)	24 – 28 February 2002
F	2	(Australia)	Dennis, Kian (DP)	1.97 m (6 ft 6 in)	83 kg (183 lb)	25 – 9 April 2001
G/F	3	(Australia)	Drmic, Anthony	1.98 m (6 ft 6 in)	93 kg (205 lb)	34 – 25 February 1992
F	4	(United States)	Law, Vic (injured) (IN)	2.01 m (6 ft 7 in)	91 kg (201 lb)	30 – 19 December 1995
G	5	(Australia)	Cadee, Jason (C)	1.86 m (6 ft 1 in)	80 kg (176 lb)	35 – 15 April 1991
C	6	(Australia)	Hodgson, Matt	2.11 m (6 ft 11 in)	115 kg (254 lb)	35 – 2 August 1991
F/C	9	(Australia)	Dalton, Callum (DP)	2.07 m (6 ft 9 in)	109 kg (240 lb)	26 – 4 May 2000
C	11	(Australia)	Froling, Harry	2.11 m (6 ft 11 in)	120 kg (265 lb)	28 – 20 April 1998
F	12	(United States)	Johnson, B. J. (I)	2.01 m (6 ft 7 in)	97 kg (214 lb)	30 – 21 December 1995
G/F	13	(United States)	Patterson, Lamar (I)	1.96 m (6 ft 5 in)	100 kg (220 lb)	35 – 12 August 1991
G	17	(Australia)	Krebs, Tanner	1.98 m (6 ft 6 in)	91 kg (201 lb)	30 – 4 January 1996
G	18	(Australia)	Robateau, Jamaal	1.96 m (6 ft 5 in)	82 kg (181 lb)	32 – 18 May 1994
G	20	(Australia)	Sobey, Nathan	1.88 m (6 ft 2 in)	86 kg (190 lb)	36 – 14 July 1990
C	24	(New Zealand)	Harrison, Tyrell	2.14 m (7 ft 0 in)	95 kg (209 lb)	27 – 6 July 1999

Head coach

- (Australia) Andrej Lemanis

Assistant coach(es)

- (Australia) C. J. Bruton
- (Australia) Greg Vanderjagt

Legend

- (C) Team captain
- (DP) Development player
- (IN) Inactive
- (I) Import player
- (TP) Training player
- (NS) Next Star player
- Injured

- Roster
Updated: 19 April 2021

== Pre-season ==
To launch their season after the delayed start, the Bullets will first face the Adelaide 36ers.

=== Ladder ===
2020–21 NBL pre-season ladder
Ladder
Information

Pos.	Nat.	Name	Pld.	W.	L.	Last 5	Streak	Home	Away	For	Against	Pts %	Win %
1	(Australia)	Melbourne	1	1	0	1–0	W1	0–0	1–0	97	81	119.75%	100.00%
2	(Australia)	Sydney	1	1	0	1–0	W1	1–0	0–0	98	89	110.11%	100.00%
3	(Australia)	Adelaide	3	2	1	2–1	L1	2–0	0–1	276	225	122.67%	66.67%
4	(Australia)	Perth (RC)	2	1	1	1–1	L1	1–1	0–0	165	165	100.00%	50.00%
5	(Australia)	Cairns	2	1	1	1–1	W1	1–1	0–0	177	185	95.68%	50.00%
6	(Australia)	Brisbane	4	2	2	2–2	W2	2–0	0–2	347	378	91.80%	50.00%
7	(Australia)	Illawarra	3	1	2	1–2	L1	0–0	1–2	254	263	96.58%	33.33%
8	(Australia)	S.E. Melbourne	2	0	2	0–2	L2	0–0	0–2	198	210	94.29%	0.00%

Total Rounds
5 weeks

Total Games
11 games

Legend
- (RC) Reigning Champion

- Updated: 9 January 2021

=== Game log ===
2020 pre-season game log
Total: 2–2 (Home: 2–0; Road: 0–2)
November: 0–2 (home: 0–0; road: 0–2)

Game	Date	Team	Score	High points	High rebounds	High assists	Location Attendance	Record
1	13 November	@ Adelaide	L 93–75	Anthony Drmic (17)	Tyrell Harrison (9)	Jeremy Kendle (5)	Adelaide Entertainment Centre; 4,516	0–1
2	15 November	@ Adelaide	L 87–62	Nathan Sobey (14)	Harry Froling (9)	Nathan Sobey (4)	Titanium Security Arena; 200	0–2

December : 2–0 (home: 2–0; road: 0–0)

Game	Date	Team	Score	High points	High rebounds	High assists	Location Attendance	Record
3	18 December	South East Melbourne	W 108–98	Anthony Drmic (21)	Matt Hodgson (10)	Cadee, Sobey (7)	Gold Coast Sports and Leisure Centre; 1,120	1–2
4	20 December	South East Melbourne	W 102–100	Harry Froling (30)	Froling, Hodgson (9)	Jason Cadee (8)	Gold Coast Sports and Leisure Centre not announced	2–2

== Regular season ==
=== Ladder ===
Pos	2020–21 NBL season											
Pos	Team	Pld	W	L	PCT	Last 5	Streak	Home	Away	PF	PA	PP
1	Melbourne United	36	28	8	77.78%	4–1	W3	14–4	14–4	3189	2956	107.88%
2	Perth Wildcats	36	25	11	69.44%	3–2	L2	13–5	12–6	3133	2900	108.03%
3	Illawarra Hawks	36	20	16	55.56%	4–1	L1	11–7	9–9	2962	2954	100.27%
4	S.E. Melbourne Phoenix	36	19	17	52.78%	2–3	L1	9–9	10–8	3217	3124	102.98%
5	Sydney Kings	36	19	17	52.78%	4–1	W3	11–7	8–10	3112	3087	100.81%
6	Brisbane Bullets	36	18	18	50.00%	4–1	W1	9–9	9–9	3204	3274	97.86%
7	Adelaide 36ers	36	13	23	36.11%	0–5	L7	10–8	3–15	2985	3156	94.58%
8	New Zealand Breakers	36	12	24	33.33%	2–3	L1	8–10	4–14	2937	3021	97.22%
9	Cairns Taipans	36	8	28	22.22%	1–4	L2	6–12	2–16	2940	3207	91.67%

Updated to match(es) played on 9 June 2021. Source: NBL.com.au

=== Ladder progression ===
- Numbers highlighted in green indicate that the team finished the round inside the top four.
- Numbers highlighted in blue indicates the team finished first on the ladder in that round.
- Numbers highlighted in red indicates the team finished last place on the ladder in that round.

2020–21 NBL season
Team	1	2	3	4	5	NBL Cup				10	11	12	13	14	15	16	17	18	19	20	21
Team	1	2	3	4	5	6	7	8	9	10	11	12	13	14	15	16	17	18	19	20	21
Adelaide 36ers	3	5	3	3	3	4	6	5	7	7	7	7	7	7	7	7	7	7	7	7	7
Brisbane Bullets	6	9	5	6	6	7	5	4	5	5	6	6	5	6	6	6	6	6	6	6	6
Cairns Taipans	4	7	8	8	8	8	9	9	9	9	9	9	9	9	9	9	9	9	9	9	9
Illawarra Hawks	2	3	1	2	2	2	4	3	3	4	3	5	4	5	5	5	5	4	4	3	3
Melbourne United	1	1	2	1	1	1	1	1	1	2	2	2	1	1	1	1	1	1	1	1	1
New Zealand Breakers	–	8	9	9	9	9	8	8	8	8	8	8	8	8	8	8	8	8	8	8	8
Perth Wildcats	–	2	4	7	7	3	2	2	2	1	1	1	2	2	2	2	2	2	2	2	2
S.E. Melbourne Phoenix	7	6	6	4	4	5	3	7	4	3	4	3	3	3	4	4	4	3	3	4	4
Sydney Kings	5	4	7	5	5	6	7	6	6	6	5	4	6	4	3	3	3	5	5	5	5

=== Game log ===
2020–21 game log
Total: 17–18 (Home: 8–9; Road: 9–9)
January: 2–2 (home: 2–2; road: 0–0)

Game	Date	Team	Score	High points	High rebounds	High assists	Location Attendance	Record
1	16 January	The Hawks	L 84–90	Nathan Sobey (19)	Harry Froling (12)	Harry Froling (4)	Nissan Arena; 1,746	0–1
2	21 January	The Hawks	L 82–90	Nathan Sobey (24)	Froling, Harrison, Law (11)	Jason Cadee (9)	Nissan Arena; 1,591	0–2
3	26 January	Sydney	W 90–87	Vic Law (27)	Tyrell Harrison (11)	Nathan Sobey (7)	Nissan Arena; 3,406	1–2
4	30 January	Cairns	W 105–103 (OT)	Nathan Sobey (30)	Vic Law (11)	Nathan Sobey (5)	Nissan Arena; 4,065	2–2

February : 1–2 (home: 0–2; road: 1–0)

Game	Date	Team	Score	High points	High rebounds	High assists	Location Attendance	Record
5	5 February	Melbourne	L 96–109	Nathan Sobey (27)	Johnson, Law (7)	Vic Law (4)	Nissan Arena; 2,234	2–3
6	13 February	Adelaide	L 70–85	Nathan Sobey (25)	Vic Law (10)	Johnson, Sobey (2)	Nissan Arena; 4,240	2–4
7	15 February	@ Adelaide	W 74–93	Vic Law (27)	Law, Johnson (9)	Cadee, Sobey (5)	Adelaide Entertainment Centre; 5,183	3–4

NBL Cup: 5–3 (home: 3–1; road: 2–2)

Game	Date	Team	Score	High points	High rebounds	High assists	Location Attendance	Record
8	21 February	@ South East Melbourne	L 99–83	Matt Hodgson (20)	Matt Hodgson (9)	Nathan Sobey (4)	John Cain Arena; 2,566	3–5
9	26 February	Illawarra	W 97–91	Vic Law (29)	Vic Law (9)	Cadee, Sobey (6)	John Cain Arena; 809	4–5
10	28 February	Cairns	W 115–95	Nathan Sobey (30)	Harry Froling (11)	Jason Cadee (6)	John Cain Arena; 3,195	5–5
11	3 March	@ New Zealand	L 97–92	Vic Law (19)	Vic Law (10)	Jason Cadee (6)	State Basketball Centre; 2,257	5–6
12	5 March	@ Perth	W 92–95	Nathan Sobey (31)	Matt Hodgson (9)	Nathan Sobey (4)	John Cain Arena; 3,421	6–6
13	7 March	@ Melbourne	W 88–96	Matt Hodgson (24)	Vic Law (15)	Nathan Sobey (5)	John Cain Arena; 3,696	7–6
14	11 March	Adelaide	W 109–104	Nathan Sobey (30)	Matt Hodgson (7)	Vic Law (4)	John Cain Arena; 997	8–6
15	13 March	Sydney	L 108–119	Nathan Sobey (35)	Hodgson, Law (9)	Cadee, Sobey (6)	John Cain Arena; 4,183	8–7

March: 1–2 (home: 1–1; road: 0–1)

Game	Date	Team	Score	High points	High rebounds	High assists	Location Attendance	Record
16	20 March	New Zealand	W 88–67	Harry Froling (20)	Matt Hodgson (10)	Jason Cadee (4)	Nissan Arena; 3,386	9–7
17	27 March	New Zealand	L 76–81 (OT)	Anthony Drmic (25)	Tyrell Harrison (16)	Harry Froling (3)	Nissan Arena; 2,935	9–8
18	29 March	@ Illawarra	L 96–72	Jason Cadee (17)	Matt Hodgson (9)	Nathan Sobey (6)	WIN Entertainment Centre; 2,521	9–9

April: 2–4 (home: 0–0; road: 2–4)

Game	Date	Team	Score	High points	High rebounds	High assists	Location Attendance	Record
19	3 April	@ Sydney	L 90–71	Nathan Sobey (31)	Tyrell Harrison (19)	Harry Froling (5)	Qudos Bank Arena; 5,439	9–10
20	7 April	@ Illawarra	W 82–88	Jason Cadee (22)	Matt Hodgson (14)	Nathan Sobey (6)	WIN Entertainment Centre; 2,426	10–10
21	12 April	@ Melbourne	L 98–89	Nathan Sobey (30)	Matt Hodgson (8)	Jason Cadee (7)	John Cain Arena; 3,422	10–11
22	16 April	@ New Zealand	L 91–71	Matt Hodgson (16)	Harrison, Hodgson, Sobey (6)	Nathan Sobey (2)	Silverdome; 1,559	10–12
23	23 April	@ Perth	L 92–74	Harry Froling (20)	Lamar Patterson (10)	Nathan Sobey (5)	RAC Arena; 4,737	10–13
24	29 April	@ South East Melbourne	W 82–94	Lamar Patterson (27)	Matt Hodgson (9)	Nathan Sobey (8)	John Cain Arena; 1,026	11–13

May: 5–4 (home: 2–3; road: 3–1)

Game	Date	Team	Score	High points	High rebounds	High assists	Location Attendance	Record
25	1 May	@ Adelaide	L 101–79	Nathan Sobey (20)	Matt Hodgson (9)	Nathan Sobey (8)	Adelaide Entertainment Centre; 6,683	11–14
26	8 May	@ Cairns	W 87–96	Nathan Sobey (25)	Harrison, Sobey (9)	Nathan Sobey (5)	Cairns Pop-Up Arena; 1,903	12–14
27	13 May	Sydney	W 93–70	Anthony Drmic (28)	Tyrell Harrison (7)	Nathan Sobey (8)	Nissan Arena; 1,373	13–14
28	15 May	Perth	L 90–102	Nathan Sobey (24)	Hodgson, Patterson (9)	Lamar Patterson (7)	Nissan Arena; 3,405	13–15
29	19 May	Perth	W 91–88	Lamar Patterson (23)	Matt Hodgson (12)	Jason Cadee (5)	Nissan Arena; 1,332	14–15
30	22 May	South East Melbourne	L 66–95	Anthony Drmic (20)	Tyrell Harrison (8)	Cadee, Sobey (4)	Nissan Arena; 2,533	14–16
31	24 May	Melbourne	L 88–99	Nathan Sobey (20)	Matthew Hodgson (9)	Jason Cadee (5)	Nissan Arena; 1,614	14–17
32	26 May	@ Cairns	W 96–101	Nathan Sobey (21)	Harry Froling (8)	Nathan Sobey (8)	Cairns Pop-Up Arena; 1,908	15–17
33	30 May	@ New Zealand	W 83–95	Lamar Patterson (21)	Matt Hodgson (9)	Jason Cadee (8)	Spark Arena; 7,612	16–17

June: 2–1 (home: 1–0; road: 1–1)

Game	Date	Team	Score	High points	High rebounds	High assists	Location Attendance	Record
34	2 June	@ South East Melbourne	W 84–91	Nathan Sobey (22)	Nathan Sobey (9)	Cadee, Sobey (6)	Cairns Pop-Up Arena closed event	17–17
35	5 June	@ Sydney	L 83–82	Nathan Sobey (22)	Nathan Sobey (8)	Nathan Sobey (8)	Qudos Bank Arena; 9,267	17–18
36	8 June	South East Melbourne	W 94–84	Lamar Patterson (19)	Nathan Sobey (11)	Nathan Sobey (4)	Nissan Arena; 2,508	18–18

== Awards ==
=== Player of the Week ===
Round 3, Vic Law, Nathan Sobey

Round 21, Nathan Sobey

== See also ==
- 2020–21 NBL season
- Brisbane Bullets
