= 2020–21 S.E. Melbourne Phoenix season =

- Head coach: (Australia) Simon Mitchell
- Co-captains: (Australia) Kyle Adnam (Australia) Adam Gibson
- Arena: John Cain Arena

NBL results
- Record: 19–17 (52.8%)
- Ladder: 4th
- Finals finish: Semifinalist (lost to United 1–2)
- Stats at NBL.com.au

Cup results
- Record: 5–3 (62.5%)
- Ladder: 2nd
- Cup finish: Runners-up

The 2020–21 NBL season was the 2nd season for the South East Melbourne Phoenix in the NBL.

== Roster ==
=== Squad ===
Note: Flags indicate national team eligibility at FIBA-sanctioned events. Players may hold other non-FIBA nationalities not displayed.

2020–21 South East Melbourne Phoenix roster
Players
Coaches

Pos.	No.	Nat.	Name	Ht.	Wt.	Age
G	1	(Australia)	Gibson, Adam (C)	1.88 m (6 ft 2 in)	93 kg (205 lb)	39 – 30 October 1986
G	3	(Australia)	Gliddon, Cameron	1.97 m (6 ft 6 in)	94 kg (207 lb)	37 – 16 August 1989
G	4	(Australia)	Adnam, Kyle (C)	1.86 m (6 ft 1 in)	83 kg (183 lb)	32 – 18 November 1993
G/F	7	(New Zealand)	Te Rangi, Reuben	1.98 m (6 ft 6 in)	105 kg (231 lb)	31 – 14 October 1994
G	8	(New Zealand)	Le'afa, Izayah (DP)	1.88 m (6 ft 2 in)	90 kg (198 lb)	29 – 7 November 1996
F	10	(New Zealand)	Wetzell, Yanni	2.08 m (6 ft 10 in)	109 kg (240 lb)	30 – 8 July 1996
G	21	(Australia)	Stephens, Kendall (injured)	2.01 m (6 ft 7 in)	93 kg (205 lb)	31 – 11 November 1994
C	22	(Australia)	Pineau, Dane (injured)	2.06 m (6 ft 9 in)	102 kg (225 lb)	32 – 2 August 1994
F/C	26	(United States)	Moore, Ben (I)	2.03 m (6 ft 8 in)	100 kg (220 lb)	31 – 13 May 1995
G	28	(United States)	Sykes, Keifer (I)	1.80 m (5 ft 11 in)	80 kg (176 lb)	32 – 30 December 1993
F/C	30	(Australia)	Forsyth, Tristan (DP)	2.08 m (6 ft 10 in)	107 kg (236 lb)	28 – 19 January 1998
G/F	45	(Australia)	Broekhoff, Ryan (injured)	1.98 m (6 ft 6 in)	98 kg (216 lb)	36 – 23 August 1990
C	50	(New Zealand)	Karena, Mike	2.08 m (6 ft 10 in)	122 kg (269 lb)	32 – 24 October 1993
G/F	55	(Australia)	Creek, Mitch	1.96 m (6 ft 5 in)	98 kg (216 lb)	34 – 27 April 1992

Head coach

- (Australia) Simon Mitchell

Assistant coach(es)

- (New Zealand) Judd Flavell
- (Australia) Luke Kendall

Legend

- (C) Team captain
- (DP) Development player
- (IN) Inactive
- (I) Import player
- (TP) Training player
- (NS) Next Star player
- Injured

- Roster
Updated: 12 March 2021

== Pre-season ==
=== Ladder ===
2020–21 NBL pre-season ladder
Ladder
Information

Pos.	Nat.	Name	Pld.	W.	L.	Last 5	Streak	Home	Away	For	Against	Pts %	Win %
1	(Australia)	Melbourne	1	1	0	1–0	W1	0–0	1–0	97	81	119.75%	100.00%
2	(Australia)	Sydney	1	1	0	1–0	W1	1–0	0–0	98	89	110.11%	100.00%
3	(Australia)	Adelaide	3	2	1	2–1	L1	2–0	0–1	276	225	122.67%	66.67%
4	(Australia)	Perth (RC)	2	1	1	1–1	L1	1–1	0–0	165	165	100.00%	50.00%
5	(Australia)	Cairns	2	1	1	1–1	W1	1–1	0–0	177	185	95.68%	50.00%
6	(Australia)	Brisbane	4	2	2	2–2	W2	2–0	0–2	347	378	91.80%	50.00%
7	(Australia)	Illawarra	3	1	2	1–2	L1	0–0	1–2	254	263	96.58%	33.33%
8	(Australia)	S.E. Melbourne	2	0	2	0–2	L2	0–0	0–2	198	210	94.29%	0.00%

Total Rounds
5 weeks

Total Games
11 games

Legend
- (RC) Reigning Champion

- Updated: 9 January 2021

=== Game log ===
2020 pre-season game log
Total: 0–2 (home: 0–0; road: 0–2)
December: 0–2 (home: 0–0; road: 0–2)

Game	Date	Team	Score	High points	High rebounds	High assists	Location Attendance	Record
1	18 December	@ Brisbane	L 108–98	Mitch Creek (31)	Mitch Creek (7)	Mitch Creek (4)	Gold Coast Sports and Leisure Centre; 1,120	0–1
2	20 December	@ Brisbane	L 102–100	Mitch Creek (29)	Mitch Creek (10)	Kyle Adnam (6)	Gold Coast Sports and Leisure Centre not announced	0–2

== Regular season ==
=== Ladder ===
Pos	2020–21 NBL season											
Pos	Team	Pld	W	L	PCT	Last 5	Streak	Home	Away	PF	PA	PP
1	Melbourne United	36	28	8	77.78%	4–1	W3	14–4	14–4	3189	2956	107.88%
2	Perth Wildcats	36	25	11	69.44%	3–2	L2	13–5	12–6	3133	2900	108.03%
3	Illawarra Hawks	36	20	16	55.56%	4–1	L1	11–7	9–9	2962	2954	100.27%
4	S.E. Melbourne Phoenix	36	19	17	52.78%	2–3	L1	9–9	10–8	3217	3124	102.98%
5	Sydney Kings	36	19	17	52.78%	4–1	W3	11–7	8–10	3112	3087	100.81%
6	Brisbane Bullets	36	18	18	50.00%	4–1	W1	9–9	9–9	3204	3274	97.86%
7	Adelaide 36ers	36	13	23	36.11%	0–5	L7	10–8	3–15	2985	3156	94.58%
8	New Zealand Breakers	36	12	24	33.33%	2–3	L1	8–10	4–14	2937	3021	97.22%
9	Cairns Taipans	36	8	28	22.22%	1–4	L2	6–12	2–16	2940	3207	91.67%

Updated to match(es) played on 9 June 2021. Source: NBL.com.au

=== Ladder progression ===
- Numbers highlighted in green indicate that the team finished the round inside the top four.
- Numbers highlighted in blue indicates the team finished first on the ladder in that round.
- Numbers highlighted in red indicates the team finished last place on the ladder in that round.

2020–21 NBL season
Team	1	2	3	4	5	NBL Cup				10	11	12	13	14	15	16	17	18	19	20	21
Team	1	2	3	4	5	6	7	8	9	10	11	12	13	14	15	16	17	18	19	20	21
Adelaide 36ers	3	5	3	3	3	4	6	5	7	7	7	7	7	7	7	7	7	7	7	7	7
Brisbane Bullets	6	9	5	6	6	7	5	4	5	5	6	6	5	6	6	6	6	6	6	6	6
Cairns Taipans	4	7	8	8	8	8	9	9	9	9	9	9	9	9	9	9	9	9	9	9	9
Illawarra Hawks	2	3	1	2	2	2	4	3	3	4	3	5	4	5	5	5	5	4	4	3	3
Melbourne United	1	1	2	1	1	1	1	1	1	2	2	2	1	1	1	1	1	1	1	1	1
New Zealand Breakers	–	8	9	9	9	9	8	8	8	8	8	8	8	8	8	8	8	8	8	8	8
Perth Wildcats	–	2	4	7	7	3	2	2	2	1	1	1	2	2	2	2	2	2	2	2	2
S.E. Melbourne Phoenix	7	6	6	4	4	5	3	7	4	3	4	3	3	3	4	4	4	3	3	4	4
Sydney Kings	5	4	7	5	5	6	7	6	6	6	5	4	6	4	3	3	3	5	5	5	5

=== Game log ===
2020–21 game log
Total: 19–17 (home: 9–9; road: 10–8)
January: 2–3 (home: 0–0; road: 2–3)

Game	Date	Team	Score	High points	High rebounds	High assists	Location Attendance	Record
1	17 January	@ Adelaide	L 116–108 (2OT)	Mitch Creek (30)	Yanni Wetzell (11)	Keifer Sykes (11)	Adelaide Entertainment Centre; 6,518	0–1
2	20 January	@ Adelaide	W 83–89	Keifer Sykes (24)	Ben Moore (13)	Keifer Sykes (8)	Adelaide Entertainment Centre; 6,946	1–1
3	24 January	@ Perth	L 88–76	Mitch Creek (17)	Yanni Wetzell (11)	Keifer Sykes (5)	RAC Arena; 7,150	1–2
4	29 January	@ Perth	W 89–90	Mitch Creek (24)	Creek, Moore (7)	Keifer Sykes (9)	RAC Arena; 7,150	2–2
5	31 January	@ Melbourne	L 96–90	Keifer Sykes (24)	Ben Moore (10)	Creek, Sykes (7)	Bendigo Stadium; 2,000	2–3

February : 2–1 (home: 2–1; road: 0–0)

Game	Date	Team	Score	High points	High rebounds	High assists	Location Attendance	Record
6	7 February	The Hawks	W 98–82	Adnam, Creek, Gliddon, Moore, Sykes (15)	Ben Moore (14)	Keifer Sykes (7)	State Basketball Centre; 2,175	3–3
7	11 February	Perth	L 75–106	Kyle Adnam (24)	Mitch Creek (11)	Kyle Adnam (3)	State Basketball Centre; 1,875	3–4
8	14 February	Perth	W 96–71	Keifer Sykes (24)	Yanni Wetzell (10)	Keifer Sykes (7)	State Basketball Centre closed event	4–4

NBL Cup: 5–3 (home: 3–1; road: 2–2)

Game	Date	Team	Score	High points	High rebounds	High assists	Location Attendance	Record
9	21 February	Brisbane	W 99–83	Mitch Creek (29)	Keifer Sykes (10)	Keifer Sykes (11)	John Cain Arena; 2,566	5–4
10	23 February	@ Adelaide	L 99–94	Mitch Creek (23)	Mitch Creek (12)	Mitch Creek (8)	John Cain Arena; 1,079	5–5
11	28 February	Illawarra	W 93–76	Mitch Creek (25)	Mitch Creek (6)	Kyle Adnam (11)	John Cain Arena; 3,195	6–5
12	3 March	@ Perth	L 93–92	Kyle Adnam (28)	Mitch Creek (8)	Mitch Creek (8)	State Basketball Centre; 2,257	6–6
13	6 March	Sydney	L 85–91	Mitch Creek (22)	Mitch Creek (9)	Kyle Adnam (4)	John Cain Arena; 3,708	6–7
14	10 March	Melbourne	W 97–92	Mitch Creek (31)	Mitch Creek (10)	Kyle Adnam (8)	John Cain Arena; 3,675	7–7
15	12 March	@ Cairns	W 81–85	Mitch Creek (21)	Gliddon, Wetzell (8)	Cameron Gliddon (5)	John Cain Arena; 2,478	8–7
16	14 March	@ New Zealand	W 89–103	Adnam, Creek (21)	Ben Moore (5)	Kyle Adnam (7)	John Cain Arena; 4,019	9–7

March: 1–1 (home: 1–1; road: 0–0)

Game	Date	Team	Score	High points	High rebounds	High assists	Location Attendance	Record
17	20 March	Adelaide	W 96–89 (OT)	Ben Moore (23)	Ben Moore (10)	Ben Moore (5)	John Cain Arena; 1,682	10–7
18	27 March	Melbourne	L 60–80	Cameron Gliddon (13)	Ben Moore (7)	Cameron Gliddon (4)	John Cain Arena; 3,370	10–8

April: 4–5 (home: 1–3; road: 3–2)

Game	Date	Team	Score	High points	High rebounds	High assists	Location Attendance	Record
19	2 April	@ Illawarra	W 63–95	Ryan Broekhoff (26)	Yanni Wetzell (11)	Adnam, Gliddon, Wetzell 5	WIN Entertainment Centre; 2,602	11–8
20	4 April	New Zealand	W 92–85	Mitch Creek (24)	Yanni Wetzell (10)	Kyle Adnam (7)	John Cain Arena; 1,850	12–8
21	9 April	@ Illawarra	L 82–80	Kyle Adnam (22)	Cameron Gliddon (8)	Gibson, Wetzell (4)	WIN Entertainment Centre; 2,533	12–9
22	11 April	@ Sydney	W 84–98	Mitch Creek (26)	Ben Moore (6)	Kyle Adnam (6)	Qudos Bank Arena; 4,236	13–9
23	15 April	@ Sydney	L 97–90	Izayah Mauriohooho-Le'afa (29)	Ben Moore (7)	Keifer Sykes (5)	Qudos Bank Arena; 4,476	13–10
24	17 April	Adelaide	L 81–90	Mitch Creek (17)	Mitch Creek (14)	Adnam, Gibson, Moore (3)	John Cain Arena; 2,512	13–11
25	22 April	Sydney	L 81–101	Mitch Creek (29)	Yanni Wetzell (6)	Kyle Adnam (5)	John Cain Arena; 1,268	13–12
26	25 April	@ Cairns	W 66–86	Cameron Gliddon (22)	Mitch Creek (8)	Izayah Mauriohooho-Le'afa (4)	Cairns Pop-Up Arena; 1,905	14–12
27	29 April	Brisbane	L 82–94	Ben Moore (18)	Ben Moore (7)	Izayah Mauriohooho-Le'afa (4)	John Cain Arena; 1,026	14–13

May: 4–2 (home: 2–2; road: 2–0)

Game	Date	Team	Score	High points	High rebounds	High assists	Location Attendance	Record
28	8 May	Melbourne	L 82–93	Izayah Mauriohooho-Le'afa (19)	Yanni Wetzell (9)	Keifer Sykes (5)	John Cain Arena; 3,899	14–14
29	12 May	New Zealand	W 91–82	Keifer Sykes (21)	Ben Moore (6)	Kyle Adnam (5)	John Cain Arena; 1,247	15–14
30	14 May	Cairns	W 106–77	Mitch Creek (20)	Yanni Wetzell (11)	Keifer Sykes (4)	John Cain Arena; 1,711	16–14
31	16 May	@ Melbourne	W 83–94	Keifer Sykes (26)	Mitch Creek (8)	Mitch Creek (8)	John Cain Arena; 3,460	17–14
32	22 May	@ Brisbane	W 66–95	Yanni Wetzell (18)	Yanni Wetzell (9)	Keifer Sykes (8)	Nissan Arena; 2,533	18–14
33	28 May	Cairns	L 87–94	Yanni Wetzell (25)	Yanni Wetzell (7)	Keifer Sykes (7)	Cairns Pop-Up Arena; 1,251	18–15

June: 1–2 (home: 0–1; road: 1–1)

Game	Date	Team	Score	High points	High rebounds	High assists	Location Attendance	Record
34	2 June	Brisbane	L 84–91	Mitch Creek (28)	Mitch Creek (10)	Keifer Sykes (8)	Cairns Pop-Up Arena closed event	18–16
35	5 June	@ New Zealand	W 78–83	Keifer Sykes (29)	Ryan Broekhoff (10)	Keifer Sykes (5)	The Trusts Arena; 3,872	19–16
36	8 June	@ Brisbane	L 94–84	Mitch Creek (17)	Ben Moore (16)	Kyle Adnam (6)	Nissan Arena; 2,508	19–17

== Postseason ==
2021 playoff game log
Total: 1–2 (home: 1–0; road: 0–2)
Semifinals: 1–2 (home: 1–0; road: 0–2)

Game	Date	Team	Score	High points	High rebounds	High assists	Location Attendance	Series
1	11 June	@ Melbourne	L 96–78	Ben Moore (17)	Broekhoff, Wetzell (7)	Mitch Creek (6)	Qudos Bank Arena; 500	0–1
2	13 June	Melbourne	W 90–79	Creek, Sykes (26)	Yanni Wetzell (8)	Keifer Sykes (4)	Qudos Bank Arena; 500	1–1
3	15 June	@ Melbourne	L 84–74	Reuben Te Rangi (22)	Mitch Creek (9)	Keifer Sykes (4)	Qudos Bank Arena; 500	1–2

== Transactions ==
=== Re-signed ===
Player	Signed
Kendall Stephens	18 June

=== Additions ===
Player	Signed	Former team
Cameron Gliddon	16 July	Brisbane Bullets
Reuben Te Rangi	22 July	Brisbane Bullets
Yanni Wetzell	28 July	San Diego State
Izayah Mauriohooho-Le’afa	24 September	Sacramento State
Yanni Wetzell	14 October	Riesen Ludwigsburg
Ben Moore	9 November	Fort Wayne Mad Ants
Tristan Forsyth	1 December	California Baptist
Keifer Sykes	8 December	Panathinaikos B.C.
Mike Karena	15 January	Nelson Giants
Ryan Broekhoff	15 February	Dallas Mavericks

=== Subtractions ===
Player	Reason left	New team
Tai Wesley	Retired	N/A
Ben Madgen	Retired	N/A
John Roberson	Free agent	CB Estudiantes
Daniel Trist	Free agent	New Zealand Breakers
Yanni Wetzell	Released	Riesen Ludwigsburg

== Awards ==
=== Player of the Week ===
Round 6, Mitch Creek

Round 18, Keifer Sykes

== See also ==
- 2020–21 NBL season
- South East Melbourne Phoenix
