= 2020–21 Illawarra Hawks season =

Australian basketball club season

- Head coach: (United States) Brian Goorjian
- Captain: (Australia) Andrew Ogilvy
- Arena: Wollongong Entertainment Centre

NBL results
- Record: 20–16 (55.6%)
- Ladder: 3rd
- Finals finish: Semifinalist (lost to Wildcats 1–2)
- Stats at NBL.com.au

Cup results
- Record: 4–4 (50%)
- Ladder: 6th
- Cup finish: N/A

The 2020–21 Illawarra Hawks season was the 43rd season of the franchise in the National Basketball League (NBL), and their first under the leadership of their new head coach Brian Goorjian.

== Roster ==
=== Signings ===
- The Illawarra Hawks retained five players due to them signing multiple season contracts, who were Angus Glover, Sam Froling, Todd Blanchfield, Emmett Naar and Sunday Dech.
- Following the rebranding of the club to The Hawks by the new owners, on 23 June Brian Goorjian was signed as the new head coach. Due to the club being liquidated, all remaining contracts were voided.
- On 15 July, Emmett Naar re-signed with The Hawks for a fourth season.
- On 16 July, Deng Deng returned to Australia on a one-year deal with The Hawks.
- On 21 July, Daniel Grida also re-signed with The Hawks.
- On 22 July, Sam Froling returned to The Hawks on a two-season deal.
- On 23 July, Deng Adel signed with The Hawks.
- On 24 July, Stanford University college guard Isaac White signed with the club.
- On 28 July, Tyler Harvey signed with The Hawks on a one-year deal.
- On 4 August, Cameron Bairstow returned from his short stint in Europe to sign with The Hawks.
- On 5 August, New Zealand teenager Max Darling signed with The Hawks.
- On 14 August, former NBA G League player Justin Simon signed with the club on a one-year deal.
- On 28 August, The Hawks signed Justinian Jessup to their Next Stars roster position. Jessup, who played college basketball for the Boise State Broncos, was signing his first professional contract.
- On 8 September, Andrew Ogilvy re-signed with The Hawks as an injury replacement for Grida.
- On 12 October, The Hawks announced that Akoldah Gak had signed a three-year contract with the club, with the first season as a development player.
- On 12 January, Lachlan Dent was signed as a development player.
- On 3 May, Adel and the Hawks mutually agreed to part ways due to ongoing injuries.
- On 11 May, Tim Coenraad came out of retirement to join the Hawks as an injury replacement for Cameron Bairstow.

=== Squad ===
Note: Flags indicate national team eligibility at FIBA-sanctioned events. Players may hold other non-FIBA nationalities not displayed.

2020–21 Illawarra Hawks roster
Players
Coaches

Pos.	No.	Nat.	Name	Ht.	Wt.	Age
G	0	(United States)	Simon, Justin (I)	1.96 m (6 ft 5 in)	98 kg (216 lb)	30 – 6 May 1996
G	1	(United States)	Harvey, Tyler (I)	1.93 m (6 ft 4 in)	84 kg (185 lb)	33 – 17 July 1993
G	2	(Australia)	White, Isaac	1.88 m (6 ft 2 in)	82 kg (181 lb)	28 – 22 June 1998
G	3	(Australia)	Naar, Emmett	1.85 m (6 ft 1 in)	88 kg (194 lb)	32 – 3 July 1994
C	6	(Australia)	Ogilvy, Andrew (C)	2.11 m (6 ft 11 in)	115 kg (254 lb)	38 – 17 June 1988
F	7	(Australia)	Deng, Deng	2.03 m (6 ft 8 in)	93 kg (205 lb)	34 – 5 January 1992
F/C	8	(New Zealand)	Darling, Max	1.99 m (6 ft 6 in)	100 kg (220 lb)	25 – 30 September 2000
G	10	(United States)	Jessup, Justinian (NS)	2.01 m (6 ft 7 in)	92 kg (203 lb)	28 – 23 May 1998
G/F	11	(Australia)	Grida, Daniel	1.97 m (6 ft 6 in)	93 kg (205 lb)	28 – 26 April 1998
F/C	13	(Australia)	Froling, Sam	2.13 m (7 ft 0 in)	109 kg (240 lb)	26 – 10 February 2000
G	17	(Australia)	Dent, Lachlan (DP)	1.83 m (6 ft 0 in)		26 – 1 February 2000
F/C	41	(Australia)	Bairstow, Cameron	2.06 m (6 ft 9 in)	113 kg (249 lb)	35 – 7 December 1990
F	47	(Australia)	Gak, Akoldah (DP)	2.11 m (6 ft 11 in)	91 kg (201 lb)	24 – 12 July 2002
F	79	(Australia)	Coenraad, Tim	1.99 m (6 ft 6 in)	97 kg (214 lb)	41 – 5 June 1985

Head coach

- (United States) Brian Goorjian

Assistant coach(es)

- (Australia) Jacob Jackomas
- (Australia) Shaun Roger

Legend

- (C) Team captain
- (DP) Development player
- (IN) Inactive
- (I) Import player
- (TP) Training player
- (NS) Next Star player
- Injured

- Roster
Updated: 16 May 2021

== Pre-season ==
=== Ladder ===
2020–21 NBL pre-season ladder
Ladder
Information

Pos.	Nat.	Name	Pld.	W.	L.	Last 5	Streak	Home	Away	For	Against	Pts %	Win %
1	(Australia)	Melbourne	1	1	0	1–0	W1	0–0	1–0	97	81	119.75%	100.00%
2	(Australia)	Sydney	1	1	0	1–0	W1	1–0	0–0	98	89	110.11%	100.00%
3	(Australia)	Adelaide	3	2	1	2–1	L1	2–0	0–1	276	225	122.67%	66.67%
4	(Australia)	Perth (RC)	2	1	1	1–1	L1	1–1	0–0	165	165	100.00%	50.00%
5	(Australia)	Cairns	2	1	1	1–1	W1	1–1	0–0	177	185	95.68%	50.00%
6	(Australia)	Brisbane	4	2	2	2–2	W2	2–0	0–2	347	378	91.80%	50.00%
7	(Australia)	Illawarra	3	1	2	1–2	L1	0–0	1–2	254	263	96.58%	33.33%
8	(Australia)	S.E. Melbourne	2	0	2	0–2	L2	0–0	0–2	198	210	94.29%	0.00%

Total Rounds
5 weeks

Total Games
11 games

Legend
- (RC) Reigning Champion

- Updated: 9 January 2021

=== Game log ===
2020 pre-season game log
Total: 1–2 (home: 0–0; road: 1–2)
December: 1–2 (home: 0–0; road: 1–2)

Game	Date	Team	Score	High points	High rebounds	High assists	Location Attendance	Record
1	15 December	@ Perth	L 91–83	Justinian Jessup (24)	Deng Deng (7)	Adel, Harvey, Jessup, Naar (2)	RAC Arena not announced	0–1
2	17 December	@ Perth	W 74–82	Tyler Harvey (18)	Andrew Ogilvy (7)	Emmett Naar (5)	Bendat Basketball Centre not announced	1–1
3	20 December	@ Sydney	L 98–89	Justinian Jessup (21)	Deng Deng (9)	Tyler Harvey (4)	Qudos Bank Arena closed event	1–2

== Regular season ==
=== Ladder ===
Pos	2020–21 NBL season											
Pos	Team	Pld	W	L	PCT	Last 5	Streak	Home	Away	PF	PA	PP
1	Melbourne United	36	28	8	77.78%	4–1	W3	14–4	14–4	3189	2956	107.88%
2	Perth Wildcats	36	25	11	69.44%	3–2	L2	13–5	12–6	3133	2900	108.03%
3	Illawarra Hawks	36	20	16	55.56%	4–1	L1	11–7	9–9	2962	2954	100.27%
4	S.E. Melbourne Phoenix	36	19	17	52.78%	2–3	L1	9–9	10–8	3217	3124	102.98%
5	Sydney Kings	36	19	17	52.78%	4–1	W3	11–7	8–10	3112	3087	100.81%
6	Brisbane Bullets	36	18	18	50.00%	4–1	W1	9–9	9–9	3204	3274	97.86%
7	Adelaide 36ers	36	13	23	36.11%	0–5	L7	10–8	3–15	2985	3156	94.58%
8	New Zealand Breakers	36	12	24	33.33%	2–3	L1	8–10	4–14	2937	3021	97.22%
9	Cairns Taipans	36	8	28	22.22%	1–4	L2	6–12	2–16	2940	3207	91.67%

Updated to match(es) played on 9 June 2021. Source: NBL.com.au

=== Ladder progression ===
- Numbers highlighted in green indicate that the team finished the round inside the top four.
- Numbers highlighted in blue indicates the team finished first on the ladder in that round.
- Numbers highlighted in red indicates the team finished last place on the ladder in that round.

2020–21 NBL season
Team	1	2	3	4	5	NBL Cup				10	11	12	13	14	15	16	17	18	19	20	21
Team	1	2	3	4	5	6	7	8	9	10	11	12	13	14	15	16	17	18	19	20	21
Adelaide 36ers	3	5	3	3	3	4	6	5	7	7	7	7	7	7	7	7	7	7	7	7	7
Brisbane Bullets	6	9	5	6	6	7	5	4	5	5	6	6	5	6	6	6	6	6	6	6	6
Cairns Taipans	4	7	8	8	8	8	9	9	9	9	9	9	9	9	9	9	9	9	9	9	9
Illawarra Hawks	2	3	1	2	2	2	4	3	3	4	3	5	4	5	5	5	5	4	4	3	3
Melbourne United	1	1	2	1	1	1	1	1	1	2	2	2	1	1	1	1	1	1	1	1	1
New Zealand Breakers	–	8	9	9	9	9	8	8	8	8	8	8	8	8	8	8	8	8	8	8	8
Perth Wildcats	–	2	4	7	7	3	2	2	2	1	1	1	2	2	2	2	2	2	2	2	2
S.E. Melbourne Phoenix	7	6	6	4	4	5	3	7	4	3	4	3	3	3	4	4	4	3	3	4	4
Sydney Kings	5	4	7	5	5	6	7	6	6	6	5	4	6	4	3	3	3	5	5	5	5

=== Game log ===
2020–21 game log
Total: 20–16 (home: 11–7; road: 9–9)
January: 4–0 (home: 0–0; road: 4–0)

Game	Date	Team	Score	High points	High rebounds	High assists	Location Attendance	Record
1	16 January	@ Brisbane	W 84–90	Sam Froling (19)	Cameron Bairstow (9)	Justin Simon (5)	Nissan Arena; 1,746	1–0
2	18 January	@ Cairns	W 76–92	Tyler Harvey (25)	Justin Simon (12)	Tyler Harvey (7)	Cairns Pop-Up Arena; 1,808	2–0
3	21 January	@ Brisbane	W 82–90	Tyler Harvey (31)	Ogilvy, Simon (9)	Justinian Jessup (6)	Nissan Arena; 1,591	3–0
4	28 January	@ Cairns	W 70–90	Tyler Harvey (21)	Froling, Ogilvy (8)	Justin Simon (4)	Cairns Pop-Up Arena; 1,849	4–0

February: 1–2 (home: 0–1; road: 1–1)

Game	Date	Team	Score	High points	High rebounds	High assists	Location Attendance	Record
5	7 February	@ South East Melbourne	L 98–82	Deng Adel (17)	Sam Froling (11)	Adel, Naar, Simon (3)	State Basketball Centre; 2,175	4–1
6	10 February	Melbourne	L 88–91	Justinian Jessup (24)	Sam Froling (11)	Tyler Harvey (4)	WIN Entertainment Centre; 3,459	4–2
7	14 February	@ Sydney	W 82–85	Tyler Harvey (25)	Cameron Bairstow (10)	Justinian Jessup (3)	Qudos Bank Arena; 6,534	5–2

NBL Cup: 4–4 (home: 3–1; road: 1–3)

Game	Date	Team	Score	High points	High rebounds	High assists	Location Attendance	Record
8	20 February	@ Cairns	L 101–95	Tyler Harvey (24)	Sam Froling (12)	Tyler Harvey (6)	John Cain Arena; 3,711	5–3
9	22 February	New Zealand	W 102–88	Tyler Harvey (22)	Froling, Simon (6)	Tyler Harvey (4)	John Cain Arena; 2,313	6–3
10	26 February	@ Brisbane	L 97–91	Justinian Jessup (26)	Cameron Bairstow (8)	Justin Simon (4)	John Cain Arena; 809	6–4
11	28 February	@ South East Melbourne	L 93–76	Tyler Harvey (14)	Deng Adel (7)	Justinian Jessup (4)	John Cain Arena; 3,195	6–5
12	4 March	Adelaide	W 98–89	Tyler Harvey (24)	Justin Simon (9)	Tyler Harvey (6)	State Basketball Centre; 1,355	7–5
13	7 March	Perth	L 70–87	Tyler Harvey (17)	Justin Simon (7)	Justin Simon (3)	John Cain Arena; 3,696	7–6
14	11 March	@ Sydney	W 69–89	Sam Froling (20)	Bairstow, Froling (6)	Tyler Harvey (4)	John Cain Arena; 997	8–6
15	13 March	Melbourne	W 77–69	Tyler Harvey (23)	Adel, Harvey, Jessup (6)	Tyler Harvey (4)	John Cain Arena; 4,183	9–6

March: 1–2 (home: 1–0; road: 0–2)

Game	Date	Team	Score	High points	High rebounds	High assists	Location Attendance	Record
16	21 March	@ Melbourne	L 75–65	Justinian Jessup (13)	Sam Froling (11)	Adel, Harvey, Naar (2)	John Cain Arena; 2,552	9–7
17	26 March	@ Perth	L 81–70	Justinian Jessup (15)	Tyler Harvey (8)	Adel, Naar, Ogilvy (2)	RAC Arena; 10,216	9–8
18	29 March	Brisbane	W 96–72	Tyler Harvey (28)	Deng Adel (11)	Deng Adel (6)	WIN Entertainment Centre; 2,521	10–8

April: 2–6 (home: 2–3; road: 0–3)

Game	Date	Team	Score	High points	High rebounds	High assists	Location Attendance	Record
19	1 April	South East Melbourne	L 63–95	Justinian Jessup (21)	Sam Froling (11)	Harvey, Naar, Ogilvy, Simon 2	WIN Entertainment Centre; 2,602	10–9
20	3 April	@ Adelaide	L 84–72	Justinian Jessup (17)	Sam Froling (12)	Froling, Naar, Simon (3)	Adelaide Entertainment Centre; 5,686	10–10
21	7 April	Brisbane	L 82–88	Justinian Jessup (19)	Deng Deng (8)	Froling, Harvey 4	WIN Entertainment Centre; 2,426	10–11
22	9 April	South East Melbourne	W 82–80	Justinian Jessup (26)	Deng Deng (7)	Tyler Harvey (4)	WIN Entertainment Centre; 2,533	11–11
23	11 April	Cairns	W 82–80	Tyler Harvey (35)	Andrew Ogilvy (9)	Andrew Ogilvy (5)	WIN Entertainment Centre; 3,064	12–11
24	16 April	@ Perth	L 83–69	Sam Froling (15)	Sam Froling (8)	Emmett Naar (4)	RAC Arena; 11,485	12–12
25	18 April	@ Melbourne	L 87–76	Justinian Jessup (19)	Sam Froling (7)	Emmett Naar (4)	John Cain Arena; 3,794	12–13
26	24 April	Sydney	L 75–79 (OT)	Sam Froling (22)	Sam Froling (12)	Emmett Naar (12)	WIN Entertainment Centre; 3,724	12–14

May: 7–1 (home: 4–1; road: 3–0)

Game	Date	Team	Score	High points	High rebounds	High assists	Location Attendance	Record
27	3 May	@ New Zealand	W 67–75	Tyler Harvey (29)	Justin Simon (6)	Sam Froling (4)	Silverdome; 1,097	13–14
28	11 May	Adelaide	W 71–66	Tyler Harvey (23)	Deng Deng (9)	Tyler Harvey (7)	WIN Entertainment Centre; 2,036	14–14
29	15 May	New Zealand	W 73–71	Tyler Harvey (24)	Sam Froling (12)	Coenraad, Grida, Harvey, Jessup, Simon (1)	WIN Entertainment Centre; 2,456	15–14
30	18 May	Melbourne	L 87–102	Deng Deng (15)	Deng Deng (8)	Harvey, Naar (4)	WIN Entertainment Centre; 1,794	15–15
31	21 May	@ Adelaide	W 73–81	Sam Froling (19)	Deng, Froling (7)	Emmett Naar (7)	Adelaide Entertainment Centre; 6,090	16–15
32	23 May	Cairns	W 93–81	Justinian Jessup (24)	Andrew Ogilvy (11)	Tyler Harvey (9)	WIN Entertainment Centre; 2,258	17–15
33	28 May	@ New Zealand	W 73–84	Tyler Harvey (30)	Froling, Harvey, Simon (8)	Tyler Harvey (4)	Franklin Pool and Leisure Centre; 1,100	18–15
34	30 May	Adelaide	W 97–83	Tyler Harvey (23)	Harvey, Ogilvy (6)	Harvey, Naar (5)	WIN Entertainment Centre; 3,004	19–15

June: 1–1 (home: 1–1; road: 0–0)

Game	Date	Team	Score	High points	High rebounds	High assists	Location Attendance	Record
35	1 June	Perth	W 81–79	Tyler Harvey (27)	Andrew Ogilvy (7)	Harvey, Ogilvy (3)	WIN Entertainment Centre; 2,038	20–15
36	3 June	Sydney	L 73–79	Froling, Naar, White (12)	Sam Froling (7)	Emmett Naar (6)	WIN Entertainment Centre; 3,217	20–16

== Postseason ==
2021 playoff game log
Total: 1–2 (home: 0–1; road: 1–1)
Semifinals: 1–2 (home: 0–1; road: 1–1)

Game	Date	Team	Score	High points	High rebounds	High assists	Location Attendance	Series
1	10 June	@ Perth	W 72–74	Justinian Jessup (17)	Justin Simon (9)	Emmett Naar (5)	RAC Arena; 7,662	1–0
2	12 June	Perth	L 71–79	Tyler Harvey (24)	Coenraad, Froling (5)	Justin Simon (5)	WIN Entertainment Centre; 5,217	1–1
3	14 June	@ Perth	L 79–71	Sam Froling (14)	Justin Simon (11)	Justin Simon (4)	RAC Arena; 8,986	1–2

== Awards ==
=== Player of the Week ===
Round 1, Justin Simon

Round 5, Tyler Harvey

Round 13, Tyler Harvey

Round 20, Tyler Harvey

== See also ==
- 2020–21 NBL season
- Illawarra Hawks
