= 2020–21 Sydney Kings season =

Australian basketball club season

- Head coach: (Australia) Adam Forde
- Co-captains: (Australia) Daniel Kickert (United States) Casper Ware
- Arena: Sydney SuperDome

NBL results
- Record: 19–17 (52.8%)
- Ladder: 5th
- Finals finish: Did not qualify
- Stats at NBL.com.au

Cup results
- Record: 4–4 (50%)
- Ladder: 5th
- Cup finish: N/A

The 2020–21 NBL season was the 32nd season for the Sydney Kings in the NBL.

== Roster ==
=== Squad ===
Note: Flags indicate national team eligibility at FIBA-sanctioned events. Players may hold other non-FIBA nationalities not displayed.

2020–21 Sydney Kings roster
Players
Coaches

Pos.	No.	Nat.	Name	Ht.	Wt.	Age
C	1	(Australia)	Hunter, Jordan	2.08 m (6 ft 10 in)	104 kg (229 lb)	29 – 20 August 1997
G	2	(Australia)	Hutchison, Lochlan (DP)	1.88 m (6 ft 2 in)	85 kg (187 lb)	26 – 29 October 1999
G	3	(Australia)	Vasiljevic, Dejan (injured)	1.91 m (6 ft 3 in)	86 kg (190 lb)	29 – 26 April 1997
G	5	(Australia)	Glover, Angus (injured)	1.93 m (6 ft 4 in)	87 kg (192 lb)	28 – 8 September 1998
G	7	(Australia)	Bruce, Shaun	1.90 m (6 ft 3 in)	82 kg (181 lb)	35 – 13 January 1991
G/F	8	(Australia)	Newley, Brad	1.98 m (6 ft 6 in)	94 kg (207 lb)	41 – 18 February 1985
F	9	(Australia)	Moller, Craig	2.03 m (6 ft 8 in)	93 kg (205 lb)	32 – 22 August 1994
F	10	(Australia)	Cooks, Xavier	2.03 m (6 ft 8 in)	84 kg (185 lb)	31 – 19 September 1995
F	12	(United States)	Martin, Jarell (I)	2.08 m (6 ft 10 in)	108 kg (238 lb)	32 – 24 May 1994
F	13	(New Zealand)	Vodanovich, Tom	2.01 m (6 ft 7 in)	104 kg (229 lb)	32 – 28 July 1994
F/C	14	(Australia)	Kickert, Daniel (C)	2.08 m (6 ft 10 in)	109 kg (240 lb)	43 – 29 May 1983
F/C	15	(Australia)	Woodhill, Archie (DP)	2.06 m (6 ft 9 in)	95 kg (209 lb)	24 – 15 November 2001
G	22	(United States)	Ware, Casper (I & C)	1.78 m (5 ft 10 in)	79 kg (174 lb)	36 – 17 January 1990
F	25	(Australia)	Galloway, Yalin (DP)	2.01 m (6 ft 7 in)	82 kg (181 lb)	23 – 21 December 2002
G	30	(Australia)	Kernich-Drew, Dexter	1.99 m (6 ft 6 in)	83 kg (183 lb)	34 – 16 October 1991
G	97	(Australia)	Weeks, Jarrad	1.83 m (6 ft 0 in)	80 kg (176 lb)	37 – 11 July 1989

Head coach

- (Australia) Adam Forde

Assistant coach(es)

- (Canada) James Duncan
- (Australia) Sam Gruggen
- (United States) Kevin Lisch
- (Australia) Lachlan Lonergan

Legend

- (C) Team captain
- (DP) Development player
- (IN) Inactive
- (I) Import player
- (TP) Training player
- (NS) Next Star player
- Injured

- Roster
Updated: 5 May 2021

== Pre-season ==
=== Ladder ===
2020–21 NBL pre-season ladder
Ladder
Information

Pos.	Nat.	Name	Pld.	W.	L.	Last 5	Streak	Home	Away	For	Against	Pts %	Win %
1	(Australia)	Melbourne	1	1	0	1–0	W1	0–0	1–0	97	81	119.75%	100.00%
2	(Australia)	Sydney	1	1	0	1–0	W1	1–0	0–0	98	89	110.11%	100.00%
3	(Australia)	Adelaide	3	2	1	2–1	L1	2–0	0–1	276	225	122.67%	66.67%
4	(Australia)	Perth (RC)	2	1	1	1–1	L1	1–1	0–0	165	165	100.00%	50.00%
5	(Australia)	Cairns	2	1	1	1–1	W1	1–1	0–0	177	185	95.68%	50.00%
6	(Australia)	Brisbane	4	2	2	2–2	W2	2–0	0–2	347	378	91.80%	50.00%
7	(Australia)	Illawarra	3	1	2	1–2	L1	0–0	1–2	254	263	96.58%	33.33%
8	(Australia)	S.E. Melbourne	2	0	2	0–2	L2	0–0	0–2	198	210	94.29%	0.00%

Total Rounds
5 weeks

Total Games
11 games

Legend
- (RC) Reigning Champion

- Updated: 9 January 2021

=== Game log ===
2020 pre-season game log
Total: 1–0 (Home: 1–0; Road: 0–0)
December: 1–0 (home: 1–0; road: 0–0)

Game	Date	Team	Score	High points	High rebounds	High assists	Location Attendance	Record
1	20 December	The Hawks	W 98–89	Shaun Bruce (14)	Craig Moller (8)	Casper Ware (4)	Qudos Bank Arena closed event	1–0

== Regular season ==
=== Ladder ===
Pos	2020–21 NBL season											
Pos	Team	Pld	W	L	PCT	Last 5	Streak	Home	Away	PF	PA	PP
1	Melbourne United	36	28	8	77.78%	4–1	W3	14–4	14–4	3189	2956	107.88%
2	Perth Wildcats	36	25	11	69.44%	3–2	L2	13–5	12–6	3133	2900	108.03%
3	Illawarra Hawks	36	20	16	55.56%	4–1	L1	11–7	9–9	2962	2954	100.27%
4	S.E. Melbourne Phoenix	36	19	17	52.78%	2–3	L1	9–9	10–8	3217	3124	102.98%
5	Sydney Kings	36	19	17	52.78%	4–1	W3	11–7	8–10	3112	3087	100.81%
6	Brisbane Bullets	36	18	18	50.00%	4–1	W1	9–9	9–9	3204	3274	97.86%
7	Adelaide 36ers	36	13	23	36.11%	0–5	L7	10–8	3–15	2985	3156	94.58%
8	New Zealand Breakers	36	12	24	33.33%	2–3	L1	8–10	4–14	2937	3021	97.22%
9	Cairns Taipans	36	8	28	22.22%	1–4	L2	6–12	2–16	2940	3207	91.67%

Updated to match(es) played on 9 June 2021. Source: NBL.com.au

=== Ladder progression ===
- Numbers highlighted in green indicate that the team finished the round inside the top four.
- Numbers highlighted in blue indicates the team finished first on the ladder in that round.
- Numbers highlighted in red indicates the team finished last place on the ladder in that round.

2020–21 NBL season
Team	1	2	3	4	5	NBL Cup				10	11	12	13	14	15	16	17	18	19	20	21
Team	1	2	3	4	5	6	7	8	9	10	11	12	13	14	15	16	17	18	19	20	21
Adelaide 36ers	3	5	3	3	3	4	6	5	7	7	7	7	7	7	7	7	7	7	7	7	7
Brisbane Bullets	6	9	5	6	6	7	5	4	5	5	6	6	5	6	6	6	6	6	6	6	6
Cairns Taipans	4	7	8	8	8	8	9	9	9	9	9	9	9	9	9	9	9	9	9	9	9
Illawarra Hawks	2	3	1	2	2	2	4	3	3	4	3	5	4	5	5	5	5	4	4	3	3
Melbourne United	1	1	2	1	1	1	1	1	1	2	2	2	1	1	1	1	1	1	1	1	1
New Zealand Breakers	–	8	9	9	9	9	8	8	8	8	8	8	8	8	8	8	8	8	8	8	8
Perth Wildcats	–	2	4	7	7	3	2	2	2	1	1	1	2	2	2	2	2	2	2	2	2
S.E. Melbourne Phoenix	7	6	6	4	4	5	3	7	4	3	4	3	3	3	4	4	4	3	3	4	4
Sydney Kings	5	4	7	5	5	6	7	6	6	6	5	4	6	4	3	3	3	5	5	5	5

=== Game log ===
2020–21 game log
Total: 19–17 (Home: 11–7; Road: 8–10)
January: 1–3 (home: 0–0; road: 1–3)

Game	Date	Team	Score	High points	High rebounds	High assists	Location Attendance	Record
1	16 January	@ Cairns	L 87–86	Casper Ware (18)	Jarell Martin (8)	Shaun Bruce (4)	Cairns Pop-Up Arena; 1,919	0–1
2	23 January	@ Cairns	W 91–99	Martin, Ware (22)	Jarell Martin (10)	Bruce, Moller (4)	Cairns Pop-Up Arena; 1,930	1–1
3	26 January	@ Brisbane	L 90–87	Jarell Martin (26)	Jarell Martin (11)	Bruce, Louzada, Moller, Ware (3)	Nissan Arena; 3,406	1–2
4	30 January	@ Adelaide	L 85–80	Dejan Vasiljevic (28)	Craig Moller (9)	Casper Ware (6)	Adelaide Entertainment Centre; 7,087	1–3

February : 2–1 (home: 1–1; road: 1–0)

Game	Date	Team	Score	High points	High rebounds	High assists	Location Attendance	Record
5	6 February	@ Adelaide	W 75–94	Casper Ware (27)	Jordan Hunter (11)	Shaun Bruce (7)	Adelaide Entertainment Centre; 7,317	2–3
6	12 February	New Zealand	W 84–74	Casper Ware (22)	Martin, Newley (6)	Shaun Bruce (4)	Qudos Bank Arena; 5,833	3–3
7	14 February	Illawarra	L 82–85	Casper Ware (21)	Craig Moller (8)	Shaun Bruce (9)	Qudos Bank Arena; 6,534	3–4

NBL Cup: 4–4 (home: 2–2; road: 2–2)

Game	Date	Team	Score	High points	High rebounds	High assists	Location Attendance	Record
8	21 February	Adelaide	W 94–77	Casper Ware (23)	Jordan Hunter (9)	Brad Newley (4)	John Cain Arena; 2,566	4–4
9	23 February	Perth	L 106–113	Casper Ware (34)	Casper Ware (5)	Casper Ware (4)	John Cain Arena; 1,079	4–5
10	25 February	New Zealand	96–78	Jordan Hunter (24)	Dejan Vasiljevic (10)	Casper Ware (5)	John Cain Arena; 1,991	5–5
11	27 February	@ Melbourne	L 83–80	Dejan Vasiljevic (22)	Brad Newley (8)	Casper Ware (5)	John Cain Arena; 4,206	5–6
12	4 March	@ Cairns	L 96–92	Dejan Vasiljevic (32)	Jordan Hunter (6)	Moller, Ware (4)	State Basketball Centre; 1,355	5–7
13	6 March	@ South East Melbourne	W 85–91	Dejan Vasiljevic (19)	Casper Ware (10)	Casper Ware (6)	John Cain Arena; 3,708	6–7
14	11 March	Illawarra	L 69–89	Dejan Vasiljevic (12)	Craig Moller (6)	Bruce, Moller (4)	John Cain Arena; 997	6–8
15	13 March	@ Brisbane	W 108–119	Casper Ware (25)	Jordan Hunter (8)	Casper Ware (10)	John Cain Arena; 4,183	7–8

March: 2–1 (home: 2–1; road: 0–0)

Game	Date	Team	Score	High points	High rebounds	High assists	Location Attendance	Record
16	19 March	Melbourne	W 103–75	Jordan Hunter (18)	Martin, Moller (6)	Moller, Ware (6)	Qudos Bank Arena; 5,089	8–8
17	21 March	Cairns	W 75–73	Martin, Ware (16)	Craig Moller (8)	Louzada, Martin, Moller, Vasiljevic, Ware (2)	Qudos Bank Arena; 5,187	9–8
18	28 March	Perth	L 65–89	Jarell Martin (18)	Craig Moller (7)	Casper Ware (6)	Qudos Bank Arena; 5,067	9–9

April: 5–3 (home: 3–2; road: 2–1)

Game	Date	Team	Score	High points	High rebounds	High assists	Location Attendance	Record
19	1 April	@ Perth	L 95–89	Jarell Martin (27)	Jarell Martin (11)	Didi Louzada (4)	RAC Arena; 10,123	9–10
20	3 April	Brisbane	W 90–71	Craig Moller (20)	Jarell Martin (10)	Casper Ware (9)	Qudos Bank Arena; 5,439	10–10
21	8 April	Perth	L 69–73	Casper Ware (20)	Jordan Hunter (13)	Bruce, Ware (3)	Qudos Bank Arena; 4,115	10–11
22	11 April	South East Melbourne	L 84–98	Jarell Martin (23)	Jordan Hunter (9)	Didi Louzada (7)	Qudos Bank Arena; 4,236	10–12
23	15 April	South East Melbourne	W 97–90	Didi Louzada (28)	Didi Louzada (8)	Casper Ware (6)	Qudos Bank Arena; 4,476	11–12
24	17 April	Cairns	W 89–84	Casper Ware (40)	Jordan Hunter (8)	Shaun Bruce (4)	Qudos Bank Arena; 5,214	12–12
25	22 April	@ South East Melbourne	W 81–101	Hunter, Ware (19)	Jordan Hunter (10)	Casper Ware (5)	John Cain Arena; 1,268	13–12
26	24 April	@ Illawarra	W 75–79 (OT)	Casper Ware (18)	Shaun Bruce (13)	Casper Ware (4)	WIN Entertainment Centre; 3,724	14–12

May: 3–5 (home: 2–1; road: 1–4)

Game	Date	Team	Score	High points	High rebounds	High assists	Location Attendance	Record
27	2 May	@ Melbourne	L 103–78	Casper Ware (25)	Craig Moller (11)	Shaun Bruce (5)	John Cain Arena; 2,214	14–13
28	9 May	Adelaide	L 88–97 (OT)	Jarell Martin (25)	Jordan Hunter (9)	Casper Ware (8)	Qudos Bank Arena; 4,063	14–14
29	13 May	@ Brisbane	L 93–70	Jordan Hunter (15)	Hunter, Moller (11)	Casper Ware (3)	Nissan Arena; 1,374	14–15
30	16 May	Adelaide	W 85–75	Jarell Martin (20)	Craig Moller (11)	Casper Ware (12)	Qudos Bank Arena; 5,078	15–15
31	20 May	@ New Zealand	L 89–81	Casper Ware (20)	Jarell Martin (6)	Bruce, Ware (3)	The Trusts Arena; 3,800	15–16
32	22 May	@ New Zealand	W 76–81	Jarell Martin (29)	Jarell Martin (9)	Shaun Bruce (5)	TSB Stadium; 2,066	16–16
33	27 May	@ Perth	L 81–67	Jarell Martin (20)	Jordan Hunter (9)	Xavier Cooks (3)	RAC Arena; 10,650	16–17
34	29 May	Melbourne	W 100–98 (2OT)	Shaun Bruce (21)	Craig Moller (12)	Shaun Bruce (7)	Qudos Bank Arena; 6,238	17–17

June: 2–0 (home: 1–0; road: 1–0)

Game	Date	Team	Score	High points	High rebounds	High assists	Location Attendance	Record
35	3 June	@ Illawarra	W 73–79	Jarell Martin (23)	Cooks, Martin (10)	Casper Ware (8)	WIN Entertainment Centre; 3,217	18–17
36	5 June	Brisbane	W 83–82	Jarell Martin (28)	Xavier Cooks (7)	Xavier Cooks (5)	Qudos Bank Arena; 9,267	19–17

== Transactions ==
=== Re-signed ===
Player	Signed
Craig Moller	3 June
Shaun Bruce	15 June
Xavier Cooks	7 July
Casper Ware	27 August
Daniel Kickert	3 September

=== Additions ===
Player	Signed	Former team
Dejan Vasiljevic	17 July	Miami
Angus Glover	20 July	Illawarra Hawks
Jarell Martin	2 December	Rio Grande Valley Vipers
Tom Vodanovich	2 January	BBC Telstar Hesper
Jaylin Galloway	14 January	Australian Institute of Sport
Lochlan Hutchison	14 January	Sutherland Sharks
Archie Woodhill	14 January	Australian Institute of Sport
Dexter Kernich-Drew	5 February	Melbourne United
Jarrad Weeks	5 May	New Zealand Breakers

=== Subtractions ===
Player	Reason left	New team
Kevin Lisch	Retired	Sydney Kings (assistant)
Jae'Sean Tate	Released	Houston Rockets
Andrew Bogut	Retired	N/A
Lucas Walker	Retired	N/A
Deshon Taylor	Free agent	Canterbury Rams
Didi Louzada	Released	New Orleans Pelicans

== Awards ==
=== Player of the Week ===
Round 15, Jordan Hunter

== See also ==
- 2020–21 NBL season
- Sydney Kings
