= Brendan Teys =

Australian basketball player

Brisbane Capitals
- Position: Guard
- League: NBL1 North

Personal information
- Born: 22 February 1990 (age 36) Brisbane, Australia
- Listed height: 192 cm (6 ft 4 in)
- Listed weight: 86 kg (190 lb)

Career information
- Playing career: 2007–present

Career history
- 2007–2008: South West Metro Pirates
- 2009–2012: Gold Coast Blaze
- 2012: Townsville Crocodiles
- 2013–2021: Adelaide 36ers
- 2017: South West Metro Pirates
- 2019: Forestville Eagles
- 2021–2025: South West Metro Pirates
- 2026–present: Brisbane Capitals

Brendan William Teys (born 22 February 1990) is an Australian professional basketball player for the Brisbane Capitals of the NBL1 North.

== Professional career ==
=== Early career (2008–2013) ===
Following a junior basketball career with the South West Metro Pirates of the Queensland Basketball League, Teys signed with his hometown Brisbane Bullets of the NBL as a development player in 2008 but the club folded before the season commenced. He followed former Bullets coach Joey Wright to the Gold Coast Blaze, where he played sparingly over three seasons. After the Blaze folded before the start of the 2012–13 NBL season, Teys played with the Townsville Crocodiles for two games in 2012.

=== Adelaide 36ers (2013–2021) ===
Teys was encouraged by Wright to sign with the Adelaide 36ers following the latter's appointment as head coach for the 2013–14 NBL season. He scored a career-high 23 points in a November 2014 game against the New Zealand Breakers. On 9 July 2015, the 36ers re-signed Teys on a three-year deal. Teys was named captain of the 36ers for the 2017–18 NBL season. On 1 August 2018, he re-signed with the 36ers on a one-year deal. Teys re-signed with the 36ers on a two-year deal in the 2019 off-season. He was appointed 36ers co-captain alongside Kevin White for the 2019–20 NBL season. Teys was chosen as a 36ers co-captain alongside teammates Daniel Johnson and Daniel Dillon for the 2020–21 NBL season.

=== NBL1 North (2022–present) ===
Teys joined the South West Metro Pirates of the NBL1 North for the 2021 season. He averaged 19.0 points, 6.1 rebounds and 4.0 assists per game. Teys rejoined the Pirates for the 2023 NBL1 Central season. He moved to the Brisbane Capitals in 2026.

== Personal life ==
Teys has two daughters with his wife, Lori, who is an Indigenous Australian.
