= 2020–21 Melbourne United season =

- NBL champions
- Regular season champions
- Head coach: (Australia) Dean Vickerman
- Co-captains: (Australia) Chris Goulding (Australia) Mitch McCarron
- Arena: John Cain Arena

NBL results
- Record: 28–8 (77.8%)
- Ladder: 1st
- Finals finish: Champions (6th title) (Defeated Wildcats 3–0)
- Stats at NBL.com.au

Cup results
- Record: 4–4 (50%)
- Ladder: 4th
- Cup finish: N/A

Player records
- Points: (Australia) Landale 16.4
- Rebounds: (Australia) Landale 7.9
- Assists: (Australia) McCarron 5.1
- Efficiency: (Australia) Andersen 67%
- All statistics correct as of 6 June 2021.

The 2020–21 NBL season was the 38th season for Melbourne United in the NBL, and the 7th under the banner of Melbourne United.

== Roster ==
Note: Flags indicate national team eligibility at FIBA-sanctioned events. Players may hold other non-FIBA nationalities not displayed.

2020–21 Melbourne United roster
Players
Coaches

Pos.	No.	Nat.	Name	Ht.	Wt.	Age
C	0	(South Sudan)	Lual-Acuil, Jo	2.13 m (7 ft 0 in)	102 kg (225 lb)	31 – 26 April 1994
G	5	(Australia)	Short, Sam (DP)	1.95 m (6 ft 5 in)	78 kg (172 lb)	28 – 11 February 1998
G	10	(Australia)	McCarron, Mitch (C)	1.89 m (6 ft 2 in)	97 kg (214 lb)	33 – 30 June 1992
F/C	13	(Australia)	Andersen, David	2.11 m (6 ft 11 in)	113 kg (249 lb)	45 – 23 June 1980
F	14	(Australia)	White, Jack (injured)	2.01 m (6 ft 7 in)	101 kg (223 lb)	28 – 5 August 1997
G	18	(Japan)	Baba, Yudai (SRP)	1.96 m (6 ft 5 in)	90 kg (198 lb)	30 – 7 November 1995
F	20	(Australia)	Barlow, David	2.05 m (6 ft 9 in)	97 kg (214 lb)	42 – 22 October 1983
F	22	(Australia)	Peatling, Mason (DP)	2.03 m (6 ft 8 in)	100 kg (220 lb)	28 – 31 March 1997
G	30	(Australia)	McDaniel, Sam	1.98 m (6 ft 6 in)	95 kg (209 lb)	30 – 9 December 1995
F	32	(United States)	Hopson, Scotty (I)	2.01 m (6 ft 7 in)	104 kg (229 lb)	36 – 8 August 1989
F	34	(Australia)	Landale, Jock	2.11 m (6 ft 11 in)	116 kg (256 lb)	30 – 25 October 1995
G	43	(Australia)	Goulding, Chris (C)	1.92 m (6 ft 4 in)	92 kg (203 lb)	37 – 24 October 1988
G	51	(New Zealand)	Ili, Shea	1.83 m (6 ft 0 in)	85 kg (187 lb)	33 – 6 October 1992

Head coach

- (Australia) Dean Vickerman

Assistant coach(es)

- (Australia) Rhys Carter
- (Australia) Darryl McDonald
- (Australia) Justin Schueller

Strength & conditioning coach(es)

- (Australia) Nik Popovic

Team manager

- (Australia) Stephan Semerci

Legend

- (C) Team captain
- (DP) Development player
- (IN) Inactive
- (I) Import player
- (SRP) Special restricted player
- (NS) Next Star player
- Injured

- Roster
Updated: 8 May 2021

== Transactions ==
=== Signings ===
- Mitch McCarron, Shea Ili, Casey Prather, Jo Lual-Acuil and Sam Short all remained with the club after they previously signed multiple season contracts. Head Coach Dean Vickerman and assistant coach Ross McMains also remained with the club under their multiple season contracts.
- On 15 July 2020, United signed their first new contract for the season. Jack White of Duke University signed a three-season deal with the club.
- On 17 July 2020, guard Chris Goulding re-signed with the club on a three-season deal, which will take his total seasons with the club to eight.
- On 19 July 2020, United signed Yudai Baba on a one-season Special Restricted Player deal.
- On 22 July 2020, David Barlow also re-signed with the club on a new one-season deal.
- On 24 July 2020, Mason Peatling was signed to a three-season deal, with him being assigned as a development player for the first season.
- On 14 August 2020, Sam McDaniel was re-signed for his third season with the club on a one-season deal.
- On 20 August 2020, United released Casey Prather from the final season of his contract.
- On 21 August 2020, United also released assistant coach Ross McMains from his contract.
- On 30 November 2020, Scotty Hopson signed a one-year deal with the club, filling United’s first Import slot.
- On 10 December 2020, Jock Landale signed one-year deal with the club.
- On 9 February 2021, following multiple injuries Dillon Stith was added to the squad as an injury replacement player.
- On 13 March 2021, C. J. Asuncion-Byrd was signed as the injury replacement player for Baba.
- On 8 April, David Andersen signed as the injury replacement player for White.

== Game log ==
=== Pre-season ===
2020 pre-season game log
Total: 1–0 (Home: 0–0; Road: 1–0)
December: 1–0 (home: 0–0; road: 1–0)

Game	Date	Team	Score	High points	High rebounds	High assists	Location Attendance	Record
1	31 December	@ Cairns	W 81–97	Chris Goulding (17)	Jock Landale (8)	Mitch McCarron (5)	Cairns Pop-Up Arena not announced	1–0

=== Regular season ===
2020–21 game log
Total: 28–8 (Home: 14–4; Road: 14–4)
January: 3–0 (home: 1–0; road: 2–0)

Game	Date	Team	Score	High points	High rebounds	High assists	Location Attendance	Record
1	15 January	@ Adelaide	W 65–89	Goulding, Lual-Acuil (16)	Jo Lual-Acuil (12)	Scotty Hopson (4)	Adelaide Entertainment Centre; 6,539	1–0
2	25 January	@ Cairns	W 85–87	Jock Landale (19)	Jo Lual-Acuil (11)	Ili, McCarron (4)	Cairns Pop-Up Arena; 1,896	2–0
3	31 January	S.E. Melbourne	W 96–90	Jack White (22)	Jock Landale (7)	Mitch McCarron (6)	Bendigo Stadium; 2,000	3–0

February: 3–0 (home: 1–0; road: 2–0)

Game	Date	Team	Score	High points	High rebounds	High assists	Location Attendance	Record
4	5 February	@ Brisbane	W 96–109	Chris Goulding (27)	Jock Landale (13)	Mitch McCarron (8)	Nissan Arena; 2,234	4–0
5	7 February	Perth	W 75–71	Jock Landale (16)	Jack White (8)	Scotty Hopson (6)	Bendigo Stadium; 1,953	5–0
6	10 February	@ Illawarra	W 88–91	Scotty Hopson (21)	Scotty Hopson (9)	Mitch McCarron (7)	WIN Entertainment Centre; 3,459	6–0

NBL Cup: 4–4 (home: 2–2; road: 2–2)

Game	Date	Team	Score	High points	High rebounds	High assists	Location Attendance	Record
7	20 February	Perth	L 85–89	Jock Landale (20)	Jock Landale (10)	Hopson, Landale (4)	John Cain Arena; 3,711	6–1
8	22 February	Cairns	W 88–81	Jock Landale (18)	Jock Landale (11)	Mitch McCarron (7)	John Cain Arena; 2,313	7–1
9	25 February	@ Adelaide	W 73–82	Mitch McCarron (18)	McCarron (10)	Scotty Hopson (4)	John Cain Arena; 1,991	8–1
10	27 February	Sydney	W 83–80	Jock Landale (20)	Jo Lual-Acuil (10)	Mitch McCarron (6)	John Cain Arena; 4,206	9–1
11	5 March	@ New Zealand	W 84–87	Jock Landale (23)	Mitch McCarron (7)	Mitch McCarron (7)	John Cain Arena; 3,421	10–1
12	7 March	Brisbane	L 88–96	Chris Goulding (21)	Jock Landale (11)	Baba, Ili (3)	John Cain Arena; 3,696	10–2
13	10 March	@ S.E. Melbourne	L 97–92 (OT)	Goulding, Landale (22)	Jo Lual-Acuil (9)	Shea Ili (6)	John Cain Arena; 3,675	10–3
14	13 March	@ Illawarra	L 77–69	Mitch McCarron (16)	Jock Landale (8)	Landale, McCarron (4)	John Cain Arena; 4,183	10–4

March: 3–1 (home: 1–0; road: 2–1)

Game	Date	Team	Score	High points	High rebounds	High assists	Location Attendance	Record
15	19 March	@ Sydney	L 103–75	Jock Landale (18)	Ili, Landale (7)	Chris Goulding (6)	Qudos Bank Arena; 5,089	10–5
16	21 March	Illawarra	W 75–65	Jock Landale (19)	Mitch McCarron (11)	Goulding, McCarron (5)	John Cain Arena; 2,552	11–5
17	25 March	@ New Zealand	W 79–82	Ili, McCarron (16)	Mitch McCarron (7)	Mitch McCarron (7)	Bendigo Stadium; 1,150	12–5
18	27 March	@ S.E. Melbourne	W 60–80	Chris Goulding (25)	Mason Peatling (12)	Mitch McCarron (6)	John Cain Arena; 3,370	13–5

April: 7–0 (home: 6–0; road: 1–0)

Game	Date	Team	Score	High points	High rebounds	High assists	Location Attendance	Record
19	2 April	Cairns	W 95–85	Jock Landale (20)	Jock Landale (11)	Hopson, McCarron (4)	John Cain Arena; 3,673	14–5
20	4 April	@ Cairns	W 73–83	Chris Goulding (15)	Landale, Lual-Acuil (10)	Mitch McCarron (7)	Cairns Pop-Up Arena; 1,847	15–5
21	10 April	New Zealand	W 84–78	Scotty Hopson (19)	Jock Landale (11)	Mitch McCarron (5)	John Cain Arena; 2,717	16–5
22	12 April	Brisbane	W 98–89	Jock Landale (23)	Jock Landale (13)	Mitch McCarron (12)	John Cain Arena; 3,422	17–5
23	18 April	Illawarra	W 87–76	Jo Lual-Acuil (15)	Jock Landale (11)	Jock Landale (5)	John Cain Arena; 3,794	18–5
24	24 April	Adelaide	W 92–78	Mitch McCarron (21)	Landale, Lual-Acuil (10)	Mitch McCarron (5)	John Cain Arena; 3,034	19–5
25	28 April	New Zealand	W 90–76	Scotty Hopson (25)	Jo Lual-Acuil (9)	Barlow, Goulding, McCarron (3)	John Cain Arena; 2,173	20–5

May: 6–3 (home: 2–2; road: 4–1)

Game	Date	Team	Score	High points	High rebounds	High assists	Location Attendance	Record
26	2 May	Sydney	W 103–78	Chris Goulding (21)	Jo Lual-Acuil (9)	Mitch McCarron (8)	John Cain Arena; 2,214	21–5
27	5 May	Perth	L 69–82	Jock Landale (11)	Jo Lual-Acuil (10)	Mitch McCarron (5)	John Cain Arena; 2,011	21–6
28	8 May	@ S.E. Melbourne	W 82–93	Jock Landale (27)	Jock Landale (11)	Yudai Baba (3)	John Cain Arena; 3,899	22–6
29	13 May	@ Perth	W 91–99	Chris Goulding (26)	Jock Landale (7)	Mitch McCarron (6)	RAC Arena; 9,987	23–6
30	16 May	S.E. Melbourne	L 83–94	Jock Landale (19)	Mitch McCarron (7)	Mitch McCarron 6	John Cain Arena; 3,460	23–7
31	18 May	@ Illawarra	W 87–102	Chris Goulding (25)	Jock Landale (10)	Scotty Hopson (8)	WIN Entertainment Centre; 1,794	24–7
32	24 May	@ Brisbane	W 88–99	Chris Goulding (22)	McCarron, Peatling (6)	Mitch McCarron (7)	Nissan Arena; 1,614	25–7
33	29 May	@ Sydney	L 100–98 (2OT)	Jock Landale (23)	Jock Landale (12)	Mitch McCarron (9)	Qudos Bank Arena; 6,238	25–8
34	31 May	Cairns	W 101–76	Jock Landale (19)	Mason Peatling (11)	Scotty Hopson (5)	Qudos Bank Arena closed event	26–8

June: 2–0 (home: 1–0; road: 1–0)

Game	Date	Team	Score	High points	High rebounds	High assists	Location Attendance	Record
35	4 June	@ Perth	W 64–78	Jo Lual-Acuil (16)	Mitch McCarron (6)	Mitch McCarron (5)	RAC Arena; 12,185	27–8
36	6 June	Adelaide	W 102–80	Hopson, Landale (19)	Jock Landale (9)	Shea Ili (8)	Adelaide Entertainment Centre; 1,817	28–8

=== Postseason ===
2021 finals game log
Total: 5–1 (Home: 3–0; Road: 2–1)
Semifinals: 2–1 (Home: 2–0; Road: 0–1)

Game	Date	Team	Score	High points	High rebounds	High assists	Location Attendance	Record
1	11 June	S.E. Melbourne	W 96–78	Jock Landale (26)	Mason Peatling (6)	Mitch McCarron (5)	Qudos Bank Arena; 500	1–0
2	13 June	@ S.E. Melbourne	L 90–79	Scotty Hopson (19)	Lual-Acuil, Peatling (7)	McCarron, Lual-Acuil, Peatling (4)	Qudos Bank Arena; 500	1–1
3	15 June	S.E. Melbourne	W 84–74	Jock Landale (27)	Landale, McCarron (8)	Mitch McCarron (6)	Qudos Bank Arena; 500	2–1

NBL Finals: 3–0 (Home: 0–0; Road: 3–0)

Game	Date	Team	Score	High points	High rebounds	High assists	Location Attendance	Record
1	18 June	@ Perth	W 70–73	Chris Goulding (23)	Mitch McCarron (11)	Mitch McCarron (6)	RAC Arena; 9,951	1–0
2	20 June	@ Perth	W 74–83	Chris Goulding (21)	Jock Landale (17)	Mitch McCarron (7)	RAC Arena; 11,097	2–0
3	25 June	Perth	W 81–76	Jock Landale (15)	Jock Landale (9)	Mitch McCarron (5)	John Cain Arena; 4,507	3–0

== Ladder ==
Pos	2020–21 NBL season											
Pos	Team	Pld	W	L	PCT	Last 5	Streak	Home	Away	PF	PA	PP
1	Melbourne United	36	28	8	77.78%	4–1	W3	14–4	14–4	3189	2956	107.88%
2	Perth Wildcats	36	25	11	69.44%	3–2	L2	13–5	12–6	3133	2900	108.03%
3	Illawarra Hawks	36	20	16	55.56%	4–1	L1	11–7	9–9	2962	2954	100.27%
4	S.E. Melbourne Phoenix	36	19	17	52.78%	2–3	L1	9–9	10–8	3217	3124	102.98%
5	Sydney Kings	36	19	17	52.78%	4–1	W3	11–7	8–10	3112	3087	100.81%
6	Brisbane Bullets	36	18	18	50.00%	4–1	W1	9–9	9–9	3204	3274	97.86%
7	Adelaide 36ers	36	13	23	36.11%	0–5	L7	10–8	3–15	2985	3156	94.58%
8	New Zealand Breakers	36	12	24	33.33%	2–3	L1	8–10	4–14	2937	3021	97.22%
9	Cairns Taipans	36	8	28	22.22%	1–4	L2	6–12	2–16	2940	3207	91.67%

Updated to match(es) played on 9 June 2021. Source: NBL.com.au

=== Ladder progression ===
- Numbers highlighted in green indicate that the team finished the round inside the top four.
- Numbers highlighted in blue indicates the team finished first on the ladder in that round.
- Numbers highlighted in red indicates the team finished last place on the ladder in that round.

2020–21 NBL season
Team	1	2	3	4	5	NBL Cup				10	11	12	13	14	15	16	17	18	19	20	21
Team	1	2	3	4	5	6	7	8	9	10	11	12	13	14	15	16	17	18	19	20	21
Adelaide 36ers	3	5	3	3	3	4	6	5	7	7	7	7	7	7	7	7	7	7	7	7	7
Brisbane Bullets	6	9	5	6	6	7	5	4	5	5	6	6	5	6	6	6	6	6	6	6	6
Cairns Taipans	4	7	8	8	8	8	9	9	9	9	9	9	9	9	9	9	9	9	9	9	9
Illawarra Hawks	2	3	1	2	2	2	4	3	3	4	3	5	4	5	5	5	5	4	4	3	3
Melbourne United	1	1	2	1	1	1	1	1	1	2	2	2	1	1	1	1	1	1	1	1	1
New Zealand Breakers	–	8	9	9	9	9	8	8	8	8	8	8	8	8	8	8	8	8	8	8	8
Perth Wildcats	–	2	4	7	7	3	2	2	2	1	1	1	2	2	2	2	2	2	2	2	2
S.E. Melbourne Phoenix	7	6	6	4	4	5	3	7	4	3	4	3	3	3	4	4	4	3	3	4	4
Sydney Kings	5	4	7	5	5	6	7	6	6	6	5	4	6	4	3	3	3	5	5	5	5

== Awards ==
=== Player of the Week ===
- Round 7, Mitch McCarron

=== NBL Awards ===
- All-NBL First Team: Jock Landale
- All-NBL Second Team: Chris Goulding & Mitch McCarron
- Best Sixth Man: Jo Lual-Acuil
- Executive of the Year: Mark Boyd

=== Melbourne United Awards ===
- Most Valuable Player: Jock Landale
- Best Defensive Player: Yudai Baba
- Coaches Award: Yudai Baba
- Best Club Person Award: Fiona Gant

=== Finals Series ===
- Grand Final MVP: Jock Landale

== See also ==
- 2020–21 NBL season
- Melbourne United
