= 2020–21 Perth Wildcats season =

- NBL Cup champions
- Head coach: (Australia) Trevor Gleeson
- Captain: (Australia) Jesse Wagstaff
- Arena: Perth Arena

NBL results
- Record: 25–11 (69.4%)
- Ladder: 2nd
- Finals finish: Runners-up (lost to United 0–3)
- Stats at NBL.com.au

Cup results
- Record: 7–1 (87.5%)
- Ladder: 1st
- Cup finish: Champions (1st title)

The 2020–21 NBL season was the 40th season for the Perth Wildcats in the NBL.

== Roster ==
=== Squad ===
Note: Flags indicate national team eligibility at FIBA-sanctioned events. Players may hold other non-FIBA nationalities not displayed.

2020–21 Perth Wildcats roster
Players
Coaches

Pos.	No.	Nat.	Name	Ht.	Wt.	Age
F	2	(Australia)	Bairstow, Jarred	2.01 m (6 ft 7 in)	104 kg (229 lb)	33 – 5 November 1992
G	3	(Australia)	White, Kevin	1.87 m (6 ft 2 in)	94 kg (207 lb)	39 – 7 April 1987
G	4	(Australia)	Travers, Luke (DP)	2.01 m (6 ft 7 in)	93 kg (205 lb)	25 – 3 September 2001
G	5	(Australia)	Britt, Taylor (DP)	1.88 m (6 ft 2 in)	79 kg (174 lb)	30 – 22 September 1996
G	8	(Australia)	Norton, Mitch	1.86 m (6 ft 1 in)	91 kg (201 lb)	33 – 1 April 1993
G/F	9	(Australia)	Swaka Lo Buluk, Wani	1.94 m (6 ft 4 in)	87 kg (192 lb)	25 – 9 June 2001
G	11	(United States)	Cotton, Bryce (injured) (I)	1.82 m (6 ft 0 in)	75 kg (165 lb)	34 – 11 August 1992
G/F	12	(Australia)	Blanchfield, Todd	2.00 m (6 ft 7 in)	95 kg (209 lb)	34 – 7 November 1991
C	13	(Australia)	Jervis, Tom	2.11 m (6 ft 11 in)	105 kg (231 lb)	39 – 4 February 1987
F/C	22	(South Sudan)	Majok, Majok (injured)	2.06 m (6 ft 9 in)	111 kg (245 lb)	33 – 10 December 1992
C	23	(Australia)	Magnay, Will	2.08 m (6 ft 10 in)	106 kg (234 lb)	28 – 2 June 1998
F	24	(Australia)	Wagstaff, Jesse (C)	2.03 m (6 ft 8 in)	103 kg (227 lb)	40 – 30 April 1986
F	25	(Australia)	Shervill, Corey (DP)	2.01 m (6 ft 7 in)	100 kg (220 lb)	28 – 19 March 1998
F	33	(United States)	Mooney, John (I)	2.06 m (6 ft 9 in)	111 kg (245 lb)	28 – 20 March 1998
C	34	(Australia)	Ferguson, Andrew (DP)	2.13 m (7 ft 0 in)	104 kg (229 lb)	27 – 17 October 1998
G/F	35	(Australia)	Steindl, Clint	2.00 m (6 ft 7 in)	91 kg (201 lb)	37 – 15 March 1989

Head coach

- (Australia) Trevor Gleeson

Assistant coach(es)

- (United States) Bob Thornton
- (Australia) Jacob Chance
- (Australia) Luke Brennan

Strength & conditioning coach(es)

- (Australia) Josh Cavanagh

Legend

- (C) Team captain
- (DP) Development player
- (IN) Inactive
- (I) Import player
- (TP) Training player
- (NS) Next Star player
- Injured

- Roster
Updated: 6 May 2021

== Pre-season ==
=== Ladder ===
2020–21 NBL pre-season ladder
Ladder
Information

Pos.	Nat.	Name	Pld.	W.	L.	Last 5	Streak	Home	Away	For	Against	Pts %	Win %
1	(Australia)	Melbourne	1	1	0	1–0	W1	0–0	1–0	97	81	119.75%	100.00%
2	(Australia)	Sydney	1	1	0	1–0	W1	1–0	0–0	98	89	110.11%	100.00%
3	(Australia)	Adelaide	3	2	1	2–1	L1	2–0	0–1	276	225	122.67%	66.67%
4	(Australia)	Perth (RC)	2	1	1	1–1	L1	1–1	0–0	165	165	100.00%	50.00%
5	(Australia)	Cairns	2	1	1	1–1	W1	1–1	0–0	177	185	95.68%	50.00%
6	(Australia)	Brisbane	4	2	2	2–2	W2	2–0	0–2	347	378	91.80%	50.00%
7	(Australia)	Illawarra	3	1	2	1–2	L1	0–0	1–2	254	263	96.58%	33.33%
8	(Australia)	S.E. Melbourne	2	0	2	0–2	L2	0–0	0–2	198	210	94.29%	0.00%

Total Rounds
5 weeks

Total Games
11 games

Legend
- (RC) Reigning Champion

- Updated: 9 January 2021

=== Game log ===
2020 pre-season game log
Total: 1–1 (home: 1–1; road: 0–0)
December: 1–1 (home: 1–1; road: 0–0)

Game	Date	Team	Score	High points	High rebounds	High assists	Location Attendance	Record
1	15 December	The Hawks	W 91–83	Bryce Cotton (25)	John Mooney (8)	Mitch Norton (4)	RAC Arena not announced	1–0
2	17 December	The Hawks	L 74–82	John Mooney (19)	John Mooney (13)	Mitch Norton (5)	Bendat Basketball Centre not announced	1–1

== Regular season ==
=== Ladder ===
Pos	2020–21 NBL season											
Pos	Team	Pld	W	L	PCT	Last 5	Streak	Home	Away	PF	PA	PP
1	Melbourne United	36	28	8	77.78%	4–1	W3	14–4	14–4	3189	2956	107.88%
2	Perth Wildcats	36	25	11	69.44%	3–2	L2	13–5	12–6	3133	2900	108.03%
3	Illawarra Hawks	36	20	16	55.56%	4–1	L1	11–7	9–9	2962	2954	100.27%
4	S.E. Melbourne Phoenix	36	19	17	52.78%	2–3	L1	9–9	10–8	3217	3124	102.98%
5	Sydney Kings	36	19	17	52.78%	4–1	W3	11–7	8–10	3112	3087	100.81%
6	Brisbane Bullets	36	18	18	50.00%	4–1	W1	9–9	9–9	3204	3274	97.86%
7	Adelaide 36ers	36	13	23	36.11%	0–5	L7	10–8	3–15	2985	3156	94.58%
8	New Zealand Breakers	36	12	24	33.33%	2–3	L1	8–10	4–14	2937	3021	97.22%
9	Cairns Taipans	36	8	28	22.22%	1–4	L2	6–12	2–16	2940	3207	91.67%

Updated to match(es) played on 9 June 2021. Source: NBL.com.au

=== Ladder progression ===
- Numbers highlighted in green indicate that the team finished the round inside the top four.
- Numbers highlighted in blue indicates the team finished first on the ladder in that round.
- Numbers highlighted in red indicates the team finished last place on the ladder in that round.

2020–21 NBL season
Team	1	2	3	4	5	NBL Cup				10	11	12	13	14	15	16	17	18	19	20	21
Team	1	2	3	4	5	6	7	8	9	10	11	12	13	14	15	16	17	18	19	20	21
Adelaide 36ers	3	5	3	3	3	4	6	5	7	7	7	7	7	7	7	7	7	7	7	7	7
Brisbane Bullets	6	9	5	6	6	7	5	4	5	5	6	6	5	6	6	6	6	6	6	6	6
Cairns Taipans	4	7	8	8	8	8	9	9	9	9	9	9	9	9	9	9	9	9	9	9	9
Illawarra Hawks	2	3	1	2	2	2	4	3	3	4	3	5	4	5	5	5	5	4	4	3	3
Melbourne United	1	1	2	1	1	1	1	1	1	2	2	2	1	1	1	1	1	1	1	1	1
New Zealand Breakers	–	8	9	9	9	9	8	8	8	8	8	8	8	8	8	8	8	8	8	8	8
Perth Wildcats	–	2	4	7	7	3	2	2	2	1	1	1	2	2	2	2	2	2	2	2	2
S.E. Melbourne Phoenix	7	6	6	4	4	5	3	7	4	3	4	3	3	3	4	4	4	3	3	4	4
Sydney Kings	5	4	7	5	5	6	7	6	6	6	5	4	6	4	3	3	3	5	5	5	5

=== Game log ===
2020–21 game log
Total: 25–11 (home: 13–5; road: 12–6)
January: 1–1 (home: 1–1; road: 0–0)

Game	Date	Team	Score	High points	High rebounds	High assists	Location Attendance	Record
1	24 January	South East Melbourne	W 88–76	Bryce Cotton (27)	John Mooney (14)	Bryce Cotton (7)	RAC Arena; 7,150	1–0
2	29 January	South East Melbourne	L 89–90	Bryce Cotton (32)	John Mooney (13)	Bryce Cotton (6)	RAC Arena; 7,150	1–1

February : 1–2 (home: 0–0; road: 1–2)

Game	Date	Team	Score	High points	High rebounds	High assists	Location Attendance	Record
3	7 February	@ Melbourne	L 75–71	Bryce Cotton (24)	Cotton, Mooney, Wagstaff (7)	Bryce Cotton (6)	Bendigo Stadium; 1,953	1–2
4	11 February	@ South East Melbourne	W 75–106	Todd Blanchfield (22)	John Mooney (13)	Bryce Cotton (7)	State Basketball Centre; 1,875	2–2
5	14 February	@ South East Melbourne	L 96–71	John Mooney (19)	John Mooney (10)	Bryce Cotton (9)	State Basketball Centre closed event	2–3

NBL Cup: 7–1 (home: 3–1; road: 4–0)

Game	Date	Team	Score	High points	High rebounds	High assists	Location Attendance	Record
6	20 February	@ Melbourne	W 85–89	Bryce Cotton (29)	John Mooney (9)	Bryce Cotton (7)	John Cain Arena; 3,711	3–3
7	23 February	@ Sydney	W 106–113	Cotton, Mooney (30)	John Mooney (16)	Bryce Cotton (9)	John Cain Arena; 1,079	4–3
8	26 February	@ Cairns	W 69–89	Bryce Cotton (23)	John Mooney (12)	Bryce Cotton (9)	John Cain Arena; 809	5–3
9	3 March	South East Melbourne	W 93–92	Bryce Cotton (28)	John Mooney (11)	Mitch Norton (8)	State Basketball Centre; 2,257	6–3
10	5 March	Brisbane	L 92–95	Bryce Cotton (29)	John Mooney (9)	Cotton, Jervis, Mooney (4)	John Cain Arena; 3,421	6–4
11	7 March	@ Illawarra	W 70–87	Bryce Cotton (18)	John Mooney (10)	Mitch Norton (6)	John Cain Arena; 3,696	7–4
12	12 March	New Zealand	W 85–75	Bryce Cotton (24)	John Mooney (12)	Bryce Cotton (7)	John Cain Arena; 2,478	8–4
13	14 March	Adelaide	W 97–88	Bryce Cotton (34)	John Mooney (16)	Bryce Cotton (7)	John Cain Arena; 4,019	9–4

March: 4–0 (home: 3–0; road: 1–0)

Game	Date	Team	Score	High points	High rebounds	High assists	Location Attendance	Record
14	19 March	Cairns	W 93–75	Bryce Cotton (28)	John Mooney (8)	Bryce Cotton (5)	RAC Arena; 9,997	10–4
15	22 March	Adelaide	W 92–82	Bryce Cotton (36)	John Mooney (14)	Bryce Cotton (6)	RAC Arena; 9,550	11–4
16	26 March	Illawarra	W 81–70	Bryce Cotton (22)	John Mooney (16)	Bryce Cotton (5)	RAC Arena; 10,216	12–4
17	28 March	@ Sydney	W 65–89	Bryce Cotton (29)	John Mooney (18)	Cotton, Mooney (4)	Qudos Bank Arena; 5,067	13–4

April: 5–2 (home: 3–1; road: 2–1)

Game	Date	Team	Score	High points	High rebounds	High assists	Location Attendance	Record
18	1 April	Sydney	W 95–89	Bryce Cotton (22)	John Mooney (11)	Mitch Norton (7)	RAC Arena; 10,123	14–4
19	8 April	@ Sydney	W 69–73	Bryce Cotton (23)	Mooney, Wagstaff (10)	Bryce Cotton (6)	Qudos Bank Arena; 4,115	15–4
20	10 April	@ Adelaide	L 83–68	John Mooney (18)	John Mooney (14)	John Mooney (4)	Adelaide Entertainment Centre; 6,339	15–5
21	13 April	@ New Zealand	W 79–85 (OT)	Bryce Cotton (34)	Bairstow, Mooney, Norton (9)	Cotton, Mooney (3)	Silverdome; 1,358	16–5
22	16 April	Illawarra	W 83–69	Blanchfield, Cotton (18)	John Mooney (15)	Mitch Norton (5)	RAC Arena; 11,485	17–5
23	18 April	New Zealand	L 78–83	John Mooney (22)	John Mooney (8)	Bryce Cotton (9)	RAC Arena; 11,316	17–6
24	23 April	Brisbane	W 92–74	Bryce Cotton (21)	John Mooney (13)	John Mooney (7)	RAC Arena; 4,737	18–6

May: 7–3 (home: 3–1; road: 4–2)

Game	Date	Team	Score	High points	High rebounds	High assists	Location Attendance	Record
25	1 May	@ New Zealand	L 86–84	John Mooney (25)	John Mooney (9)	Blanchfield, Mooney, Norton (4)	Silverdome; 1,621	18–7
26	5 May	@ Melbourne	W 69–82	John Mooney (30)	John Mooney (14)	Bryce Cotton (10)	John Cain Arena; 2,011	19–7
27	9 May	New Zealand	W 98–84	Bryce Cotton (32)	John Mooney (9)	Bryce Cotton (10)	RAC Arena; 10,518	20–7
28	13 May	Melbourne	L 91–99	Cotton, Mooney (24)	John Mooney (14)	John Mooney (5)	RAC Arena; 9,987	20–8
29	15 May	@ Brisbane	W 90–102	Todd Blanchfield (31)	Mitch Norton (8)	John Mooney (5)	Nissan Arena; 3,405	21–8
30	17 May	@ Cairns	W 78–89	Bryce Cotton (24)	John Mooney (10)	Bryce Cotton (5)	Cairns Pop-Up Arena; 1,811	22–8
31	19 May	@ Brisbane	L 91–88	Clint Steindl (25)	Bairstow, Mooney (7)	Bryce Cotton (5)	Nissan Arena; 1,332	22–9
32	21 May	Cairns	W 100–79	Blanchfield, Cotton (19)	Will Magnay (9)	Mitch Norton (5)	RAC Arena; 10,671	23–9
33	23 May	@ Adelaide	W 68–76	Mitch Norton (19)	John Mooney (12)	John Mooney (5)	Adelaide Entertainment Centre; 6,422	24–9
34	27 May	Sydney	W 81–67	Todd Blanchfield (23)	John Mooney (10)	Mitch Norton (6)	RAC Arena; 10,650	25–9

June: 0–2 (home: 0–1; road: 0–1)

Game	Date	Team	Score	High points	High rebounds	High assists	Location Attendance	Record
35	1 June	@ Illawarra	L 81–79	Clint Steindl (15)	John Mooney (15)	Mitch Norton (9)	WIN Entertainment Centre; 2,038	25–10
36	4 June	Melbourne	L 64–78	Todd Blanchfield (15)	Luke Travers (8)	Kevin White (6)	RAC Arena; 12,185	25–11

== Postseason ==
2021 playoff game log
Total: 2–4 (home: 1–3; road: 1–1)
Semifinals: 2–1 (home: 1–1; road: 1–0)

Game	Date	Team	Score	High points	High rebounds	High assists	Location Attendance	Series
1	10 June	Illawarra	L 72–74	Todd Blanchfield (24)	John Mooney (16)	Bairstow, Norton (3)	RAC Arena; 7,662	0–1
2	12 June	@ Illawarra	W 71–79	John Mooney (18)	Luke Travers (10)	Kevin White (5)	WIN Entertainment Centre; 5,217	1–1
3	14 June	Illawarra	W 79–71	Todd Blanchfield (24)	John Mooney (14)	Luke Travers (4)	RAC Arena; 8,986	2–1

NBL Finals: 0–3 (home: 0–2; road: 0–1)

Game	Date	Team	Score	High points	High rebounds	High assists	Location Attendance	Series
1	18 June	Melbourne	L 70–73	Todd Blanchfield (27)	Blanchfield, Mooney (7)	John Mooney (4)	RAC Arena; 9,951	0–1
2	20 June	Melbourne	L 74–83	John Mooney (17)	John Mooney (9)	Mooney, Shervill (3)	RAC Arena; 11,097	0–2
3	25 June	@ Melbourne	L 81–76	Mooney, White (14)	John Mooney (13)	Mitch Norton (3)	John Cain Arena; 4,507	0–3

== Transactions ==
=== Re-signed ===
Player	Signed
Bryce Cotton	26 May
Majok Majok	3 June
Taylor Britt	13 August

=== Additions ===
Player	Signed	Former team
Todd Blanchfield	20 July	Illawarra Hawks
Kevin White	6 August	Adelaide 36ers
John Mooney	15 August	Notre Dame
Andrew Ferguson	24 August	CSU Monterey Bay
Corey Shervill	24 November	St. Edward's
Jarred Bairstow	9 December	Brisbane Capitals
Tom Jervis	14 January	Perth Wildcats
Will Magnay	6 May	Erie BayHawks

=== Subtractions ===
Player	Reason left	New team
Nick Kay	Opted Out	Real Betis Baloncesto
Rhys Vague	Free Agent	Kagawa Five Arrows
Damian Martin	Retired	N/A
Terrico White	Free Agent	Cariduros de Fajardo

== Awards ==
=== Player of the Week ===
Round 8, John Mooney

Round 10, Bryce Cotton

Round 11, John Mooney

Round 16, John Mooney

Round 17, Bryce Cotton

== See also ==
- 2020–21 NBL season
- Perth Wildcats
