= 2018–19 Melbourne United season =

- Head coach: (Australia) Dean Vickerman
- Captain: (Australia) Chris Goulding
- Arena: Melbourne Arena

NBL results
- Record: 18–10 (64.3%)
- Ladder: 2nd
- Finals finish: Runners-up (lost to Wildcats 1–3)
- Stats at NBL.com.au

Player records
- Points: (United States) Ware 18.8
- Rebounds: (United States) Boone 8.4
- Assists: (United States) Ware 4.8
- Efficiency: (United States) Boone 56%
- All statistics correct as of 17 March 2019.

The 2018–19 NBL season was the 36th season for Melbourne United in the NBL, and the 5th under the banner of Melbourne United.

== Roster ==
Note: Flags indicate national team eligibility at FIBA-sanctioned events. Players may hold other non-FIBA nationalities not displayed.

2018–19 Melbourne United roster
Players
Coaches

Pos.	No.	Nat.	Name	Ht.	Wt.
F/C	3	(United States)	Boone, Josh (I)	2.08 m (6 ft 10 in)	112 kg (247 lb)
G	5	(Australia)	Short, Sam (DP)	1.95 m (6 ft 5 in)	78 kg (172 lb)
G	7	(Australia)	Hooley, Peter	1.93 m (6 ft 4 in)	91 kg (201 lb)
F	9	(Australia)	Moller, Craig	2.03 m (6 ft 8 in)	93 kg (205 lb)
G	10	(Australia)	McCarron, Mitch	1.89 m (6 ft 2 in)	97 kg (214 lb)
F/C	14	(New Zealand)	Smith-Milner, Tohi	2.06 m (6 ft 9 in)	112 kg (247 lb)
F	15	(Australia)	Trist, Dan (IN)	2.04 m (6 ft 8 in)	111 kg (245 lb)
G/F	17	(United States)	Kennedy, D. J. (I)	1.98 m (6 ft 6 in)	98 kg (216 lb)
F	20	(Australia)	Barlow, David	2.05 m (6 ft 9 in)	97 kg (214 lb)
G	21	(United States)	Ware, Casper (I)	1.78 m (5 ft 10 in)	79 kg (174 lb)
G/F	30	(Australia)	McDaniel, Sam (DP)	1.98 m (6 ft 6 in)	95 kg (209 lb)
C	35	(New Zealand)	Pledger, Alex	2.15 m (7 ft 1 in)	113 kg (249 lb)
G	43	(Australia)	Goulding, Chris (C)	1.92 m (6 ft 4 in)	92 kg (203 lb)
F	55	(Australia)	Jois, Venky	2.03 m (6 ft 8 in)	104 kg (229 lb)

Head coach

- (Australia) Dean Vickerman

Assistant coach(es)

- (New Zealand) Paul Henare
- (Australia) Justin Schueller

Legend

- (C) Team captain
- (DP) Development player
- (IN) Inactive
- (I) Import player
- (TP) Training player
- (NS) Next Star player
- Injured

- Roster
Updated: 26 January 2019

== Preseason ==
=== Game log ===
2018 pre-season game log
Total: 7–5 (home: 6–3; road: 1–2)
August: 4–0 (Home: 4–0; Road: 0–0)

Game	Date	Team	Score	High points	High rebounds	High assists	Location Attendance	Record
1	4 August	Chinese Taipei	W 136–85	not available	not available	not available	Melbourne Sports and Aquatic Centre closed indoors	1–0
2	9 August	Saint Mary's Gaels	W 81–80	not available	not available	not available	State Basketball Centre; 3,200	2–0
3	16 August	Loyola Marymount Lions	W 100–80	not available	not available	not available	Casey Basketball Stadium; 1,500	3–0
4	30 August	Sydney	W 93–85	not available	not available	not available	Bendigo Stadium; 2,000	4–0

September: 3–4 (Home: 2–3; Road: 1–1)

Game	Date	Team	Score	High points	High rebounds	High assists	Location Attendance	Record
5	1 September	Sydney	L 85–93	not available	not available	not available	State Basketball Centre; 3,200	4–1
6	11 September	Cairns	W 89–88	Josh Boone (18)	Josh Boone (9)	Chris Goulding (7)	Dandenong Basketball Stadium; 1,000	5–1
7	13 September	Cairns	L 75–78	not available	not available	not available	Melbourne Sports and Aquatic Centre; 2,000	5–2
8	20 September	Adelaide	L 87–97	Casper Ware (16)	Kennedy, Smith-Milner (6)	McCarron, Ware (3)	Bendigo Stadium not available	5–3
9	22 September	@ Brisbane	W 90–96	Casper Ware (15)	David Barlow (9)	Casper Ware (5)	Ballarat Stadium not available	6–3
10	23 September	Illawarra	W 88–82	Chris Goulding (20)	Alex Pledger (11)	Mitch McCarron (7)	Ballarat Stadium not available	7–3
11	28 September	@ Philadelphia	L 104–84	Casper Ware (19)	Alex Pledger (13)	Casper Ware (5)	Wells Fargo Center; 20,318	7–4

October: 0–1 (Home: 0–0; Road: 0–1)

Game	Date	Team	Score	High points	High rebounds	High assists	Location Attendance	Record
12	5 October	@ Toronto	L 120–82	Casper Ware (17)	Josh Boone (11)	Casper Ware (5)	Scotiabank Arena; 15,781	7–5

== Regular season ==
=== Ladder ===
Pos	2018–19 NBL season											
Pos	Team	Pld	W	L	PCT	Last 5	Streak	Home	Away	PF	PA	PP
1	Perth Wildcats^{1}	28	18	10	64.29%	4–1	L1	12–2	6–8	2499	2355	106.11%
2	Melbourne United^{1}	28	18	10	64.29%	3–2	W1	10–4	8–6	2586	2478	104.36%
3	Sydney Kings^{1}	28	18	10	64.29%	4–1	W1	9–5	9–5	2438	2380	102.44%
4	Brisbane Bullets^{2}	28	14	14	50.00%	2–3	W1	9–5	5–9	2503	2480	100.93%
5	Adelaide 36ers^{2}	28	14	14	50.00%	2–3	L2	6–8	8–6	2687	2681	100.22%
6	New Zealand Breakers^{3}	28	12	16	42.86%	2–3	L1	7–7	5–9	2649	2641	100.30%
7	Illawarra Hawks^{3}	28	12	16	42.86%	1–4	L3	8–6	4–10	2493	2664	93.58%
8	Cairns Taipans	28	6	22	21.43%	2–3	L1	3–11	3–11	2400	2576	93.17%

Updated to match(es) played on 17 February 2019. Source: NBL.com.au

The NBL tie-breaker system as outlined in the NBL Rules and Regulations states that in the case of an identical win–loss record, the overall points percentage between the teams will determine order of seeding.

^{1}Perth Wildcats won on overall points percentage. Melbourne United finished 2nd on overall points percentage.

^{2}Brisbane Bullets won on overall points percentage.

^{3}New Zealand Breakers won on overall points percentage.

=== Ladder progression ===
- Numbers highlighted in green indicate that the team finished the round inside the top four.
- Numbers highlighted in blue indicates the team finished first on the ladder in that round.
- Numbers highlighted in red indicates the team finished last place on the ladder in that round.

2018–19 NBL season
Team	1	2	3	4	5	6	7	8	9	10	11	12	13	14	15	16	17	18
Adelaide 36ers	3	4	4	6	7	5	5	6	5	5	5	5	5	5	5	4	4	5
Brisbane Bullets	5	6	6	3	5	6	4	4	4	4	4	4	4	4	4	5	5	4
Cairns Taipans	2	3	8	8	8	8	8	8	8	8	8	8	8	8	8	8	8	8
Illawarra Hawks	8	7	7	7	6	7	7	5	6	6	6	7	6	6	6	6	6	7
Melbourne United	4	2	2	2	2	2	2	2	3	1	3	3	2	2	1	1	2	2
New Zealand Breakers	6	8	5	5	4	4	6	7	7	7	7	6	7	7	7	7	7	6
Perth Wildcats	1	1	1	1	1	1	1	1	1	3	2	2	3	3	2	2	1	1
Sydney Kings	7	5	3	4	3	3	3	3	2	2	1	1	1	1	3	3	3	3

=== Game log ===
2018–19 game log
Total: 18–10 (home: 10–4; road: 8–6)
October: 3–2 (Home: 2–1; Road: 1–1)

Game	Date	Team	Score	High points	High rebounds	High assists	Location Attendance	Record
1	12 October	@ Illawarra	W 122–123 (4OT)	Josh Boone (24)	Josh Boone (12)	Casper Ware (9)	WIN Entertainment Centre; 2,688	1–0
2	14 October	New Zealand	L 81–88	Chris Goulding (22)	Mitch McCarron (8)	Hooley, McCarron (4)	Melbourne Arena; 8,329	1–1
3	21 October	Adelaide	W 75–72	Barlow, Boone (15)	Josh Boone (16)	Barlow, Goulding, McCarron (5)	Melbourne Arena; 7,764	2–1
4	27 October	@ Perth	L 101–96 (2OT)	Chris Goulding (29)	Josh Boone (11)	Mitch McCarron (5)	RAC Arena; 11,675	2–2
5	29 October	Illawarra	W 99–93	Casper Ware (26)	Alex Pledger (12)	Mitch McCarron (4)	Melbourne Arena; 6,478	3–2

November: 6–1 (Home: 4–0; Road: 2–1)

Game	Date	Team	Score	High points	High rebounds	High assists	Location Attendance	Record
6	3 November	@ Cairns	W 85–98	Casper Ware (32)	Barlow, Boone (7)	Barlow, Hooley, Kennedy (4)	Cairns Convention Centre not available	4–2
7	5 November	Sydney	W 77–70	D. J. Kennedy (24)	Boone, Kennedy (10)	Kennedy, Ware (3)	Melbourne Arena; 10,300	5–2
8	8 November	@ Illawarra	L 87–81	McCarron, Ware (18)	Josh Boone (8)	Josh Boone (6)	WIN Entertainment Centre; 2,000	5–3
9	11 November	Cairns	W 87–80	Casper Ware (34)	Mitch McCarron (9)	Casper Ware (6)	Melbourne Arena; 7,897	6–3
10	16 November	@ New Zealand	W 101–108	Josh Boone (26)	Josh Boone (10)	D. J. Kennedy (7)	ILT Stadium; 2,676	7–3
11	18 November	Brisbane	W 102–94	Casper Ware (23)	Boone, Pledger (6)	Casper Ware (6)	Melbourne Arena; 7,656	8–3
12	24 November	Sydney	W 84–82	Casper Ware (23)	D. J. Kennedy (12)	Casper Ware (5)	Melbourne Arena; 10,300	9–3

December: 2–3 (Home: 1–2; Road: 1–1)

Game	Date	Team	Score	High points	High rebounds	High assists	Location Attendance	Record
13	8 December	@ Brisbane	L 97–94	David Barlow (20)	Alex Pledger (7)	Casper Ware (9)	Brisbane Convention Centre; 3,304	9–4
14	10 December	Brisbane	L 74–90	Casper Ware (22)	David Barlow (9)	David Barlow (5)	Melbourne Arena; 7,083	9–5
15	17 December	Perth	W 82–65	Chris Goulding (21)	Boone, Goulding, Kennedy, Pledger (7)	Mitch McCarron (4)	Melbourne Arena; 7,765	10–5
16	23 December	@ Sydney	W 70–75	Chris Goulding (16)	David Barlow (11)	Casper Ware (7)	Qudos Bank Arena; 12,050	11–5
17	26 December	Adelaide	L 101–103	Casper Ware (26)	D. J. Kennedy (5)	Kennedy, Ware (5)	Melbourne Arena; 10,300	11–6

January: 3–2 (Home: 1–0; Road: 2–2)

Game	Date	Team	Score	High points	High rebounds	High assists	Location Attendance	Record
18	6 January	@ Brisbane	L 95–86	Casper Ware (29)	Josh Boone (10)	McCarron, Smith-Milner (5)	Gold Coast Sports and Leisure Centre; 4,485	11–7
19	13 January	@ Cairns	W 89–99 (OT)	Casper Ware (27)	Josh Boone (15)	Casper Ware (6)	Cairns Convention Centre; 4,364	12–7
20	20 January	@ Perth	L 84–79	Mitch McCarron (21)	Josh Boone (12)	Casper Ware (6)	RAC Arena; 13,353	12–8
21	23 January	Illawarra	W 113–89	Casper Ware (25)	Josh Boone (11)	Barlow, Kennedy, Ware (4)	Melbourne Arena; 7,022	13–8
22	28 January	@ Adelaide	W 91–114	Josh Boone (19)	Josh Boone (10)	Casper Ware (10)	Titanium Security Arena not available	14–8

February: 4–2 (Home: 2–1; Road: 2–1)

Game	Date	Team	Score	High points	High rebounds	High assists	Location Attendance	Record
23	1 February	@ New Zealand	W 87–107	Chris Goulding (24)	Boone, Kennedy (11)	Goulding, McCarron (5)	Spark Arena; 4,714	15–8
24	3 February	New Zealand	W 111–102 (OT)	Mitch McCarron (25)	D. J. Kennedy (9)	Kennedy, McCarron (6)	Melbourne Arena; 9,026	16–8
25	8 February	@ Sydney	L 97–85	Casper Ware (17)	D. J. Kennedy (8)	Casper Ware (5)	Qudos Bank Arena; 7,104	16–9
26	10 February	@ Adelaide	W 87–89	Casper Ware (20)	Josh Boone (14)	Casper Ware (7)	Titanium Security Arena not available	17–9
27	14 February	Cairns	L 85–87	Chris Goulding (22)	D. J. Kennedy (8)	Goulding, Kennedy, McCarron, Ware (4)	Melbourne Arena; 6,590	17–10
28	17 February	Perth	W 81–70 (OT)	D. J. Kennedy (21)	D. J. Kennedy (15)	D. J. Kennedy (6)	Melbourne Arena; 10,300	18–10

== Postseason ==
2019 finals game log
Total: 3–3 (home: 2–1; road: 1–2)
Semifinals: 2–0 (Home: 1–0; Road: 1–0)

Game	Date	Team	Score	High points	High rebounds	High assists	Location Attendance	Record
1	28 February	Sydney	W 95–73	Casper Ware (22)	Josh Boone (7)	Casper Ware (7)	Melbourne Arena; 7,566	1–0
2	3 March	@ Sydney	W 76–90	Casper Ware (30)	Josh Boone (8)	Mitch McCarron (5)	Qudos Bank Arena; 14,569	2–0

Grand Final: 1–3 (Home: 1–1; Road: 0–2)

Game	Date	Team	Score	High points	High rebounds	High assists	Location Attendance	Record
3	8 March	@ Perth	L 81–71	Casper Ware (19)	Josh Boone (12)	Casper Ware (4)	RAC Arena; 12,490	0–1
4	10 March	Perth	W 92–74	Goulding, Ware (14)	D. J. Kennedy (14)	Kennedy, McCarron (4)	Melbourne Arena; 10,062	1–1
5	15 March	@ Perth	L 96–67	Barlow, Kennedy 13	D. J. Kennedy (10)	D. J. Kennedy (6)	RAC Arena; 13,412	1–2
6	17 March	Perth	L 84–97	Casper Ware (18)	Josh Boone (7)	Goulding, Ware (4)	Melbourne Arena; 10,007	1–3

== Transactions ==
=== Re-signed ===
Player	Signed
Chris Goulding	26 April
Peter Hooley	30 April
Tohi Smith-Milner	2 May
David Barlow	7 May
Josh Boone	17 August
Casper Ware	17 August

=== Additions ===
Player	Signed	Former team
Dan Trist	3 May	Club Ourense Baloncesto
Alex Pledger	18 May	New Zealand Breakers
Mitch McCarron	7 June	Petrol Olimpija
Sam McDaniel	15 August	Mount Gambier Pioneers
D. J. Kennedy	9 September	Pınar Karşıyaka
Venky Jois	26 January	Rasta Vechta

=== Subtractions ===
Player	Reason left	New team
Majok Majok	Free agent	New Zealand Breakers
Tai Wesley	Free agent	New Zealand Breakers
Kyle Adnam	Free agent	Sydney Kings
David Andersen	Free agent	Illawarra Hawks
Carrick Felix	Released	Washington Wizards
Casey Prather	Free agent	Promitheas Patras

== Awards ==
=== NBL Awards ===
- All-NBL First Team: Casper Ware
- Coach of the Year: Dean Vickerman

=== Melbourne United Awards ===
- Most Valuable Player: Casper Ware
- Best Defensive Player: David Barlow
- Coaches Award: Mitch McCarron
- Best Club Person Award: Fiona Gant

== See also ==
- 2018–19 NBL season
- Melbourne United
