= 2018 NBL Finals =

Tournament details
- Countries: Australia; New Zealand
- Dates: 3–31 March 2018
- Season: 2017–18
- Teams: 4

Final positions
- Champions: Melbourne United (5th title)
- Runners-up: Adelaide 36ers
- Semifinalists: Perth Wildcats; New Zealand Breakers

The 2018 NBL Finals were the championship series of the 2017–18 NBL season and the conclusion of the season. The semi-finals started on 3 March and ended 9 March 2018. The Grand Final series started on 16 March and ended on 31 March 2018. Melbourne United won its fifth NBL championship title.

== Format ==
The 2017–18 National Basketball League Finals will be played in March 2018 between the top four teams of the regular season, consisting of two best-of-three semi-final and one best-of-five final series, where the higher seed hosts the first, third and fifth games.

== Qualification ==
=== Qualified teams ===
Team	Date of qualification	Round of qualification	Finals appearance	Previous appearance	Previous best performance
Melbourne United	2 February 2018	17	23rd	2016	Champions (1993, 1997, 2006, 2008)
Adelaide 36ers	4 February 2018	17	25th	2017	Champions (1986, 1998, 1999, 2002)
Perth Wildcats	4 February 2018	17	32nd	2017	Champions (1990, 1991, 1995, 2000, 2010, 2014, 2016, 2017)
New Zealand Breakers	4 February 2018	17	8th	2016	Champions (2011, 2012, 2013, 2015)

=== Ladder ===
Pos	2017–18 NBL season											
Pos	Team	Pld	W	L	PCT	Last 5	Streak	Home	Away	PF	PA	PP
1	Melbourne United	28	20	8	71.43%	4–1	L1	11–3	9–5	2434	2298	105.92%
2	Adelaide 36ers	28	18	10	64.29%	3–2	W3	10–4	8–6	2654	2527	105.03%
3	Perth Wildcats	28	16	12	57.14%	2–3	W1	9–5	7–7	2388	2271	105.15%
4	New Zealand Breakers	28	15	13	53.57%	1–4	L4	9–5	6–8	2364	2387	99.04%
5	Illawarra Hawks	28	12	16	42.86%	2–3	W2	7–7	5–9	2474	2539	97.44%
6	Cairns Taipans^{1}	28	11	17	39.29%	1–4	L1	8–6	3–11	2215	2281	97.11%
7	Sydney Kings^{1}	28	11	17	39.29%	4–1	W4	6–8	5–9	2418	2504	96.57%
8	Brisbane Bullets	28	9	19	32.14%	1–4	L3	6–8	3–11	2347	2487	94.37%

Updated to match(es) played on 18 February 2018. Source: NBL.com.au

=== Ladder Progression ===
- Numbers highlighted in green indicate that the team finished the round inside the top four.
- Numbers highlighted in blue indicates the team finished first on the ladder in that round.
- Numbers highlighted in red indicates the team finished last place on the ladder in that round.

2017–18 NBL season
Team	1	2	3	4	5	6	7	8	9	10	11	12	13	14	15	16	17	18	19
Adelaide 36ers	4	4	3	3	4	4	3	3	4	4	4	4	4	4	2	2	3	2	2
Brisbane Bullets	7	7	6	6	7	6	7	7	6	5	6	7	7	7	7	7	7	7	8
Cairns Taipans	1	3	4	4	6	7	5	5	5	6	5	6	6	6	5	6	6	5	6
Illawarra Hawks	5	8	7	8	5	5	6	6	7	7	7	5	5	5	6	5	5	6	5
Melbourne United	3	2	5	5	3	3	4	4	3	3	3	2	2	1	1	1	1	1	1
New Zealand Breakers	8	5	1	2	1	1	1	1	2	2	1	3	3	3	3	4	2	4	4
Perth Wildcats	2	1	2	1	2	2	2	2	1	1	2	1	1	2	4	3	4	3	3
Sydney Kings	6	6	8	7	8	8	8	8	8	8	8	8	8	8	8	8	8	8	7

=== Seedings ===
1. Melbourne United
2. Adelaide 36ers
3. Perth Wildcats
4. New Zealand Breakers

The NBL tie-breaker system as outlined in the NBL Rules and Regulations states that in the case of an identical win–loss record, the overall points percentage will determine order of seeding.

=== Playoff bracket ===
Semifinals
1	Melbourne United	88	88	X
4	New Zealand Breakers	77	86	X
2	Adelaide 36ers	109	89	X
3	Perth Wildcats	74	88	X

Grand Final
1	Melbourne United	107	95	101	81	100
2	Adelaide 36ers	96	110	98	90	82

== Semi-finals series ==
=== (1) Melbourne United vs (4) New Zealand Breakers ===
3 March 2018	Melbourne United	88–77 (Series: Melbourne leads series, 1–0)	New Zealand Breakers	Melbourne Arena, Melbourne
5:30pm EDT	Scoring by quarter: 21-24, 22-19, 24-18, 21-16
Fox Sports	Pts: Casper Ware 33; Rebs: Josh Boone 8 Asts: Tai Wesley 4	boxscore report	Pts: D. J. Newbill 19; Rebs: Alex Pledger 10; Asts: Shea Ili 5	Attendance: 6,833; Referees: Michael Aylen, Matt Townsend, Jon Chapman

5 March 2018	New Zealand Breakers	86–88(OT) (Series: Melbourne wins series, 2–0)	Melbourne United	Spark Arena, Auckland
7:30pm NZDT	Scoring by quarter: 26-13, 12-20, 25-25, 15-20, Overtime: 8-10
Fox Sports	Pts: D. J. Newbill 21; Rebs: Rakeem Christmas 8 Asts: Thomas Abercrombie 5	boxscore report	Pts: Josh Boone 33; Rebs: Josh Boone 15; Asts: Chris Goulding 6	Attendance: TBA; Referees: Vaughan Mayberry, Michael Aylen, Damien Lyons

Regular season series

Tied 2–2 in the regular season series; 351-346 points differential to New Zealand:

22 October 2017	Melbourne United	76–88	New Zealand Breakers	Melbourne Arena, Melbourne

18 January 2018	New Zealand Breakers	98–81	Melbourne United	North Shore Events Centre, Auckland

9 February 2018	Melbourne United	89–83	New Zealand Breakers	Melbourne Arena, Melbourne

11 February 2018	New Zealand Breakers	82–100	Melbourne United	Spark Arena, Auckland

=== (2) Adelaide 36ers vs (3) Perth Wildcats ===
3 March 2018	Adelaide 36ers	109–74 (Series: Adelaide leads series, 1–0)	Perth Wildcats	Titanium Security Arena, Adelaide
7:00pm CDT	Scoring by quarter: 19-18, 31-26, 26-18, 33-12
Fox Sports	Pts: Josh Childress 22; Rebs: Mitch Creek 11; Asts: Shannon Shorter 7	boxscore report	Pts: Bryce Cotton 22; Rebs: Brandt, Cooke 6 Asts: Jarrod Kenny 4	Attendance: 6,000; Referees: Vaughan Mayberry, James Boyer, Chris Reid

9 March 2018	Perth Wildcats	88–89 (Series: Adelaide wins series, 2–0)	Adelaide 36ers	Perth Arena, Perth
6:30pm WST	Scoring by quarter: 28-15, 21-25, 18-23, 21-26
Fox Sports	Pts: Bryce Cotton 31; Rebs: Angus Brandt 9 Asts: JP Tokoto 5	boxscore report	Pts: Josh Childress 25; Rebs: Josh Childress 10; Asts: Nathan Sobey 5	Attendance: 12,055; Referees: Vaughan Mayberry, Chris Reid, Michael Aylen

Regular season series

Tied 2–2 in the regular season series; 367-360 points differential to Perth:

8 December 2017	Perth Wildcats	88–79	Adelaide 36ers	Perth Arena, Perth

4 January 2018	Adelaide 36ers	97–86	Perth Wildcats	Titanium Security Arena, Adelaide

2 February 2018	Perth Wildcats	111–90	Adelaide 36ers	Perth Arena, Perth

4 February 2018	Adelaide 36ers	94–82	Perth Wildcats	Titanium Security Arena, Adelaide

== Grand Final series ==
=== (1) Melbourne United vs (2) Adelaide 36ers ===
16 March 2018	Melbourne United	107–96 (Series: Melbourne leads series 1–0)	Adelaide 36ers	Hisense Arena, Melbourne
7:30pm EDT	Scoring by quarter: 29-28, 24-19, 26-24, 28-25
Fox Sports	Pts: Chris Goulding 26; Rebs: Josh Boone 7 Asts: Wesley, Hooley 5	boxscore report	Pts: Daniel Johnson 18; Rebs: Mitch Creek 9 Asts: Creek, Moore 4	Attendance: 8,699; Referees: Vaughan Mayberry, Chris Reid, Michael Aylen

18 March 2018	Adelaide 36ers	110–95 (Series: Series tied 1–1)	Melbourne United	Titanium Security Arena, Adelaide
2:30pm CDT	Scoring by quarter: 27-19, 30-22, 25-23, 28-31
Fox Sports	Pts: Majok Deng 18; Rebs: Mitch Creek 9 Asts: Nathan Sobey 5	boxscore report	Pts: Casey Prather 20; Rebs: Casey Prather 7 Asts: Tai Wesley 3	Attendance: 7,000; Referees: Vaughan Mayberry, Michael Aylen, Matt Townsend

23 March 2018	Melbourne United	101–98 (Series: Melbourne leads series 2–1)	Adelaide 36ers	Hisense Arena, Melbourne
7:30pm EDT	Scoring by quarter: 33-22, 20-31, 28-22, 20-23
Fox Sports	Pts: Casper Ware 25; Rebs: Casey Prather 6 Asts: Ware, Hooley 3	boxscore report	Pts: Daniel Johnson 20; Rebs: Creek, Deng 8 Asts: Mitch Creek 5	Attendance: 9,362; Referees: Michael Aylen, Vaughan Mayberry, Chris Reid

25 March 2018	Adelaide 36ers	90–81 (Series: Series tied 2–2)	Melbourne United	Titanium Security Arena, Adelaide
2:30pm CDT	Scoring by quarter: 29-21, 26-10, 16-27, 19-23
Fox Sports	Pts: Daniel Johnson 21; Rebs: Daniel Johnson 9 Asts: Shannon Shorter 3	boxscore report	Pts: Casey Prather 23; Rebs: Casey Prather 7 Asts: Chris Goulding 4	Attendance: 7,500; Referees: Vaughan Mayberry, Michael Aylen, Chris Reid

31 March 2018	Melbourne United	100–82 (Series: Melbourne wins series, 3–2)	Adelaide 36ers	Hisense Arena, Melbourne
6:00pm EDT	Scoring by quarter: 34-22, 23-22, 21-25, 22-13
Fox Sports	Pts: Goulding, Ware 23; Rebs: Josh Boone 12; Asts: Tai Wesley 3	boxscore report	Pts: Shannon Shorter 20; Rebs: Mitch Creek 10; Asts: Ramone Moore 7	Attendance: 10,300; Referees: Michael Aylen, Vaughan Mayberry, Chris Reid

Starters:			Pts	Reb	Ast
SG	43	(Australia) Chris Goulding	23	4	1
PF	42	(Guam) Tai Wesley	14	9	3
SF	23	(United States) Casey Prather	19	11	1
PG	21	(United States) Casper Ware	23	1	2
C	3	(United States) Josh Boone	10	12	1
Reserves:					
PF	13	(Australia) David Andersen	0	1	0
SF	20	(Australia) David Barlow	3	5	0
PG	8	(Australia) Kyle Adnam	0	0	0
C	22	(South Sudan) Majok Majok	0	0	0
C	14	(New Zealand) Tohi Smith-Milner	0	0	0
SF	9	(Australia) Craig Moller	2	1	0
PG	7	(Australia) Peter Hooley	6	1	2
Head coach:
(Australia) Dean Vickerman

Melbourne	Adelaide

2017/18 NBL champions

Melbourne United
(5th title)

Starters:			Pts	Reb	Ast
C	21	(Australia) Daniel Johnson	17	8	2
PF	55	(Australia) Mitch Creek	15	10	1
SG	20	(Australia) Nathan Sobey	7	9	3
SF	10	(United States) Ramone Moore	10	2	7
PG	12	(United States) Shannon Shorter	20	4	3
Reserves:					
PG	7	(Australia) Brendan Teys	0	0	0
PG	19	(Australia) Adam Doyle	0	0	0
PG	8	(Australia) Nelson Larkins	0	0	0
C	1	(Australia) Matt Hodgson	2	0	0
PF	13	(South Sudan) Majok Deng	1	1	0
SF	22	(Australia) Anthony Drmic	10	3	0
Head coach:
(United States) Joey Wright

== See also ==
- 2017–18 NBL season
