= 2017–18 NBL season =

Professional basketball season

- Logo of the league sponsored by Hungry Jack's
- League: National Basketball League
- Season: 2017–18
- Dates: 5 October 2017 – 31 March 2018
- Teams: 8
- TV partners: Australia: Fox Sports SBS; New Zealand: Sky Sport; Online: NBL TV

Regular season
- Season champions: Melbourne United
- Season MVP: (United States) Bryce Cotton (Perth)

Finals
- Champions: Melbourne United (5th title)
- Runners-up: Adelaide 36ers
- Semi-finalists: Perth Wildcats; New Zealand Breakers
- Finals MVP: (Australia) Chris Goulding (Melbourne)

Statistical leaders
| Points | (United States) Jerome Randle (Sydney) | 19.8 |
| Rebounds | (United States) Josh Boone (Melbourne) | 9.3 |
| Assists | (United States) Jerome Randle (Sydney) | 5.2 |
| Efficiency | (India) Amritpal Singh (Sydney) | 66% |

Records
- Attendance: 688,712 (regular season)

NBL seasons
- ← 2016–17 2018–19 →

The 2017–18 NBL season was the 40th season of the National Basketball League since its establishment in 1979. A total of eight teams contested the league. The regular season was played between October 2017 and February 2018, followed by a post-season featuring the top four in March 2018.

Australian broadcast rights to the season were held by Fox Sports, in the third year of a five-year deal, with two games per week simulcast on SBS. In New Zealand, Sky Sport were the official league broadcaster.

As Australia and New Zealand participated in 2019 FIBA Basketball World Cup qualification, the league took a break during the newly created FIBA international windows of 20–28 November 2017 and 19–27 February 2018.

== Pre-season ==
=== 2017 NBL All-Australian Tour of China ===
| 5 July 2017 | China | 68–66 | NBL All-Australian Team | Beijing Sport University, Beijing, China |
| Fox Sports |

| 7 July 2017 | China | 89–75 | NBL All-Australian Team | Jilin City Arena, Jilin City, China |
| Fox Sports |

| 9 July 2017 | China | 75–89 | NBL All-Australian Team | Nissan Sports Centre, Dongguan, China |
| Fox Sports |

China won the series 2-1.

=== Adelaide 36ers pre-season ===
==== 2017 Merlion Cup ====
| 21 September 2017 | Adelaide 36ers | 101–46 | Yulon Luxgen Dinos | OCBC Arena, Singapore |
| NBL TV |

| 22 September 2017 | Singapore Slingers | 52–95 | Adelaide 36ers | OCBC Arena, Singapore |
| NBL TV |

===== Semi-final =====
| 23 September 2017 | Adelaide 36ers | 94–72 | Jeonju KCC Egis | OCBC Arena, Singapore |
| NBL TV |

===== Final =====
| 24 September 2017 | Adelaide 36ers | 101–81 | Shanghai Sharks | OCBC Arena, Singapore |
| NBL TV |

Adelaide 36ers won the tournament.

=== Brisbane Bullets pre-season ===
| 18 July 2017 | Brisbane Bullets | 89–83 | China | Carrara Stadium, Gold Coast |
| NBL TV | | | | Attendance: 3,128 |

| 22 September 2017 | Brisbane Bullets | 92–96 | Illawarra Hawks | Maroochydore Basketball Stadium, Sunshine Coast |
| NBL TV |

| 24 September 2017 | Brisbane Bullets | 67–94 | Illawarra Hawks | Cornubia Park Sports Centre, Brisbane |
| NBL TV |

| 13 October 2017 | Phoenix Suns | 114–93 | Brisbane Bullets | Talking Stick Resort Arena, Phoenix, USA |
| ESPN | | | | Attendance: 8,297 |

=== Cairns Taipans pre-season ===
| 13 August 2017 | Cairns Taipans | 85–110 | University of Oklahoma | Early Settler Stadium, Cairns |
| NBL TV |

| 15 August 2017 | Cairns Taipans | 89–70 | American University | Early Settler Stadium, Cairns |
| NBL TV |

| 18 August 2017 | Cairns Taipans | 69–71 | University of Texas | Early Settler Stadium, Cairns |
| NBL TV |

| 2 September 2017 | Cairns Taipans | 76–84 | Brisbane Bullets | CQUniversity North Indoor Sports Stadium, Rockhampton |
| NBL TV |

| 21 September 2017 | Cairns Taipans | 80–90 | Perth Wildcats | Early Settler Stadium, Cairns |
| NBL TV |

| 23 September 2017 | Cairns Taipans | 98–80 | Perth Wildcats | Early Settler Stadium, Cairns |
| NBL TV |

=== Illawarra Hawks pre-season ===
| 21 August 2017 | Illawarra Hawks | 88–60 | University of Texas | Alexandria Stadium, Sydney |
| NBL TV |

| 16 September 2017 | Illawarra Hawks | 71–75 | Sydney Kings | Beaton Park Stadium, Wollongong |
| NBL TV |

=== Melbourne United pre-season ===
| 17 May 2017 | Jiangsu Dragons | 72–85 | Melbourne United | Wutaishan Gymnasium, Nanjing, China |
| NBL TV |

| 19 May 2017 | Jiangsu Dragons | 56–63 | Melbourne United | Yancheng Sports Center, Yancheng, China |
| NBL TV |

| 16 July 2017 | Melbourne United | 104–94 (OT) | China | Margaret Court Arena, Melbourne |
| NBL TV | | | | Attendance: 6,888 |

| 16 August 2017 | Melbourne United | 85–75 | University of Texas | Nunawading Basketball Centre, Melbourne |
| NBL TV |

| 20 August 2017 | Melbourne United | 90–89 | University of Wisconsin | Casey Stadium, Melbourne |
| NBL TV | | | | Attendance: 1,500 |

| 8 October 2017 | Oklahoma City Thunder | 86–85 | Melbourne United | Chesapeake Energy Arena, Oklahoma City, USA |
| ESPN | | | | Attendance: 10,203 |

=== New Zealand Breakers pre-season ===
| 15 August 2017 | New Zealand Breakers | 75–85 | University of Wisconsin | Atlas Place, Auckland |
| NBL TV |

| 17 September 2017 | New Zealand Breakers | 88–86 | Melbourne United | Pettigrew Green Arena, Napier |
| NBL TV |

| 19 September 2017 | New Zealand Breakers | 62–101 | Melbourne United | TSB Stadium, New Plymouth |
| NBL TV |

| 27 September 2017 | New Zealand Breakers | 83–67 | Brisbane Bullets | ASB Arena, Tauranga |
| NBL TV |

=== Perth Wildcats pre-season ===
| 1 September 2017 | Perth Wildcats | 91–99 | Adelaide 36ers | Eaton Recreation Centre, Bunbury |
| NBL TV |

| 3 September 2017 | Perth Wildcats | 81–73 | Adelaide 36ers | Margaret River Recreation Centre, Margaret River |
| NBL TV |

=== Sydney Kings pre-season ===
2017 International Basketball Championships

| 18 July 2017 | USA All-Stars | 84–88 | Sydney Kings | Dushu Lake Sports Center, Suzhou, China |
| NBL TV |

| 19 July 2017 | Lithuania All-Stars | 70–83 | Sydney Kings | Dushu Lake Sports Center, Suzhou, China |
| NBL TV |

| 20 July 2017 | Qatar | 56–82 | Sydney Kings | Dushu Lake Sports Center, Suzhou, China |
| NBL TV |

==== Semi-final ====
| 22 July 2017 | Sydney Kings | 73–72 | Ukraine | Suzhou Sports Center, Suzhou, China |
| NBL TV |

==== Final ====
| 23 July 2017 | Lithuania All-Stars | 65–79 | Sydney Kings | Suzhou Sports Center, Suzhou, China |
| NBL TV |

Sydney Kings won the tournament.

| 10 August 2017 | Sydney Kings | 89–104 | University of Oklahoma | Penrith Valley Regional Sports Centre, Sydney |
| NBL TV |

| 17 August 2017 | Sydney Kings | 88–67 | American University | Whitlam Leisure Centre, Sydney |
| NBL TV |

| 22 August 2017 | Sydney Kings | 71–83 | University of Wisconsin | Bankstown Basketball Stadium, Sydney |
| NBL TV |

| 25 September 2017 | Sydney Kings | 77–88 | Perth Wildcats | Moss Vale Basketball Centre, Moss Vale |
| NBL TV |

| 27 September 2017 | Sydney Kings | 85–86 | Perth Wildcats | Qudos Bank Arena, Sydney |
| NBL TV |

| 2 October 2017 | Utah Jazz | 108–83 | Sydney Kings | Vivint Smart Home Arena, Salt Lake City, USA |
| ESPN2 | | | | Attendance: 15,692 |

=== 2017 NBL Blitz ===
A pre-season tournament featuring all eight teams was held on 7–9 September 2017 in Traralgon, Victoria and on 10 September 2017 in Melbourne. The winners received the fifth annual Loggins-Bruton Cup.

| 7 September 2017 | Melbourne United | 99–83 | Illawarra Hawks | Traralgon Sports Stadium, Traralgon |
| NBL TV |

| 7 September 2017 | Cairns Taipans | 75–77 | New Zealand Breakers | Traralgon Sports Stadium, Traralgon |
| NBL TV |

| 8 September 2017 | Perth Wildcats | 90–96 | Adelaide 36ers | Traralgon Sports Stadium, Traralgon |
| NBL TV |

| 8 September 2017 | Sydney Kings | 73–90 | Brisbane Bullets | Traralgon Sports Stadium, Traralgon |
| NBL TV |

| 9 September 2017 | Cairns Taipans | 71–93 | Illawarra Hawks | Traralgon Sports Stadium, Traralgon |
| NBL TV |

| 9 September 2017 | Brisbane Bullets | 101–92 | Adelaide 36ers | Traralgon Sports Stadium, Traralgon |
| NBL TV |

| 9 September 2017 | Melbourne United | 99–105 | Sydney Kings | Traralgon Sports Stadium, Traralgon |
| NBL TV |

| 9 September 2017 | Perth Wildcats | 80–72 | New Zealand Breakers | Traralgon Sports Stadium, Traralgon |
| NBL TV |

| 10 September 2017 | Melbourne United | 93–67 | Perth Wildcats | State Basketball Centre, Melbourne |
| NBL TV |

| 10 September 2017 | Sydney Kings | 80–96 | Illawarra Hawks | Kilsyth Stadium, Melbourne |
| NBL TV |

| 10 September 2017 | Cairns Taipans | 53–46 | Brisbane Bullets | Werribee Basketball Stadium, Melbourne |
| NBL TV |

| 10 September 2017 | New Zealand Breakers | 84–72 | Adelaide 36ers | Mill Park Basketball Stadium, Melbourne |
| NBL TV |

Melbourne United won the 2017 NBL Blitz championship.

== Regular season ==
=== Round 1 ===
| 5 October 2017 | Adelaide 36ers | 97–99 | Melbourne United | Titanium Security Arena, Adelaide |
| 19:00 | Scoring by quarter: 27–18, 20–27, 27–40, 23–14 |
| Fox Sports | | boxscore | | Attendance: 6,312 |

| 6 October 2017 | Cairns Taipans | 88–87 | Illawarra Hawks | Cairns Convention Centre, Cairns |
| 18:30 | Scoring by quarter: 27–26, 15–20, 20–20, 26–21 |
| Fox Sports | | boxscore | | Attendance: 3,969 |

| 7 October 2017 | Sydney Kings | 96–105 | Adelaide 36ers | Qudos Bank Arena, Sydney |
| 17:30 | Scoring by quarter: 22–26, 28–20, 18–27, 28–32 |
| Fox Sports | | boxscore | | Attendance: 7,035 |

| 7 October 2017 | Perth Wildcats | 96–86 | Brisbane Bullets | Perth Arena, Perth |
| 17:30 | Scoring by quarter: 24–18, 25–21, 20–21, 27–26 |
| Fox Sports | | boxscore | | Attendance: 13,403 |

| 8 October 2017 | New Zealand Breakers | 71–82 | Cairns Taipans | Spark Arena, Auckland |
| 17:00 | Scoring by quarter: 21–18, 22–21, 12–25, 16–18 |
| Sky Sport | | boxscore | | Attendance: not available |

=== Round 2 ===
| 12 October 2017 | Cairns Taipans | 70–96 | Adelaide 36ers | Cairns Convention Centre, Cairns |
| 18:30 | Scoring by quarter: 24–29, 19–20, 13–23, 14–24 |
| Fox Sports | | boxscore | | Attendance: not available |

| 13 October 2017 | New Zealand Breakers | 87–85 | Sydney Kings | Spark Arena, Auckland |
| 19:30 | Scoring by quarter: 26–29, 28–12, 15–22, 18–22 |
| Sky Sport | | boxscore | | Attendance: 4,700 |

| 13 October 2017 | Perth Wildcats | 74–64 | Illawarra Hawks | Perth Arena, Perth |
| 18:30 | Scoring by quarter: 18–21, 19–22, 15–7, 22–14 |
| Fox Sports | | boxscore | | Attendance: 11,539 |

| 14 October 2017 | Adelaide 36ers | 79–99 | Melbourne United | Titanium Security Arena, Adelaide |
| 17:00 | Scoring by quarter: 14–29, 34–25, 22–23, 9–22 |
| Fox Sports | | boxscore | | Attendance: not available |

| 15 October 2017 | Sydney Kings | 103–87 | Illawarra Hawks | Qudos Bank Arena, Sydney |
| 15:00 | Scoring by quarter: 30–23, 25–24, 29–23, 19–17 |
| Fox Sports | | boxscore | | Attendance: 6,403 |

=== Round 3 ===
| 19 October 2017 | New Zealand Breakers | 90–73 | Sydney Kings | Spark Arena, Auckland |
| 19:30 | Scoring by quarter: 24–19, 31–12, 23–20, 12–22 |
| Sky Sport | | boxscore | | Attendance: 3,679 |

| 20 October 2017 | Brisbane Bullets | 83–78 | Cairns Taipans | Brisbane Entertainment Centre, Brisbane |
| 18:30 | Scoring by quarter: 31–27, 21–22, 16–10, 15–19 |
| Fox Sports | | boxscore | | Attendance: 5,430 |

| 20 October 2017 | Perth Wildcats | 89–84 | Melbourne United | Perth Arena, Perth |
| 18:30 | Scoring by quarter: 20–21, 23–23, 28–19, 18–21 |
| Fox Sports | | boxscore | | Attendance: 13,037 |

| 21 October 2017 | Adelaide 36ers | 114–84 | Sydney Kings | Titanium Security Arena, Adelaide |
| 17:00 | Scoring by quarter: 38–24, 31–26, 27–11, 18–23 |
| Fox Sports | | boxscore | | Attendance: 5,970 |

| 22 October 2017 | Melbourne United | 76–88 | New Zealand Breakers | Hisense Arena, Melbourne |
| 15:00 | Scoring by quarter: 22–22, 21–23, 17–27, 16–16 |
| Fox Sports | | boxscore | | Attendance: 10,300 |

| 22 October 2017 | Illawarra Hawks | 105–96 | Brisbane Bullets | WIN Entertainment Centre, Wollongong |
| 17:00 | Scoring by quarter: 17–32, 28–23, 39–16, 21–25 |
| Fox Sports | | boxscore | | Attendance: not available |

| 22 October 2017 | Cairns Taipans | 90–69 | Perth Wildcats | Cairns Convention Centre, Cairns |
| 18:00 | Scoring by quarter: 21–15, 22–18, 29–15, 18–21 |
| Fox Sports | | boxscore | | Attendance: 4,062 |

=== Round 4 ===
| 26 October 2017 | Brisbane Bullets | 96–101 | New Zealand Breakers | Brisbane Convention Centre, Brisbane |
| 18:30 | Scoring by quarter: 23–24, 27–25, 23–24, 23–28 |
| Fox Sports | | boxscore | | Attendance: not available |

| 26 October 2017 | Perth Wildcats | 105–74 | Illawarra Hawks | Perth Arena, Perth |
| 18:30 | Scoring by quarter: 34–18, 20–19, 20–11, 31–26 |
| Fox Sports | | boxscore | | Attendance: 12,834 |

| 27 October 2017 | Cairns Taipans | 80–84 | Adelaide 36ers | Cairns Convention Centre, Cairns |
| 18:30 | Scoring by quarter: 19–26, 23–14, 11–20, 27–24 |
| Fox Sports | | boxscore | | Attendance: 4,053 |

| 28 October 2017 | Brisbane Bullets | 87–85 | Melbourne United | Carrara Stadium, Gold Coast |
| 16:30 | Scoring by quarter: 21–15, 25–29, 27–13, 14–28 |
| Fox Sports | | boxscore | | Attendance: not available |

| 29 October 2017 | Illawarra Hawks | 94–99(OT) | Sydney Kings | WIN Entertainment Centre, Wollongong |
| 15:00 | Scoring by quarter: 23–19, 22–29, 24–22, 19–18, Overtime: 6–11 |
| Fox Sports | | boxscore | | Attendance: 2,892 |

=== Round 5 ===
| 2 November 2017 | New Zealand Breakers | 92–88 | Adelaide 36ers | North Shore Events Centre, Auckland |
| 19:30 | Scoring by quarter: 22–21, 27–19, 22–24, 21–24 |
| Sky Sport | | boxscore | | Attendance: 2,732 |

| 2 November 2017 | Melbourne United | 87–65 | Cairns Taipans | Hisense Arena, Melbourne |
| 19:30 | Scoring by quarter: 31–23, 17–13, 21–16, 18–13 |
| Fox Sports | | boxscore | | Attendance: 6,542 |

| 3 November 2017 | Brisbane Bullets | 81–112 | Illawarra Hawks | Brisbane Convention Centre, Brisbane |
| 18:30 | Scoring by quarter: 21–23, 18–33, 21–22, 21–34 |
| Fox Sports | | boxscore | | Attendance: 2,640 |

| 3 November 2017 | Perth Wildcats | 93–69 | Sydney Kings | Perth Arena, Perth |
| 18:30 | Scoring by quarter: 27–15, 21–17, 24–16, 21–21 |
| Fox Sports | | boxscore | | Attendance: 13,039 |

| 4 November 2017 | Melbourne United | 101–84 | Adelaide 36ers | Hisense Arena, Melbourne |
| 17:30 | Scoring by quarter: 21–30, 26–17, 29–13, 25–24 |
| Fox Sports | | boxscore | | Attendance: 8,213 |

| 4 November 2017 | Cairns Taipans | 70–73 | New Zealand Breakers | Cairns Convention Centre, Cairns |
| 18:30 | Scoring by quarter: 25–21, 18–20, 15–14, 12–18 |
| Fox Sports | | boxscore | | Attendance: 4,201 |

| 5 November 2017 | Sydney Kings | 83–93 | Illawarra Hawks | Qudos Bank Arena, Sydney |
| 15:00 | Scoring by quarter: 20–21, 24–22, 21–21, 18–29 |
| Fox Sports | | boxscore | | Attendance: 7,210 |

=== Round 6 ===
| 9 November 2017 | New Zealand Breakers | 88–84 | Perth Wildcats | Spark Arena, Auckland |
| 19:30 | Scoring by quarter: 23–17, 18–21, 21–17, 26–29 |
| Sky Sport | | boxscore | | Attendance: 4,297 |

| 9 November 2017 | Cairns Taipans | 92–69 | Melbourne United | Cairns Convention Centre, Cairns |
| 18:30 | Scoring by quarter: 25–23, 21–19, 18–15, 28–12 |
| Fox Sports | | boxscore | | Attendance: 3,891 |

| 11 November 2017 | Melbourne United | 108–90 | Sydney Kings | Hisense Arena, Melbourne |
| 17:30 | Scoring by quarter: 21–23, 29–24, 29–25, 29–18 |
| Fox Sports | | boxscore | | Attendance: 8,196 |

| 11 November 2017 | Adelaide 36ers | 87–96 | Illawarra Hawks | Titanium Security Arena, Adelaide |
| 19:00 | Scoring by quarter: 30–20, 20–19, 22–24, 15–33 |
| Fox Sports | | boxscore | | Attendance: not available |

| 12 November 2017 | Brisbane Bullets | 82–74 | Cairns Taipans | Brisbane Convention Centre, Brisbane |
| 14:00 | Scoring by quarter: 18–15, 15–9, 16–25, 33–25 |
| Fox Sports | | boxscore | | Attendance: 3,002 |

| 12 November 2017 | Perth Wildcats | 82–88 | New Zealand Breakers | Perth Arena, Perth |
| 16:00 | Scoring by quarter: 21–23, 20–16, 17–21, 24–28 |
| Fox Sports | | boxscore | | Attendance: 13,523 |

=== Round 7 ===
| 16 November 2017 | Illawarra Hawks | 97–93(OT) | Sydney Kings | WIN Entertainment Centre, Wollongong |
| 19:30 | Scoring by quarter: 14–25, 17–21, 25–26, 24–8, Overtime: 17–13 |
| Fox Sports | | boxscore | | Attendance: 2,396 |

| 17 November 2017 | Brisbane Bullets | 85–90 | Perth Wildcats | Brisbane Entertainment Centre, Brisbane |
| 18:30 | Scoring by quarter: 16–19, 21–21, 21–27, 27–23 |
| Fox Sports | | boxscore | | Attendance: 4,602 |

| 18 November 2017 | Adelaide 36ers | 108–93 | Sydney Kings | Titanium Security Arena, Adelaide |
| 17:00 | Scoring by quarter: 25–28, 35–25, 23–16, 25–24 |
| Fox Sports | | boxscore | | Attendance: 6,093 |

| 18 November 2017 | Cairns Taipans | 87–66 | Illawarra Hawks | Cairns Convention Centre, Cairns |
| 18:30 | Scoring by quarter: 34–25, 20–17, 14–10, 19–14 |
| Fox Sports | | boxscore | | Attendance: 4,247 |

| 19 November 2017 | New Zealand Breakers | 90–82 | Brisbane Bullets | Spark Arena, Auckland |
| 15:00 | Scoring by quarter: 16–16, 19–18, 26–24, 29–24 |
| Sky Sport | | boxscore | | Attendance: 5,715 |

| 19 November 2017 | Melbourne United | 59–91 | Perth Wildcats | Hisense Arena, Melbourne |
| 15:00 | Scoring by quarter: 24–19, 9–30, 14–23, 12–19 |
| Fox Sports | | boxscore | | Attendance: 10,300 |

=== Round 8 ===
| 30 November 2017 | Sydney Kings | 81–72 | Cairns Taipans | Qudos Bank Arena, Sydney |
| 19:30 | Scoring by quarter: 27–21, 24–11, 18–28, 12–12 |
| Fox Sports | | boxscore | | Attendance: 4,013 |

| 1 December 2017 | New Zealand Breakers | 73–89 | Perth Wildcats | North Shore Events Centre, Auckland |
| 19:30 | Scoring by quarter: 19–21, 17–14, 16–24, 21–30 |
| Sky Sport | | boxscore | | Attendance: 3,643 |

| 1 December 2017 | Adelaide 36ers | 84–83 | Brisbane Bullets | Titanium Security Arena, Adelaide |
| 19:00 | Scoring by quarter: 24–25, 21–24, 16–15, 23–19 |
| Fox Sports | | boxscore | | Attendance: not available |

| 2 December 2017 | Cairns Taipans | 80–71 | Sydney Kings | Cairns Convention Centre, Cairns |
| 16:30 | Scoring by quarter: 12–17, 23–19, 16–21, 29–14 |
| Fox Sports | | boxscore | | Attendance: 4,052 |

| 3 December 2017 | Brisbane Bullets | 81–76 | New Zealand Breakers | Brisbane Convention Centre, Brisbane |
| 14:00 | Scoring by quarter: 20–15, 24–21, 18–16, 19–24 |
| Fox Sports | | boxscore | | Attendance: 2,925 |

| 4 December 2017 | Melbourne United | 91–73 | Illawarra Hawks | Hisense Arena, Melbourne |
| 19:30 | Scoring by quarter: 22–20, 24–22, 22–8, 23–23 |
| Fox Sports | | boxscore | | Attendance: 6,054 |

=== Round 9 ===
| 7 December 2017 | New Zealand Breakers | 96–89 | Brisbane Bullets | Spark Arena, Auckland |
| 19:30 | Scoring by quarter: 24–23, 25–24, 24–22, 23–20 |
| Sky Sport | | boxscore | | Attendance: 5,111 |

| 8 December 2017 | Perth Wildcats | 88–79 | Adelaide 36ers | Perth Arena, Perth |
| 18:30 | Scoring by quarter: 27–16, 18–18, 14–21, 29–24 |
| Fox Sports | | boxscore | | Attendance: 13,239 |

| 9 December 2017 | Sydney Kings | 77–85 | Brisbane Bullets | Qudos Bank Arena, Sydney |
| 17:30 | Scoring by quarter: 17–17, 24–23, 19–23, 17–22 |
| Fox Sports | | boxscore | | Attendance: 6,564 |

| 9 December 2017 | Cairns Taipans | 79–70 | Melbourne United | Cairns Convention Centre, Cairns |
| 18:30 | Scoring by quarter: 22–15, 20–22, 17–14, 20–19 |
| Fox Sports | | boxscore | | Attendance: 4,151 |

| 10 December 2017 | Illawarra Hawks | 91–99 | Perth Wildcats | WIN Entertainment Centre, Wollongong |
| 15:00 | Scoring by quarter: 24–25, 20–21, 20–25, 27–28 |
| Fox Sports | | boxscore | | Attendance: 2,580 |

| 10 December 2017 | Adelaide 36ers | 95–92 | New Zealand Breakers | Titanium Security Arena, Adelaide |
| 16:30 | Scoring by quarter: 29–23, 23–21, 28–24, 15–24 |
| Fox Sports | | boxscore | | Attendance: not available |

| 11 December 2017 | Melbourne United | 95–69 | Sydney Kings | Hisense Arena, Melbourne |
| 19:30 | Scoring by quarter: 25–21, 24–15, 21–20, 25–15 |
| Fox Sports | | boxscore | | Attendance: 8,194 |

=== Round 10 ===
| 14 December 2017 | Cairns Taipans | 74–75 | Brisbane Bullets | Cairns Convention Centre, Cairns |
| 18:30 | Scoring by quarter: 15–12, 13–19, 26–23, 20–21 |
| Fox Sports | | boxscore | | Attendance: 4,245 |

| 15 December 2017 | New Zealand Breakers | 75–90 | Adelaide 36ers | Spark Arena, Auckland |
| 19:30 | Scoring by quarter: 21–19, 25–20, 18–17, 11–34 |
| Sky Sport | | boxscore | | Attendance: 4,910 |

| 16 December 2017 | Perth Wildcats | 76–82 | Brisbane Bullets | Perth Arena, Perth |
| 14:30 | Scoring by quarter: 24–33, 23–17, 13–12, 16–20 |
| Fox Sports | | boxscore | | Attendance: 13,329 |

| 16 December 2017 | Illawarra Hawks | 78–84 | Melbourne United | WIN Entertainment Centre, Wollongong |
| 19:30 | Scoring by quarter: 28–32, 11–19, 17–10, 22–23 |
| Fox Sports | | boxscore | | Attendance: 2,150 |

| 17 December 2017 | Sydney Kings | 88–69 | Cairns Taipans | Qudos Bank Arena, Sydney |
| 15:00 | Scoring by quarter: 14–23, 26–15, 30–14, 18–17 |
| Fox Sports | | boxscore | | Attendance: 4,380 |

=== Round 11 ===
| 21 December 2017 | Sydney Kings | 95–98 | New Zealand Breakers | Qudos Bank Arena, Sydney |
| 19:30 | Scoring by quarter: 25–24, 23–19, 21–28, 26–27 |
| Fox Sports | | boxscore | | Attendance: 4,635 |

| 22 December 2017 | Melbourne United | 99–91 | Adelaide 36ers | Hisense Arena, Melbourne |
| 19:30 | Scoring by quarter: 24–20, 22–12, 25–28, 28–31 |
| Fox Sports | | boxscore | | Attendance: 8,089 |

| 23 December 2017 | Brisbane Bullets | 95–101 | Sydney Kings | Brisbane Convention Centre, Brisbane |
| 16:30 | Scoring by quarter: 26–20, 23–27, 30–25, 16–29 |
| Fox Sports | | boxscore | | Attendance: 3,235 |

| 23 December 2017 | Illawarra Hawks | 96–84 | Perth Wildcats | WIN Entertainment Centre, Wollongong |
| 19:30 | Scoring by quarter: 18–30, 32–19, 21–17, 25–18 |
| Fox Sports | | boxscore | | Attendance: 2,346 |

| 24 December 2017 | Adelaide 36ers | 75–94 | Cairns Taipans | Titanium Security Arena, Adelaide |
| 14:30 | Scoring by quarter: 18–28, 15–14, 17–27, 25–25 |
| Fox Sports | | boxscore | | Attendance: not available |

=== Round 12 ===
| 26 December 2017 | Melbourne United | 69–68 | Brisbane Bullets | Hisense Arena, Melbourne |
| 19:30 | Scoring by quarter: 14–24, 18–18, 19–12, 18–14 |
| Fox Sports | | boxscore | | Attendance: 10,300 |

| 28 December 2017 | Illawarra Hawks | 106–102 | Cairns Taipans | WIN Entertainment Centre, Wollongong |
| 19:30 | Scoring by quarter: 31–27, 25–25, 25–30, 25–20 |
| Fox Sports | | boxscore | | Attendance: 2,871 |

| 29 December 2017 | Adelaide 36ers | 88–85 | New Zealand Breakers | Titanium Security Arena, Adelaide |
| 19:00 | Scoring by quarter: 25–17, 24–21, 19–23, 20–24 |
| Fox Sports | | boxscore | | Attendance: 7,201 |

| 30 December 2017 | Sydney Kings | 79–103 | Melbourne United | Qudos Bank Arena, Sydney |
| 17:30 | Scoring by quarter: 23–24, 23–20, 13–28, 20–31 |
| Fox Sports | | boxscore | | Attendance: 6,014 |

| 31 December 2017 | Illawarra Hawks | 104–82 | Brisbane Bullets | WIN Entertainment Centre, Wollongong |
| 15:00 | Scoring by quarter: 32–24, 22–26, 27–22, 23–10 |
| Fox Sports | | boxscore | | Attendance: 3,396 |

| 31 December 2017 | Cairns Taipans | 68–83 | Perth Wildcats | Cairns Convention Centre, Cairns |
| 18:00 | Scoring by quarter: 18–32, 15–14, 16–12, 19–25 |
| Fox Sports | | boxscore | | Attendance: 5,190 |

=== Round 13 ===
| 4 January 2018 | Adelaide 36ers | 97–86 | Perth Wildcats | Titanium Security Arena, Adelaide |
| 19:00 | Scoring by quarter: 20–23, 31–17, 14–27, 32–19 |
| Fox Sports | | boxscore | | Attendance: not available |

| 5 January 2018 | Cairns Taipans | 83–80 | Brisbane Bullets | Cairns Convention Centre, Cairns |
| 18:30 | Scoring by quarter: 22–20, 23–18, 25–20, 13–22 |
| Fox Sports | | boxscore | | Attendance: 4,264 |

| 6 January 2018 | Sydney Kings | 68–76 | Perth Wildcats | Qudos Bank Arena, Sydney |
| 17:30 | Scoring by quarter: 19–22, 15–23, 21–14, 13–17 |
| Fox Sports | | boxscore | | Attendance: 5,822 |

| 6 January 2018 | Illawarra Hawks | 77–79 | Melbourne United | WIN Entertainment Centre, Wollongong |
| 19:30 | Scoring by quarter: 24–17, 24–19, 17–20, 12–23 |
| Fox Sports | | boxscore | | Attendance: 2,869 |

| 7 January 2018 | New Zealand Breakers | 82–69 | Cairns Taipans | Spark Arena, Auckland |
| 15:00 | Scoring by quarter: 22–18, 25–19, 13–14, 22–18 |
| Sky Sport | | boxscore | | Attendance: 5,793 |

| 7 January 2018 | Brisbane Bullets | 84–95(OT) | Adelaide 36ers | Brisbane Convention Centre, Brisbane |
| 14:00 | Scoring by quarter: 13–23, 31–18, 17–19, 18–19, Overtime: 5–16 |
| Fox Sports | | boxscore | | Attendance: 5,000 |

=== Round 14 ===
| 11 January 2018 | Adelaide 36ers | 100–90 | Cairns Taipans | Titanium Security Arena, Adelaide |
| 19:00 | Scoring by quarter: 30–22, 24–24, 24–21, 22–23 |
| Fox Sports | | boxscore | | Attendance: not available |

| 12 January 2018 | Perth Wildcats | 80–82 | Melbourne United | Perth Arena, Perth |
| 18:30 | Scoring by quarter: 21–26, 19–17, 15–25, 25–14 |
| Fox Sports | | boxscore | | Attendance: 13,611 |

| 13 January 2018 | Sydney Kings | 101–104 | Adelaide 36ers | Qudos Bank Arena, Sydney |
| 17:30 | Scoring by quarter: 28–28, 30–24, 15–19, 28–33 |
| Fox Sports | | boxscore | | Attendance: 6,023 |

| 13 January 2018 | Illawarra Hawks | 90–79 | New Zealand Breakers | WIN Entertainment Centre, Wollongong |
| 19:30 | Scoring by quarter: 18–21, 28–23, 14–14, 30–21 |
| Fox Sports | | boxscore | | Attendance: 2,836 |

| 14 January 2018 | Brisbane Bullets | 80–81 | Perth Wildcats | Brisbane Convention Centre, Brisbane |
| 14:00 | Scoring by quarter: 28–16, 19–16, 15–25, 18–24 |
| Fox Sports | | boxscore | | Attendance: 3,152 |

=== Round 15 ===
| 18 January 2018 | New Zealand Breakers | 98–81 | Melbourne United | North Shore Events Centre, Auckland |
| 19:30 | Scoring by quarter: 34–22, 26–19, 16–27, 22–13 |
| Sky Sport | | boxscore | | Attendance: not available |

| 19 January 2018 | Adelaide 36ers | 112–90 | Illawarra Hawks | Titanium Security Arena, Adelaide |
| 19:00 | Scoring by quarter: 32–25, 32–20, 25–20, 23–25 |
| Fox Sports | | boxscore | | Attendance: not available |

| 19 January 2018 | Perth Wildcats | 77–84 | Sydney Kings | Perth Arena, Perth |
| 18:30 | Scoring by quarter: 11–20, 16–19, 24–17, 26–28 |
| Fox Sports | | boxscore | | Attendance: 13,502 |

| 20 January 2018 | Brisbane Bullets | 95–103 | Melbourne United | Brisbane Entertainment Centre, Brisbane |
| 16:30 | Scoring by quarter: 21–21, 27–26, 24–36, 23–20 |
| Fox Sports | | boxscore | | Attendance: 4,650 |

| 20 January 2018 | Cairns Taipans | 81–71 | New Zealand Breakers | Cairns Convention Centre, Cairns |
| 18:30 | Scoring by quarter: 22–15, 19–22, 13–20, 27–14 |
| Fox Sports | | boxscore | | Attendance: 4,527 |

| 21 January 2018 | Sydney Kings | 84–56 | Perth Wildcats | Qudos Bank Arena, Sydney |
| 15:00 | Scoring by quarter: 22–19, 21–16, 22–10, 19–11 |
| Fox Sports | | boxscore | | Attendance: 5,382 |

| 21 January 2018 | Illawarra Hawks | 93–112 | Adelaide 36ers | WIN Entertainment Centre, Wollongong |
| 17:00 | Scoring by quarter: 30–39, 19–27, 30–24, 14–22 |
| Fox Sports | | boxscore | | Attendance: 2,526 |

=== Round 16 ===
| 24 January 2018 | Melbourne United | 79–68 | Cairns Taipans | Hisense Arena, Melbourne |
| 19:30 | Scoring by quarter: 21–13, 14–12, 16–22, 28–21 |
| Fox Sports | | boxscore | | Attendance: 7,306 |

| 27 January 2018 | Brisbane Bullets | 95–90 | Adelaide 36ers | Brisbane Convention Centre, Brisbane |
| 16:30 | Scoring by quarter: 18–23, 24–24, 23–16, 30–27 |
| Fox Sports | | boxscore | | Attendance: 3,360 |

| 27 January 2018 | Perth Wildcats | 90–76 | New Zealand Breakers | Perth Arena, Perth |
| 17:30 | Scoring by quarter: 22–20, 26–23, 23–17, 19–13 |
| Fox Sports | | boxscore | | Attendance: 13,536 |

| 28 January 2018 | Sydney Kings | 76–93 | Melbourne United | Qudos Bank Arena, Sydney |
| 15:00 | Scoring by quarter: 18–23, 17–20, 21–20, 20–30 |
| Fox Sports | | boxscore | | Attendance: 7,407 |

| 28 January 2018 | Illawarra Hawks | 88–78 | Cairns Taipans | WIN Entertainment Centre, Wollongong |
| 17:00 | Scoring by quarter: 23–15, 24–17, 22–19, 19–27 |
| Fox Sports | | boxscore | | Attendance: 2,234 |

=== Round 17 ===
| 2 February 2018 | Illawarra Hawks | 73–77 | New Zealand Breakers | WIN Entertainment Centre, Wollongong |
| 19:30 | Scoring by quarter: 20–17, 15–13, 20–23, 18–24 |
| Fox Sports | | boxscore | | Attendance: 2,254 |

| 2 February 2018 | Perth Wildcats | 111–90 | Adelaide 36ers | Perth Arena, Perth |
| 18:30 | Scoring by quarter: 28–36, 32–25, 27–9, 24–20 |
| Fox Sports | | boxscore | | Attendance: 12,490 |

| 3 February 2018 | Melbourne United | 69–61 | Brisbane Bullets | Hisense Arena, Melbourne |
| 17:30 | Scoring by quarter: 10–5, 18–20, 21–16, 20–20 |
| Fox Sports | | boxscore | | Attendance: 10,300 |

| 3 February 2018 | Cairns Taipans | 86–93 | Sydney Kings | Cairns Convention Centre, Cairns |
| 18:30 | Scoring by quarter: 22–29, 22–24, 20–23, 22–17 |
| Fox Sports | | boxscore | | Attendance: 5,126 |

| 4 February 2018 | New Zealand Breakers | 88–84 | Illawarra Hawks | Spark Arena, Auckland |
| 15:00 | Scoring by quarter: 21–26, 24–19, 20–23, 23–16 |
| Sky Sport | | boxscore | | Attendance: 5,279 |

| 4 February 2018 | Adelaide 36ers | 94–82 | Perth Wildcats | Titanium Security Arena, Adelaide |
| 14:30 | Scoring by quarter: 31–17, 24–16, 24–23, 15–26 |
| Fox Sports | | boxscore | | Attendance: 6,000 |

=== Round 18 ===
| 8 February 2018 | Brisbane Bullets | 99–91 | Illawarra Hawks | Brisbane Convention Centre, Brisbane |
| 18:30 | Scoring by quarter: 30–19, 24–17, 23–22, 22–33 |
| Fox Sports | | boxscore | | Attendance: 2,483 |

| 9 February 2018 | Melbourne United | 89–83 | New Zealand Breakers | Hisense Arena, Melbourne |
| 19:30 | Scoring by quarter: 24–31, 26–23, 21–17, 18–12 |
| Fox Sports | | boxscore | | Attendance: 7,256 |

| 9 February 2018 | Perth Wildcats | 83–85 | Cairns Taipans | Perth Arena, Perth |
| 18:30 | Scoring by quarter: 21–26, 23–20, 16–21, 23–18 |
| Fox Sports | | boxscore | | Attendance: 13,040 |

| 10 February 2018 | Sydney Kings | 92–80 | Brisbane Bullets | Qudos Bank Arena, Sydney |
| 17:30 | Scoring by quarter: 23–22, 22–13, 19–28, 28–17 |
| Fox Sports | | boxscore | | Attendance: 9,201 |

| 11 February 2018 | New Zealand Breakers | 82–100 | Melbourne United | Spark Arena, Auckland |
| 15:00 | Scoring by quarter: 30–25, 11–21, 17–27, 24–27 |
| Sky Sport | | boxscore | | Attendance: 5,000 |

| 11 February 2018 | Illawarra Hawks | 87–111 | Adelaide 36ers | WIN Entertainment Centre, Wollongong |
| 15:00 | Scoring by quarter: 32–29, 16–28, 24–19, 15–35 |
| Fox Sports | | boxscore | | Attendance: 2,132 |

=== Round 19 ===
| 15 February 2018 | Brisbane Bullets | 73–90 | Sydney Kings | Brisbane Entertainment Centre, Brisbane |
| 18:30 | Scoring by quarter: 23–20, 12–26, 22–26, 16–18 |
| Fox Sports | | boxscore | | Attendance: 5,224 |

| 16 February 2018 | New Zealand Breakers | 82–84 | Illawarra Hawks | North Shore Events Centre, Auckland |
| 19:30 | Scoring by quarter: 25–15, 25–19, 19–19, 13–31 |
| Sky Sport | | boxscore | | Attendance: 3,187 |

| 16 February 2018 | Melbourne United | 97–85 | Perth Wildcats | Hisense Arena, Melbourne |
| 19:30 | Scoring by quarter: 24–15, 22–26, 26–24, 25–20 |
| Fox Sports | | boxscore | | Attendance: 7,064 |

| 17 February 2018 | Adelaide 36ers | 105–82 | Brisbane Bullets | Titanium Security Arena, Adelaide |
| 17:00 | Scoring by quarter: 30–28, 29–12, 20–16, 26–26 |
| Fox Sports | | boxscore | | Attendance: 7,163 |

| 18 February 2018 | Melbourne United | 84–94 | Illawarra Hawks | Hisense Arena, Melbourne |
| 15:00 | Scoring by quarter: 23–26, 28–25, 19–21, 14–22 |
| Fox Sports | | boxscore | | Attendance: 7,981 |

| 18 February 2018 | Sydney Kings | 101–86 | New Zealand Breakers | Qudos Bank Arena, Sydney |
| 17:00 | Scoring by quarter: 14–17, 28–31, 26–20, 33–18 |
| Fox Sports | | boxscore | | Attendance: 8,411 |

| 18 February 2018 | Perth Wildcats | 89–61 | Cairns Taipans | Perth Arena, Perth |
| 16:00 | Scoring by quarter: 20–19, 27–11, 21–10, 21–21 |
| Fox Sports | | boxscore | | Attendance: 13,567 |

== Ladder ==
| Pos | 2017–18 NBL season | | | | | | | | | | | |
| Pos | Team | Pld | W | L | PCT | Last 5 | Streak | Home | Away | PF | PA | PP |
|---|---|---|---|---|---|---|---|---|---|---|---|---|
| 1 | Melbourne United | 28 | 20 | 8 | 71.43% | 4–1 | L1 | 11–3 | 9–5 | 2434 | 2298 | 105.92% |
| 2 | Adelaide 36ers | 28 | 18 | 10 | 64.29% | 3–2 | W3 | 10–4 | 8–6 | 2654 | 2527 | 105.03% |
| 3 | Perth Wildcats | 28 | 16 | 12 | 57.14% | 2–3 | W1 | 9–5 | 7–7 | 2388 | 2271 | 105.15% |
| 4 | New Zealand Breakers | 28 | 15 | 13 | 53.57% | 1–4 | L4 | 9–5 | 6–8 | 2364 | 2387 | 99.04% |
| 5 | Illawarra Hawks | 28 | 12 | 16 | 42.86% | 2–3 | W2 | 7–7 | 5–9 | 2474 | 2539 | 97.44% |
| 6 | Cairns Taipans^{1} | 28 | 11 | 17 | 39.29% | 1–4 | L1 | 8–6 | 3–11 | 2215 | 2281 | 97.11% |
| 7 | Sydney Kings^{1} | 28 | 11 | 17 | 39.29% | 4–1 | W4 | 6–8 | 5–9 | 2418 | 2504 | 96.57% |
| 8 | Brisbane Bullets | 28 | 9 | 19 | 32.14% | 1–4 | L3 | 6–8 | 3–11 | 2347 | 2487 | 94.37% |

Updated to match(es) played on 18 February 2018. Source: NBL.com.au

The NBL tie-breaker system as outlined in the NBL Rules and Regulations states that in the case of an identical win–loss record, the overall points percentage between the teams will determine order of seeding.

^{1}Cairns Taipans won on overall points percentage.

=== Ladder Progression ===
- Numbers highlighted in green indicate that the team finished the round inside the top four.
- Numbers highlighted in blue indicates the team finished first on the ladder in that round.
- Numbers highlighted in red indicates the team finished last place on the ladder in that round.

2017–18 NBL season
| Team | 1 | 2 | 3 | 4 | 5 | 6 | 7 | 8 | 9 | 10 | 11 | 12 | 13 | 14 | 15 | 16 | 17 | 18 | 19 |
|---|---|---|---|---|---|---|---|---|---|---|---|---|---|---|---|---|---|---|---|
| Adelaide 36ers | 4 | 4 | 3 | 3 | 4 | 4 | 3 | 3 | 4 | 4 | 4 | 4 | 4 | 4 | 2 | 2 | 3 | 2 | 2 |
| Brisbane Bullets | 7 | 7 | 6 | 6 | 7 | 6 | 7 | 7 | 6 | 5 | 6 | 7 | 7 | 7 | 7 | 7 | 7 | 7 | 8 |
| Cairns Taipans | 1 | 3 | 4 | 4 | 6 | 7 | 5 | 5 | 5 | 6 | 5 | 6 | 6 | 6 | 5 | 6 | 6 | 5 | 6 |
| Illawarra Hawks | 5 | 8 | 7 | 8 | 5 | 5 | 6 | 6 | 7 | 7 | 7 | 5 | 5 | 5 | 6 | 5 | 5 | 6 | 5 |
| Melbourne United | 3 | 2 | 5 | 5 | 3 | 3 | 4 | 4 | 3 | 3 | 3 | 2 | 2 | 1 | 1 | 1 | 1 | 1 | 1 |
| New Zealand Breakers | 8 | 5 | 1 | 2 | 1 | 1 | 1 | 1 | 2 | 2 | 1 | 3 | 3 | 3 | 3 | 4 | 2 | 4 | 4 |
| Perth Wildcats | 2 | 1 | 2 | 1 | 2 | 2 | 2 | 2 | 1 | 1 | 2 | 1 | 1 | 2 | 4 | 3 | 4 | 3 | 3 |
| Sydney Kings | 6 | 6 | 8 | 7 | 8 | 8 | 8 | 8 | 8 | 8 | 8 | 8 | 8 | 8 | 8 | 8 | 8 | 8 | 7 |

== Finals ==
The 2017–18 National Basketball League Finals were played in March 2018, consisting of two best-of-three semi-final series and the best-of-five Grand Final series. In the semi-finals, the higher seed hosted the first and third games. In the Grand Final, the higher seed hosted the first, third and fifth games.

=== Playoff Seedings ===
1. Melbourne United
2. Adelaide 36ers
3. Perth Wildcats
4. New Zealand Breakers

The NBL tie-breaker system as outlined in the NBL Rules and Regulations states that in the case of an identical win–loss record, the overall points percentage will determine order of seeding.

=== Playoff bracket ===
Semifinals
1 | Melbourne United | 88 | 88 | X
4 | New Zealand Breakers | 77 | 86 | X
2 | Adelaide 36ers | 109 | 89 | X
3 | Perth Wildcats | 74 | 88 | X

Grand Final
1 | Melbourne United | 107 | 95 | 101 | 81 | 100
2 | Adelaide 36ers | 96 | 110 | 98 | 90 | 82

=== Semi-finals ===
(1) Melbourne United vs. (4) New Zealand Breakers

| 3 March 2018 | Melbourne United | 88–77 (Series: Melbourne leads series, 1–0) | New Zealand Breakers | Hisense Arena, Melbourne |
| 17:30 EDT | Scoring by quarter: 21–24, 22–19, 24–18, 21–16 |
| Fox Sports | Pts: Ware 33; Rebs: Boone 8 Asts: Wesley 4 | boxscore | Pts: Newbill 19; Rebs: Pledger 10; Asts: Ili 5 | Attendance: 6,833; Referees: Michael Aylen, Matt Townsend, Jon Chapman |

| 5 March 2018 | New Zealand Breakers | 86–88(OT) (Series: Melbourne wins series, 2–0) | Melbourne United | Spark Arena, Auckland |
| 19:30pm NZDT | Scoring by quarter: 26–13, 12–20, 25–25, 15–20, Overtime: 8–10 |
| Fox Sports | Pts: Newbill 21; Rebs: Christmas, Newbill 8 Asts: Abercrombie 5 | boxscore | Pts: Boone 33; Rebs: Boone 15; Asts: Ware 6 | Attendance: not available Referees: Vaughan Mayberry, Michael Aylen, Damien Lyons |

(2) Adelaide 36ers vs. (3) Perth Wildcats

| 3 March 2018 | Adelaide 36ers | 109–74 (Series: Adelaide leads series, 1–0) | Perth Wildcats | Titanium Security Arena, Adelaide |
| 19:00 CDT | Scoring by quarter: 19–18, 31–26, 26–18, 33–12 |
| Fox Sports | Pts: Childress 22; Rebs: Creek 11; Asts: Shorter 7 | boxscore | Pts: Cotton 22; Rebs: Brandt, Cooke 6 Asts: Kenny 4 | Attendance: 6,000; Referees: Vaughan Mayberry, James Boyer, Chris Reid |

| 9 March 2018 | Perth Wildcats | 88–89 (Series: Adelaide wins series, 2–0) | Adelaide 36ers | Perth Arena, Perth |
| 18:30 WST | Scoring by quarter: 28–15, 21–25, 18–23, 21–26 |
| Fox Sports | Pts: Cotton 31; Rebs: Brandt 9 Asts: Tokoto 5 | boxscore | Pts: Childress 25; Rebs: Childress 10; Asts: Sobey 5 | Attendance: 12,055; Referees: Vaughan Mayberry, Chris Reid, Michael Aylen |

=== Grand Final ===
(1) Melbourne United vs. (2) Adelaide 36ers

| 16 March 2018 | Melbourne United | 107–96 (Series: Melbourne leads series, 1–0) | Adelaide 36ers | Hisense Arena, Melbourne |
| 19:30 EDT | Scoring by quarter: 29–28, 24–19, 26–24, 28–25 |
| Fox Sports | Pts: Goulding 26; Rebs: Boone, Wesley 7 Asts: Wesley 6 | boxscore | Pts: Johnson 18; Rebs: Creek 9 Asts: Creek, Moore 4 | Attendance: 8,699; Referees: Vaughan Mayberry, Chris Reid, Michael Aylen |

| 18 March 2018 | Adelaide 36ers | 110–95 (Series: Series tied, 1–1) | Melbourne United | Titanium Security Arena, Adelaide |
| 14:30 CDT | Scoring by quarter: 27–19, 30–22, 25–23, 28–31 |
| Fox Sports | Pts: Deng 18; Rebs: Creek 9 Asts: Moore, Sobey 5 | boxscore | Pts: Prather 20; Rebs: Prather 7 Asts: Goulding 3 | Attendance: 7,000; Referees: Vaughan Mayberry, Michael Aylen, Matt Townsend |

| 23 March 2018 | Melbourne United | 101–98 (Series: Melbourne leads series, 2–1) | Adelaide 36ers | Hisense Arena, Melbourne |
| 19:30 EDT | Scoring by quarter: 33–22, 20–31, 28–22, 20–23 |
| Fox Sports | Pts: Ware 25; Rebs: Prather 6 Asts: Ware 3 | boxscore | Pts: Johnson 20; Rebs: Creek 8 Asts: Creek 5 | Attendance: 9,362; Referees: Michael Aylen, Vaughan Mayberry, Chris Reid |

| 25 March 2018 | Adelaide 36ers | 90–81 (Series: Series tied, 2–2) | Melbourne United | Titanium Security Arena, Adelaide |
| 14:30 CDT | Scoring by quarter: 29–21, 26–10, 16–27, 19–23 |
| Fox Sports | Pts: Johnson 21; Rebs: Johnson 9 Asts: Shorter 3 | boxscore | Pts: Prather 23; Rebs: Prather 7 Asts: Goulding 4 | Attendance: 7,500; Referees: Vaughan Mayberry, Michael Aylen, Chris Reid |

| 31 March 2018 | Melbourne United | 100–82 (Series: Melbourne wins series, 3–2) | Adelaide 36ers | Hisense Arena, Melbourne |
| 18:00 EDT | Scoring by quarter: 34–22, 23–22, 21–25, 22–13 |
| Fox Sports | Pts: Goulding, Ware 23; Rebs: Boone 12; Asts: Wesley 3 | boxscore | Pts: Shorter 20; Rebs: Creek 10; Asts: Moore 7 | Attendance: 10,300; Referees: Michael Aylen, Vaughan Mayberry, Chris Reid |

== Awards ==
=== Pre-season ===
- Most Valuable Player (Ray Borner Medal): Travis Trice (Brisbane Bullets)

=== Season ===
- Most Valuable Player (Andrew Gaze Trophy): Bryce Cotton (Perth Wildcats)
- Rookie of the Year: Isaac Humphries (Sydney Kings)
- Best Defensive Player: Damian Martin (Perth Wildcats)
- Best Sixth Man: Ramone Moore (Adelaide 36ers)
- Most Improved Player: Shea Ili (New Zealand Breakers)
- Fans MVP: Mitch Creek (Adelaide 36ers)
- Coach of the Year (Lindsay Gaze Trophy): Dean Vickerman (Melbourne United)
- Referee of the Year: Michael Aylen
- All-NBL First Team:
  - Casper Ware (Melbourne United)
  - Bryce Cotton (Perth Wildcats)
  - Demitrius Conger (Illawarra Hawks)
  - Daniel Johnson (Adelaide 36ers)
  - Josh Boone (Melbourne United)
- All-NBL Second Team:
  - Jerome Randle (Sydney Kings)
  - Édgar Sosa (New Zealand Breakers)
  - JP Tokoto (Perth Wildcats)
  - Mitch Creek (Adelaide 36ers)
  - Tai Wesley (Melbourne United)

=== Finals ===
- Grand Final Series MVP (Larry Sengstock Medal): Chris Goulding (Melbourne United)
