= North Side High School (Jackson, Tennessee) =

Location
- 3066 North Highland Avenue; Jackson, Tennessee; United States; 35.692°N 88.828°W

Information
- Type: Public
- Established: 1943
- School district: Jackson-Madison County School System
- Superintendent: Dr. Marlon King
- Principal: Dr. Bryan Chandler
- Staff: 56.50 (FTE)
- Grades: 9–12
- Student to teacher ratio: 15.68
- Schedule: Block
- Campus: Urban
- Colors: Blue and Gold
- Athletics conference: Football – 4A Region 6 Other sports – AA Region 6 District 14
- Mascot: Indian
- Nickname: The Reservation; The North; The Tribe
- Website: https://northside.jmcss.org/

North Side High School is one of the five public high schools in the city of Jackson, Tennessee and a part of the Jackson-Madison County School System. Within the state, the school is commonly known as Jackson North Side.

== History ==
In 1943, what is now called the South Building was completed and North Side was formed with the consolidation of Huntersville, Pope, Fairview, Browns Church, and Spring Creek schools. In 1972, the football stadium was completed. East High consolidated with North Side in 1970, and Beech Bluff in 1977. In 1992, Jackson City and Madison County school systems were combined. In that year, the Tech Prep Center (middle building) was completed, and the following year the Fine Arts Building was completed.

List of individuals having served as Principal of North Side High School:

1944–1950: C. J. Huckaba

1950–1962: M. G. Anderson

1962–1986: Thurman Reynolds

1986–1992: O'Neal Henley

1992–1995: Clarence Boone

1995–1996: Dr.Dan Shaw Jr.

1996–2004: Lora Murchison (First female high school principal in Jackson-Madison County)

2004–2007: Mike Martin

2007–2008: Buddy White

2008–2012: Jan Watson

2012–2014: Ricky Catlett

2014–2022: Jason Bridgeman

2022– : Dr. Bryan Chandler

== School mascot ==
The school mascot is the Indian. The school colors are blue and gold. The stadium is also known as "The Reservation", it is dedicated and named after long-time North Side coach, T.D. Reynolds.

== Notable alumni ==
- Casey Prather (2010), basketball player
