= Chris Goulding =

Australian basketball player (born 1988)

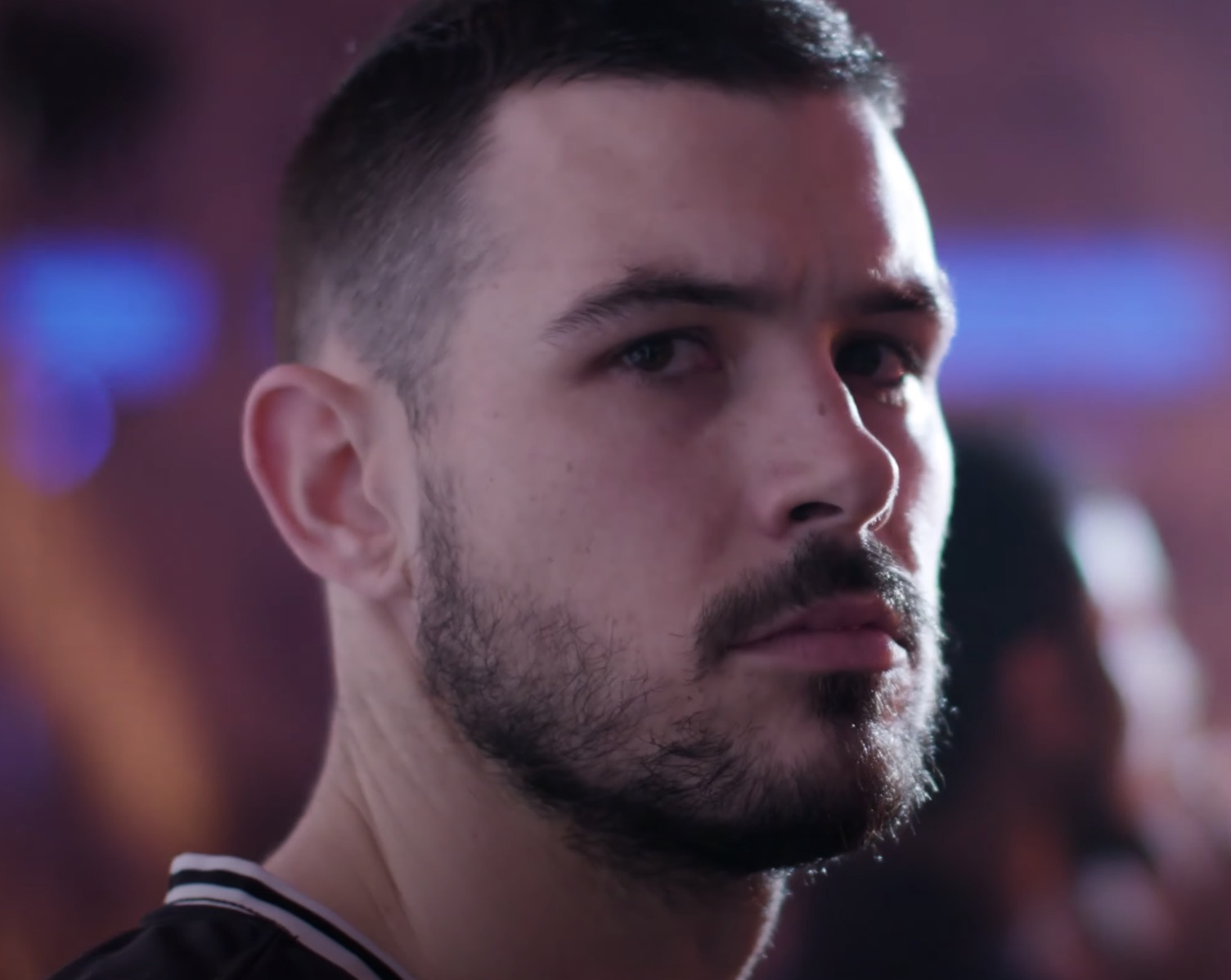
- Goulding in 2020

No. 43 – Melbourne United
- Position: Shooting guard
- League: NBL

Personal information
- Born: 24 October 1988 (age 38) Launceston, Tasmania, Australia
- Listed height: 192 cm (6 ft 4 in)
- Listed weight: 92 kg (203 lb)

Career information
- High school: Brisbane State (Brisbane, Queensland)
- Playing career: 2006–present

Career history
- 2006–2009: Southern Districts / Brisbane Spartans
- 2006–2008: Brisbane Bullets
- 2008–2009: Perth Wildcats
- 2009–2012: Gold Coast Blaze
- 2010–2012: Northside Wizards
- 2012–2014: Melbourne Tigers
- 2013: Gladstone Port City Power
- 2014–2015: CAI Zaragoza
- 2015–present: Melbourne United
- 2016: Auxilium Torino
- 2023: Paris Basketball
- 2025: Cangrejeros de Santurce

Career highlights
- 3× NBL champion (2007, 2018, 2021); NBL Grand Final MVP (2018); 3× All-NBL First Team (2014, 2016, 2024); 4× All-NBL Second Team (2021–2023, 2025); NBL scoring champion (2014); NBL All-Star Game MVP (2012); QBL champion (2006); QBL All-League Team (2010); 2× SEABL East YPOY (2008, 2009); All-SEABL Team (2009)
- Stats at Basketball Reference
Medals
Men's basketball
Representing Australia
Olympic Games
Bronze medal – third place	2020 Tokyo	Team
Commonwealth Games
Gold medal – first place	2018 Gold Coast	Team competition
FIBA Oceania Championship
Gold medal – first place	2015 Australia/New Zealand	National team

Christopher James Goulding (born 24 October 1988) is an Australian professional basketball player for Melbourne United of the National Basketball League (NBL). He made his debut in the NBL in 2006 as a development player with the Brisbane Bullets, going on to play for the Perth Wildcats and Gold Coast Blaze, before settling in Melbourne. In the NBL, Goulding is a three-time championship winner and a three-time All-NBL First Team honouree. He also won the league's scoring title in 2014 and claimed grand final MVP honours in 2018. Goulding is a regular with the Australian Boomers, but he also holds a British passport.

== Early life ==
Goulding was born in Launceston, Tasmania. He attended West Launceston Primary School and spent a lot of time around Australian rules football thanks to his father Steve who played professionally for North Melbourne and Claremont. He first started playing basketball recreationally while in Launceston, and upon moving to Queensland with his family as an 8-year-old, he began to play it competitively. In Brisbane, he continued primary school at Gumdale State School and then attended secondary school at Brisbane State High School. He graduated from Brisbane State High in 2005. As a junior, he played for the Southern Districts Spartans.

== Professional career ==
=== NBL, Europe and Puerto Rico ===
Goulding began his professional career as a development player with the Brisbane Bullets during the 2006–07 NBL season. He made his NBL debut and lone appearance of the season on 23 December 2006 against the Townsville Crocodiles, recording one assist in 5½ minutes. The Bullets went on to win the NBL championship in March 2007, earning Goulding his first title. He appeared in 15 games for the Bullets during the 2007–08 NBL season, but following the club's collapse, he moved west for the 2008–09 NBL season to play for the Perth Wildcats.

For the 2009–10 NBL season, Goulding returned to Queensland to play for the Gold Coast Blaze. He spent three seasons with the Blaze before they too collapsed following the 2011–12 season.

For the 2012–13 NBL season, Goulding joined the Melbourne Tigers. In December 2012, he was named MVP of the NBL All-Star Game for his 24 points.

After a stint with the Cleveland Cavaliers during the 2013 NBA Summer League, Goulding continued on with the Tigers for the 2013–14 NBL season. On 9 March 2014, he scored a career-high 50 points and made nine 3-pointers in the Tigers' 92–82 win over the Sydney Kings. It was the NBL's first individual 50-point game in the 40-minute era. He was subsequently crowned the NBL scoring champion for the 2013–14 season with a league-best 23.0 points per game.

After a stint with the Dallas Mavericks during the 2014 NBA Summer League, Goulding moved to Spain for the 2014–15 season to play for CAI Zaragoza. He averaged 8.6 points per game in 33 Liga ACB games, and 11.5 points per game in 16 EuroCup games.

Goulding returned to Australia for the 2015–16 season and re-joined the Melbourne franchise, now known as Melbourne United. He helped United win the minor premiership after they finished the regular season in first place with an 18–10 record. However, they were defeated in the semi-finals by the New Zealand Breakers. Following the conclusion of the NBL season, Goulding moved to Italy to play out the season with Auxilium Torino. He averaged 4.2 points per game in 10 LBA games.

Goulding returned to United for the 2016–17 NBL season, but he played 22 of a possible 28 games after separate left ankle sprains. United missed the finals in 2016–17 with a sixth-place finish and a 13–15 record, and following the season, he opted for surgery on his left ankle, which sidelined him for eight to ten weeks.

The 2017–18 NBL season saw Goulding lead United back to the top of the table with a first-place finish and a 20–8 record. They went on to reach the NBL Grand Final series, where they defeated the Adelaide 36ers 3–2 in the best-of-five series. Goulding claimed his second NBL championship while winning the Grand Final MVP.

Returning to United once again for the 2018–19 season, Goulding helped lead United back to the NBL Grand Final series, where they lost 3–1 to the Perth Wildcats.

In December 2019, Goulding played his 300th NBL game.

On 17 July 2020, Goulding re-signed with United on a three-year deal. He was ruled out for the majority of February 2021 with a low grade calf strain. In June 2021, he played his 350th NBL game.

In January 2022, Goulding reached 5000 NBL points, becoming just the second active player to reach the milestone behind Daniel Johnson of the Adelaide 36ers.

On 25 August 2022, Goulding signed a two-year contract extension with United. In the 2022–23 season, he reached 1000 career 3-pointers and 400 NBL games. Following the NBL season, he joined Paris Basketball of the LNB Pro A.

In the 2023–24 NBL season, Goulding was named United Club MVP for the second straight year. He made 140 three-pointers, more than anyone else in the 40-minute era and the fourth most in league history. He was also named to the All-NBL First Team. United finished as minor premiers and reached the NBL Grand Final series, where they lost 3–2 to the Tasmania JackJumpers.

On 10 April 2024, Goulding extended his contract with United until the end of the 2026–27 season. In October 2024, he became just the 30th player in league history to reach 450 career games. On 9 November 2024, he scored 46 points and made nine 3-pointers, which included a 25-point third quarter, in a 106–97 win over the Perth Wildcats. On 3 December, he was ruled out for two weeks with a calf injury. He missed four games, with United losing three straight. On 13 January 2025, he scored 42 points and made 10 3-pointers, including the game winner, in a 91–89 win over the New Zealand Breakers. In game one of United's semi-finals series, he scored 41 points and made 10 3-pointers in a 105–93 win over the Wildcats, becoming the third player to have 10 3-pointers in an NBL final behind Bryce Cotton and John Rillie. He helped United reach the grand final series with a 113–112 win over Perth in game three behind his 30 points and nine 3-pointers. United went on to lose the grand final series 3–2 to the Illawarra Hawks despite Goulding's team-high 21 points in a 114–104 game five loss.

In April 2025, Goulding joined Cangrejeros de Santurce of the Baloncesto Superior Nacional.

Goulding returned as United captain for the 2025–26 season but missed the first four games with a low grade quad injury. On 17 October 2025, in a 95–86 win over the Brisbane Bullets, Goulding moved past John Rillie for third all-time in NBL 3-pointers made and became the first player to ever made a 3-pointer in 100 consecutive NBL games. In January 2026, he became just the 15th player in league history to reach 500 career games.

Goulding returned as United captain for the 2026–27 season. On 30 September, he was ruled out for several weeks after injuring his calf in round 2. He returned in late October after missing seven games.

=== SEABL and QBL ===
Between 2006 and 2009, Goulding played with the Southern Districts Spartans in the QBL (2006) and SEABL (2007–09). In 2006, he was a member of the Spartans' championship-winning team. As a member of the Spartans for three seasons in the SEABL, Goulding won East Youth Player of the Year two consecutive seasons in 2008 and 2009 while also making the All-Star Five in his last year. In 2008, he averaged 24.5 points per game to finish second in the competition and had a season-high 43 points during the season. In 2009, averaged 20.8 points to finish fifth, second in free throw percentage (83%), ninth in three-point percentage (39%) and seventh in assists (three). Between 2010 and 2012, he played three seasons for the Northside Wizards in the QBL, earning All-League Team honours in 2010. In 2013, he had a three-game stint with the QBL's Gladstone Port City Power.

== National team career ==
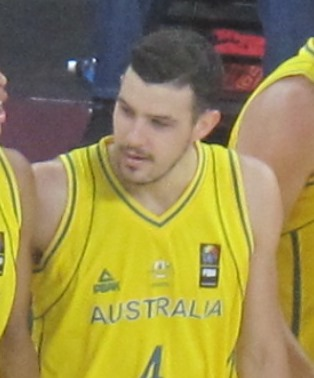
Goulding with the Australian Boomers in 2014

As a youth, Goulding represented Australia in under-18s, under-19s and under-20s, including playing at the 2007 FIBA Under-19 World Championship in Serbia. In 2014, he played for the Australian Boomers at the FIBA World Cup in Spain. He went on to play for the Boomers at the 2015 FIBA Oceania Championship and the 2016 Rio Olympics. In 2018, he won a gold medal with the Boomers at the Commonwealth Games, and in 2019, he competed at the FIBA World Cup in China.

In February 2021, Goulding was named in the Boomers' Olympic squad. He helped Australia win the bronze medal.

In November 2024, Goulding joined the Boomers for the 2025 FIBA Asia Cup qualifiers.

== Personal life ==
Goulding is the son of Steve and Christine. His father played and coached at North Launceston Football Club, and was inducted into the AFL Tasmania Hall of Fame in 2008. Due to his father being English, Goulding holds a British passport.

Goulding is married to wife Molly. The couple have two children as of 2024.
