= Casey Prather =

American basketball player (born 1991)

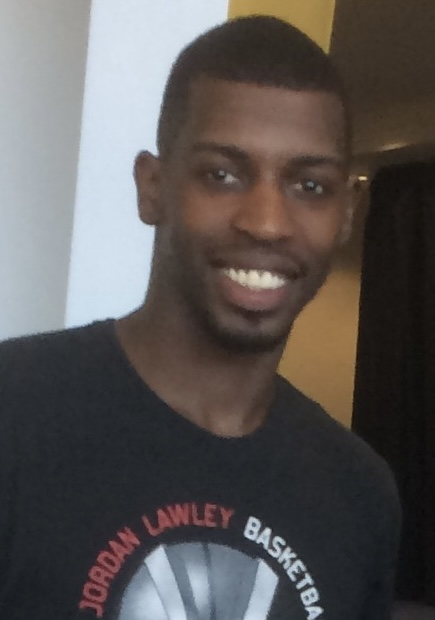
- Prather in 2017

Free agent
- Position: Shooting guard / small forward

Personal information
- Born: May 29, 1991 (age 35) Jackson, Tennessee, U.S.
- Listed height: 6 ft 5 in (196 cm)
- Listed weight: 207 lb (94 kg)

Career information
- High school: North Side (Jackson, Tennessee)
- College: Florida (2010–2014)
- NBA draft: 2014: undrafted
- Playing career: 2014–present

Career history
- 2014–2015: Bakersfield Jam
- 2015–2017: Perth Wildcats
- 2017: ratiopharm Ulm
- 2017–2018: Melbourne United
- 2018: Promitheas Patras
- 2019–2020: Melbourne United
- 2020–2023: Hapoel Eilat
- 2023–2026: Brisbane Bullets
- 2025: Shanxi Loongs

Career highlights
- Israeli League MVP (2021); All-Israeli League Team (2021); 3× NBL champion (2016–2018); All-NBL First Team (2017); All-NBL Second Team (2025); First-team All-SEC (2014)
- Stats at Basketball Reference

Casey Lamar Prather (born May 29, 1991) is an American professional basketball player who last played for the Brisbane Bullets of the National Basketball League (NBL). He played college basketball for the Florida Gators before playing professionally in the NBA Development League, Australia, Germany, Greece and Israel. He won three straight NBL championships between 2016 and 2018, the first two with the Perth Wildcats and the third with Melbourne United. He joined Hapoel Eilat in 2020 and was named as the Israeli League MVP in 2021, but missed the 2021–22 and 2022–23 seasons with knee injuries.

== Early life ==
Prather was born and raised in Jackson, Tennessee, under the stern watch of his mother Enova and sister Brittany, with his parents having split before he was born. Growing up, family and basketball kept him away from the growing criminal element in his community. At the age of 12, his stepfather, Jeffery, noticed Prather's athleticism and began teaching him the skills required to pursue playing professionally.

== High school career ==
Prather attended Jackson's North Side High School, where he averaged 28 points per game as a sophomore, and 24.4 points and 14 rebounds as a junior. During his junior season, he had a 53-point, 24-rebound performance in a district game against Fayette Ware High School. Following his junior year, he was ranked the 25th-best prospect by Scout.com, and the 10th-best small forward. On November 17, 2009, he signed a National Letter of Intent to play college basketball for the University of Florida.

As a senior in 2009–10, Prather was a finalist for Tennessee's Mr. Basketball after averaging 29 points, 13 rebounds, five blocks, five steals and three assists per game. He finished his four-year career at North Side with over 2,000 points. He was selected to the All-District team and was named team MVP all four seasons at North Side, and was selected to the district's All-Tournament team his sophomore, junior and senior seasons. He was also named All-West Player of the Year in 2008–09 and 2009–10.

During his time at North Side, Prather was member of the Nashville Celtics AAU team that captured the 2010 River City Showdown Championship.

== College career ==
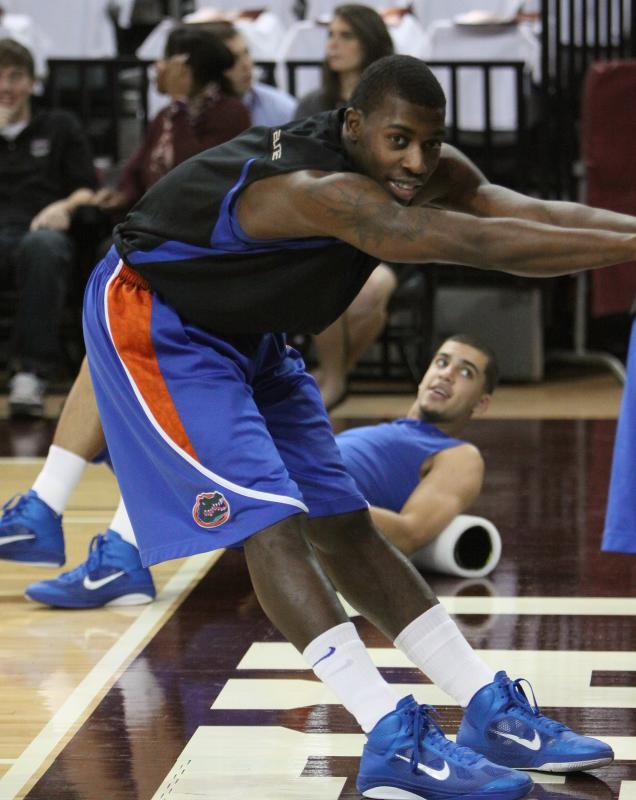
Prather with the Gators in January 2011

Prather played four seasons of college basketball for Billy Donovan's Florida Gators. Over his first three college seasons, Prather was a key role player off the bench. As a junior in 2012–13, Prather played in 29 games with two starting assignments, and averaged a career-best 6.2 points per game. He led the Southeastern Conference (SEC) with a .642 two-point field goal percentage. He twice scored a season-high 12 points, and had an 11-point game in Florida's Sweet 16 win over Florida Gulf Coast.

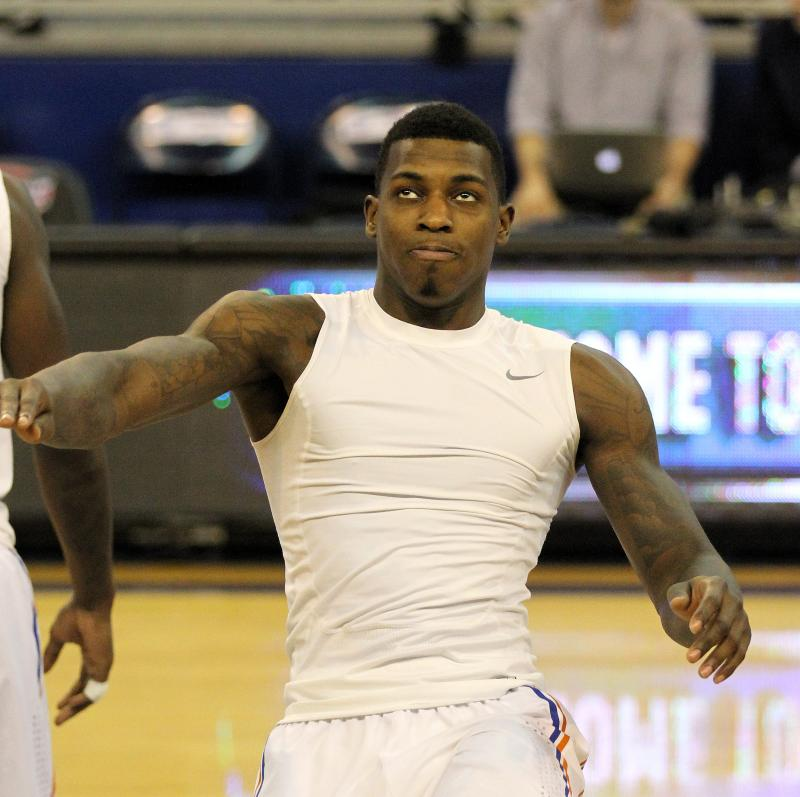
Prather with the Gators in February 2014

As a senior year in 2013–14, Prather stepped up to become a key scorer for the Gators, more than doubling his scoring average from his junior year. He led the Gators in scoring and was named first-team All-SEC. He became the third Gator under Billy Donovan to record three 27-point games in a single season, joining Nick Calathes (2008–09) and Teddy Dupay (2000–01). He totaled six 20-point games, including his career-best 28 points in Florida's season opener against North Florida. This increase in production was a key factor for Florida becoming one of the top teams of the 2013–14 season. For the fourth straight year, the Gators reached the Regional Finals, where they defeated Dayton to move on to the Final Four. In the national semifinals, the Gators were defeated by Connecticut to fall short of reaching the championship game, despite a 15-point effort from Prather. In 37 games (35 starts) for the Gators in 2013–14, he averaged 13.8 points, 5.0 rebounds, 1.6 assists and 1.0 steals per game. He led the SEC, and was seventh in the NCAA, with a .603 field goal percentage, and led the SEC in two-point field goal percentage for the second season in a row, at .607.

== Professional career ==
=== Summer League and D-League (2014–2015) ===
After going undrafted in the 2014 NBA draft, Prather played for the Atlanta Hawks in the NBA Summer League and spent preseason with the Phoenix Suns. He joined the Bakersfield Jam of the NBA Development League for the 2014–15 season. He helped the Jam win the inaugural NBA Development League Showcase Cup. On March 22, 2015, he scored a season-high 30 points in a 124–113 win over the Rio Grande Valley Vipers. In 49 games, he averaged 12.0 points, 3.7 rebounds, 1.8 assists and 1.3 steals per game.

Prather played for the NBA D-League Select Team in the 2015 NBA Summer League.

=== Perth Wildcats (2015–2017) ===
==== 2015–16 season ====
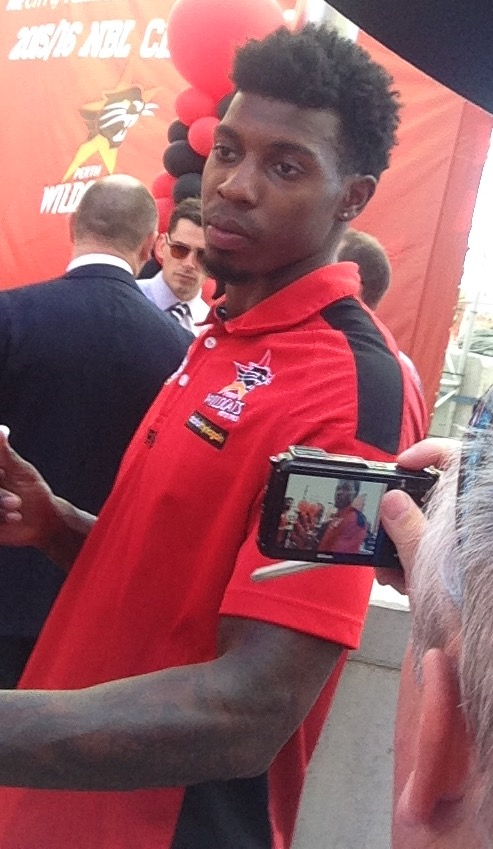
Prather in March 2016, at the Wildcats' championship ceremony

On July 25, 2015, Prather signed with the Perth Wildcats for the 2015–16 NBL season. He was lured to Australia by former college teammate Scottie Wilbekin. On November 22, he scored 26 points and made the winning free throw with 1.5 seconds left in the match to lift the Wildcats to a 91–90 win over the Cairns Taipans. On January 15, 2016, he scored a season-high 27 points in a 95–68 win over the Sydney Kings, helping the Wildcats snap a three-game losing streak. He helped the Wildcats reach the NBL Grand Final series, where they defeated the New Zealand Breakers 2–1 to win the championship, with Prather scoring a team-high 19 points in game three. In 27 games, he averaged 16.3 points, 4.5 rebounds, 1.8 assists and 1.2 steals per game. He was subsequently named the Wildcats' Club MVP.

==== 2016–17 season ====
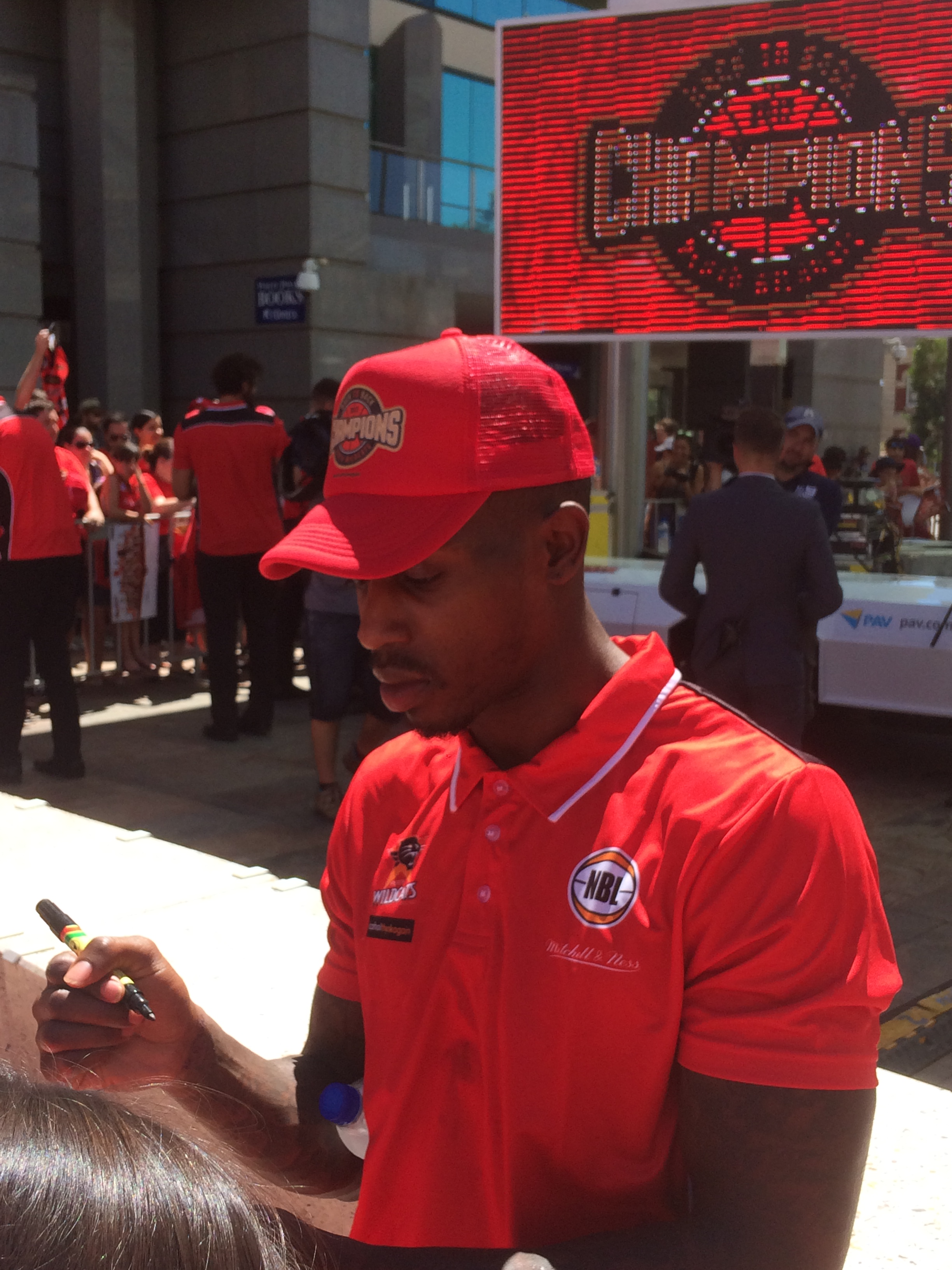
Prather in March 2017, at the Wildcats' championship ceremony

Following the 2015–16 season, Prather pledged to return to Perth for the 2016–17 NBL season. After a stint with the Dallas Mavericks in the 2016 NBA Summer League, he re-signed with the Wildcats in July 2016.

In the Wildcats' third game of the season on October 14, Prather scored 29 points in a 75–73 win over the New Zealand Breakers. On December 9, he scored a career-high 39 points in a 92–89 win over Melbourne United. On February 10, 2017, he scored 29 points in a 101–74 win over the Sydney Kings. Two days later, he recorded 26 points and a career-high 11 assists in a 96–94 win over United. In the Wildcats' semifinal series against the Cairns Taipans, Prather scored 22 points in game one and a game-high 24 points in game two to lead the Wildcats to a 2–0 sweep. In the NBL Grand Final series, Prather scored a game-high 22 points in game one; 18 points in game two; and 17 points in game three, as the Wildcats won their second straight championship with a 3–0 series sweep of the Illawarra Hawks.

Prather was named in the All-NBL First Team and finished second in NBL MVP voting (107 votes) behind Jerome Randle (147) of the Adelaide 36ers. He was also named the club's most valuable player for the 2016–17 season to become the first-ever Wildcat to be the club's best in both seasons of a back-to-back championship era, and became the only player to be club MVP in more than one championship season. He also became the eighth Wildcat to win multiple club MVPs, the first player in history to take out the award in his first two years in the NBL, and just the second player to win club MVPs in his first two seasons with the club (the other being James Crawford in 1987 and 1988). In 31 games, he averaged 19.5 points, 4.6 rebounds, 3.5 assists and 1.6 steals per game.

=== ratiopharm Ulm (2017) ===
In April 2017, Prather joined ratiopharm Ulm of the German Basketball Bundesliga for the rest of the 2016–17 season. He helped the team reach the BBL semifinals. In 13 games, he averaged 8.5 points, 2.5 rebounds and 1.2 assists per game.

=== Melbourne United (2017–2018) ===
The 2017 off-season saw Prather play for the Cleveland Cavaliers in the NBA Summer League. Believing he was on the verge of joining the Cavaliers for the season, Prather rejected an offer to return to the Perth Wildcats. After failing to secure an NBA contract, Prather briefly turned his attention to Europe, before instead deciding to return to Australia. With Perth's roster full, Prather signed with Melbourne United for the 2017–18 NBL season on August 16.

Prather debuted for Melbourne in their season opener on October 5, 2017, scoring 20 points in a 99–97 win over the Adelaide 36ers. On October 28, he scored 30 points in an 87–85 loss to the Brisbane Bullets. On December 16, he suffered a dislocated elbow in the second quarter of Melbourne's 84–78 win over the Illawarra Hawks. He subsequently missed the next eight weeks. He helped United win the minor premiership and reach the NBL Grand Final. In game two of the grand final series against the Adelaide 36ers, Prather had a game-high 20 points in a 110–95 loss. He scored 23 points in both games three and four. In game five, he recorded 19 points, 11 rebounds and five steals in a 100–82 win to help Melbourne clinch the championship with a 3–2 series victory. With the win, Prather collected his third NBL championship to become the first player in NBL history to win three straight titles in his first three seasons in the league. In 23 games for United in 2017–18, he averaged 16.7 points, 6.0 rebounds, 2.2 assists and 1.4 steals per game.

=== Promitheas Patras and BC Khimki (2018) ===
On April 13, 2018, Prather signed with Promitheas Patras of the Greek Basket League. He appeared in the team's final four games of the regular season and then in all eight of their playoff games, which included losing both the semifinals and the third-place series. In 12 games, he averaged 11.8 points, 2.3 rebounds, 1.2 assists and 1.0 steals per game.

On July 24, 2018, Prather signed with Russian team BC Khimki on a 1+1 contract. However, a clean-out of his knee resulted in his departure from Russia, as he was replaced on the roster by Garlon Green in November and was unable to make his debut for Khimki.

=== Return to Melbourne (2019–2020) ===
On July 17, 2019, Prather signed a two-year deal with Melbourne United, returning to the team for a second stint. However, due to another knee clean-out, he missed the first seven games of the 2019–20 season. He played in six of the next eight games before a right hamstring tear saw him miss the rest of the season from December 15 onwards. Melbourne went to lose to the Sydney Kings in the semifinals.

On August 20, 2020, Prather parted ways with United after mutually agreeing to terminate the second season of his contract.

=== Hapoel Eilat (2020–2023) ===
On August 23, 2020, Prather signed with Hapoel Eilat of the Israeli Basketball Premier League. He averaged 22.5 points (second in the league), 6.0 rebounds and 1.5 steals during the regular season. He had a 41-point game during the regular season and finished with a new club record of 631 points in total. He was subsequently named Israeli League MVP for the 2020–21 season. He was also named to the All-Israeli League Team. He helped Hapoel Eilat reach the semifinals, but sustained a knee injury during the dying seconds of the elimination match. He averaged 22.8 points and 5.8 rebounds in the playoffs.

On October 6, 2021, Prather re-signed with Hapoel Eilat until 2023. However, he missed both the 2021–22 and 2022–23 seasons due to back-to-back season-ending knee injuries, including a patella tendon injury and a fractured kneecap.

=== Brisbane Bullets and Shanxi Loongs (2023–2026) ===
On December 21, 2023, Prather signed a two-year deal with the Brisbane Bullets, returning to the Australian NBL for a fourth stint. He joined the team as an injury replacement for D. J. Mitchell. On January 7, 2024, in his first game since June 2021, Prather scored eight points in 11 minutes in a 101–93 win over the Sydney Kings. He averaged 6.7 points in seven games to finish the 2023–24 season.

On April 10, 2024, Prather's contract for the 2024–25 NBL season was exercised by the Bullets. On December 20, 2024, he scored a game-high 35 points with six 3-pointers in a 107–104 win over the Cairns Taipans. On December 24, he scored a game-high 36 points with seven 3-pointers in a 111–90 win over the Adelaide 36ers. From round 10 onwards, he averaged over 25 points per game with 44 per cent shooting from 3-point range and seven rebounds per game. He finished as the third leading scorer in the competition with 21.3 points per game. He was subsequently named the Bullets Club MVP and earned All-NBL Second Team honors.

On February 7, 2025, Prather re-signed with the Bullets for the 2025–26 NBL season.

On March 11, 2025, Prather signed with the Shanxi Loongs of the Chinese Basketball Association (CBA) for the rest of the 2024–25 season, replacing Godwin Omenaka. In six CBA games, he averaged 9.3 points, 3.5 rebounds, 1.2 assists and 1.0 steals per game.

On September 19, 2025, Prather scored a game-high 27 points in the Bullets' season-opening 104–95 win over the New Zealand Breakers. On October 15, he recorded 34 points and 10 rebounds in a 110–93 win over the Perth Wildcats. On November 12, he scored a game-high 26 points in a 113–84 loss to the Breakers, but injured his knee going up for a layup early in the fourth quarter. He was subsequently ruled out for the rest of the season after undergoing surgery to correct a hardware-related fixation issue. His season ended with him averaging a career-high 24.4 points per game.

In July 2026, the Bullets parted ways with Prather. He subsequently moved to Japan to take part in Nagasaki Velca's pre-season campaign under his former United coach, Dean Vickerman.

== Personal life ==
In May 2024, Prather and his wife Ariana had their first child in Australia. His wife is a professional broadcaster and reporter, having worked in the NBA and NBL.
