= Shannon Shorter =

American basketball player (born 1989)

No. 7 – Bashkimi
- Position: Shooting guard / point guard
- League: Kosovo Basketball Superleague

Personal information
- Born: August 1, 1989 (age 37) Houston, Texas, U.S.
- Listed height: 6 ft 4 in (1.93 m)
- Listed weight: 212 lb (96 kg)

Career information
- High school: Westside (Houston, Texas)
- College: Texas A&M–CC (2007–2008); Paris JC (2008–2009); North Texas (2009–2011)
- NBA draft: 2011: undrafted
- Playing career: 2012–present

Career history
- 2012: Houston Blaze
- 2012: Guerreros de Guerrero Cumple
- 2012: Gansos Salvajes de la UIC
- 2013: Club La Unión
- 2013–2014: Ostioneros de Guaymas
- 2013–2014: Hapoel Kfar Saba
- 2014–2015: Hapoel Afula
- 2015–2016: Hiroshima Dragonflies
- 2016–2017: Hebei Xianglan
- 2016–2017: TED Ankara Kolejliler
- 2017: Le Mans Sarthe
- 2017–2018: Adelaide 36ers
- 2018: Al Riyadi
- 2018–2019: Ulsan Mobis Phoebus
- 2019: Incheon ET Land Elephants
- 2019–2020: PAOK
- 2020–2021: Chiba Jets
- 2021: Afyon Belediye
- 2021–2025: Split
- 2023: Shijiazhuang Xianglan
- 2023: Al Ittihad Alexandria
- 2025: Fuerza Regia de Monterrey
- 2025–present: Bashkimi

Career highlights
- KBL champion (2019); Croatian Cup winner (2025); Israeli National League All-Star (2014); Israeli National League All-Star Game MVP (2014); ABA League Top Scorer (2022)

Shannon Jerod Shorter (born August 1, 1989) is an American professional basketball player for Bashkimi of the Kosovo Basketball Superleague. He played college basketball at Texas A&M Corpus Christi, Paris Junior College, and North Texas.

== College career ==
Shorter played four years of college basketball between 2007 and 2011. After spending his freshman season with Texas A&M–Corpus Christi, Shorter joined Paris Junior College for his sophomore year. He returned to a Division 1 school in 2009, joining North Texas. In 66 games for North Texas over two seasons, he averaged 6.5 points, 3.8 rebounds and 1.9 assists per game.

== Professional career ==
Shorter, who went undrafted in 2011, spent time playing across Mexico, Argentina, Israel, Japan and China between 2012 and 2016.

On September 23, 2016, Shorter signed with TED Ankara Kolejliler of the Turkish Basketball Super League. In March 2017, he left Ankara and joined French team Le Mans Sarthe Basket for the rest of the season.

On May 12, 2017, Shorter signed with Chinese team Hebei Xianglan, returning to the team for a second stint.

On July 28, 2017, Shorter signed with the Adelaide 36ers for the 2017–18 NBL season.

On March 31, 2018, Shorter signed with Al Riyadi of the Lebanese Basketball League.

On July 4, 2020, Shorter signed with Chiba Jets Of the B.League.

On July 30, 2021, Shorter signed with Afyon Belediye of the Turkish Basketbol Süper Ligi (BSL). Shorther averaged 18.4 points, 5.4 rebounds, and 3.8 assists per game. On December 18, he signed with Split of the Adriatic League and the Croatian League. On July 28, 2022, he re-signed with Split.

On August 16, 2023, Shorter signed with Al Ittihad Alexandria of the Egyptian Basketball Premier League. On November 3, he signed with Split. On July 23, 2024, he re-signed with Split.
