= 2018–19 NBL season =

Professional basketball season

- League: National Basketball League
- Season: 2018–19
- Dates: 11 October 2018 – 17 March 2019
- Teams: 8
- TV partners: Australia: Fox Sports Nine Network 9Go!; New Zealand: Sky Sport; Online: NBL TV

Regular season
- Season champions: Perth Wildcats
- Season MVP: (Australia) Andrew Bogut (Sydney)

Finals
- Champions: Perth Wildcats (9th title)
- Runners-up: Melbourne United
- Semifinalists: Sydney Kings; Brisbane Bullets
- Finals MVP: (United States) Terrico White (Perth)

Statistical leaders
| Points | (United States) Bryce Cotton (Perth) | 22.5 |
| Rebounds | (Australia) Andrew Bogut (Sydney) | 11.6 |
| Assists | (Australia) Nathan Sobey (Adelaide) | 5.2 |
| Efficiency | (South Sudan) Deng Deng (Sydney) | 67% |

Records
- Attendance: 793,782
- Average attendance: 6,615

NBL seasons
- ← 2017–18 2019–20 →
- All statistics correct as of 17 March 2019.

The 2018–19 NBL season was the 41st season of the National Basketball League since its establishment in 1979. A total of eight teams have contested the league. The regular season had been played between October 2018 and February 2019, followed by a post-season featuring the top four in March 2019.

Australian broadcast rights to the season are held by Fox Sports, in the fourth year of a five-year deal, with two game per week simulcast on the Nine Network. In New Zealand, Sky Sport are the official league broadcaster.

As Australia and New Zealand are participating in 2019 FIBA Basketball World Cup qualification, the league will take a break during the FIBA international windows of 26 November to 4 December 2018 and 18–26 February 2019.

The Perth Wildcats won their ninth NBL championship after defeating Melbourne United in the Grand Final.

== Pre-season ==
The pre-season featured games in China and Malaysia. As well, it featured the NBLxNBA 2018 Tour in which five NBL teams played a total of seven games. Five NBL teams played a total of seven games against NBA teams in the 2018 pre-season.

== Regular season ==
The regular season started on 11 October 2018 and finished on 17 February 2019. Eight teams participated, with the top four advancing to the finals series.

=== Ladder ===
| Pos | 2018–19 NBL season | | | | | | | | | | | |
| Pos | Team | Pld | W | L | PCT | Last 5 | Streak | Home | Away | PF | PA | PP |
|---|---|---|---|---|---|---|---|---|---|---|---|---|
| 1 | Perth Wildcats^{1} | 28 | 18 | 10 | 64.29% | 4–1 | L1 | 12–2 | 6–8 | 2499 | 2355 | 106.11% |
| 2 | Melbourne United^{1} | 28 | 18 | 10 | 64.29% | 3–2 | W1 | 10–4 | 8–6 | 2586 | 2478 | 104.36% |
| 3 | Sydney Kings^{1} | 28 | 18 | 10 | 64.29% | 4–1 | W1 | 9–5 | 9–5 | 2438 | 2380 | 102.44% |
| 4 | Brisbane Bullets^{2} | 28 | 14 | 14 | 50.00% | 2–3 | W1 | 9–5 | 5–9 | 2503 | 2480 | 100.93% |
| 5 | Adelaide 36ers^{2} | 28 | 14 | 14 | 50.00% | 2–3 | L2 | 6–8 | 8–6 | 2687 | 2681 | 100.22% |
| 6 | New Zealand Breakers^{3} | 28 | 12 | 16 | 42.86% | 2–3 | L1 | 7–7 | 5–9 | 2649 | 2641 | 100.30% |
| 7 | Illawarra Hawks^{3} | 28 | 12 | 16 | 42.86% | 1–4 | L3 | 8–6 | 4–10 | 2493 | 2664 | 93.58% |
| 8 | Cairns Taipans | 28 | 6 | 22 | 21.43% | 2–3 | L1 | 3–11 | 3–11 | 2400 | 2576 | 93.17% |

Updated to match(es) played on 17 February 2019. Source: NBL.com.au

The NBL tie-breaker system as outlined in the NBL Rules and Regulations states that in the case of an identical win–loss record, the overall points percentage between the teams will determine order of seeding.

^{1}Perth Wildcats won on overall points percentage. Melbourne United finished 2nd on overall points percentage.

^{2}Brisbane Bullets won on overall points percentage.

^{3}New Zealand Breakers won on overall points percentage.

=== Ladder progression ===
- Numbers highlighted in green indicate that the team finished the round inside the top four.
- Numbers highlighted in blue indicates the team finished first on the ladder in that round.
- Numbers highlighted in red indicates the team finished last place on the ladder in that round.

2018–19 NBL season
| Team | 1 | 2 | 3 | 4 | 5 | 6 | 7 | 8 | 9 | 10 | 11 | 12 | 13 | 14 | 15 | 16 | 17 | 18 |
|---|---|---|---|---|---|---|---|---|---|---|---|---|---|---|---|---|---|---|
| Adelaide 36ers | 3 | 4 | 4 | 6 | 7 | 5 | 5 | 6 | 5 | 5 | 5 | 5 | 5 | 5 | 5 | 4 | 4 | 5 |
| Brisbane Bullets | 5 | 6 | 6 | 3 | 5 | 6 | 4 | 4 | 4 | 4 | 4 | 4 | 4 | 4 | 4 | 5 | 5 | 4 |
| Cairns Taipans | 2 | 3 | 8 | 8 | 8 | 8 | 8 | 8 | 8 | 8 | 8 | 8 | 8 | 8 | 8 | 8 | 8 | 8 |
| Illawarra Hawks | 8 | 7 | 7 | 7 | 6 | 7 | 7 | 5 | 6 | 6 | 6 | 7 | 6 | 6 | 6 | 6 | 6 | 7 |
| Melbourne United | 4 | 2 | 2 | 2 | 2 | 2 | 2 | 2 | 3 | 1 | 3 | 3 | 2 | 2 | 1 | 1 | 2 | 2 |
| New Zealand Breakers | 6 | 8 | 5 | 5 | 4 | 4 | 6 | 7 | 7 | 7 | 7 | 6 | 7 | 7 | 7 | 7 | 7 | 6 |
| Perth Wildcats | 1 | 1 | 1 | 1 | 1 | 1 | 1 | 1 | 1 | 3 | 2 | 2 | 3 | 3 | 2 | 2 | 1 | 1 |
| Sydney Kings | 7 | 5 | 3 | 4 | 3 | 3 | 3 | 3 | 2 | 2 | 1 | 1 | 1 | 1 | 3 | 3 | 3 | 3 |

== Finals ==
The 2019 NBL Finals were played in February and March 2019, consisting of two best-of-three semi-final series and the best-of-five Grand Final series. In the semi-finals, the higher seed hosts the first and third games. In the Grand Final, the higher seed hosts the first, third and fifth games.

After winning both of their semi-finals in straight games, the Perth Wildcats and Melbourne United progressed to the Grand Final where the Wildcats triumphed 3–1.

=== Playoff bracket ===
Semifinals
1 | Perth Wildcats | 89 | 84 | X
4 | Brisbane Bullets | 59 | 79 | X
2 | Melbourne United | 95 | 90 | X
3 | Sydney Kings | 73 | 76 | X

Grand Final
1 | Perth Wildcats | 81 | 74 | 96 | 97 | X
2 | Melbourne United | 71 | 92 | 67 | 82 | X

== Awards ==
=== Pre-season ===
- Most Valuable Player (Ray Borner Medal): Bryce Cotton (Perth Wildcats)

=== Season ===
- Most Valuable Player (Andrew Gaze Trophy): Andrew Bogut (Sydney Kings)
- Rookie of the Year: Harry Froling (Adelaide 36ers)
- Best Defensive Player: Andrew Bogut (Sydney Kings)
- Best Sixth Man: Reuben Te Rangi (Brisbane Bullets)
- Most Improved Player: Reuben Te Rangi (Brisbane Bullets)
- Fans MVP: Bryce Cotton (Perth Wildcats)
- Coach of the Year (Lindsay Gaze Trophy): Dean Vickerman (Melbourne United)
- Referee of the Year: Michael Aylen
- All-NBL First Team:
  - Casper Ware (Melbourne United)
  - Bryce Cotton (Perth Wildcats)
  - Lamar Patterson (Brisbane Bullets)
  - Nick Kay (Perth Wildcats)
  - Andrew Bogut (Sydney Kings)
- All-NBL Second Team:
  - Jerome Randle (Sydney Kings)
  - Melo Trimble (Cairns Taipans)
  - Nathan Sobey (Adelaide 36ers)
  - Daniel Johnson (Adelaide 36ers)
  - Shawn Long (New Zealand Breakers)

=== Finals ===
- Grand Final Series MVP (Larry Sengstock Medal): Terrico White (Perth Wildcats)
