= Casper Ware =

American basketball player (born 1990)

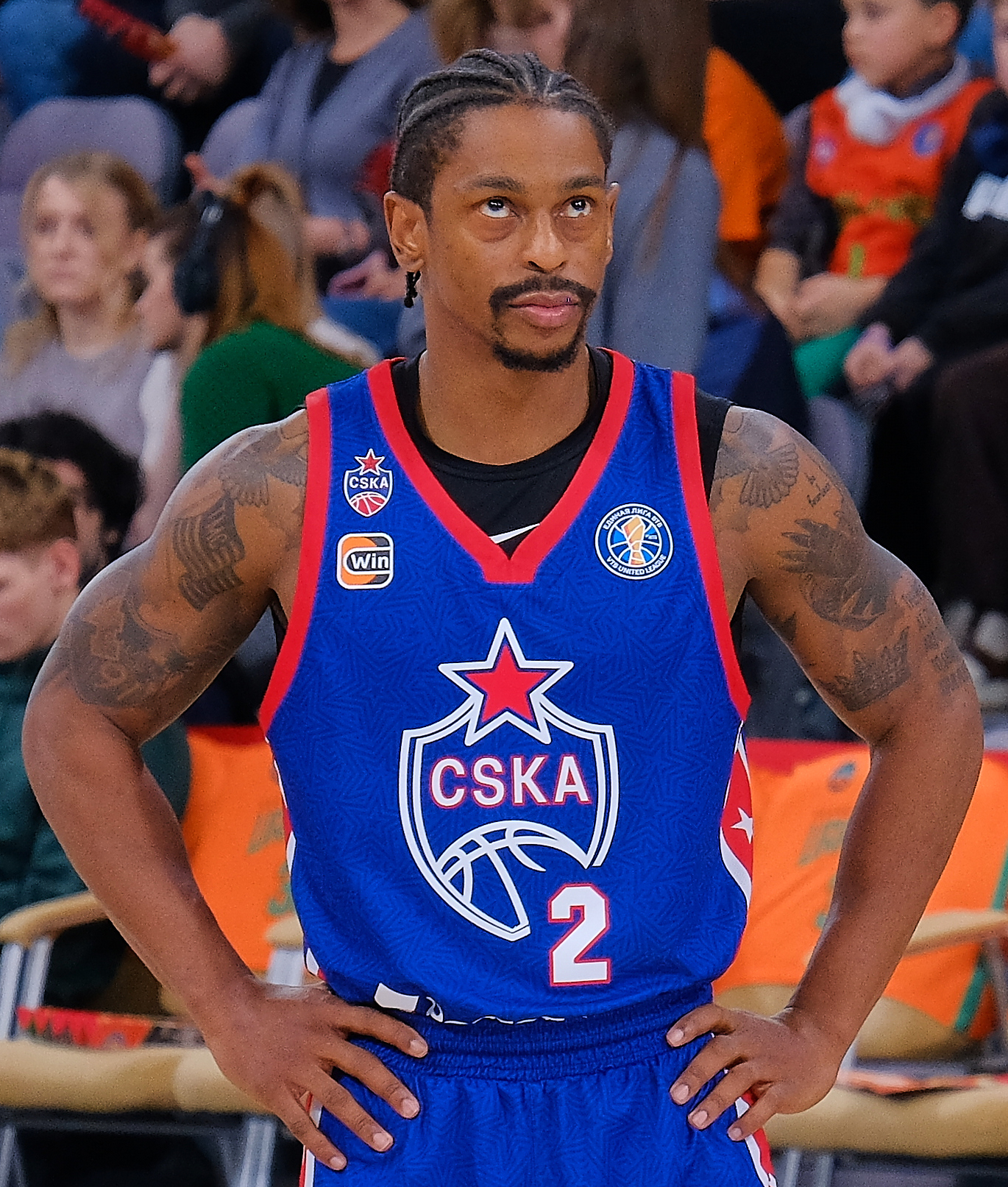
- Ware with CSKA Moscow in 2024

No. 2 – CSKA Moscow
- Position: Point guard
- League: VTB United League

Personal information
- Born: January 17, 1990 (age 36) Cerritos, California, U.S.
- Listed height: 5 ft 10 in (1.78 m)
- Listed weight: 175 lb (79 kg)

Career information
- High school: Gahr (Cerritos, California)
- College: Long Beach State (2008–2012)
- NBA draft: 2012: undrafted
- Playing career: 2012–present

Career history
- 2012–2013: Novipiù Casale Monferrato
- 2013–2014: Virtus Bologna
- 2014: Philadelphia 76ers
- 2014–2015: EWE Baskets Oldenburg
- 2015–2016: Tianjin Ronggang
- 2016: ASVEL
- 2016–2019: Melbourne United
- 2017: ASVEL
- 2019: Stal Ostrów Wielkopolski
- 2019–2021: Sydney Kings
- 2021–2022: BC Enisey
- 2022–present: CSKA Moscow

Career highlights
- VTB United League champion (2024, 2025); VTB United League Supercup winner (2024, 2025); NBL champion (2018); 3× All-NBL First Team (2017–2019); 2× All-NBL Second Team (2020, 2021); LNB Pro A champion (2016); LNB Pro A Finals MVP (2016); German Cup winner (2015); Serie A 2 MVP (2013); 2× Big West Player of the Year (2011, 2012); 3× First-team All-Big West (2010–2012); 2× AP Honorable mention All-American (2011, 2012)
- Stats at NBA.com
- Stats at Basketball Reference

Casper Ware Jr. (born January 17, 1990) is an American professional basketball player for CSKA Moscow of the VTB United League. He played college basketball for the Long Beach State 49ers.

== College career ==
Prior to the start of his senior year, Ware was one of 50 players on the Wooden Award preseason watch list. In the 2012 Big West men's basketball tournament championship game, he scored 33 points against UC Santa Barbara to lead his team to the 2012 NCAA tournament. As a senior at Long Beach State, he averaged 17.2 points, 2.6 rebounds, 4.4 assists and 1.7 steals per game. He was named Big West Conference Men's Basketball Player of the Year and an AP Honorable Mention All-American in 2011 and 2012.

== Professional career ==
=== A.S. Junior Casale (2012–2013) ===
After going undrafted in the 2012 NBA draft, Ware joined the Detroit Pistons for the 2012 NBA Summer League. In August 2012, he signed a one-year deal with A.S. Junior Casale of the Italian 2nd Division. He went on to win the Italian 2nd Division's MVP award after averaging 20.6 points, 3.8 rebounds and 4.8 assists per game.

=== Virtus Bologna (2013–2014) ===
In August 2013, after playing for the Houston Rockets in the 2013 NBA Summer League, Ware signed a one-year deal with Virtus Bologna. On March 10, 2014, he parted ways with Virtus. In 22 games, he averaged 11.7 points, 2.7 rebounds, 2.2 assists and 1.0 steals per game.

=== Philadelphia 76ers (2014) ===
On March 24, 2014, Ware signed a 10-day contract with the Philadelphia 76ers. On March 27, 2014, Ware, in his second game for the 76ers, recorded his first points in the NBA. In just over 22 minutes of action, he recorded 7 points, along with 2 assists, 2 steals and 1 rebound, in a 120–98 loss to the Houston Rockets. He signed a second 10-day contract with the 76ers on April 4, and for the rest of the season on April 15.

In July 2014, Ware joined the 76ers for the 2014 NBA Summer League. On October 24, he was traded to the Brooklyn Nets in exchange for Marquis Teague and a 2019 second-round pick. The next day, he was waived by the Nets.

=== EWE Baskets Oldenburg (2014–2015) ===
On November 1, 2014, Ware signed with EWE Baskets Oldenburg of Germany for the rest of the 2014–15 season. In 27 games, he averaged 13.2 points, 3.1 rebounds and 2.5 assists per game.

=== Tianjin Ronggang (2015–2016) ===
On September 6, 2015, Ware signed with Tianjin Ronggang of the Chinese Basketball Association. In 12 games, he averaged 20.9 points, 4.6 rebounds, 4 assists and 1.3 steals per game.

=== ASVEL Basket and Melbourne United (2016–2019) ===
On March 27, 2016, Ware signed with ASVEL Basket of the French LNB Pro A. In 8 games, he averaged 11.5 points, 2.6 rebounds and 3.4 assists.

After spending preseason with the Washington Wizards, Ware signed with Melbourne United for the rest of the 2016–17 NBL season on November 14, 2016. On November 25, in just his second game for United, Ware scored 28 points and hit the game-winning three-pointer to lift United to a 95–92 win over the Sydney Kings. On December 9, he scored 38 points and hit eight three-pointers in a 92–89 loss to the Perth Wildcats. On December 29, he scored a game-high 24 points and hit the game-winning two-pointer with 3.8 seconds remaining, as United claimed a 79–78 win over the Cairns Taipans. In 18 games, he averaged 22.1 points and 4.5 assists per game.

On March 11, 2017, Ware signed with ASVEL Basket for the rest of the 2016–17 Pro A season.

On August 22, 2017, Ware re-signed with Melbourne United for the 2017–18 NBL season. He helped Melbourne win the championship and earned All-NBL First Team honors for the second straight year. He appeared in all 35 games in 2017–18, averaging 16.7 points, 2.9 rebounds and 4.4 assists per game.

On August 14, 2018, Ware re-signed with United for the 2018–19 NBL season. He helped Melbourne reach the grand final for the second straight year and earned All-NBL First Team honors for the third straight year. In 34 games, he averaged 18.8 points, 3.1 rebounds and 4.4 assists per game.

=== Stal Ostrów Wielkopolski and Sydney Kings (2019–2021) ===
In March 2019, Ware signed with Stal Ostrów Wielkopolski of the Polish Basketball League. In nine games, he averaged 18.7 points, 2.8 rebounds, 5.3 assists and 1.3 steals per game.

On April 11, 2019, Ware signed a multi-year deal with the Sydney Kings of the NBL. He was named to the Second Team All-NBL. On May 4, 2020, Ware opted out of his contract with the Kings after the NBL implemented contract cutting measures due to the COVID-19 pandemic. However, on August 27, Ware re-signed with the Kings.

On April 18, 2021, Ware scored a career-high 40 points in an 89–84 win over the Cairns Taipans.

=== BC Enisey (2021–2022) ===
On August 6, 2021, Ware signed with BC Enisey of the VTB United League. He averaged 16.3 points, 2.3 rebounds and 3.8 assists per game.

=== CSKA Moscow (2022–present) ===
On March 12, 2022, Ware signed with CSKA Moscow of the VTB United League.

== Career statistics ==
Legend
GP	Games played	GS	Games started	MPG	Minutes per game
FG%	Field goal percentage	3P%	3-point field goal percentage	FT%	Free throw percentage
RPG	Rebounds per game	APG	Assists per game	SPG	Steals per game
BPG	Blocks per game	PPG	Points per game	**Bold**	Career high

=== NBA ===
==== Regular season ====
Year	Team	GP	GS	MPG	FG%	3P%	FT%	RPG	APG	SPG	BPG	PPG
2013–14	Philadelphia	9	0	12.9	.429	.333	.833	1.0	1.1	.9	.0	5.3
Career		9	0	12.9	.429	.333	.833	1.0	1.1	.9	.0	5.3

=== NBL ===
==== Regular season ====
Year	Team	GP	GS	MPG	FG%	3P%	FT%	RPG	APG	SPG	BPG	PPG
2016–17	Melbourne	18	18	31.8	.425	.327	.830	2.6	4.5	1.3	.1	**22.1**
2017–18	Melbourne	**28**	**28**	32.2	.368	.328	**.878**	3.0	**4.8**	**1.0**	.1	16.1
2018–19	Melbourne	**28**	**28**	**34.0**	**.403**	**.355**	.837	**3.1**	4.5	.9	.1	18.9
2019–20	Sydney	**28**	**28**	30.2	.385	.302	.788	2.5	3.9	.6	.1	19.6
Career		102	102	33.0	.395	.328	.833	2.8	4.4	.9	.1	18.8
