= Dean Vickerman =

Australian basketball coach

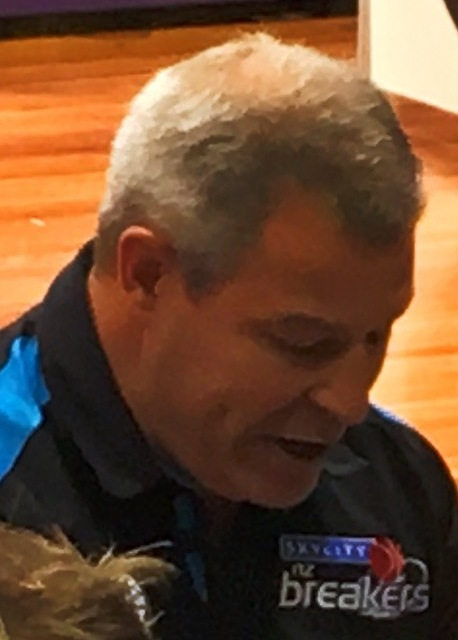
- Vickerman with the New Zealand Breakers in 2015

Nagasaki Velca
- Title: Head coach
- League: B.League

Personal information
- Born: 5 July 1971 (age 55) Warragul, Victoria, Australia
- Listed height: 184 cm (6 ft 0 in)
- Listed weight: 78 kg (172 lb)

Career information
- Playing career: 1990–1992
- Position: Guard
- Coaching career: 1997–present

Career history

Playing
- 1990–1992: Melbourne Tigers

Coaching
- 1997: North Melbourne Giants (assistant)
- 1998–1999: Rockhampton Rockets
- 2000–2001: Sydney Panthers (assistant)
- 2002–2003: Wellington Saints
- 2004–2006: Melbourne Tigers (assistant)
- 2006–2007: Singapore Slingers (assistant)
- 2007–2013: New Zealand Breakers (assistant)
- 2009–2011: Waikato Pistons
- 2013–2016: New Zealand Breakers
- 2016–2017: Sydney Kings (assistant)
- 2017–2026: Melbourne United
- 2026–present: Nagasaki Velca

Career highlights
- As head coach: 3× NBL champion (2015, 2018, 2021); 3× NBL Coach of the Year (2018, 2019, 2024); NZNBL champion (2009); 2× NZNBL Coach of the Year (2009, 2011); As assistant coach: 4× NBL champion (2006, 2011–2013); WNBL champion (2001)

Dean John Vickerman (born 5 July 1971) is an Australian professional basketball coach and former player who currently serves as the head coach of Nagasaki Velca of the Japanese B.League. In the Australian National Basketball League (NBL), Vickerman is a three-time NBL champion as a head coach, having led the New Zealand Breakers to the championship in 2015 and Melbourne United to titles in 2018 and 2021.

== Early life ==
Vickerman was born and raised in Warragul, Victoria.

== Playing career ==
Vickerman played for the Melbourne Tigers of the NBL from 1990 to 1992. He averaged 1.1 points, 0.1 rebounds and 0.2 assists in 16 games.

== Coaching career ==
Between 1997 and 2001, Vickerman served as an assistant coach for the North Melbourne Giants, head coach of the Rockhampton Rockets, and assistant coach of the Sydney Panthers. In 2002, he became head coach of the Wellington Saints, coaching them for just over one season before walking out on the club just four games in the 2003 season because of the club's financial uncertainty.

In 2004, Vickerman guided Melbourne University to a Big V Division One Men title. He subsequently joined the Melbourne Tigers as an assistant coach for the 2004–05 and 2005–06 NBL seasons. For the 2006–07 NBL season, he served as an assistant coach for the Singapore Slingers. During this time, he also served as the head coach of the Singapore national team. Then between 2007 and 2013, he served as an assistant coach for the New Zealand Breakers.

Between 2009 and 2011, Vickerman served as head coach of the Waikato Pistons, where he guided the team to the 2009 championship and earned Coach of the Year honours in 2009 and 2011.

In 2013, he became head coach of the New Zealand Breakers. In 2014–15, he guided the Breakers to their fourth NBL championship in five years. Following the 2015–16 season, he departed the Breakers.

On 6 April 2016, Vickerman was named an assistant coach of the Sydney Kings, appointed alongside Lanard Copeland to serve under newly-appointed head coach Andrew Gaze.

On 17 March 2017, Vickerman was appointed head coach of Melbourne United for two seasons. In March 2018, he guided Melbourne to the NBL championship. On 7 October 2018, his contract was extended with United for an additional three years, keeping him in Melbourne until the end of the 2021–22 season. In June 2021, he guided Melbourne to the NBL championship. On 8 November 2021, his contract was extended for a further two seasons.

On 19 April 2023, Vickerman signed a four-year contract extension with United. He coached his 300th NBL game in October 2023. He coached his 350th NBL game in January 2025.

On 5 May 2026, Vickerman parted ways with United after nine seasons.

On 19 June 2026, Vickerman was appointed head coach of Nagasaki Velca of the Japanese B.League.

== National team career ==
In February 2023, Vickerman was appointed head coach of the Australian Boomers for the FIBA World Cup qualifiers.

In March 2025, Vickerman was appointed associate head coach for the Boomers under new coach Adam Caporn. Vickerman assumed lead responsibilities for the first window of the FIBA Basketball World Cup 2027 Asian Qualifiers whilst Caporn tended to in-season duties with the Washington Wizards.

== Personal life ==
Vickerman and his wife Christy have three children.
