= 2020–21 Cairns Taipans season =

- Head coach: (United States) Mike Kelly
- Captain: (Brazil) Scott Machado
- Arena: Cairns Pop-Up Arena

NBL results
- Record: 8–28 (22.2%)
- Ladder: 9th
- Finals finish: Did not qualify
- Biggest win: 15 points 84–69 (Breakers)
- Biggest defeat: 29 points 106–77 (@ Phoenix)
- Stats at NBL.com.au

Cup results
- Record: 2–6 (25%)
- Ladder: 9th
- Cup finish: N/A

Home Attendance
- Highest attendance: 1,945 (29 March 2021)
- Lowest attendance: 1,808 (18 January 2021)
- Average attendance: 1,879

Player records
- Points: (United States) Oliver 17.3
- Rebounds: (United States) Oliver 10.0
- Assists: (Brazil) Machado 7.0
- Efficiency: (Australia) Jawai 55%
- All statistics correct as of 30 May 2021.

The 2020–21 Cairns Taipans season was the 22nd season for the Cairns Taipans in the NBL, and their third and final season under the guidance of Head Coach Mike Kelly.

== Season summary ==
After a successful campaign the season prior, the Taipans faced an early setback when it was announced that the redevelopment of the Cairns Convention Centre had been delayed and was unavailable for use until early February 2020, two months after the NBL announced the delayed season would start. After meeting with the Queensland Minister for Housing, Public Works and Sports Mick de Brenni, it was announced that the redevelopment timeline would not be adjusted for the Taipans. Following more discussions between the club and the state government, it was announced that the government would redevelop an old warehouse capable to host games across the two month period between the start of the season and when the Convention Centre becomes available, with the temporary stadium able to hold 2,000 seats.

== Squad ==
=== Signings ===
- The Taipans only retained one of their players over the off-season, Majok Deng, who had signed a multiple season contract before the 2019–20 season. Head Coach Mike Kelly had also already signed for the 2020–21 season.
- On 13 March 2020, Mojave King was signed as a Next Star player. King signed with the Taipans on a three-year deal as part of the Next Stars program, which "contracts Draft eligible players in order to prepare and fast-track them to the NBA, providing an alternative option to attending college."
- On 7 March 2020, the Taipans announced that they'd taken the club option on the contracts of Mirko Djeric, Fabijan Krslovic and Kouat Noi, who would all return to Cairns on a one-year deal.
- On 3 August 2020, the Taipans re-signed co-captain Nathan Jawai on a two-year deal, extending his stint at the club to at least seven years.
- On 6 August 2020, Jarrod Kenny joined the list of returning Taipans and signed a one-season deal with the club.
- On 14 August 2020, the Taipans signed Jordan Ngatai to a two-year deal.
- On 3 September 2020, George Blagojevic re-signed with the club on a two-year deal (with the second year being a club option).
- On 16 November 2020, Cameron Oliver re-signed with the Snakes on a two-year deal, signing as the team's first import for the 2020–21 season,
- On 22 November 2020, Scott Machado completed the Taipans' roster by also signing a two-year deal.
- On 22 December 2020, Jordan Hunt was announced as the Taipans only development player for the season. Tad Dufelmeier and Koen Sapwell were also announced as the training players for the club. Dufelmeier would later be promoted to the playing roster to cover the injury of Deng.
- After both Deng and Noi were injured throughout the season, on 2 April 2021, Hyrum Harris was signed as a nominated injury player.
- On 18 April 2020, Oliver's contract was waived for the season to allow him to return home to the U.S. to support his wife during her pregnancy.
- On 20 April 2020, Venky Jois was signed for the remainder of the season.
- On 30 May 2021, the Taipans announced that Head Coach Kelly wouldn't be returning to the club for the final year of his contract.

=== Roster ===
Note: Flags indicate national team eligibility at FIBA-sanctioned events. Players may hold other non-FIBA nationalities not displayed.

2020–21 Cairns Taipans roster
Players
Coaches

Pos.	No.	Nat.	Name	Ht.	Wt.	Age
F	0	(United States)	Oliver, Cameron (I, IN)	2.03 m (6 ft 8 in)	102 kg (225 lb)	30 – 11 July 1996
G	1	(New Zealand)	King, Mojave (injured) (NS)	1.95 m (6 ft 5 in)	88 kg (194 lb)	24 – 11 June 2002
G	3	(Brazil)	Machado, Scott (I & C)	1.85 m (6 ft 1 in)	82 kg (181 lb)	36 – 8 June 1990
G	4	(Australia)	Dufelmeier, Tad	1.83 m (6 ft 0 in)	79 kg (174 lb)	30 – 9 February 1996
G	5	(Australia)	Đerić, Mirko	1.88 m (6 ft 2 in)	82 kg (181 lb)	31 – 17 April 1995
G	6	(New Zealand)	Kenny, Jarrod	1.88 m (6 ft 2 in)	87 kg (192 lb)	41 – 17 September 1985
F	9	(Australia)	Blagojevic, George	2.03 m (6 ft 8 in)	100 kg (220 lb)	29 – 18 October 1996
C	10	(New Zealand)	Hunt, Jordan (DP)	2.06 m (6 ft 9 in)	108 kg (238 lb)	29 – 12 September 1997
F	11	(New Zealand)	Ngatai, Jordan	1.96 m (6 ft 5 in)	98 kg (216 lb)	33 – 7 March 1993
F	12	(Australia)	Noi, Kouat (injured)	2.01 m (6 ft 7 in)	93 kg (205 lb)	28 – 29 October 1997
F	13	(South Sudan)	Deng, Majok	2.08 m (6 ft 10 in)	84 kg (185 lb)	33 – 1 March 1993
C	15	(Australia)	Jawai, Nathan	2.09 m (6 ft 10 in)	140 kg (309 lb)	39 – 10 October 1986
F	20	(Australia)	Krslovic, Fabijan (injured)	2.03 m (6 ft 8 in)	108 kg (238 lb)	31 – 23 June 1995
F	55	(Australia)	Jois, Venky (IN)	2.03 m (6 ft 8 in)	104 kg (229 lb)	33 – 7 July 1993

Head coach

- (United States) Mike Kelly

Assistant coach(es)

- (Australia) Jamie O'Loughlin
- (Australia) Brad Hill
- (Australia) Lennon Smartt

Team manager

- (Australia) Brett Havercroft

Legend

- (C) Team captain
- (DP) Development player
- (IN) Inactive
- (I) Import player
- (TP) Training player
- (NS) Next Star player
- Injured

- Roster
Updated: 4 May 2021

=== Depth chart ===
Pos.	Starting 5	Bench 1	Bench 2	Development
C	Nathan Jawai			Jordan Hunt
PF	Majok Deng	Venky Jois	Fabijan Krslovic (injured)
SF	Jordan Ngatai	George Blagojevic	Kouat Noi (injured)
SG	Mojave King	Mirko Djeric
PG	Scott Machado	Tad Dufelmeier	Jarrod Kenny

== Pre-season ==
=== Ladder ===
2020–21 NBL pre-season ladder
Ladder
Information

Pos.	Nat.	Name	Pld.	W.	L.	Last 5	Streak	Home	Away	For	Against	Pts %	Win %
1	(Australia)	Melbourne	1	1	0	1–0	W1	0–0	1–0	97	81	119.75%	100.00%
2	(Australia)	Sydney	1	1	0	1–0	W1	1–0	0–0	98	89	110.11%	100.00%
3	(Australia)	Adelaide	3	2	1	2–1	L1	2–0	0–1	276	225	122.67%	66.67%
4	(Australia)	Perth (RC)	2	1	1	1–1	L1	1–1	0–0	165	165	100.00%	50.00%
5	(Australia)	Cairns	2	1	1	1–1	W1	1–1	0–0	177	185	95.68%	50.00%
6	(Australia)	Brisbane	4	2	2	2–2	W2	2–0	0–2	347	378	91.80%	50.00%
7	(Australia)	Illawarra	3	1	2	1–2	L1	0–0	1–2	254	263	96.58%	33.33%
8	(Australia)	S.E. Melbourne	2	0	2	0–2	L2	0–0	0–2	198	210	94.29%	0.00%

Total Rounds
5 weeks

Total Games
11 games

Legend
- (RC) Reigning Champion

- Updated: 9 January 2021

=== Game log ===
==== December ====
NBL TV

31 December 2020
18:00

boxscore
broadcast
report

Cairns Taipans 81, Melbourne United 97
Scoring by quarter: 24–18, 13–22, 20–31, 24–26
Pts: King 21; Rebs: Krslovic 7 Asts: Machado 6	Pts: Goulding 17; Rebs: Landale 8 Asts: McCarron 5

Cairns Pop-Up Arena, Cairns
Referees: Vaughan Mayberry, Alex McEwan, Jacqui Dover

==== January ====
NBL TV

9 January 2021
18:00

boxscore
broadcast
report

Cairns Taipans 96, Adelaide 36ers 88
Scoring by quarter: 26–22, 15–18, 27–26, 28–22
Pts: Noi 22; Rebs: Oliver 11; Asts: Machado 8	Pts: Sloan 24; Rebs: Johnson 10; Asts: Dillon 3

Cairns Pop-Up Arena, Cairns
Attendance: 1,000
Referees: Marc Mill, Alex McEwan, Jacqui Dover

== Regular season ==
=== Ladder ===
Pos	2020–21 NBL season											
Pos	Team	Pld	W	L	PCT	Last 5	Streak	Home	Away	PF	PA	PP
1	Melbourne United	36	28	8	77.78%	4–1	W3	14–4	14–4	3189	2956	107.88%
2	Perth Wildcats	36	25	11	69.44%	3–2	L2	13–5	12–6	3133	2900	108.03%
3	Illawarra Hawks	36	20	16	55.56%	4–1	L1	11–7	9–9	2962	2954	100.27%
4	S.E. Melbourne Phoenix	36	19	17	52.78%	2–3	L1	9–9	10–8	3217	3124	102.98%
5	Sydney Kings	36	19	17	52.78%	4–1	W3	11–7	8–10	3112	3087	100.81%
6	Brisbane Bullets	36	18	18	50.00%	4–1	W1	9–9	9–9	3204	3274	97.86%
7	Adelaide 36ers	36	13	23	36.11%	0–5	L7	10–8	3–15	2985	3156	94.58%
8	New Zealand Breakers	36	12	24	33.33%	2–3	L1	8–10	4–14	2937	3021	97.22%
9	Cairns Taipans	36	8	28	22.22%	1–4	L2	6–12	2–16	2940	3207	91.67%

Updated to match(es) played on 9 June 2021. Source: NBL.com.au

=== Ladder progression ===
- Numbers highlighted in green indicate that the team finished the round inside the top four.
- Numbers highlighted in blue indicates the team finished first on the ladder in that round.
- Numbers highlighted in red indicates the team finished last place on the ladder in that round.

2020–21 NBL season
Team	1	2	3	4	5	NBL Cup				10	11	12	13	14	15	16	17	18	19	20	21
Team	1	2	3	4	5	6	7	8	9	10	11	12	13	14	15	16	17	18	19	20	21
Adelaide 36ers	3	5	3	3	3	4	6	5	7	7	7	7	7	7	7	7	7	7	7	7	7
Brisbane Bullets	6	9	5	6	6	7	5	4	5	5	6	6	5	6	6	6	6	6	6	6	6
Cairns Taipans	4	7	8	8	8	8	9	9	9	9	9	9	9	9	9	9	9	9	9	9	9
Illawarra Hawks	2	3	1	2	2	2	4	3	3	4	3	5	4	5	5	5	5	4	4	3	3
Melbourne United	1	1	2	1	1	1	1	1	1	2	2	2	1	1	1	1	1	1	1	1	1
New Zealand Breakers	–	8	9	9	9	9	8	8	8	8	8	8	8	8	8	8	8	8	8	8	8
Perth Wildcats	–	2	4	7	7	3	2	2	2	1	1	1	2	2	2	2	2	2	2	2	2
S.E. Melbourne Phoenix	7	6	6	4	4	5	3	7	4	3	4	3	3	3	4	4	4	3	3	4	4
Sydney Kings	5	4	7	5	5	6	7	6	6	6	5	4	6	4	3	3	3	5	5	5	5

=== Game log ===
==== Round 1 ====
ESPN

16 January 2021
19:00

boxscore
report

Cairns Taipans 87, Sydney Kings 86
Scoring by quarter: 24–30, 26–21, 14–19, 23–16
Pts: Machado 17; Rebs: Oliver 11; Asts: Machado 8	Pts: Ware 18; Rebs: Martin 8 Asts: Bruce 4

Cairns Pop-Up Arena, Cairns
Attendance: 1,919
Referees: Chris Reid, Nathan Durant, Daniel Battye

ESPN

18 January 2021
18:30

boxscore
report

Cairns Taipans 76, The Hawks 92
Scoring by quarter: 19–31, 22–19, 19–19, 16–23
Pts: Deng 20; Rebs: Oliver 12; Asts: Machado 11	Pts: Harvey 25; Rebs: Simon 12; Asts: Harvey 7

Cairns Pop-Up Arena, Cairns
Attendance: 1,808
Referees: Chris Reid, Daniel Battye, Mitch Hare

==== Round 2 ====
ESPN

23 January 2021
19:00

boxscore
report

Cairns Taipans 91, Sydney Kings 99
Scoring by quarter: 22–23, 15–23, 34–26, 20–27
Pts: Oliver 27; Rebs: Oliver 10; Asts: Machado 9	Pts: Martin, Ware 22; Rebs: Martin 11; Asts: Bruce, Moller 4

Cairns Pop-Up Arena, Cairns
Attendance: 1,930
Referees: Vaughan Mayberry, Mitch Hare, Ruben Woolcock

ESPN

25 January 2021
18:30

boxscore
report

Cairns Taipans 85, Melbourne United 87
Scoring by quarter: 21–29, 24–22, 17–18, 23–18
Pts: Machado 19; Rebs: Oliver 13; Asts: Machado 6	Pts: Landale 19; Rebs: Lual-Acuil 11; Asts: Ili, McCarron 4

Cairns Pop-Up Arena, Cairns
Attendance: 1,896
Referees: Chris Reid, Daniel Battye, Ruben Woolcock

==== Round 3 ====
ESPN

28 January 2021
18:30

boxscore
report

Cairns Taipans 70, The Hawks 90
Scoring by quarter: 12–19, 24–26, 19–16, 15–29
Pts: Oliver 20; Rebs: Oliver 11; Asts: Machado 7	Pts: Harvey 21; Rebs: Simon 8 Asts: Simon 5

Cairns Pop-Up Arena, Cairns
Attendance: 1,849
Referees: Chris Reid, Mitch Hare, Ruben Woolcock

SBS Viceland

30 January 2021
16:30

boxscore
report

Brisbane Bullets 105, Cairns Taipans 103 (OT)
Scoring by quarter: 19–23, 21–32, 21–17, 29–18, Overtime: 15–13
Pts: Sobey 30; Rebs: Law 11; Asts: Sobey 5	Pts: Machado 23; Rebs: Oliver 8 Asts: Machado 10

Nissan Arena, Brisbane
Attendance: 4,065
Referees: Chris Reid, Nathan Durrant, Marc Mill

==== Round 4 ====
SBS Viceland

6 February 2021
16:30

boxscore
report

Cairns Taipans 79, New Zealand Breakers 85
Scoring by quarter: 20–25, 24–16, 22–18, 13–26
Pts: Machado 25; Rebs: Oliver 10; Asts: Machado 12	Pts: T. Webster 25; Rebs: T. Webster 11; Asts: T. Webster 5

Cairns Pop-Up Arena, Cairns
Attendance: 1,891
Referees: James Boyer, Vaughan Mayberry, Marc Mill

ESPN

8 February 2021
18:30

boxscore
report

Cairns Taipans 84, New Zealand Breakers 69
Scoring by quarter: 22–16, 21–16, 23–18, 18–19
Pts: Deng 21; Rebs: Oliver 11; Asts: Machado 11	Pts: T. Webster 13; Rebs: Abercrombie 7 Asts: Patterson 4

Cairns Pop-Up Arena, Cairns
Attendance: 1,828
Referees: Vaughan Mayberry, Nathan Durant, Marc Mill

==== NBL Cup ====
===== Round 6 =====
ESPN

20 February 2021
15:00

boxscore
report

Cairns Taipans 101, Illawarra Hawks 95
Scoring by quarter: 19–18, 21–27, 28–26, 33–24
Pts: Machado 31; Rebs: Machado, Oliver 8 Asts: Machado 6	Pts: Harvey 24; Rebs: Froling 12; Asts: Harvey 6

John Cain Arena, Melbourne
Attendance: 3,711
Referees: Vaughan Mayberry, Mitch Hare, Ruben Woolcock

ESPN

22 February 2021
19:30

boxscore
report

Melbourne United 88, Cairns Taipans 81
Scoring by quarter: 17–25, 18–17, 23–20, 30–19
Pts: Landale 18; Rebs: Landale 11; Asts: McCarron 8	Pts: Noi 27; Rebs: Krslovic 7 Asts: Machado 9

John Cain Arena, Melbourne
Attendance: 2,313
Referees: Vaughan Mayberry, Damian Lyons, Elliot Green

===== Round 7 =====
ESPN

26 February 2021
19:30

boxscore
report

Cairns Taipans 69, Perth Wildcats 89
Scoring by quarter: 17–25, 24–18, 9–18, 19–28
Pts: Oliver 19; Rebs: Oliver 14; Asts: Machado 8	Pts: Cotton 23; Rebs: Mooney 12; Asts: Cotton 8

John Cain Arena, Melbourne
Attendance: 809
Referees: Scott Beker, Nathan Durant, Daniel Battye

SBS Viceland

28 February 2021
16:30

boxscore
report

Brisbane Bullets 115, Cairns Taipans 99
Scoring by quarter: 25–28, 35–23, 26–22, 29–22
Pts: Sobey 30; Rebs: Froling 11; Asts: Cadee 6	Pts: Machado 26; Rebs: Oliver 6 Asts: Scott Machado 6

John Cain Arena, Melbourne
Attendance: 3,195
Referees: Scott Beker, Mitch Hare, Elliot Green

===== Round 8 =====
ESPN

4 March 2021
17:00

boxscore
report

Cairns Taipans 96, Sydney Kings 92
Scoring by quarter: 26–28, 25–13, 22–26, 23–25
Pts: Machado 24; Rebs: Krslovic 10; Asts: Machado 4	Pts: Vasiljevic 32; Rebs: Hunter 6 Asts: Moller, Ware 4

State Basketball Centre, Melbourne
Attendance: 1,355
Referees: Chris Reid, Damian Lyon, Alex McEwan

SBS Viceland

6 March 2021
17:30

boxscore
report

Adelaide 36ers 81, Cairns Taipans 71
Scoring by quarter: 19–21, 22–17, 18–18, 22–15
Pts: Johnson 30; Rebs: Johnson 9 Asts: Giddey 8	Pts: Krslovic 12; Rebs: Machado, Oliver 6 Asts: Machado 7

John Cain Arena, Melbourne
Attendance: 3,708
Referees: Chris Reid, Ruben Woolcock, Alex McEwan

===== Round 9 =====
ESPN

10 March 2021
17:00

boxscore
report

New Zealand Breakers 86, Cairns Taipans 83
Scoring by quarter: 24–11, 22–21, 14–20, 16–21
Pts: Abercrombie 20; Rebs: Iverson 11; Asts: T. Webster 4	Pts: Oliver 19; Rebs: Oliver 7 Asts: Machado 4

John Cain Arena, Melbourne
Attendance: 3,675
Referees: Michael Aylen, Nathan Durant, Travis Stewart

ESPN

12 March 2021
19:30

boxscore
report

Cairns Taipans 81, South East Melbourne Phoenix 85
Scoring by quarter: 14–20, 22–27, 19–18, 26–20
Pts: Machado 24; Rebs: Krslovic 8 Asts: Djeric, Machado 3	Pts: Creek 21; Rebs: Gliddon, Wetzell 8 Asts: Gliddon 5

John Cain Arena, Melbourne
Attendance: 2,478
Referees: Michael Aylen, Hugh Starkey, Daniel Troy

==== Round 10 ====
ESPN

19 March 2021
18:30

boxscore
report

Perth Wildcats 93, Cairns Taipans 75
Scoring by quarter: 31–19, 24–21, 18–17, 20–18
Pts: Cotton 28; Rebs: Mooney 8 Asts: Cotton 5	Pts: Machado 16; Rebs: Noi 9 Asts: Noi 3

RAC Arena, Perth
Attendance: 9,997
Referees: Chris Reid, Mitch Hare, Craig Copes

SBS Viceland

21 March 2021
17:00

boxscore
report

Sydney Kings 75, Cairns Taipans 73
Scoring by quarter: 20–21, 23–16, 12–20, 20–16
Pts: Martin, Ware 16; Rebs: Moller 8 Asts: Louzada, Martin, Moller, Vasiljevic, Ware 2	Pts: Machado 21; Rebs: Oliver 7 Asts: Machado 7

Qudos Bank Arena, Sydney
Attendance: 5,187
Referees: Scott Beker, Damian Lyons, Daniel Battye

==== Round 11 ====
SBS Viceland

28 March 2021
16:00

boxscore
report

Cairns Taipans 79, Adelaide 36ers 65
Scoring by quarter: 24–18, 22–16, 12–16, 21–15
Pts: Oliver 19; Rebs: Oliver 9 Asts: Machado 6	Pts: Johnson 21; Rebs: Johnson 8 Asts: Dech 5

Cairns Pop-Up Arena, Cairns
Attendance: 1,945
Referees: Vaughan Mayberry, Marc Mill, Alex McEwan

==== Round 12 ====
SBS Viceland

2 April 2021
17:30

boxscore
report

Melbourne United 95, Cairns Taipans 85
Scoring by quarter: 26–21, 23–24, 24–19, 22–21
Pts: Landale 20; Rebs: Landale 11; Asts: McCarron 5	Pts: Oliver 19; Rebs: Oliver 12; Asts: Machado 6

John Cain Arena, Melbourne
Attendance: 3,673
Referees: Chris Reid, Damian Lyons, Elliot Green

SBS Viceland

4 April 2021
17:00

boxscore
report

Cairns Taipans 73, Melbourne United 83
Scoring by quarter: 22–24, 18–19, 20–19, 13–21
Pts: Machado 20; Rebs: Oliver 10; Asts: Machado 7	Pts: Goulding 15; Rebs: Lual-Acuil 10; Asts: Landale, McCarron 6

Cairns Pop-Up Arena, Cairns
Attendance: 1,847
Referees: Vaughan Mayberry, Alex McEwan, Marc Mill

==== Round 13 ====
SBS Viceland

11 April 2021
17:00

boxscore
report

Illawarra Hawks 82, Cairns Taipans 80
Scoring by quarter: 25–20, 21–15, 10–16, 26–29
Pts: Harvey 35; Rebs: Ogilvy 9 Asts: Ogilvy 5	Pts: Oliver 27; Rebs: Oliver 12; Asts: Oliver 5

WIN Entertainment Centre, Wollongong
Attendance: 3,064
Referees: Vaughan Mayberry, Mitch Hare, Mark Grist

==== Round 14 ====
ESPN

14 April 2021
19:30

boxscore
report

Cairns Taipans 91, Adelaide 36ers 88
Scoring by quarter: 17–26, 28–22, 21–20, 25–20
Pts: Oliver 25; Rebs: Oliver 17; Asts: Dufelmeier 8	Pts: Johnson 24; Rebs: Giddey 7 Asts: Giddey 9

Cairns Pop-Up Arena, Cairns
Attendance: 1,869
Referees: Michael Aylen, Marc Mill, Alex McEwan

ESPN

17 April 2021
20:00

boxscore
report

Sydney Kings 89, Cairns Taipans 84
Scoring by quarter: 27–12, 22–26, 16–27, 24–19
Pts: Ware 40; Rebs: Hunter 8 Asts: Bruce 4	Pts: Oliver 27; Rebs: Oliver 19; Asts: Dufelmeier, Machado 5

Qudos Bank Arena, Sydney
Attendance: 5,214
Referees: Scott Beker, Nathan Durant, Daniel Battye

==== Round 15 ====
ESPN

23 April 2021
19:30

boxscore
report

New Zealand Breakers 68, Cairns Taipans 70
Scoring by quarter: 10–12, 15–27, 19–17, 24–14
Pts: Delany 23; Rebs: Delany 14; Asts: C. Webster 7	Pts: Jawai 21; Rebs: Jawai 8 Asts: Machado 8

Silverdome, Launceston
Attendance: 1,287
Referees: Scott Beker, Damian Lyons, Ruben Woolcock

SBS Viceland

25 April 2021
17:00

boxscore
report

Cairns Taipans 66, South East Melbourne Phoenix 86
Scoring by quarter: 16–29, 23–18, 14–28, 13–15
Pts: Jois 12; Rebs: Jawai, Jois 8 Asts: Machado 4	Pts: Gliddon 22; Rebs: Creek 8 Asts: Mauriohooho-Le'afa 4

Cairns Pop-Up Arena, Cairns
Attendance: 1,905
Referees: Vaughan Mayberry, Daniel Battye, Marc Mill

==== Round 16 ====
ESPN

4 May 2021
19:00

boxscore
report

Adelaide 36ers 92, Cairns Taipans 76
Scoring by quarter: 27–9, 19–21, 23–17, 23–29
Pts: Paul 18; Rebs: Johnson, Paul 10; Asts: Giddey 6	Pts: Deng 16; Rebs: Jois 9 Asts: Machado 7

Adelaide Entertainment Centre, Adelaide
Attendance: 7,001
Referees: Michael Aylen, Nathan Durant, Hugh Starkey

==== Round 17 ====
ESPN

8 May 2021
20:00

boxscore
report

Cairns Taipans 87, Brisbane Bullets 96
Scoring by quarter: 25–30, 20–27, 21–21, 21–18
Pts: Jawai 20; Rebs: Deng 9 Asts: Machado 7	Pts: Sobey 25; Rebs: Harrison, Sobey 9 Asts: Sobey 5

Cairns Pop-Up Arena, Cairns
Attendance: 1,903
Referees: Chris Reid, Nathan Durant, Alex McEwan

==== Round 18 ====
ESPN

14 May 2021
19:30

boxscore
report

South East Melbourne Phoenix 106, Cairns Taipans 77
Scoring by quarter: 21–20, 36–25, 29–14, 20–18
Pts: Creek 20; Rebs: Wetzell 11; Asts: Sykes 4	Pts: Djeric 17; Rebs: Blagojevic, Jois 4 Asts: Dufelmeier 4

John Cain Arena, Melbourne
Attendance: 1,711
Referees: Chris Reid, Daniel Battye, Marty Davison

ESPN

17 May 2021
19:30

boxscore
report

Cairns Taipans 78, Perth Wildcats 89
Scoring by quarter: 26–28, 18–17, 21–20, 13–24
Pts: Jawai 20; Rebs: Jawai 9 Asts: Machado 8	Pts: Cotton 24; Rebs: Mooney 10; Asts: Cotton

Cairns Pop-Up Arena, Cairns
Attendance: 1,811
Referees: Damian Lyons, Daniel Battye, Mark Mill

==== Round 19 ====
ESPN

21 May 2021
19:30

boxscore
report

Perth Wildcats 100, Cairns Taipans 79
Scoring by quarter: 26–28, 21–14, 30–14, 23–23
Pts: Blanchfield, Cotton 19; Rebs: Magnay 9 Asts: Norton 5	Pts: Djeric 15; Rebs: Jois 5 Asts: Dufelmeier 6

RAC Arena, Perth
Attendance: 10,671
Referees: James Boyer, Mitch Hare, Craig Copes

SBS Viceland

23 May 2021
17:00

boxscore
report

Illawarra Hawks 93, Cairns Taipans 81
Scoring by quarter: 21–23, 27–30, 23–6, 24–22
Pts: Jessup 24; Rebs: Oglivy 11; Asts: Harvey 9	Pts: Machado 17; Rebs: Jois, Krslovic, Machado 4 Asts: Machado 9

WIN Entertainment Centre, Wollongong
Attendance: 2,258
Referees: James Boyer, Mitch Hare, Mark Grist

==== Round 20 ====
ESPN

26 May 2021
19:30

boxscore
report

Cairns Taipans 96, Brisbane Bullets 101
Scoring by quarter: 25–24, 22–28, 28–29, 21–20
Pts: King 25; Rebs: Jawai 7 Asts: Machado 11	Pts: Sobey 21; Rebs: Froling 8 Asts: Sobey 8

Cairns Pop-Up Arena, Cairns
Attendance: 1,908
Referees: Damian Lyons, James Griguol, Jacqui Dover

ESPN

28 May 2021
19:30

boxscore
report

South East Melbourne Phoenix 87, Cairns Taipans 94
Scoring by quarter: 22–24, 2520, 26–19, 14–31
Pts: Wetzell 25; Rebs: Wetzell 7 Asts: Sykes 7	Pts: Deng 22; Rebs: Jawai 10; Asts: Dufelmeier, Jawai 5

Cairns Pop-Up Arena, Cairns
Attendance: 1,251
Referees: Damian Lyons, Ruben Woolcock, Mark Mill

ESPN

31 May 2021
19:30

boxscore
report

Melbourne United 101, Cairns Taipans 76
Scoring by quarter: 29–13, 26–29, 22–13, 24–21
Pts: Landale 19; Rebs: Peatling 11; Asts: Hopson 5	Pts: Djeric 16; Rebs: Jawai 6 Asts: Djeric, Machado 3

Qudos Bank Arena, Sydney
Attendance: closed event
Referees: Chris Reid, Mitch Hare, Jacqui Dover

==== Round 21 ====
ESPN

2 June 2021
19:30

boxscore
report

New Zealand Breakers 84, Cairns Taipans 78
Scoring by quarter: 25–16, 16–26, 14–17, 29–19
Pts: T. Webster 23; Rebs: Iverson 12; Asts: C. Webster 4	Pts: Machado 21; Rebs: Jawai 8 Asts: Machado 10

Energy Events Centre, Rotorua
Attendance: 2,435
Referees: Nathan Durant, Marty Davison, Ryan Jones

== Awards ==
=== Regular season ===
==== Player of the Week ====
Round 4, Scott Machado

Round 14, Cameron Oliver

==== MVP ====
Round 1, vs Sydney Kings: Scott Machado

Round 4, vs New Zealand Breakers: Majok Deng

Round 6, vs Illawarra Hawks: Scott Machado

Round 8, vs Sydney Kings: Nathan Jawai

Round 11, vs Adelaide 36ers: Cameron Oliver

Round 14, vs Adelaide 36ers: Cameron Oliver

Round 15, @ New Zealand Breakers: Nathan Jawai

Round 20, @ South East Melbourne Phoenix: Mirko Djeric

== See also ==
- 2020–21 NBL season
- Cairns Taipans
