= Trevor Gleeson =

Australian professional basketball coach (born 1968)

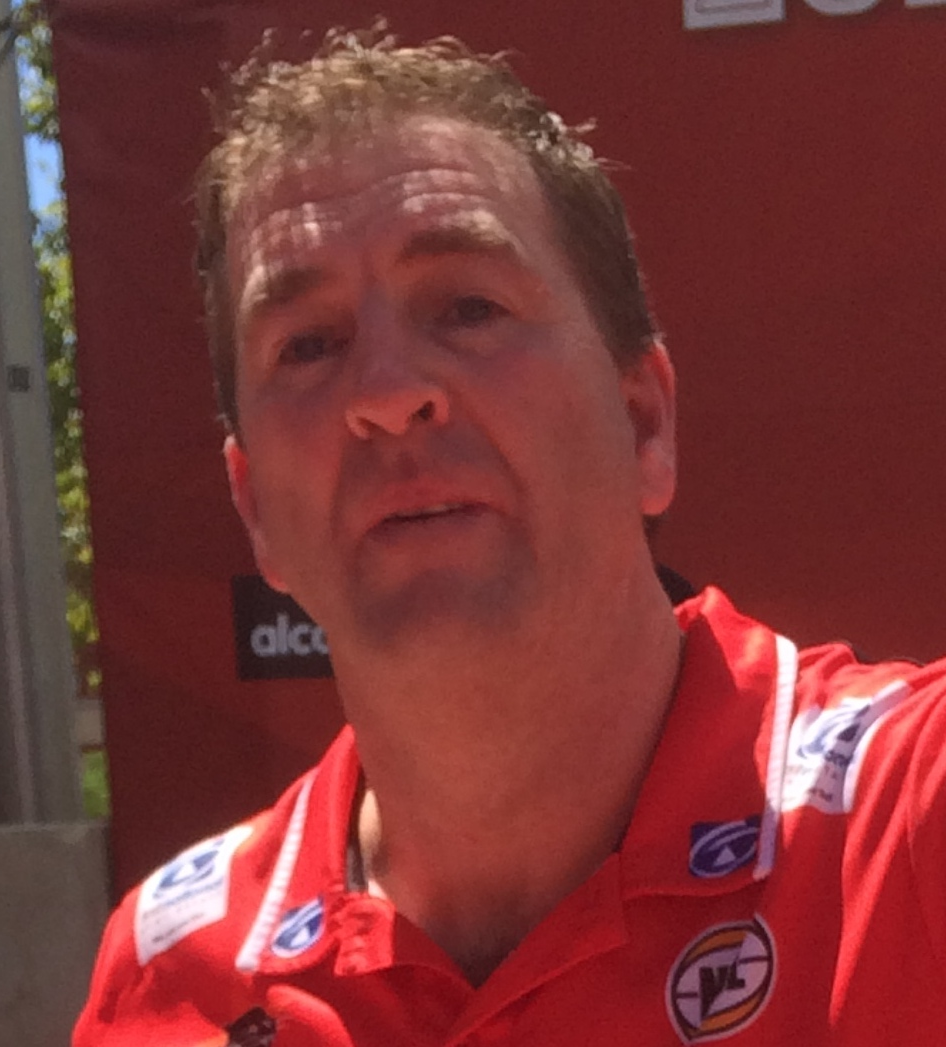
- Gleeson with the Perth Wildcats in 2017

Adelaide 36ers
- Position: Head coach
- League: NBL

Personal information
- Born: 28 May 1968 (age 58)

Career information
- High school: Emmanuel College (Warrnambool, Victoria)
- Coaching career: 1990–present

Career history

Coaching
- 1990–1991: Warrnambool Mermaids
- 1992–1993: Warrnambool Seahawks
- 1997–2000: Brisbane Bullets (assistant)
- 2000–2001: Quad City Thunder (assistant)
- 2001–2002: Sioux Falls Skyforce (assistant)
- 2003–2004: Sioux Falls Skyforce
- 2004–2005: Seoul Samsung Thunders (assistant)
- 2005–2006: Jeonju KCC Egis (assistant)
- 2006–2011: Townsville Crocodiles
- 2011–2012: Melbourne Tigers
- 2013–2021: Perth Wildcats
- 2021–2023: Toronto Raptors (assistant)
- 2023–2024: Milwaukee Bucks (assistant)
- 2024–2026: Chiba Jets
- 2026–present: Adelaide 36ers

Career highlights
- 5× NBL champion (2014, 2016, 2017, 2019, 2020); NBL Cup winner (2021); 2× NBL Coach of the Year (2011, 2021)

Trevor Gleeson (born 28 May 1968) is an Australian professional basketball coach who is currently head coach of the Adelaide 36ers of the National Basketball League (NBL). He first coached in the NBL between 1997 and 2000 as an assistant with the Brisbane Bullets. After six years in the Continental Basketball Association and Korean Basketball League, he returned to the NBL in 2006 to coach the Townsville Crocodiles, where he was named NBL Coach of the Year in 2011. After a season with the Melbourne Tigers, he coached the Perth Wildcats between 2013 and 2021, winning five NBL championships in 2014, 2016, 2017, 2019 and 2020, and earning NBL Coach of the Year for the second time in 2021. As of 2021, he ranked fifth all-time in NBL history for games coached. Between 2021 and 2024, Gleeson served as an assistant coach in the National Basketball Association (NBA) for the Toronto Raptors (2021–23) and Milwaukee Bucks (2023–24). After two years as head coach of the Chiba Jets of the Japanese B.League, he returned to the NBL in 2026 as head coach of the Adelaide 36ers.

== Early life ==
Gleeson grew up in Warrnambool, Victoria, as a member of a sports-mad family with four older siblings. He played football and basketball as a youth. He played for Warrnambool's under 14 team that finished third at the Australian basketball championships. In 1985, he graduated from Emmanuel College.

As an 18-year-old, Gleeson was involved in an industrial accident where a hydraulic door crushed his back. He subsequently spent six weeks in hospital. In the aftermath of the injury, Gleeson pursued a coaching career.

== Coaching career ==
=== Early years in Australia (1990–2000) ===
In 1990, Gleeson was appointed head coach of the Warrnambool Mermaids in the Country Victorian Invitational Basketball League (CVIBL). He guided the Mermaids to the CVIBL Division Two championship in his first year. In 1992, he made the switch to Warrnambool's men's side, the Seahawks, where he was head coach for two years. The Seahawks were CVIBL Division One runners-up in 1992. In 1993, he served as head coach of the Victorian Basketball All Star Team.

Following his stint with the Seahawks, Gleeson moved to Gold Coast, Queensland, to study and coach at Griffith University.

In 1997, Gleeson joined the coaching staff of the Brisbane Bullets in the National Basketball League (NBL) as a development coach. He left the Bullets following the 1999–2000 NBL season.

=== United States and Korea (2000–2006) ===
Gleeson moved to the United States in 2000 and began working at summer basketball camps. He connected with coach Bob Thornton and joined him on his staff at the Quad City Thunder in the Continental Basketball Association (CBA). After one season as an assistant coach with Quad City, Gleeson spent the 2001–02 season as an assistant coach with the Sioux Falls Skyforce. He parted ways with Sioux Falls following the season, but in January 2003, he returned to the Skyforce and took over as head coach for the remainder of the 2002–03 season. He continued on as head coach of the Skyforce for the 2003–04 season.

For the 2004–05 season, Gleeson moved to South Korea to serve as an assistant coach with the Seoul Samsung Thunders of the Korean Basketball League. The 2005–06 season was then spent as an assistant with the Jeonju KCC Egis.

=== Townsville Crocodiles (2006–2011) ===
In 2006, Gleeson returned to Australia and was appointed head coach of the Townsville Crocodiles in the NBL. The Crocodiles finished fifth on the regular season standings in each of his first three seasons, leading to quarter-final losses in 2007 and 2008, and then a semi-final appearance in 2009. The following two seasons saw the Crocodiles rise to a third-place finish in 2009–10 and then a second-place finish in 2010–11; however, both seasons ended in semi-final defeats. He was named NBL Coach of the Year for the 2010–11 season.

Gleeson parted ways with the Crocodiles in 2011 in order to return home to Victoria. His wife was battling breast cancer at the time.

=== Melbourne Tigers (2011–2012) ===
In April 2011, Gleeson was appointed head coach of the Melbourne Tigers in the NBL on a reported three-year deal worth around $150,000 a season. The Tigers started the season with a 5–1 record but went on to miss the playoffs with an 11–17 record.

In June 2012, Gleeson was sacked by the Tigers after weeks of speculation and a club review. New club owner and chief executive Larry Kestelman and new director of basketball Chris Anstey triggered an "investigation" into Gleeson's tenure, with the review revealing nothing other than Gleeson's "style" did not suit them.

=== Stint in the AFL ===
After parting ways with the Tigers, Gleeson remained in Melbourne and worked for a number of months with Australian Football League (AFL) clubs North Melbourne and Hawthorn as a skills coach.

=== Perth Wildcats (2013–2021) ===
==== First championship (2013–14) ====
In June 2013, Gleeson was appointed head coach of the Perth Wildcats in the NBL on a three-year deal. After winning the NBL's preseason tournament, the Wildcats started the 2013–14 regular season with an 8–0 record. He went on to guide the Wildcats to the minor premiership with a 21–7 record, before guiding them through to the NBL Grand Final series, where they defeated the Adelaide 36ers in three games to win the championship.

==== Second championship (2015–16) ====
After a semi-final defeat in 2014–15, the Wildcats finished the 2015–16 regular season in second place with an 18–10 record. They went on to reach the NBL Grand Final series, where they defeated the New Zealand Breakers in three games to win the championship. Gleeson subsequently became the first two-time championship-winning Wildcats coach.

==== Third championship (2016–17) ====
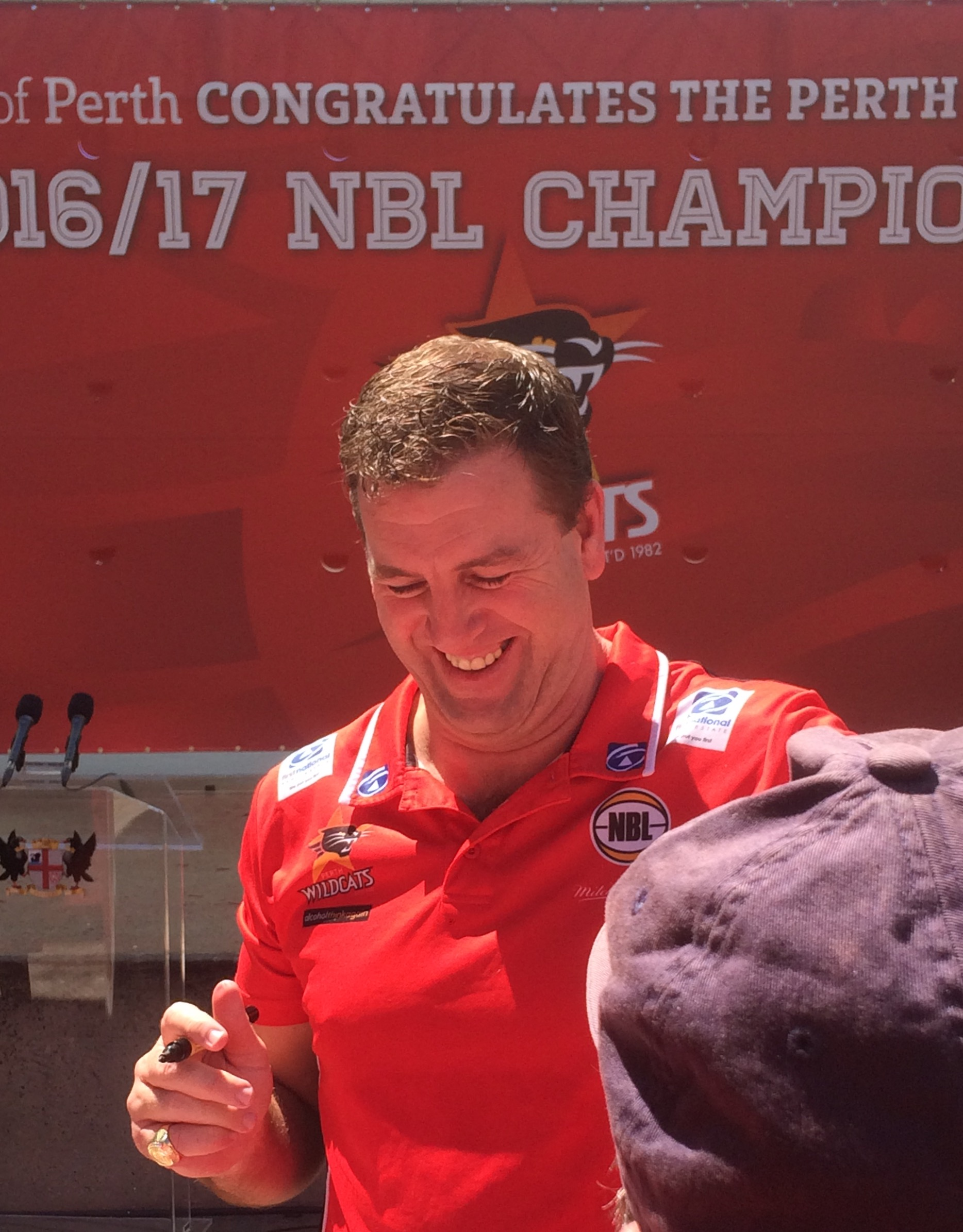
Gleeson in March 2017, after winning his third NBL championship

On 1 May 2016, Gleeson re-signed with the Wildcats on a three-year deal. The Wildcats started the 2016–17 season with a 4–1 record before slumping to the bottom of the ladder in December. The injury toll was a key factor, as was the chemistry balance. With the signing of import guard Bryce Cotton in January, the Wildcats won eight of their remaining twelve regular season games, including two must-win encounters in the final round to squeeze into the playoffs. They went on to go undefeated in the finals, sweeping the Cairns Taipans in the semi-finals and then sweeping the Illawarra Hawks in the grand final series. The Wildcats went back-to-back for the first time since 1990/1991, while Gleeson became the first coach to guide the Wildcats to back-to-back championships.

==== Fourth championship (2018–19) ====
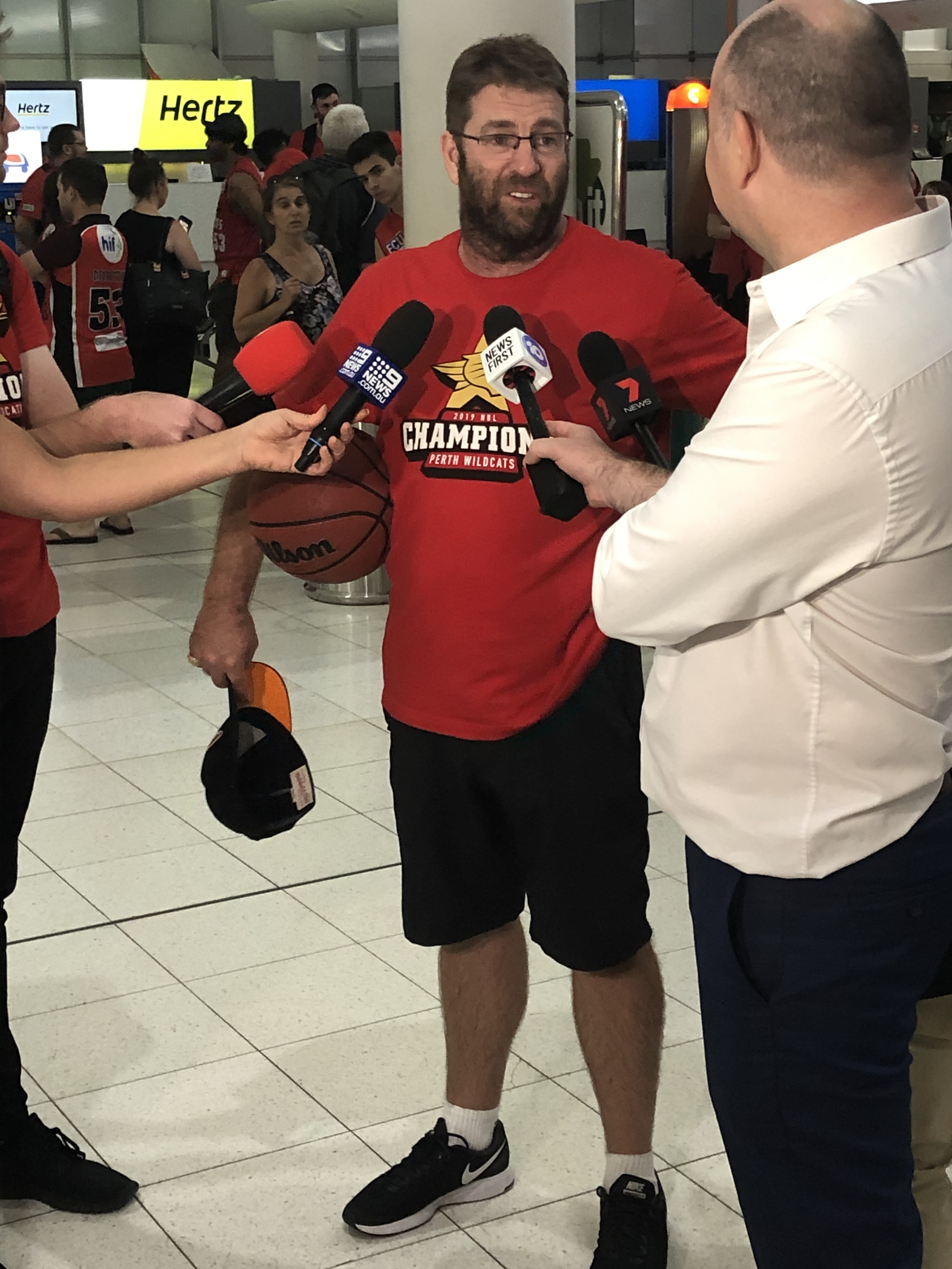
Gleeson in March 2019, after winning his fourth NBL championship

After a semi-final defeat in 2017–18, the Wildcats started the 2018–19 season with a 10–1 record before dropping to 12–9 by mid-January. They went on to win six straight games to lock up the minor premiership before losing the regular-season finale in overtime to Melbourne United, thus finishing with an 18–10 record. Gleeson coached the team to the top of the table despite enormous adversity. Captain Damian Martin (calf), starting centre Angus Brandt (ankle) and back-up guard Mitch Norton (calf) missed large chunks of the season, while imports Bryce Cotton (thumb/hamstring) and Terrico White (hamstring/wrist) also missed games. The Wildcats were under intense external pressure to make changes to their roster, including signing a third import, after going through a slump where they lost eight out of 10 games, but Gleeson refused to budge and the players responded. He guided the Wildcats to a 2–0 win over the Brisbane Bullets in the semi-finals before a 3–1 victory over Melbourne United in the grand final series saw the Wildcats win their ninth championship, with Gleeson winning his fourth title and making history by becoming the first coach in NBL history to win four championships with one team.

==== Fifth championship (2019–20) ====
On 22 March 2019, Gleeson re-signed with the Wildcats for three more seasons. In July 2019, he joined the Indiana Pacers coaching staff for the NBA Summer League.

The Wildcats dropped to an 8–5 record at the conclusion of round 9 of the 2019–20 season. Gleeson and the Wildcats responded with two wins in round 10. In December 2019, Gleeson coached his 400th NBL game, becoming just the eighth coach in NBL history to reach the milestone. After losing back-to-back games to start January 2020, Gleeson and the Wildcats decided to release import Dario Hunt and replace him with seven-year NBA veteran Miles Plumlee. The team went on to win six of the final seven games of the season to finish in second place with a 19–9 record. It marked the Wildcats' best regular-season record since the 21–7 campaign in 2013–14.

After defeating the Taipans 2–1 in the semi-finals, the Wildcats faced the Sydney Kings in the NBL Grand Final. In the grand final series, the Wildcats took Game 1 in Sydney before the Kings levelled the series with a win in Perth. The Wildcats went on to take a 2–1 series lead with a win in Game 3 in Sydney. Due to the coronavirus outbreak, it was decided that Games 2–5 would take place behind closed doors. Following Game 3 however, the Kings refused to take part in the final two games of the series, withdrawing citing health and safety concerns. As a result of a series cancellation and with Perth up 2–1, the NBL declared the Wildcats the champions for the 2019–20 season, with Gleeson thus claiming his fifth NBL championship.

==== Coach of the Year and sixth grand final (2020–21) ====
Due to the COVID-19 pandemic, the 2020–21 NBL season did not commence until January 2021. In February, Gleeson coached the Wildcats for the 231st time, surpassing Alan Black to set a new club record. He also became the winningest coach in Wildcats history with his 146th win. With his 250th career win later that month, he became just the sixth coach in NBL history to reach that milestone, and the third fastest to do it at 424 games. In March, the team won the inaugural NBL Cup with a 7–1 record over the eight Cup games, having been away from Perth for six weeks. Gleeson coached his 250th Wildcats game in April, having won 64.7 per cent of those games. In May, he coached his 450th NBL game and led the Wildcats to a finals berth for the 35th straight year. He was subsequently named NBL Coach of the Year for the second time in his career and first as coach of the Wildcats. He guided the Wildcats to a sixth grand final in eight years with a 2–1 semi-final series victory over the Illawarra Hawks. They went on to lose 3–0 to Melbourne United in the grand final series.

On 12 July 2021, Gleeson requested to be released from the final year of his contract with the Wildcats after receiving an NBA coaching opportunity.

=== Toronto Raptors (2021–2023) ===
On 2 August 2021, Gleeson was appointed an assistant coach of the Toronto Raptors on a three-year contract. His first game as an NBA assistant coach came on 20 October 2021 in the Raptors' 98–83 season-opening loss to the Washington Wizards in Toronto. He started the 2021–22 season as the Raptors' offensive coach but was rotated mid-season to defence by head coach Nick Nurse. He helped the Raptors reach the 2022 NBA playoffs. Gleeson parted ways with the Raptors following the 2022–23 season after coach Nurse was sacked.

Gleeson spoke with multiple NBA teams during the 2023 off-season before they went in different directions. He also declined a job offer in Europe. His Raptors contract was paid out for the 2023–24 season.

=== Milwaukee Bucks (2023–2024) ===
On 27 December 2023, Gleeson was appointed an assistant coach of the Milwaukee Bucks. He was not retained following the 2023–24 season.

=== Chiba Jets (2024–2026) ===
On 24 July 2024, Gleeson was appointed head coach of the Chiba Jets of the Japanese B.League for the 2024–25 season. During pre-season, the Jets played in an exhibition match against the Perth Wildcats during the Wildcats' tour of Japan. Gleeson guided the Jets to 11 consecutive wins heading into the semifinals of the B.League playoffs against the Utsunomiya Brex.

On 28 May 2025, Gleeson was re-appointed head coach of the Jets for the 2025–26 season.

=== Adelaide 36ers (2026–present) ===
On 22 May 2026, Gleeson was appointed head coach of the Adelaide 36ers on a three-year deal, returning to the NBL for the first time since 2021. Joining the 36ers also reunited Gleeson with Bryce Cotton, whom he coached for five seasons at the Perth Wildcats, where they won three championships together. Gleeson missed the 36ers' game against the Tasmania JackJumpers on 16 October 2026 after being granted leave due to a family commitment.

== National team duties ==
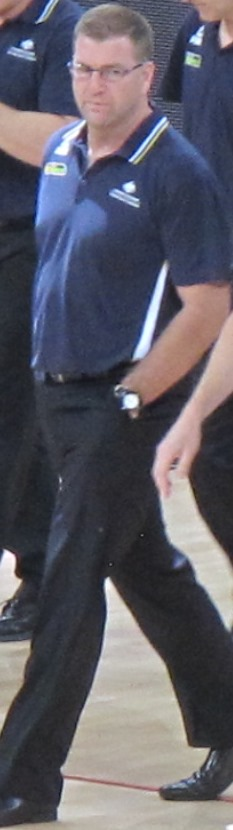
Gleeson with the Boomers in 2014

In June 2014, Gleeson was called up to the Australian Boomers coaching staff for the 2014 FIBA Basketball World Cup. He served as an assistant alongside head coach Andrej Lemanis. He continued on as Lemanis' assistant in 2015 and 2016, as he was a part of the Boomers' 2015 FIBA Oceania Championship triumph as well as their Rio Olympics campaign.

== Personal life ==
Gleeson and his wife Dawn have two children, son Taj and daughter Shae. Gleeson met his wife while in the United States coaching the Sioux Falls Skyforce. While living in Townsville, Dawn was diagnosed with breast cancer. Dawn was cancer free for six years until in 2017 she was informed that her breast cancer had recurred. As of August 2019, she had been cancer free for 20 months.

In May 2016, Gleeson's brother died in tragic circumstances during a family holiday.
