= 2021 NBL Cup =

- League: National Basketball League
- Season: 2020–21
- Duration: 20 February – 14 March 2021
- Games played: 36
- Teams: 9
- TV partners: Australia: SBS Viceland ESPN; New Zealand: Sky Sport; Online: SBS On Demand NBL TV Twitch

Finals
- Champions: Perth Wildcats (1st title)
- Runners-up: S.E. Melbourne Phoenix
- Third place: Brisbane Bullets

Statistical leaders
Points	(United States) Bryce Cotton (Perth)	26.9
Rebounds	(United States) John Mooney (Perth)	12.3
Assists	(Australia) Josh Giddey (Adelaide)	7.4
Efficiency	(Australia) Jack Purchase (Adelaide)	100%

Records
- Highest scoring: 227 points Bullets 108–119 Kings
- Winning streak: 4 games Melbourne United (22 February – 5 March 2021); Perth Wildcats (20 February – 3 March 2021)
- Losing streak: 3 games Adelaide 36ers (25 February – 4 March 2021); Cairns Taipans (22 – 28 February 2021) (6 – 12 March 2021); Melbourne United (7 – 13 March 2021)
- Highest attendance: 4,206 – Day 7; 36ers vs Breakers; United vs Kings
- Lowest attendance: 809 – Day 5 Bullets vs Hawks; Taipans vs Wildcats
- Attendance: 49,659
- Average attendance: 2,759
- All statistics correct as of 19 March 2021.

The 2021 NBL Cup was the first edition of the NBL Cup, organised by the Australian National Basketball League (NBL). The cup was played from 20 February 2021 until 14 March 2021. All 36 games were played at John Cain Arena and the State Basketball Centre in Melbourne, Victoria.

Perth Wildcats won the inaugural NBL Cup trophy with a 7–1 record.

== Venues ==
The tournament was played at two venues in Melbourne.

Melbourne		2021 NBL Cup is located in Australia
John Cain Arena	State Basketball Centre	2021 NBL Cup is located in Australia
Capacity: 10,300	Capacity: 3,200	2021 NBL Cup is located in Australia

== Teams ==
=== Personnel and sponsorship ===
Team	Coach	Captain	Main sponsor	Kit manufacturer
Adelaide 36ers	(United States) Conner Henry	(Australia) Daniel Dillon (Australia) Daniel Johnson (Australia) Brendan Teys	Scouts Australia	Champion
Brisbane Bullets	(Australia) Andrej Lemanis	(Australia) Jason Cadee	St. Genevieve	Champion
Cairns Taipans	(United States) Mike Kelly	(Brazil) Scott Machado	CQUniversity	Champion
Illawarra Hawks	(United States) Brian Goorjian	(Australia) Andrew Ogilvy	Pepper Money	Champion
Melbourne United	(Australia) Dean Vickerman	(Australia) Chris Goulding (Australia) Mitch McCarron	SodaStream	Champion
New Zealand Breakers	(Israel) Dan Shamir	(New Zealand) Thomas Abercrombie	Sky Sport	Champion
Perth Wildcats	(Australia) Trevor Gleeson	(Australia) Jesse Wagstaff	Pentanet	Champion
S.E. Melbourne Phoenix	(Australia) Simon Mitchell	(Australia) Kyle Adnam (Australia) Mitch Creek (Australia) Adam Gibson	Mountain Goat Beer	Champion
Sydney Kings	(Australia) Adam Forde	(Australia) Daniel Kickert (United States) Casper Ware	Brydens Lawyers	Champion

== Games ==
=== Round 1 ===
==== Day 1 ====
20 February 2021	Cairns Taipans	101–95	Illawarra Hawks	John Cain Arena, Melbourne
15:00	Scoring by quarter: 19–18, 21–27, 28–26, 33–24
ESPN	Pts: Machado 31; Rebs: Machado, Oliver 8 Asts: Machado 6	boxscore report	Pts: Harvey 24; Rebs: Froling 12; Asts: Harvey 6	Attendance: 3,711; Referees: Vaughan Mayberry, Mitch Hare, Ruben Woolcock

20 February 2021	Melbourne United	85–89	Perth Wildcats	John Cain Arena, Melbourne
17:30	Scoring by quarter: 20–20, 17–21, 27–24, 21–24
SBS Viceland	Pts: Landale 20; Rebs: Landale 10; Asts: Hopson, Landale 4	boxscore report	Pts: Cotton 29; Rebs: Mooney 9 Asts: Cotton 7	Attendance: 3,711; Referees: Michael Aylen, Nathan Durant, James Griguol

==== Day 2 ====
21 February 2021	South East Melbourne Phoenix	99–83	Brisbane Bullets	John Cain Arena, Melbourne
15:00	Scoring by quarter: 16–27, 28–17, 24–22, 31–17
SBS Viceland	Pts: Creek 29; Rebs: Sykes 10; Asts: Sykes 11	boxscore report	Pts: Hodgson 20; Rebs: Hodgson 9 Asts: Sobey 4	Attendance: 2,566; Referees: Chris Reid, Scott Beker, Travis Stewart

21 February 2021	Sydney Kings	94–77	Adelaide 36ers	John Cain Arena, Melbourne
17:30	Scoring by quarter: 30–22, 18–19, 23–8, 23–18
SBS Viceland	Pts: Ware 23; Rebs: Hunter 9 Asts: Newley 4	boxscore report	Pts: Crocker 15; Rebs: Giddey 7 Asts: Giddey 7	Attendance: 2,566; Referees: Vaughan Mayberry, Damian Lyons, Hugh Starkey

==== Day 3 ====
22 February 2021	Illawarra Hawks	102–88	New Zealand Breakers	John Cain Arena, Melbourne
17:00	Scoring by quarter: 21–21, 33–19, 27–24, 21–24
ESPN	Pts: Harvey 22; Rebs: Froling, Simon 6 Asts: Harvey 4	boxscore report	Pts: C. Webster 22; Rebs: Iverson 17; Asts: C. Webster 7	Attendance: 2,313; Referees: Michael Aylen, Mitch Hare, Daniel Battye

22 February 2021	Melbourne United	88–81	Cairns Taipans	John Cain Arena, Melbourne
19:30	Scoring by quarter: 17–25, 18–17, 23–20, 30–19
ESPN	Pts: Landale 18; Rebs: Landale 11; Asts: McCarron 8	boxscore report	Pts: Noi 27; Rebs: Krslovic 7 Asts: Machado 9	Attendance: 2,313; Referees: Vaughan Mayberry, Damian Lyons, Elliot Green

==== Day 4 ====
23 February 2021	Sydney Kings	106–113	Perth Wildcats	John Cain Arena, Melbourne
17:00	Scoring by quarter: 30–24, 26–30, 17–32, 33–27
ESPN	Pts: Ware 34; Rebs: Ware 5 Asts: Ware 4	boxscore report	Pts: Cotton, Mooney 30; Rebs: Mooney 16; Asts: Cotton 9	Attendance: 1,079; Referees: Simon Beker, Chris Reid, Alex McEwan

23 February 2021	Adelaide 36ers	99–94	South East Melbourne Phoenix	John Cain Arena, Melbourne
19:30	Scoring by quarter: 19–19, 30–29, 30–18, 20–28
ESPN	Pts: Johnson 27; Rebs: Humphries 11; Asts: Giddey 9	boxscore report	Pts: Creek 23; Rebs: Creek 12; Asts: Creek 8	Attendance: 1,079; Referees: Michael Aylen, James Griguol, Ruben Woolcock

=== Round 2 ===
==== Day 5 ====
25 February 2021	Sydney Kings	96–78	New Zealand Breakers	John Cain Arena, Melbourne
17:00	Scoring by quarter: 20–30, 26–6, 22–19, 28–23
ESPN	Pts: Hunter 24; Rebs: Vasiljevic 10; Asts: Ware 5	boxscore report	Pts: C. Webster 24; Rebs: Iverson 6 Asts: T. Webster 5	Attendance: 1,991; Referees: Vaughan Mayberry, James Griguol, Ruben Woolcock

25 February 2021	Adelaide 36ers	73–82	Melbourne United	John Cain Arena, Melbourne
19:30	Scoring by quarter: 8–31, 26–16, 18–17, 21–18
ESPN	Pts: Johnson 14; Rebs: Giddey, Humphries, Johnson 8 Asts: Dech 4	boxscore report	Pts: McCarron 18; Rebs: McCarron 11; Asts: Hopson 4	Attendance: 1,991; Referees: Chris Reid, Damian Lyons, Mitch Hare

==== Day 6 ====
26 February 2021	Brisbane Bullets	97–91	Illawarra Hawks	John Cain Arena, Melbourne
17:00	Scoring by quarter: 27–25, 22–26, 28–20, 20–20
ESPN	Pts: Law 29; Rebs: Law 9 Asts: Cadee, Sobey 6	boxscore report	Pts: Jessup 26; Rebs: Bairstow 8 Asts: Simon 4	Attendance: 809; Referees: Michael Aylen, James Griguol, Travis Stewart

26 February 2021	Cairns Taipans	69–89	Perth Wildcats	John Cain Arena, Melbourne
19:30	Scoring by quarter: 17–25, 24–18, 9–18, 19–28
ESPN	Pts: Oliver 19; Rebs: Oliver 14; Asts: Machado 8	boxscore report	Pts: Cotton 23; Rebs: Mooney 12; Asts: Cotton 8	Attendance: 809; Referees: Scott Beker, Nathan Durant, Daniel Battye

==== Day 7 ====
27 February 2021	Adelaide 36ers	62–106	New Zealand Breakers	John Cain Arena, Melbourne
17:30	Scoring by quarter: 6–32, 24–38, 21–22, 11–24
SBS Viceland	Pts: McVeigh 20; Rebs: Johnson 8 Asts: Johnson 4	boxscore report	Pts: C. Webster, T. Webster 29; Rebs: Iverson 8 Asts: T. Webster 11	Attendance: 4,206; Referees: Vaughan Mayberry, Daniel Battye, Mitch Hare

27 February 2021	Melbourne United	83–80	Sydney Kings	John Cain Arena, Melbourne
20:00	Scoring by quarter: 16–28, 18–15, 24–17, 25–20
ESPN	Pts: Landale 20; Rebs: Lual-Acuil 10; Asts: McCarron 6	boxscore report	Pts: Vasiljevic 22; Rebs: Newley 8 Asts: Ware 5	Attendance: 4,206; Referees: Michael Aylen, Nathan Durant, James Griguol

==== Day 8 ====
28 February 2021	South East Melbourne Phoenix	93–76	Illawarra Hawks	John Cain Arena, Melbourne
14:00	Scoring by quarter: 25–13, 20–24, 28–18, 20–21
SBS Viceland	Pts: Creek 25; Rebs: Creek 6 Asts: Adnam 11	boxscore report	Pts: Harvey 14; Rebs: Adel 7 Asts: Jessup 4	Attendance: 3,195; Referees: Chris Reid, Damian Lyons, Alex McEwan

28 February 2021	Brisbane Bullets	115–99	Cairns Taipans	John Cain Arena, Melbourne
16:30	Scoring by quarter: 25–28, 35–23, 26–22, 29–22
SBS Viceland	Pts: Sobey 30; Rebs: Froling 11; Asts: Cadee 6	boxscore report	Pts: Machado 26; Rebs: Oliver 6 Asts: Scott Machado 6	Attendance: 3,195; Referees: Scott Beker, Mitch Hare, Elliot Green

=== Round 3 ===
==== Day 9 ====
3 March 2021	New Zealand Breakers	97–92	Brisbane Bullets	State Basketball Centre, Melbourne
17:00	Scoring by quarter: 27–12, 20–23, 24–31, 26–26
ESPN	Pts: C. Webster 21; Rebs: T. Webster 9 Asts: C. Webster, T. Webster 4	boxscore report	Pts: Law 19; Rebs: Law 10; Asts: Cadee 6	Attendance: 2,257; Referees: Michael Aylen, Mitch Hare, Ruben Woolcock

3 March 2021	Perth Wildcats	93–92	South East Melbourne Phoenix	State Basketball Centre, Melbourne
19:30	Scoring by quarter: 26–16, 28–22, 20–29, 19–25
ESPN	Pts: Cotton 28; Rebs: Mooney 11; Asts: Norton 8	boxscore report	Pts: Adnam 28; Rebs: Creek 8 Asts: Creek 8	Attendance: 2,257; Referees: Vaughan Mayberry, James Griguol, Hugh Starkey

==== Day 10 ====
4 March 2021	Cairns Taipans	96–92	Sydney Kings	State Basketball Centre, Melbourne
17:00	Scoring by quarter: 26–28, 25–13, 22–26, 23–25
ESPN	Pts: Machado 24; Rebs: Krslovic 10; Asts: Machado 4	boxscore report	Pts: Vasiljevic 32; Rebs: Hunter 6 Asts: Moller, Ware 4	Attendance: 1,355; Referees: Chris Reid, Damian Lyon, Alex McEwan

4 March 2021	Illawarra Hawks	98–89	Adelaide 36ers	State Basketball Centre, Melbourne
19:30	Scoring by quarter: 21–27, 25–21, 26–24, 26–17
ESPN	Pts: Harvey 24; Rebs: Simon 9 Asts: Harvey 6	boxscore report	Pts: Crocker 23; Rebs: Johnson 8 Asts: Giddey 9	Attendance: 1,355; Referees: Simon Beker, Nathan Durant, Daniel Battye

==== Day 11 ====
5 March 2021	Perth Wildcats	92–95	Brisbane Bullets	John Cain Arena, Melbourne
17:00	Scoring by quarter: 22–29, 26–23, 20–21, 24–22
ESPN	Pts: Cotton 29; Rebs: Mooney 9 Asts: Cotton, Jervis, Mooney 4	boxscore report	Pts: Sobey 31; Rebs: Hodgson 9 Asts: Sobey 4	Attendance: 3,421; Referees: Michael Aylen, James Griguol, Elliot Green

5 March 2021	New Zealand Breakers	84–87	Melbourne United	John Cain Arena, Melbourne
19:30	Scoring by quarter: 20–23, 19–16, 19–20, 26–28
ESPN	Pts: T. Webster 32; Rebs: Delany 9 Asts: Delany, C. Webster, T. Webster, Weeks 2	boxscore report	Pts: Landale 23; Rebs: McCarron 7 Asts: McCarron 7	Attendance: 3,421; Referees: Vaughan Mayberry, Nathan Durant, Mitch Hare

==== Day 12 ====
6 March 2021	Adelaide 36ers	81–71	Cairns Taipans	John Cain Arena, Melbourne
17:30	Scoring by quarter: 19–21, 22–17, 18–18, 22–15
SBS Viceland	Pts: Johnson 30; Rebs: Johnson 9 Asts: Giddey 8	boxscore report	Pts: Krslovic 12; Rebs: Machado, Oliver 6 Asts: Machado 7	Attendance: 3,708; Referees: Chris Reid, Ruben Woolcock, Alex McEwan

6 March 2021	South East Melbourne Phoenix	85–91	Sydney Kings	John Cain Arena, Melbourne
20:00	Scoring by quarter: 14–19, 33–24, 18–30, 20–18
ESPN	Pts: Creek 22; Rebs: Creek 9 Asts: Adnam 4	boxscore report	Pts: Vasiljevic 19; Rebs: Ware 10; Asts: Ware 6	Attendance: 3,708; Referees: Simon Beker, James Griguol, Daniel Battye

==== Day 13 ====
7 March 2021	Melbourne United	88–96	Brisbane Bullets	John Cain Arena, Melbourne
14:00	Scoring by quarter: 16–25, 22–22, 29–24, 21–25
SBS Viceland	Pts: Goulding 21; Rebs: Landale 12; Asts: Baba 4	boxscore report	Pts: Hodgson 24; Rebs: Law 15; Asts: Sobey 5	Attendance: 3,696; Referees: Michael Aylen, Damian Lyons, Elliot Green

7 March 2021	Illawarra Hawks	70–87	Perth Wildcats	John Cain Arena, Melbourne
16:30	Scoring by quarter: 17–28, 14–25, 15–21, 24–13
SBS Viceland	Pts: Harvey 17; Rebs: Simon 7 Asts: Simon 3	boxscore report	Pts: Cotton 18; Rebs: Mooney 10; Asts: Norton 6	Attendance: 3,696; Referees: Vaughan Mayberry, Mitch Hare, Daniel Troy

=== Round 4 ===
==== Day 14 ====
10 March 2021	New Zealand Breakers	86–83	Cairns Taipans	John Cain Arena, Melbourne
17:00	Scoring by quarter: 24–11, 22–21, 14–20, 16–21
ESPN	Pts: Abercrombie 20; Rebs: Iverson 11; Asts: T. Webster 4	boxscore report	Pts: Oliver 19; Rebs: Oliver 7 Asts: Machado 4	Attendance: 3,675; Referees: Michael Aylen, Nathan Durant, Travis Stewart

10 March 2021	South East Melbourne Phoenix	97–92(OT)	Melbourne United	John Cain Arena, Melbourne
19:30	Scoring by quarter: 29–24, 21–18, 20–21, 14–21, Overtime: 13–8
ESPN	Pts: Creek 31; Rebs: Creek 10; Asts: Adnam 8	boxscore report	Pts: Goulding, Landale 9 Rebs: Lual-Acuil 9 Asts: Ili, McCarron 5	Attendance: 3,675; Referees: Vaughan Mayberry, Damian Lyons, Daniel Troy

==== Day 15 ====
11 March 2021	Brisbane Bullets	109–104	Adelaide 36ers	John Cain Arena, Melbourne
17:00	Scoring by quarter: 25–29, 31–33, 27–21, 26–21
ESPN	Pts: Sobey 30; Rebs: Hodgson 7 Asts: Law 5	boxscore report	Pts: Johnson 29; Rebs: Johnson 9 Asts: Giddey 11	Attendance: 997; Referees: Scott Beker, James Griguol, Ruben Woolcock

11 March 2021	Sydney Kings	69–89	Illawarra Hawks	John Cain Arena, Melbourne
19:30	Scoring by quarter: 24–24, 20–21, 8–25, 17–19
ESPN	Pts: Vasiljevic 12; Rebs: Moller 6 Asts: Bruce, Moller 4	boxscore report	Pts: Froling 20; Rebs: Bairstow, Froling 6 Asts: Harvey 4	Attendance: 997; Referees: Chris Reid, Nathan Durant, Elliot Green

==== Day 16 ====
12 March 2021	Perth Wildcats	85–75	New Zealand Breakers	John Cain Arena, Melbourne
17:00	Scoring by quarter: 12–19, 23–17, 33–17, 17–22
ESPN	Pts: Cotton 24; Rebs: Mooney 12; Asts: Cotton 7	boxscore report	Pts: Delany 30; Rebs: Iverson 8 Asts: T. Webster 7	Attendance: 2,478; Referees: Vaughan Mayberry, Daniel Battye, James Griguol

12 March 2021	Cairns Taipans	81–85	South East Melbourne Phoenix	John Cain Arena, Melbourne
19:30	Scoring by quarter: 14–20, 22–27, 19–18, 26–20
ESPN	Pts: Machado 24; Rebs: Krslovic 8 Asts: Djeric, Machado 3	boxscore report	Pts: Creek 21; Rebs: Gliddon, Wetzell 8 Asts: Gliddon 5	Attendance: 2,478; Referees: Michael Aylen, Hugh Starkey, Daniel Troy

==== Day 17 ====
13 March 2021	Brisbane Bullets	108–119	Sydney Kings	John Cain Arena, Melbourne
17:30	Scoring by quarter: 24–23, 32–25, 24–38, 28–33
SBS Viceland	Pts: Sobey 35; Rebs: Hodgson, Law 9 Asts: Cadee, Sobey 6	boxscore report	Pts: Ware 25; Rebs: Hunter 8 Asts: Ware 10	Attendance: 4,183; Referees: Scott Beker, Damian Lyons, Ruben Woolcock

13 March 2021	Illawarra Hawks	77–69	Melbourne United	John Cain Arena, Melbourne
20:00	Scoring by quarter: 20–21, 18–22, 18–17, 21–9
ESPN	Pts: Harvey 23; Rebs: Adel, Harvey, Jessup 6 Asts: Harvey 4	boxscore report	Pts: McCarron 16; Rebs: Landale 8 Asts: McCarron 4	Attendance: 4,183; Referees: Chris Reid, Mitch Hare, James Griguol

==== Day 18 ====
14 March 2021	New Zealand Breakers	89–103	South East Melbourne Phoenix	John Cain Arena, Melbourne
14:00	Scoring by quarter: 23–29, 23–24, 19–25, 24–25
ESPN	Pts: Delany 24; Rebs: Iverson 8 Asts: T. Webster 5	boxscore report	Pts: Adnam, Creek 21; Rebs: Moore 5 Asts: Adnam 7	Attendance: 4,019; Referees: Vaughan Mayberry, Damian Lyons, Elliot Green

14 March 2021	Perth Wildcats	97–88	Adelaide 36ers	John Cain Arena, Melbourne
16:30	Scoring by quarter: 15–28, 24–32, 25–8, 33–20
SBS Viceland	Pts: Cotton 34; Rebs: Mooney 16; Asts: Cotton 7	boxscore report	Pts: Paul 25; Rebs: Giddey 8 Asts: Giddey 13	Attendance: 4,019; Referees: Michael Aylen, Daniel Battye, Ruben Woolcock

== Ladder ==
Pos	2021 NBL Cup													
Pos	Team	Pld	W	L	PCT	Last 5	Streak	Home	Away	PF	PA	PP	QW	Pts
1	Perth Wildcats	8	7	1	87.50%	4–1	W3	3–1	4–0	745	680	109.56%	18.5	39.5
2	S.E. Melbourne Phoenix	8	5	3	62.50%	3–2	W3	3–1	2–2	748	704	106.25%	18.5	33.5
3	Brisbane Bullets	8	5	3	62.50%	3–2	L1	5–3	2–2	795	785	101.27%	17.5	32.5
4	Melbourne United	8	4	4	50.00%	2–3	L3	2–2	2–2	674	677	99.56%	17	29
5	Sydney Kings	8	4	4	50.00%	2–3	W1	2–2	2–2	747	729	102.47%	16.5	28.5
6	Illawarra Hawks	8	4	4	50.00%	3–2	W2	3–1	1–3	698	693	100.72%	16.5	28.5
7	New Zealand Breakers	8	3	5	37.50%	2–3	L2	2–2	1–3	703	710	99.01%	13	22
8	Adelaide 36ers	8	2	6	25.00%	1–4	L2	2–2	0–4	673	751	89.61%	14	20
9	Cairns Taipans	8	2	6	25.00%	1–4	L3	2–2	0–4	677	731	92.61%	12.5	18.5

Updated to match(es) played on 14 March 2021. Source: nblcup.com.au
