= Tad Dufelmeier =

Australian basketball player (born 1996)

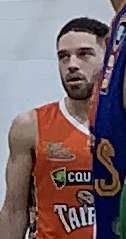
- Dufelmeier with the Cairns Taipans in 2019

Free agent
- Position: Point guard

Personal information
- Born: 9 February 1996 (age 30) Canberra, Australian Capital Territory
- Listed height: 183 cm (6 ft 0 in)
- Listed weight: 79 kg (174 lb)

Career information
- High school: Erindale College (Canberra, Australian Capital Territory)
- College: Salt Lake CC (2014–2016); Concordia (2016–2018)
- NBA draft: 2018: undrafted
- Playing career: 2013–present

Career history
- 2013–2014: Canberra Gunners
- 2019: Hobart Huskies
- 2019: Southern Huskies
- 2019–2021: Cairns Taipans
- 2021: Hobart Chargers
- 2021–2022: Adelaide 36ers
- 2022: Darwin Salties
- 2023: Cairns Marlins
- 2024: Dandenong Rangers
- 2024: Cairns Taipans
- 2025: Chennai Heat
- 2025: Knox Raiders
- 2025: Brisbane Bullets

Career highlights
- All-NBL1 North Second Team (2023); Second-team All-PacWest (2018); NJCAA D1 champion (2016)

Tad Frederick Dufelmeier Jr. (born 9 February 1996) is an Australian professional basketball player who last played for the Brisbane Bullets of the National Basketball League (NBL). He played college basketball in the United States for Salt Lake Community College and Concordia University Irvine.

== Early life ==
Born and raised in Canberra, Australia, Dufelmeier attended Erindale College. He was named to the under-17 Australian National Team and won an Asia-Pacific Games Silver Medal. He also played in the SEABL for the Canberra Gunners in 2013 and 2014.

== College career ==
Dufelmeier played his freshman season as a member of the SLCC Bruins. He averaged 3.7 points and 2.0 rebounds per game. In his sophomore season, he averaged 9.7 points and 3.9 rebounds, starting all the games but one. The Bruins would advance to the national championship game in 2016, winning the school's second title. Dufelmeier was selected to the All-tournament team, and also received the Charles Sesher Sportsmanship Award. Upon completion of his NJCAA eligibility, Dufelmeier signed with NCAA Division II CUI.

In his first season at Concordia, he averaged 11.2 points, 4.4 rebounds, and 3.6 assists per game. His following season saw those numbers rise to 12.1 points, 4.9 rebounds, and 5.5 assists.

== Professional career ==
=== Hobart Huskies and Southern Huskies (2019) ===
In 2019, Dufelmeier played for the Hobart Huskies in the NBL1. In 18 games, he averaged 18.8 points, 6.1 rebounds, 4.9 assists, and 1.9 steals per game. He also had a two-game stint with the Southern Huskies in the New Zealand NBL.

=== Cairns Taipans (2019–2021) ===
For the 2019–20 NBL season, Dufelmeier joined the Cairns Taipans as a development player. He played in five games during the season. He returned to the Taipans in February 2021 as an injury replacement for Majok Deng.

=== Hobart Chargers (2021) ===
Following the 2020–21 NBL season, Dufelmeier joined the Hobart Chargers of the NBL1 South.

=== Adelaide 36ers (2021–2022) ===
On 22 July 2021, Dufelmeier signed with the Adelaide 36ers for the 2021–22 NBL season.

=== Darwin Salties (2022) ===
In 2022, Dufelmeier played for the Darwin Salties in the NBL1 North.

=== Cairns Marlins (2023) ===
In March 2023, Dufelmeier signed with the Cairns Marlins of the NBL1 North. He was named to the All-NBL1 North Second Team.

=== Dandenong Rangers (2024) ===
Dufelmeier played for the Dandenong Rangers of the NBL1 South in the 2024 season.

=== Return to Cairns Taipans (2024) ===
In September 2024, Dufelmeier joined the Cairns Taipans as an injury replacement for Taran Armstrong ahead of the 2024–25 NBL season. He appeared in four regular season games between 21 September and 19 October.

=== Chennai Heat (2025) ===
Dufelmeier joined the Chennai Heat of the Indian National Basketball League (INBL) for the 2025 season.

=== Knox Raiders (2025) ===
Following the INBL season, Dufelmeier joined the Knox Raiders of the NBL1 South for the 2025 NBL1 season. He averaged 13.9 points, 4.1 assists, 7.5 rebounds, and 2.1 steals per game as the Raiders finished in first place on the NBL1 South ladder.

=== Brisbane Bullets (2025) ===
On 25 September 2025, Dufelmeier signed with the Brisbane Bullets as an injury replacement for Mitch Norton. He played his one and only game for the Bullets three days later.

== Personal life ==
Dufelmeier's father, Tad, also played in the NBL for the Canberra Cannons as an American import. He has one brother, Daylan and two sisters, Taqui and Bianca.
