= John Mooney (basketball) =

American basketball player

No. 33 – Anyang Jung Kwan Jang Red Boosters
- Position: Power forward
- League: KBL

Personal information
- Born: March 20, 1998 (age 28) Baltimore, Maryland, U.S.
- Listed height: 6 ft 9 in (2.06 m)
- Listed weight: 245 lb (111 kg)

Career information
- High school: Lake Brantley (Altamonte Springs, Florida)
- College: Notre Dame (2016–2020)
- NBA draft: 2020: undrafted
- Playing career: 2020–present

Career history
- 2020–2021: Perth Wildcats
- 2021–2026: Chiba Jets Funabashi
- 2026–present: Anyang Jung Kwan Jang Red Boosters

Career highlights
- B.League rebounding leader (2024); East Asia Super League Best Five (2024); NBL Cup winner (2021); All-NBL First Team (2021); NBL rebounding leader (2021); First-team All-ACC (2020); Third-team All-ACC (2019)

John Patrick Mooney (born March 20, 1998) is an American professional basketball player for Anyang Jung Kwan Jang Red Boosters of the Korean Basketball League (KBL). He played college basketball for the Notre Dame Fighting Irish.

== Early life and high school career ==
Mooney is the son of Margaret and Kevin Mooney, a builder/contractor for an appliance company who played Division II golf at Spring Hill College. He has two older siblings, Brendan and Caitlin. Mooney began playing for Nike Team Florida in AAU play alongside Florida coach Billy Donovan's son Bryan in eighth grade. Mooney attended Lake Brantley High School. As a senior, he averaged 24.8 points, 14 rebounds and five blocks per game and was named to the first-team all-state.

He initially committed to play under Donovan at Florida but reopened his recruitment after Donovan took the coaching job of the Oklahoma City Thunder. After fielding offers from Indiana, Kansas, Georgia Tech, Georgia, Wake Forest, Alabama, Florida State, Vanderbilt, and Stanford, Mooney's father asked Donovan his opinion on Notre Dame. Donovan telephoned Notre Dame coach Mike Brey and informed him about Mooney, and Brey sent his brother to scout the prospect. Mooney committed to the Fighting Irish after taking his official visit.

== College career ==
As a freshman, Mooney served as a backup to Bonzie Colson. Mooney averaged 5.6 points, 3.9 rebounds and 0.5 assists per game in his sophomore season. As a junior, Mooney was named to the Third Team All-ACC and finished second to Jordan Nwora as the league most improved player. He averaged 14.1 points and 11.2 rebounds per game, though the Fighting Irish finished 14–19 and were last in the ACC. Mooney registered 15 double-doubles in ACC play, including eight straight from January 2 to February 5, 2019.

Coming into his senior season, Mooney was named to the Preseason All-ACC team and received three votes for Preseason Player of the Year. After scoring 28 points and grabbing 16 rebounds in a win against Howard, Mooney was named ACC player of the week on November 18, 2019. On January 4, 2020, Mooney tied his career-high with 28 points and had 14 rebounds in an 88–87 win versus Syracuse. As a result, Mooney earned his second ACC player of the week honors on January 6. He had his 12th consecutive double-double with 21 points and 13 rebounds in a loss to Syracuse on January 22, breaking Luke Harangody's school record of consecutive double-doubles. At the conclusion of the regular season, Mooney was selected to the First Team All-ACC. He averaged 16.2 points and 12.7 rebounds per game as a senior.

== Professional career ==
=== Perth Wildcats (2020–2021) ===
On August 14, 2020, Mooney signed a one-year deal with the Perth Wildcats of the Australian National Basketball League (NBL). In the Wildcats' season opener on January 24, 2021, he recorded 13 points and 14 rebounds in an 88–76 win over the South East Melbourne Phoenix. He set a record for rebounds by a Wildcat playing in his first NBL game. For the season, he averaged a double-double, becoming the first Wildcat to do that since 2007, and finished the season with 27 double-doubles in 42 games – the second most in a season by a Wildcat. His 11.4 rebounds per game is the eighth highest in club history and his total of 480 rebounds is the third-most in a single season in NBL history. He helped the Wildcats reach the 2021 NBL Grand Final series, where they lost 3–0 to Melbourne United. He was subsequently named the Wildcats Club MVP.

=== Chiba Jets (2021–2026) ===
On July 15, 2021, Mooney signed with Chiba Jets Funabashi of the Japanese B.League. He re-signed with Chiba on May 27, 2022, and again on June 12, 2023, May 31, 2024, and May 29, 2025.

== Career statistics ==
Legend
GP	Games played	GS	Games started	MPG	Minutes per game
FG%	Field goal percentage	3P%	3-point field goal percentage	FT%	Free throw percentage
RPG	Rebounds per game	APG	Assists per game	SPG	Steals per game
BPG	Blocks per game	PPG	Points per game	**Bold**	Career high

=== College ===
Year	Team	GP	GS	MPG	FG%	3P%	FT%	RPG	APG	SPG	BPG	PPG
2016–17	Notre Dame	12	0	3.8	**.625**	**.500**	**1.000**	1.6	.2	.1	.1	1.2
2017–18	Notre Dame	**36**	7	15.4	.480	.419	.531	3.9	.5	.3	.4	5.6
2018–19	Notre Dame	33	**33**	29.6	.455	.374	.769	11.2	1.3	.9	**.8**	14.1
2019–20	Notre Dame	31	31	**32.7**	.460	.295	.635	**12.7**	**1.7**	**1.3**	.7	**16.2**
Career		112	71	23.1	.462	.358	.675	8.2	1.0	.7	.6	10.5

== Personal life ==
On August 2, 2025, Mooney married Cristina.

== See also ==
- List of All-Atlantic Coast Conference men's basketball teams
