= Scott Machado =

American-Brazilian basketball player (born 1990)

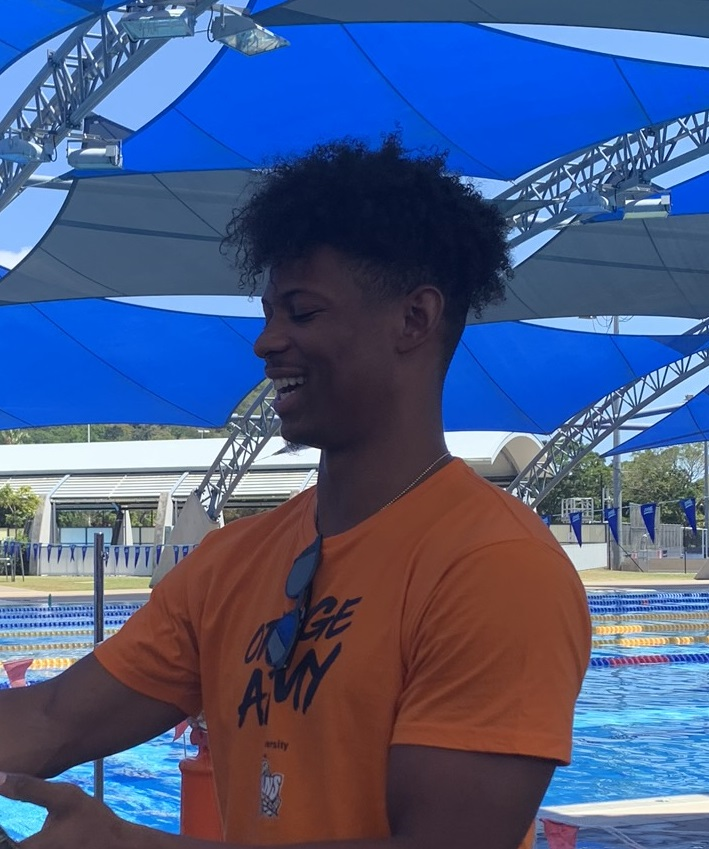
- Machado with the Cairns Taipans in 2019

No. 3 – Minas
- Position: Point guard
- League: NBB

Personal information
- Born: June 8, 1990 (age 36) Queens, New York, U.S.
- Listed height: 185 cm (6 ft 1 in)
- Listed weight: 93 kg (205 lb)

Career information
- High school: St. Mary's (Manhasset, New York); Saint Benedict's Prep (Newark, New Jersey)
- College: Iona (2008–2012)
- NBA draft: 2012: undrafted
- Playing career: 2012–present

Career history
- 2012–2013: Houston Rockets
- 2012–2013: →Rio Grande Valley Vipers
- 2013: Santa Cruz Warriors
- 2013: Golden State Warriors
- 2013–2014: →Santa Cruz Warriors
- 2014: Idaho Stampede
- 2014: ASVEL Basket
- 2014–2015: BC Kalev
- 2015–2016: EWE Baskets Oldenburg
- 2016: Rasta Vechta
- 2016–2017: ICL Manresa
- 2017–2019: South Bay Lakers
- 2019: Los Angeles Lakers
- 2019–2022: Cairns Taipans
- 2021: Mandurah Magic
- 2022: Hapoel Eilat
- 2022–2023: Avtodor Saratov
- 2023–2024: Flamengo
- 2024–present: Minas

Career highlights
- NBL Fans MVP (2020); All-NBL First Team (2020); NBA D-League All-Rookie First Team (2013); All-NBL1 West First Team (2021); NBL1 West Golden Hands (2021); NCAA assists leader (2012); Haggerty Award (2012); MAAC Player of the Year (2012); 2× First-team All-MAAC (2011, 2012); Second-team All-MAAC (2010); MAAC Rookie of the Year (2009); MAAC All-Rookie Team (2009)
- Stats at NBA.com
- Stats at Basketball Reference

Michael Scott Porto Machado (born June 8, 1990) is an American-Brazilian professional basketball player for Minas Clube of Novo Basquete Brasil (NBB). He played college basketball for the Iona Gaels and represents the Brazilian national team.

== High school career ==
Machado played for three years at St. Mary's High School in Manhasset, New York, where he was teammates with future NBA player Danny Green. He transferred to Saint Benedict's Preparatory School for his senior year, where he played for Hall of Fame coach Bob Hurley's son, Danny.

== College career ==
As a freshman at Iona, Machado led the Gaels in points scored (288, a 9.2 per game average), set a school record for assists by a freshman (150) and was named the Metro Atlantic Athletic Conference rookie of the year. As a sophomore, he averaged 12.5 points and 3.9 assists, leading the Gaels to a 21-win season. He was selected second team All-Conference. As a junior, Machado broke out, averaging 13.2 points and 7.6 assists per game (second in the nation). He set a school record for assists in a season (281) and was named first team all-conference.

As a senior, Machado broke the school record for assists in the first game of the season and broke Siena's Ronald Moore's MAAC record in a February 18 game against Nevada. After emerging as one of the top point guards in the country, he was named a finalist for the Bob Cousy Award and the Wooden Award.

== Professional career ==
=== 2012–13 season ===
After going undrafted in the 2012 NBA draft, Machado joined the Houston Rockets for the 2012 NBA Summer League. In five games, he averaged 8.0 points, 5.6 assists and 2.2 rebounds per game. On September 7, 2012, he signed with the Rockets.

On November 14, 2012, Machado was assigned to the Rio Grande Valley Vipers of the NBA Development League. On November 26, 2012, he was recalled by the Rockets. Two days later, he made his NBA debut with the Rockets, recording two points and one assist in a 98–120 loss to the Oklahoma City Thunder. On November 30, 2012, he was reassigned to the Vipers. On December 22, 2012, he was recalled by the Rockets. On January 7, 2013, he was waived by the Rockets.

On January 29, 2013, Machado was acquired by the Vipers. On March 8, 2013, he was traded to the Santa Cruz Warriors in exchange for Chris Daniels and a second-round draft pick.

On April 7, 2013, Machado signed a 10-day contract with the Golden State Warriors. The next day, he was assigned back to Santa Cruz. On April 17, 2013, he signed with Golden State for the rest of the season. Machado stayed with the Santa Cruz Warriors for the team's D-League playoff run until Santa Cruz lost the best-of-three 2013 NBA D-League Finals series to the Rio Grande Valley Vipers on April 26. Two days later, he returned to Golden State and made his debut in Game 4 of the Warriors' first-round series against the Denver Nuggets, recording two points and one rebound in the Warriors' 115–101 victory.

=== 2013–14 season ===
In July 2013, Machado joined the Golden State Warriors for the 2013 NBA Summer League. On July 24, 2013, he was waived by the Warriors.

On September 26, 2013, he signed with the Utah Jazz. However, he was later waived by the Jazz on October 26, 2013. On January 14, 2014, he was re-acquired by the Santa Cruz Warriors. On February 26, 2014, he was traded to the Idaho Stampede.

On April 7, 2014, he signed with ASVEL Basket of France for the rest of the 2013–14 LNB Pro A season.

=== 2014–15 season ===
In July 2014, Machado joined the Toronto Raptors for the 2014 NBA Summer League. On September 3, 2014, he signed with BC Kalev/Cramo of Estonia for the 2014–15 season.

=== 2015–16 season ===
On July 24, 2015, Machado signed with EWE Baskets Oldenburg of Germany for the 2015–16 season.

=== 2016–17 season ===
On August 7, 2016, Machado signed with Rasta Vechta of Germany for the 2016–17 season. On December 5, 2016, he parted ways with Vechta. Eight days later, he signed with Spanish club ICL Manresa for the rest of the 2016–17 ACB season. In its second game in Spain, its first at home, Machado scored a winning layup against Movistar Estudiantes.

=== 2017–18 season ===
In October 2017, Machado joined the South Bay Lakers of the NBA G League. In 46 games (22 starts), he averaged 15.9 points (.450 FG%, .405 3P%), 8.7 assists, 3.8 rebounds and 1.0 steals in 31.4 minutes per game.

=== 2018–19 season ===
On October 12, 2018, Machado signed with the Los Angeles Lakers, but was waived a day later. He subsequently signed with the Lakers' G League affiliate, the South Bay Lakers. On March 21, 2019, Machado signed a 10-day contract with the Los Angeles Lakers. He had a career high 7 points and 3 assists on March 27 against the Utah Jazz.

=== 2019–20 season ===
On August 9, 2019, Machado signed with the Cairns Taipans in Australia for the 2019–20 NBL season. He finished the season with averages of 16.6 points, 7.7 assists and 3.9 rebounds across his 31 games. He narrowly missed out on being named NBL MVP but was named the Fan's MVP and Taipans Club MVP. He was also named to the All-NBL First Team.

=== 2020–21 season ===
On November 22, 2020, Machado re-signed with the Cairns Taipans on a two-year deal. In the 2020–21 NBL season, he averaged 15.8 points, 3.6 rebounds and 7.0 assists in 34 games.

On June 12, 2021, Machado signed with the Mandurah Magic in Western Australia for the rest of the 2021 NBL1 West season. In 12 games, he averaged 21.41 points, 6.16 rebounds, 7.33 assists and 2.75 steals per game. He was named to the All-NBL1 West First Team.

=== 2021–22 season ===
Machado sustained a heel injury in round two of the 2021–22 NBL season. He missed more than six weeks with the injury. In April 2022, he re-injured his heel and missed the rest of the season. He parted ways with the Taipans in June 2022.

=== 2022–23 season ===
On June 11, 2022, Machado signed with Hapoel Eilat of the Israeli Basketball Premier League.

On December 7, 2022, he signed with Avtodor Saratov of the VTB United League.

== National team career ==
In 2018, Machado debuted for the Brazilian national team during the FIBA World Cup Americas qualifiers. He averaged 8.3 points, 3.3 rebounds and 3.5 assists in four games.

== Career statistics ==
Legend
GP	Games played	GS	Games started	MPG	Minutes per game
FG%	Field goal percentage	3P%	3-point field goal percentage	FT%	Free throw percentage
RPG	Rebounds per game	APG	Assists per game	SPG	Steals per game
BPG	Blocks per game	PPG	Points per game	**Bold**	Career high

=== NBA ===
==== Regular season ====
Year	Team	GP	GS	MPG	FG%	3P%	FT%	RPG	APG	SPG	BPG	PPG
2012–13	Houston	**6**	0	3.5	.500	.000	**1.000**	**.2**	**1.0**	**.3**	.0	1.3
2018–19	LA Lakers	4	0	**4.8**	**.667**	**1.000**	**1.000**	.0	.8	**.3**	.0	**2.5**
Career		10	0	4.0	.583	.500	1.000	.1	.9	.3	.0	1.8

==== Playoffs ====
Year	Team	GP	GS	MPG	FG%	3P%	FT%	RPG	APG	SPG	BPG	PPG
2013	Golden State	5	0	1.6	.500	–	.500	.2	.2	.0	.0	.6

== Personal life ==
Machado is the son of Brazilian parents Luiz and Solenir Machado. As a child, Machado started referring to himself by his middle name "Scott" instead of his birth name "Michael" after his childhood favorite team, the New York Knicks, were constantly beaten in the playoffs by Michael Jordan and the Chicago Bulls.

== See also ==
- List of NCAA Division I men's basketball career assists leaders
- List of NCAA Division I men's basketball season assists leaders
