= NBL Cup =

In-season competition

- Most recent season or competition: 2021 NBL Cup
- Sport: Basketball
- Founded: 21 December 2020; 5 years ago
- Organising body: National Basketball League
- No. of teams: 10
- Countries: Australia (9 teams); New Zealand (1 team)
- Continent: FIBA Oceania (Oceania)
- Most recent champions: Perth Wildcats (1st title)
- Most titles: Perth Wildcats (1 title)
- Sponsor: Hungry Jack's
- Website: NBLCup.com.au

The National Basketball League Cup, often shortened to the NBL Cup, was a midseason tournament for the Australian National Basketball League (NBL) played during the 2020–21 season. The tournament was discontinued after one season.

== History ==
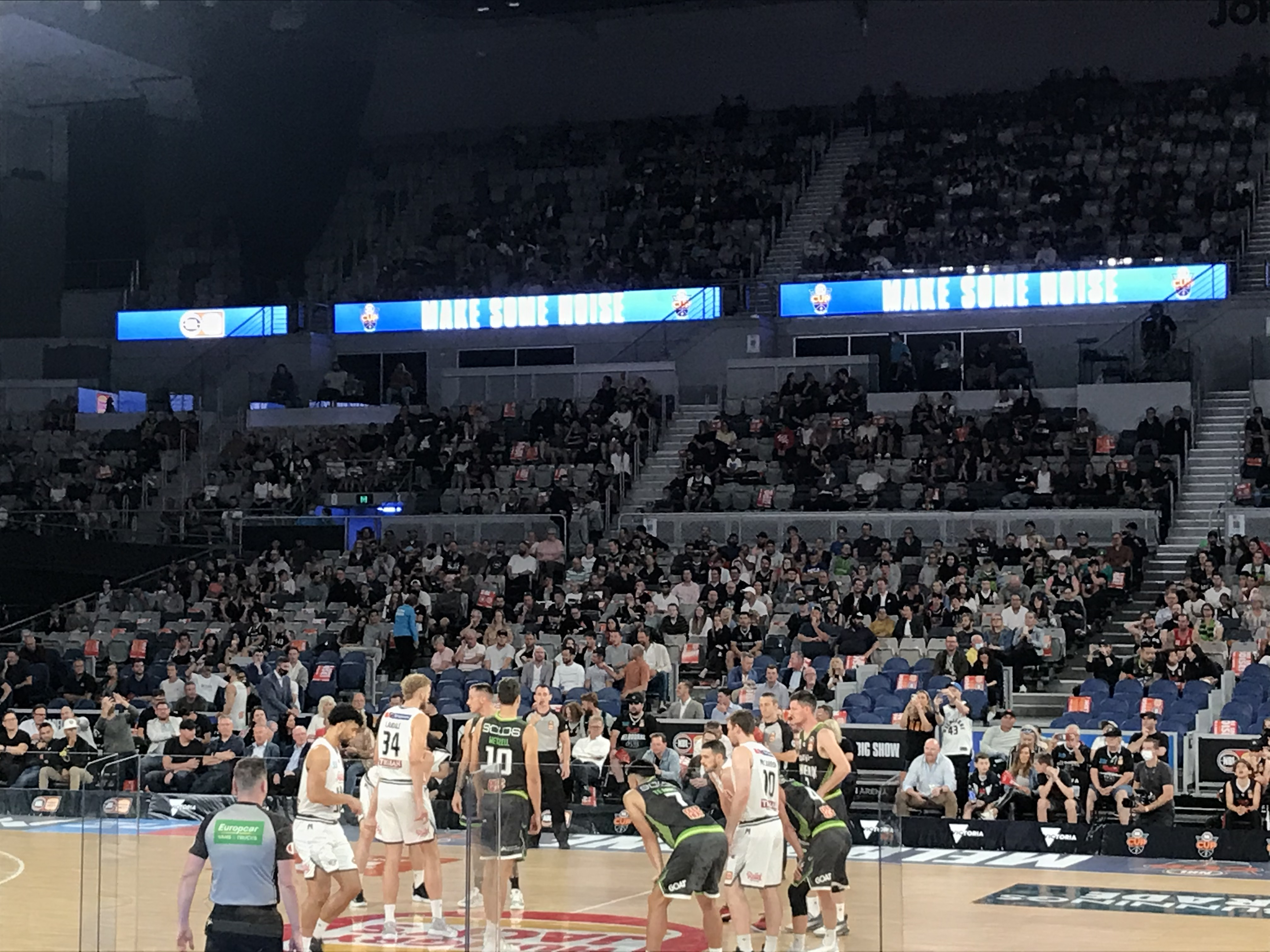
South East Melbourne Phoenix and Melbourne United at John Cain Arena

On 21 December 2020, the Australian National Basketball League established the first NBL Cup to be held in Melbourne, Victoria, with all nine NBL teams taking part in the tournament from 20 February to 14 March. The majority of the 36 games were scheduled to be played at John Cain Arena (formerly Melbourne Arena), with a small amount scheduled for the State Basketball Centre in Wantirna South, Melbourne. All nine NBL teams moved to Melbourne for the 2021 NBL Cup.

The 36 games counted towards the 2020–21 NBL season and, in a first for the league, would also decide the winner of the inaugural NBL Cup with total prize money of $300,000. Every team played each other once; the team with the most points at the end of the 36 games was awarded the NBL Cup and $150,000 in prize money. The runner-up received $100,000 and third place received $50,000. The ladders included three points for a win, one point for each quarter won, and half a point for tied quarters.

On 14 March 2021, the Perth Wildcats won the inaugural NBL Cup with a 7–1 record in eight games played. Bryce Cotton led all scorers with 26.9 points and teammate John Mooney led all rebounds with 12.3 per game. Adelaide 36ers rookie Josh Giddey led all assists with 7.4 per game.

At the completion of the NBL Melbourne Hub, teams returned to regular home-and-away schedules. The NBL Cup was not continued in the 2021–22 season.

In May 2023, the league raised the potential for a return of a cup tournament in the future. A mid-season tournament was raised again by the league in May 2025 following the success of the NBA Cup, which would later become the NBL Ignite Cup.

== Finals ==
Year	Winner	Record	Runners-up	Third place	Venue(s)	Location	Top scorer
NBL Cup
2021	Perth Wildcats	7–1	S.E. Melbourne Phoenix	Brisbane Bullets	John Cain Arena	Melbourne, Victoria	(United States) Bryce Cotton (26.9)
2021	Perth Wildcats	7–1	S.E. Melbourne Phoenix	Brisbane Bullets	State Basketball Centre	Melbourne, Victoria	(United States) Bryce Cotton (26.9)

== Titles by team ==
Titles by team
Team	Wins	Winning seasons	Runners-up	Third place
Perth Wildcats	1	2021	—	—
S.E. Melbourne Phoenix	0	—	2021	—
Brisbane Bullets	0	—	—	2021

== See also ==
- Basketball in Australia
- Basketball in New Zealand
- National Basketball League
- NBL Finals
- NBL Ignite Cup
