= Mitch Norton =

Australian basketball player (born 1993)

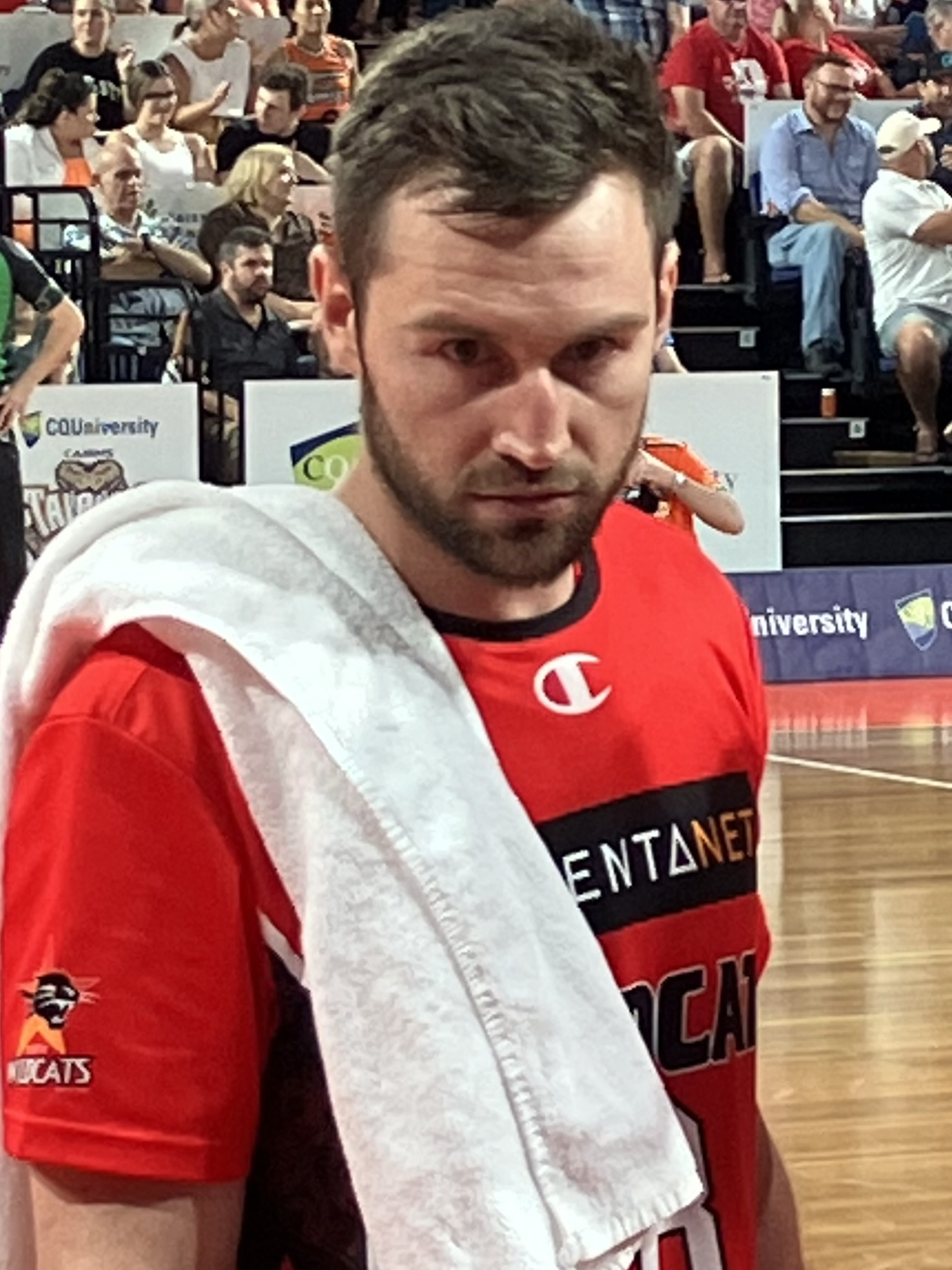
- Norton with the Perth Wildcats in 2022

No. 8 – Brisbane Bullets
- Position: Point guard
- League: NBL

Personal information
- Born: 1 April 1993 (age 33) Townsville, Queensland, Australia
- Listed height: 184 cm (6 ft 0 in)
- Listed weight: 90 kg (198 lb)

Career information
- High school: Pimlico State (Townsville, Queensland)
- Playing career: 2011–present

Career history
- 2011–2016: Townsville Crocodiles
- 2012–2015: Townsville Heat
- 2016–2017: Southland Sharks
- 2016–2018: Illawarra Hawks
- 2018–2023: Perth Wildcats
- 2023–present: Brisbane Bullets
- 2024: Southern Districts Spartans

Career highlights
- 2× NBL champion (2019, 2020); NBL Cup winner (2021); QBL U23 Youth Player of the Year (2015)
Medals
Men's basketball
Representing Australia
Commonwealth Games
Gold medal – first place	2018 Gold Coast	Team competition
FIBA Asia Cup
Gold medal – first place	2017 Lebanon

Mitchell Robert Norton (born 1 April 1993) is an Australian professional basketball player for the Brisbane Bullets of the National Basketball League (NBL). He began his NBL career in 2011 with the Townsville Crocodiles before joining the Illawarra Hawks in 2016 following the collapse of his hometown team. After two seasons with the Hawks, he joined the Perth Wildcats and won two NBL championships in five seasons. He has also played for the Townsville Heat in the Queensland Basketball League and the Southland Sharks in the New Zealand NBL.

== Early life and junior career ==
Norton was born in Townsville, Queensland, in the former local government area of Thuringowa. He attended Currajong State School and Pimlico State High School. He played junior basketball for Blackstars Basketball Club.

Norton represented Queensland North at the Australian Under 16 Championships in 2007 and 2008, and the Under 18 Championships in 2009. In 2010, he was selected for Australia to compete at the FIBA Under-17 World Championship, averaging 11.3 points per game. Norton again suited up for Queensland in 2010 for the Australian Under 20 Championships, and again in 2011 where Queensland collected a silver medal. In 2011, he was selected for the Australian Institute of Sport (AIS) touring team after securing a scholarship at the AIS, and travelled to Latvia for the FIBA Under-19 World Championship, but was forced to miss the tournament after sustaining a broken foot.

== Professional career ==
=== Australian NBL ===
==== Townsville Crocodiles (2011–2016) ====
Norton made his debut in the National Basketball League (NBL) for the Townsville Crocodiles during the 2011–12 season. A foot injury limited him to five games. In his second season in 2012–13, Norton appeared in all 28 games for the Crocodiles.

For the 2013–14 season, Norton was named the Crocodiles' Defensive Player of the Year and earned the Players' Player award. He earned the Players' Player award again in 2014–15.

In November 2015, Norton played his 100th NBL game.

==== Illawarra Hawks (2016–2018) ====
As a result of the demise of the Townsville Crocodiles following the 2015–16 season, Norton signed a two-year deal with the Illawarra Hawks in April 2016. He helped the Hawks reach the 2017 NBL Grand Final series, where they lost 3–0 to the Perth Wildcats. He missed six weeks during the 2017–18 season after undergoing surgery on a fractured thumb.

==== Perth Wildcats (2018–2023) ====
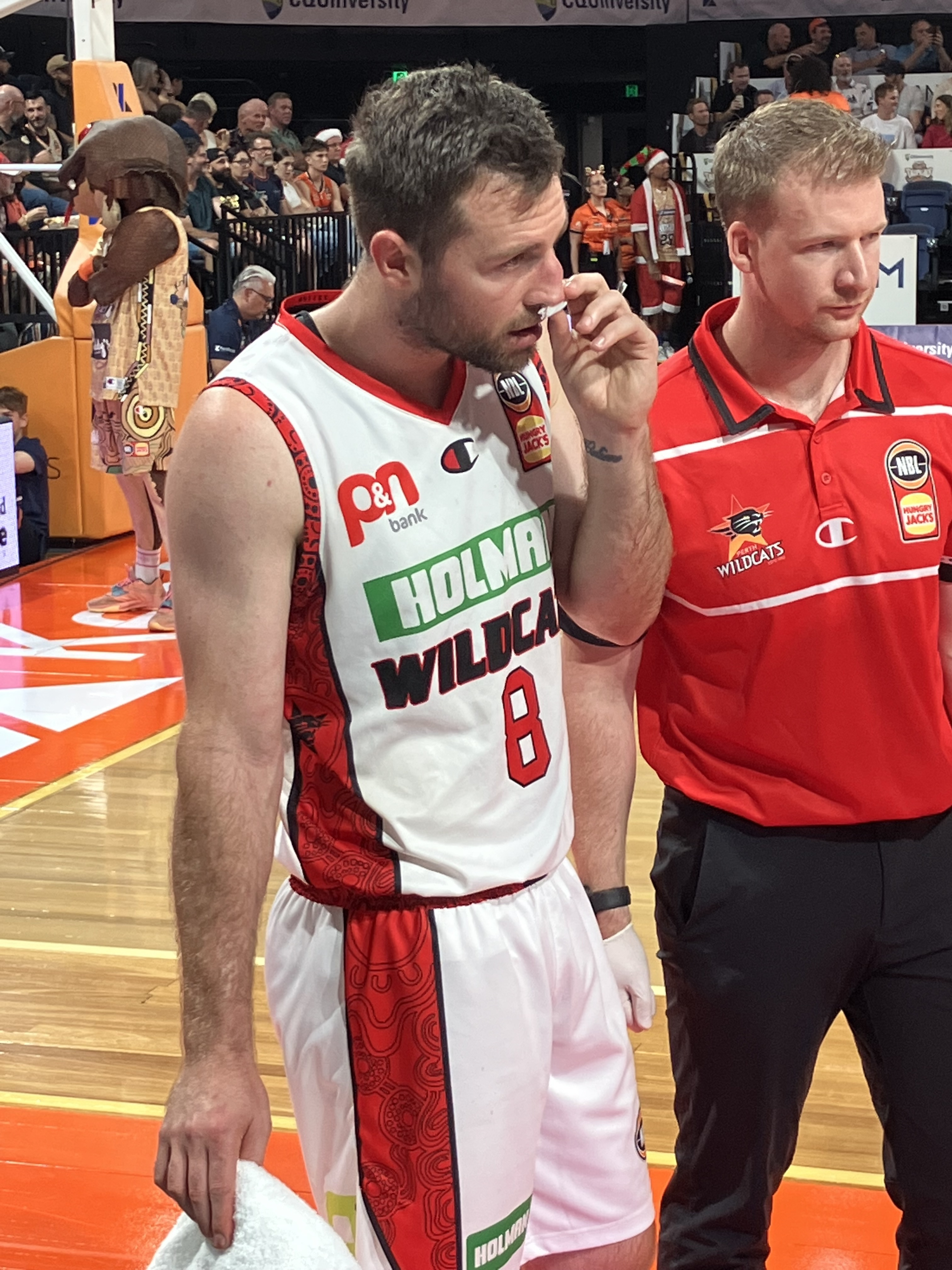
Norton with the Wildcats in December 2022

On 23 April 2018, Norton signed a three-year deal with the Perth Wildcats. On 28 January 2019, he was ruled out for the rest of the 2018–19 regular season with a tear to his left calf muscle. In March 2019, he was a member of the Wildcats' championship-winning team. In March 2020, he was crowned an NBL champion for the second straight year.

Following the retirement of Damian Martin, Norton moved into the starting point guard position for the Wildcats in 2020–21, resulting in a career-best year. He averaged 8.3 points, 3.7 rebounds, and 3.9 assists per game. In April 2021, he played his 250th NBL game. Norton was inspirational during the NBL finals as the Wildcats finished runners-up, refusing to allow a hip injury to stop him from playing despite being in obvious pain. For the season, he was a finalist for the NBL Best Defensive Player Award.

On 1 July 2021, Norton re-signed with the Wildcats on a three-year deal. He was ruled out for the first month of the 2021–22 NBL season with a knee injury. On 10 March 2022, he scored a career-high 26 points in a 97–87 win over Melbourne United. Later that month, he was ruled out for two to three weeks with a low grade hamstring strain.

In the 2022–23 NBL season, Norton saw his minutes reduce significantly under new coach John Rillie. In the Wildcats' play-in qualifier, he played a crucial defensive role off the bench in a win over the South East Melbourne Phoenix.

On 14 April 2023, Norton parted ways with the Wildcats.

==== Brisbane Bullets (2023–present) ====
On 19 April 2023, Norton signed a two-year deal with the Brisbane Bullets.

On 10 April 2024, Norton extended his contract with the Bullets until the end of the 2026–27 season. He was named team captain for the 2024–25 NBL season. In November 2024, he played his 350th NBL game.

Norton continued as team captain for the 2025–26 NBL season. On 25 September 2025, he was ruled out for eight weeks after sustaining a knee injury against the New Zealand Breakers in the Bullets' season opener. He made his return from injury in round eight.

In October 2026, Norton played his 400th NBL game, becoming just the 54th person in NBL history to play 400 games.

=== QBL, New Zealand NBL, and NBL1 North ===
Norton played for the Townsville Heat in the Queensland Basketball League (QBL) every year between 2012 and 2015, where he won the QBL U23 Youth Player of the Year award in 2015.

In 2016, Norton moved to New Zealand to play for the Southland Sharks in the New Zealand NBL. He returned to the Sharks for the 2017 season.

Norton joined the Southern Districts Spartans of the NBL1 North for the 2024 season.

== National team career ==
In July 2012, Norton helped Australia earn the silver medal at the Stanković Cup in China.

In June 2013, Norton was named in the Australian squad for the Stanković Cup and World University Games. Australia went on to win gold and silver respectively.

Norton won gold with the Australian national team at the 2017 FIBA Asia Cup in Lebanon and the 2018 Commonwealth Games on the Gold Coast.

In February 2021, Norton was named in the Boomers' Olympic squad.

In August 2022, Norton was named in the Boomers' World Cup Qualifiers team. He re-joined the team for the next qualifying window in February 2023.

In November 2024, Norton joined the Boomers for the 2025 FIBA Asia Cup qualifiers. He re-joined the squad in February 2025 for two more qualifiers. In April 2025, he was named in the Boomers squad for a trans-Tasman series against New Zealand in May.

== Personal life ==
Norton is the son of Paul and Anita Norton, and has a younger brother named Max. While playing for the Townsville Crocodiles, Norton was studying a business degree at James Cook University.

Norton and his partner Sascha had their first child in 2024.
