= Josh Giddey =

Australian basketball player (born 2002)

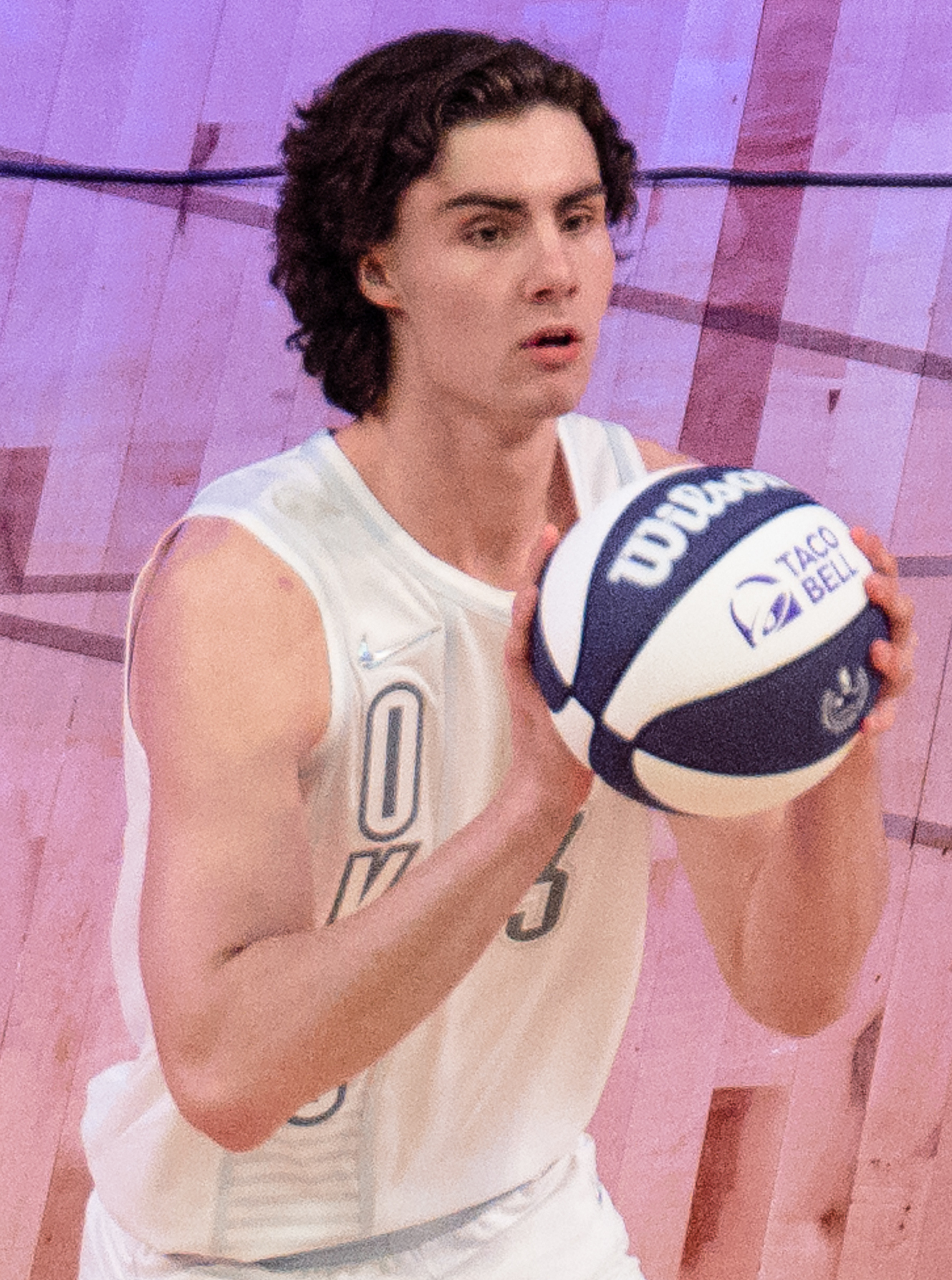
- Giddey in the 2022 NBA All-Star Skills Challenge

No. 3 – Chicago Bulls
- Position: Point guard / shooting guard
- League: NBA

Personal information
- Born: 10 October 2002 (age 24) Melbourne, Victoria, Australia
- Listed height: 6 ft 8 in (2.03 m)
- Listed weight: 214 lb (97 kg)

Career information
- High school: St Kevin's College (Melbourne, Victoria); Lake Ginninderra (Canberra, Australian Capital Territory)
- NBA draft: 2021: 1st round, 6th overall pick
- Drafted by: Oklahoma City Thunder
- Playing career: 2020–present

Career history
- 2020–2021: Adelaide 36ers
- 2021–2024: Oklahoma City Thunder
- 2024–present: Chicago Bulls

Career highlights
- NBA All-Rookie Second Team (2022); NBL Rookie of the Year (2021); Gaze Medal (2023)
- Stats at NBA.com
- Stats at Basketball Reference
Medals
Men's basketball
Representing Australia
FIBA Oceania Under-17 Championship
Gold medal – first place	2019 New Caledonia	Team

Joshua James Giddey (born 10 October 2002) is an Australian professional basketball player for the Chicago Bulls of the National Basketball Association (NBA). He was selected by the Oklahoma City Thunder with the sixth overall pick in the 2021 NBA draft. Giddey is the youngest player in NBA history to record a triple-double, having done so at 19 years, 84 days old. He also became the first rookie since Hall of Famer Oscar Robertson in 1961 to record three consecutive triple-doubles.

== Early life and career ==
Giddey was born on October 10, 2002, in Melbourne, Victoria, Australia, to professional basketball players Kim and Warrick Giddey. Warrick made the Australian Schoolboys teams in both Rugby league and Rugby union before playing for the Illawarra Hawks and Melbourne Tigers in the National Basketball League (NBL), while Kim played for the Melbourne Tigers women’s basketball team in the Women's National Basketball League (WNBL). Giddey grew up supporting Hawthorn Football Club whilst living in Yarraville and attended St Kevin's College in Toorak from Years 7 to 10, before emerging as one of Australia's top basketball prospects with the NBA Global Academy, a training center part of the BA Centre of Excellence at the Australian Institute of Sport (AIS) in Canberra. He attended UC Senior Secondary College Lake Ginninderra alongside his full-time training at the AIS.

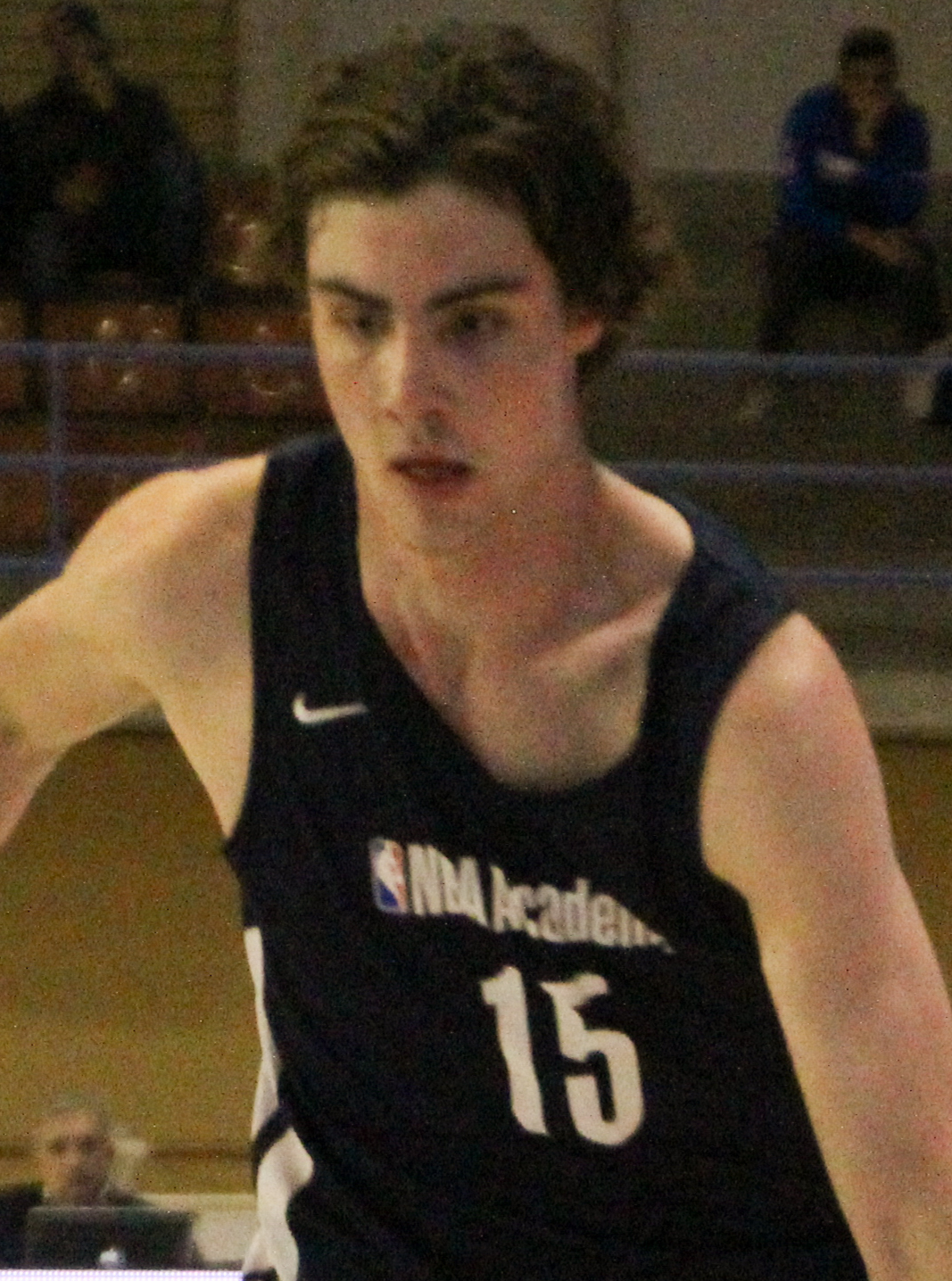
Giddey with the NBA Global Academy in 2020

At the Australian Under-18 Championships in April 2019, Giddey averaged 20 points, 8.3 rebounds and six assists per game, leading VIC Metro to the title. In January 2020, Giddey helped the NBA Global Academy win the Torneo Junior Ciutat de L'Hospitalet in Barcelona, where he earned most valuable player (MVP) honors. In the following month at NBA All-Star Weekend in Chicago, he took part in Basketball Without Borders and was named an all-star of the camp.

== Professional career ==
=== Adelaide 36ers (2020–2021) ===
On 12 March 2020, Giddey signed with the Adelaide 36ers of the National Basketball League (NBL) as a part of the league's Next Stars program to develop NBA draft prospects, and he became the first Australian player to be a part of the program. Giddey turned down offers from several NCAA Division I programs, including Arizona.

On 26 April 2021, he recorded 12 points, 10 rebounds and 10 assists in a 93–77 loss to the New Zealand Breakers, becoming the youngest Australian in NBL history to record a triple-double. In the 36ers' next game against the Brisbane Bullets on 1 May, he became the first ever Australian to record a triple-double in consecutive games, finishing with 15 points, 13 assists and 11 rebounds in a 101–79 win. He had a third triple-double on 9 May in a 97–88 overtime win over the Sydney Kings, finishing with 11 points, 12 assists and 10 rebounds. Giddey was released from the active playing roster on 17 May to prepare for the 2021 NBA draft, and finished the season averaging 10.9 points, 7.3 rebounds and a league-leading 7.6 assists per game in 28 games played. He was selected as the NBL Rookie of the Year.

=== Oklahoma City Thunder (2021–2024) ===
==== 2021-22 season ====
On 27 April 2021, Giddey declared for the 2021 NBA draft, where he was projected to be a lottery pick. On 29 July, he was drafted as the sixth overall pick by the Oklahoma City Thunder, and on 8 August, Giddey signed a contract with the Thunder. That same day, he suffered an ankle injury five minutes into his NBA Summer League debut and was ruled out for the rest of the competition as a precautionary measure. On 20 October, Giddey made his NBA debut, putting up four points, 10 rebounds and three assists in a 107–86 loss to the Utah Jazz. On 27 October, Giddey recorded his first double-double with 18 points and 10 assists in a 123–115 win over the Los Angeles Lakers, while also becoming the third-youngest player to record at least 10 assists in a game, behind only LeBron James, who did so twice. Giddey was named the NBA Western Conference Rookie of the Month for games played in October/November.

On 26 December 2021, Giddey became the second player in NBA history, after Norm Van Lier, to record a scoreless double-double, as he compiled ten assists and ten rebounds in the Thunder's 117–112 win over the New Orleans Pelicans. Giddey was named the NBA Western Conference Rookie of the Month for games played in December. On 2 January 2022, Giddey became the youngest-ever player to record a triple-double, with 17 points, 14 assists and 13 rebounds in a 95–86 loss to the Dallas Mavericks, surpassing the previous record set by LaMelo Ball. Giddey was named the NBA Western Conference Rookie of the Month for games played in January and again in February, winning the award four consecutive times.

On 27 March, Giddey was ruled out for the remainder of the season due to hip soreness, and finished the season averaging 12.5 points, 7.8 rebounds and 6.4 assists per game while shooting .419, .263 and .709 from the field, the three-point line and on free throws, respectively, with four triple-doubles. In addition, he was the sole rookie to tally at least 500 points, 400 rebounds and 300 assists.

==== 2023-24 season ====
On 10 January 2023, in a game against the Miami Heat, Giddey joined Luka Dončić, Ben Simmons and Grant Hill as the only players in NBA history to record at least 1,000 points, 700 rebounds and 500 assists in their first 100 career games. On 15 January, Giddey scored a season-high 28 points along with nine rebounds and assists, leading Oklahoma City to a 112–102 win over the Brooklyn Nets. On 12 April, during the NBA play-in tournament, Giddey recorded 31 points, 10 assists and nine rebounds in a 123–118 win over the New Orleans Pelicans, advancing the Thunder to the eighth-seed game.

On 11 January 2024, Giddey logged 13 points, 10 rebounds and 12 assists in 22 minutes against the Portland Trail Blazers. In doing so, he became the first player in NBA history to post a triple-double on 100% field-goal accuracy in under 25 minutes.

=== Chicago Bulls (2024–present) ===
==== 2024–25 season ====
On 21 June 2024, Giddey was traded to the Chicago Bulls in exchange for guard Alex Caruso. On 2 December, Giddey put up a triple-double with 20 points, 13 rebounds and 11 assists in a 128–102 win over the Brooklyn Nets. On 28 December, he put up a triple-double with 23 points, 15 rebounds and 10 assists in a 116–111 win over the Milwaukee Bucks. He also became the first player in Bulls franchise history since Jimmy Butler to record multiple games with triple-doubles in a season. On 8 March, he recorded his third triple-double of the season with 26 points, 12 assists, and 10 rebounds in a 114–109 victory against the Miami Heat. On 22 March, Giddey recorded a near quadruple-double (the last quadruple-double was achieved in 1994) with 15 points, 17 assists, 10 rebounds, and a career-high eight steals in a 146–115 win over the Los Angeles Lakers. On 27 March, Giddey put up a triple-double with 25 points, 14 rebounds, 11 assists, and hit a buzzer-beating game-winner from half court in a 119–117 win over the Los Angeles Lakers. This was Giddey's 5th triple-double of the season and he joined Michael Jordan as the only Bulls in franchise history to have 5+ triple-doubles in a single season. On 9 April, in a 119-111 win over the Miami Heat, Giddey had 28 points, 16 rebounds and 11 assists while tallying his 7th triple-double of the season. Giddey also joined Michael Jordan and Scottie Pippen as the only Bulls players to have seasons with at least 1,000 points, 500 rebounds, and 500 assists.

==== 2025–26 season ====
On 9 September 2025, Giddey re-signed with the Bulls on a four-year, $100 million contract. On 31 October, Giddey scored a career-high 32 points along with 10 rebounds and nine assists in a 135–125 win over the New York Knicks, leading the Bulls to their first 5–0 start since the 1996–97 season. On 4 November, Giddey put up a triple-double with 29 points, 15 rebounds, and 12 assists in a 113–111 win over the Philadelphia 76ers. It was his second consecutive game with a triple-double, allowing Giddey to become the first player since Michael Jordan in 1989 to record a triple-double in consecutive games in Bulls franchise history. On 17 December, Giddey put up a triple-double with 23 points, 11 rebounds, 11 assists, and a career-high-tying five three-pointers made in a 127–111 win over the Cleveland Cavaliers. He joined Michael Jordan as the only players to put up at least 10 triple-doubles in Bulls franchise history and also became the first player to put up a triple-double with at least five three-pointers made in Bulls franchise history.

Giddey made 54 total appearances (including 51 starts) for the Bulls during the 2025–26 NBA season, recording averages of 17.0 points, 8.3 rebounds, and 9.1 assists (all of which were career-highs). On May 13, 2026, it was announced that Giddey had undergone arthroscopic surgery to repair a right ankle injury.

== National team career ==
=== Junior national team ===
Giddey represented Australia at the 2019 FIBA Under-17 Oceania Championship in New Caledonia. He averaged 16.4 points, 7.4 rebounds and five assists per game and was named to the All-Star Five after leading his team to a gold medal. In the final against New Zealand, he collected 25 points, eight rebounds, six assists and five steals in an 85–56 win.

=== Senior national team ===
On 23 February 2020, Giddey made his debut for the Australia national basketball team during 2021 FIBA Asia Cup qualification. He recorded 11 points, six assists and three rebounds in 11 minutes, helping Australia defeat Hong Kong, 115–52. Giddey became the youngest player to play for the senior team since Ben Simmons in 2013.

Giddey was one of the final cuts from the Australian basketball team roster for the 2020 Tokyo Olympics and was instead selected as one of three emergency players.

Giddey represented Australia in the 2023 FIBA World Cup and averaged 19.4 points, 5 rebounds and 6 assists. He was recognised as the FIBA Basketball World Cup Rising Star.

== Career statistics ==
Legend
GP	Games played	GS	Games started	MPG	Minutes per game
FG%	Field goal percentage	3P%	3-point field goal percentage	FT%	Free throw percentage
RPG	Rebounds per game	APG	Assists per game	SPG	Steals per game
BPG	Blocks per game	PPG	Points per game	**Bold**	Career high

=== NBA ===
==== Regular season ====
Year	Team	GP	GS	MPG	FG%	3P%	FT%	RPG	APG	SPG	BPG	PPG
2021–22	Oklahoma City	54	54	31.5	.419	.263	.709	7.8	6.4	.9	.4	12.5
2022–23	Oklahoma City	76	76	31.1	**.482**	.325	.731	7.9	6.2	.8	.4	16.6
2023–24	Oklahoma City	**80**	**80**	25.1	.475	.337	**.806**	6.4	4.8	.6	**.6**	12.3
2024–25	Chicago	70	69	30.2	.465	**.378**	.781	8.1	7.2	**1.2**	**.6**	14.6
2025–26	Chicago	54	51	**32.1**	.448	.364	.763	**8.3**	**9.1**	1.0	.5	**17.0**
Career		334	330	29.7	.461	.337	.764	7.6	6.6	.9	.5	14.6

==== Playoffs ====
Year	Team	GP	GS	MPG	FG%	3P%	FT%	RPG	APG	SPG	BPG	PPG
2024	Oklahoma City	10	8	18.1	.453	.353	.875	3.6	2.1	.2	.4	8.7
Career		10	8	18.1	.453	.353	.875	3.6	2.1	.2	.4	8.7

=== NBL ===
Year	Team	GP	GS	MPG	FG%	3P%	FT%	RPG	APG	SPG	BPG	PPG
2020–21	Adelaide	28	26	32.1	.425	.293	.691	7.3	7.6	1.1	.4	10.9

== Personal life ==
Giddey's sister, Hannah, played forward for two years for the Oral Roberts Golden Eagles, and then played the 2022–23 season for Southern Nazarene University in Bethany, Oklahoma.

In November 2023, an anonymous social media user accused Giddey of having an improper relationship with an underage girl when Giddey was 19 years old. The user said the posted photos and videos depicted Giddey, then 19, with a girl who was a junior in high school. The posts were later deleted, and the social media account was deactivated. On 24 November, the NBA opened an investigation on the matter. Both Giddey and Thunder head coach Mark Daigneault declined to comment publicly on the situation. On 29 November, the Newport Beach Police Department announced that it was conducting an active investigation into "an alleged relationship between professional basketball player Josh Giddey and a female minor". The girl's family retained the services of lawyer Gloria Allred. When the Newport Beach Police Department became involved with the investigation, NBA commissioner Adam Silver stated that he would take a "backseat" to allow for law enforcement to do their due diligence. A report from CODE Sports on the matter published that the evidence highly suggested that the girl lied about her age to gain access to the nightclub that she interacted with Giddey in.

On 17 January 2024, Newport Beach Police Department announced that Giddey would not be facing any charges, due to there being no corroborating evidence. Allred stated that she was unsurprised that the case had been dropped, as the girl and her parents had declined to speak to law enforcement to protect their privacy. The NBA closed its investigation on 23 May 2024, concurring with the police investigation's conclusion that they had been "unable to corroborate any criminal activity" by Giddey.

== See also ==
- List of NBA career triple-double leaders
