= 2024–25 Adelaide 36ers season =

National Basketball League team season

- Head coach: (United States) Mike Wells
- Captain: (Australia) Dejan Vasiljevic
- Arena: Adelaide Entertainment Centre

NBL results
- Record: 13–16 (44.8%)
- Ladder: 6th
- Finals finish: Play-in finalist (lost to Phoenix 75–85)
- Stats at NBL.com.au

Player records
- Points: (United States) Davis 25.6
- Rebounds: (United States) Harrell 9.2
- Assists: (United States) Davis 8.0
- All statistics correct as of 16 February 2025.

The 2024–25 Adelaide 36ers season was the 44th season of the franchise in the National Basketball League (NBL).

On 22 February 2024, Scott Ninnis signed a two-year contract as head coach. However, on 12 August 2024, the 36ers replaced Ninnis with Mike Wells.

== Roster ==
Note: Flags indicate national team eligibility at FIBA-sanctioned events. Players may hold other non-FIBA nationalities not displayed.

2024–25 Adelaide 36ers roster
Players
Coaches

Pos.	No.	Nat.	Name	Ht.	Wt.
F	1	(Australia)	Marshall, Nick	1.98 m (6 ft 6 in)	88 kg (194 lb)
C	2	(Australia)	Nai, Ngor (NRP)	2.08 m (6 ft 10 in)	91 kg (201 lb)
G	3	(United States)	Davis, Kendric (I)	1.80 m (5 ft 11 in)	82 kg (181 lb)
G	7	(Australia)	Cadee, Jason	1.83 m (6 ft 0 in)	80 kg (176 lb)
C	8	(Australia)	Humphries, Isaac	2.11 m (6 ft 11 in)	114 kg (251 lb)
G	10	(Australia)	D'Arcy, Patrick (DP)	2.01 m (6 ft 7 in)
F	11	(South Sudan)	Mayen, Lat	2.06 m (6 ft 9 in)	94 kg (207 lb)
F	13	(Australia)	Ipassou, Fiston (DP)	1.96 m (6 ft 5 in)	93 kg (205 lb)
C	14	(Australia)	Griscti, Ben	2.11 m (6 ft 11 in)	100 kg (220 lb)
G	22	(New Zealand)	Rasmussen, Keanu (DP)	1.88 m (6 ft 2 in)	86 kg (190 lb)
F	23	(United States)	Martin, Jarell (I)	2.08 m (6 ft 10 in)	108 kg (238 lb)
F/C	24	(United States)	Harrell, Montrezl (I)	2.01 m (6 ft 7 in)	109 kg (240 lb)
F	25	(Australia)	Rigoni, Jacob	1.97 m (6 ft 6 in)	97 kg (214 lb)
G	27	(Australia)	Kubank, Tom (NRP)	2.01 m (6 ft 7 in)
G	34	(Australia)	Vasiljevic, Dejan (C)	1.90 m (6 ft 3 in)	88 kg (194 lb)
G	44	(South Sudan)	Dech, Sunday	1.95 m (6 ft 5 in)	91 kg (201 lb)

Head coach

- (United States) Mike Wells

Assistant coach(es)

- (Australia) Igor Cvjetkovic
- (Australia) Michael Lake
- (Serbia) Marko Marinović

Strength & conditioning coach(es)

- (Australia) Nik Popovic

Legend

- (C) Team captain
- (DP) Development player
- (IN) Inactive
- (I) Import player
- (SRP) Special restricted player
- (NS) Next Star player
- Injured

- Roster
Updated: 31 March 2025

=== Depth chart ===
Pos.	Starting 5	Bench 1	Bench 2	Development
PG	Kendric Davis	Jason Cadee
SG	Dejan Vasiljevic	Nick Marshall	Keanu Rasmussen	Fiston Ipassou
SF	Lat Mayen	Sunday Dech	Patrick D'Arcy	Tom Kubank
PF	Montrezl Harrell	Jarell Martin	Jacob Rigoni
C	Isaac Humphries	Ben Griscti

== Standings ==
=== Ladder ===
Pos	2024–25 NBL season											
Pos	Team	Pld	W	L	PCT	Last 5	Streak	Home	Away	PF	PA	PP
1	Illawarra Hawks	29	20	9	68.97%	4–1	W3	10–4	10–5	2941	2645	111.19%
2	Melbourne United	29	19	10	65.52%	4–1	W4	9–6	10–4	2771	2652	104.49%
3	Perth Wildcats	29	18	11	62.07%	3–2	W3	10–5	8–6	2903	2811	103.27%
4	S.E. Melbourne Phoenix	29	16	13	55.17%	2–3	L1	10–4	6–9	2787	2656	104.93%
5	Sydney Kings	29	16	13	55.17%	2–3	L3	7–7	9–6	2630	2557	102.85%
6	Adelaide 36ers	29	13	16	44.83%	2–3	L3	9–6	4–10	2736	2796	97.85%
7	Tasmania JackJumpers	29	13	16	44.83%	1–4	W1	9–5	4–11	2435	2553	95.38%
8	Brisbane Bullets	29	12	17	41.38%	2–3	L1	6–8	6–9	2678	2838	94.36%
9	New Zealand Breakers	29	10	19	34.48%	1–4	L1	6–9	4–10	2485	2650	93.77%
10	Cairns Taipans	29	8	21	27.59%	3–2	L1	4–11	4–10	2561	2769	92.49%

Updated to match(es) played on 8 February 2025. Source: NBL.com.au

The NBL tie-breaker system as outlined in the NBL Rules and Regulations states that in the case of an identical win–loss record, the overall points percentage will determine order of seeding.

=== Ladder progression ===
Leader and qualification to semifinals
Qualification to semifinals
Qualification to play-in
Last place

2024–25 NBL season
Team ╲ Round	1	2	3	4	5	6	7	8	9	10	11	12	13	14	15	16	17	18	19	20
Adelaide 36ers	8	8	6	5	5	4	4	4	4	6	9	8	8	8	8	7	7	6	6	6
Brisbane Bullets	6	10	9	9	7	8	7	8	7	9	8	7	5	7	7	8	8	8	8	8
Cairns Taipans	10	7	4	6	6	9	10	10	10	10	10	10	10	10	10	10	10	10	10	10
Illawarra Hawks	1	1	2	2	1	1	2	3	3	2	2	1	1	1	1	1	1	1	1	1
Melbourne United	2	3	5	3	4	2	3	1	1	1	1	2	2	2	2	2	3	2	2	2
New Zealand Breakers	5	2	1	1	2	3	1	2	2	3	5	9	9	9	9	9	9	9	9	9
Perth Wildcats	4	5	8	7	8	6	6	6	6	5	4	4	6	5	4	3	4	5	3	3
S.E. Melbourne Phoenix	7	9	10	10	10	10	8	7	8	7	6	6	7	6	5	5	5	4	4	4
Sydney Kings	3	4	3	4	3	5	5	5	5	4	3	3	3	4	3	4	2	3	5	5
Tasmania JackJumpers	9	6	7	8	9	7	9	9	9	8	7	5	4	3	6	6	6	7	7	7

Updated to match(es) played on 8 February 2025. Source: NBL.com.au

== Game log ==
=== Pre-season ===
2024 NBL Blitz game log
Total: 2–1 (Home: 1–1; Road: 1–0)
September: 2–1 (Home: 1–1; Road: 1–0)

Game	Date	Team	Score	High points	High rebounds	High assists	Location Attendance	Record
1	9 September	Tasmania	W 96–64	Dejan Vasiljevic (22)	Sunday Dech (7)	Kendric Davis (5)	Gold Coast Sport Centre n/a	1–0
2	11 September	@ New Zealand	91–98	Kendric Davis (23)	Isaac Humphries (11)	Kendric Davis (5)	Gold Coast Sports Centre n/a	2–0
3	13 September	S.E. Melbourne	L 49–101	Nick Marshall (14)	Nick Marshall (8)	Rasmussen, Starling (2)	Gold Coast Sports Centre n/a	2–1

=== Regular season ===
2024–25 game log
Total: 13–16 (Home: 9–6; Road: 4–10)
September: 0–2 (Home: 0–1; Road: 0–1)

Game	Date	Team	Score	High points	High rebounds	High assists	Location Attendance	Record
1	22 September	Sydney	94–102	Mayen, Vasiljevic (23)	Montrezl Harrell (13)	Kendric Davis (8)	Perth Arena; 4,168	0–1
2	28 September	@ Cairns	L 101–97	Dejan Vasiljevic (24)	Sunday Dech (8)	Kendric Davis (8)	Cairns Convention Centre; 4,141	0–2

October: 5–1 (Home: 4–0; Road: 1–1)

Game	Date	Team	Score	High points	High rebounds	High assists	Location Attendance	Record
3	3 October	S.E. Melbourne	W 93–83	Humphries, Vasiljevic (22)	Montrezl Harrell (11)	Kendric Davis (7)	Adelaide Entertainment Centre; 9,377	1–2
4	5 October	@ Illawarra	W 100–102	Kendric Davis (32)	Montrezl Harrell (10)	Cadee, Davis (4)	Wollongong Entertainment Centre; 4,770	2–2
5	11 October	Sydney	W 89–79	Dejan Vasiljevic (26)	Montrezl Harrell (14)	three players (3)	Adelaide Entertainment Centre; 9,466	3–2
6	13 October	@ Melbourne	L 106–79	Kendric Davis (17)	Montrezl Harrell (9)	Dech, Marshall (3)	John Cain Arena; 9,050	3–3
7	20 October	Tasmania	W 77–73	Kendric Davis (23)	Harrell, Humphries (7)	Kendric Davis (6)	Adelaide Entertainment Centre; 9,384	4–3
8	25 October	Cairns	W 99–93 (OT)	Montrezl Harrell (36)	Montrezl Harrell (16)	Kendric Davis (8)	Adelaide Entertainment Centre; 9,382	5–3

November: 1–3 (Home: 1–1; Road: 0–2)

Game	Date	Team	Score	High points	High rebounds	High assists	Location Attendance	Record
9	2 November	@ New Zealand	L 109–82	Montrezl Harrell (25)	Montrezl Harrell (6)	Kendric Davis (6)	Spark Arena; 5,537	5–4
10	10 November	Illawarra	W 93–79	Montrezl Harrell (25)	Davis, Harrell (7)	Kendric Davis (10)	Adelaide Entertainment Centre; 9,423	6–4
11	17 November	@ Melbourne	L 113–93	Kendric Davis (30)	Jarell Martin (9)	Kendric Davis (11)	John Cain Arena; 9,747	6–5
12	30 November	Tasmania	L 73–77	Isaac Humphries (19)	Isaac Humphries (11)	Keanu Rasmussen (4)	Adelaide Entertainment Centre; 9,428	6–6

December: 2–5 (Home: 1–3; Road: 1–2)

Game	Date	Team	Score	High points	High rebounds	High assists	Location Attendance	Record
13	6 December	@ Brisbane	L 102–83	Isaac Humphries (16)	Humphries, Marshall (6)	Keanu Rasmussen (5)	Brisbane Entertainment Centre; 5,142	6–7
14	8 December	Perth	L 105–115	Kendric Davis (37)	Jarell Martin (7)	Kendric Davis (11)	Adelaide Entertainment Centre; 9,352	6–8
15	14 December	New Zealand	W 111–94	Kendric Davis (36)	Montrezl Harrell (10)	Kendric Davis (9)	Adelaide Entertainment Centre; 9,449	7–8
16	21 December	@ S.E. Melbourne	L 106–86	Kendric Davis (24)	Isaac Humphries (10)	Kendric Davis (8)	John Cain Arena; 10,175	7–9
17	24 December	Brisbane	L 90–111	Kendric Davis (32)	Montrezl Harrell (9)	Kendric Davis (8)	Adelaide Entertainment Centre; 9,457	7–10
18	28 December	Perth	L 92–116	Dejan Vasiljevic (23)	Isaac Humphries (8)	Kendric Davis (10)	Adelaide Entertainment Centre; 9,495	7–11
19	30 December	@ Sydney	W 96–111	Kendric Davis (30)	Montrezl Harrell (10)	Kendric Davis (9)	Sydney SuperDome; 11,765	8–11

January: 5–3 (Home: 3–1; Road: 2–2)

Game	Date	Team	Score	High points	High rebounds	High assists	Location Attendance	Record
20	4 January	Melbourne	W 100–81	Davis, Harrell (28)	Montrezl Harrell (9)	Kendric Davis (11)	Adelaide Entertainment Centre; 9,588	9–11
21	10 January	@ Tasmania	L 104–103 (OT)	Kendric Davis (39)	Isaac Humphries (10)	Davis, Harrell (7)	Derwent Entertainment Centre; 4,340	9–12
22	13 January	Illawarra	W 91–88	Montrezl Harrell (26)	Harrell, Martin (9)	Kendric Davis (7)	Adelaide Entertainment Centre; 9,475	10–12
23	17 January	@ Perth	L 110–103	Kendric Davis (31)	Montrezl Harrell (9)	Kendric Davis (10)	Perth Arena; 13,570	10–13
24	19 January	@ Cairns	W 75–99	Dejan Vasiljevic (32)	Montrezl Harrell (15)	Kendric Davis (9)	Cairns Convention Centre; 4,109	11–13
25	24 January	@ Sydney	W 96–105	Kendric Davis (30)	Montrezl Harrell (11)	Kendric Davis (6)	Sydney SuperDome; 10,356	12–13
26	26 January	New Zealand	W 94–78	Montrezl Harrell (26)	Montrezl Harrell (8)	Kendric Davis (13)	Adelaide Entertainment Centre; 9,505	13–13
27	31 January	Brisbane	L 89–92	Kendric Davis (24)	Harrell, Vasiljevic (10)	Kendric Davis (10)	Adelaide Entertainment Centre; 9,521	13–14

February: 0–2 (Home: 0–0; Road: 0–2)

Game	Date	Team	Score	High points	High rebounds	High assists	Location Attendance	Record
28	2 February	@ S.E. Melbourne	L 105–99	Montrezl Harrell (25)	Montrezl Harrell (11)	Kendric Davis (7)	John Cain Arena; 8,230	13–15
29	7 February	@ Perth	L 112–104	Kendric Davis (34)	Dech, Harrell (6)	Kendric Davis (8)	Perth Arena; 13,559	13–16

2024–25 season schedule

=== Postseason ===
2025 finals game log
Total: 1–1 (Home: 0–0; Road: 1–1)
Play-in qualifier: 1–0 (Home: 0–0; Road: 1–0)

Game	Date	Team	Score	High points	High rebounds	High assists	Location Attendance	Record
1	13 February	@ Sydney	W 88–95	Dejan Vasiljevic (25)	Montrezl Harrell (8)	Montrezl Harrell (7)	Sydney SuperDome; 7,321	1–0

Play-in game: 0–1 (Home: 0–0; Road: 0–1)

Game	Date	Team	Score	High points	High rebounds	High assists	Location Attendance	Record
2	16 February	@ S.E. Melbourne	L 85–75	Kendric Davis (26)	Montrezl Harrell (14)	Kendric Davis (5)	John Cain Arena; 6,118	1–1

2025 finals schedule

== Transactions ==
=== Re-signed ===
Player	Date Signed	Contract	Ref.
Dejan Vasiljevic	29 January 2024	3-year deal	
Isaac Humphries	7 March 2024	3-year deal	
Alex Starling	29 April 2024	1-year deal	
Jacob Rigoni	7 May 2024	2-year deal (club option)	
Fiston Ipassou	30 July 2024	1-year deal	
Keanu Rasmussen	30 July 2024	1-year deal	

=== Additions ===
Player	Date Signed	Contract	Former team	Ref.
Lat Mayen	16 April 2024	1-year deal	Cairns Taipans	
Ben Griscti	21 May 2024	3-year deal	UC Riverside Highlanders	
Kendric Davis	17 July 2024	1-year deal	Santa Cruz Warriors	
Patrick D’Arcy	30 July 2024	1-year deal	Sturt Sabres	
Jarell Martin	2 August 2024	1-year deal	Galatasaray	
Tom Kubank	5 September 2024	1-year deal (NRP)	South Adelaide Panthers	
Montrezl Harrell	11 September 2024	1-year deal	Philadelphia 76ers	

=== Subtractions ===
Player	Reason left	Date Left	New Team	Ref.
Jacob Wiley	Free agent	20 February 2024	Covirán Granada	
Tohi Smith-Milner	Free agent	19 April 2024	Brisbane Bullets	
Mitch McCarron	Free agent	26 April 2024	New Zealand Breakers	
Kyrin Galloway	Free agent	29 April 2024	Cairns Taipans	
Trey Kell	Free agent	28 June 2024	Illawarra Hawks	
Akech Aliir	Free agent	5 July 2024	Melbourne United	
Trentyn Flowers	NBA draft	25 July 2024	Los Angeles Clippers	
Alex Starling	Released	18 October 2024	TBC	

== Awards ==
=== Club awards ===
- Club MVP: Kendric Davis
- Most Improved: Lat Mayen
- Coaches Award: Jason Cadee
- Members Choice: Kendric Davis
- Best Defensive Player: Sunday Dech
- Chairman's Award: Mike Wells

== See also ==
- 2024–25 NBL season
- Adelaide 36ers
