= 2024–25 Cairns Taipans season =

- Head coach: (Australia) Adam Forde
- Captain: (Australia) Taran Armstrong
- Arena: Cairns Convention Centre

NBL results
- Record: 8–21 (27.6%)
- Ladder: 10th
- Finals finish: Did not qualify
- Stats at NBL.com.au

Player records
- Points: (United States) Edwards 19.8
- Rebounds: (New Zealand) Waardenburg 6.4
- Assists: (Australia) Armstrong 4.7
- All statistics correct as of 8 February 2025.

The 2024–25 Cairns Taipans season was the 26th season of the franchise in the National Basketball League (NBL).

On 14 February 2025, Adam Forde parted ways as head coach of the Taipans during the off-season.

== Roster ==
Note: Flags indicate national team eligibility at FIBA-sanctioned events. Players may hold other non-FIBA nationalities not displayed.

2024–25 Cairns Taipans roster
Players
Coaches

Pos.	No.	Nat.	Name	Ht.	Wt.
G	1	(Australia)	Armstrong, Taran (C)	1.96 m (6 ft 5 in)	88 kg (194 lb)
G	2	(United States)	Edwards, Rob (IN)	1.96 m (6 ft 5 in)	93 kg (205 lb)
F	3	(Australia)	Stith, Dillon	2.01 m (6 ft 7 in)	98 kg (216 lb)
G	4	(Australia)	Adnam, Kyle	1.86 m (6 ft 1 in)	84 kg (185 lb)
G	5	(Australia)	Dufelmeier, Tad (NRP)	1.83 m (6 ft 0 in)	79 kg (174 lb)
G	6	(Australia)	Antonio, Jonah	1.94 m (6 ft 4 in)	88 kg (194 lb)
G	9	(South Sudan)	Makoi, Jackson (IN)	1.96 m (6 ft 5 in)	89 kg (196 lb)
F	11	(Australia)	Higgins-Titsha, Alex (DP)	2.01 m (6 ft 7 in)
F	13	(Australia)	Gak, Akoldah	2.10 m (6 ft 11 in)	102 kg (225 lb)
F	14	(Australia)	Galloway, Kyrin	2.03 m (6 ft 8 in)	98 kg (216 lb)
G	20	(Australia)	Stattmann, Kody (DP)	2.02 m (6 ft 8 in)	91 kg (201 lb)
F	21	(New Zealand)	Waardenburg, Sam	2.08 m (6 ft 10 in)	100 kg (220 lb)
F/C	22	(United States)	Groves, Tanner (I)	2.08 m (6 ft 10 in)	109 kg (240 lb)
G/F	32	(United States)	Bradshaw, Pedro (I)	2.01 m (6 ft 7 in)	82 kg (181 lb)

Head coach

- (Australia) Adam Forde

Assistant coach(es)

- (Australia) Will Lopez
- (Australia) Kerry Williams

Legend

- (C) Team captain
- (DP) Development player
- (IN) Inactive
- (I) Import player
- (TP) Training player
- (SRP) Special restricted player
- (NS) Next Star player
- Injured

- Roster
Updated: 2 February 2025

=== Depth chart ===
Pos.	Starting 5	Bench 1	Bench 2
PG	Taran Armstrong	Kyle Adnam	Jackson Makoi
SG	Rob Edwards	Jonah Antonio	Kody Stattmann
SF	Pedro Bradshaw	Dillon Stith	Alex Higgins-Titsha
PF	Sam Waardenburg	Kyrin Galloway
C	Tanner Groves	Akoldah Gak

== Standings ==
=== Ladder ===
Pos	2024–25 NBL season											
Pos	Team	Pld	W	L	PCT	Last 5	Streak	Home	Away	PF	PA	PP
1	Illawarra Hawks	29	20	9	68.97%	4–1	W3	10–4	10–5	2941	2645	111.19%
2	Melbourne United	29	19	10	65.52%	4–1	W4	9–6	10–4	2771	2652	104.49%
3	Perth Wildcats	29	18	11	62.07%	3–2	W3	10–5	8–6	2903	2811	103.27%
4	S.E. Melbourne Phoenix	29	16	13	55.17%	2–3	L1	10–4	6–9	2787	2656	104.93%
5	Sydney Kings	29	16	13	55.17%	2–3	L3	7–7	9–6	2630	2557	102.85%
6	Adelaide 36ers	29	13	16	44.83%	2–3	L3	9–6	4–10	2736	2796	97.85%
7	Tasmania JackJumpers	29	13	16	44.83%	1–4	W1	9–5	4–11	2435	2553	95.38%
8	Brisbane Bullets	29	12	17	41.38%	2–3	L1	6–8	6–9	2678	2838	94.36%
9	New Zealand Breakers	29	10	19	34.48%	1–4	L1	6–9	4–10	2485	2650	93.77%
10	Cairns Taipans	29	8	21	27.59%	3–2	L1	4–11	4–10	2561	2769	92.49%

Updated to match(es) played on 8 February 2025. Source: NBL.com.au

The NBL tie-breaker system as outlined in the NBL Rules and Regulations states that in the case of an identical win–loss record, the overall points percentage will determine order of seeding.

=== Ladder progression ===
Leader and qualification to semifinals
Qualification to semifinals
Qualification to play-in
Last place

2024–25 NBL season
Team ╲ Round	1	2	3	4	5	6	7	8	9	10	11	12	13	14	15	16	17	18	19	20
Adelaide 36ers	8	8	6	5	5	4	4	4	4	6	9	8	8	8	8	7	7	6	6	6
Brisbane Bullets	6	10	9	9	7	8	7	8	7	9	8	7	5	7	7	8	8	8	8	8
Cairns Taipans	10	7	4	6	6	9	10	10	10	10	10	10	10	10	10	10	10	10	10	10
Illawarra Hawks	1	1	2	2	1	1	2	3	3	2	2	1	1	1	1	1	1	1	1	1
Melbourne United	2	3	5	3	4	2	3	1	1	1	1	2	2	2	2	2	3	2	2	2
New Zealand Breakers	5	2	1	1	2	3	1	2	2	3	5	9	9	9	9	9	9	9	9	9
Perth Wildcats	4	5	8	7	8	6	6	6	6	5	4	4	6	5	4	3	4	5	3	3
S.E. Melbourne Phoenix	7	9	10	10	10	10	8	7	8	7	6	6	7	6	5	5	5	4	4	4
Sydney Kings	3	4	3	4	3	5	5	5	5	4	3	3	3	4	3	4	2	3	5	5
Tasmania JackJumpers	9	6	7	8	9	7	9	9	9	8	7	5	4	3	6	6	6	7	7	7

Updated to match(es) played on 8 February 2025. Source: NBL.com.au

== Game log ==
=== Pre-season ===
2024 NBL Blitz game log
Total: 0–4 (Home: 0–2; Road: 0–2)
September: 0–4 (Home: 0–2; Road: 0–2)

Game	Date	Team	Score	High points	High rebounds	High assists	Location Attendance	Record
1	7 September	@ Melbourne	L 94–87	Rob Edwards (24)	three players (8)	Pedro Bradshaw (4)	Carrara Indoor Stadium n/a	0–1
2	9 September	Sydney	L 77–99	Tanner Groves (15)	Tanner Groves (11)	Jackson Makoi (6)	Gold Coast Sports Centre n/a	0–2
3	12 September	Perth	L 76–89	Rob Edwards (16)	Tanner Groves (9)	Pedro Bradshaw (4)	Gold Coast Sports Centre n/a	0–3
4	14 September	@ Brisbane	L 85–82	Antonio, Stith (16)	Akoldah Gak (7)	Tad Dufelmeier (5)	Gold Coast Sports Centre n/a	0–4

=== Regular season ===
2024–25 game log
Total: 8–21 (Home: 4–11; Road: 4–10)
September: 1–1 (Home: 1–1; Road: 0–0)

Game	Date	Team	Score	High points	High rebounds	High assists	Location Attendance	Record
1	21 September	Illawarra	L 75–102	Tanner Groves (17)	Bradshaw, Groves (7)	Tad Dufelmeier (3)	Perth Superdrome; 2,878	0–1
2	28 September	Adelaide	W 101–97	Rob Edwards (31)	Sam Waardenburg (11)	Kyle Adnam (5)	Cairns Convention Centre; 4,141	1–1

October: 2–5 (Home: 1–2; Road: 1–3)

Game	Date	Team	Score	High points	High rebounds	High assists	Location Attendance	Record
3	4 October	Tasmania	W 90–78	Taran Armstrong (20)	Sam Waardenburg (7)	Armstrong, Edwards (5)	Cairns Convention Centre; 4,538	2–1
4	6 October	@ Melbourne	W 88–101	Rob Edwards (23)	Pedro Bradshaw (9)	three players (4)	John Cain Arena; 9,766	3–1
5	10 October	Perth	L 87–90	Rob Edwards (24)	Akoldah Gak (10)	Sam Waardenburg (7)	Cairns Convention Centre; 3,750	3–2
6	13 October	@ Sydney	L 99–73	Sam Waardenburg (22)	Sam Waardenburg (9)	Kyle Adnam (5)	Sydney SuperDome; 11,076	3–3
7	19 October	Illawarra	L 75–87	Pedro Bradshaw (18)	Pedro Bradshaw (14)	Adnam, Waardenburg (4)	Cairns Convention Centre; 4,362	3–4
8	25 October	@ Adelaide	L 99–93 (OT)	Rob Edwards (27)	Sam Waardenburg (14)	Jackson Makoi (6)	Adelaide Entertainment Centre; 9,382	3–5
9	27 October	@ Melbourne	L 106–63	Antonio, Waardenburg (11)	Antonio, Higgins-Titsha (8)	Sam Waardenburg (4)	John Cain Arena; 9,210	3–6

November: 0–4 (Home: 0–3; Road: 0–1)

Game	Date	Team	Score	High points	High rebounds	High assists	Location Attendance	Record
10	2 November	Brisbane	L 88–92	Rob Edwards (27)	Alex Higgins-Titsha (11)	Galloway, Makoi (4)	Cairns Convention Centre; 4,445	3–7
11	10 November	@ S.E. Melbourne	L 97–74	Sam Waardenburg (16)	Armstrong, Gak (7)	Jackson Makoi (7)	John Cain Arena; 6,384	3–8
12	16 November	New Zealand	L 69–77	Rob Edwards (33)	Akoldah Gak (8)	Taran Armstrong (7)	Cairns Convention Centre; 4,767	3–9
13	29 November	Sydney	L 75–81	Taran Armstrong (28)	Sam Waardenburg (10)	Edwards, Waardenburg (2)	Cairns Convention Centre; 3,899	3–10

December: 0–6 (Home: 0–3; Road: 0–3)

Game	Date	Team	Score	High points	High rebounds	High assists	Location Attendance	Record
14	5 December	@ Tasmania	L 99–90	Taran Armstrong (29)	Sam Waardenburg (7)	Sam Waardenburg (6)	Derwent Entertainment Centre; 4,340	3–11
15	7 December	@ S.E. Melbourne	L 99–94	Rob Edwards (24)	Pedro Bradshaw (10)	Sam Waardenburg (5)	John Cain Arena; 5,103	3–12
16	14 December	Perth	L 92–128	Taran Armstrong (24)	Rob Edwards (6)	Taran Armstrong (8)	Cairns Convention Centre; 4,386	3–13
17	20 December	@ Brisbane	L 107–104	Rob Edwards (27)	Tanner Groves (10)	Taran Armstrong (5)	Brisbane Entertainment Centre; 4,599	3–14
18	26 December	Melbourne	L 66–76	Tanner Groves (20)	Groves, Waardenburg (6)	Armstrong, Groves (4)	Cairns Convention Centre; 4,428	3–15
19	31 December	New Zealand	L 68–92	Tanner Groves (21)	Tanner Groves (8)	Taran Armstrong (5)	Cairns Convention Centre; 4,870	3–16

January: 4–3 (Home: 1–2; Road: 3–1)

Game	Date	Team	Score	High points	High rebounds	High assists	Location Attendance	Record
20	3 January	@ Illawarra	W 105–108	Armstrong, Edwards (28)	Bradshaw, Groves (9)	three players (3)	Wollongong Entertainment Centre; 5,087	4–16
21	12 January	@ Sydney	L 91–87	Rob Edwards (25)	Rob Edwards (7)	Sam Waardenburg (4)	Sydney SuperDome; 10,224	4–17
22	14 January	S.E. Melbourne	L 102–113	Sam Waardenburg (22)	Tanner Groves (7)	Taran Armstrong (6)	Cairns Convention Centre; 3,779	4–18
23	17 January	@ Brisbane	W 80–111	Rob Edwards (35)	Tanner Groves (8)	Kyle Adnam (6)	Brisbane Entertainment Centre; 5,587	5–18
24	19 January	Adelaide	L 75–99	Tanner Groves (23)	Akoldah Gak (10)	Taran Armstrong (5)	Cairns Convention Centre; 4,109	5–19
25	23 January	Illawarra	W 100–94	Rob Edwards (22)	Tanner Groves (9)	Pedro Bradshaw (5)	Cairns Convention Centre; 3,845	6–19
26	25 January	@ Perth	W 116–125 (2OT)	Rob Edwards (30)	Pedro Bradshaw (13)	Sam Waardenburg (9)	Perth Arena; 13,269	7–19

February: 1–2 (Home: 1–0; Road: 0–2)

Game	Date	Team	Score	High points	High rebounds	High assists	Location Attendance	Record
27	1 February	@ New Zealand	L 99–92	Bradshaw, Waardenburg (16)	Sam Waardenburg (6)	Taran Armstrong (8)	Spark Arena; 5,625	7–20
28	6 February	Brisbane	W 100–88	Taran Armstrong (28)	Taran Armstrong (10)	Taran Armstrong (10)	Cairns Convention Centre; 4,145	8–20
29	8 February	@ Tasmania	L 90–83	Tanner Groves (17)	Tanner Groves (8)	Armstrong, Bradshaw (4)	Derwent Entertainment Centre; 4,340	8–21

2024–25 season schedule

== Transactions ==
=== Re-signed ===
Player	Date Signed	Contract	Ref.
Sam Waardenburg	11 April 2024	1-year deal	
Jonah Antonio	3 May 2024	1-year deal	

=== Additions ===
Player	Date Signed	Contract	Former team	Ref.
Jackson Makoi	22 April 2024	1-year deal	Sydney Kings	
Kyrin Galloway	29 April 2024	2-year deal	Adelaide 36ers	
Tanner Groves	7 May 2024	1-year deal	SC Rasta Vechta	
Rob Edwards	24 May 2024	1-year deal	Delaware Blue Coats	
Dillon Stith	2 July 2024	2-year (club option)	Casey Cavaliers	
Alex Higgins-Titsha	11 July 2024	2-year deal (club option)	Inner West Bulls	
Kody Stattmann	11 July 2024	1-year deal	S.E. Melbourne Phoenix	
Pedro Bradshaw	30 July 2024	1-year deal	Indiana Mad Ants	
Kyle Adnam	7 August 2024	2-year deal (club option)	Illawarra Hawks	
Tad Dufelmeier	11 September 2024	1-year deal (NRP)	Dandenong Rangers	
Deshon Taylor	30 October 2024	1-year deal (NRP)	Hapoel Haifa	

=== Subtractions ===
Player	Reason left	Date Left	New Team	Ref.
Tahjere McCall	Parted ways	25 February 2024	Hapoel Holon	
Patrick Miller	Free agent	12 March 2024	Lokomotiv Kuban	
Lat Mayen	Free agent	16 April 2024	Adelaide 36ers	
Bul Kuol	Free agent	30 April 2024	Sydney Kings	
Bobi Klintman	NBA draft	26 June 2024	Detroit Pistons	
Josh Roberts	Free agent	17 August 2024	Aris B.C.	

== Awards ==
=== Club awards ===
- Club MVP: Sam Waardenburg
- Defensive Player: Sam Waardenburg
- Players’ Player: Tanner Groves
- Commitment to Community: Kian Dennis
- Members’ Choice MVP: Sam Waardenburg
- Coaches Award: Alex Higgins-Titsha
- Club Person of the Year: Dr. Josh Guy

== See also ==
- 2024–25 NBL season
