= 2024–25 Sydney Kings season =

Australian basketball club season

- Head coach: (Australia) Brian Goorjian
- Co-captains: (Australia) Shaun Bruce (Australia) Xavier Cooks
- Arena: Sydney SuperDome

NBL results
- Record: 16–13 (55.2%)
- Ladder: 5th
- Finals finish: Play-in finalist (lost to 36ers 88–95)
- Stats at NBL.com.au

Player records
- Points: (United States) Adams 18.0
- Rebounds: (Australia) Cooks 8.7
- Assists: (United States) Adams 6.1
- All statistics correct as of 13 February 2025.

The 2024–25 Sydney Kings season was the 36th season of the franchise in the National Basketball League (NBL).

== Roster ==
Note: Flags indicate national team eligibility at FIBA-sanctioned events. Players may hold other non-FIBA nationalities not displayed.

2024–25 Sydney Kings roster
Players
Coaches

Pos.	No.	Nat.	Name	Ht.	Wt.
F	0	(South Sudan)	Kuol, Bul	2.01 m (6 ft 7 in)	94 kg (207 lb)
F/C	1	(United States)	Oliver, Cameron (I)	2.03 m (6 ft 8 in)	109 kg (240 lb)
G	2	(United States)	Adams, Jaylen (I)	1.83 m (6 ft 0 in)	84 kg (185 lb)
G/F	3	(Australia)	Robertson, Tyler	1.98 m (6 ft 6 in)	107 kg (236 lb)
G	4	(New Zealand)	Le'afa, Izayah	1.88 m (6 ft 2 in)	90 kg (198 lb)
F	6	(Australia)	Galloway, Jaylin (injured)	1.97 m (6 ft 6 in)	92 kg (203 lb)
G	7	(Australia)	Bruce, Shaun (C)	1.92 m (6 ft 4 in)	87 kg (192 lb)
F	8	(Australia)	Lau, Henry (DP)	1.98 m (6 ft 6 in)
F	10	(Australia)	Cooks, Xavier (S)	2.03 m (6 ft 8 in)	83 kg (183 lb)
G/F	11	(Australia)	Amir, Klairus (DP)	2.00 m (6 ft 7 in)	80 kg (176 lb)
F	12	(South Sudan)	Noi, Kouat	2.01 m (6 ft 7 in)	103 kg (227 lb)
C	14	(Australia)	Spurgin, Jason (DP)	2.13 m (7 ft 0 in)	113 kg (249 lb)
F	15	(South Sudan)	Maluach, Makuach	1.96 m (6 ft 5 in)	89 kg (196 lb)
F	22	(Australia)	Toohey, Alex (NS)	2.01 m (6 ft 7 in)	103 kg (227 lb)
F	34	(Australia)	Leaupepe, Keli (injured)	1.98 m (6 ft 6 in)	109 kg (240 lb)

Head coach

- (Australia) Brian Goorjian

Assistant coach(es)

- (Australia) Angus Henskens
- (Australia) Daniel Kickert
- (Australia) Shaun Roger
- (Australia) Bill Tomlinson

Legend

- (C) Team captain
- (DP) Development player
- (IN) Inactive
- (I) Import player
- (SRP) Special restricted player
- (NS) Next Star player
- Injured

- Roster
Updated: 11 February 2025

=== Depth chart ===
Pos.	Starting 5	Bench 1	Bench 2	Development
PG	Jaylen Adams	Shaun Bruce	Klairus Amir
SG	Bul Kuol	Izayah Le'afa	Tyler Robertson
SF	Alex Toohey	Jaylin Galloway	Makuach Maluach	Henry Lau
PF	Xavier Cooks	Keli Leaupepe	Kouat Noi
C	Cameron Oliver	Jason Spurgin

== Standings ==
=== Ladder ===
Pos	2024–25 NBL season											
Pos	Team	Pld	W	L	PCT	Last 5	Streak	Home	Away	PF	PA	PP
1	Illawarra Hawks	29	20	9	68.97%	4–1	W3	10–4	10–5	2941	2645	111.19%
2	Melbourne United	29	19	10	65.52%	4–1	W4	9–6	10–4	2771	2652	104.49%
3	Perth Wildcats	29	18	11	62.07%	3–2	W3	10–5	8–6	2903	2811	103.27%
4	S.E. Melbourne Phoenix	29	16	13	55.17%	2–3	L1	10–4	6–9	2787	2656	104.93%
5	Sydney Kings	29	16	13	55.17%	2–3	L3	7–7	9–6	2630	2557	102.85%
6	Adelaide 36ers	29	13	16	44.83%	2–3	L3	9–6	4–10	2736	2796	97.85%
7	Tasmania JackJumpers	29	13	16	44.83%	1–4	W1	9–5	4–11	2435	2553	95.38%
8	Brisbane Bullets	29	12	17	41.38%	2–3	L1	6–8	6–9	2678	2838	94.36%
9	New Zealand Breakers	29	10	19	34.48%	1–4	L1	6–9	4–10	2485	2650	93.77%
10	Cairns Taipans	29	8	21	27.59%	3–2	L1	4–11	4–10	2561	2769	92.49%

Updated to match(es) played on 8 February 2025. Source: NBL.com.au

The NBL tie-breaker system as outlined in the NBL Rules and Regulations states that in the case of an identical win–loss record, the overall points percentage will determine order of seeding.

=== Ladder progression ===
Leader and qualification to semifinals
Qualification to semifinals
Qualification to play-in
Last place

2024–25 NBL season
Team ╲ Round	1	2	3	4	5	6	7	8	9	10	11	12	13	14	15	16	17	18	19	20
Adelaide 36ers	8	8	6	5	5	4	4	4	4	6	9	8	8	8	8	7	7	6	6	6
Brisbane Bullets	6	10	9	9	7	8	7	8	7	9	8	7	5	7	7	8	8	8	8	8
Cairns Taipans	10	7	4	6	6	9	10	10	10	10	10	10	10	10	10	10	10	10	10	10
Illawarra Hawks	1	1	2	2	1	1	2	3	3	2	2	1	1	1	1	1	1	1	1	1
Melbourne United	2	3	5	3	4	2	3	1	1	1	1	2	2	2	2	2	3	2	2	2
New Zealand Breakers	5	2	1	1	2	3	1	2	2	3	5	9	9	9	9	9	9	9	9	9
Perth Wildcats	4	5	8	7	8	6	6	6	6	5	4	4	6	5	4	3	4	5	3	3
S.E. Melbourne Phoenix	7	9	10	10	10	10	8	7	8	7	6	6	7	6	5	5	5	4	4	4
Sydney Kings	3	4	3	4	3	5	5	5	5	4	3	3	3	4	3	4	2	3	5	5
Tasmania JackJumpers	9	6	7	8	9	7	9	9	9	8	7	5	4	3	6	6	6	7	7	7

Updated to match(es) played on 8 February 2025. Source: NBL.com.au

== Game log ==
=== Pre-season ===
2024 NBL Blitz game log
Total: 2–1 (Home: 1–1; Road: 1–0)
September: 2–1 (Home: 1–1; Road: 1–0)

Game	Date	Team	Score	High points	High rebounds	High assists	Location Attendance	Record
1	9 September	@ Cairns	W 77–99	Izayah Le'afa (21)	Cameron Oliver (12)	Shaun Bruce (8)	Gold Coast Sports Centre n/a	1–0
2	11 September	S.E. Melbourne	L 101–113	Alex Toohey (26)	three players (6)	Izayah Le'afa (6)	Gold Coast Sports Centre n/a	1–1
3	13 September	New Zealand	W 90–79	Alex Toohey (24)	three players (5)	Shaun Bruce (4)	Gold Coast Sports Centre n/a	2–1

=== Regular season ===
2024–25 game log
Total: 16–13 (Home: 7–7; Road: 9–6)
September: 2–1 (Home: 0–1; Road: 2–0)

Game	Date	Team	Score	High points	High rebounds	High assists	Location Attendance	Record
1	22 September	@ Adelaide	W 94–102	Jaylen Adams (25)	Xavier Cooks (13)	Jaylen Adams (7)	Perth Arena; 4,168	1–0
2	27 September	@ Perth	W 88–89	Jaylen Adams (27)	Cameron Oliver (7)	Jaylen Adams (6)	Perth Arena; 11,800	2–0
3	29 September	Illawarra	L 89–96	Xavier Cooks (22)	Xavier Cooks (12)	Jaylen Adams (9)	Sydney SuperDome; 11,438	2–1

October: 3–4 (Home: 1–1; Road: 2–3)

Game	Date	Team	Score	High points	High rebounds	High assists	Location Attendance	Record
4	5 October	@ Brisbane	W 82–91	Xavier Cooks (23)	Xavier Cooks (7)	Jaylen Adams (10)	Brisbane Entertainment Centre; 7,009	3–1
5	11 October	@ Adelaide	L 89–79	Cameron Oliver (16)	Keli Leaupepe (10)	Tyler Robertson (5)	Adelaide Entertainment Centre; 9,466	3–2
6	13 October	Cairns	W 99–73	Shaun Bruce (21)	Cooks, Leaupepe (10)	three players (4)	Sydney SuperDome; 11,076	4–2
7	18 October	@ Tasmania	W 71–80	Xavier Cooks (15)	Xavier Cooks (12)	Xavier Cooks (6)	Silverdome; 3,255	5–2
8	25 October	@ Perth	L 87–84	Xavier Cooks (22)	Xavier Cooks (11)	Xavier Cooks (6)	Perth Arena; 11,114	5–3
9	27 October	New Zealand	L 89–93	Izayah Le'afa (23)	Cooks, Leaupepe (7)	Keli Leaupepe (5)	Sydney SuperDome; 10,078	5–4
10	31 October	@ Melbourne	L 87–83	Cooks, Oliver (18)	Cameron Oliver (16)	Jaylen Adams (7)	John Cain Arena; 6,734	5–5

November: 3–1 (Home: 2–0; Road: 1–1)

Game	Date	Team	Score	High points	High rebounds	High assists	Location Attendance	Record
11	3 November	Tasmania	W 88–60	Kouat Noi (26)	Cameron Oliver (11)	Adams, Cooks (4)	Sydney SuperDome; 9,124	6–5
12	8 November	S.E. Melbourne	W 74–69	Jaylen Adams (20)	Xavier Cooks (12)	Jaylen Adams (7)	Sydney SuperDome; 8,052	7–5
13	16 November	@ Illawarra	L 86–79	Jaylen Adams (23)	Xavier Cooks (10)	Adams, Le'afa (6)	Wollongong Entertainment Centre; 5,321	7–6
14	29 November	@ Cairns	W 75–81	Cameron Oliver (26)	Cameron Oliver (9)	Adams, Cooks (6)	Cairns Convention Centre; 3,899	8–6

December: 3–3 (Home: 1–2; Road: 2–1)

Game	Date	Team	Score	High points	High rebounds	High assists	Location Attendance	Record
15	1 December	@ Melbourne	L 101–98	Cameron Oliver (21)	Xavier Cooks (7)	Jaylen Adams (8)	John Cain Arena; 10,175	8–7
16	7 December	@ New Zealand	W 83–98	Adams, Cooks (20)	Alex Toohey (8)	Jaylen Adams (10)	TSB Arena; 3,863	9–7
17	15 December	Brisbane	W 93–81	Jaylen Adams (32)	Xavier Cooks (11)	Xavier Cooks (5)	Sydney SuperDome; 11,576	10–7
18	20 December	@ New Zealand	W 84–92	Kouat Noi (26)	Alex Toohey (11)	Jaylen Adams (9)	Spark Arena; 5,006	11–7
19	25 December	Illawarra	L 108–111	Alex Toohey (25)	Keli Leaupepe (12)	Jaylen Adams (7)	Sydney SuperDome; 8,589	11–8
20	30 December	Adelaide	L 96–111	Jaylen Adams (41)	Xavier Cooks (15)	Izayah Le'afa (3)	Sydney SuperDome; 11,765	11–9

January: 5–2 (Home: 3–2; Road: 2–0)

Game	Date	Team	Score	High points	High rebounds	High assists	Location Attendance	Record
21	2 January	S.E. Melbourne	W 110–101	Jaylen Adams (32)	Xavier Cooks (10)	Jaylen Adams (9)	Sydney SuperDome; 9,139	12–9
22	4 January	@ Brisbane	W 86–91	Jaylen Adams (21)	Cameron Oliver (9)	Jaylen Adams (8)	Brisbane Entertainment Centre; 7,028	13–9
23	9 January	Melbourne	L 88–90	Xavier Cooks (21)	Xavier Cooks (10)	Xavier Cooks (5)	Sydney SuperDome; 10,328	13–10
24	12 January	Cairns	W 91–87	Kouat Noi (27)	Cameron Oliver (17)	Jaylen Adams (5)	Sydney SuperDome; 10,224	14–10
25	19 January	Tasmania	W 88–77	Kouat Noi (32)	Xavier Cooks (9)	Jaylen Adams (6)	Sydney SuperDome; 16,705	15–10
26	22 January	@ S.E. Melbourne	W 92–103	Kouat Noi (24)	Cameron Oliver (7)	Jaylen Adams (9)	State Basketball Centre; 3,422	16–10
27	24 January	Adelaide	L 96–105	Jaylen Adams (43)	Cameron Oliver (14)	Jaylen Adams (7)	Sydney SuperDome; 10,356	16–11

February: 0–2 (Home: 0–1; Road: 0–1)

Game	Date	Team	Score	High points	High rebounds	High assists	Location Attendance	Record
28	2 February	Perth	L 97–104	Kouat Noi (24)	Xavier Cooks (12)	Makuach Maluach (5)	Sydney SuperDome; 14,112	16–12
29	7 February	@ Illawarra	L 95–75	Adams, Noi (14)	Alex Toohey (9)	Jaylen Adams (4)	Wollongong Entertainment Centre; 5,460	16–13

2024–25 season schedule

=== Postseason ===
2025 finals game log
Total: 0–1 (Home: 0–1; Road: 0–0)
Play-in qualifier: 0–1 (Home: 0–1; Road: 0–0)

Game	Date	Team	Score	High points	High rebounds	High assists	Location Attendance	Record
1	13 February	Adelaide	L 88–95	Jaylen Adams (30)	Cameron Oliver (12)	Jaylen Adams (10)	Sydney SuperDome; 7,321	0–1

2025 finals schedule

== Transactions ==
=== Re-signed ===
Player	Date Signed	Contract	Ref.
Shaun Bruce	12 March 2024	2-year deal	
Kouat Noi	2 April 2024	3-year deal (club option)	
Makuach Maluach	10 April 2024	1-year deal	
Jaylen Adams	1 July 2024	1-year deal	

=== Additions ===
Player	Date Signed	Contract	Former team	Ref.
Keli Leaupepe	15 April 2024	3-year deal (club option)	Loyola Marymount University	
Izayah Le'afa	19 April 2024	2-year deal (mutual option)	New Zealand Breakers	
Tyler Robertson	23 April 2024	3-year deal (club option)	University of Portland	
Bul Kuol	30 April 2024	3-year deal (mutual option)	Cairns Taipans	
Jason Spurgin	9 May 2024	3-year deal	Bowling Green State University	
Xavier Cooks	27 May 2024	3-year deal	Chiba Jets	
Cameron Oliver	10 June 2024	1-year deal	Hong Kong Bulls	
Jaylin Galloway	26 Angust 2024	3-year deal	Milwaukee Bucks	
Lamonte Turner	5 January 2025	1-year deal	Dynamic	

=== Subtractions ===
Player	Reason left	Date Left	New team	Ref.
Jaylin Galloway	Released	3 March 2024	Milwaukee Bucks	
Angus Glover	Mutual release	3 April 2024	S.E. Melbourne Phoenix	
Jordan Hunter	Free agent	18 April 2024	S.E. Melbourne Phoenix	
Jackson Makoi	Released	22 April 2024	Cairns Taipans	
Jonah Bolden	Free agent	2 May 2024	New Zealand Breakers	
Sam Timmins	Free agent	24 June 2024	Tryhoop Okayama	
D. J. Hogg	Parted ways	9 July 2024	Chiba Jets	
Denzel Valentine	Free agent	10 August 2024	Pallacanestro Trieste	
Jasper Rentoy (DP)	Free agent	21 November 2024	Albury Wodonga Bandits	

== Awards ==
=== Club awards ===
- Club MVP: Kouat Noi
- Coaches Award: Bul Kuol
- Player's Player: Shaun Bruce
- Defensive Player: Bul Kuol
- Hard Work Award: Keli Leaupepe
- Members Player of the Year: Alex Toohey

== See also ==
- 2024–25 NBL season
- Sydney Kings
