= 2024–25 Illawarra Hawks season =

National Basketball League season

- NBL champions
- Regular season champions
- Head coach: (United States) Justin Tatum
- Co-captains: (Australia) Sam Froling (United States) Tyler Harvey
- Arena: Wollongong Entertainment Centre

NBL results
- Record: 20–9 (69%)
- Ladder: 1st
- Finals finish: Champions (2nd title) (Defeated United 3–2)
- Stats at NBL.com.au

Player records
- Points: (United States) Harvey 17.9
- Rebounds: (Australia) Froling 7.3
- Assists: (United States) Kell 4.1
- All statistics correct as of 23 March 2025.

The 2024–25 Illawarra Hawks season was the 47th season of the franchise in the National Basketball League (NBL).

== Roster ==
Note: Flags indicate national team eligibility at FIBA-sanctioned events. Players may hold other non-FIBA nationalities not displayed.

2024–25 Illawarra Hawks roster
Players
Coaches

Pos.	No.	Nat.	Name	Ht.	Wt.
F	0	(United States)	Days, Darius (I)	2.01 m (6 ft 7 in)	111 kg (245 lb)
G	1	(United States)	Harvey, Tyler (I & C)	1.93 m (6 ft 4 in)	84 kg (185 lb)
G/F	2	(South Korea)	Lee Hyun-jung (SRP)	2.01 m (6 ft 7 in)	95 kg (209 lb)
G	3	(United States)	Kell, Trey (I)	1.93 m (6 ft 4 in)	99 kg (218 lb)
G	6	(Australia)	Hickey, William	1.94 m (6 ft 4 in)	92 kg (203 lb)
G	7	(Australia)	Triplett, Zac (DP)	1.96 m (6 ft 5 in)	85 kg (187 lb)
G/F	8	(South Sudan)	Kuany, Kuany (NRP)	2.06 m (6 ft 9 in)	91 kg (201 lb)
G/F	9	(Australia)	Swaka Lo Buluk, Wani	1.98 m (6 ft 6 in)	88 kg (194 lb)
G	10	(Australia)	McDowell-White, Kobe (DP)	1.83 m (6 ft 0 in)	98 kg (216 lb)
G/F	11	(Australia)	Grida, Daniel	1.97 m (6 ft 6 in)	93 kg (205 lb)
F/C	13	(Australia)	Froling, Sam (injured) (C)	2.13 m (7 ft 0 in)	109 kg (240 lb)
F/C	19	(Australia)	Yates, Luca (DP)	2.08 m (6 ft 10 in)	102 kg (225 lb)
F	21	(Australia)	Blanchfield, Todd	1.98 m (6 ft 6 in)	98 kg (216 lb)
F	22	(Australia)	Peatling, Mason	2.03 m (6 ft 8 in)	105 kg (231 lb)
F	25	(Australia)	Ballinger, Bradley (DP)	2.01 m (6 ft 7 in)
F/C	30	(Australia)	Olbrich, Lachlan	2.08 m (6 ft 10 in)	107 kg (236 lb)

Head coach

- (United States) Justin Tatum

Assistant coach(es)

- (Australia) Tom Cranney
- (Australia) Matt Flinn
- (Australia) Sam Gruggen
- (Australia) Joel Khalu

Strength & conditioning coach(es)

- (Australia) Alex Moore

Legend

- (C) Team captain
- (DP) Development player
- (I) Import player
- (SRP) Special restricted player
- (NRP) Nominated replacement player
- Injured

- Roster
Updated: 23 March 2025

=== Depth chart ===
Pos.	Starting 5	Bench 1	Bench 2	Development
PG	Trey Kell	William Hickey	Kobe McDowell-White
SG	Tyler Harvey	Lee Hyun-jung	Zac Triplett
SF	Wani Swaka Lo Buluk	Todd Blanchfield	Daniel Grida	Bradley Ballinger
PF	Mason Peatling	Darius Days	Kuany Kuany
C	Sam Froling	Lachlan Olbrich	Luca Yates

== Standings ==
=== Ladder ===
Pos	2024–25 NBL season											
Pos	Team	Pld	W	L	PCT	Last 5	Streak	Home	Away	PF	PA	PP
1	Illawarra Hawks	29	20	9	68.97%	4–1	W3	10–4	10–5	2941	2645	111.19%
2	Melbourne United	29	19	10	65.52%	4–1	W4	9–6	10–4	2771	2652	104.49%
3	Perth Wildcats	29	18	11	62.07%	3–2	W3	10–5	8–6	2903	2811	103.27%
4	S.E. Melbourne Phoenix	29	16	13	55.17%	2–3	L1	10–4	6–9	2787	2656	104.93%
5	Sydney Kings	29	16	13	55.17%	2–3	L3	7–7	9–6	2630	2557	102.85%
6	Adelaide 36ers	29	13	16	44.83%	2–3	L3	9–6	4–10	2736	2796	97.85%
7	Tasmania JackJumpers	29	13	16	44.83%	1–4	W1	9–5	4–11	2435	2553	95.38%
8	Brisbane Bullets	29	12	17	41.38%	2–3	L1	6–8	6–9	2678	2838	94.36%
9	New Zealand Breakers	29	10	19	34.48%	1–4	L1	6–9	4–10	2485	2650	93.77%
10	Cairns Taipans	29	8	21	27.59%	3–2	L1	4–11	4–10	2561	2769	92.49%

Updated to match(es) played on 8 February 2025. Source: NBL.com.au

The NBL tie-breaker system as outlined in the NBL Rules and Regulations states that in the case of an identical win–loss record, the overall points percentage will determine order of seeding.

=== Ladder progression ===
Leader and qualification to semifinals
Qualification to semifinals
Qualification to play-in
Last place

2024–25 NBL season
Team ╲ Round	1	2	3	4	5	6	7	8	9	10	11	12	13	14	15	16	17	18	19	20
Adelaide 36ers	8	8	6	5	5	4	4	4	4	6	9	8	8	8	8	7	7	6	6	6
Brisbane Bullets	6	10	9	9	7	8	7	8	7	9	8	7	5	7	7	8	8	8	8	8
Cairns Taipans	10	7	4	6	6	9	10	10	10	10	10	10	10	10	10	10	10	10	10	10
Illawarra Hawks	1	1	2	2	1	1	2	3	3	2	2	1	1	1	1	1	1	1	1	1
Melbourne United	2	3	5	3	4	2	3	1	1	1	1	2	2	2	2	2	3	2	2	2
New Zealand Breakers	5	2	1	1	2	3	1	2	2	3	5	9	9	9	9	9	9	9	9	9
Perth Wildcats	4	5	8	7	8	6	6	6	6	5	4	4	6	5	4	3	4	5	3	3
S.E. Melbourne Phoenix	7	9	10	10	10	10	8	7	8	7	6	6	7	6	5	5	5	4	4	4
Sydney Kings	3	4	3	4	3	5	5	5	5	4	3	3	3	4	3	4	2	3	5	5
Tasmania JackJumpers	9	6	7	8	9	7	9	9	9	8	7	5	4	3	6	6	6	7	7	7

Updated to match(es) played on 8 February 2025. Source: NBL.com.au

== Game log ==
=== Pre-season ===
2024 pre-season game log
Total: 1–0 (Home: 1–0; Road: 0–0)
August : 1–0 (Home: 1–0; Road: 0–0)

Game	Date	Team	Score	High points	High rebounds	High assists	Location Attendance	Record
1	17 August	Shanghai Sharks	W 101–88	Sam Froling (22)	Blanchfield, Olbrich (7)	Tyler Harvey (5)	Beaton Park Stadium n/a	1–0

=== NBL Blitz ===
2024 NBL Blitz game log
Total: 1–2 (Home: 0–1; Road: 1–1)
September: 1–2 (Home: 0–1; Road: 1–1)

Game	Date	Team	Score	High points	High rebounds	High assists	Location Attendance	Record
1	8 September	@ S.E. Melbourne	W 93–112	William Hickey (20)	Lee, Olbrich (5)	Harvey, Hickey (4)	Carrara Indoor Stadium n/a	1–0
2	10 September	Perth	L 93–98	Tyler Harvey (16)	Days, Hickey (7)	Trey Kell (5)	Gold Coast Sports Centre n/a	1–1
3	12 September	@ Melbourne	L 106–100	three players (22)	Darius Days (10)	William Hickey (7)	Gold Coast Sports Centre n/a	1–2

=== Regular season ===
2024–25 game log
Total: 20–9 (Home: 10–4; Road: 10–5)
September: 3–0 (Home: 1–0; Road: 2–0)

Game	Date	Team	Score	High points	High rebounds	High assists	Location Attendance	Record
1	21 September	@ Cairns	W 75–102	Darius Days (20)	Darius Days (12)	Trey Kell (4)	Perth Superdrome; 2,878	1–0
2	27 September	Brisbane	W 113–101	Trey Kell (30)	Lachlan Olbrich (8)	Lachlan Olbrich (5)	Wollongong Entertainment Centre; 3,542	2–0
3	29 September	@ Sydney	W 89–96	Tyler Harvey (21)	Sam Froling (11)	William Hickey (4)	Sydney SuperDome; 11,438	3–0

October: 3–2 (Home: 1–2; Road: 2–0)

Game	Date	Team	Score	High points	High rebounds	High assists	Location Attendance	Record
4	5 October	Adelaide	L 100–102	Trey Kell (29)	Darius Days (11)	Trey Kell (4)	Wollongong Entertainment Centre; 4,770	3–1
5	12 October	Tasmania	W 109–76	Sam Froling (21)	Darius Days (9)	Tyler Harvey (4)	Wollongong Entertainment Centre; 4,885	4–1
6	19 October	@ Cairns	W 75–87	Tyler Harvey (20)	Sam Froling (8)	Trey Kell (7)	Cairns Convention Centre; 4,362	5–1
7	24 October	Melbourne	L 87–92	William Hickey (17)	Darius Days (8)	William Hickey (6)	Wollongong Entertainment Centre; 3,558	5–2
8	26 October	@ S.E. Melbourne	W 82–88	Tyler Harvey (22)	Darius Days (7)	Sam Froling (7)	John Cain Arena; 7,428	6–2

November: 2–3 (Home: 2–0; Road: 0–3)

Game	Date	Team	Score	High points	High rebounds	High assists	Location Attendance	Record
9	1 November	@ Perth	L 113–105	Tyler Harvey (25)	Darius Days (8)	Hyun-jung Lee (5)	Perth Arena; 10,421	6–3
10	10 November	@ Adelaide	L 93–79	Trey Kell (18)	Darius Days (8)	Lachlan Olbrich (4)	Adelaide Entertainment Centre; 9,423	6–4
11	16 November	Sydney	W 86–79	Trey Kell (19)	three players (6)	Trey Kell (5)	Wollongong Entertainment Centre; 5,321	7–4
12	28 November	New Zealand	W 109–71	Lachlan Olbrich (21)	three players (7)	Tyler Harvey (5)	Wollongong Entertainment Centre; 3,774	8–4
13	30 November	@ S.E. Melbourne	L 103–100	Tyler Harvey (19)	Days, Peatling (9)	Tyler Harvey (5)	John Cain Arena; 6,040	8–5

December: 5–1 (Home: 1–1; Road: 4–0)

Game	Date	Team	Score	High points	High rebounds	High assists	Location Attendance	Record
14	6 December	@ Perth	W 111–121	Trey Kell (26)	Darius Days (11)	Tyler Harvey (6)	Perth Arena; 11,296	9–5
15	13 December	@ Melbourne	W 93–106	Tyler Harvey (31)	Sam Froling (11)	Tyler Harvey (4)	John Cain Arena; 7,692	10–5
16	22 December	Perth	W 120–88	Trey Kell (31)	Sam Froling (6)	Trey Kell (5)	Wollongong Entertainment Centre; 5,462	11–5
17	25 December	@ Sydney	W 108–111	Trey Kell (26)	Hyun-jung Lee (8)	Trey Kell (8)	Sydney SuperDome; 8,589	12–5
18	27 December	@ Brisbane	W 84–102	Trey Kell (18)	Sam Froling (12)	Hickey, Kell (4)	Brisbane Entertainment Centre; 6,405	13–5
19	31 December	S.E. Melbourne	L 105–110	Tyler Harvey (20)	Sam Froling (10)	William Hickey (4)	Wollongong Entertainment Centre; 5,487	13–6

January: 5–3 (Home: 4–1; Road: 1–2)

Game	Date	Team	Score	High points	High rebounds	High assists	Location Attendance	Record
20	3 January	Cairns	L 105–108	Tyler Harvey (23)	Trey Kell (9)	Hickey, Kell (6)	Wollongong Entertainment Centre; 5,087	13–7
21	7 January	Tasmania	W 89–84	Trey Kell (19)	Trey Kell (7)	three players (4)	Wollongong Entertainment Centre; 4,551	14–7
22	11 January	New Zealand	W 108–100	Trey Kell (31)	three players (6)	Lachlan Olbrich (6)	Wollongong Entertainment Centre; 5,562	15–7
23	13 January	@ Adelaide	L 91–88	Sam Froling (35)	Sam Froling (13)	Tyler Harvey (6)	Adelaide Entertainment Centre; 9,475	15–8
24	18 January	Melbourne	W 117–95	Trey Kell (23)	Sam Froling (10)	Tyler Harvey (9)	Wollongong Entertainment Centre; 5,021	16–8
25	20 January	Brisbane	W 121–87	Sam Froling (17)	three players (7)	Trey Kell (11)	Wollongong Entertainment Centre; 4,358	17–8
26	23 January	@ Cairns	L 100–94	Blanchfield, Harvey (17)	William Hickey (8)	William Hickey (5)	Cairns Convention Centre; 3,845	17–9
27	30 January	@ Tasmania	W 78–102	Sam Froling (18)	Sam Froling (7)	Tyler Harvey (5)	Derwent Entertainment Centre; 4,340	18–9

February: 2–0 (Home: 1–0; Road: 1–0)

Game	Date	Team	Score	High points	High rebounds	High assists	Location Attendance	Record
28	5 February	@ New Zealand	W 82–96	Tyler Harvey (29)	Mason Peatling (7)	William Hickey (9)	Spark Arena; 6,223	19–9
29	7 February	Sydney	W 95–75	Harvey, Lee (15)	Sam Froling (11)	William Hickey (8)	Wollongong Entertainment Centre; 5,460	20–9

2024–25 season schedule

=== Postseason ===
2025 finals game log
Total: 5–3 (Home: 3–2; Road: 2–1)
Semifinals: 2–1 (Home: 2–0; Road: 0–1)

Game	Date	Team	Score	High points	High rebounds	High assists	Location Attendance	Series
1	28 February	S.E. Melbourne	W 101–94	Harvey, Kell (24)	Trey Kell (10)	William Hickey (7)	Wollongong Entertainment Centre; 5,491	1–0
2	2 March	@ S.E. Melbourne	L 101–94	William Hickey (19)	Trey Kell (8)	Trey Kell (6)	John Cain Arena; 8,636	1–1
3	5 March	S.E. Melbourne	W 126–96	Trey Kell (30)	Sam Froling (12)	William Hickey (7)	Wollongong Entertainment Centre; 5,203	2–1

NBL Finals: 3–2 (Home: 1–2; Road: 2–0)

Game	Date	Team	Score	High points	High rebounds	High assists	Location Attendance	Series
1	8 March	Melbourne	L 88–96	Sam Froling (16)	Froling, Hickey (7)	William Hickey (8)	Wollongong Entertainment Centre; 5,491	0–1
2	12 March	@ Melbourne	W 100–102	Tyler Harvey (24)	Trey Kell (8)	Trey Kell (6)	John Cain Arena; 9,135	1–1
3	16 March	Melbourne	L 77–83	William Hickey (12)	Trey Kell (8)	Trey Kell (3)	Wollongong Entertainment Centre; 5,512	1–2
4	19 March	@ Melbourne	W 71–80	William Hickey (22)	Darius Days (11)	William Hickey (8)	John Cain Arena; 10,175	2–2
5	23 March	Melbourne	W 114–104	Trey Kell (26)	Trey Kell (11)	William Hickey (8)	Wollongong Entertainment Centre; 5,686	3–2

2025 finals schedule

== Transactions ==
=== Re-signed ===
Player	Date Signed	Contract	Ref.
Tyler Harvey	9 May 2024	3-year deal (club option)	
Wani Swaka Lo Buluk	27 July 2024	3-year deal	
William Hickey	23 October 2024	3-year deal	

=== Additions ===
Player	Date Signed	Contract	Former team	Ref.
Trey Kell	29 June 2024	1-year deal	Adelaide 36ers	
Darius Days	3 September 2024	1-year deal	Winnipeg Sea Bears	
Kobe McDowell-White	9 October 2024	2-year deal (club option)	Sunshine Coast Phoenix	
Kuany Kuany	8 November 2024	1-year deal (NRP)	VCU Rams	

=== Subtractions ===
Player	Reason left	Date Left	New team	Ref.
AJ Johnson	NBA draft	26 June 2024	Milwaukee Bucks	
Justin Robinson	Free agent	22 July 2024	Trapani Shark	
Gary Clark	Free agent	6 August 2024	Yokohama B-Corsairs	
Kyle Adnam	Free agent	7 August 2024	Cairns Taipans	
Biwali Bayles	Free agent	19 August 2024	BBC Nyon	

== Awards ==
=== Club awards ===
- Club MVP: Trey Kell, Tyler Harvey, Sam Froling
- Members Choice award: Tyler Harvey
- Player's Player award: Mason Peatling
- Defensive Player: Wani Swaka Lo Buluk
- Most Improved Player: William Hickey
- Community award: Luca Yates
- Club Person of the Year: Amber Morrisey
- Phil Driscoll OAM Volunteer of the Year Award: Mick Hendricks

=== NBL awards ===
- NBL Coach of the Year Award: Justin Tatum
- All-NBL First Team: Trey Kell, Tyler Harvey
- All-NBL Second Team: Sam Froling

== See also ==
- 2024–25 NBL season
- Illawarra Hawks
