= 2024–25 Perth Wildcats season =

- Head coach: (Australia) John Rillie
- Captain: (Australia) Jesse Wagstaff
- Arena: Perth Arena

NBL results
- Record: 18–11 (62.1%)
- Ladder: 3rd
- Finals finish: Semifinalist (lost to United 1–2)
- Stats at NBL.com.au

Player records
- Points: (United States) Cotton 28.6
- Rebounds: (United States) Doolittle 7.4
- Assists: (United States) Cotton 4.6
- All statistics correct as of 4 March 2025.

The 2024–25 Perth Wildcats season was the 44th season of the franchise in the National Basketball League (NBL), and their third under the leadership of head coach John Rillie.

On 17 September 2024, Rillie signed a three-year contract extension with the Wildcats to remain as head coach until the end of the 2027–28 season.

== Roster ==
Note: Flags indicate national team eligibility at FIBA-sanctioned events. Players may hold other non-FIBA nationalities not displayed.

2024–25 Perth Wildcats roster
Players
Coaches

Pos.	No.	Nat.	Name	Ht.	Wt.
G	0	(New Zealand)	Webster, Tai	1.93 m (6 ft 4 in)	89 kg (196 lb)
G	1	(New Zealand)	Russo-Nance, Dontae (DP)	1.90 m (6 ft 3 in)	90 kg (198 lb)
G/F	3	(United States)	Windler, Dylan (I)	2.01 m (6 ft 7 in)	89 kg (196 lb)
F	5	(United States)	Doolittle, Kristian (I)	2.01 m (6 ft 7 in)	105 kg (231 lb)
F/C	8	(Spain)	Almansa, Izan (NS)	2.08 m (6 ft 10 in)	104 kg (229 lb)
G/F	10	(Australia)	Henshall, Ben	1.95 m (6 ft 5 in)	90 kg (198 lb)
G	11	(United States)	Cotton, Bryce (I)	1.82 m (6 ft 0 in)	76 kg (168 lb)
F	13	(New Zealand)	Harris, Hyrum	2.04 m (6 ft 8 in)	110 kg (243 lb)
G	17	(Australia)	Harris, Michael	1.93 m (6 ft 4 in)	85 kg (187 lb)
F	22	(Australia)	Gerovich, Thomas (DP)	2.00 m (6 ft 7 in)
F	24	(Australia)	Wagstaff, Jesse (C)	2.03 m (6 ft 8 in)	103 kg (227 lb)
F/C	25	(Australia)	Pinder, Keanu	2.10 m (6 ft 11 in)	103 kg (227 lb)
F	33	(United States)	Withers, Todd (NRP)	2.01 m (6 ft 7 in)	98 kg (216 lb)
F	35	(Australia)	Okwera, David	2.08 m (6 ft 10 in)	90 kg (198 lb)
G	40	(Australia)	Pepper, Elijah	1.93 m (6 ft 4 in)	91 kg (201 lb)

Head coach

- (Australia) John Rillie

Assistant coach(es)

- (Australia) Keegan Crawford
- (Australia) Gerard Martin
- (New Zealand) Aaron Young

Strength & conditioning coach(es)

- (Australia) Josh Cavanagh

Legend

- (C) Team captain
- (DP) Development player
- (I) Import player
- (SRP) Special restricted player
- (NS) Next Star player
- Injured

- Roster
Updated: 31 January 2025

=== Depth chart ===
Pos.	Starting 5	Bench 1	Bench 2	Inactive
PG	Tai Webster	Ben Henshall	Dontae Russo-Nance
SG	Bryce Cotton	Elijah Pepper	Michael Harris
SF	Dylan Windler	Hyrum Harris	Thomas Gerovich
PF	Kristian Doolittle	Izan Almansa	Jesse Wagstaff	Todd Withers
C	Keanu Pinder	David Okwera

== Standings ==
=== Ladder ===
Pos	2024–25 NBL season											
Pos	Team	Pld	W	L	PCT	Last 5	Streak	Home	Away	PF	PA	PP
1	Illawarra Hawks	29	20	9	68.97%	4–1	W3	10–4	10–5	2941	2645	111.19%
2	Melbourne United	29	19	10	65.52%	4–1	W4	9–6	10–4	2771	2652	104.49%
3	Perth Wildcats	29	18	11	62.07%	3–2	W3	10–5	8–6	2903	2811	103.27%
4	S.E. Melbourne Phoenix	29	16	13	55.17%	2–3	L1	10–4	6–9	2787	2656	104.93%
5	Sydney Kings	29	16	13	55.17%	2–3	L3	7–7	9–6	2630	2557	102.85%
6	Adelaide 36ers	29	13	16	44.83%	2–3	L3	9–6	4–10	2736	2796	97.85%
7	Tasmania JackJumpers	29	13	16	44.83%	1–4	W1	9–5	4–11	2435	2553	95.38%
8	Brisbane Bullets	29	12	17	41.38%	2–3	L1	6–8	6–9	2678	2838	94.36%
9	New Zealand Breakers	29	10	19	34.48%	1–4	L1	6–9	4–10	2485	2650	93.77%
10	Cairns Taipans	29	8	21	27.59%	3–2	L1	4–11	4–10	2561	2769	92.49%

Updated to match(es) played on 8 February 2025. Source: NBL.com.au

The NBL tie-breaker system as outlined in the NBL Rules and Regulations states that in the case of an identical win–loss record, the overall points percentage will determine order of seeding.

=== Ladder progression ===
Leader and qualification to semifinals
Qualification to semifinals
Qualification to play-in
Last place

2024–25 NBL season
Team ╲ Round	1	2	3	4	5	6	7	8	9	10	11	12	13	14	15	16	17	18	19	20
Adelaide 36ers	8	8	6	5	5	4	4	4	4	6	9	8	8	8	8	7	7	6	6	6
Brisbane Bullets	6	10	9	9	7	8	7	8	7	9	8	7	5	7	7	8	8	8	8	8
Cairns Taipans	10	7	4	6	6	9	10	10	10	10	10	10	10	10	10	10	10	10	10	10
Illawarra Hawks	1	1	2	2	1	1	2	3	3	2	2	1	1	1	1	1	1	1	1	1
Melbourne United	2	3	5	3	4	2	3	1	1	1	1	2	2	2	2	2	3	2	2	2
New Zealand Breakers	5	2	1	1	2	3	1	2	2	3	5	9	9	9	9	9	9	9	9	9
Perth Wildcats	4	5	8	7	8	6	6	6	6	5	4	4	6	5	4	3	4	5	3	3
S.E. Melbourne Phoenix	7	9	10	10	10	10	8	7	8	7	6	6	7	6	5	5	5	4	4	4
Sydney Kings	3	4	3	4	3	5	5	5	5	4	3	3	3	4	3	4	2	3	5	5
Tasmania JackJumpers	9	6	7	8	9	7	9	9	9	8	7	5	4	3	6	6	6	7	7	7

Updated to match(es) played on 8 February 2025. Source: NBL.com.au

== Game log ==
=== Pre-season ===
2024 NBL Blitz game log
Total: 3–0 (Home: 1–0; Road: 2–0)
September: 3–0 (Home: 1–0; Road: 2–0)

Game	Date	Team	Score	High points	High rebounds	High assists	Location Attendance	Record
1	8 September	New Zealand	W 108–102	Bryce Cotton (32)	Keanu Pinder (8)	Hyrum Harris (5)	Carrara Indoor Stadium n/a	1–0
2	19 September	@ Illawarra	W 93–98	Ben Henshall (18)	Ben Henshall (10)	three players (4)	Gold Coast Sports Centre n/a	2–0
3	21 September	@ Cairns	W 76–89	Tai Webster (16)	Izan Almansa (8)	Tai Webster (5)	Gold Coast Sports Centre n/a	3–0

=== Regular season ===
2024–25 game log
Total: 18–11 (Home: 10–5; Road: 8–6)
September: 1–1 (Home: 1–1; Road: 0–0)

Game	Date	Team	Score	High points	High rebounds	High assists	Location Attendance	Record
1	20 September	S.E. Melbourne	W 106–98	Keanu Pinder (29)	Kristian Doolittle (13)	Ben Henshall (7)	Perth Arena; 11,530	1–0
2	27 September	Sydney	L 87–88	Kristian Doolittle (21)	Dylan Windler (16)	Doolittle, Pepper (3)	Perth Arena; 11,800	1–1

October: 2–3 (Home: 1–1; Road: 1–2)

Game	Date	Team	Score	High points	High rebounds	High assists	Location Attendance	Record
3	4 October	Melbourne	L 68–97	Doolittle, Henshall (12)	Keanu Pinder (10)	Bryce Cotton (5)	Perth Arena; 12,287	1–2
4	6 October	@ Tasmania	L 84–79 (OT)	Bryce Cotton (24)	Keanu Pinder (14)	Bryce Cotton (4)	Derwent Entertainment Centre; 4,340	1–3
5	10 October	@ Cairns	W 87–90	Bryce Cotton (35)	Kristian Doolittle (11)	Kristian Doolittle (4)	Cairns Convention Centre; 3,750	2–3
6	19 October	@ New Zealand	L 89–85	Tai Webster (20)	Kristian Doolittle (11)	Tai Webster (6)	Spark Arena; 5,822	2–4
7	25 October	Sydney	W 87–84	Keanu Pinder (34)	Kristian Doolittle (14)	Ben Henshall (8)	Perth Arena; 11,114	3–4

November: 4–3 (Home: 4–0; Road: 0–3)

Game	Date	Team	Score	High points	High rebounds	High assists	Location Attendance	Record
8	1 November	Illawarra	W 113–105	Ben Henshall (26)	Keanu Pinder (6)	Kristian Doolittle (7)	Perth Arena; 10,421	4–4
9	3 November	@ S.E. Melbourne	L 100–76	Elijah Pepper (17)	Kristian Doolittle (8)	Ben Henshall (5)	John Cain Arena; 8,362	4–5
10	7 November	Tasmania	W 88–82	Kristian Doolittle (18)	Kristian Doolittle (12)	Tai Webster (6)	Perth Arena; 10,793	5–5
11	9 November	@ Melbourne	L 106–97	Kristian Doolittle (21)	Keanu Pinder (10)	Doolittle, Webster (5)	John Cain Arena; 7,885	5–6
12	15 November	S.E. Melbourne	W 97–84	Bryce Cotton (33)	Izan Almansa (9)	Kristian Doolittle (5)	Perth Arena; 11,086	6–6
13	17 November	@ Brisbane	L 105–84	Keanu Pinder (27)	Dylan Windler (11)	Dylan Windler (4)	Brisbane Entertainment Centre; 6,086	6–7
14	29 November	Brisbane	W 117–89	Kristian Doolittle (17)	three players (5)	Kristian Doolittle (7)	Perth Arena; 10,937	7–7

December: 4–2 (Home: 1–1; Road: 3–1)

Game	Date	Team	Score	High points	High rebounds	High assists	Location Attendance	Record
15	1 December	New Zealand	W 123–112	Bryce Cotton (59)	Izan Almansa (8)	Bryce Cotton (7)	Perth Arena; 12,505	8–7
16	6 December	Illawarra	L 111–121	Bryce Cotton (40)	Izan Almansa (9)	four players (4)	Perth Arena; 11,296	8–8
17	8 December	@ Adelaide	W 105–115	Bryce Cotton (49)	Almansa, Withers (7)	Cotton, Henshall (4)	Adelaide Entertainment Centre; 9,352	9–8
19	14 December	@ Cairns	W 92–128	Bryce Cotton (44)	Keanu Pinder (10)	Bryce Cotton (6)	Cairns Convention Centre; 4,386	10–8
19	22 December	@ Illawarra	L 120–88	Keanu Pinder (16)	H.Harris, Windler (4)	Ben Henshall (4)	Wollongong Entertainment Centre; 5,462	10–9
20	28 December	@ Adelaide	W 92–116	Dylan Windler (24)	Keanu Pinder (10)	Bryce Cotton (12)	Adelaide Entertainment Centre; 9,495	11–9

January: 5–2 (Home: 2–2; Road: 3–0)

Game	Date	Team	Score	High points	High rebounds	High assists	Location Attendance	Record
21	5 January	@ New Zealand	W 86–96	Bryce Cotton (41)	Dylan Windler (7)	Bryce Cotton (5)	Spark Arena; 4,781	12–9
22	12 January	@ Tasmania	W 73–105	Bryce Cotton (32)	Dylan Windler (11)	Bryce Cotton (9)	Derwent Entertainment Centre; 4,340	13–9
23	15 January	@ Brisbane	W 85–112	Bryce Cotton (36)	Pinder, Windler (6)	Kristian Doolittle (4)	Brisbane Entertainment Centre; 4,491	14–9
24	17 January	Adelaide	W 110–103	Kristian Doolittle (27)	Kristian Doolittle (10)	Bryce Cotton (7)	Perth Arena; 13,570	15–9
25	22 January	Melbourne	L 93–99	Kristian Doolittle (33)	Doolittle, Pinder (7)	Bryce Cotton (5)	Perth Arena; 12,505	15–10
26	25 January	Cairns	L 116–125 (2OT)	Bryce Cotton (38)	Keanu Pinder (11)	Kristian Doolittle (4)	Perth Arena; 13,269	15–11
27	31 January	S.E. Melbourne	W 100–99	Bryce Cotton (29)	Kristian Doolittle (13)	Cotton, Doolittle (6)	Perth Arena; 13,156	16–11

February: 2–0 (Home: 1–0; Road: 1–0)

Game	Date	Team	Score	High points	High rebounds	High assists	Location Attendance	Record
28	2 February	@ Sydney	W 97–104	Bryce Cotton (30)	Keanu Pinder (10)	Bryce Cotton (4)	Sydney SuperDome; 14,112	17–11
29	7 February	Adelaide	W 112–104	Bryce Cotton (49)	Dylan Windler (12)	Kristian Doolittle (9)	Perth Arena; 13,559	18–11

2024–25 season schedule

=== Postseason ===
2025 finals game log
Total: 2–2 (Home: 2–0; Road: 0–2)
Seeding qualifier: 1–0 (Home: 1–0; Road: 0–0)

Game	Date	Team	Score	High points	High rebounds	High assists	Location Attendance	Record
1	11 February	S.E. Melbourne	W 122–105	Keanu Pinder (35)	Doolittle, Pinder (11)	Kristian Doolittle (5)	Perth HPC; 2,975	1–0

Semifinals: 1–2 (Home: 1–0; Road: 0–2)

Game	Date	Team	Score	High points	High rebounds	High assists	Location Attendance	Series
1	27 February	@ Melbourne	L 105–93	Keanu Pinder (24)	Keanu Pinder (11)	Bryce Cotton (6)	John Cain Arena; 7,473	0–1
2	1 March	Melbourne	W 96–89	Dylan Windler (27)	Doolittle, Windler (11)	Kristian Doolittle (6)	Perth Arena; 12,961	1–1
3	4 March	@ Melbourne	L 113–112	Kristian Doolittle (37)	Kristian Doolittle (10)	Bryce Cotton (6)	John Cain Arena; 5,618	1–2

2025 finals schedule

== Transactions ==
=== Re-signed ===
Player	Date Signed	Contract	Ref.
Kristian Doolittle	19 March 2024	1-year deal	
Jesse Wagstaff	11 April 2024	1-year deal	
Tai Webster	12 April 2024	1-year deal	

=== Additions ===
Player	Date Signed	Contract	Former team	Ref.
Elijah Pepper	19 April 2024	2-year deal (club option)	UC Davis Aggies	
Izan Almansa	29 June 2024	1-year deal (next star)	NBA G League Ignite	

=== Subtractions ===
Player	Reason left	Date Left	New Team	Ref.
Kyle Zunic	Free agent	21 March 2024	Keilor Thunder	
Corey Webster	Option declined	12 April 2024	Auckland Tuatara	
Jordan Usher	Free agent	13 June 2024	JL Bourg	
Alex Sarr	NBA draft	26 June 2024	Washington Wizards	

== Awards ==
=== Club awards ===
- Club MVP: Bryce Cotton
- Coaches’ Award: Hyrum Harris
- Most Improved Player: Ben Henshall
- Best Defensive Player: Kristian Doolittle
- Players’ Player: Kristian Doolittle
- Hall of Fame inductees: Jack Bendat, Greg Hire

== See also ==
- 2024–25 NBL season
- Perth Wildcats
