= 2024–25 Brisbane Bullets season =

Australian basketball club season

- Head coach: (Australia) Justin Schueller
- Captain: (Australia) Mitch Norton
- Arena: Brisbane Entertainment Centre

NBL results
- Record: 12–17 (41.4%)
- Ladder: 8th
- Finals finish: Did not qualify
- Stats at NBL.com.au

Player records
- Points: (United States) Prather 21.3
- Rebounds: (New Zealand) Harrison 9.7
- Assists: (Australia) Norton 2.9
- All statistics correct as of 8 February 2025.

The 2024–25 Brisbane Bullets season was the 39th season of the franchise in the National Basketball League (NBL), and their second under the leadership of their head coach Justin Schueller.

== Roster ==
Note: Flags indicate national team eligibility at FIBA-sanctioned events. Players may hold other non-FIBA nationalities not displayed.

2024–25 Brisbane Bullets roster
Players
Coaches

Pos.	No.	Nat.	Name	Ht.	Wt.
F	0	(Australia)	Kunen, Josh (DP)	2.03 m (6 ft 8 in)	102 kg (225 lb)
G	1	(United States)	Cook, Keandre (I)	1.96 m (6 ft 5 in)	85 kg (187 lb)
G	2	(Australia)	White, Isaac	1.88 m (6 ft 2 in)	85 kg (187 lb)
G	3	(Australia)	Savage, Kye (DP)	1.86 m (6 ft 1 in)
G	5	(United States)	Batemon, James (injured) (IN)	1.85 m (6 ft 1 in)	86 kg (190 lb)
G	6	(Australia)	Devers, Tristan (DP)	1.91 m (6 ft 3 in)
G	8	(Australia)	Norton, Mitch (C)	1.84 m (6 ft 0 in)	90 kg (198 lb)
F	9	(Australia)	Dalton, Callum	2.06 m (6 ft 9 in)	115 kg (254 lb)
F	10	(South Sudan)	Adel, Deng	2.01 m (6 ft 7 in)	89 kg (196 lb)
C	11	(Australia)	Zikarsky, Rocco (NS)	2.20 m (7 ft 3 in)	103 kg (227 lb)
F	13	(Australia)	Bannan, Josh	2.08 m (6 ft 10 in)	100 kg (220 lb)
G	14	(United States)	Adams, Josh (I)	1.88 m (6 ft 2 in)	86 kg (190 lb)
F	18	(New Zealand)	Smith-Milner, Tohi	2.05 m (6 ft 9 in)	117 kg (258 lb)
F	21	(Australia)	Bairstow, Jarred (injured)	2.01 m (6 ft 7 in)	101 kg (223 lb)
G/F	23	(United States)	Prather, Casey (I)	1.96 m (6 ft 5 in)	94 kg (207 lb)
C	24	(New Zealand)	Harrison, Tyrell (injured)	2.14 m (7 ft 0 in)	115 kg (254 lb)
G	26	(Australia)	McDaniel, Sam (injured)	1.98 m (6 ft 6 in)	102 kg (225 lb)
G	41	(Australia)	Naar, Emmett (NRP)	1.85 m (6 ft 1 in)	88 kg (194 lb)

Head coach

- (Australia) Justin Schueller

Assistant coach(es)

- (Australia) Luke Cann
- (Australia) Darryl McDonald
- (Australia) Greg Vanderjagt

Strength & conditioning coach(es)

- (Australia) Matt Hardiman

Legend

- (C) Team captain
- (DP) Development player
- (IN) Inactive
- (I) Import player
- (TP) Training player
- (SRP) Special restricted player
- (NS) Next Star player
- Injured

- Roster
Updated: 24 January 2025

=== Depth chart ===
Pos.	Starting 5	Bench 1	Development
PG	Mitch Norton	James Batemon	Kye Savage
SG	Keandre Cook	Isaac White	Tristan Devers
SF	Casey Prather	Sam McDaniel	Josh Kunen
PF	Josh Bannan	Deng Adel	Jarred Bairstow
C	Tyrell Harrison	Rocco Zikarsky	Tohi Smith-Milner

== Standings ==
=== Ladder ===
Pos	2024–25 NBL season											
Pos	Team	Pld	W	L	PCT	Last 5	Streak	Home	Away	PF	PA	PP
1	Illawarra Hawks	29	20	9	68.97%	4–1	W3	10–4	10–5	2941	2645	111.19%
2	Melbourne United	29	19	10	65.52%	4–1	W4	9–6	10–4	2771	2652	104.49%
3	Perth Wildcats	29	18	11	62.07%	3–2	W3	10–5	8–6	2903	2811	103.27%
4	S.E. Melbourne Phoenix	29	16	13	55.17%	2–3	L1	10–4	6–9	2787	2656	104.93%
5	Sydney Kings	29	16	13	55.17%	2–3	L3	7–7	9–6	2630	2557	102.85%
6	Adelaide 36ers	29	13	16	44.83%	2–3	L3	9–6	4–10	2736	2796	97.85%
7	Tasmania JackJumpers	29	13	16	44.83%	1–4	W1	9–5	4–11	2435	2553	95.38%
8	Brisbane Bullets	29	12	17	41.38%	2–3	L1	6–8	6–9	2678	2838	94.36%
9	New Zealand Breakers	29	10	19	34.48%	1–4	L1	6–9	4–10	2485	2650	93.77%
10	Cairns Taipans	29	8	21	27.59%	3–2	L1	4–11	4–10	2561	2769	92.49%

Updated to match(es) played on 8 February 2025. Source: NBL.com.au

The NBL tie-breaker system as outlined in the NBL Rules and Regulations states that in the case of an identical win–loss record, the overall points percentage will determine order of seeding.

=== Ladder progression ===
Leader and qualification to semifinals
Qualification to semifinals
Qualification to play-in
Last place

2024–25 NBL season
Team ╲ Round	1	2	3	4	5	6	7	8	9	10	11	12	13	14	15	16	17	18	19	20
Adelaide 36ers	8	8	6	5	5	4	4	4	4	6	9	8	8	8	8	7	7	6	6	6
Brisbane Bullets	6	10	9	9	7	8	7	8	7	9	8	7	5	7	7	8	8	8	8	8
Cairns Taipans	10	7	4	6	6	9	10	10	10	10	10	10	10	10	10	10	10	10	10	10
Illawarra Hawks	1	1	2	2	1	1	2	3	3	2	2	1	1	1	1	1	1	1	1	1
Melbourne United	2	3	5	3	4	2	3	1	1	1	1	2	2	2	2	2	3	2	2	2
New Zealand Breakers	5	2	1	1	2	3	1	2	2	3	5	9	9	9	9	9	9	9	9	9
Perth Wildcats	4	5	8	7	8	6	6	6	6	5	4	4	6	5	4	3	4	5	3	3
S.E. Melbourne Phoenix	7	9	10	10	10	10	8	7	8	7	6	6	7	6	5	5	5	4	4	4
Sydney Kings	3	4	3	4	3	5	5	5	5	4	3	3	3	4	3	4	2	3	5	5
Tasmania JackJumpers	9	6	7	8	9	7	9	9	9	8	7	5	4	3	6	6	6	7	7	7

Updated to match(es) played on 8 February 2025. Source: NBL.com.au

== Game log ==
=== Pre-season ===
2024 NBL Blitz game log
Total: 3–0 (Home: 2–0; Road: 1–0)
September: 3–0 (Home: 2–0; Road: 1–0)

Game	Date	Team	Score	High points	High rebounds	High assists	Location Attendance	Record
1	7 September	@ Tasmania	W 76–89	James Batemon (20)	Casey Prather (5)	three players (3)	Carrara Indoor Stadium n/a	1–0
2	10 September	Melbourne	W 111–104	Tyrell Harrison (21)	Tyrell Harrison (10)	James Batemon (6)	Gold Coast Sports Centre n/a	0–2
3	14 September	Cairns	W 85–82	Keandre Cook (20)	Harrison, Prather (7)	James Batemon (4)	Gold Coast Sports Centre n/a	3–0

=== Regular season ===
2024–25 game log
Total: 12–17 (Home: 6–8; Road: 6–9)
September: 0–2 (Home: 0–0; Road: 0–2)

Game	Date	Team	Score	High points	High rebounds	High assists	Location Attendance	Record
1	21 September	@ New Zealand	L 91–87	Keandre Cook (25)	Tyrell Harrison (5)	James Batemon (4)	Perth Superdrome; 2,691	0–1
2	27 September	@ Illawarra	L 113–101	Keandre Cook (17)	Tyrell Harrison (10)	Casey Prather (6)	Wollongong Entertainment Centre; 3,542	0–2

October: 2–2 (Home: 1–2; Road: 1–0)

Game	Date	Team	Score	High points	High rebounds	High assists	Location Attendance	Record
3	5 October	Sydney	L 82–91	Casey Prather (17)	Josh Bannan (11)	Tyrell Harrison (5)	Brisbane Entertainment Centre; 7,009	0–3
4	12 October	@ S.E. Melbourne	W 85–87	Tyrell Harrison (21)	Tyrell Harrison (17)	Josh Bannan (5)	John Cain Arena; 6,521	1–3
5	17 October	New Zealand	W 84–73	James Batemon (21)	Josh Bannan (9)	four players (3)	Brisbane Entertainment Centre; 4,391	2–3
6	26 October	Tasmania	L 79–87	Mitch Norton (20)	Tyrell Harrison (10)	Mitch Norton (5)	Brisbane Entertainment Centre; 4,756	2–4

November: 2–3 (Home: 1–1; Road: 1–2)

Game	Date	Team	Score	High points	High rebounds	High assists	Location Attendance	Record
7	2 November	@ Cairns	W 88–92	James Batemon (21)	Tyrell Harrison (20)	Batemon, Cook (3)	Cairns Convention Centre; 4,445	3–4
8	7 November	Melbourne	L 103–120	Keandre Cook (23)	Casey Prather (8)	Keandre Cook (5)	Brisbane Entertainment Centre; 4,101	3–5
9	15 November	@ Tasmania	L 95–92	Keandre Cook (23)	Josh Bannan (9)	Bannan, Prather (4)	Derwent Entertainment Centre; 4,340	3–6
10	17 November	Perth	W 105–84	James Batemon (51)	Josh Bannan (9)	Mitch Norton (6)	Brisbane Entertainment Centre; 6,086	4–6
11	29 November	@ Perth	L 117–89	Casey Prather (31)	Rocco Zikarsky (8)	Mitch Norton (4)	Perth Arena; 10,937	4–7

December: 5–3 (Home: 3–1; Road: 2–2)

Game	Date	Team	Score	High points	High rebounds	High assists	Location Attendance	Record
12	6 December	Adelaide	W 102–83	Casey Prather (33)	Tyrell Harrison (18)	Mitch Norton (5)	Brisbane Entertainment Centre; 5,142	5–7
13	8 December	@ Melbourne	W 114–122	Cook, Prather (27)	Casey Prather (7)	Keandre Cook (5)	John Cain Arena; 8,639	6–7
14	12 December	S.E. Melbourne	W 116–108	Keandre Cook (33)	Tyrell Harrison (12)	Keandre Cook (4)	Brisbane Entertainment Centre; 3,757	7–7
15	15 December	@ Sydney	L 93–81	Casey Prather (28)	Casey Prather (9)	Cook, Norton (4)	Sydney SuperDome; 11,576	7–8
16	20 December	Cairns	W 107–104	Casey Prather (35)	Bannan, Cook (6)	James Batemon (7)	Brisbane Entertainment Centre; 4,599	8–8
17	24 December	@ Adelaide	W 90–111	Casey Prather (36)	Tyrell Harrison (12)	Norton, Prather (5)	Adelaide Entertainment Centre; 9,457	9–8
18	27 December	Illawarra	L 84–102	Casey Prather (28)	Tyrell Harrison (9)	Naar, Smith-Milner (2)	Brisbane Entertainment Centre; 6,405	9–9
19	29 December	@ Tasmania	L 95–86	Keandre Cook (20)	Tyrell Harrison (12)	Mitch Norton (6)	Derwent Entertainment Centre; 4,340	9–10

January: 3–6 (Home: 1–4; Road: 2–2)

Game	Date	Team	Score	High points	High rebounds	High assists	Location Attendance	Record
20	4 January	Sydney	L 86–91	Casey Prather (18)	Tyrell Harrison (12)	Keandre Cook (5)	Brisbane Entertainment Centre; 7,028	9–11
21	8 January	New Zealand	W 83–74	Casey Prather (31)	Casey Prather (10)	Casey Prather (6)	Brisbane Entertainment Centre; 5,341	10–11
22	11 January	@ S.E. Melbourne	L 105–86	Josh Bannan (23)	Casey Prather (11)	Casey Prather (2)	Gippsland Indoor Stadium; 3,082	10–12
23	15 January	Perth	L 85–112	Casey Prather (32)	Bannan, Prather (11)	Keandre Cook (5)	Brisbane Entertainment Centre; 4,491	10–13
24	17 January	Cairns	L 80–111	Casey Prather (22)	Josh Bannan (12)	Adams, Norton (3)	Brisbane Entertainment Centre; 5,587	10–14
25	20 January	@ Illawarra	L 121–87	Keandre Cook (19)	Keandre Cook (8)	Josh Bannan (5)	Wollongong Entertainment Centre; 4,358	10–15
26	24 January	@ New Zealand	W 87–93	Keandre Cook (26)	Casey Prather (8)	Keandre Cook (6)	Wolfbrook Arena; 4,196	11–15
27	26 January	Melbourne	L 88–115	Josh Adams (23)	Tohi Smith-Milner (8)	Josh Adams (4)	Brisbane Entertainment Centre; 7,229	11–16
28	31 January	@ Adelaide	W 89–92	Casey Prather (26)	Tohi Smith-Milner (10)	three players (4)	Adelaide Entertainment Centre; 9,521	12–16

February: 0–1 (Home: 0–0; Road: 0–1)

Game	Date	Team	Score	High points	High rebounds	High assists	Location Attendance	Record
29	6 February	@ Cairns	L 100–88	Keandre Cook (28)	Cook, Smith-Milner (7)	Keandre Cook (6)	Cairns Convention Centre; 4,145	12–17

2024–25 season schedule

== Transactions ==
=== Re-signed ===
Player	Date Signed	Contract	Ref.
Isaac White	10 April 2024	1-year deal	
Mitch Norton	10 April 2024	3-year deal	
Casey Prather	10 April 2024	1-year deal	
Tristan Devers	14 June 2024	3-year deal (club option)	
Tyrell Harrison	29 September 2024	2-year deal	

=== Additions ===
Player	Date Signed	Contract	Former team	Ref.
Deng Adel	15 April 2024	1-year deal	Boulazac Basket Dordogne	
Tohi Smith-Milner	19 April 2024	2-year deal (club option)	Adelaide 36ers	
Keandre Cook	21 May 2024	1-year deal	Crailsheim Merlins	
Jarred Bairstow	12 July 2024	1-year deal	Tasmania JackJumpers	
James Batemon	17 July 2024	2-year deal	Ironi Kiryat Ata	
Emmett Naar	29 October 2024	1-year deal (NRP)	Mackay Meteors	
Josh Adams	2 January 2025	1-year deal	Maroussi	
Callum Dalton	24 January 2025	1-year deal (NRP)	Melbourne United	

=== Subtractions ===
Player	Reason left	Date Left	New Team	Ref.
Shannon Scott	Mutual release	5 March 2024	Kaohsiung Aquas	
Nathan Sobey	Released	29 March 2024	S.E. Melbourne Phoenix	
Chris Smith	Mutual release	11 April 2024	Chiba Jets	
D. J. Mitchell	Free agent	25 September 2024	Manchester Basketball	
Aron Baynes	Retired	17 October 2024	n/a	

== Awards ==
=== Club awards ===
- Club MVP: Casey Prather
- Players Player: Mitch Norton
- Defensive Player of the Year: Mitch Norton
- Youth Player of the Year: Josh Bannan
- Narelle Kelly Award: Kate Harris
- Volunteer of the Year: Molly Robinson

== See also ==
- 2024–25 NBL season
- Brisbane Bullets
