= 2024–25 Melbourne United season =

Australian professional basketball season

- Head coach: (Australia) Dean Vickerman
- Captain: (Australia) Chris Goulding
- Arena: John Cain Arena

NBL results
- Record: 19–10 (65.5%)
- Ladder: 2nd
- Finals finish: Runners-up (lost to Hawks 2–3)
- Stats at NBL.com.au

Player records
- Points: (Australia) Goulding 18.4
- Rebounds: (Australia) White 9.4
- Assists: (Australia) Dellavedova 7.1
- All statistics correct as of 23 March 2025.

The 2024–25 Melbourne United season was the 42nd season of the franchise in the National Basketball League (NBL), and their 11th under the banner of Melbourne United. This is their eighth season under head coach Dean Vickerman.

== Roster ==
Note: Flags indicate national team eligibility at FIBA-sanctioned events. Players may hold other non-FIBA nationalities not displayed.

2024–25 Melbourne United roster
Players
Coaches

Pos.	No.	Nat.	Name	Ht.	Wt.
F/C	2	(New Zealand)	Loe, Robert	2.11 m (6 ft 11 in)	115 kg (254 lb)
G	3	(Australia)	Blogg, Campbell (DP)	1.94 m (6 ft 4 in)	88 kg (194 lb)
G	4	(Australia)	Daniels, Dash (TP)	1.96 m (6 ft 5 in)	90 kg (198 lb)
G	5	(Australia)	Foxwell, Joel (DP)	1.85 m (6 ft 1 in)
F	7	(Australia)	Aliir, Akech	2.04 m (6 ft 8 in)	102 kg (225 lb)
G	8	(Australia)	Dellavedova, Matthew	1.93 m (6 ft 4 in)	91 kg (201 lb)
G	11	(New Zealand)	Cameron, Flynn	1.96 m (6 ft 5 in)	95 kg (209 lb)
G	13	(Australia)	Krebs, Tanner	1.98 m (6 ft 6 in)	95 kg (209 lb)
F	14	(Australia)	White, Jack	2.00 m (6 ft 7 in)	102 kg (225 lb)
F	15	(Australia)	Bowen, Kyle	2.04 m (6 ft 8 in)	101 kg (223 lb)
G	21	(United States)	Clark, Ian (I)	1.90 m (6 ft 3 in)	79 kg (174 lb)
F/C	24	(United States)	Lee, Marcus (I)	2.11 m (6 ft 11 in)	99 kg (218 lb)
F	30	(Australia)	Koppens, Tom (DP)	2.01 m (6 ft 7 in)	84 kg (185 lb)
G	43	(Australia)	Goulding, Chris (C)	1.92 m (6 ft 4 in)	92 kg (203 lb)
G	51	(New Zealand)	Ili, Shea	1.84 m (6 ft 0 in)	88 kg (194 lb)

Head coach

- (Australia) Dean Vickerman

Assistant coach(es)

- (Australia) David Barlow
- (Australia) Rhys Carter
- (Australia) Jacob Chance

Team manager

- (Australia) Stephan Semerci

Legend

- (C) Team captain
- (DP) Development player
- (IN) Inactive
- (I) Import player
- (TP) Training player
- (SRP) Special restricted player
- (NS) Next Star player
- Injured

- Roster
Updated: 23 December 2024

=== Depth chart ===
Pos.	Starting 5	Bench 1	Development
PG	Shea Ili	Flynn Cameron	Joel Foxwell
SG	Matthew Dellavedova	Ian Clark	Campbell Blogg
SF	Chris Goulding	Tanner Krebs
PF	Jack White	Kyle Bowen	Tom Koppens
C	Marcus Lee	Robert Loe	Akech Aliir

== Standings ==
=== Ladder ===
Pos	2024–25 NBL season											
Pos	Team	Pld	W	L	PCT	Last 5	Streak	Home	Away	PF	PA	PP
1	Illawarra Hawks	29	20	9	68.97%	4–1	W3	10–4	10–5	2941	2645	111.19%
2	Melbourne United	29	19	10	65.52%	4–1	W4	9–6	10–4	2771	2652	104.49%
3	Perth Wildcats	29	18	11	62.07%	3–2	W3	10–5	8–6	2903	2811	103.27%
4	S.E. Melbourne Phoenix	29	16	13	55.17%	2–3	L1	10–4	6–9	2787	2656	104.93%
5	Sydney Kings	29	16	13	55.17%	2–3	L3	7–7	9–6	2630	2557	102.85%
6	Adelaide 36ers	29	13	16	44.83%	2–3	L3	9–6	4–10	2736	2796	97.85%
7	Tasmania JackJumpers	29	13	16	44.83%	1–4	W1	9–5	4–11	2435	2553	95.38%
8	Brisbane Bullets	29	12	17	41.38%	2–3	L1	6–8	6–9	2678	2838	94.36%
9	New Zealand Breakers	29	10	19	34.48%	1–4	L1	6–9	4–10	2485	2650	93.77%
10	Cairns Taipans	29	8	21	27.59%	3–2	L1	4–11	4–10	2561	2769	92.49%

Updated to match(es) played on 8 February 2025. Source: NBL.com.au

The NBL tie-breaker system as outlined in the NBL Rules and Regulations states that in the case of an identical win–loss record, the overall points percentage will determine order of seeding.

=== Ladder progression ===
Leader and qualification to semifinals
Qualification to semifinals
Qualification to play-in
Last place

2024–25 NBL season
Team ╲ Round	1	2	3	4	5	6	7	8	9	10	11	12	13	14	15	16	17	18	19	20
Adelaide 36ers	8	8	6	5	5	4	4	4	4	6	9	8	8	8	8	7	7	6	6	6
Brisbane Bullets	6	10	9	9	7	8	7	8	7	9	8	7	5	7	7	8	8	8	8	8
Cairns Taipans	10	7	4	6	6	9	10	10	10	10	10	10	10	10	10	10	10	10	10	10
Illawarra Hawks	1	1	2	2	1	1	2	3	3	2	2	1	1	1	1	1	1	1	1	1
Melbourne United	2	3	5	3	4	2	3	1	1	1	1	2	2	2	2	2	3	2	2	2
New Zealand Breakers	5	2	1	1	2	3	1	2	2	3	5	9	9	9	9	9	9	9	9	9
Perth Wildcats	4	5	8	7	8	6	6	6	6	5	4	4	6	5	4	3	4	5	3	3
S.E. Melbourne Phoenix	7	9	10	10	10	10	8	7	8	7	6	6	7	6	5	5	5	4	4	4
Sydney Kings	3	4	3	4	3	5	5	5	5	4	3	3	3	4	3	4	2	3	5	5
Tasmania JackJumpers	9	6	7	8	9	7	9	9	9	8	7	5	4	3	6	6	6	7	7	7

Updated to match(es) played on 8 February 2025. Source: NBL.com.au

== Game log ==
=== Pre-season ===
2024 NBL Blitz game log
Total: 2–1 (Home: 2–0; Road: 0–1)
September: 2–1 (Home: 2–0; Road: 0–1)

Game	Date	Team	Score	High points	High rebounds	High assists	Location Attendance	Record
1	7 September	Cairns	W 94–87	Ian Clark (16)	Robert Loe (12)	Shea Ili (5)	Gold Coast Sports Centre n/a	1–0
2	10 September	@ Brisbane	L 111–104	Ian Clark (23)	Jack White (13)	Shea Ili (6)	Gold Coast Sports Centre n/a	1–1
3	12 September	Illawarra	W 106–100	Jack White (24)	Loe, White (9)	Shea Ili (9)	Gold Coast Sports Centre n/a	2–1

=== Regular season ===
2024–25 game log
Total: 19–10 (Home: 9–6; Road: 10–4)
September: 2–1 (Home: 1–0; Road: 1–1)

Game	Date	Team	Score	High points	High rebounds	High assists	Location Attendance	Record
1	19 September	Tasmania	W 88–79	Matthew Dellavedova (21)	Robert Loe (8)	Matthew Dellavedova (6)	Perth Arena; 4,666	1–0
2	26 September	@ S.E. Melbourne	W 84–96	Chris Goulding (19)	Jack White (8)	Matthew Dellavedova (10)	John Cain Arena; 10,175	2–0
3	28 September	@ Tasmania	L 81–72	Jack White (21)	Jack White (12)	Matthew Dellavedova (5)	Derwent Entertainment Centre; 4,340	2–1

October: 5–2 (Home: 3–2; Road: 2–0)

Game	Date	Team	Score	High points	High rebounds	High assists	Location Attendance	Record
4	4 October	@ Perth	W 68–97	Ian Clark (25)	Jack White (11)	Shea Ili (9)	Perth Arena; 12,287	3–1
5	6 October	Cairns	L 88–101	Chris Goulding (22)	Jack White (11)	Matthew Dellavedova (7)	John Cain Arena; 9,766	3–2
6	13 October	Adelaide	W 106–79	Ian Clark (18)	Jack White (7)	Matthew Dellavedova (8)	John Cain Arena; 9,050	4–2
7	20 October	S.E. Melbourne	L 84–93	Ian Clark (19)	Jack White (10)	Matthew Dellavedova (9)	John Cain Arena; 10,175	4–3
8	24 October	@ Illawarra	W 87–92	Chris Goulding (25)	Jack White (19)	Cameron, Clark (4)	Wollongong Entertainment Centre; 3,558	5–3
9	27 October	Cairns	W 106–63	Flynn Cameron (18)	Jack White (13)	Kyle Bowen (5)	John Cain Arena; 9,210	6–3
10	31 October	Sydney	W 87–83	Matthew Dellavedova (16)	Jack White (11)	Matthew Dellavedova (5)	John Cain Arena; 6,734	7–3

November: 3–1 (Home: 2–1; Road: 1–0)

Game	Date	Team	Score	High points	High rebounds	High assists	Location Attendance	Record
11	4 November	New Zealand	L 79–113	Flynn Cameron (20)	Bowen, Lee (5)	Kyle Bowen (4)	John Cain Arena; 9,275	7–4
12	7 November	@ Brisbane	W 103–120	Robert Loe (30)	Jack White (17)	Matthew Dellavedova (6)	Brisbane Entertainment Centre; 4,101	8–4
13	9 November	Perth	W 106–97	Chris Goulding (46)	Bowen, Ili (5)	Matthew Dellavedova (12)	John Cain Arena; 7,885	9–4
14	17 November	Adelaide	W 113–93	Flynn Cameron (21)	Kyle Bowen (9)	Matthew Dellavedova (7)	John Cain Arena; 9,747	10–4

December: 3–4 (Home: 1–3; Road: 2–1)

Game	Date	Team	Score	High points	High rebounds	High assists	Location Attendance	Record
15	1 December	Sydney	W 101–98	Chris Goulding (28)	Jack White (12)	Matthew Dellavedova (9)	John Cain Arena; 10,175	11–4
16	5 December	@ New Zealand	W 70–97	Robert Loe (25)	Jack White (10)	Matthew Dellavedova (7)	Wolfbrook Arena; 3,818	12–4
17	8 December	Brisbane	L 114–122	Ian Clark (24)	Jack White (10)	Matthew Dellavedova (7)	John Cain Arena; 8,639	12–5
18	13 December	Illawarra	L 93–106	Robert Loe (19)	Tom Koppens (9)	Matthew Dellavedova (8)	John Cain Arena; 7,692	12–6
19	15 December	@ S.E. Melbourne	L 109–97	Ian Clark (20)	Jack White (5)	Matthew Dellavedova (8)	John Cain Arena; 9,437	12–7
20	23 December	Tasmania	L 91–97	Chris Goulding (18)	Jack White (9)	Matthew Dellavedova (9)	John Cain Arena; 10,175	12–8
21	26 December	@ Cairns	W 66–76	Chris Goulding (19)	Marcus Lee (10)	Matthew Dellavedova (6)	Cairns Convention Centre; 4,428	13–8

January: 5–2 (Home: 0–0; Road: 5–2)

Game	Date	Team	Score	High points	High rebounds	High assists	Location Attendance	Record
22	4 January	@ Adelaide	L 100–81	Chris Goulding (18)	Robert Loe (12)	Matthew Dellavedova (9)	Adelaide Entertainment Centre; 9,588	13–9
23	9 January	@ Sydney	W 88–90	Jack White (23)	Jack White (10)	Matthew Dellavedova (8)	Sydney SuperDome; 10,328	14–9
24	13 January	@ New Zealand	W 89–91	Chris Goulding (42)	Jack White (13)	Matthew Dellavedova (6)	TSB Stadium; 2,110	15–9
25	18 January	@ Illawarra	L 117–95	Shea Ili (20)	Robert Loe (9)	Matthew Dellavedova (8)	Wollongong Entertainment Centre; 5,021	15–10
26	22 January	@ Perth	W 93–99	Jack White (26)	Jack White (16)	Matthew Dellavedova (7)	Perth Arena; 12,505	16–10
27	26 January	@ Brisbane	W 88–115	Ian Clark (24)	Robert Loe (8)	Shea Ili (8)	Brisbane Entertainment Centre; 7,229	17–10

February: 2–0 (Home: 2–0; Road: 0–0)

Game	Date	Team	Score	High points	High rebounds	High assists	Location Attendance	Record
28	1 February	Tasmania	W 94–92	Shea Ili (18)	Marcus Lee (10)	Matthew Dellavedova (8)	John Cain Arena; 10,175	18–10
29	8 February	S.E. Melbourne	W 103–93	Shea Ili (18)	Robert Loe (10)	Matthew Dellavedova (6)	John Cain Arena; 10,175	19–10

2024–25 season schedule

=== Postseason ===
2025 finals game log
Total: 4–4 (Home: 2–2; Road: 2–2)
Semifinals: 2–1 (Home: 2–0; Road: 0–1)

Game	Date	Team	Score	High points	High rebounds	High assists	Location Attendance	Series
1	27 February	Perth	W 105–93	Chris Goulding (41)	Jack White (10)	Matthew Dellavedova (9)	John Cain Arena; 7,473	1–0
2	1 March	@ Perth	L 96–89	Chris Goulding (15)	Matthew Dellavedova (8)	Matthew Dellavedova (12)	Perth Arena; 12,961	1–1
3	4 March	Perth	W 113–112	Ian Clark (38)	Jack White (9)	Matthew Dellavedova (11)	John Cain Arena; 5,618	2–1

NBL Finals: 2–3 (Home: 0–2; Road: 2–1)

Game	Date	Team	Score	High points	High rebounds	High assists	Location Attendance	Series
1	8 March	@ Illawarra	W 88–96	Matthew Dellavedova (18)	Marcus Lee (15)	three players (4)	Wollongong Entertainment Centre; 5,491	1–0
2	12 March	Illawarra	L 100–102	Ian Clark (31)	Lee, White (6)	Matthew Dellavedova (5)	John Cain Arena; 9,135	1–1
3	16 March	@ Illawarra	W 77–83	Jack White (20)	Marcus Lee (8)	Matthew Dellavedova (11)	Wollongong Entertainment Centre; 5,512	2–1
4	19 March	Illawarra	L 71–80	Dellavedova, Goulding (17)	Matthew Dellavedova (7)	Matthew Dellavedova (6)	John Cain Arena; 10,175	2–2
5	23 March	@ Illawarra	L 114–104	Chris Goulding (21)	Jack White (7)	Matthew Dellavedova (7)	Wollongong Entertainment Centre; 5,686	2–3

2025 finals schedule

== Transactions ==
=== Re-signed ===
Player	Date Signed	Contract	Ref.
Chris Goulding	10 April 2024	2-year deal	
Tom Koppens (DP)	2 May 2024	1-year deal	
Campbell Blogg (DP)	25 June 2024	1-year deal	
Ian Clark	27 July 2024	1-year deal	

=== Additions ===
Player	Date Signed	Contract	Former team	Ref.
Robert Loe	17 April 2024	1-year deal	Auckland Tuatara	
Jack White	18 May 2024	2-year deal (player option)	Memphis Grizzlies	
Marcus Lee	9 August 2024	1-year deal	Tasmania JackJumpers	
Joel Foxwell (DP)	27 August 2024	1-year deal	Sandringham Sabres	
Akech Aliir	5 September 2024	2-year deal (club option)	Adelaide 36ers	
Dash Daniels	13 December 2024	2-year deal (next star)	BA Centre of Excellence	

=== Subtractions ===
Player	Reason left	Date Left	New Team	Ref.
Brad Newley	Retired	13 February 2024	Frankston Blues	
Zac Triplett	Options declined	9 April 2024	Illawarra Hawks	
Malith Machar	Options declined	9 April 2024	Sandringham Sabres	
Ariel Hukporti	NBA Draft	8 July 2024	New York Knicks	
Luke Travers	Released	28 August 2024	Cleveland Cavaliers	
Jo Lual-Acuil	Free agent	14 September 2024	Liaoning Flying Leopards	

== Awards ==
=== Club awards ===
- Club MVP: Chris Goulding
- Defensive Player: Shea Ili
- SHARE Award: Shea Ili
- Melbourne United Belt: Kyle Bowen
- Bringing the Blue Podcast MVP: Shea Ili
- Vince Crivelli Club Person of the Year: Ben Stoeckel

== See also ==
- 2024–25 NBL season
- Melbourne United
