= 2024–25 S.E. Melbourne Phoenix season =

- Head coach: (United States) Josh King
- Co-captains: (Australia) Jordan Hunter (Australia) Nathan Sobey
- Arena: John Cain Arena

NBL results
- Record: 16–13 (55.2%)
- Ladder: 4th
- Finals finish: Semifinalist (lost to Hawks 1–2)
- Stats at NBL.com.au

Player records
- Points: (United States) Hurt 20.1
- Rebounds: (United States) Hurt 7.4
- Assists: (Australia) Sobey 4.7
- All statistics correct as of 5 March 2025.

The 2024–25 S.E. Melbourne Phoenix season was the 6th season of the franchise in the National Basketball League (NBL), and their first under the leadership of their new head coach Josh King.

On 13 October 2024, Mike Kelly was released as Phoenix' head coach after the team started the season with a 0–5 record and was replaced by Sam Mackinnon on an interim basis. On 22 October 2024, Josh King was appointed as Phoenix' head coach for two seasons.

== Roster ==
Note: Flags indicate national team eligibility at FIBA-sanctioned events. Players may hold other non-FIBA nationalities not displayed.

2024–25 S.E. Melbourne Phoenix roster
Players
Coaches

Pos.	No.	Nat.	Name	Ht.	Wt.
C	1	(Australia)	Hunter, Jordan (C)	2.09 m (6 ft 10 in)	109 kg (240 lb)
G	2	(Australia)	Kenyon, Matt	1.96 m (6 ft 5 in)	91 kg (201 lb)
G	5	(Australia)	Glover, Angus	1.94 m (6 ft 4 in)	90 kg (198 lb)
G	6	(Australia)	Fennell, Luke (DP)	1.97 m (6 ft 6 in)
G	10	(Australia)	Ayre, Ben	1.84 m (6 ft 0 in)	80 kg (176 lb)
G	11	(United States)	Walton, Derrick (injured) (IN)	1.83 m (6 ft 0 in)	84 kg (185 lb)
G	13	(Australia)	Rosendale, Luke	1.94 m (6 ft 4 in)
F	15	(New Zealand)	Vodanovich, Tom	2.01 m (6 ft 7 in)	104 kg (229 lb)
G	20	(Australia)	Sobey, Nathan (C)	1.90 m (6 ft 3 in)	82 kg (181 lb)
G/F	21	(United States)	Wieskamp, Joe (I)	1.98 m (6 ft 6 in)	93 kg (205 lb)
F/C	22	(United States)	Hurt, Matthew (I)	2.06 m (6 ft 9 in)	106 kg (234 lb)
C	24	(Australia)	Majok, Majok	2.10 m (6 ft 11 in)	112 kg (247 lb)
G	30	(Australia)	Foxwell, Owen	1.88 m (6 ft 2 in)	81 kg (179 lb)
F	33	(Trinidad and Tobago)	Lewis, Malique (NS)	2.03 m (6 ft 8 in)	88 kg (194 lb)

Head coach

- (United States) Josh King

Assistant coach(es)

- (Australia) Luke Brennan
- (Australia) Adam Gibson
- (Australia) Sam Mackinnon

Legend

- (C) Team captain
- (DP) Development player
- (IN) Inactive
- (I) Import player
- (SRP) Special restricted player
- (NS) Next Star player
- Injured

- Roster
Updated: 14 January 2025

=== Depth chart ===
Pos.	Starting 5	Bench 1	Bench 2
PG	Derrick Walton	Owen Foxwell	Ben Ayre
SG	Nathan Sobey	Angus Glover	Luke Fennell
SF	Joe Wieskamp	Matt Kenyon	Luke Rosendale
PF	Matthew Hurt	Malique Lewis	Tom Vodanovich
C	Jordan Hunter	Majok Majok

== Standings ==
=== Ladder ===
Pos	2024–25 NBL season											
Pos	Team	Pld	W	L	PCT	Last 5	Streak	Home	Away	PF	PA	PP
1	Illawarra Hawks	29	20	9	68.97%	4–1	W3	10–4	10–5	2941	2645	111.19%
2	Melbourne United	29	19	10	65.52%	4–1	W4	9–6	10–4	2771	2652	104.49%
3	Perth Wildcats	29	18	11	62.07%	3–2	W3	10–5	8–6	2903	2811	103.27%
4	S.E. Melbourne Phoenix	29	16	13	55.17%	2–3	L1	10–4	6–9	2787	2656	104.93%
5	Sydney Kings	29	16	13	55.17%	2–3	L3	7–7	9–6	2630	2557	102.85%
6	Adelaide 36ers	29	13	16	44.83%	2–3	L3	9–6	4–10	2736	2796	97.85%
7	Tasmania JackJumpers	29	13	16	44.83%	1–4	W1	9–5	4–11	2435	2553	95.38%
8	Brisbane Bullets	29	12	17	41.38%	2–3	L1	6–8	6–9	2678	2838	94.36%
9	New Zealand Breakers	29	10	19	34.48%	1–4	L1	6–9	4–10	2485	2650	93.77%
10	Cairns Taipans	29	8	21	27.59%	3–2	L1	4–11	4–10	2561	2769	92.49%

Updated to match(es) played on 8 February 2025. Source: NBL.com.au

The NBL tie-breaker system as outlined in the NBL Rules and Regulations states that in the case of an identical win–loss record, the overall points percentage will determine order of seeding.

=== Ladder progression ===
Leader and qualification to semifinals
Qualification to semifinals
Qualification to play-in
Last place

2024–25 NBL season
Team ╲ Round	1	2	3	4	5	6	7	8	9	10	11	12	13	14	15	16	17	18	19	20
Adelaide 36ers	8	8	6	5	5	4	4	4	4	6	9	8	8	8	8	7	7	6	6	6
Brisbane Bullets	6	10	9	9	7	8	7	8	7	9	8	7	5	7	7	8	8	8	8	8
Cairns Taipans	10	7	4	6	6	9	10	10	10	10	10	10	10	10	10	10	10	10	10	10
Illawarra Hawks	1	1	2	2	1	1	2	3	3	2	2	1	1	1	1	1	1	1	1	1
Melbourne United	2	3	5	3	4	2	3	1	1	1	1	2	2	2	2	2	3	2	2	2
New Zealand Breakers	5	2	1	1	2	3	1	2	2	3	5	9	9	9	9	9	9	9	9	9
Perth Wildcats	4	5	8	7	8	6	6	6	6	5	4	4	6	5	4	3	4	5	3	3
S.E. Melbourne Phoenix	7	9	10	10	10	10	8	7	8	7	6	6	7	6	5	5	5	4	4	4
Sydney Kings	3	4	3	4	3	5	5	5	5	4	3	3	3	4	3	4	2	3	5	5
Tasmania JackJumpers	9	6	7	8	9	7	9	9	9	8	7	5	4	3	6	6	6	7	7	7

Updated to match(es) played on 8 February 2025. Source: NBL.com.au

== Game log ==
=== Pre-season ===
2024 NBL Blitz game log
Total: 2–1 (Home: 0–1; Road: 2–0)
September: 2–1 (Home: 0–1; Road: 2–0)

Game	Date	Team	Score	High points	High rebounds	High assists	Location Attendance	Record
1	8 September	Illawarra	L 93–112	Hurt, Sobey (16)	Hunter (6)	Derrick Walton (6)	Carrara Indoor Stadium n/a	0–1
2	11 September	@ Sydney	W 101–113	Joe Wieskamp (24)	Lewis, Wieskamp (7)	Derrick Walton (7)	Gold Coast Sports Centre n/a	1–1
3	13 September	@ Adelaide	W 49–101	Ben Ayre (15)	Majok, Wieskamp (10)	Glover (5)	Gold Coast Sports Centre n/a	2–1

=== Regular season ===
2024–25 game log
Total: 16–13 (Home: 10–4; Road: 6–9)
September: 0–3 (Home: 0–1; Road: 0–2)

Game	Date	Team	Score	High points	High rebounds	High assists	Location Attendance	Record
1	20 September	@ Perth	L 106–98	Jordan Hunter (19)	Matthew Hurt (12)	Derrick Walton (8)	Perth Arena; 11,530	0–1
2	26 September	Melbourne	L 84–96	Matthew Hurt (18)	Hunter, Hurt (7)	Sobey, Walton (4)	John Cain Arena; 10,175	0–2
3	29 September	@ New Zealand	L 81–79	Nathan Sobey (24)	Hunter, Wieskamp (12)	Glover, Sobey (4)	Spark Arena; 5,783	0–3

October: 2–3 (Home: 0–2; Road: 2–1)

Game	Date	Team	Score	High points	High rebounds	High assists	Location Attendance	Record
4	3 October	@ Adelaide	L 93–83	Matthew Hurt (32)	Jordan Hunter (7)	Derrick Walton (11)	Adelaide Entertainment Centre; 9,377	0–4
5	12 October	Brisbane	L 85–87	Matthew Hurt (24)	Jordan Hunter (7)	Derrick Walton (5)	John Cain Arena; 6,521	0–5
6	20 October	@ Melbourne	W 84–93	Jordan Hunter (20)	Jordan Hunter (9)	Angus Glover (8)	John Cain Arena; 10,175	1–5
7	24 October	@ New Zealand	W 62–88	Matthew Hurt (19)	Hunter, Wieskamp (8)	Nathan Sobey (7)	Wolfbrook Arena; 3,764	2–5
8	26 October	Illawarra	L 82–88	Matthew Hurt (18)	Matthew Hurt (9)	three players (3)	John Cain Arena; 7,428	2–6

November: 4–2 (Home: 3–0; Road: 1–2)

Game	Date	Team	Score	High points	High rebounds	High assists	Location Attendance	Record
9	1 November	@ Tasmania	W 77–79	Matthew Hurt (24)	Nathan Sobey (7)	Nathan Sobey (9)	Silverdome; 3,255	3–6
10	3 November	Perth	W 100–76	Nathan Sobey (20)	Jordan Hunter (9)	Nathan Sobey (5)	John Cain Arena; 8,362	4–6
11	8 November	@ Sydney	L 74–69	Angus Glover (17)	Malique Lewis (8)	Nathan Sobey (4)	Sydney SuperDome; 8,052	4–7
12	10 November	Cairns	W 97–74	Angus Glover (22)	Hunter, Hurt (7)	Nathan Sobey (9)	John Cain Arena; 6,384	5–7
13	15 November	@ Perth	L 97–84	Matthew Hurt (27)	Matthew Hurt (10)	three players (3)	Perth Arena; 11,086	5–8
14	30 November	Illawarra	W 103–100	Jordan Hunter (23)	Jordan Hunter (6)	Owen Foxwell (7)	John Cain Arena; 6,040	6–8

December: 4–1 (Home: 3–0; Road: 1–1)

Game	Date	Team	Score	High points	High rebounds	High assists	Location Attendance	Record
15	7 December	Cairns	W 99–94	Nathan Sobey (26)	Matthew Hurt (14)	Owen Foxwell (6)	John Cain Arena; 5,103	7–8
16	12 December	@ Brisbane	L 116–108	Matthew Hurt (27)	Hurt, Lewis (5)	Angus Glover (7)	Brisbane Entertainment Centre; 3,757	7–9
17	15 December	Melbourne	W 109–97	Matthew Hurt (28)	Jordan Hunter (8)	Sobey, Walton (7)	John Cain Arena; 9,437	8–9
18	21 December	Adelaide	W 106–86	Derrick Walton (28)	Jordan Hunter (8)	Nathan Sobey (9)	John Cain Arena; 10,175	9–9
19	31 December	@ Illawarra	W 105–110	Nathan Sobey (25)	Joe Wieskamp (6)	Derrick Walton (11)	Wollongong Entertainment Centre; 5,487	10–9

January: 5–3 (Home: 3–1; Road: 2–2)

Game	Date	Team	Score	High points	High rebounds	High assists	Location Attendance	Record
20	2 January	@ Sydney	L 110–101	Nathan Sobey (23)	Matthew Hurt (11)	Sobey, Walton (4)	Sydney SuperDome; 9,139	10–10
21	5 January	@ Tasmania	W 91–105	Matthew Hurt (20)	Jordan Hunter (8)	Derrick Walton (6)	Derwent Entertainment Centre; 4,340	11–10
22	11 January	Brisbane	W 105–86	Matthew Hurt (32)	Matthew Hurt (12)	Nathan Sobey (7)	Gippsland Indoor Stadium; 3,082	12–10
23	14 January	@ Cairns	W 102–113	Matthew Hurt (33)	Jordan Hunter (18)	Owen Foxwell (5)	Cairns Convention Centre; 3,779	13–10
24	18 January	New Zealand	W 102–89	Nathan Sobey (28)	Jordan Hunter (9)	Nathan Sobey (9)	State Basketball Centre; 3,422	14–10
25	22 January	Sydney	L 92–103	Nathan Sobey (28)	Matthew Hurt (10)	Glover, Sobey (4)	State Basketball Centre; 3,422	14–11
26	25 January	Tasmania	W 116–80	Matthew Hurt (29)	Joe Wieskamp (9)	Nathan Sobey (10)	State Basketball Centre; 3,422	15–11
27	31 January	@ Perth	L 100–99	Matthew Hurt (19)	Jordan Hunter (13)	four players (3)	Perth Arena; 13,156	15–12

February: 1–1 (Home: 1–0; Road: 0–1)

Game	Date	Team	Score	High points	High rebounds	High assists	Location Attendance	Record
28	2 February	Adelaide	W 105–99	Nathan Sobey (26)	Matthew Hurt (10)	Nathan Sobey (8)	John Cain Arena; 8,230	16–12
29	8 February	@ Melbourne	L 103–93	Ben Ayre (15)	Hurt, Lewis (7)	Owen Foxwell (4)	John Cain Arena; 10,175	16–13

2024–25 season schedule

=== Postseason ===
2025 finals game log
Total: 2–3 (Home: 2–0; Road: 0–3)
Seeding qualifier: 0–1 (Home: 0–0; Road: 0–1)

Game	Date	Team	Score	High points	High rebounds	High assists	Location Attendance	Record
1	11 February	@ Perth	L 122–105	Angus Glover (25)	Jordan Hunter (6)	Nathan Sobey (8)	Perth HPC; 2,975	0–1

Play-in game: 1–0 (Home: 1–0; Road: 0–0)

Game	Date	Team	Score	High points	High rebounds	High assists	Location Attendance	Record
2	16 February	Adelaide	W 85–75	Matthew Hurt (25)	Matthew Hurt (9)	Owen Foxwell (6)	John Cain Arena; 6,118	1–1

Semifinals: 1–2 (Home: 1–0; Road: 0–2)

Game	Date	Team	Score	High points	High rebounds	High assists	Location Attendance	Series
1	28 February	@ Illawarra	L 101–94	Joe Wieskamp (22)	Nathan Sobey (9)	Derrick Walton (11)	Wollongong Entertainment Centre; 5,491	0–1
2	2 March	Illawarra	W 101–94	Matthew Hurt (30)	Jordan Hunter (9)	Angus Glover (5)	John Cain Arena; 8,636	1–1
3	5 March	@ Illawarra	L 126–96	Joe Wieskamp (25)	Hunter, Sobey (6)	Owen Foxwell (3)	Wollongong Entertainment Centre; 5,203	1–2

2025 finals schedule

== Transactions ==
=== Re-signed ===
Player	Date Signed	Contract	Ref.
Luke Rosendale	16 July 2024	1-year deal	
Owen Foxwell	19 January 2025	2-year deal	

=== Additions ===
Player	Date Signed	Contract	Former team	Ref.
Nathan Sobey	15 April 2024	2-year deal (mutual option)	Brisbane Bullets	
Angus Glover	16 April 2024	2-year deal	Sydney Kings	
Jordan Hunter	18 April 2024	3-year deal (mutual option)	Sydney Kings	
Derrick Walton	3 May 2024	1-year deal	Zhejiang Lions	
Luke Fennell	6 May 2024	1-year deal	Centre of Excellence	

=== Subtractions ===
Player	Reason left	Date Left	New team	Ref.
Anzac Rissetto	Free agent	28 March 2024	Knox Raiders	
Gorjok Gak	Free agent	18 April 2024	Tasmania JackJumpers	
Alan Williams	Mutual release	12 June 2024	Goyang Sono Skygunners	
Rhys Vague	Free agent	9 July 2024	Tokyo United	
Kody Stattmann	Free agent	11 July 2024	Cairns Taipans	
Reuben Te Rangi	Free agent	27 July 2024	Tasmania JackJumpers	
Mitch Creek	Free agent	5 November 2024	Trabzonspor	

== Awards ==
=== Club awards ===
- Club MVP: Matthew Hurt
- Clubman Award: Owen Foxwell

== See also ==
- 2024–25 NBL season
- South East Melbourne Phoenix
