= Ben Griscti =

Australian basketball player (born 2002)

No. 14 – Adelaide 36ers
- Position: Center
- League: NBL

Personal information
- Born: 4 July 2002 (age 24) Adelaide, South Australia, Australia
- Listed height: 211 cm (6 ft 11 in)
- Listed weight: 110 kg (243 lb)

Career information
- High school: Cabra Dominican College (Adelaide, Australia)
- College: Incarnate Word (2021–2023); UC Riverside (2023–2024)
- NBA draft: 2025: undrafted
- Playing career: 2019–present

Career history
- 2019; 2024–2025: Sturt Sabres
- 2024–present: Adelaide 36ers
- 2026: Nunawading Spectres

Benjamin Griscti (born 4 July 2002) is an Australian professional basketball player for the Adelaide 36ers of the National Basketball League (NBL). He played college basketball for the Incarnate Word Cardinals and UC Riverside Highlanders.

== Early career ==
Griscti was raised in Adelaide and spent his junior career with the Sturt Sabres. He played for the Sabres in the Premier League in 2019. On 15 April 2021, Griscti signed with the Incarnate Word Cardinals. He averaged 5.3 points and 3.4 rebounds during the 2022–23 season. Griscti transferred to the UC Riverside Highlanders in 2023, for whom he averaged 7.8 points and 3.3 rebounds per game during the 2023–24 season.

== Professional career ==
Griscti returned to Australia in 2024 and played for the Sabres in NBL1 Central. On 21 May 2024, he signed with his hometown Adelaide 36ers on a three-year deal. Griscti had also received interest from the Adelaide Football Club and Port Adelaide Football Club despite not playing Australian rules football since he was fifteen.

Griscti returned to the Sturt Sabres for the 2025 NBL1 Central season.

On 30 August 2025, Griscti was injured when a backboard fell on his head during a shootaround at the AIS Arena. He suffered a fractured vertebrae and was expected to miss the start of the 2025–26 NBL season.

On 18 December 2025, Griscti signed with the Nunawading Spectres for the 2026 NBL1 South season.

== National team career ==
Griscti played for the Australia national basketball team for two games in the 2025 FIBA Asia Cup qualification.
