= Darius Days =

American basketball player (born 1999)

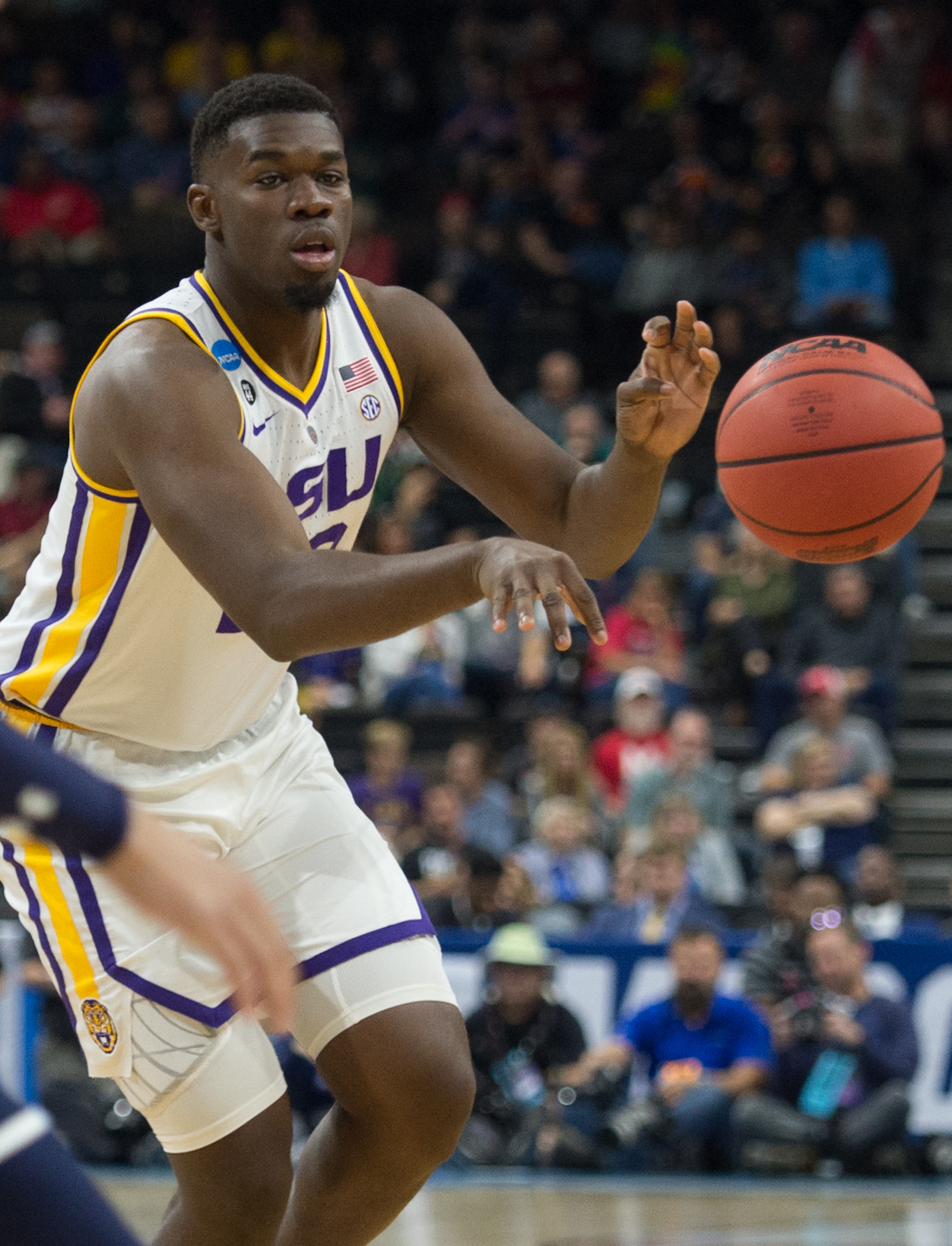
- Days with LSU in 2019

Free agent
- Position: Power forward / small forward

Personal information
- Born: October 20, 1999 (age 26) Gainesville, Florida, U.S.
- Listed height: 6 ft 7 in (2.01 m)
- Listed weight: 245 lb (111 kg)

Career information
- High school: The Rock School (Gainesville, Florida); IMG Academy (Bradenton, Florida)
- College: LSU (2018–2022)
- NBA draft: 2022: undrafted
- Playing career: 2022–present

Career history
- 2022–2023: Houston Rockets
- 2022–2023: →Rio Grande Valley Vipers
- 2023–2024: Rio Grande Valley Vipers
- 2024: Winnipeg Sea Bears
- 2024–2025: Illawarra Hawks
- 2025–2026: San-en NeoPhoenix
- 2026: TNT Tropang 5G
- 2026: Illawarra Hawks

Career highlights
- NBL champion (2025); All-NBA G League Second Team (2023); NBA G League All-Rookie Team (2023); Second-team All-SEC (2022)
- Stats at NBA.com
- Stats at Basketball Reference

Darius Days (born October 20, 1999) is an American professional basketball player who last played for the Illawarra Hawks of the Australian National Basketball League (NBL). He played college basketball for the LSU Tigers of the Southeastern Conference (SEC).

== High school career ==
Days attended Williston High School in Williston, Florida as a freshman, playing junior varsity football. For his sophomore season, he transferred to The Rock School in Gainesville, Florida and focused on basketball. As a junior, Days averaged 21 points and 10 rebounds per game, earning Gainesville Sun Small Schools Co-Player of the Year honors. He moved to IMG Academy in Bradenton, Florida for his senior season. Days committed to playing college basketball for LSU over offers from North Carolina, Louisville, Ohio State and Xavier.

== College career ==
As a freshman at LSU, Days averaged 5.3 points and four rebounds in 14.6 minutes per game. In his next year, he moved into the starting lineup. On January 8, 2020, Days recorded 16 points and 16 rebounds in a 79–77 win over Arkansas. As a sophomore, he averaged 11.1 points and 6.8 rebounds per game. Days declared for the 2020 NBA draft before withdrawing his name and returning to college. On November 26, 2020, he made his junior season debut, scoring 24 points in a 94–81 victory over SIU Edwardsville. Days missed one game with a sprained ankle. As a junior, he averaged 11.6 points and a team-leading 7.8 rebounds per game. Following the season, Days declared for the 2021 NBA draft. However, he opted to withdraw from the draft and return to LSU. Days was named to the Second Team All-SEC as a senior. He averaged 13.7 points and 7.8 rebounds per game.

== Professional career ==
=== Houston Rockets (2022–2023) ===
After going undrafted in the 2022 NBA draft, Days played for the San Antonio Spurs in the 2022 NBA Summer League. On July 16, 2022, he signed a two-way contract with the Miami Heat. On October 8, the Heat ended his two-way contract and subsequently signed him to a summer contract. The following day, he was waived by the Heat after appearing in two pre-season games.

On October 11, Days signed an Exhibit 10 deal with the Houston Rockets. Six days later, his contract was converted to a two-way contract. He split the 2022–23 season with the Rockets and the Rio Grande Valley Vipers of the NBA G League. He played four NBA games during the season.

On July 2, 2023, Days signed a second two-way contract with the Rockets. He played for them in the 2023 NBA Summer League. He was waived on October 23.

=== Rio Grande Valley Vipers (2023–2024) ===
On October 30, 2023, Days re-joined the Rio Grande Valley Vipers for the 2023–24 NBA G League season.

=== Winnipeg Sea Bears (2024) ===
On April 29, 2024, Days signed with the Winnipeg Sea Bears of the Canadian Elite Basketball League. However, he was waived on June 10.

On July 17, 2024, Days signed with the TNT Tropang Giga of the Philippine Basketball Association (PBA) as the team's import for the 2024 PBA Governors' Cup. On August 14, he was replaced by Rondae Hollis-Jefferson without appearing in a game.

=== Illawarra Hawks (2024–2025) ===
After a pre-season stint tryout with the Shanghai Sharks, Days signed with the Illawarra Hawks of the Australian National Basketball League (NBL) on September 3, 2024. On January 20, 2025, he suffered a hamstring injury in the first quarter of the Hawks' win over the Brisbane Bullets.

=== San-en NeoPhoenix (2025–2026) ===
On June 12, 2025, Days signed with San-en NeoPhoenix of the Japanese B.League. He left the team in January 2026 after averaging 12.7 points and 4.9 rebounds in 19 games.

=== TNT Tropang 5G (2026) ===
On June 6, 2026, Days signed with TNT Tropang 5G of the Philippine Basketball Association (PBA).

=== Return to Illawarra Hawks (2026) ===
On August 6, 2026, Days signed with the Illawarra Hawks for the 2026–27 NBL season, returning to the club for a second stint. After playing less than seven minutes in the season opener against the New Zealand Breakers, Days and the Hawks mutually agreed to part ways on September 24.

== Career statistics ==
Legend
GP	Games played	GS	Games started	MPG	Minutes per game
FG%	Field goal percentage	3P%	3-point field goal percentage	FT%	Free throw percentage
RPG	Rebounds per game	APG	Assists per game	SPG	Steals per game
BPG	Blocks per game	PPG	Points per game	**Bold**	Career high

=== NBA ===
==== Regular season ====
Year	Team	GP	GS	MPG	FG%	3P%	FT%	RPG	APG	SPG	BPG	PPG
2022–23	Houston	4	0	18.0	.417	.300	1.000	1.5	.3	.0	.3	3.8
Career		4	0	18.0	.417	.300	1.000	1.5	.3	.0	.3	3.8

=== College ===
Year	Team	GP	GS	MPG	FG%	3P%	FT%	RPG	APG	SPG	BPG	PPG
2018–19	LSU	**35**	3	14.6	.485	.382	.743	4.0	.4	.7	.3	5.3
2019–20	LSU	31	30	23.5	.486	.295	**.786**	6.8	.8	.6	**.3**	11.1
2020–21	LSU	28	28	27.0	**.519**	**.400**	.703	7.8	.6	1.1	.3	11.6
2021–22	LSU	33	**33**	**29.8**	.434	.350	.700	**7.8**	**.9**	**1.5**	.3	**13.7**
Career		127	94	23.4	.474	.353	.734	6.5	.7	1.0	.3	10.3

== Personal life ==
Days is the son of Tracy and Greg Days. His favorite NBA players are Draymond Green, to whom he has compared himself, and Carmelo Anthony.
