= Jackson Makoi =

South Sudanese-Australian basketball player

Rivers Hoopers
- Position: Point guard
- League: BAL

Personal information
- Born: 3 July 2000 (age 26) Egypt
- Listed height: 196 cm (6 ft 5 in)
- Listed weight: 89 kg (196 lb)

Career information
- High school: Saint Louis Christian Academy (Saint Louis, Missouri)
- College: Lee College (2019–2020); Daytona State (2020–2021)
- NBA draft: 2022: undrafted
- Playing career: 2021–present

Career history
- 2021–2022: Vrijednosnice Osijek
- 2022–2024: Sydney Kings
- 2024: Northside Wizards
- 2024–2025: Cairns Taipans
- 2025–present: Rivers Hoopers

Career highlights
- NBL champion (2023)

Anyiarbany "Jackson" Makoi (born 3 July 2000) is a South Sudanese-Australian professional basketball player for the Rivers Hoopers of the Basketball Africa League. He represents the South Sudan national basketball team in international competition.

== Early life ==
Makoi was born in Egypt, however he moved to Melbourne, Australia at an early age. He moved to the United States to play high school basketball.

== Professional career ==
On 8 September 2021, Makoi signed his first professional contract with Vrijednosnice Osijek of the Croatian HT Premijer liga.

On 21 June 2022, Makoi signed with the Sydney Kings as a development player for the 2022–23 NBL season. He played 15 games before suffering a season-ending knee injury. He re-signed with the Kings on 28 March 2023 to a two-year deal, continuing as a development player for the 2023–24 NBL season. He recovered to make one appearance for the club in his second season. On 9 April 2024, he was released by the Kings.

Makoi joined the Northside Wizards for the 2024 NBL1 North season.

On 22 April 2024, Makoi signed with the Cairns Taipans for the 2024–25 NBL season. On 31 August 2024, he received an eight match suspension with a six-week suspended sentence after being charged for driving under the influence. He missed the first two rounds of the 2024–25 season. On 11 January 2025, he was arrested and charged over domestic violence allegations from an incident in November 2023. He was subsequently stood down by the Taipans. On July 24, the domestic violence charges were withdrawn after the complainant failed to appear in court for a second time.

On March 13, 2025, Makoi joined Nigerian team Rivers Hoopers for the 2025 BAL season.

== National team career ==
Internationally, Makoi has played for the South Sudan national basketball team since 2020. He played with South Sudan at AfroBasket 2021 as the team's starting point guard. He contributed 7 points, 3 rebounds and 3 assists per game, helping the team reach the quarterfinals in its first major tournament.

Makoi was named in South Sudan's final roster for the 2024 Olympics.
