= Kyrin Galloway =

American-Australian basketball player

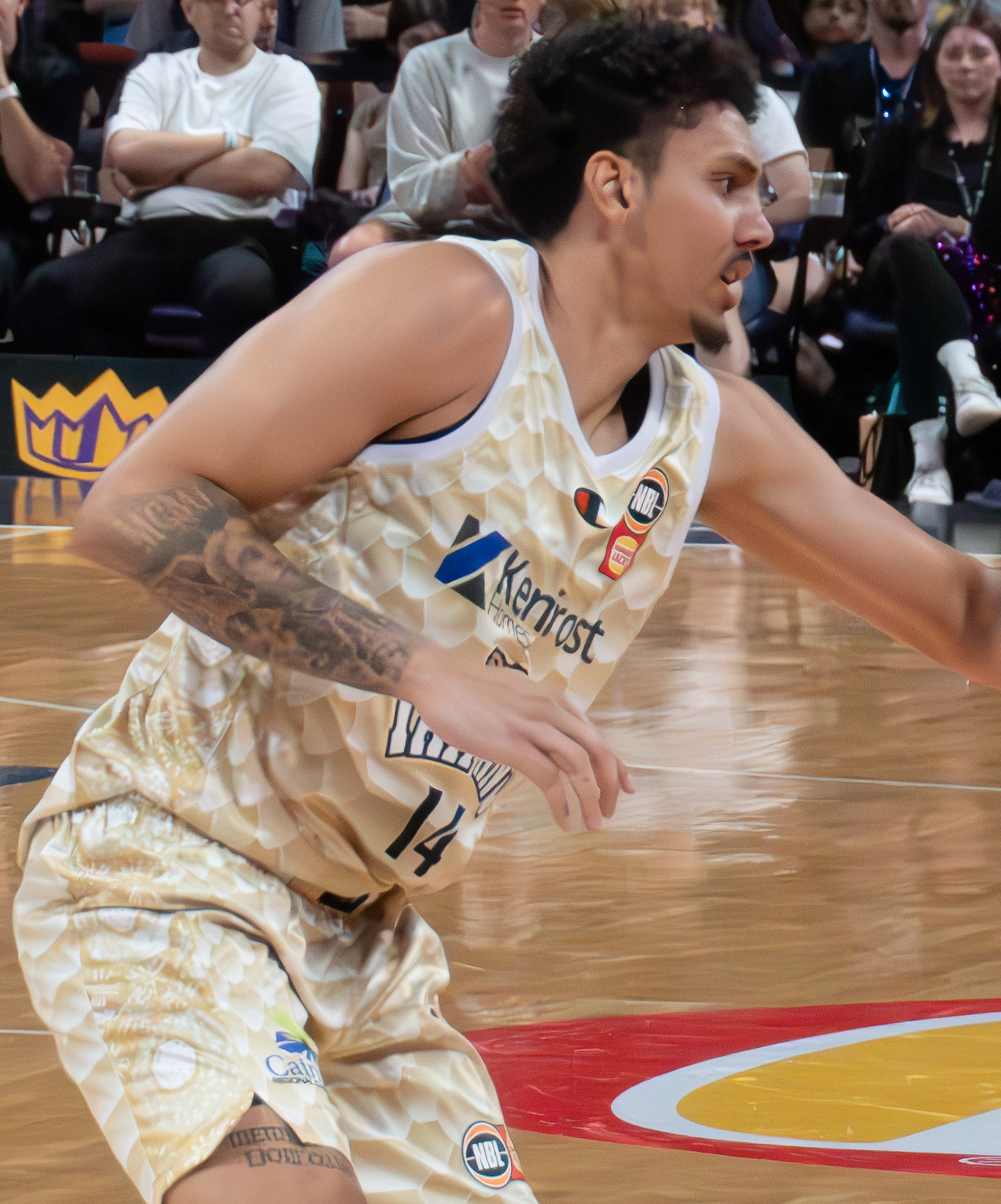
- Galloway with the Cairns Taipans in 2025

No. 14 – Cairns Taipans
- Position: Power forward
- League: NBL

Personal information
- Born: 10 July 1999 (age 27) Honolulu, Hawaii, U.S.
- Listed height: 203 cm (6 ft 8 in)
- Listed weight: 98 kg (216 lb)

Career information
- High school: Milton (Milton, Georgia)
- College: UNC Greensboro (2016–2020)
- NBA draft: 2020: undrafted
- Playing career: 2020–present

Career history
- 2020–2022: New Zealand Breakers
- 2021: Franklin Bulls
- 2022: Mackay Meteors
- 2022–2024: Adelaide 36ers
- 2023: Ipswich Force
- 2024: Townsville Heat
- 2024–present: Cairns Taipans
- 2025: Iwate Big Bulls

Career highlights
- NBL1 North champion (2023)
Medals
Men's basketball
Representing Australia
Universiade
| Bronze medal – third place | 2019 Italy | Team |

Kyrin Galloway (born 10 July 1999) is an American-Australian professional basketball player for the Cairns Taipans of the Australian National Basketball League (NBL). He played college basketball for the UNC Greensboro Spartans.

== Early life ==
Galloway grew up playing tennis and was a Roger Federer fan, only picking up basketball around age 14.

== High school career ==
Galloway attended Milton High School. As a senior, he averaged 14 points, 10 rebounds, and 4 blocks per game. Galloway was named to the All-Region team and led Milton to a 2016 Final Four appearance.

== College career ==
As a freshman, Galloway posted 2.2 points and 2.2 rebounds per game off the bench. He averaged 5.7 points and 4.4 rebounds per game as a sophomore. On 9 November 2018, Galloway scored a career-high 32 points in a 97-91 loss to LSU. He averaged 9.4 points and 4.3 rebounds per game as a junior. As a senior, Galloway averaged 8.6 points, 4.1 rebounds and a Southern Conference-leading 1.7 blocks per game, shooting 39.8 percent from the field.

== Professional career ==
On 14 July 2020, Galloway signed a three-year deal with the New Zealand Breakers of the Australian National Basketball League, with the first season as a developmental player and the next two as a fully contracted player. On 5 June 2021, he was added to the roster of the Franklin Bulls of the New Zealand league. In his first game, Galloway posted 22 points, 14 rebounds and four assists in a 118–86 loss to the Manawatu Jets.

Following the 2021–22 NBL season, Galloway played for the Mackay Meteors of the NBL1 North.

On 26 May 2022, Galloway signed a two-year deal with the Adelaide 36ers.

In the 2023 NBL1 North season, Galloway helped the Ipswich Force reach the grand final series, where they defeated the Gold Coast Rollers 2–1 to win the championship.

In the 2023–24 NBL season, Galloway averaged 5.7 points, 3.4 rebounds and finished seventh overall in the NBL for blocks, earning himself the 36ers' Most Improved Player award.

Galloway joined the Townsville Heat for the 2024 NBL1 North season.

On 29 April 2024, Galloway signed a two-year deal with the Cairns Taipans.

On 21 February 2025, Galloway signed with the Iwate Big Bulls of the B.League.

On 27 March 2025, Galloway's mutual option with the Taipans was exercised for the 2025–26 NBL season.

On 20 June 2026, Galloway re-signed with the Taipans for the 2026–27 NBL season.

== National team career ==
Galloway has represented Australia in several international tournaments. In 2019, he helped Australia win bronze at the Summer Universiade in Italy.

== Personal life ==
Galloway has an American father Erin and an Australian mother Kylie. Both his parents played basketball collegiately at the University of Hawaii, after his mother transferred from San Jose State. His mother played professionally in Townsville. His brother, Jaylin, is also a basketball player.
