= 2024 NBL pre-season =

Pre-season basketball tournament

2024 NBL Blitz logo

The pre-season of the 2024–25 NBL season, the 47th season of Australia's National Basketball League, will begin on 17 August to 10 October 2024.

== Pre-season games ==
17 August 2024	Illawarra Hawks	101–88	Shanghai Sharks	Beaton Park Stadium, Wollongong
17:30	Scoring by quarter: 26–25, 28–23, 24–24, 23–16
NBL TV	Pts: Froling 22; Rebs: Blanchfield, Olbrich 7 Asts: Harvey 5	boxscore report	Pts: Days 22; Rebs: Dai Hao 6 Asts: Yuen Tongman 6	Attendance: n/a

23 August 2024	Brisbane Bullets	94–75	Shanghai Sharks	Nissan Arena, Brisbane
18:30	Scoring by quarter: 31–21, 21–15, 28–26, 14–13
NBL TV	Pts: Harrison 18; Rebs: Harrison 10; Asts: Adel 6	boxscore report	Pts: Liu Zheng 21; Rebs: Wang Zhelin 10; Asts: Liu, Yuen 4	Attendance: n/a

23 August 2024	Perth Wildcats	118–100	NBL1 West	Morley Recreation Centre, Perth
19:00	Scoring by quarter: 32–21, 25–32, 33–16, 28–31
NBL TV	Pts: Pepper 22; Rebs: Doolittle 7 Asts: Webster 5	boxscore report	Pts: Turnage 17; Rebs: Narkle 7 Asts: Nelson 7	Attendance: 350

25 August 2024	Perth Wildcats	131–108	NBL1 West	Lakeside Recreation Centre, Perth
17:00	Scoring by quarter: 34–27, 39–23, 28–24, 30–34
NBL TV	Pts: Okwera 24; Rebs: Okwera 9 Asts: Henshall 7	boxscore report	Pts: Nelson 18; Rebs: Davey 8 Asts: Parsons 3	Attendance: n/a

27 August 2024	Melbourne United	75–90	Brisbane Bullets	Casey Stadium, Melbourne
18:30	Scoring by quarter: 27–20, 9–22, 13–26, 26–22
NBL TV	Pts: Krebs 11; Rebs: Loe 7 Asts: Foxwell, Ili 3	boxscore report	Pts: Adel 24; Rebs: Zikarsky 8 Asts: Batemon 5	Attendance: n/a

29 August 2024	S.E. Melbourne Phoenix	86–92	Brisbane Bullets	Wangaratta Sports & Aquatic Centre, Wangaratta
19:30	Scoring by quarter: 12–25, 28–20, 23–17, 23–30
NBL TV	Pts: Lewis 15; Rebs: three players 5 Asts: Walton 8	boxscore report	Pts: Harrison 24; Rebs: Harrison 11; Asts: Batemon 8	Attendance: 1,100

30 August 2024	Sydney Kings	120–76	New Zealand Breakers	State Sports Centre, Sydney
19:30	Scoring by quarter: 29–16, 31–16, 29–24, 31–20
NBL TV	Pts: Noi 19; Rebs: Oliver 9 Asts: Bruce 10	boxscore report	Pts: King 22; Rebs: Gillespie, King 5 Asts: Jackson-Cartwright 6	Attendance: 400

31 August 2024	S.E. Melbourne Phoenix	120–121(2OT)	Melbourne United	State Basketball Centre, Melbourne
19:00	Scoring by quarter: 30–23, 11–28, 25–18, 30–27, Overtime: 14–14, 10–11
NBL TV	Pts: Vodanovich 32; Rebs: Majok 8 Asts: Ayre 5	boxscore report	Pts: Ili 26; Rebs: Lee 14; Asts: Ili 5	Attendance: 2,953

4 September 2024	Adelaide 36ers	97–96	Brisbane Bullets	Wulanda Convention Centre, Mount Gambier
19:30	Scoring by quarter: 24–15, 21–29, 26–24, 26–28
NBL TV	Pts: Davis 25; Rebs: Mayen 7 Asts: Davis 6	boxscore report	Pts: Smith-Milner 19; Rebs: Zikarsky 10; Asts: White 3	Attendance: 1,200

== NBL Blitz ==
The 2024 NBL Blitz is an annual pre-season tournament featuring all teams. All games will takeplace in Gold Coast, Queensland for a second consecutive year.

This season all games will be played at the Carrara Indoor Stadium and the Gold Coast Sports Centre from 7 to 14 September 2024.

=== Blitz ladder ===
Pos	Team	Pld	W	L	PF	PA	PP	BP	Pts
1	Brisbane Bullets (C)	3	3	0	285	262	108.8	6.5	15.5
2	Perth Wildcats	3	3	0	295	271	108.9	5	14
3	Sydney Kings	3	2	1	290	269	107.8	8	14
4	S.E. Melbourne Phoenix	3	2	1	307	262	117.2	7.5	13.5
5	Melbourne United	3	2	1	304	298	102.0	7	13
6	Adelaide 36ers	3	2	1	243	256	94.9	5	11
7	Illawarra Hawks	3	1	2	305	297	102.7	7.5	10.5
8	New Zealand Breakers	3	0	3	272	296	91.9	6.5	6.5
9	Cairns Taipans	4	0	4	322	367	87.7	4	4
10	Tasmania JackJumpers	2	0	2	140	185	75.7	3	3

Updated to match(es) played on 14 September 2024. Source: nblblitz.com.au
(C) Champions

=== Games ===
7 September 2024	Tasmania JackJumpers	76–89	Brisbane Bullets	Carrara Indoor Stadium, Gold Coast
17:00	Scoring by quarter: 19–29, 22–17, 16–26, 19–17
Kayo Sports	Pts: Crawford 15; Rebs: Krslovic 7 Asts: Crawford, Nunn 4	boxscore report	Pts: Batemon 20; Rebs: Prather 5 Asts: three players 3	Attendance: n/a

7 September 2024	Melbourne United	94–87	Cairns Taipans	Carrara Indoor Stadium, Gold Coast
19:30	Scoring by quarter: 23–27, 26–22, 21–15, 24–23
Kayo Sports	Pts: Clark 16; Rebs: Loe 12; Asts: Ili 5	boxscore report	Pts: Edwards 24; Rebs: three players 8 Asts: Bradshaw 4	Attendance: n/a

8 September 2024	S.E. Melbourne Phoenix	93–112	Illawarra Hawks	Carrara Indoor Stadium, Gold Coast
13:00	Scoring by quarter: 25–24, 29–38, 23–27, 16–23
Kayo Sports	Pts: Hurt, Sobey 16; Rebs: Hunter 6 Asts: Walton 6	boxscore report	Pts: Hickey 20; Rebs: Lee, Olbrich 5 Asts: Harvey, Hickey 4	Attendance: n/a

8 September 2024	Perth Wildcats	108–102	New Zealand Breakers	Carrara Indoor Stadium, Gold Coast
15:30	Scoring by quarter: 20–23, 26–32, 21–25, 41–21
Kayo Sports	Pts: Cotton 31; Rebs: Pinder 8 Asts: Harris 5	boxscore report	Pts: Jackson-Cartwright 21; Rebs: Bolden 10; Asts: Mooney 5	Attendance: n/a

9 September 2024	Adelaide 36ers	96–64	Tasmania JackJumpers	Gold Coast Sports Centre, Gold Coast
17:00	Scoring by quarter: 31–15, 18–22, 24–14, 23–13
Kayo Sports	Pts: Vasiljevic 22; Rebs: Dech 7 Asts: Davis 5	boxscore report	Pts: Doyle 16; Rebs: Brown 8 Asts: Crawford 4	Attendance: n/a

9 September 2024	Cairns Taipans	77–99	Sydney Kings	Gold Coast Sports Centre, Gold Coast
19:30	Scoring by quarter: 23–27, 22–29, 14–19, 18–24
Kayo Sports	Pts: Groves 15; Rebs: Groves 11; Asts: Makoi 6	boxscore report	Pts: Le'afa 21; Rebs: Oliver 12; Asts: Bruce 8	Attendance: n/a

10 September 2024	Brisbane Bullets	111–104	Melbourne United	Gold Coast Sports Centre, Gold Coast
17:00	Scoring by quarter: 30–25, 30–24, 27–28, 24–27
Kayo Sports	Pts: Harrison 21; Rebs: Harrison 10; Asts: Batemon 6	boxscore report	Pts: Clark 23; Rebs: White 13; Asts: Ili 6	Attendance: n/a

10 September 2024	Illawarra Hawks	93–98	Perth Wildcats	Gold Coast Sports Centre, Gold Coast
19:30	Scoring by quarter: 16–30, 25–17, 21–21, 31–30
Kayo Sports	Pts: Henshall 18; Rebs: Henshall 10; Asts: three players 4	boxscore report	Pts: Harvey 16; Rebs: Days, Hickey 7 Asts: Kell 5	Attendance: n/a

11 September 2024	New Zealand Breakers	91–98	Adelaide 36ers	Gold Coast Sports Centre, Gold Coast
17:00	Scoring by quarter: 22–28, 29–16, 17–34, 23–20
Kayo Sports	Pts: Jackson-Cartwright 21; Rebs: McCarron, Mennenga 5 Asts: Jackson-Cartwright 8	boxscore report	Pts: Davis 23; Rebs: Humphries 11; Asts: Davis 4	Attendance: n/a

11 September 2024	Sydney Kings	101–113	S.E. Melbourne Phoenix	Gold Coast Sports Centre, Gold Coast
19:30	Scoring by quarter: 36–31, 32–32, 20–26, 13–24
Kayo Sports	Pts: Toohey 26; Rebs: three players 6 Asts: Le'afa 6	boxscore report	Pts: Wieskamp 24; Rebs: Lewis, Wieskamp 7 Asts: Walton 7	Attendance: n/a

12 September 2024	Melbourne United	106–100	Illawarra Hawks	Gold Coast Sports Centre, Gold Coast
17:00	Scoring by quarter: 25–31, 27–19, 22–29, 32–21
Kayo Sports	Pts: White 24; Rebs: Loe, White 9 Asts: Ili 9	boxscore report	Pts: three players 22; Rebs: Days 10; Asts: Hickey 7	Attendance: n/a

12 September 2024	Cairns Taipans	76–89	Perth Wildcats	Gold Coast Sports Centre, Gold Coast
19:30	Scoring by quarter: 22–13, 19–19, 20–31, 15–26
Kayo Sports	Pts: Edwards 16; Rebs: Groves 9 Asts: Bradshaw 4	boxscore report	Pts: Webster 16; Rebs: Almansa 8 Asts: Webster 5	Attendance: n/a

13 September 2024	Adelaide 36ers	49–101	S.E. Melbourne Phoenix	Gold Coast Sports Centre, Gold Coast
17:00	Scoring by quarter: 14–24, 13–27, 11–26, 11–24
Kayo Sports	Pts: Marshall 14; Rebs: Marshall 8 Asts: Rasmussen, Starling 2	boxscore report	Pts: Ayre 15; Rebs: Majok, Wieskamp 10; Asts: Glover 5	Attendance: n/a

13 September 2024	Sydney Kings	90–79	New Zealand Breakers	Gold Coast Sports Centre, Gold Coast
19:30	Scoring by quarter: 23–23, 17–21, 22–21, 28–14
Kayo Sports	Pts: Toohey 24; Rebs: three players 5 Asts: Bruce 4	boxscore report	Pts: Mooney 25; Rebs: Gillespie, Mennenga 5 Asts: Mooney 8	Attendance: n/a

14 September 2024	Brisbane Bullets	85–82	Cairns Taipans	Gold Coast Sports Centre, Gold Coast
14:30	Scoring by quarter: 26–20, 26–20, 18–27, 15–15
Kayo Sports	Pts: Cook 20; Rebs: Harrison, Prather 7 Asts: Batemon 4	boxscore report	Pts: Antonio, Stith 16; Rebs: Gak 7 Asts: Dufelmeier 5	Attendance: n/a

=== Awards ===
The winning team will be awarded the Loggins-Bruton Cup, while the tournament’s most outstanding player will take home the Ray Borner Award.

- Loggins-Bruton Cup: Brisbane Bullets
- Most Valuable Player (Ray Borner Medal): Tyrell Harrison (Brisbane Bullets)

== NBLxNBA games ==
The pre-season also featured the New Zealand Breakers to play games between NBA teams, this will be the sixth NBLxNBA tour.

4 October 2024	New Zealand Breakers	87–116	Utah Jazz	Delta Center, Salt Lake City
19:00	Scoring by quarter: 29–29, 18–34, 23–27, 17–26
NBL TV	Pts: Jackson-Cartwright 19; Rebs: López 7 Asts: Jackson-Cartwright 9	boxscore report	Pts: Juzang 19; Rebs: Kessler 9 Asts: Collier 6	Attendance: 14,121

7 October 2024	New Zealand Breakers	84–139	Philadelphia 76ers	Wells Fargo Center, Philadelphia
19:00	Scoring by quarter: 19–40, 26–42, 23–31, 16–26
NBL TV	Pts: Jackson-Cartwright 26; Rebs: Gillespie 6 Asts: McCarron 3	boxscore report	Pts: four players (15); Rebs: Drummond, McCain 7 Asts: Dowtin Jr. 6	Attendance: 19,767

10 October 2024	New Zealand Breakers	89–117	Oklahoma City Thunder	BOK Center, Tulsa
20:00	Scoring by quarter: 36–34, 24–26, 16–24, 13–33
NBL TV	Pts: Mooney 19; Rebs: Gillespie 8 Asts: Jackson-Cartwright 8	boxscore report	Pts: Flagler 25; Rebs: Jones 13; Asts: Dieng 9
