= NBLxNBA =

Annual basketball series

NBLxNBA is a series involving clubs from the National Basketball League (NBL) of Australia and New Zealand and the National Basketball Association (NBA) of the United States and Canada. The series started in 2017 for each league's 2017–18 season, and each season includes between two and seven games. The games have always been held in the U.S. and Canada, and typically are held during September and early October.

== Seasons ==
=== 2017–18 season ===
In 2017 the NBL announced that the Brisbane Bullets, Melbourne United and the Sydney Kings would compete in games against three NBA teams in the inaugural NBLxNBA series.

Despite losing all three games (including a one-point thriller), the series was marked as a success for the NBL as it brought in much higher television ratings than the teams were used to, and it showed how competitive the league is. The series also drew the attention of multiple high-profile NBA players, including Australian Ben Simmons who expressed his interest in competing in a future NBLxNBA game.

ESPN2

2 October 2017
19:00

boxscore

Sydney Kings	83–108	Utah Jazz
Scoring by quarter: 16–35, 31–23, 13–19, 23–31
Pts: Ellis 19; Rebs: Blanchfield 9 Asts: Leslie 3		Pts: Hood 18; Rebs: Gobert 10; Asts: Ingles 5

Vivint Smart Home Arena, Salt Lake City
Attendance: 15,692
Referees: Marc Davis, Kevin Scott, Randy Richardson

ESPN

8 October 2017
14:00

boxscore

Melbourne United	85–86	Oklahoma City Thunder
Scoring by quarter: 30–27, 14–22, 22–21, 19–16
Pts: Ware 20; Rebs: Prather 10; Asts: Wesley 5		Pts: George 22; Rebs: Adams 10; Asts: Westbrook 7

Chesapeake Energy Arena, Oklahoma City
Attendance: n/a
Referees: James Capers, Eric Dalen, Lauren Holtkamp

ESPN

13 October 2017
19:00

boxscore

Brisbane Bullets	93–114	Phoenix Suns
Scoring by quarter: 12–38, 33–33, 23–20, 25–23
Pts: Trice 20; Rebs: Kickert 10; Asts: Trice 5		Pts: Booker 31; Rebs: Bender, Chandler 9 Asts: Booker 6

Talking Stick Resort Arena, Phoenix
Attendance: 8,297
Referees: Derek Richardson, Mark Ayotte, Ron Garretson

=== 2018–19 season ===
The NBL announced a second series on 27 June 2018, with five of their eight clubs travelling to the United States of America to complete in seven games. The clubs which didn't complete were the Brisbane Bullets, Cairns Taipans and Illawarra Hawks.

The Adelaide 36ers reached the highest score by the NBL teams and fell one point short of the elusive 100 points milestone, but the NBL teams failed to record a victory for a second year in a row.

ESPN

28 September 2018
19:00

boxscore

Melbourne United	84–104	Philadelphia 76ers
Scoring by quarter: 21–34, 21–22, 22–25, 20–23
Pts: Pledger, Ware 19; Rebs: Pledger 13; Asts: Ware 5		Pts: Embiid 20; Rebs: Embiid 10; Asts: Simmons 14

Wells Fargo Center, Philadelphia
Attendance: n/a
Referees: Ed Malloy, Mark Lindsay, Aaron Smith

ESPN2

29 September 2018
19:00

boxscore

Perth Wildcats	72–130	Utah Jazz
Scoring by quarter: 13–44, 21–31, 11–25, 27–30
Pts: Cotton 14; Rebs: Vague 7 Asts: Kay 3		Pts: Allen 19; Rebs: Bradley, Gobert 9 Asts: Exum 6

Vivint Smart Home Arena, Salt Lake City
Attendance: 17,685
Referees: Rodney Mott, Tre Maddox, Brett Nansel

ESPN2

30 September 2018
15:30

boxscore

Sydney Kings	91–110	Los Angeles Clippers
Scoring by quarter: 17–28, 37–31, 18–23, 19–28
Pts: Randle 25; Rebs: Lisch 9 Asts: Lisch 6		Pts: Harris 20; Rebs: Harris 11; Asts: three players 5

Stan Sheriff Center, Honolulu
Attendance: 6,911
Referees: James Capers, Gary Zielinski, Karl Lane

ESPN2

3 October 2018
19:00

boxscore

New Zealand Breakers	86–91	Phoenix Suns
Scoring by quarter: 20–28, 22–24, 20–25, 24–14
Pts: Webster 27; Rebs: Long 10; Asts: Webster 7		Pts: Ayton 21; Rebs: Ayton 16; Asts: Ariza 6

Talking Stick Resort Arena, Phoenix
Attendance: 7,183
Referees: Bill Kennedy, CJ Washington, Scott Twardoski

9Go!

5 October 2018
19:00

boxscore

Adelaide 36ers	99–129	Utah Jazz
Scoring by quarter: 31–28, 23–38, 32–28, 13–35
Pts: Sobey 23; Rebs: Drmic 9 Asts: three players 4		Pts: Mitchell 18; Rebs: Udoh 10; Asts: Ingles 7

Vivint Smart Home Arena, Salt Lake City
Attendance: 18,074
Referees: Mark Ayotte, Gary Zielinski, CJ Washington

ESPN2

5 October 2018
19:00

boxscore

Melbourne United	82–120	Toronto Raptors
Scoring by quarter: 17–23, 22–34, 19–44, 24–19
Pts: Goulding, Ware 17; Rebs: Boone 11; Asts: Ware 5		Pts: Powell 21; Rebs: Ibaka 12; Asts: Wright 5

Scotiabank Arena, Toronto
Attendance: 15,781
Referees: Matt Boland, Eric Dalen, Sean Corbin

ESPN2

5 October 2018
19:00

boxscore

Perth Wildcats	88–96	Denver Nuggets
Scoring by quarter: 16–27, 25–24, 29–24, 18–21
Pts: Cotton 33; Rebs: Kay 8 Asts: Norton 4		Pts: Morris 15; Rebs: Millsap 9 Asts: Morris 9

Pepsi Center, Denver
Attendance: 9,812
Referees: Josh Tiven, Jason Goldenberg, Nick Buchert

=== 2019–20 season ===
On July 4, 2019, it was announced that the Adelaide 36ers, Melbourne United and the New Zealand Breakers would play the Utah Jazz, Memphis Grizzlies, Oklahoma City Thunder, Los Angeles Clippers and Sacramento Kings in the 2019 edition of NBLxNBA. The series was pushed closer towards the start of the NBA season, which meant the Adelaide 36ers and New Zealand Breakers missed the beginning of the NBL season, and Melbourne United missed a fortnight of the early rounds of the season.

Despite the NBL losing streak continuing, this series marked the first time an NBL team reached the 100 point mark against an NBA team. This happened in both Melbourne United games against the Los Angeles Clippers and Sacramento Kings.

SBS on Demand

5 October 2019
19:00

boxscore
report

Adelaide 36ers	81–133	Utah Jazz
Scoring by quarter: 18–28, 21–32, 24–44, 18–29
Pts: Randle 18; Rebs: Froling 11; Asts: Dillon 4		Pts: Bradley 18; Rebs: Bradley 10; Asts: Ingles, O'Neale 6

Vivint Smart Home Arena, Salt Lake City
Attendance: 18,306
Referees: Derek Richardson, Ken Mauer, Phenizee Ransom

SBS on Demand

8 October 2019
19:00

boxscore
report

New Zealand Breakers	94–108	Memphis Grizzlies
Scoring by quarter: 14–27, 22–28, 29–22, 29–31
Pts: Webster 19; Rebs: Hopson 8 Asts: Webster 8		Pts: Jackson Jr., Allen 18; Rebs: Clarke 12; Asts: Morant 10

FedExForum, Memphis
Attendance: 10,259
Referees: Derrick Collins, Michael Smith, CJ Washington

SBS on Demand

10 October 2019
19:00

boxscore
report

New Zealand Breakers	84–110	Oklahoma City Thunder
Scoring by quarter: 15–29, 20–33, 22–28, 27–20
Pts: Loe 19; Rebs: Hopson, Majok 6 Asts: Hampton, Henry 5		Pts: Adams 19; Rebs: Adams 10; Asts: Schroder 6

Chesapeake Energy Arena, Oklahoma City
Attendance: n/a
Referees: Derrick Collins, Brett Nansel, Michael Smith

SBS on Demand

13 October 2019
12:30

boxscore
report

Melbourne United	100–118	Los Angeles Clippers
Scoring by quarter: 24–18, 27–29, 20–43, 29–28
Pts: Trimble 22; Rebs: Long 9 Asts: Trimble 6		Pts: Harrell 22; Rebs: Zubac 8 Asts: Williams 7

STAPLES Center, Los Angeles
Attendance: 10,181
Referees: Brandon Adair, Tre Maddox, Bill Spooner

SBS on Demand

16 October 2019
19:00

boxscore
report

Melbourne United	110–124	Sacramento Kings
Scoring by quarter: 28–31, 21–29, 23–39, 38–25
Pts: Goulding 25; Rebs: Long 15; Asts: Trimble 6		Pts: Bagley III 30; Rebs: Bagley III 14; Asts: Ferrell, Hield 6

Golden 1 Center, Sacramento
Attendance: 10,534
Referees: J.T. Orr, CJ Washington, Sean Wright

=== 2022–23 season ===
After a 3-year hiatus due to the COVID-19 pandemic, it was announced that the Adelaide 36ers would take on the Phoenix Suns and Oklahoma City Thunder in October 2022. The series saw the first NBL win over an NBA team, with the 36ers beating the Suns 134–124 in Arizona on 3 October 2022.

2 October 2022
21:00

boxscore

Adelaide 36ers	134–124	Phoenix Suns
Scoring by quarter: 33–28, 38–31, 25–31, 38–34
Pts: Randall II 35; Rebs: McCarron 9 Asts: McCarron 16		Pts: Payne 23; Rebs: Bridges 7 Asts: Paul 12

Footprint Center, Phoenix
Attendance: 15,152
Referees: Bill Kennedy, Justin Van Duyne, Dannica Mosher

6 October 2022
20:00

boxscore

Adelaide 36ers	98–131	Oklahoma City Thunder
Scoring by quarter: 16–35, 27–38, 27–35, 28–23
Pts: Randall II 27; Rebs: Franks 7 Asts: Randall II 8		Pts: Mann 26; Rebs: Williams 12; Asts: Giddey, Williams 6

Paycom Center, Oklahoma City
Attendance: n/a
Referees: Pat Fraher, Derrick Collins, Jenna Schroeder

=== 2023–24 season ===
In August 2023, it was announced that the Cairns Taipans and New Zealand Breakers will compete in the series in October 2023. The Taipans took on the Washington Wizards and the Toronto Raptors in their NBLxNBA series debut, while the Breakers played the Portland Trail Blazers and Utah Jazz.

Kayo Freebies

10 October 2023
19:00

boxscore
report

Cairns Taipans	82–145	Washington Wizards
Scoring by quarter: 23–44, 23–38, 22–34, 14–29
Pts: Gak 17; Rebs: Roberts 10; Asts: Armstrong 8		Pts: Kuzma 22; Rebs: Gafford 8 Asts: Wright 6

Capital One Arena, Washington, D.C.
Attendance: 6,856
Referees: Bill Kennedy, Marat Kogut, Tyler Mirkovich

NBA League Pass

10 October 2023
19:00

boxscore
report

New Zealand Breakers	66–106	Portland Trail Blazers
Scoring by quarter: 23–23, 16–25, 11–20, 16–38
Pts: Jackson-Cartwright 19; Rebs: Cheatham 10; Asts: Cheatham 4		Pts: Simons 14; Rebs: Brown 8 Asts: Henderson 6

Moda Center, Portland
Attendance: 12,694
Referees: Justin Van Duyne, Mousa Dagher, John Butler

Kayo Freebies

15 October 2023
18:00

boxscore
report

Cairns Taipans	93–134	Toronto Raptors
Scoring by quarter: 17–38, 27–33, 39–33, 10–30
Pts: Miller 22; Rebs: Roberts 9 Asts: Payton 7		Pts: Freeman-Liberty 15; Rebs: Boucher 8 Asts: Siakam 5

Scotiabank Arena, Toronto
Attendance: 18,141
Referees: Courtney Kirkland, Eric Dalen, Robert Hussey

Kayo Freebies

16 October 2023
19:00

boxscore
report

New Zealand Breakers	94–114	Utah Jazz
Scoring by quarter: 11–31, 32–28, 22–25, 29–30
Pts: Lamb 23; Rebs: Lamb 7 Asts: Jackson-Cartwright 6		Pts: Markkanen 15; Rebs: Markkanen 7 Asts: Juzang 4

Delta Center, Salt Lake City
Attendance: 14,190
Referees: J.T. Orr, Gediminas Petraitis, Jenna Reneau

=== 2024–25 season ===
On 10 July 2024, the New Zealand Breakers announced their series of NBLxNBA games against the Utah Jazz and the Oklahoma City Thunder. A third game against the Philadelphia 76ers was later added on 23 September.

NBA League Pass

4 October 2024
19:00

boxscore
report

New Zealand Breakers	87–116	Utah Jazz
Scoring by quarter: 29–29, 18–34, 23–27, 17–26
Pts: Jackson-Cartwright 16; Rebs: López 7 Asts: Jackson-Cartwright 9		Pts: Juzang 19; Rebs: Kessler 9 Asts: Collier 6

Delta Center, Salt Lake City
Attendance: 14,121
Referees: Tony Brothers, Karl Lane, Chelisa Painter

NBA League Pass

7 October 2024
19:00

boxscore
report

New Zealand Breakers	84–139	Philadelphia 76ers
Scoring by quarter: 19–40, 26–42, 23–31, 16–26
Pts: Jackson-Cartwright 26; Rebs: Gillespie 6 Asts: McCarron 3		Pts: four players 15; Rebs: Drummond, McCain 9 each Asts: Dowtin 6

Wells Fargo Center, Philadelphia
Attendance: 19,767
Referees: Scott Twardoski, Gediminas Petraitis, Pat O'Connell

NBA League Pass

10 October 2024
20:00

boxscore
report

New Zealand Breakers	89–117	Oklahoma City Thunder
Scoring by quarter: 36–34, 24–26, 16–24, 13–33
Pts: Mooney 19; Rebs: Gillespie 8 Asts: Jackson-Cartwright 8		Pts: Flagler 25; Rebs: Jones 13; Asts: Dieng 9

BOK Center, Tulsa
Attendance: n/a
Referees: Mark Lindsay, Brandon Adair, Ashley Moyer-Gleich

=== 2025–26 season ===
On 11 March 2025, the National Basketball Association, National Basketball League and the Victoria State Government announced that the New Orleans Pelicans would play two exhibition games at Rod Laver Arena in Melbourne, Victoria, Australia against Melbourne United and the South East Melbourne Phoenix as part of the NBAxNBL: Melbourne Series. This will mark the first time an NBA team has played in Australia, and the first time that the South East Melbourne Phoenix have played against an NBA team.

10 Drama

3 October 2025
19:30

boxscore
report

Melbourne United	97–107	New Orleans Pelicans
Scoring by quarter: 24–35, 27–27, 28–23, 18–22
Pts: Doyle 25; Rebs: Delany 9 Asts: Walker 5		Pts: Murphy 18; Rebs: Missi 8 Asts: Williamson 5

Rod Laver Arena, Melbourne
Attendance: 14,880
Referees: Brian Forte, Jason Goldenberg, Brandon Adair

Network 10

5 October 2025
14:00

boxscore
report

S.E. Melbourne Phoenix	92–127	New Orleans Pelicans
Scoring by quarter: 21–35, 34–39, 20–25, 17–28
Pts: Hunter 17; Rebs: Brown 7 Asts: Sobey 5		Pts: Bey 21; Rebs: Williamson 9 Asts: Alvarado, Poole 4

Rod Laver Arena, Melbourne
Attendance: 15,164
Referees: Brian Forte, Jason Goldenberg, Brandon Adair

== See also ==
- National Basketball League (Australia)
- National Basketball Association
- List of games played between NBA and international teams
