= 2025 NBL Finals =

Australasian basketball tournament

Team	Coach	Wins
Illawarra Hawks	Justin Tatum	3
Melbourne United	Dean Vickerman	2
- Country: Australia
- Dates: 11 February – 23 March
- Season: 2024–25
- Teams: 6
- Defending champions: Tasmania JackJumpers (did not qualify)
- MVP: Matthew Dellavedova (Melbourne)
- Semifinalists: Perth Wildcats; S.E. Melbourne Phoenix
- Matches played: 14
- Attendance: 97,795 (6,985 per match)
- Scoring leader: Ian Clark 18.2
- All statistics correct as of 23 March 2025.

The 2025 NBL Finals was the postseason tournament of the National Basketball League's 2024–25 season.

As Australia and New Zealand participated in 2025 FIBA Asia Cup qualification, the league took a break during the FIBA international window of 17–25 February 2025.

== Format ==
The finals will be played in February and March 2025 between the top six teams of the regular season, consisting of three play-in games, two best-of-three semifinal series and the best-of-five Grand Final series, where the highest seed hosted the first, third and fifth games.

The top two seeds in the regular season automatically qualified to the semifinals. Teams ranked three to six competed in the play-in tournament. The third seed played the fourth seed for third spot and the loser played the winner of fifth or sixth for the fourth seed.

== Qualification ==
=== Qualified teams ===
Team	Date of qualification	Round of qualification	Finals appearance	Previous appearance	Previous best performance	Ref.
Illawarra Hawks	21 January 2025	17	24th	2024	Champions (2001)	
Melbourne United	26 January 2025	18	29th	2024	Champions (1993, 1997, 2006, 2008, 2018, 2021)	
Sydney Kings	26 January 2025	18	19th	2024	Champions (2003, 2004, 2005, 2022, 2023)	
Perth Wildcats	30 January 2025	19	38th	2024	Champions (1990, 1991, 1995, 2000, 2010, 2014, 2016, 2017, 2019, 2020)	
S.E. Melbourne Phoenix	30 January 2025	19	3rd	2023	Semifinalist (2021)	
Adelaide 36ers	8 February 2025	20	26th	2018	Champions (1986, 1998, 1999, 2002)	

=== Ladder ===
Pos	2024–25 NBL season											
Pos	Team	Pld	W	L	PCT	Last 5	Streak	Home	Away	PF	PA	PP
1	Illawarra Hawks	29	20	9	68.97%	4–1	W3	10–4	10–5	2941	2645	111.19%
2	Melbourne United	29	19	10	65.52%	4–1	W4	9–6	10–4	2771	2652	104.49%
3	Perth Wildcats	29	18	11	62.07%	3–2	W3	10–5	8–6	2903	2811	103.27%
4	S.E. Melbourne Phoenix	29	16	13	55.17%	2–3	L1	10–4	6–9	2787	2656	104.93%
5	Sydney Kings	29	16	13	55.17%	2–3	L3	7–7	9–6	2630	2557	102.85%
6	Adelaide 36ers	29	13	16	44.83%	2–3	L3	9–6	4–10	2736	2796	97.85%
7	Tasmania JackJumpers	29	13	16	44.83%	1–4	W1	9–5	4–11	2435	2553	95.38%
8	Brisbane Bullets	29	12	17	41.38%	2–3	L1	6–8	6–9	2678	2838	94.36%
9	New Zealand Breakers	29	10	19	34.48%	1–4	L1	6–9	4–10	2485	2650	93.77%
10	Cairns Taipans	29	8	21	27.59%	3–2	L1	4–11	4–10	2561	2769	92.49%

Updated to match(es) played on 8 February 2025. Source: NBL.com.au

=== Ladder progression ===
Leader and qualification to semifinals
Qualification to semifinals
Qualification to play-in
Last place

2024–25 NBL season
Team ╲ Round	1	2	3	4	5	6	7	8	9	10	11	12	13	14	15	16	17	18	19	20
Adelaide 36ers	8	8	6	5	5	4	4	4	4	6	9	8	8	8	8	7	7	6	6	6
Brisbane Bullets	6	10	9	9	7	8	7	8	7	9	8	7	5	7	7	8	8	8	8	8
Cairns Taipans	10	7	4	6	6	9	10	10	10	10	10	10	10	10	10	10	10	10	10	10
Illawarra Hawks	1	1	2	2	1	1	2	3	3	2	2	1	1	1	1	1	1	1	1	1
Melbourne United	2	3	5	3	4	2	3	1	1	1	1	2	2	2	2	2	3	2	2	2
New Zealand Breakers	5	2	1	1	2	3	1	2	2	3	5	9	9	9	9	9	9	9	9	9
Perth Wildcats	4	5	8	7	8	6	6	6	6	5	4	4	6	5	4	3	4	5	3	3
S.E. Melbourne Phoenix	7	9	10	10	10	10	8	7	8	7	6	6	7	6	5	5	5	4	4	4
Sydney Kings	3	4	3	4	3	5	5	5	5	4	3	3	3	4	3	4	2	3	5	5
Tasmania JackJumpers	9	6	7	8	9	7	9	9	9	8	7	5	4	3	6	6	6	7	7	7

Updated to match(es) played on 8 February 2025. Source: NBL.com.au

=== Seedings ===
1. Illawarra Hawks
2. Melbourne United
3. Perth Wildcats
4. S.E. Melbourne Phoenix
5. Sydney Kings
6. Adelaide 36ers

The NBL tie-breaker system as outlined in the NBL Rules and Regulations states that in the case of an identical win–loss record, the overall points percentage will determine order of seeding.

=== Playoff Bracket ===
Play-in / Seeding qualifier
5	Sydney Kings	88
6	Adelaide 36ers	95
3	Perth Wildcats	122
4	S.E. Melbourne Phoenix	105

Play-in game
4	S.E. Melbourne Phoenix	85
6	Adelaide 36ers	75

Semifinals
1	Illawarra Hawks	101	94	126
4	S.E. Melbourne Phoenix	94	101	96
2	Melbourne United	105	89	113
3	Perth Wildcats	93	96	112

Grand Final
1	Illawarra Hawks	88	102	77	80	114
2	Melbourne United	96	100	83	71	104

== Play-in tournament ==
=== (3) Perth Wildcats vs. (4) S.E. Melbourne Phoenix ===
ESPN

11 February 2025
18:30

boxscore
report

Perth Wildcats	122–105	S.E. Melbourne Phoenix
Scoring by quarter: 29–28, 33–39, 34–23, 26–15
Pts: Pinder 35; Rebs: Doolittle, Pinder 11; Asts: Doolittle 5		Pts: Glover 25; Rebs: Hunter 6 Asts: Sobey 8

Perth HPC, Perth
Attendance: 2,975
Referees: Michael Aylen, James Griguol, Ken Widgeon

Regular season series
Perth won 3–1 in the regular season series

20 September 2024

boxscore

Perth Wildcats 106, S.E. Melbourne Phoenix 98

Perth Arena, Perth

3 November 2024

boxscore

S.E. Melbourne Phoenix 100, Perth Wildcats 76

John Cain Arena, Melbourne

15 November 2024

boxscore

Perth Wildcats 97, S.E. Melbourne Phoenix 84

Perth Arena, Perth

31 January 2025

boxscore

Perth Wildcats 100, S.E. Melbourne Phoenix 99

Perth Arena, Perth

=== (5) Sydney Kings vs. (6) Adelaide 36ers ===
ESPN

13 February 2025
19:30

boxscore
report

Sydney Kings	88–95	Adelaide 36ers
Scoring by quarter: 22–23, 19–28, 30–18, 17–26
Pts: Adams 30; Rebs: Oliver 12; Asts: Adams 10		Pts: Vasiljevic 25; Rebs: Harrell 8 Asts: Harrell 7

Sydney SuperDome, Sydney
Attendance: 7,321
Referees: Vaughan Mayberry, Chris Reid, Nico Fernandes

Regular season series
Adelaide won 3–1 in the regular season series

22 September 2024

boxscore

Adelaide 36ers 94, Sydney Kings 102

Perth Arena, Perth

11 October 2024

boxscore

Adelaide 36ers 89, Sydney Kings 79

Adelaide Entertainment Centre, Adelaide

30 December 2024

boxscore

Sydney Kings 96, Adelaide 36ers 111

Sydney SuperDome, Sydney

24 January 2025

boxscore

Sydney Kings 96, Adelaide 36ers 105

Sydney SuperDome, Sydney

=== (4) S.E. Melbourne Phoenix vs. (6) Adelaide 36ers ===
ESPN

16 February 2025
14:30

boxscore
report

S.E. Melbourne Phoenix	85–75	Adelaide 36ers
Scoring by quarter: 15–16, 11–29, 28–15, 31–15
Pts: Hurt 25; Rebs: Hurt 9 Asts: Foxwell 6		Pts: Davis 26; Rebs: Harrell 14; Asts: Davis 5

John Cain Arena, Melbourne
Attendance: 6,118
Referees: Vaughan Mayberry, Chris Reid, Nico Fernandes

Regular season series
S.E. Melbourne won 2–1 in the regular season series

3 October 2024

boxscore

Adelaide 36ers 96, S.E. Melbourne Phoenix 83

Adelaide Entertainment Centre, Adelaide

21 December 2024

boxscore

S.E. Melbourne Phoenix 106, Adelaide 36ers 86

John Cain Arena, Melbourne

8 February 2025

boxscore

S.E. Melbourne Phoenix 105, Adelaide 36ers 99

John Cain Arena, Melbourne

== Semifinals series ==
=== (1) Illawarra Hawks vs. (4) S.E. Melbourne Phoenix ===
ESPN

28 February 2025
19:30

boxscore
report

Illawarra Hawks	101–94	S.E. Melbourne Phoenix
Scoring by quarter: 31–27, 23–34, 32–12, 15–21
Pts: Harvey, Kell 24; Rebs: Kell 10; Asts: Hickey 7		Pts: Wieskamp 22; Rebs: Sobey 9 Asts: Walton 11
Illawarra leads series, 1–0

Wollongong Entertainment Centre, Wollongong
Attendance: 5,491
Referees: Vaughan Mayberry, James Griguol, Ken Widgeon

ESPN

2 March 2025
14:30

boxscore
report

S.E. Melbourne Phoenix	101–94	Illawarra Hawks
Scoring by quarter: 24–24, 27–23, 15–21, 35–26
Pts: Hurt 30; Rebs: Hunter 9 Asts: Glover 5		Pts: Hickey 19; Rebs: Kell 8 Asts: Kell 6
Series tied, 1–1

John Cain Arena, Melbourne
Attendance: 8,636
Referees: Vaughan Mayberry, James Griguol, Ken Widgeon

ESPN

5 March 2025
19:30

boxscore
report

Illawarra Hawks	126–96	S.E. Melbourne Phoenix
Scoring by quarter: 37–22, 33–22, 33–20, 23–32
Pts: Kell 30; Rebs: Froling 12; Asts: Hickey 7		Pts: Wieskamp 25; Rebs: Hunter, Sobey 6 Asts: Foxwell 3
Illawarra wins series, 2–1

Wollongong Entertainment Centre, Wollongong
Attendance: 5,203
Referees: Vaughan Mayberry, James Griguol, Ken Widgeon

Regular season series
S.E. Melbourne won 2–1 in the regular season series

26 October 2024

boxscore

S.E. Melbourne Phoenix 82, Illawarra Hawks 88

John Cain Arena, Melbourne

30 November 2024

boxscore

S.E. Melbourne Phoenix 103, Illawarra Hawks 100

John Cain Arena, Melbourne

31 December 2024

boxscore

Illawarra Hawks 105, S.E. Melbourne Phoenix 110

Wollongong Entertainment Centre, Wollongong

=== (2) Melbourne United vs. (3) Perth Wildcats ===
ESPN

27 February 2025
19:30

boxscore
report

Melbourne United	105–93	Perth Wildcats
Scoring by quarter: 23–17, 26–33, 32–21, 24–22
Pts: Goulding 41; Rebs: White 10; Asts: Dellavedova 9		Pts: Pinder 24; Rebs: Pinder 11; Asts: Cotton 6
Melbourne leads series, 1–0

John Cain Arena, Melbourne
Attendance: 7,473
Referees: Chris Reid, Michael Aylen, Nico Fernandes

ESPN

1 March 2025
17:00

boxscore
report

Perth Wildcats	96–89	Melbourne United
Scoring by quarter: 21–36, 20–19, 22–19, 33–15
Pts: Windler 27; Rebs: Doolittle, Windler 11; Asts: Doolittle 6		Pts: Goulding 15; Rebs: Dellavedova 8 Asts: Dellavedova 12
Series tied, 1–1

Perth Arena, Perth
Attendance: 12,961
Referees: Chris Reid, Michael Aylen, Nico Fernandes

ESPN

4 March 2025
19:30

boxscore
report

Melbourne United	113–112	Perth Wildcats
Scoring by quarter: 26–37, 32–25, 29–22, 26–28
Pts: Clark 38; Rebs: White 9 Asts: Dellavedova 11		Pts: Doolittle 37; Rebs: Doolittle 10; Asts: Cotton 6
Melbourne wins series, 2–1

John Cain Arena, Melbourne
Attendance: 5,618
Referees: Chris Reid, Michael Aylen, Nico Fernandes

Regular season series
Melbourne won 3–0 in the regular season series

4 October 2024

boxscore

Perth Wildcats 68, Melbourne United 97

Perth Arena, Perth

9 November 2024

boxscore

Melbourne United 106, Perth Wildcats 97

John Cain Arena, Melbourne

22 January 2025

boxscore

Perth Wildcats 93, Melbourne United 99

Perth Arena, Perth

== Championship series ==
=== (1) Illawarra Hawks vs. (2) Melbourne United ===
ESPN

8 March 2025
20:00

boxscore
report

Illawarra Hawks	88–96	Melbourne United
Scoring by quarter: 29–26, 24–17, 14–21, 21–32
Pts: Froling 16; Rebs: Froling, Hickey 7 Asts: Hickey 8		Pts: Dellavedova 18; Rebs: Lee 15; Asts: three players 4
Melbourne leads series, 1–0

Wollongong Entertainment Centre, Wollongong
Attendance: 5,491
Referees: Chris Reid, Michael Aylen, Nico Fernandes

ESPN

12 March 2025
19:30

boxscore
report

Melbourne United	100–102	Illawarra Hawks
Scoring by quarter: 29–29, 20–22, 22–31, 29–20
Pts: Clark 31; Rebs: Lee, White 6 Asts: Dellavedova, Lee 5		Pts: Harvey 24; Rebs: Kell 8 Asts: Kell 6
Series tied, 1–1

John Cain Arena, Melbourne
Attendance: 9,135
Referees: Vaughan Mayberry, Chris Reid, Nico Fernandes

10 Bold

16 March 2025
17:30

boxscore
report

Illawarra Hawks	77–83	Melbourne United
Scoring by quarter: 22–17, 20–24, 25–19, 10–23
Pts: Hickey 12; Rebs: Kell 8 Asts: Kell 3		Pts: White 20; Rebs: Lee 8 Asts: Dellavedova 11
Melbourne leads series, 2–1

Wollongong Entertainment Centre, Wollongong
Attendance: 5,512
Referees: Vaughan Mayberry, Chris Reid, Michael Aylen

10 Bold

19 March 2025
19:30

boxscore
report

Melbourne United	71–80	Illawarra Hawks
Scoring by quarter: 12–15, 20–13, 16–23, 23–29
Pts: Dellavedova, Goulding 17; Rebs: Dellavedova 7 Asts: Dellavedova 6		Pts: Hickey 22; Rebs: Days 11; Asts: Hickey 8
Series tied, 2–2

John Cain Arena, Melbourne
Attendance: 10,175
Referees: Vaughan Mayberry, Michael Aylen, Chris Reid

Network 10

23 March 2025
14:30

boxscore
report

Illawarra Hawks	114–104	Melbourne United
Scoring by quarter: 26–26, 34–24, 22–22, 32–32
Pts: Kell 26; Rebs: Kell 11; Asts: Hickey 8		Pts: Goulding 21; Rebs: White 7 Asts: Dellavedova 7
Illawarra wins series, 3–2

Wollongong Entertainment Centre, Wollongong
Attendance: 5,686
Referees: Vaughan Mayberry, Michael Aylen, Chris Reid

Regular season series
Illawarra won 2–1 in the regular season series

24 October 2024

boxscore

Illawarra Hawks 87, Melbourne United 92

Wollongong Entertainment Centre, Wollongong

13 December 2024

boxscore

Melbourne United 93, Illawarra Hawks 106

John Cain Arena, Melbourne

18 January 2025

boxscore

Illawarra Hawks 117, Melbourne United 95

Wollongong Entertainment Centre, Wollongong

== Media coverage ==
=== Television ===
The league extended its partnership with ESPN Australia. All games are available live on ESPN, Kayo Sports, Network 10 and Fetch TV. In New Zealand, ESPN New Zealand will be the official league broadcaster.

== See also ==
- 2024–25 NBL season
- 2024–25 NBL regular season
