= 2024–25 New Zealand Breakers season =

- Head coach: (Finland) Petteri Koponen
- Co-captains: (United States) Parker Jackson-Cartwright (Australia) Mitch McCarron
- Arena: Spark Arena

NBL results
- Record: 10–19 (34.5%)
- Ladder: 9th
- Finals finish: Did not qualify
- Stats at NBL.com.au

Player records
- Points: (United States) Jackson-Cartwright 18.9
- Rebounds: (Senegal) Fall 6.6
- Assists: (United States) Jackson-Cartwright 6.7
- All statistics correct as of 8 February 2025.

The 2024–25 New Zealand Breakers season was the 22nd season of the franchise in the National Basketball League (NBL), and their first under the leadership of their new head coach Petteri Koponen.

== Roster ==
Note: Flags indicate national team eligibility at FIBA-sanctioned events. Players may hold other non-FIBA nationalities not displayed.

2024–25 New Zealand Breakers roster
Players
Coaches

Pos.	No.	Nat.	Name	Ht.	Wt.
G	0	(New Zealand)	McNaught, Alex (DP)	1.83 m (6 ft 0 in)	90 kg (198 lb)
G/F	1	(Mexico)	López, Karim (NS)	2.02 m (6 ft 8 in)
G/F	2	(Australia)	Bairstow, Sean	2.03 m (6 ft 8 in)	93 kg (205 lb)
F/C	3	(New Zealand)	Mennenga, Sam	2.06 m (6 ft 9 in)	109 kg (240 lb)
G	5	(New Zealand)	Isaac, Kaia (DP)	1.85 m (6 ft 1 in)
G	6	(United States)	Jackson-Cartwright, Parker (injured) (I & C)	1.80 m (5 ft 11 in)	74 kg (163 lb)
G	7	(New Zealand)	King, Mojave	1.96 m (6 ft 5 in)	88 kg (194 lb)
G	8	(Australia)	McCarron, Mitch (C)	1.89 m (6 ft 2 in)	97 kg (214 lb)
F	11	(Australia)	Anticevich, Grant	2.06 m (6 ft 9 in)	104 kg (229 lb)
F	12	(New Zealand)	Darling, Max	1.98 m (6 ft 6 in)	118 kg (260 lb)
G	13	(United States)	Mooney, Matt (I)	1.88 m (6 ft 2 in)	90 kg (198 lb)
F	21	(New Zealand)	Davison, Carlin (DP)	1.96 m (6 ft 5 in)	95 kg (209 lb)
C	22	(Australia)	Pineau, Dane	2.06 m (6 ft 9 in)	103 kg (227 lb)
F	43	(Australia)	Bolden, Jonah	2.03 m (6 ft 8 in)	106 kg (234 lb)
F/C	62	(New Zealand)	Wynyard, Tai	2.08 m (6 ft 10 in)	116 kg (256 lb)
C	99	(Senegal)	Fall, Tacko (I)	2.29 m (7 ft 6 in)	141 kg (311 lb)

Head coach

- (Finland) Petteri Koponen

Assistant coach(es)

- (Croatia) Mario Dugandzic
- (Lithuania) Laimonas Eglinskas
- (United States) Daniel Sokolovsky

Strength & conditioning coach(es)

- (United States) Shane Connolly

Legend

- (C) Team captain
- (DP) Development player
- (I) Import player
- (SRP) Special restricted player
- (NS) Next Star player
- Injured

- Roster
Updated: 19 September 2025

=== Depth chart ===
Pos.	Starting 5	Bench 1	Bench 2
PG	Parker Jackson-Cartwright	Mitch McCarron	Alex McNaught
SG	Matt Mooney	Sean Bairstow	Kaia Isaac
SF	Mojave King	Karim López	Carlin Davison
PF	Jonah Bolden	Max Darling	Grant Anticevich
C	Sam Mennenga	Tacko Fall	Dane Pineau

== Standings ==
=== Ladder ===
Pos	2024–25 NBL season											
Pos	Team	Pld	W	L	PCT	Last 5	Streak	Home	Away	PF	PA	PP
1	Illawarra Hawks	29	20	9	68.97%	4–1	W3	10–4	10–5	2941	2645	111.19%
2	Melbourne United	29	19	10	65.52%	4–1	W4	9–6	10–4	2771	2652	104.49%
3	Perth Wildcats	29	18	11	62.07%	3–2	W3	10–5	8–6	2903	2811	103.27%
4	S.E. Melbourne Phoenix	29	16	13	55.17%	2–3	L1	10–4	6–9	2787	2656	104.93%
5	Sydney Kings	29	16	13	55.17%	2–3	L3	7–7	9–6	2630	2557	102.85%
6	Adelaide 36ers	29	13	16	44.83%	2–3	L3	9–6	4–10	2736	2796	97.85%
7	Tasmania JackJumpers	29	13	16	44.83%	1–4	W1	9–5	4–11	2435	2553	95.38%
8	Brisbane Bullets	29	12	17	41.38%	2–3	L1	6–8	6–9	2678	2838	94.36%
9	New Zealand Breakers	29	10	19	34.48%	1–4	L1	6–9	4–10	2485	2650	93.77%
10	Cairns Taipans	29	8	21	27.59%	3–2	L1	4–11	4–10	2561	2769	92.49%

Updated to match(es) played on 8 February 2025. Source: NBL.com.au

The NBL tie-breaker system as outlined in the NBL Rules and Regulations states that in the case of an identical win–loss record, the overall points percentage will determine order of seeding.

=== Ladder progression ===
Leader and qualification to semifinals
Qualification to semifinals
Qualification to play-in
Last place

2024–25 NBL season
Team ╲ Round	1	2	3	4	5	6	7	8	9	10	11	12	13	14	15	16	17	18	19	20
Adelaide 36ers	8	8	6	5	5	4	4	4	4	6	9	8	8	8	8	7	7	6	6	6
Brisbane Bullets	6	10	9	9	7	8	7	8	7	9	8	7	5	7	7	8	8	8	8	8
Cairns Taipans	10	7	4	6	6	9	10	10	10	10	10	10	10	10	10	10	10	10	10	10
Illawarra Hawks	1	1	2	2	1	1	2	3	3	2	2	1	1	1	1	1	1	1	1	1
Melbourne United	2	3	5	3	4	2	3	1	1	1	1	2	2	2	2	2	3	2	2	2
New Zealand Breakers	5	2	1	1	2	3	1	2	2	3	5	9	9	9	9	9	9	9	9	9
Perth Wildcats	4	5	8	7	8	6	6	6	6	5	4	4	6	5	4	3	4	5	3	3
S.E. Melbourne Phoenix	7	9	10	10	10	10	8	7	8	7	6	6	7	6	5	5	5	4	4	4
Sydney Kings	3	4	3	4	3	5	5	5	5	4	3	3	3	4	3	4	2	3	5	5
Tasmania JackJumpers	9	6	7	8	9	7	9	9	9	8	7	5	4	3	6	6	6	7	7	7

Updated to match(es) played on 8 February 2025. Source: NBL.com.au

== Game log ==
=== Pre-season ===
2024 NBL Blitz game log
Total: 0–3 (Home: 0–1; Road: 0–2)
September: 0–3 (Home: 0–1; Road: 0–2)

Game	Date	Team	Score	High points	High rebounds	High assists	Location Attendance	Record
1	8 September	@ Perth	L 108–102	Parker Jackson-Cartwright (21)	Jonah Bolden (10)	Matt Mooney (5)	Carrara Indoor Stadium n/a	0–1
2	11 September	Adelaide	L 91–98	Parker Jackson-Cartwright (21)	McCarron, Mennenga (5)	Parker Jackson-Cartwright (8)	Gold Coast Sports Centre n/a	0–2
3	13 September	@ Sydney	L 90–79	Matt Mooney (25)	Gillespie, Mennenga (5)	Matt Mooney (8)	Gold Coast Sports Centre n/a	0–3

=== NBLxNBA games ===
2024 pre-season game log
Total: 0–3 (Home: 0–0; Road: 0–3)
October: 0–3 (Home: 0–0; Road: 0–3)

Game	Date	Team	Score	High points	High rebounds	High assists	Location Attendance	Record
1	4 October	@ Utah	L 87–116	Parker Jackson-Cartwright (16)	Karim López (7)	Parker Jackson-Cartwright (9)	Delta Center; 14,121	0–1
2	7 October	@ Philadelphia	L 84–139	Parker Jackson-Cartwright (26)	Freddie Gillespie (6)	Mitch McCarron (3)	Wells Fargo Center; 19,767	0–2
3	10 October	@ Oklahoma City	L 89–117	Matt Mooney (19)	Freddie Gillespie (8)	Parker Jackson-Cartwright (8)	BOK Center n/a	0–3

=== Regular season ===
2024–25 game log
Total: 10–19 (Home: 6–9; Road: 4–10)
September: 2–0 (Home: 2–0; Road: 0–0)

Game	Date	Team	Score	High points	High rebounds	High assists	Location Attendance	Record
1	21 September	Brisbane	W 91–87	Sam Mennenga (22)	Sam Mennenga (7)	Parker Jackson-Cartwright (11)	Perth Superdrome; 2,691	1–0
2	29 September	S.E. Melbourne	W 81–79	Parker Jackson-Cartwright (19)	Sam Mennenga (9)	Parker Jackson-Cartwright (7)	Spark Arena; 5,783	2–0

October: 2–2 (Home: 1–1; Road: 1–1)

Game	Date	Team	Score	High points	High rebounds	High assists	Location Attendance	Record
3	17 October	@ Brisbane	L 84–73	Parker Jackson-Cartwright (20)	Parker Jackson-Cartwright (7)	Parker Jackson-Cartwright (6)	Brisbane Entertainment Centre; 4,391	2–1
4	19 October	Perth	W 89–85	Matt Mooney (28)	Freddie Gillespie (8)	Parker Jackson-Cartwright (9)	Spark Arena; 5,822	3–1
5	24 October	S.E. Melbourne	L 62–88	Parker Jackson-Cartwright (19)	Sam Mennenga (5)	Parker Jackson-Cartwright (6)	Wolfbrook Arena; 3,764	3–2
6	27 October	@ Sydney	W 89–93	Matt Mooney (24)	Karim López (10)	Parker Jackson-Cartwright (8)	Sydney SuperDome; 10,078	4–2

November: 3–2 (Home: 1–0; Road: 2–2)

Game	Date	Team	Score	High points	High rebounds	High assists	Location Attendance	Record
7	2 November	Adelaide	W 109–82	Parker Jackson-Cartwright (25)	Jonah Bolden (9)	Parker Jackson-Cartwright (6)	Spark Arena; 5,537	5–2
8	4 November	@ Melbourne	W 79–113	Sam Mennenga (25)	Bolden, López (10)	Parker Jackson-Cartwright (7)	John Cain Arena; 9,275	6–2
9	9 November	@ Tasmania	L 83–64	Parker Jackson-Cartwright (15)	López, Mennenga (7)	Parker Jackson-Cartwright (9)	Derwent Entertainment Centre; 4,340	6–3
10	16 November	@ Cairns	W 69–77	Matt Mooney (15)	Freddie Gillespie (8)	Parker Jackson-Cartwright (5)	Cairns Convention Centre; 4,767	7–3
11	28 November	@ Illawarra	L 109–71	Parker Jackson-Cartwright (19)	Sam Mennenga (6)	Jackson-Cartwright, McCarron (3)	Wollongong Entertainment Centre; 3,774	7–4

December: 1–7 (Home: 0–4; Road: 1–3)

Game	Date	Team	Score	High points	High rebounds	High assists	Location Attendance	Record
12	1 December	@ Perth	L 123–112	Parker Jackson-Cartwright (34)	Sam Mennenga (8)	Parker Jackson-Cartwright (10)	Perth Arena; 12,505	7–5
13	5 December	Melbourne	L 70–97	Mennenga, Mooney (17)	Grant Anticevich (8)	three players (2)	Wolfbrook Arena; 3,818	7–6
14	7 December	Sydney	L 83–98	Parker Jackson-Cartwright (21)	three players 8	Parker Jackson-Cartwright (6)	TSB Arena; 3,863	7–7
15	12 December	Tasmania	L 76–100	Tacko Fall (16)	Karim López (6)	Parker Jackson-Cartwright (4)	Eventfinda Stadium; 2,845	7–8
16	14 December	@ Adelaide	L 111–94	Parker Jackson-Cartwright (25)	Tacko Fall (10)	Parker Jackson-Cartwright (8)	Adelaide Entertainment Centre; 9,449	7–9
17	20 December	Sydney	L 84–92	Parker Jackson-Cartwright (25)	Bolden, Fall (9)	Parker Jackson-Cartwright (8)	Spark Arena; 5,006	7–10
18	25 December	@ Tasmania	L 97–82	Parker Jackson-Cartwright (23)	Tacko Fall (9)	Parker Jackson-Cartwright (6)	Derwent Entertainment Centre; 4,340	7–11
19	31 December	@ Cairns	W 68–92	Matt Mooney (23)	Tacko Fall (12)	Matt Mooney (10)	Cairns Convention Centre; 4,870	8–11

January: 1–7 (Home: 1–3; Road: 0–4)

Game	Date	Team	Score	High points	High rebounds	High assists	Location Attendance	Record
20	5 January	Perth	L 86–96	Fall, Mooney (28)	Tacko Fall (9)	Matt Mooney (6)	Spark Arena; 4,781	8–12
21	8 January	@ Brisbane	L 83–74	Matt Mooney (21)	Sam Mennenga (9)	Bolden, McCarron (2)	Brisbane Entertainment Centre; 5,341	8–13
22	11 January	@ Illawarra	L 108–100	Matt Mooney (33)	Tacko Fall (5)	Matt Mooney (8)	Wollongong Entertainment Centre; 5,562	8–14
23	13 January	Melbourne	L 89–91	López, Mooney (19)	Tacko Fall (9)	Matt Mooney (8)	TSB Stadium; 2,110	8–15
24	16 January	Tasmania	W 85–75	Sam Mennenga (29)	Sam Mennenga (9)	Matt Mooney (11)	Spark Arena; 4,818	9–15
25	18 January	@ S.E. Melbourne	L 102–89	López, Mooney (20)	Jonah Bolden (10)	Parker Jackson-Cartwright (6)	State Basketball Centre; 3,422	9–16
26	24 January	Brisbane	L 87–93	Matt Mooney (24)	Jonah Bolden (8)	Parker Jackson-Cartwright (9)	Wolfbrook Arena; 4,196	9–17
27	26 January	@ Adelaide	L 94–78	Mojave King (20)	Karim López (11)	Matt Mooney (9)	Adelaide Entertainment Centre; 9,505	9–18

February: 1–1 (Home: 1–1; Road: 0–0)

Game	Date	Team	Score	High points	High rebounds	High assists	Location Attendance	Record
28	1 February	Cairns	W 99–92	Matt Mooney (24)	Bolden, Fall (9)	Matt Mooney (8)	Spark Arena; 5,625	10–18
29	5 February	Illawarra	L 82–98	Tacko Fall (16)	López, Mennenga (6)	Mitch McCarron (5)	Spark Arena; 6,223	10–19

2024–25 season schedule

== Transactions ==
=== Re-signed ===
Player	Date Signed	Contract	Ref.
Parker Jackson-Cartwright	5 April 2024	1-year deal	
Max Darling	7 August 2024	3-year deal (club option)	

=== Additions ===
Player	Date Signed	Contract	Former team	Ref.
Sam Mennenga	15 March 2024	2-year deal	Cairns Taipans	
Mojave King	18 April 2024	1-year deal	Indiana Mad Ants	
Mitch McCarron	26 April 2024	2-year deal	Adelaide 36ers	
Jonah Bolden	2 May 2024	1-year deal	Sydney Kings	
Sean Bairstow	23 July 2024	2-year deal (club option)	VCU Rams	
Grant Anticevich	23 July 2024	1-year deal	BG Göttingen	
Freddie Gillespie	25 July 2024	1-year deal	Crvena zvezda	
Kaia Isaac	7 August 2024	2-year deal (DP)	Canterbury Rams	
Matt Mooney	9 August 2024	1-year deal	Aquila Basket Trento	
Karim López	10 August 2024	2-year deal (next star)	Joventut Badalona	
Tacko Fall	26 November 2024	2-year deal	Nanjing Monkey Kings	
Tai Wynyard	7 December 2024	1-year deal (NRP)	Shanghai Sharks	

=== Subtractions ===
Player	Reason left	Date Left	New Team	Ref.
Thomas Abercrombie	Retired	13 February 2024	n/a	
Justinian Jessup	Mutual release	10 March 2024	ratiopharm Ulm	
Izayah Le'afa	Free agent	19 April 2024	Sydney Kings	
William McDowell-White	Free agent	15 May 2024	Alba Berlin	
Finn Delany	Free agent	17 June 2024	Veltex Shizuoka	
Mantas Rubštavičius	Free agent	29 July 2024	Lietkabelis Panevėžys	
Zylan Cheatham	Free agent	1 August 2024	Nagoya Diamond Dolphins	
Anthony Lamb	Free agent	2 August 2024	Aquila Basket Trento	
Cameron Gliddon	Retired	6 September 2024	Auckland Tutara	
Mangok Mathiang	Free agent	26 September 2024	Ningbo Rockets	
Freddie Gillespie	Released	19 November 2024	Olimpia Milano	

== Awards ==
=== Club awards ===
- Club MVP: Parker Jackson-Cartwright
- Defensive Player: Mojave King
- Fan's Memorable Moment: Sam Mennenga
- Blackwell Community Cup: Mark Xu
- Clubman Award: Kevin Blakeman
- Member's Choice Award: Parker Jackson-Cartwright

== See also ==
- 2024–25 NBL season
- New Zealand Breakers
