= Grant Anticevich =

Australian basketball player

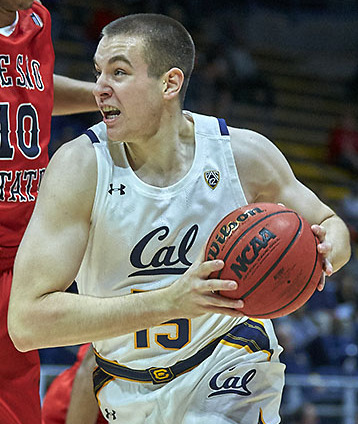
- Anticevich with the California Golden Bears in 2019

No. 11 – Okapi Aalst
- Position: Forward
- League: BNXT League

Personal information
- Born: 14 April 1998 (age 28) (Note: Some sources list him as being born on 14 April 1998, while others state he was born on 4 February 1999.) Sydney, New South Wales, Australia
- Listed height: 203 cm (6 ft 8 in)
- Listed weight: 104 kg (229 lb)

Career information
- High school: Newington College (Sydney, New South Wales)
- College: California (2017–2022)
- NBA draft: 2022: undrafted
- Playing career: 2017–present

Career history
- 2017: Bankstown Bruins
- 2022–2023: South East Melbourne Phoenix
- 2023: Southland Sharks
- 2023–2024: BG Göttingen
- 2024–2025: New Zealand Breakers
- 2025: Pallacanestro Varese
- 2025: Saskatchewan Rattlers
- 2025–2026: Split
- 2026–present: Okapi Aalst

Career highlights
- Croatian Cup winner (2026)

Grant Ryan Anticevich (born 14 April 1998) is an Australian-Croatian professional basketball player for Okapi Aalst of the BNXT League. He played five years of college basketball for the California Golden Bears before debuting in the National Basketball League (NBL) for the South East Melbourne Phoenix in 2022. He holds a Croatian passport.

== Early life and career ==
Anticevich was born in Sydney, New South Wales, in the suburb of Greenacre. He attended Newington College in Sydney, where he was captain of the basketball team. He played for New South Wales state teams and won silver medals at both under 18 level and under 20 level. He was also a member of the 2016 Australian U20 Emus squad.

In 2017, Anticevich played for the Bankstown Bruins in the Waratah League, averaging 6.6 points, 7.4 rebounds and 1.0 assists in 11 games.

== College career ==
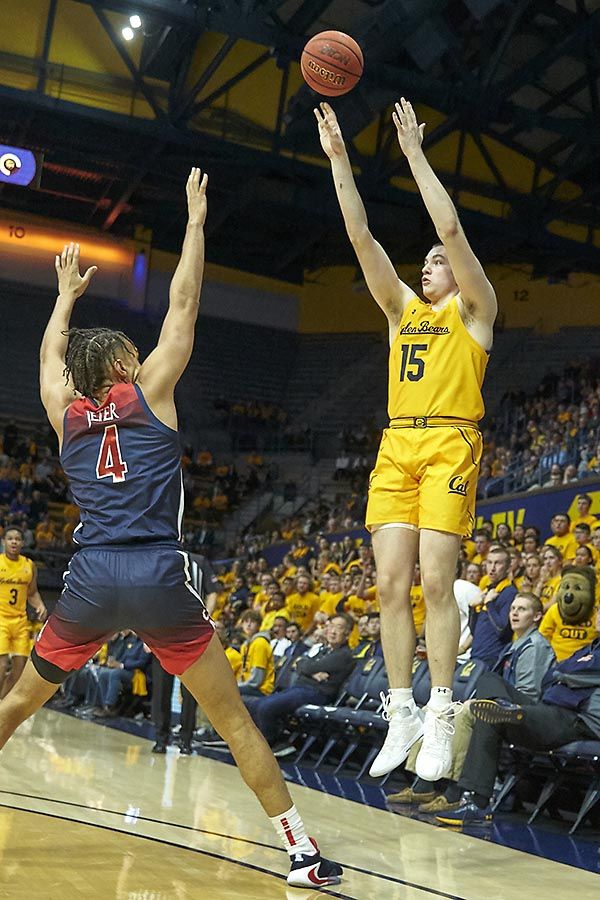
Anticevich (#15) with the Golden Bears in February 2020

Anticevich moved to the United States in 2017 to play college basketball for the California Golden Bears.

As a freshman in 2017–18, Anticevich appeared in 23 games for the Bears, averaging 1.5 points and 1.6 rebounds in 7.4 minutes per game.

As a sophomore in 2018–19, Anticevich appeared in 27 games and made four starts, averaging 2.7 points and 2.1 rebounds in 11.7 minutes per game. He scored a season-high 13 points against San Diego State on 8 December 2018.

As a junior in 2019–20, Anticevich was the lone Bear to start all 32 games. He led the team in rebounding (5.6) and was fourth in scoring (8.3) and averaged just over 30 minutes played per game. He scored a career-high 23 points against California Baptist on 15 November 2019, going 5-of-5 from 3-point range to tie a school record with Amit Tamir and Eric Vierneisel. He had a career-high 11 rebounds against Oregon State on 1 February 2020.

As a senior in 2020–21, Anticevich made 21 starts in 25 games played and averaged a career-high 8.9 points in 25.9 minutes per game. He scored a season-high 21 points twice, the first against Pepperdine on 9 December 2020 and the second against UCLA on 21 January 2021. In the game against UCLA, he tied his own school record by shooting 5-of-5 from 3-point range, becoming just the fourth Pac-12 player in the previous 25 years with two career games of 5-for-5 or better from 3-point range, joining Arizona's Gilbert Arenas, Stanford's Jeremy Green and UCLA's Aaron Holiday (two each). He missed four games in late December after undergoing an emergency appendectomy.

Anticevich decided to return to California for a fifth year, utilising the NCAA's COVID-19 waiver. He played in all 32 games and made 25 starts in the 2021–22 season, averaging career highs of 9.7 points and 6.8 rebounds in 31.5 minutes played per game. He was named the Pac-12 Player of the Week for 20–26 December after recording a career-high 25 points with seven 3-pointers along with 11 rebounds against Pacific on 22 December. His 7-of-11 3-pointers tied for the most 3-pointers made in a single game by a Pac-12 player during the season and were the most by a Bear since Jabari Bird made seven in 2017. He left Cal as the school-record holder for career games played (139) and graduated with his undergraduate degree in psychology.

== Professional career ==
On 10 August 2022, Anticevich signed a one-year deal with the South East Melbourne Phoenix of the Australian National Basketball League (NBL). In 18 games during the 2022–23 season, he averaged 2.1 points and 1.6 rebounds per game.

On 1 March 2023, Anticevich signed with the Southland Sharks of the New Zealand National Basketball League (NZNBL) for the 2023 season. In 18 games, he averaged 14.6 points, 9.7 rebounds and 1.8 assists per game.

On 14 July 2023, Anticevich signed with BG Göttingen of the Basketball Bundesliga for the 2023–24 season. In 34 league games, he averaged 7.8 points, 5.1 rebounds and 1.1 assists per game. He also appeared in 12 FIBA Europe Cup games, averaging 9.1 points, 6.3 rebounds and 1.2 assists per game.

On 23 July 2024, Anticevich signed with the New Zealand Breakers of the Australian NBL for the 2024–25 season. In 26 games, he averaged 4.2 points and 2.2 rebounds per game.

On 28 March 2025, Anticevich signed with Pallacanestro Varese of the Lega Basket Serie A. He appeared in four games to finish the 2024–25 LBA season.

On 18 April 2025, Anticevich signed with the Saskatchewan Rattlers of the Canadian Elite Basketball League (CEBL) for the 2025 season. In 24 games, he averaged 9.8 points, 5.8 rebounds, 2.1 assists and 1.0 steals per game.

In August 2025, Anticevich signed with Split of the Croatian League and the ABA League.

On June 13, 2026, he signed with Okapi Aalst of the BNXT League.

== Personal life ==
Anticevich's family hails from Croatia, making him fluent in Croatian. He holds a Croatian passport and has Croatian nationality.
