= 2024–25 Tasmania JackJumpers season =

- Head coach: (United States) Scott Roth
- Captain: (Australia) Clint Steindl
- Arena: Derwent Entertainment Centre

NBL results
- Record: 13–16 (44.8%)
- Ladder: 7th
- Finals finish: Did not qualify
- Intercontinental Cup: Third place (Defeated Al Riyadi 80–75)
- Stats at NBL.com.au

Player records
- Points: (United States) Crawford 16.0
- Rebounds: (South Sudan) Deng 5.0
- Assists: (United States) Crawford 4.4
- All statistics correct as of 8 February 2025.

The 2024–25 Tasmania JackJumpers season was the 4th season for the franchise in the National Basketball League (NBL).

As reigning NBL champions, the JackJumpers competed in the 2024 FIBA Intercontinental Cup, becoming the first team from Oceania to play in the FIBA Intercontinental Cup. Tasmania finished third, after defeating Al Riyadi from Lebanon in the third place game.

== Roster ==
Note: Flags indicate national team eligibility at FIBA-sanctioned events. Players may hold other non-FIBA nationalities not displayed.

2024–25 Tasmania JackJumpers roster
Players
Coaches

Pos.	No.	Nat.	Name	Ht.	Wt.
G	1	(United States)	Crawford, Jordon (I)	1.68 m (5 ft 6 in)	70 kg (154 lb)
G	2	(Australia)	Nunn, Brody (DP)	1.85 m (6 ft 1 in)
G/F	3	(Australia)	Drmic, Anthony	1.98 m (6 ft 6 in)	91 kg (201 lb)
G	4	(Australia)	Stoddart, Nicholas (DP)	1.88 m (6 ft 2 in)
F	5	(South Sudan)	Deng, Majok	2.05 m (6 ft 9 in)	84 kg (185 lb)
F	7	(New Zealand)	Brown, Walter (DP)	1.94 m (6 ft 4 in)	89 kg (196 lb)
G/F	11	(New Zealand)	Te Rangi, Reuben	1.98 m (6 ft 6 in)	105 kg (231 lb)
C	12	(Australia)	Gak, Gorjok	2.11 m (6 ft 11 in)	102 kg (225 lb)
G	13	(Australia)	Macdonald, Sean (injured)	1.88 m (6 ft 2 in)	86 kg (190 lb)
F	15	(Australia)	Woodhill, Archie (DP)	2.06 m (6 ft 9 in)	102 kg (225 lb)
F	20	(Australia)	Krslovic, Fabijan	2.03 m (6 ft 8 in)	106 kg (234 lb)
C	22	(Australia)	Magnay, Will (injured)	2.08 m (6 ft 10 in)	111 kg (245 lb)
G	25	(United States)	Doyle, Milton (I)	1.93 m (6 ft 4 in)	86 kg (190 lb)
F	34	(United States)	Hummer, Ian (I)	2.01 m (6 ft 7 in)	102 kg (225 lb)
G/F	35	(Australia)	Steindl, Clint (C)	2.00 m (6 ft 7 in)	89 kg (196 lb)
G	38	(Australia)	Barker, Lachlan (NRP)	1.88 m (6 ft 2 in)	86 kg (190 lb)

Head coach

- (United States) Scott Roth

Assistant coach(es)

- (Australia) Jack Fleming
- (Australia) Mark Radford
- (Australia) Jarrad Weeks

Team manager

- (Australia) Mark Chivers

Legend

- (C) Team captain
- (DP) Development player
- (IN) Inactive
- (I) Import player
- (TP) Training player
- (SRP) Special restricted player
- (NRP) Nominated replacement player
- (NS) Next Star player
- Injured

- Roster
Updated: 30 January 2025

=== Depth chart ===
Pos.	Starting 5	Bench 1	Bench 2	Development
PG	Jordon Crawford	Sean Macdonald	Lachlan Barker	Brody Nunn
SG	Milton Doyle	Craig Sword	Walter Brown	Nicholas Stoddart
SF	Anthony Drmic	Clint Steindl
PF	Majok Deng	Reuben Te Rangi	Archie Woodhill
C	Will Magnay	Fabijan Krslovic	Gorjok Gak

== Standings ==
=== Ladder ===
Pos	2024–25 NBL season											
Pos	Team	Pld	W	L	PCT	Last 5	Streak	Home	Away	PF	PA	PP
1	Illawarra Hawks	29	20	9	68.97%	4–1	W3	10–4	10–5	2941	2645	111.19%
2	Melbourne United	29	19	10	65.52%	4–1	W4	9–6	10–4	2771	2652	104.49%
3	Perth Wildcats	29	18	11	62.07%	3–2	W3	10–5	8–6	2903	2811	103.27%
4	S.E. Melbourne Phoenix	29	16	13	55.17%	2–3	L1	10–4	6–9	2787	2656	104.93%
5	Sydney Kings	29	16	13	55.17%	2–3	L3	7–7	9–6	2630	2557	102.85%
6	Adelaide 36ers	29	13	16	44.83%	2–3	L3	9–6	4–10	2736	2796	97.85%
7	Tasmania JackJumpers	29	13	16	44.83%	1–4	W1	9–5	4–11	2435	2553	95.38%
8	Brisbane Bullets	29	12	17	41.38%	2–3	L1	6–8	6–9	2678	2838	94.36%
9	New Zealand Breakers	29	10	19	34.48%	1–4	L1	6–9	4–10	2485	2650	93.77%
10	Cairns Taipans	29	8	21	27.59%	3–2	L1	4–11	4–10	2561	2769	92.49%

Updated to match(es) played on 8 February 2025. Source: NBL.com.au

The NBL tie-breaker system as outlined in the NBL Rules and Regulations states that in the case of an identical win–loss record, the overall points percentage will determine order of seeding.

=== Ladder progression ===
Leader and qualification to semifinals
Qualification to semifinals
Qualification to play-in
Last place

2024–25 NBL season
Team ╲ Round	1	2	3	4	5	6	7	8	9	10	11	12	13	14	15	16	17	18	19	20
Adelaide 36ers	8	8	6	5	5	4	4	4	4	6	9	8	8	8	8	7	7	6	6	6
Brisbane Bullets	6	10	9	9	7	8	7	8	7	9	8	7	5	7	7	8	8	8	8	8
Cairns Taipans	10	7	4	6	6	9	10	10	10	10	10	10	10	10	10	10	10	10	10	10
Illawarra Hawks	1	1	2	2	1	1	2	3	3	2	2	1	1	1	1	1	1	1	1	1
Melbourne United	2	3	5	3	4	2	3	1	1	1	1	2	2	2	2	2	3	2	2	2
New Zealand Breakers	5	2	1	1	2	3	1	2	2	3	5	9	9	9	9	9	9	9	9	9
Perth Wildcats	4	5	8	7	8	6	6	6	6	5	4	4	6	5	4	3	4	5	3	3
S.E. Melbourne Phoenix	7	9	10	10	10	10	8	7	8	7	6	6	7	6	5	5	5	4	4	4
Sydney Kings	3	4	3	4	3	5	5	5	5	4	3	3	3	4	3	4	2	3	5	5
Tasmania JackJumpers	9	6	7	8	9	7	9	9	9	8	7	5	4	3	6	6	6	7	7	7

Updated to match(es) played on 8 February 2025. Source: NBL.com.au

== Game log ==
=== Pre-season ===
2024 NBL Blitz game log
Total: 0–2 (Home: 0–1; Road: 0–1)
September: 0–2 (Home: 0–1; Road: 0–1)

Game	Date	Team	Score	High points	High rebounds	High assists	Location Attendance	Record
1	7 September	Brisbane	L 76–89	Jordon Crawford (15)	Fabijan Krslovic (7)	Crawford, Nunn (4)	Carrara Indoor Stadium n/a	0–1
2	9 September	@ Adelaide	L 96–64	Milton Doyle (16)	Walter Brown (8)	Jordon Crawford (4)	Gold Coast Sports Centre n/a	0–2

=== Regular season ===
2024–25 game log
Total: 13–16 (Home: 9–5; Road: 4–11)
September: 1–1 (Home: 1–0; Road: 0–1)

Game	Date	Team	Score	High points	High rebounds	High assists	Location Attendance	Record
1	19 September	@ Melbourne	L 88–79	Milton Doyle (23)	Reuben Te Rangi (8)	Will Magnay (5)	Perth Arena; 4,666	0–1
2	29 September	Melbourne	W 81–72	Jordon Crawford (19)	Will Magnay (11)	Milton Doyle (3)	Derwent Entertainment Centre; 4,340	1–1

October: 2–4 (Home: 1–1; Road: 1–3)

Game	Date	Team	Score	High points	High rebounds	High assists	Location Attendance	Record
3	4 October	@ Cairns	L 90–78	Milton Doyle (19)	Majok Deng (9)	Crawford, Drmic (4)	Cairns Convention Centre; 4,538	1–2
4	6 October	Perth	W 84–79 (OT)	Milton Doyle (20)	Will Magnay (13)	Milton Doyle (4)	Derwent Entertainment Centre; 4,340	2–2
5	12 October	@ Illawarra	L 109–76	Jordon Crawford (19)	Milton Doyle (5)	Jordon Crawford (5)	Wollongong Entertainment Centre; 4,885	2–3
6	18 October	Sydney	L 71–80	Jordon Crawford (25)	Milton Doyle (7)	Clint Steindl (5)	Silverdome; 3,255	2–4
7	20 October	@ Adelaide	L 77–73	Milton Doyle (22)	Majok Deng (9)	Crawford, Doyle (6)	Adelaide Entertainment Centre; 9,384	2–5
8	26 October	@ Brisbane	W 79–87	Crawford, Deng (16)	Will Magnay (9)	Jordon Crawford (6)	Brisbane Entertainment Centre; 4,756	3–5

November: 3–3 (Home: 2–1; Road: 1–2)

Game	Date	Team	Score	High points	High rebounds	High assists	Location Attendance	Record
9	1 November	S.E. Melbourne	L 77–79	Will Magnay (19)	Fabijan Krslovic (9)	Jordon Crawford (6)	Silverdome; 3,255	3–6
10	3 November	@ Sydney	L 88–60	Jordon Crawford (12)	Fabijan Krslovic (8)	Milton Doyle (4)	Sydney SuperDome; 9,124	3–7
11	7 November	@ Perth	L 88–82	Milton Doyle (30)	Reuben Te Rangi (8)	Crawford, Doyle (4)	Perth Arena; 10,793	3–8
12	9 November	New Zealand	W 83–64	Jordon Crawford (19)	Fabijan Krslovic (9)	Milton Doyle (5)	Derwent Entertainment Centre; 4,340	4–8
13	15 November	Brisbane	W 95–92	Milton Doyle (32)	Doyle, Magnay (7)	Crawford, Macdonald (7)	Derwent Entertainment Centre; 4,340	5–8
14	30 November	@ Adelaide	W 73–77	Macdonald, Magnay (15)	Doyle, Te Rangi (7)	Drmic, Macdonald (5)	Adelaide Entertainment Centre; 9,428	6–8

December: 4–0 (Home: 2–0; Road: 2–0)

Game	Date	Team	Score	High points	High rebounds	High assists	Location Attendance	Record
15	5 December	Cairns	W 99–90	Milton Doyle (21)	Will Magnay (13)	Milton Doyle (7)	Derwent Entertainment Centre; 4,340	7–8
16	12 December	@ New Zealand	W 76–100	Jordon Crawford (24)	Doyle, Magnay (6)	Will Magnay (8)	Eventfinda Stadium; 2,845	8–8
17	23 December	@ Melbourne	W 91–97	Jordon Crawford (16)	Majok Deng (7)	Jordon Crawford (6)	John Cain Arena; 10,175	9–8
18	25 December	New Zealand	W 97–82	Jordon Crawford (26)	Majok Deng (7)	Milton Doyle (5)	Derwent Entertainment Centre; 4,340	10–8
19	29 December	Brisbane	W 95–86	Milton Doyle (23)	Reuben Te Rangi (7)	Jordon Crawford (6)	Derwent Entertainment Centre; 4,340	11–8

January: 1–7 (Home: 1–3; Road: 0–4)

Game	Date	Team	Score	High points	High rebounds	High assists	Location Attendance	Record
20	5 January	S.E. Melbourne	L 91–105	Jordon Crawford (16)	four players (4)	Sean Macdonald (7)	Derwent Entertainment Centre; 4,340	11–9
21	7 January	@ Illawarra	L 89–84	Sean Macdonald (19)	Doyle, Krslovic (10)	Milton Doyle (7)	Wollongong Entertainment Centre; 4,551	11–10
22	10 January	Adelaide	W 104–103 (OT)	Milton Doyle (26)	Majok Deng (8)	Milton Doyle (9)	Derwent Entertainment Centre; 4,340	12–10
23	12 January	Perth	L 73–105	Jordon Crawford (16)	Ian Hummer (8)	Milton Doyle (4)	Derwent Entertainment Centre; 4,340	12–11
24	16 January	@ New Zealand	L 85–75	Jordon Crawford (26)	Anthony Drmic (7)	Milton Doyle (5)	Spark Arena; 4,818	12–12
25	19 January	@ Sydney	L 88–77	Milton Doyle (21)	Milton Doyle (7)	Crawford, Doyle (4)	Sydney SuperDome; 16,705	12–13
26	25 January	@ S.E. Melbourne	L 116–80	Jordon Crawford (18)	Fabijan Krslovic (8)	Jordon Crawford (5)	State Basketball Centre; 3,422	12–14
27	30 January	Illawarra	L 78–102	Milton Doyle (17)	Fabijan Krslovic (9)	Jordon Crawford (7)	Derwent Entertainment Centre; 4,340	12–15

February: 1–1 (Home: 1–0; Road: 0–1)

Game	Date	Team	Score	High points	High rebounds	High assists	Location Attendance	Record
28	1 February	@ Melbourne	L 94–92	Jordon Crawford (20)	Fabijan Krslovic (6)	Milton Doyle (7)	John Cain Arena; 10,175	12–16
29	8 February	Cairns	W 90–83	Majok Deng (21)	Majok Deng (7)	three players (4)	Derwent Entertainment Centre; 4,340	13–16

2024–25 season schedule

=== FIBA Intercontinental Cup ===
==== Group stage ====
13 September
17:00

Box score

Tasmania JackJumpers (Basketball Australia)	81–59	(Argentine Basketball Confederation) Quimsa
Scoring by quarter: 20–12, 14–12, 22–22, 25–13
Pts: Crawford 15; Rebs: Magnay 9 Asts: Krslovic 4		Pts: Brussino, Tabarez 11; Rebs: Miller 11; Asts: Sansimoni, Romano 3

Singapore Indoor Stadium
Attendance: 3,247
Referees: Johnny Batista (PUR), Boris Krejic (SLO), Ariadna Chueca (ESP)

14 September
13:00

Box score

NBA G League United (USA Basketball)	76–74	(Basketball Australia) Tasmania JackJumpers
Scoring by quarter: 20–11, 24–24, 18–23, 14–16
Pts: Brown 23; Rebs: three players 6 Asts: Burton 5		Pts: Crawford 24; Rebs: Te Rangi 10; Asts: Magnay 5

Singapore Indoor Stadium
Attendance: 4,136
Referees: Julio Anaya (PAN), Carlos Peralta (ECU), Boris Krejic (SLO)

==== Third place game ====
15 September
16:00

Boxscore

Al Riyadi (Lebanese Basketball Federation)	75–80	(Basketball Australia) Tasmania JackJumpers
Scoring by quarter: 20–24, 12–15, 26–12, 17–29
Pts: Gyokchyan 19; Rebs: Gyokchyan, Harris 8 Asts: Gyokchyan, Arakji 6		Pts: Magnay 19; Rebs: Magnay 7 Asts: Doyle 6

Singapore Indoor Stadium
Attendance: 3,881
Referees: Boris Krejic (SLO), Carlos Peralta (ECU), Sun Jian (CHN)

== Transactions ==
=== Re-signed ===
Player	Date Signed	Contract	Ref.
Will Magnay	10 March 2024	2-year deal	
Jack McVeigh	6 April 2024	2-year deal	
Majok Deng	11 April 2024	2-year deal	
Anthony Drmic	12 April 2024	1-year deal	
Jordon Crawford	23 May 2024	1-year deal	

=== Additions ===
Player	Date Signed	Contract	Former team	Ref.
Gorjok Gak	18 April 2024	2-year deal (club option)	S.E. Melbourne Phoenix	
Craig Sword	28 May 2024	1-year deal	Indiana Mad Ants	
Roman Siulepa	9 June 2024	2-year deal (next star)	Centre of Excellence	
Ian Hummer	14 December 2024	1-year deal	Osaka Evessa	
Archie Woodhill	24 January 2025	2-year deal	Sydney Kings	

=== Subtractions ===
Player	Reason left	Date Left	New team	Ref.
Tom Vodanovich	Free agent	25 June 2024	S.E. Melbourne Phoenix	
Jarred Bairstow	Free agent	12 July 2024	Brisbane Bullets	
Jack McVeigh	Released	25 July 2024	Houston Rockets	
Marcus Lee	Free agent	10 August 2024	Melbourne United	
Majok Majok	Free agent	15 August 2024	S.E. Melbourne Phoenix	
Roman Siulepa	Released	20 August 2024	n/a	
Craig Sword	Released	14 December 2024	Kaohsiung Aquas	

== Awards ==
=== Club awards ===
- Club MVP: Jordon Crawford
- Fan Favourite: Majok Deng
- Defensive Player: Will Magnay
- Players Award: Fabijan Krslovic
- Coaches Award: Majok Deng
- Spirit of the JackJumpers: Clint Steindl

== See also ==
- 2024–25 NBL season
- Tasmania JackJumpers
