= Jordon Crawford =

American basketball player (born 1990)

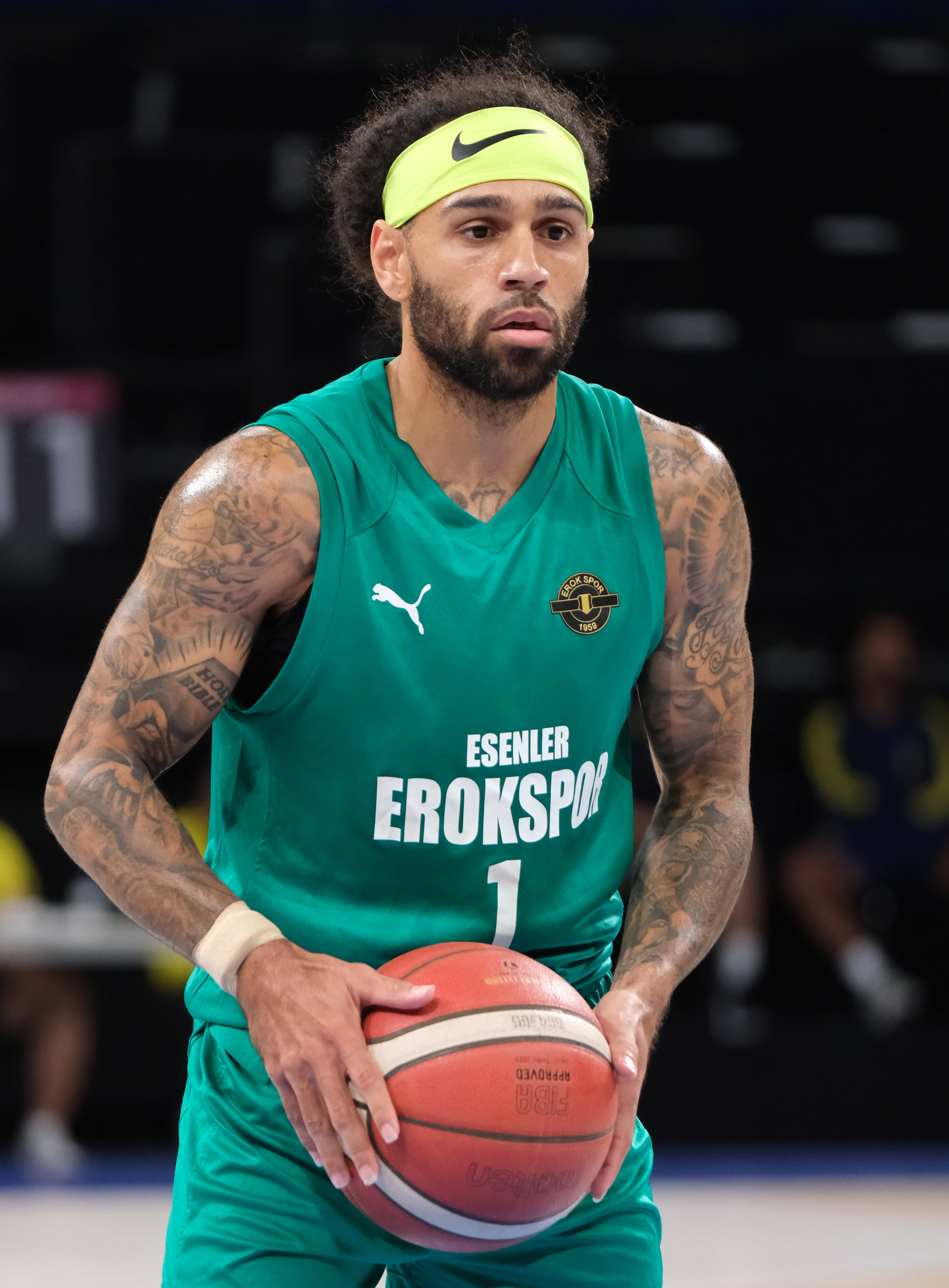
- Crawford with Esenler Erokspor in 2025

No. 1 – Çayırova Belediyespor
- Position: Shooting guard
- League: Basketbol Süper Ligi

Personal information
- Born: July 17, 1990 (age 36) Cincinnati, Ohio, U.S.
- Listed height: 168 cm (5 ft 6 in)
- Listed weight: 70 kg (154 lb)

Career information
- High school: La Salle (Cincinnati, Ohio)
- College: Bowling Green (2009–2013)
- NBA draft: 2013: undrafted
- Playing career: 2014–present

Career history
- 2014–2015: Mapfree Life
- 2015–2017: Westchester Knicks
- 2017: Canton Charge
- 2017: Águilas Doradas de Durango
- 2017–2018: Memphis Hustle
- 2018: MZT Skopje
- 2018–2019: MHP Riesen Ludwigsburg
- 2019–2020: Afyon Belediye
- 2020–2021: Élan Chalon
- 2021–2023: Büyükçekmece Basketbol
- 2023: Piratas de Quebradillas
- 2023–2025: Tasmania JackJumpers
- 2025–2026: Esenler Erokspor
- 2026–present: Çayırova Belediyespor

Career highlights
- NBL champion (2024); BSL scoring champion (2023); Macedonian Cup winner (2018); CIBACOPA All-Star (2017); Cyprus North League champion (2015); Cyprus North League Playoffs MVP (2015); Cyprus North League All-Star (2015); Cyprus North League scoring champion (2015)

Jordon Benjamin Crawford (born July 17, 1990) is an American professional basketball player for Çayırova Belediyespor of the Basketbol Süper Ligi (BSL). He played college basketball for Bowling Green.

== High school career ==
Crawford attended La Salle High School in Cincinnati, Ohio, who he led to a 23–3 record as a senior, including a 9–1 mark in the Greater Catholic League (GCL). Crawford, a team captain, was named conference player of the year, defensive player of the year, and first team all-league. Additionally, he was named first team all-district and all-city.

== College career ==
After graduating from high school, Crawford played for Bowling Green where he was an All-MAC conference player as a senior after averaging 15 points, 4 assist, 3 rebounds and 2 steals per game. He finished with a rank of 4th in school history in assists with 473, 5th in school history in steals with 184, and 23rd in scoring.

== Professional career ==
In September 2014, Crawford signed with the Halifax Rainmen of the Canadian NBL, but later left the team before appearing in a game for them. Crawford's first professional gig came in December 2014 when he signed with Mapfree Life of Cyprus' North League. He averaged a league-leading 26.8 points alongside 6.3 assists, 4.2 rebounds and 2.5 steals per game and led his team to the North League title where he was named the North League Playoffs Most Valuable Player. He was also named to the All-Star Team and played in the league's All-Star Game.

On October 31, 2015, Crawford was selected in the fifth round of the 2015 NBA Development League Draft by the Westchester Knicks. He played a season and a half for Westchester before being traded to the Canton Charge on February 11, 2017. Three days later, he made his debut in a 120–109 win over the Fort Wayne Mad Ants, recording three points, one rebound and one assist in 16 minutes off the bench.

Crawford played for Águilas Doradas de Durango in the Mexican CIBACOPA in 2017 and then joined the Memphis Hustle for the 2017–18 NBA G League season. He left the Hustle in January 2018 and moved to Macedonia to play out the season with MZT Skopje.

For the 2018–19 season, Crawford joined German team MHP Riesen Ludwigsburg.

On September 4, 2019, Crawford signed with Afyon Belediye of the Turkish Basketbol Süper Ligi (BSL).

On November 25, 2020, Crawford signed with Élan Chalon of the LNB Pro A. He averaged over 12 points and 6 assists per game.

On July 18, 2021, Crawford signed with Büyükçekmece of the Turkish BSL. He returned to Büyükçekmece for the 2022–23 season. He had a brief stint with Piratas de Quebradillas during the 2023 BSN season.

On June 23, 2023, Crawford signed with the Tasmania JackJumpers in Australia for the 2023–24 NBL season. He helped the JackJumpers win the NBL championship with a 3–2 grand final series victory over Melbourne United. In game five, Crawford had 27 of his series-high 32 points in the first half. He played all 37 games, averaging more than 16 points, 2.6 rebounds and 3.2 assists in an average of 30 minutes per game.

On May 23, 2024, Crawford re-signed with the JackJumpers for the 2024–25 NBL season. On May 25th, 2025, The JackJumpers announced that he would not be offered a contract for the 2025–26 season.

== Personal life ==
Crawford is the son of Donald and Kelle Crawford. He has a daughter named Alaynah and son Asher Don.
