= Parker Jackson-Cartwright =

American basketball player

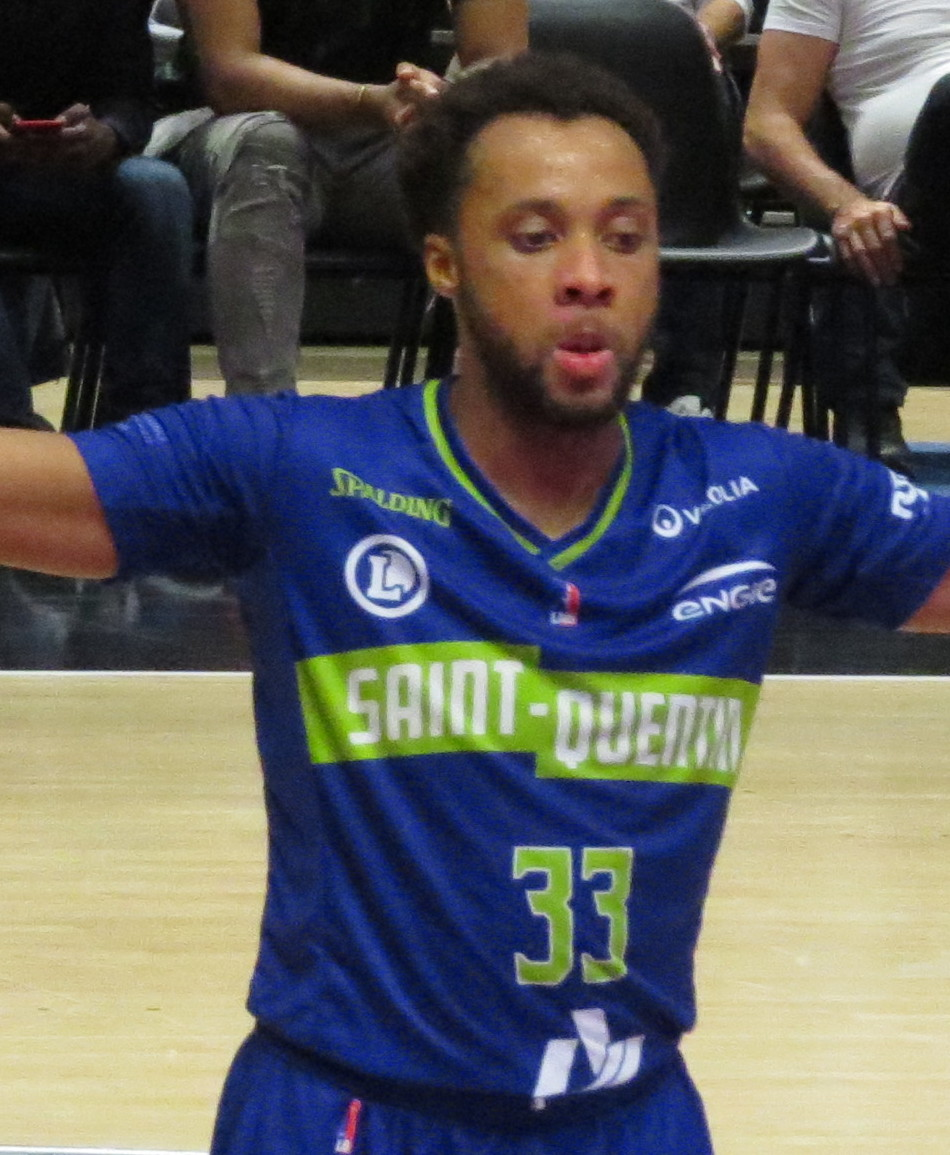
- Jackson-Cartwright with Saint-Quentin in 2020

No. 6 – New Zealand Breakers
- Position: Point guard
- League: NBL

Personal information
- Born: July 12, 1995 (age 31) Los Angeles, California, U.S.
- Listed height: 180 cm (5 ft 11 in)
- Listed weight: 74 kg (163 lb)

Career information
- High school: Loyola (Los Angeles, California); Sierra Canyon School (Chatsworth, California)
- College: Arizona (2014–2018)
- NBA draft: 2018: undrafted
- Playing career: 2019–present

Career history
- 2019: Westchester Knicks
- 2019–2020: Cheshire Phoenix
- 2020–2021: Saint-Quentin
- 2021–2022: Telekom Baskets Bonn
- 2022–2023: ASVEL
- 2023: Beşiktaş
- 2023–present: New Zealand Breakers
- 2024: Galatasaray
- 2025: Rytas Vilnius
- 2026: Nanjing Monkey Kings

Career highlights
- NBL Ignite Cup winner (2026); All-NBL First Team (2024); All-NBL Second Team (2026); Bundesliga MVP (2022); All-Bundesliga First Team (2022); LNB Pro B MVP (2021)

Parker Ellington Jackson-Cartwright (born July 12, 1995) is an American professional basketball player for the New Zealand Breakers of the Australian National Basketball League (NBL). He played college basketball for the Arizona Wildcats.

== High school career ==
Jackson-Cartwright was born and raised in Los Angeles. His parents were heavily influenced by jazz music and he was subsequently named after Charlie Parker and Duke Ellington.

He began his high school career at Loyola High School. He missed 12 games during his junior season due to a stress fracture. Jackson-Cartwright averaged 14 points, eight assists, five rebounds and two steals per game as a junior. Jackson-Cartwright missed his senior season of high school due to an academic issue. Rather than being dismissed from the team, he withdrew from the school in February 2014 and transferred to Sierra Canyon School, where he finished high school without basketball. He was a four-star recruit and committed to Arizona over UCLA, Washington, USC and others. The 2016 film At All Costs chronicles his AAU career and college recruitment.

== College career ==
Jackson-Cartwright served as a backup to T. J. McConnell as a freshman, averaging 2.9 points and 1.8 assists per game. He split time with Kadeem Allen at point guard as a sophomore and averaged 5.2 points and 3.4 assists per game. Jackson-Cartwright averaged 5.9 points, 2.5 rebounds, and 4.1 assists per game as a junior, shooting 42.3 percent from behind the 3-point arc. In August 2017, he traveled with the team to Spain and was only feet away when the 2017 Barcelona attacks began, and ducked into a store until they ended. Coming into his senior season, he missed a practice and Pac-12 Media Day with a thigh contusion. On January 4, 2018, he scored a career-high 19 points in a 94–82 win over Utah. As a senior, Jackson-Cartwright averaged 7.8 points and 4.5 assists per game, shooting 41.7 percent from 3-point range. He finished his college career with 459 assists.

== Professional career ==
Jackson-Cartwright was drafted by Raptors 905 of the NBA G League in the second round of the 2018 NBA G League draft with the 52nd pick. He was cut during training camp due to a leg injury. He joined the Westchester Knicks in February 2019 and played in two games for the team.

On July 20, 2019, Jackson-Cartwright signed with the Cheshire Phoenix of the British Basketball League (BBL). During the shortened 2019–20 season, he tied Cheshire's single-game assist record with 13 in two games and scored over 20 points in five of the 13 games during the BBL Championship. He finished second in the league in points per game (20.2), third in assists (7.4) and first in steals (3.7).

On July 17, 2020, Jackson-Cartwright signed with Saint-Quentin of the LNB Pro B. He received the 2021 LNB Pro B Most Valuable Player award after averaging 15.4 points, 3.2 rebounds, and 7.2 assists per game.

On July 5, 2021, Jackson-Cartwright signed with Telekom Baskets Bonn of the Basketball Bundesliga. He won the Bundesliga MVP for the 2021–22 season after averaging 19.3 points, 7.4 assists and 2.0 steals per game. He had a 40-point game against Bamberg during the season. He was also named Most Effective Player International.

On July 8, 2022, Jackson-Cartwright signed with ASVEL of the French LNB Pro A. In January 2023, he left France and joined Beşiktaş Emlakjet of the Basketbol Süper Ligi (BSL) for the rest of the season.

On August 2, 2023, Jackson-Cartwright signed with the New Zealand Breakers of the Australian National Basketball League (NBL) for the 2023–24 season. He averaged 20.6 points and 5.8 assists per game, helping the Breakers to a 13–15 record and a spot in the play-in tournament. He was named to the All-NBL First Team.

On March 15, 2024, Jackson-Cartwright signed with Galatasaray of the BSL. Despite signing an 18-month contract with Galatasaray, he parted ways with the team after one game.

On April 5, 2024, Jackson-Cartwright re-signed with the Breakers for the 2024–25 NBL season. On December 28, 2024, he was suspended for five games following an incident with a game official during the Breakers' Christmas Day game against the Tasmania JackJumpers. Upon his return in January 2025, he played three more games before being ruled out for the Breakers' final two regular season games with a significant rib cartilage injury.

On January 30, 2025, Jackson-Cartwright signed with Rytas Vilnius of the Lithuanian Basketball League, joining the team in February for the remainder of the 2024–25 season.

On June 24, 2025, Jackson-Cartwright re-signed with the Breakers on a two-year deal. On October 8, 2025, he recorded 20 points and 17 assists in a 117–88 win over the Illawarra Hawks, setting both a Breakers all-time assists record and the equal-most ever assists in the 40-minute era of the NBL, tying Damian Keogh's 1983 mark. In the 2025–26 NBL season, the Breakers finished outside the finals spots in seventh at the end of the regular season but won the inaugural NBL Ignite Cup Final, defeating the Adelaide 36ers 111–107 behind Jackson-Cartwright's team-high 29 points. He was named to the All-NBL Second Team.

In March 2026, Jackson-Cartwright joined the Nanjing Monkey Kings of the Chinese Basketball Association for the rest of the 2025–26 CBA season.

Over the first few weeks of the 2026–27 NBL season, Jackson-Cartwright established himself as an MVP favorite. On October 10, 2026, he was ruled out for multiple weeks with a lower-leg injury. He returned to action in late October. On November 10, he was ruled out for the rest of the season with a stress fracture in his tibia.

== Career statistics ==
Legend
GP	Games played	GS	Games started	MPG	Minutes per game
FG%	Field goal percentage	3P%	3-point field goal percentage	FT%	Free throw percentage
RPG	Rebounds per game	APG	Assists per game	SPG	Steals per game
BPG	Blocks per game	PPG	Points per game	**Bold**	Career high

=== College ===
Year	Team	GP	GS	MPG	FG%	3P%	FT%	RPG	APG	SPG	BPG	PPG
2014–15	Arizona	34	0	9.6	**.453**	.391	.647	1.4	1.8	.3	.0	2.9
2015–16	Arizona	34	6	21.2	.401	.375	.649	1.6	3.4	.6	**.2**	5.2
2016–17	Arizona	31	10	24.9	.429	**.423**	.704	**2.5**	4.1	1.2	.1	5.9
2017–18	Arizona	**35**	**35**	**32.0**	.437	.417	**.746**	2.4	**4.5**	**1.4**	.1	**7.8**
Career		134	51	22.0	.428	.406	.691	2.0	3.4	.9	.1	5.5

== Music career ==
Jackson-Cartwright releases punk rock and hip hop music under the stage name Blvck Minoh. In December 2023, he announced that he was working on his debut extended play, #AGNDA.

== Personal life ==
Jackson-Cartwright is the son of Belinda and Ramon. His older brother Miles played college basketball at Penn and professionally. He has an older sister, Briana, who is a musician and performs under the name Jack Davey. His father died in 2022.

In 2026, Jackson-Cartwright commenced the process of acquiring New Zealand citizenship.
