= Matt Mooney =

American basketball player (born 1997)

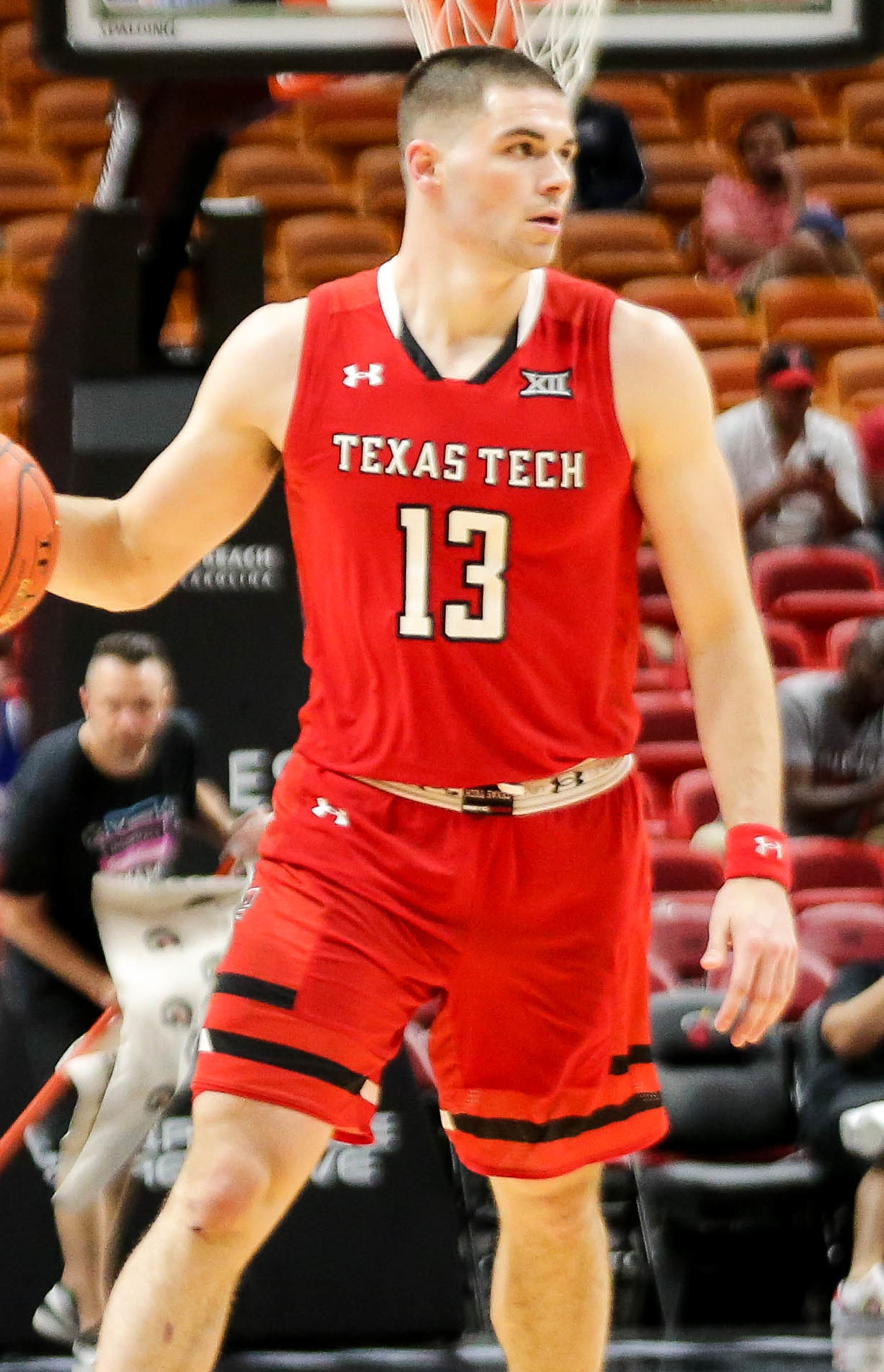
- Mooney in December 2018

Free agent
- Position: Shooting guard

Personal information
- Born: February 7, 1995 (age 31) Chicago, Illinois, U.S.
- Listed height: 6 ft 2 in (1.88 m)
- Listed weight: 199 lb (90 kg)

Career information
- High school: Notre Dame College Prep (Niles, Illinois)
- College: Air Force (2014–2015); South Dakota (2016–2018); Texas Tech (2018–2019)
- NBA draft: 2019: undrafted
- Playing career: 2019–present

Career history
- 2019–2020: Memphis Hustle
- 2020: Cleveland Cavaliers
- 2020: →Canton Charge
- 2021: Raptors 905
- 2021: Mexico City Capitanes
- 2021–2022: New York Knicks
- 2022: Unicaja
- 2022: Niners Chemnitz
- 2022–2023: Beşiktaş
- 2023: Darüşşafaka
- 2023–2024: Samsunspor
- 2024: Dolomiti Energia Trento
- 2024–2025: New Zealand Breakers
- 2025: Piratas de Quebradillas

Career highlights
- Second-team All-Big 12 (2019); Big 12 All-Defensive Team (2019); Big 12 All-Newcomer Team (2019); 2× First-team All-Summit League (2017, 2018); Summit League Transfer of the Year (2017); Summit League All-Newcomer Team (2017)
- Stats at NBA.com
- Stats at Basketball Reference

Matthew Marren Mooney (born February 7, 1995) is an American professional basketball player who last played for the New Zealand Breakers of the Australian National Basketball League (NBL). He played college basketball for the Texas Tech Red Raiders and South Dakota having transferred after his freshman year at Air Force.

== Early life ==
Mooney has a younger brother Joe who is also a basketball player. He attended Notre Dame College Prep and commuted two hours from Wauconda, Illinois to play under coach Tom Les. Mooney was lightly recruited. He had two college offers coming out of high school and signed with Air Force.

== College career ==
Mooney averaged 6.9 points per game as a freshman at Air Force. However, he had trouble getting adjusted to the strictness of the military culture and experienced bullying. After the season, he opted to transfer.

After sitting out a season, Mooney averaged 18.6 points per game as a sophomore for South Dakota, leading the team to a regular season championship. He was named to the First–team All-Summit League and newcomer of the year. As a junior, Mooney averaged 18.7 points, 4.1 rebounds and 3.1 assists. He was named to the First–team All-Summit League again. He had 31 points in a loss to TCU and 30 points in a loss to South Dakota State in the Summit League championship. Following the season, Mooney opted to transfer as a graduate student, selecting Texas Tech over offers from Northwestern and Creighton.

Texas Tech was coming off a season in which the team reached the Elite Eight but lost some important pieces. Mooney averaged 11 points per game and shot 38 percent from behind the arc. He partnered with Jarrett Culver to help the team reach its first-ever Final Four. Mooney scored 17 points in an upset of Gonzaga in the Elite Eight. In Texas Tech's first Final Four appearance on April 6, 2019, Mooney scored 22 points in Texas Tech's 61–51 defeat of Michigan State to advance to the 2019 NCAA Men's Basketball Championship game. Texas Tech would lose the championship game to Virginia 85–77 in overtime. Mooney was then named to the 2019 All-Tournament Team.

== Professional career ==
=== Memphis Hustle (2019–2020) ===
After going undrafted in the 2019 NBA draft, Mooney joined the Atlanta Hawks' Summer League roster.

On September 4, 2019, Mooney signed an Exhibit 10 contract with the Memphis Grizzlies, but was waived on October 14. He was named to the roster of the Grizzlies’ NBA G League affiliate, the Memphis Hustle.

=== Cleveland Cavaliers (2020) ===
On January 15, 2020, Mooney was signed to a two-way contract by the Cleveland Cavaliers. Under the terms of the deal, he will split time between the Cavs and their G League affiliate, the Canton Charge. He made his NBA debut on January 20, recording two points, a rebound and an assist in three minutes in a 106–86 loss to the New York Knicks. Mooney was waived on December 19, 2020.

=== Raptors 905 (2021) ===
On January 27, 2021, Mooney signed with Raptors 905. He averaged 11.6 points and 5.7 assists per game.

=== Mexico City Capitanes (2021) ===
On October 24, 2021, Mooney signed with the Mexico City Capitanes of the NBA G League. In 12 games, he averaged 15.2 points, 4.6 assists, 4.3 rebounds and 2.17 steals over 32.8 minutes per game.

=== New York Knicks (2021–2022) ===
On December 21, 2021, Mooney signed a 10-day contract with the New York Knicks. He signed a second 10-day contract with the Knicks on December 31. Mooney played one game for the Knicks and had one steal.

=== Unicaja (2022) ===
On January 31, 2022, Mooney signed with Unicaja of the Liga ACB.

=== Niners Chemnitz (2022) ===
On August 12, 2022, Mooney signed with Niners Chemnitz of the Basketball Bundesliga (BBL).

=== Beşiktaş (2022–2023) ===
On October 7, 2022, Mooney signed with Beşiktaş Emlakjet of the Basketbol Süper Ligi (BSL).

=== Darüşşafaka (2023) ===
On January 29, 2023, Mooney signed with Darüşşafaka Lassa of the Basketball Super League (BSL).

=== Samsunspor (2023–2024) ===
On July 12, 2023, Mooney signed with Reeder Samsunspor of the Turkish Basketbol Süper Ligi (BSL).

=== Aquila Basket Trento (2024) ===
On February 1, 2024, Mooney signed with Dolomiti Energia Trento of the Italian Lega Basket Serie A (LBA).

=== New Zealand Breakers (2024–2025) ===
On August 9, 2024, Mooney signed with the New Zealand Breakers of the Australian National Basketball League (NBL) for the 2024–25 season.

== Career statistics ==
Legend
GP	Games played	GS	Games started	MPG	Minutes per game
FG%	Field goal percentage	3P%	3-point field goal percentage	FT%	Free throw percentage
RPG	Rebounds per game	APG	Assists per game	SPG	Steals per game
BPG	Blocks per game	PPG	Points per game	**Bold**	Career high

=== NBA ===
==== Regular season ====
Year	Team	GP	GS	MPG	FG%	3P%	FT%	RPG	APG	SPG	BPG	PPG
2019–20	Cleveland	**4**	0	**4.8**	**.250**	.000	–	**.8**	**.3**	.5	**.3**	**.5**
2021–22	New York	1	0	2.0	.000	.000	—	.0	.0	**1.0**	.0	.0
Career		5	0	4.2	.200	.000	—	.6	.2	.6	.2	.4

=== College ===
Year	Team	GP	GS	MPG	FG%	3P%	FT%	RPG	APG	SPG	BPG	PPG
2014–15	Air Force	29	8	19.2	.448	.387	.786	1.9	1.8	.8	**.1**	6.9
2016–17	South Dakota	34	34	**31.1**	**.460**	.367	.717	**4.5**	2.1	**2.2**	**.1**	18.6
2017–18	South Dakota	34	34	30.6	.445	.352	**.829**	4.1	3.1	2.0	**.1**	**18.7**
2018–19	Texas Tech	**38**	**38**	31.0	.426	**.386**	.782	3.1	**3.3**	1.8	**.1**	11.3
Career		135	114	28.4	.446	.368	.772	3.4	2.6	1.7	.1	14.1
