= Freddie Gillespie =

American basketball player (born 1997)

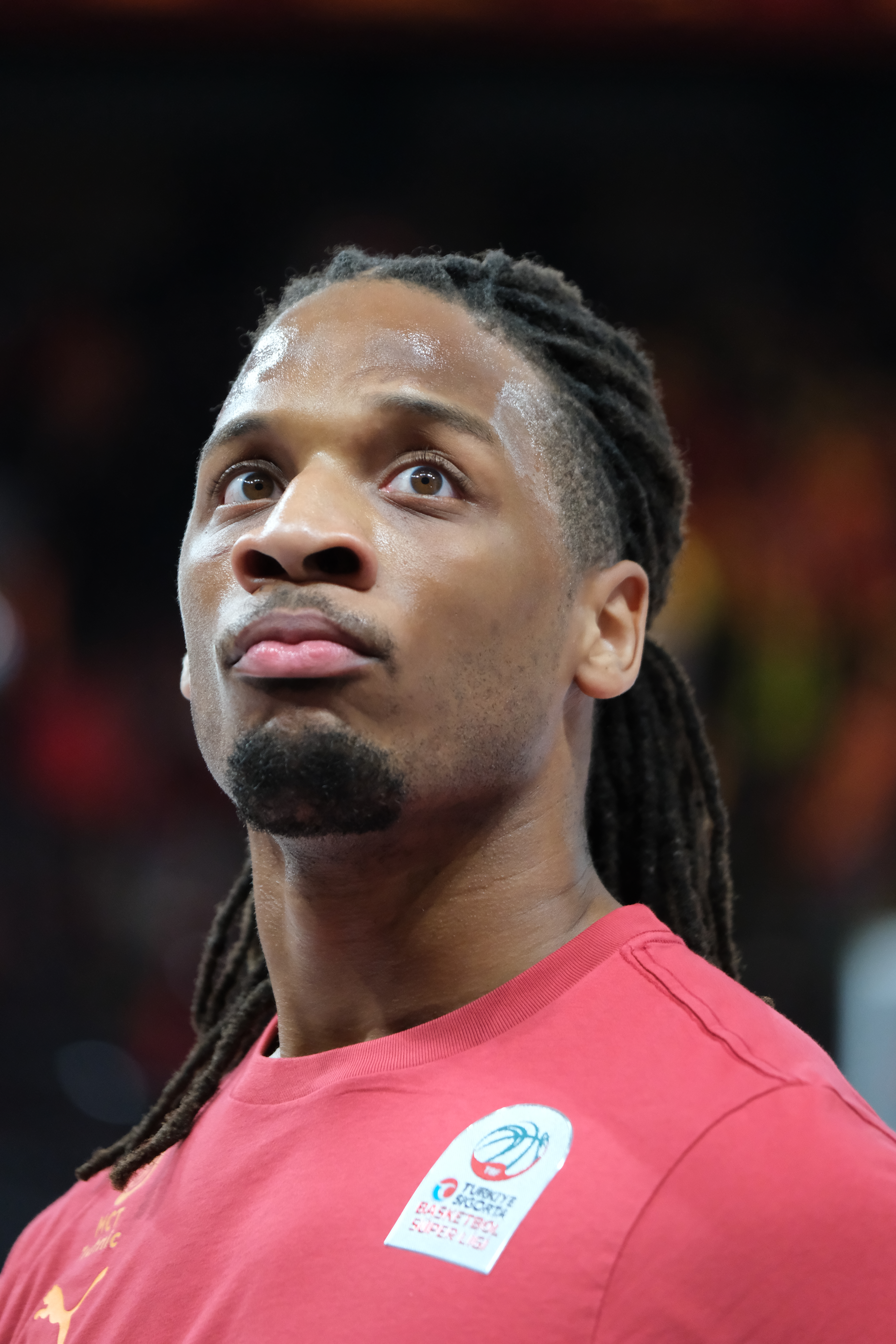
- Gillespie with Galatasaray in 2025

No. 33 – Ironi Ness Ziona
- Position: Center
- League: Israeli Basketball Premier League

Personal information
- Born: June 14, 1997 (age 29) Saint Paul, Minnesota, U.S.
- Listed height: 6 ft 9 in (2.06 m)
- Listed weight: 245 lb (111 kg)

Career information
- High school: East Ridge (Woodbury, Minnesota)
- College: Carleton (2015–2017); Baylor (2018–2020)
- NBA draft: 2020: undrafted
- Playing career: 2020–present

Career history
- 2021: Memphis Hustle
- 2021: Toronto Raptors
- 2021: Memphis Hustle
- 2021–2022: Orlando Magic
- 2022: Memphis Hustle
- 2022–2023: Bayern Munich
- 2023–2024: Crvena zvezda
- 2024: New Zealand Breakers
- 2024–2025: Olimpia Milano
- 2025–2026: Galatasaray
- 2026–present: Ironi Ness Ziona

Career highlights
- ABA League champion (2024); Serbian League champion (2024); Serbian Cup winner (2024); German Cup winner (2023); Big 12 Most Improved Player (2020); Second-team All-Big 12 (2020); Big 12 All-Defensive Team (2020); Second-team All-MIAC (2017); MIAC All-Defensive Team (2017)
- Stats at NBA.com
- Stats at Basketball Reference

Frederick Gillespie (born June 14, 1997) is an American professional basketball player for Ironi Ness Ziona of the Israeli Basketball Premier League.

He began his college basketball career at Division III Carleton College, where he earned second-team All-MIAC honors in 2017. Gillespie then transferred as a walk-on to the Baylor Bears. As a redshirt senior at Baylor in 2020, he was named Big 12 Most Improved Player, second-team All-Big 12, and to the Big 12 All-Defensive Team.

Gillespie began his professional career in the NBA G League with the Memphis Hustle, and played in the National Basketball Association (NBA) for the Toronto Raptors and Orlando Magic. He subsequently played overseas, winning the German Cup with Bayern Munich in 2023 and capturing an ABA League, Serbian League, and Radivoj Korać Cup treble with Crvena zvezda in 2024.

== Early life ==
Gillespie grew up in Saint Paul, Minnesota. He played football growing up, until trying basketball in eighth grade.

He entered East Ridge High School while he was 5' 11", and did not play basketball his freshman year, after breaking his ankle on the first day of team tryouts. He grew to 6' 4" (1.93 m) by the time he was a sophomore, and subsequently played on the junior varsity team. Gillespie played varsity ball as a junior, but tore his ACL late in the season, causing him to miss the summer AAU circuit. He returned to the court healthy in his senior season. After he did not receive any Division I or II scholarship offers, Gillespie opted to attend Division III Carleton College.

== College career ==
=== Carleton ===
Gillespie started his collegiate career at Division III Carleton College. He played only 16 total minutes in his true freshman season despite being, in his words, “the most athletic, biggest guy in that whole conference."

As a sophomore, in 27 games Gillespie averaged 22.8 minutes, 10.0 points, 8.3 rebounds, and 2.6 blocks per game, shooting 53.2 percent from the field. He was named second-team All-Minnesota Intercollegiate Athletic Conference, as well as to the MIAC All-Defensive Team.

=== Baylor ===
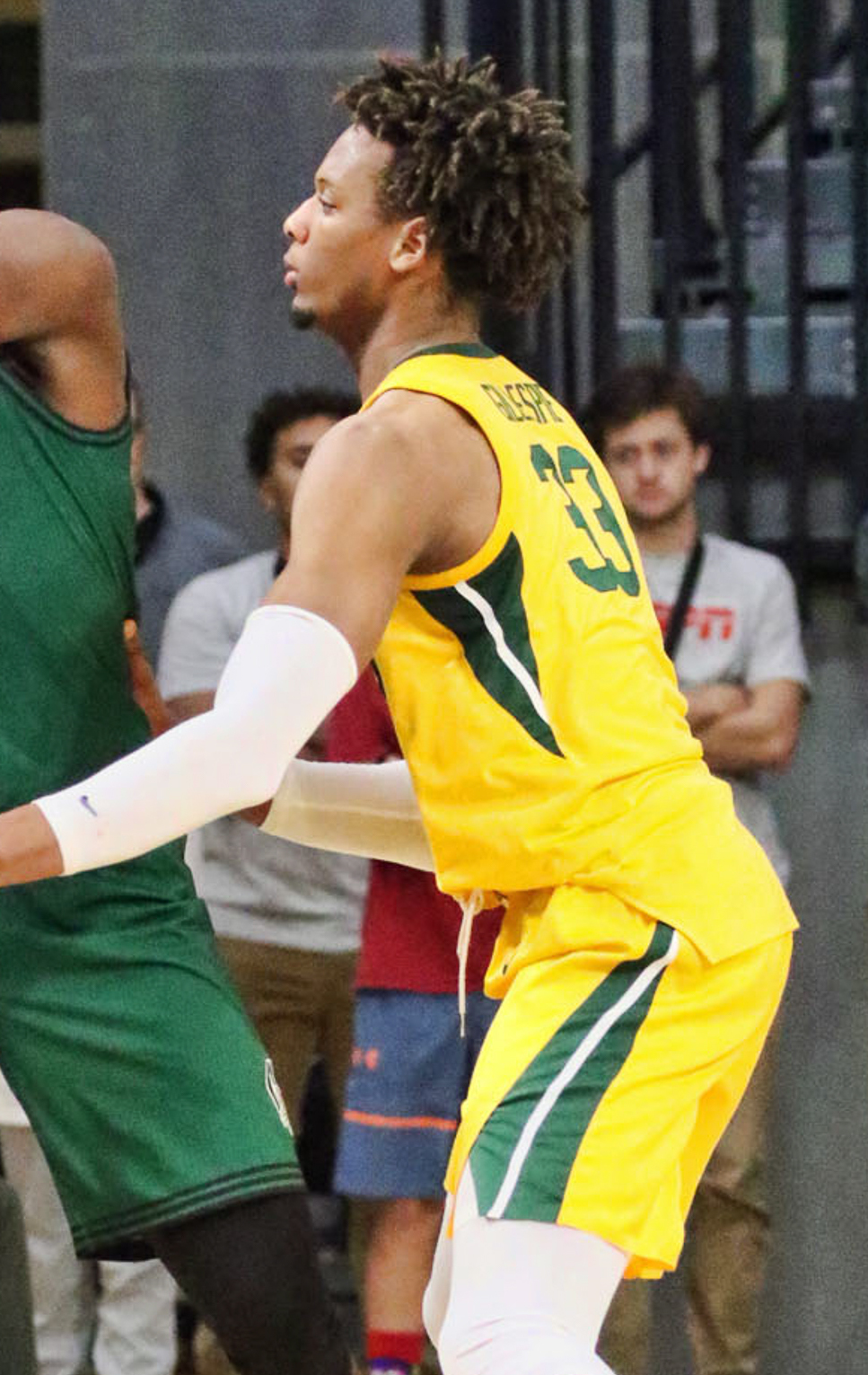
Gillespie playing for Baylor in 2019

Following the season, he decided to attempt to transfer to a Division I program. A friend of Gillespie's mother, former Minnesota player and assistant coach Al Nuness, was able to put him in contact with Baylor coach Scott Drew through his son, Jared Nuness, a member of the Baylor coaching staff.

Gillespie joined the Baylor basketball team as a walk-on, sitting out a year due to NCAA transfer rules and then earning a scholarship in May 2018.

As a redshirt junior in 2018-19, in 26 games Gillespie averaged 18.3 minutes, 5.3 points, 4.4 rebounds, and 1.1 blocks per game, shooting 65.2% from the field.

On December 9, 2019, Gillespie was named Big 12 Player of the Week after contributing 17 points, 13 rebounds, and five blocks in a win over Arizona. In the 2019-20 regular season, Gillespie started all 30 games and averaged 28.4 minutes, 9.6 points, 9.1 rebounds, 1.1 steals, and 2.2 blocks per game, while shooting 55.0% from the field. He was named Big 12 Most Improved Player, Second Team All-Big 12, and to the All-Defensive Team.

== Professional career ==
=== Memphis Hustle (2021) ===
After going undrafted in the 2020 NBA draft, Gillespie signed a training camp contract with the Dallas Mavericks, but he didn't make the final roster.

On January 11, 2021, the Memphis Hustle selected Gillespie with the 2nd pick overall in the 2020–2021 NBA G League draft. In 15 games, he averaged 10.5 points, 10.3 rebounds, and 2.3 blocks in 27.8 minutes per game while shooting .570 from the field and recording six double-doubles.

=== Toronto Raptors (2021) ===
On April 8, 2021, Gillespie signed a 10-day contract with the Toronto Raptors. Two days later, he made his debut with the Raptors, recording six points, four rebounds, one assist, three steals, and one block in 18 minutes during a 135–115 win against the Cleveland Cavaliers. On April 14, in a 122–117 win over the San Antonio Spurs, he scored 9 points, grabbed 8 rebounds, and recorded 2 blocks, all career-highs. Two days later, he reached a new career-high of 10 points, with seven rebounds, in a 113–102 win against the Orlando Magic. On April 18, Gillespie signed a second 10-day contract, and tied his career-high with 10 points, two rebounds, one assist, and one steal, going 4-of-4 from the field in a 112–106 win against the Oklahoma City Thunder. Three days later, he had four points, five rebounds, and a career-high five blocks in a 114–103 win against the Brooklyn Nets. On April 28, Gillespie signed for the remainder of the season. On May 2, 2021, Gillespie had a new career-high of 11 points, with seven rebounds and one steal, in a 121–114 win over the Los Angeles Lakers. For the season for the Raptors, in 20 games he averaged 19.6 minutes, 5.5 points, and 4.8 rebounds per game, while shooting 52.4% from the floor.

On October 13, 2021, Gillespie was waived by the Raptors.

=== Return to the Hustle (2021) ===
On October 23, 2021, Gillespie re-signed with the Memphis Hustle. In 12 games, he averaged 11.4 points, 12.2 rebounds, 1.0 assists, 2.8 blocks, and 1.2 steals in 33.2 minutes per game, leading the team in rebounding and leading the league in blocked shots.

=== Orlando Magic (2021–2022) ===
On December 21, 2021, Gillespie signed a 10-day contract via the hardship exception with the Orlando Magic. He signed a second 10-day contract with the team on December 31. For the season with the Magic, in 9 games he averaged 13.2 minutes, 2.3 points, 4.0 rebounds, and 1.0 blocks per game.

=== Third stint with the Memphis Hustle (2022) ===
On January 10, 2022, Gillespie was reacquired and activated by the Memphis Hustle following the expiration of his second 10-day contract with the Orlando Magic. In 34 regular-season games during the remainder of the 2021–22 G League season, he averaged 25.1 minutes, 9.9 points, 8.4 rebounds, and 1.8 blocks per game while shooting 58.3% from the field.

=== Bayern Munich (2022–2023) ===
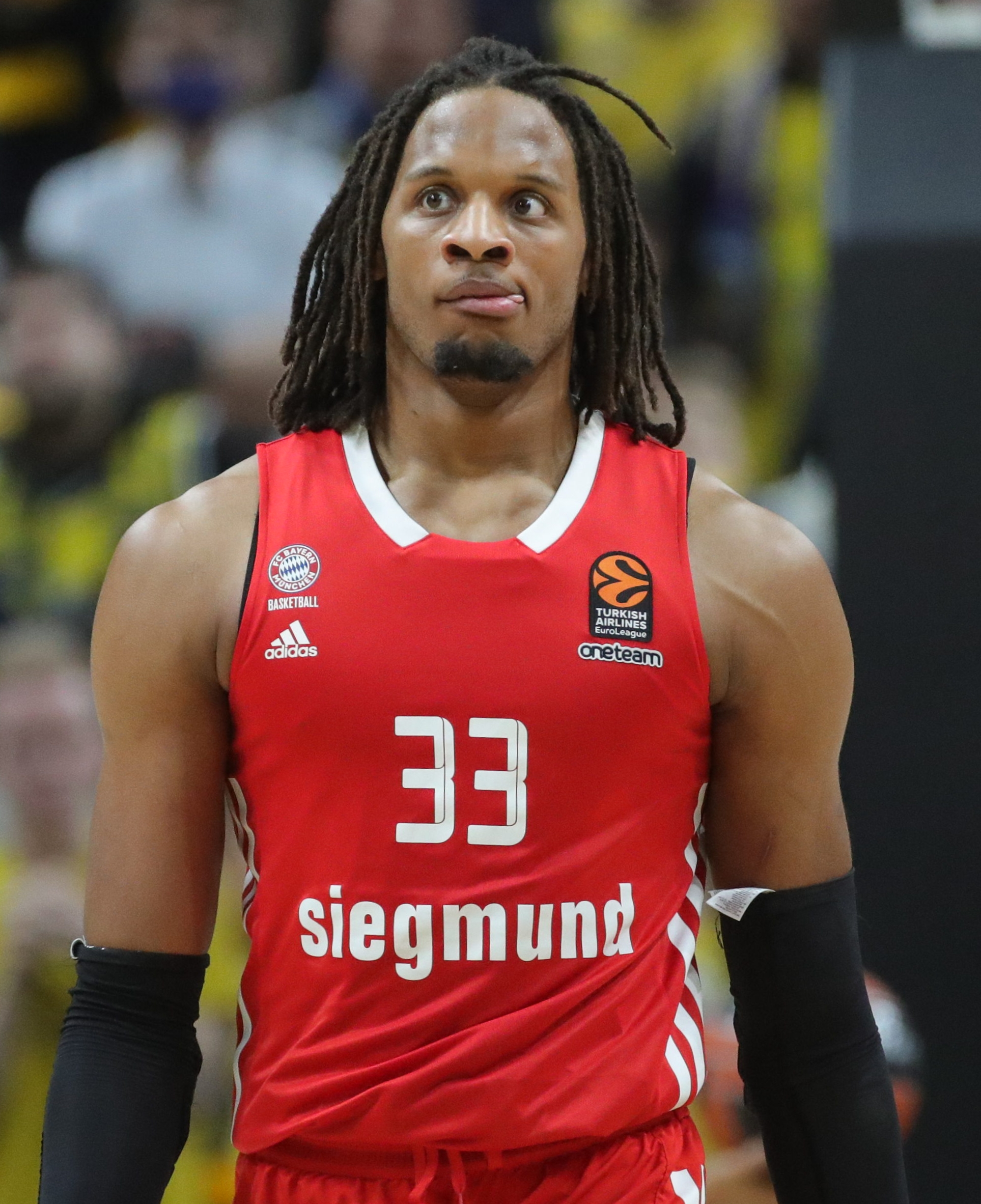
Gillespie with Bayern München in 2022

On July 25, 2022, Gillespie signed with Bayern Munich of the German Basketball Bundesliga until 2024. In February 2023, he helped the team win the German Cup. For the 2022–23 season with the team, in 75 games across all competitions he averaged 20.0 minutes, 5.2 points, 6.4 rebounds, and 1.0 blocks per game, while shooting 54.9% from the field.

=== Crvena zvezda (2023–2024) ===
On December 18, 2023, Gillespie left Bayern Munich and signed with Serbian club Crvena zvezda for the remainder of the 2023–24 season. During his stint in Belgrade, he helped the team win the ABA League, the Serbian League, and the Radivoj Korać Cup. Across 15 EuroLeague games with Crvena zvezda, he averaged 8.1 minutes, 2.5 points, and 1.9 rebounds per game, while shooting 59.3% from the floor. On June 10, 2024, he parted ways with the team upon the expiration of his contract.

=== New Zealand Breakers (2024) ===
On July 25, 2024, Gillespie signed with the New Zealand Breakers of the Australian National Basketball League (NBL) for the 2024–25 season. On September 15, he received a one-game suspension for the season opener after headbutting Shaun Bruce of the Sydney Kings late in the fourth quarter during an NBL Blitz pre-season game. He was granted his request for a release from his contract on November 18, 2024. In nine NBL games with the club, Gillespie averaged 18.9 minutes, 6.9 points, 5.3 rebounds, and 1.8 blocks per game while shooting 67.5% from the field.

=== Olimpia Milano (2024-2025) ===
On November 19, 2024, Gillespie signed with Italian team Olimpia Milano for the remainder of the 2024-25 season.

On March 6, 2025, early in the second half of a EuroLeague game against Fenerbahçe, Gillespie suffered a blow to the head after colliding with Devon Hall while diving for a loose ball. He was unconsciousness for a few seconds, and was carried off the court on a stretcher. He was discharged from the hospital the next morning without complications. In 34 regular-season games in the EuroLeague and Lega Basket Serie A, he averaged 13.5 minutes, 3.8 points, and 2.9 rebounds per game.

=== Galatasaray (2025–2026) ===
On September 22, 2025, Gillespie signed with Galatasaray. For the 2025-26 season with the team, in 46 games he averaged 19.3 minutes, 5.1 points, 5.2 rebounds, 1.2 steals, and 1.3 blocks per game, while shooting 54.0% from the field.

=== Ironi Ness Ziona (2026-present) ===
On August 10, 2026, Gillespie signed with Ironi Ness Ziona of the Israeli Basketball Premier League.

== Career statistics ==
Legend
GP	Games played	GS	Games started	MPG	Minutes per game
FG%	Field-goal percentage	3P%	3-point field-goal percentage	FT%	Free-throw percentage
RPG	Rebounds per game	APG	Assists per game	SPG	Steals per game
BPG	Blocks per game	PPG	Points per game	PIR	Performance index rating
**Bold**	Career high

=== NBA ===
==== Regular season ====
Year	Team	GP	GS	MPG	FG%	3P%	FT%	RPG	APG	SPG	BPG	PPG
2020–21	Toronto	**20**	**2**	**19.6**	**.524**	—	**.697**	**4.8**	.4	**.6**	**1.0**	**5.5**
2021–22	Orlando	9	**2**	13.2	.409	.000	.429	4.0	**.6**	.3	**1.0**	2.3
Career		29	4	17.6	.500	.000	.650	4.6	.5	.5	1.0	4.5

=== EuroLeague ===
Year	Team	GP	GS	MPG	FG%	3P%	FT%	RPG	APG	SPG	BPG	PPG	PIR
2022–23	Bayern Munich	**34**	**26**	**18.9**	.493	—	.361	**6.0**	.4	**.6**	**1.0**	**4.3**	**6.9**
2023–24	Bayern Munich	13	3	9.2	.500	—	**.750**	2.4	.2	.2	.3	2.2	2.3
2023–24	Crvena zvezda	15	0	8.1	**.593**	—	.462	1.9	**.5**	.3	.5	2.5	2.7
Career		62	29	14.3	.508	—	.415	4.3	.4	.5	.7	3.5	4.9

=== Domestic leagues ===
Year	Team	League	GP	MPG	FG%	3P%	FT%	RPG	APG	SPG	BPG	PPG
2020–21	(United States) Memphis Hustle	G League	15	27.8	.570	.000	.421	10.3	1.8	1.3	2.3	10.5
2021–22	(United States) Memphis Hustle	G League	22	20.8	.606	.400	.680	6.0	.9	.9	1.2	9.1
2022–23	(Germany) Bayern Munich	BBL	37	20.3	.578	—	.451	6.6	.5	1.1	1.1	5.8
2023–24	(Germany) Bayern Munich	BBL	4	11.6	.625	—	.500	4.0	.2	.5	.2	3.2
2023–24	(Serbia) Crvena zvezda	ABA	18	9.8	.644	—	.600	3.1	.2	.6	.5	3.7

=== College ===
==== NCAA Division I ====
Year	Team	GP	GS	MPG	FG%	3P%	FT%	RPG	APG	SPG	BPG	PPG
2017–18	Baylor	Redshirt										
2018–19	Baylor	26	11	18.3	**.652**	—	.531	4.4	.3	.7	1.1	5.3
2019–20	Baylor	**30**	**30**	**28.4**	.550	—	**.684**	**9.0**	**.5**	**1.1**	**2.2**	**9.6**
Career		56	41	23.7	.582	—	.646	6.9	.4	.9	1.7	7.6

==== NCAA Division III ====
Year	Team	GP	GS	MPG	FG%	3P%	FT%	RPG	APG	SPG	BPG	PPG
2015–16	Carleton	4	0	4.0	.500	—	.250	1.8	.3	.3	.5	1.0
2016–17	Carleton	**27**	**23**	**22.8**	**.532**	—	**.583**	**8.3**	**.8**	**.6**	**2.6**	**10.0**
Career		31	23	20.4	.532	—	.544	7.5	.7	.5	2.3	8.8
