= Karim López =

Mexican basketball player (born 2007)

No. 35 – Memphis Grizzlies
- Position: Small forward
- League: NBA

Personal information
- Born: 12 April 2007 (age 19) Hermosillo, Sonora, Mexico
- Listed height: 6 ft 8 in (2.03 m)
- Listed weight: 210 lb (95 kg)

Career information
- NBA draft: 2026: 1st round, 21st overall pick
- Drafted by: Detroit Pistons
- Playing career: 2024–present

Career history
- 2024: Joventut Badalona
- 2024–2026: New Zealand Breakers
- 2026–present: Memphis Grizzlies
- 2026: →Memphis Hustle

Career highlights
- NBL Ignite Cup winner (2026)
- Stats at NBA.com
- Stats at Basketball Reference

Karim Hiram López Mondaca (born 12 April 2007) is a Mexican professional basketball player for the Memphis Grizzlies of the National Basketball Association (NBA). After playing for Joventut Badalona and the New Zealand Breakers between 2024 and 2026, López was selected with the 21st overall pick by the Detroit Pistons in the 2026 NBA draft.

== Early life ==
López was born on 12 April 2007, in Hermosillo, Sonora, Mexico. His father, Jesús Hiram López, played for the Mexico national basketball team. After first trying out football and taekwondo, he began playing basketball from a young age. He began training seriously for basketball at age 12 with the encouragement of his father, and was able to play against players up to five years older than him and still "held his own". At the age of 14, he received an offer to play professionally in Spain for the club Joventut Badalona, and left his family to move there.

== Professional career ==
López played two seasons for Joventut Badalona's "B" team, from 2022 to 2024. He was promoted to the senior squad in 2024 and appeared in four games during the 2023–24 season, scoring two points. After the 2023–24 season, he left Joventut and signed with the New Zealand Breakers of the Australian National Basketball League (NBL) in August 2024 as a Next Star. He impressed for the Breakers, becoming the youngest player in NBL history to record a double-double that October. Appearing in 25 games during the 2024–25 season, he averaged 9.6 points and 4.7 rebounds.

On 30 January 2026, López scored a career-high 32 points in the Breakers' 97–95 win over Melbourne United. In the 2025–26 NBL season, the Breakers finished outside the finals spots in seventh at the end of the regular season but won the inaugural NBL Ignite Cup Final, defeating the Adelaide 36ers 111–107 behind López's 12 points, eight rebounds, five assists and two steals.

On 23 March 2026, López declared for the NBA draft, where he was regarded as a top prospect.

On 23 June 2026, López was selected with the 21st overall pick by the Detroit Pistons in the 2026 NBA draft. He became the first Mexican-born first-round draft pick and second Mexican-born draftee in NBA history (after Eduardo Nájera). He was then immediately traded to the Memphis Grizzlies, along with three future second-round picks, in exchange for Ebuka Okorie.

== National team career ==
López competed for Mexico at the 2022 Centrobasket U15 Championship. He then played at the 2023 FIBA Under-16 Americas Championship, notably scoring 23 points in a loss to the United States team. He played for the senior national team in 2024 during the Olympic qualification tournament.
