= Jordan Hunter (basketball, born 1997) =

Australian basketball player

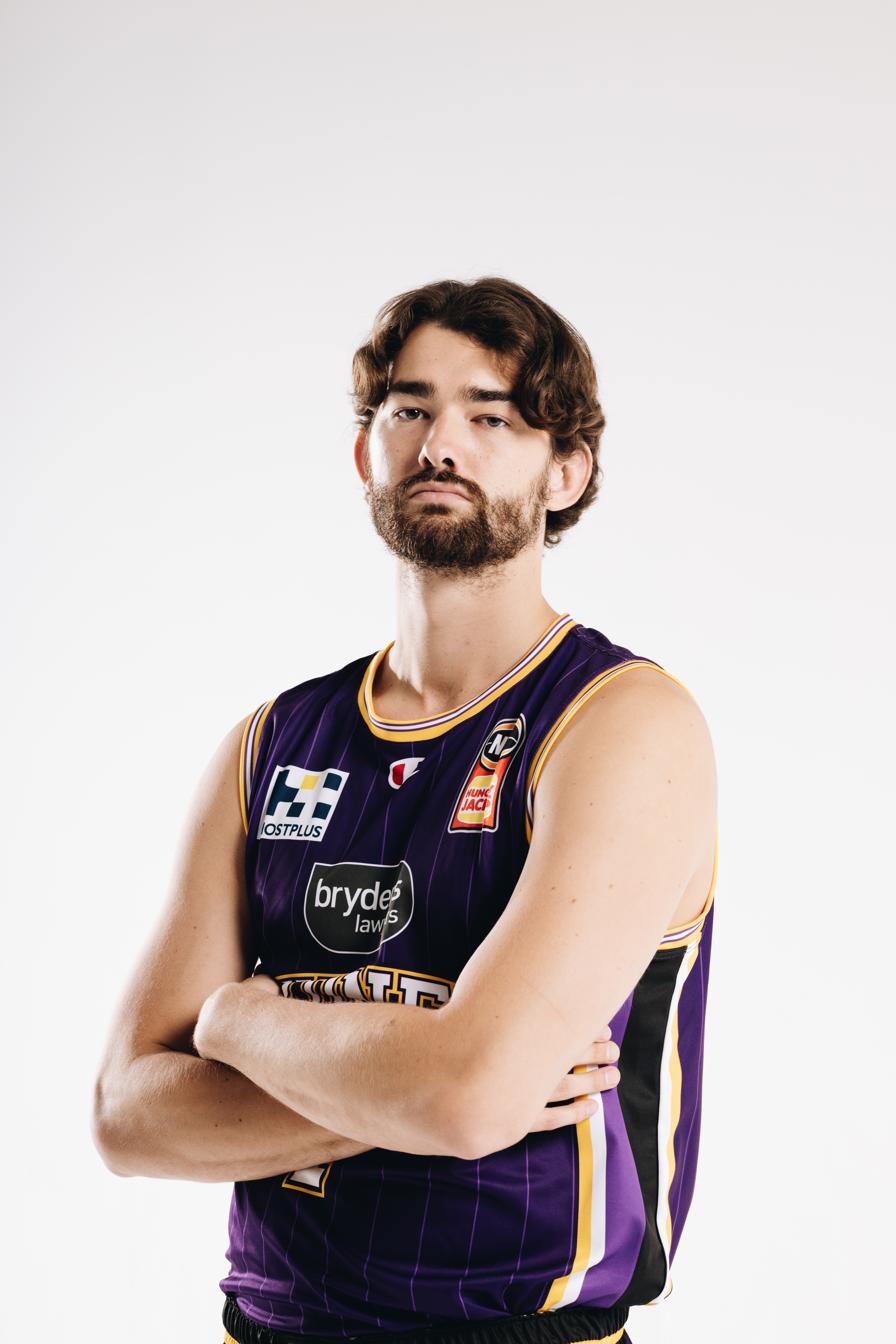
- Hunter with the Sydney Kings in 2021

No. 1 – South East Melbourne Phoenix
- Position: Center
- League: NBL

Personal information
- Born: 30 January 1997 (age 29) Sydney, New South Wales, Australia
- Listed height: 213 cm (7 ft 0 in)
- Listed weight: 109 kg (240 lb)

Career information
- High school: Saint Ignatius' College (Sydney, New South Wales)
- College: Saint Mary's (2015–2019)
- Playing career: 2015–present

Career history
- 2015: BA Centre of Excellence
- 2019–2024: Sydney Kings
- 2020: Norths Bears
- 2022: North Gold Coast Seahawks
- 2024: Rīgas Zeļļi
- 2024–present: South East Melbourne Phoenix
- 2025: Santeros de Aguada
- 2026: Knox Raiders

Career highlights
- 2× NBL champion (2022, 2023); Waratah League MVP (2020); Waratah League All-Star Five (2020); WCC tournament MVP (2019)

Jordan Miles Hunter (born 30 January 1997) is an Australian professional basketball player for the South East Melbourne Phoenix of the National Basketball League (NBL). He played college basketball for the Saint Mary's Gaels.

== Early life ==
Hunter was born in Sydney, New South Wales, in the suburb of St Leonards. He grew up in the suburb of Vaucluse and attended Saint Ignatius' College in Riverview.

In 2015, Hunter moved to Canberra where he played for the BA Centre of Excellence in the South East Australian Basketball League.

== College career ==
Between 2015 and 2019, Hunter played college basketball in the United States for the Saint Mary's Gaels. He was used sparingly over his first three seasons before seeing his minutes more than triple from his junior season to his senior season. As a senior in 2018–19, he averaged 7.9 points, 6.7 rebounds, 1.0 assists and 1.4 blocks, as he started all 34 games and averaged 23.3 minutes per game. He was named the 2019 WCC tournament MVP and was named to the WCC's All-Academic Team.

== Professional career ==
Hunter joined the Sydney Kings of the National Basketball League for the 2019–20 season. He played 27 games in his rookie season and helped the Kings to a grand final berth.

After a stint with the Norths Bears in the Waratah League in 2020, where he won league MVP, Hunter returned to the Kings for the 2020–21 NBL season and finished runner-up for NBL Most Improved Player. He led the Kings in total rebounds with 227 at 6.3 per game, playing 36 games including 33 starts.

The 2021 off-season saw Hunter sustain a finger fracture and then a season-ending navicular fracture. He missed the entire 2021–22 NBL season, as the Kings won the 2022 NBL championship. After playing for the North Gold Coast Seahawks of the NBL1 North in the 2022 NBL1 season, Hunter made his return for the Kings in the 2022–23 NBL season and won his second championship. He played a fifth season with the Kings in 2023–24.

Following the NBL season, Hunter moved to Latvia to play for Rīgas Zeļļi of the Latvian–Estonian Basketball League (LEBL) for the rest of the 2023–24 season.

On 18 April 2024, Hunter signed a three-year deal with the South East Melbourne Phoenix. Following the 2024–25 NBL season, he joined Santeros de Aguada of the Baloncesto Superior Nacional for the 2025 season.

With the Phoenix in the 2025–26 NBL season, Hunter averaged a career-high 11.7 points per game. He joined the Knox Raiders of the NBL1 South for the 2026 NBL1 season.

In September 2026, Hunter was named co-captain of the Phoenix alongside Nathan Sobey for the third straight season.

== National team career ==
Hunter played for the Australian national junior program in 2014 and 2015. He debuted for the Australian Boomers during the 2025 FIBA Asia Cup qualifiers in 2024.

In October 2025, Hunter was named in the Boomers squad for the first window of the FIBA Basketball World Cup 2027 Asian Qualifiers.
