= Matthew Hurt =

American basketball player (born 2000)

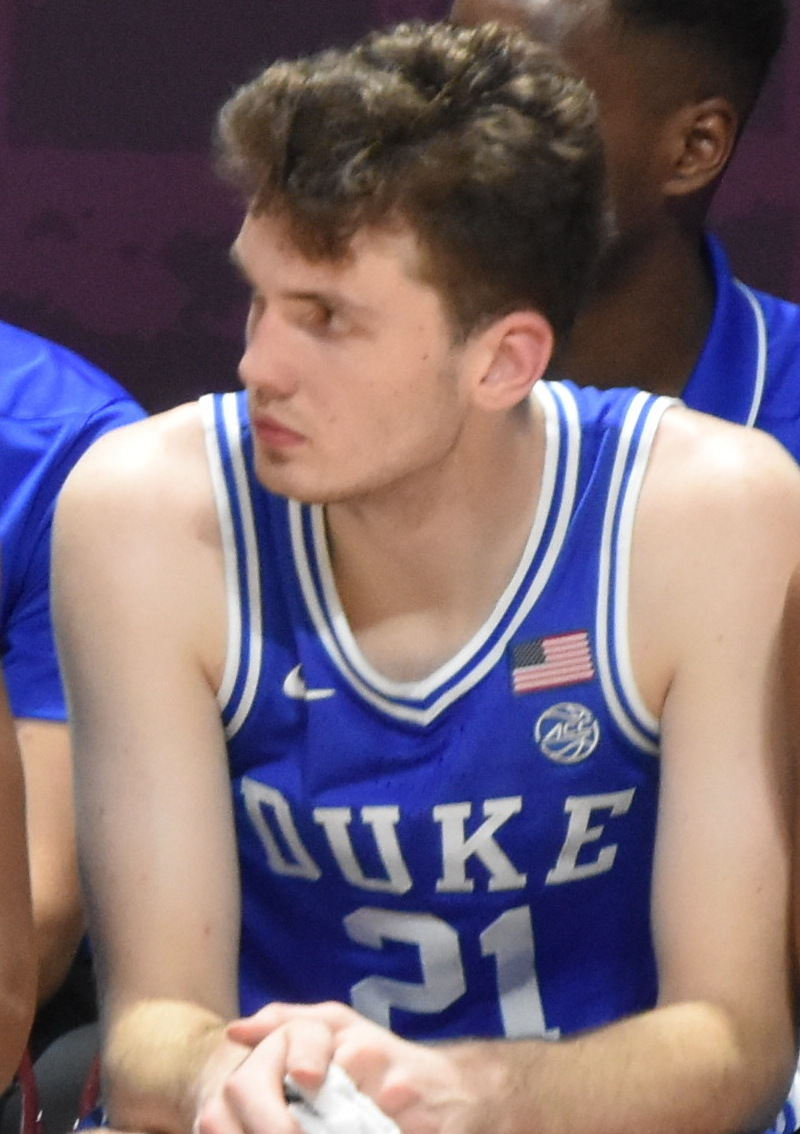
- Hurt with Duke in 2019

No. 21 – Cedevita Olimpija
- Position: Power forward
- League: Slovenian League; ABA League; EuroCup

Personal information
- Born: April 20, 2000 (age 26) Rochester, Minnesota, U.S.
- Listed height: 6 ft 9 in (2.06 m)
- Listed weight: 233 lb (106 kg)

Career information
- High school: John Marshall (Rochester, Minnesota)
- College: Duke (2019–2021)
- NBA draft: 2021: undrafted
- Playing career: 2021–present

Career history
- 2021–2024: Memphis Hustle
- 2024: Memphis Grizzlies
- 2024–2025: South East Melbourne Phoenix
- 2025: Trapani Shark
- 2026–present: Cedevita Olimpija

Career highlights
- All-NBL First Team (2025); First-team All-ACC (2021); ACC Most Improved Player (2021); McDonald's All-American (2019); Minnesota Mr. Basketball (2019)
- Stats at NBA.com
- Stats at Basketball Reference
Medals
Men's basketball
Representing United States
FIBA Americas U18 Championship
Gold medal – first place	2018 Canada	Team

Matthew Christopher Hurt (born April 20, 2000) is an American professional basketball player for Cedevita Olimpija of the Slovenian League, the ABA League and the EuroCup. He played college basketball for the Duke Blue Devils.

== High school career ==
Hurt attended John Marshall High School in Rochester, Minnesota for four years. As a freshman in 2015–16, helped his team to a 26–4 record. As a sophomore in 2016–17, helped his team to a 25–4 record. As a junior in 2017–18, averaged 33.9 points, 15.1 rebounds, 3.6 assists, and 4.3 blocks to help his team to a 26–3 record and the section title game. Hurt averaged 17.0 points, 7.0 rebounds, and 1.0 blocks per game on the Adidas Guantlet Circuit for his AAU team, D1 Minnesota. As a senior, Hurt averaged 36.8 points, 12.4 rebounds, and 5.0 assist per game and was named Minnesota Mr. Basketball. Hurt played in the 2019 McDonald's All-American Boys Game and Nike Hoop Summit.

=== Recruiting ===
On April 19, 2019, Hurt committed to Duke University, choosing Duke over other offers from North Carolina, Kentucky, and Kansas.

Hurt was rated as a five-star recruit and considered one of the best high school prospects in the 2019 class. Hurt was ranked the No. 10 overall recruit and No. 2 power forward in the 2019 high school class.

College recruiting
Name	Hometown	School	Height	Weight	Commit date
Matthew Hurt; PF	Rochester, MN	John Marshall (MN)	6 ft 8 in (2.03 m)	214 lb (97 kg)	Apr 19, 2019
Matthew Hurt; PF	Recruit ratings: Rivals: 247Sports: ESPN: (96)				
Overall recruit ranking: Rivals: 9 247Sports: 16 ESPN: 11
Note: In many cases, Scout, Rivals, 247Sports, On3, and ESPN may conflict in their listings of height and weight.; In these cases, the average was taken. ESPN grades are on a 100-point scale.; Sources: "Duke 2019 Basketball Commitments". Rivals.; "2019 Duke Blue Devils Recruiting Class". ESPN.; "2019 Team Ranking". Rivals.

== College career ==
=== Freshman season (2019–2020) ===
On November 13, Hurt scored 19 points, 3 assist, and 2 blocks in a 105–54 blowout win against Central Arkansas. On November 29, Hurt notched a career high 20 points and 8 rebounds in a 83–70 victory over Winthrop. On December 31, Hurt scored a new career-high 25 points and 4 rebounds in a 88–49 win over Boston College. For the season, he averaged 9.7 points and 3.8 rebounds in 31 games with 22 starts.

=== Sophomore season (2020–2021) ===
Before the start of his sophomore season, Hurt was named to preseason watch lists for the John R. Wooden Award, Naismith Trophy, and Karl Malone Award. On December 16, 2020, Hurt scored 18 points in a 75–65 win over Notre Dame. On January 9, 2021, Hurt scored 26 points and 6 rebounds in a 79–68 victory against Wake Forest. On January 11, 2021, Hurt was named ACC Player of the week. On February 13, 2021, Hurt scored 24 points in a 69–53 win over NC State. On February 17, 2021, Hurt put up 22 points in a 84–60 victory against Wake Forest. On February 20, 2021, Hurt scored 22 points in a 66–65 win over Virginia. On February 22, 2021, Hurt was named Atlantic Coast Conference Player of the week for the second consecutive time. At the conclusion of the regular season, Hurt averaged 18.3 points and 6.1 rebounds per game and was named ACC Most Improved Player and first-team All-ACC.

After the conclusion of his sophomore season, Hurt entered the 2021 NBA draft.

== Professional career ==
After going undrafted in the 2021 NBA draft, Hurt signed a two-way contract with the Houston Rockets on August 13, 2021, and played for the team in the NBA Summer League. He was waived by the Rockets on September 24 prior to training camp. On October 14, he signed with the Memphis Grizzlies, but was waived two days later. He subsequently joined the Memphis Hustle for the 2021–22 NBA G League season. On January 24, 2022, he was released by the Hustle.

Hurt joined the Milwaukee Bucks for the 2022 NBA Summer League. In October 2022, he had a brief pre-season stint with the Memphis Grizzlies and the re-joined the Memphis Hustle for the 2022–23 NBA G League season.

After playing for the Grizzlies in the 2023 NBA Summer League, Hurt re-signed with the team on September 30, 2023. He was waived again on October 16 and re-joined the Hustle. On January 29, 2024, Hurt signed a 10-day contract with the Grizzlies. He returned to the Hustle on February 9, signed a second 10-day contract with the Grizzlies on February 26, and then returned to the Hustle again on March 7. He appeared in eight NBA games for the Grizzlies during the 2023–24 season.

On July 29, 2024, Hurt signed with the South East Melbourne Phoenix of the Australian National Basketball League (NBL) for the 2024–25 season. He was named to the All-NBL First Team.

On July 19, 2025, he signed with Trapani Shark of the Lega Basket Serie A (LBA).

== National team career ==
Hurt played for the United States under-18 basketball team at the 2018 FIBA Under-18 Americas Championship. He helped his team win the gold medal.

== Career statistics ==
Legend
GP	Games played	GS	Games started	MPG	Minutes per game
FG%	Field goal percentage	3P%	3-point field goal percentage	FT%	Free throw percentage
RPG	Rebounds per game	APG	Assists per game	SPG	Steals per game
BPG	Blocks per game	PPG	Points per game	**Bold**	Career high

=== NBA ===
Year	Team	GP	GS	MPG	FG%	3P%	FT%	RPG	APG	SPG	BPG	PPG
2023–24	Memphis	8	0	14.2	.353	.250	1.000	2.0	.5	.4	.4	4.0
Career		8	0	14.2	.353	.250	1.000	2.0	.5	.4	.4	4.0

=== College ===
Year	Team	GP	GS	MPG	FG%	3P%	FT%	RPG	APG	SPG	BPG	PPG
2019–20	Duke	**31**	22	20.5	.487	.393	**.741**	3.8	.9	.5	**.7**	9.7
2020–21	Duke	24	**23**	**32.7**	**.556**	**.444**	.724	**6.1**	**1.4**	**.7**	**.7**	**18.3**
Career		55	45	25.8	.526	.421	.731	4.8	1.1	.6	.7	13.5

== Personal life ==
Hurt's older brother Michael played college basketball for Minnesota. His younger sister, Katie, is currently a sophomore playing for the Lehigh Mountain Hawks.
