= Kristian Doolittle =

American basketball player (born 1997)

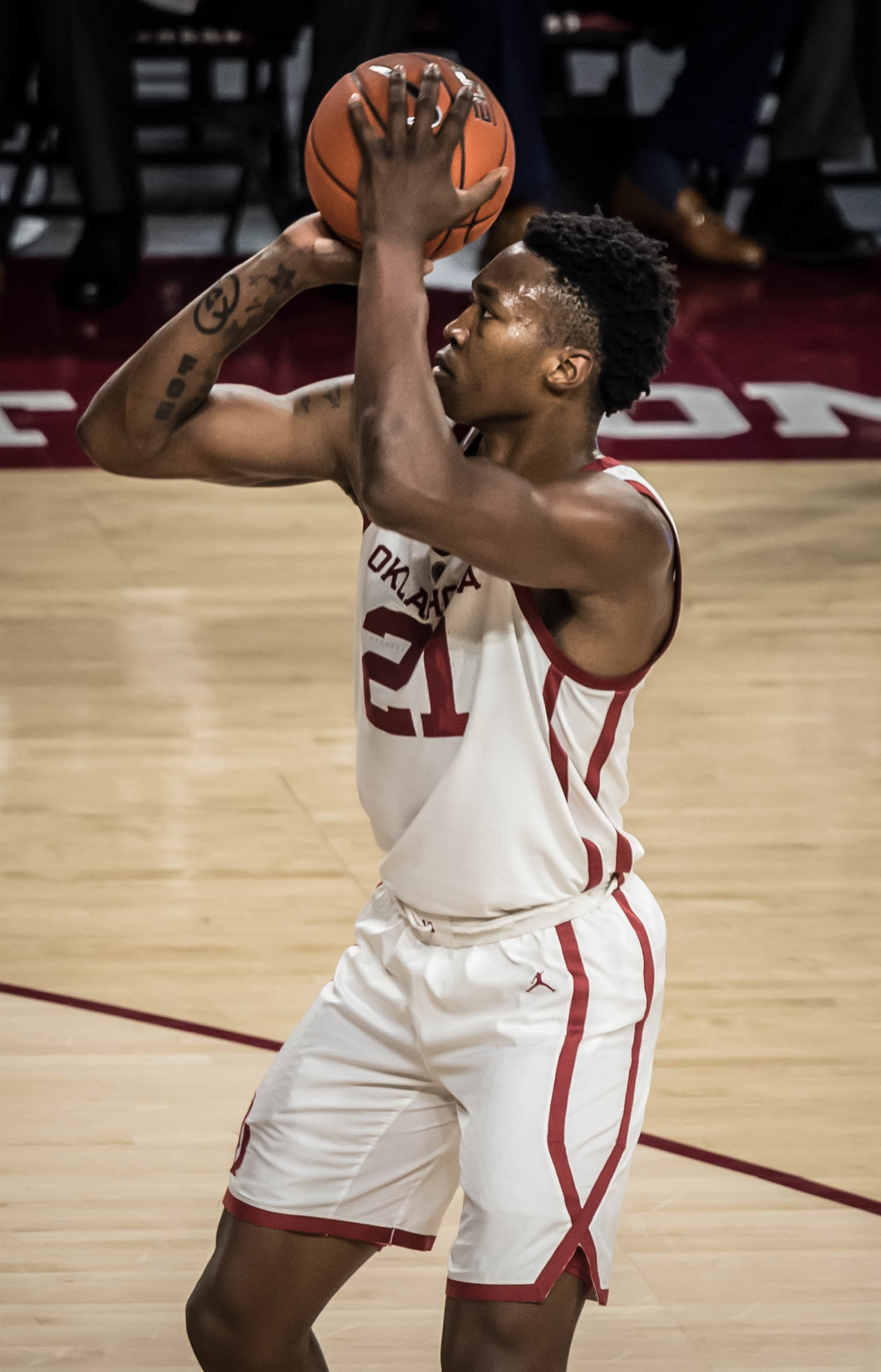
- Doolittle with the Oklahoma Sooners in 2019

No. 5 – Perth Wildcats
- Position: Small forward / power forward
- League: NBL

Personal information
- Born: October 19, 1997 (age 29) Edmond, Oklahoma, U.S.
- Listed height: 6 ft 7 in (2.01 m)
- Listed weight: 232 lb (105 kg)

Career information
- High school: Edmond Memorial (Edmond, Oklahoma)
- College: Oklahoma (2016–2020)
- NBA draft: 2020: undrafted
- Playing career: 2020–present

Career history
- 2020–2024: Vaqueros de Bayamón
- 2021: Canton Charge
- 2021–2022: Hapoel Eilat
- 2022–2023: Iwate Big Bulls
- 2023–present: Perth Wildcats
- 2025–2026: Gigantes de Carolina
- 2026: Osos de Manatí

Career highlights
- All-NBL First Team (2026); B.League D3 champion (2023); 2× BSN champion (2020, 2022); First-team All-Big 12 (2020); Third-team All-Big 12 (2019); Big 12 Most Improved Player (2019)
- Stats at Basketball Reference

Kristian Dontae Doolittle (born October 19, 1997) is an American professional basketball player for the Perth Wildcats of the National Basketball League (NBL). He played college basketball for the Oklahoma Sooners.

== High school career ==
Doolittle played basketball for Edmond Memorial High School in Edmond, Oklahoma. In his freshman season, he played with his future college teammate Jordan Woodard and won the Class 6A state title. As a sophomore, Doolittle averaged 14.6 points and 8.3 rebounds per game. In his junior season, he averaged 17.5 points and a Class 6A-high 12 rebounds per game, earning first-team all-conference, The Oklahoman Super Five and Class 6A all-state honors.

As a senior, Doolittle averaged 24 points, 13 rebounds and five assists per game and led Memorial to the Class 6A state quarterfinals. He was named to the USA Today All-USA Oklahoma first team. Doolittle finished his career as his school's all-time leader in points, rebounds and games played. A four-star recruit and the top player from Oklahoma in the 2016 class, he committed to play college basketball when he was a junior in high school.

== College career ==
As a freshman, Doolittle averaged 9.1 points and 6.2 rebounds per game, making 25 starts. He was suspended for the first semester of his sophomore year due to an academic issue. Doolittle averaged 2.9 points and 4.3 rebounds per game as a sophomore. As a junior, Doolittle was named to the Third Team All-Big 12 and Big 12 Most Improved Player. He averaged 11.3 points and 7.1 rebounds per game. Doolittle was suspended the first game of his senior season by the NCAA due to participating in an unsanctioned summer league game. On November 18, 2019, Doolittle was named Big 12 player of the week after contributing 19 points, a career-high 16 rebounds, and four assists in a win over Oregon State. He earned his second conference player of the week honors on December 23 after posting 21 points and 15 rebounds against Creighton. Doolittle reached the 1,000 point milestone on February 1, 2020, in an 82–69 win over Oklahoma State. On February 17, he earned his third Big 12 player of the week honors after posting 20 points, six rebounds, three steals and three assists in a win against Iowa State followed by 27 points and 12 rebounds against Kansas. At the conclusion of the regular season, Doolittle was named to the First Team All-Big 12. He averaged 15.8 points and 8.9 rebounds per game as a senior, shooting 44.1 percent from the floor, and had 10 double-doubles.

== Professional career ==
=== Puerto Rico (2020–present) ===
In October 2020, Doolittle signed with Vaqueros de Bayamón of the Baloncesto Superior Nacional. He played 16 games for Bayamón between November 13 and December 17, helping them win the championship.

In June 2021, Doolittle returned to Vaqueros de Bayamón. He averaged 12 points, 7 rebounds and 3 assists per game.

Doolittle re-joined Vaqueros de Bayamón in May 2022 and helped the team win another championship.

Doolittle re-joined Vaqueros de Bayamón for the 2023 BSN season.

Doolittle played a fifth straight season with Vaqueros de Bayamón in 2024.

In March 2025, Doolittle joined Gigantes de Carolina for the 2025 BSN season.

In March 2026, Doolittle re-joined Gigantes de Carolina for the 2026 BSN season. He left Gigantes in late April, and in early May, he joined Osos de Manatí to replace Jamil Wilson.

=== Canton Charge (2021) ===
Doolittle played three games for the Canton Charge in the G League hub season between February and March 2021.

=== Hapoel Eilat (2021–2022) ===
On October 16, 2021, Doolittle signed with Hapoel Eilat of the Israeli Basketball Premier League for the 2021–22 season. In 19 games, he averaged 8.5 points, 7.5 rebounds and 2.4 assists per game.

=== Iwate Big Bulls (2022–2023) ===
On June 1, 2022, Doolittle signed with Iwate Big Bulls of the Japanese B.League. He helped the team win the 2022–23 D3 championship.

=== Perth Wildcats (2023–present) ===
Doolittle initially signed with Limoges CSP of the LNB Pro A for the 2023–24 season, but was released prior to the start of the regular season after a disagreement with the coach.

On September 26, 2023, Doolittle signed with the Perth Wildcats in Australia for the 2023–24 NBL season. He averaged nine points, a team-high 6.7 rebounds and 2.1 assists per game while recording four double-doubles.

On March 19, 2024, Doolittle re-signed with the Wildcats for the 2024–25 NBL season. On December 11, 2024, he was ruled out for two to three weeks of action, after sustaining a groin injury in round ten. He returned to action for the Wildcats in mid January 2025. On January 18, 2025, he recorded a career-high 27 points and 10 rebounds in a 110–103 win over the Adelaide 36ers. Four days later, he set a new career high with 33 points in a 99–93 loss to Melbourne United. On March 4, 2025, he had 37 points, 10 rebounds and five assists in a 113–112 loss to United in game three of the semi-finals series. For the season, he averaged 15.4 points, 7.8 rebounds and 3.6 assists per game.

On March 14, 2025, Doolittle re-signed with the Wildcats on a three-year deal. He was named to the All-NBL First Team for the 2025–26 season.

On November 14, 2026, Doolittle scored 29 points in a 111–100 overtime win over the Illawarra Hawks, hitting the game-tying three-pointer with 9.7 seconds remaining in the fourth quarter to force overtime.

== Career statistics ==
Legend
GP	Games played	GS	Games started	MPG	Minutes per game
FG%	Field goal percentage	3P%	3-point field goal percentage	FT%	Free throw percentage
RPG	Rebounds per game	APG	Assists per game	SPG	Steals per game
BPG	Blocks per game	PPG	Points per game	**Bold**	Career high

=== College ===
Year	Team	GP	GS	MPG	FG%	3P%	FT%	RPG	APG	SPG	BPG	PPG
2016–17	Oklahoma	31	25	25.1	.394	.395	**.811**	6.2	1.1	.6	.3	9.1
2017–18	Oklahoma	22	6	17.0	.371	**.500**	.615	4.3	.6	.4	.1	2.9
2018–19	Oklahoma	**34**	**32**	29.1	**.502**	.000	.775	7.1	1.6	.9	**.5**	11.3
2019–20	Oklahoma	29	29	**32.5**	.441	.375	.793	**8.9**	**2.0**	**1.3**	.4	**15.8**
Career		116	92	26.6	.444	.374	.780	6.8	1.4	.8	.4	10.2

== Personal life ==
Doolittle's older brother, Kameron, played college football for Oklahoma State at the wide receiver position. His father, Dwayne, is a longtime football and basketball referee.

Doolittle got married in September 2023. As of November 2023, his wife Mackie was pregnant.
