= Rob Edwards (basketball) =

American basketball player (born 1997)

No. 2 – Pallacanestro Reggiana
- Position: Shooting guard
- League: LBA

Personal information
- Born: January 20, 1997 (age 29) Detroit, Michigan, U.S.
- Listed height: 6 ft 5 in (1.96 m)
- Listed weight: 205 lb (93 kg)

Career information
- High school: Detroit Jesuit (Detroit, Michigan); Cass Tech (Detroit, Michigan)
- College: Cleveland State (2015–2017); Arizona State (2018–2020)
- NBA draft: 2020: undrafted
- Playing career: 2021–present

Career history
- 2021–2022: Oklahoma City Blue
- 2021–2022: Oklahoma City Thunder
- 2022–2023: Wisconsin Herd
- 2023: BG Göttingen
- 2023: Cleveland Charge
- 2023–2024: Maine Celtics
- 2024: Delaware Blue Coats
- 2024–2025: Cairns Taipans
- 2025: Xinjiang Flying Tigers
- 2025: Osos de Manatí
- 2025: Jiangsu Dragons
- 2026: Hangzhou Jingwei
- 2026: Ironi Kiryat Ata
- 2026–present: Reggiana

Career highlights
- Second-team All-Horizon League (2017); Horizon League All-Freshman Team (2016)
- Stats at NBA.com
- Stats at Basketball Reference

Robert Martin Edwards IV (born January 20, 1997) is an American professional basketball player for Reggio Emilia of the Italian Lega Basket Serie A (LBA). He played college basketball for the Cleveland State Vikings and Arizona State Sun Devils before beginning his professional career with the Oklahoma City Blue in 2021. During the 2021–22 season, Edwards was called up to the Oklahoma City Thunder of the National Basketball Association (NBA).

== Early life ==
Edwards was born and raised in Detroit, Michigan. He attended the University of Detroit Jesuit High School and Academy for the first two years of high school before transferring to Cass Technical High School. He helped Cass Tech to a Class A District title as a junior, scoring 19 points in the district championship game. He earned honorable mention all-state honors as a senior in 2014–15, averaging 16 points, six rebounds, six assists and three steals per game.

== College career ==
Edwards played his first two years of college basketball for the Cleveland State Vikings. He was named to the Horizon League All-Freshman Team in 2016 and second-team All-Horizon League in 2017. Edwards averaged 16.5 points and 4.5 rebounds per game as a sophomore. He transferred to Arizona State following the season and sat out the 2017–18 season due to NCAA transfer regulations. As a redshirt junior, Edwards averaged 11.1 points and 3.3 rebounds per game. He averaged 11.6 points and 3.6 rebounds per game as a senior and scored a season-high 24 points twice.

== Professional career ==
=== Oklahoma City Thunder / Blue (2021–2022) ===
Edwards went undrafted in the 2020 NBA draft. In January 2021, he joined the Oklahoma City Blue of the NBA G League after being selected in the G League draft. He played for the Blue in the G League hub season between February and March 2021. In 15 games, he made three starts and averaged 12.5 points, 3.4 rebounds and 1.5 assists in 21.3 minutes per game on 44.0 percent shooting from beyond the arc.

In August 2021, Edwards played for the Oklahoma City Thunder in the NBA Summer League. He signed with the Thunder on September 27, and was then waived on October 11 after appearing in one preseason game. He re-joined the Blue for the 2021–22 NBA G League season. On December 27, 2021, he signed a 10-day contract with the Thunder. He re-joined the Blue on January 6 after appearing in two NBA games.

=== Wisconsin Herd (2022–2023) ===
On September 2, 2022, Edwards' returning rights were acquired by the Wisconsin Herd in a trade with the Blue. On September 16, he signed with the Milwaukee Bucks, but was waived on the same day. On November 3, 2022, Edwards was named to the opening-night roster for the Herd. He averaged 15.1 points, 3.8 rebounds and 2.2 assists per game during the 2022–23 NBA G League season.

=== BG Göttingen (2023) ===
On March 28, 2023, Edwards signed with BG Göttingen of the Basketball Bundesliga.

=== Cleveland Charge (2023) ===
On October 21, 2023, Edwards was signed and immediately waived by the Cleveland Cavaliers. He subsequently joined the Cleveland Charge of the NBA G League for the 2023–24 season. In 16 Showcase Cup games, he averaged 9.9 points in 16 games.

=== Maine Celtics (2023–2024) ===
On December 26, 2023, Edwards was traded to the Maine Celtics. He was waived on February 24, 2024, after averaging 6.5 points in 16 games.

=== Delaware Blue Coats (2024) ===
On March 4, 2024, Edwards joined the Delaware Blue Coats.

=== Cairns Taipans (2024–2025) ===
On May 24, 2024, Edwards signed with the Cairns Taipans of the Australian National Basketball League (NBL) for the 2024–25 season. On November 6, he received a one match suspension for his actions and comments towards referees after a game against Melbourne United on October 27. On February 2, 2025, he was granted an early release from his contract to allow him to depart for his next destination. He averaged 19.8 points, 4.1 rebounds and 2.3 assists per game.

=== Xinjiang Flying Tigers (2025) ===
On February 4, 2025, Edwards joined the Xinjiang Flying Tigers of the Chinese Basketball Association (CBA) for the rest of the 2024–25 season. In five games, he averaged 7.6 points, 4.6 rebounds and 1.6 assists per game.

=== Osos de Manatí (2025) ===
Edwards played six games for Osos de Manatí of the Baloncesto Superior Nacional during the 2025 season, averaging 10.8 points, 2.8 rebounds and 1.0 assists per game.

=== Jiangsu Dragons (2025) ===
In December 2025, Edwards joined the Jiangsu Dragons of the Chinese Basketball Association. He appeared in six games between December 13 and December 30.

=== Hangzhou Jingwei (2026) ===
In January 2026, Edwards joined Hangzhou Jingwei of the Chinese National Basketball League. In 20 games, he averaged 15.2 points, 4.5 rebounds, 3.0 assists and 1.2 steals per game.

=== Ironi Kiryat Ata (2026) ===
In May 2026, Edwards joined Ironi Kiryat Ata of the Israeli Basketball Premier League. In six games to finish the 2025–26 season, he averaged 21.8 points, 4.2 rebounds, 4.2 assists and 1.7 steals per game.

=== Pallacanestro Reggiana (2026–present) ===
On July 16, 2026, Edwards signed with Reggio Emilia of the Italian Lega Basket Serie A (LBA).

== Personal life ==
Edwards has one brother and one sister. His cousin, Kalin Lucas, played basketball at Michigan State and played in the NBA in 2014 and 2019.

Edwards has a daughter who was born in 2024.

== Career statistics ==
Legend
GP	Games played	GS	Games started	MPG	Minutes per game
FG%	Field goal percentage	3P%	3-point field goal percentage	FT%	Free throw percentage
RPG	Rebounds per game	APG	Assists per game	SPG	Steals per game
BPG	Blocks per game	PPG	Points per game	**Bold**	Career high

=== NBA ===
Year	Team	GP	GS	MPG	FG%	3P%	FT%	RPG	APG	SPG	BPG	PPG
2021–22	Oklahoma City	2	0	5.5	.250	.250	—	1.5	.0	.0	.0	1.5
Career		2	0	5.5	.250	.250	—	1.5	.0	.0	.0	1.5
