= Dylan Windler =

American basketball player (born 1996)

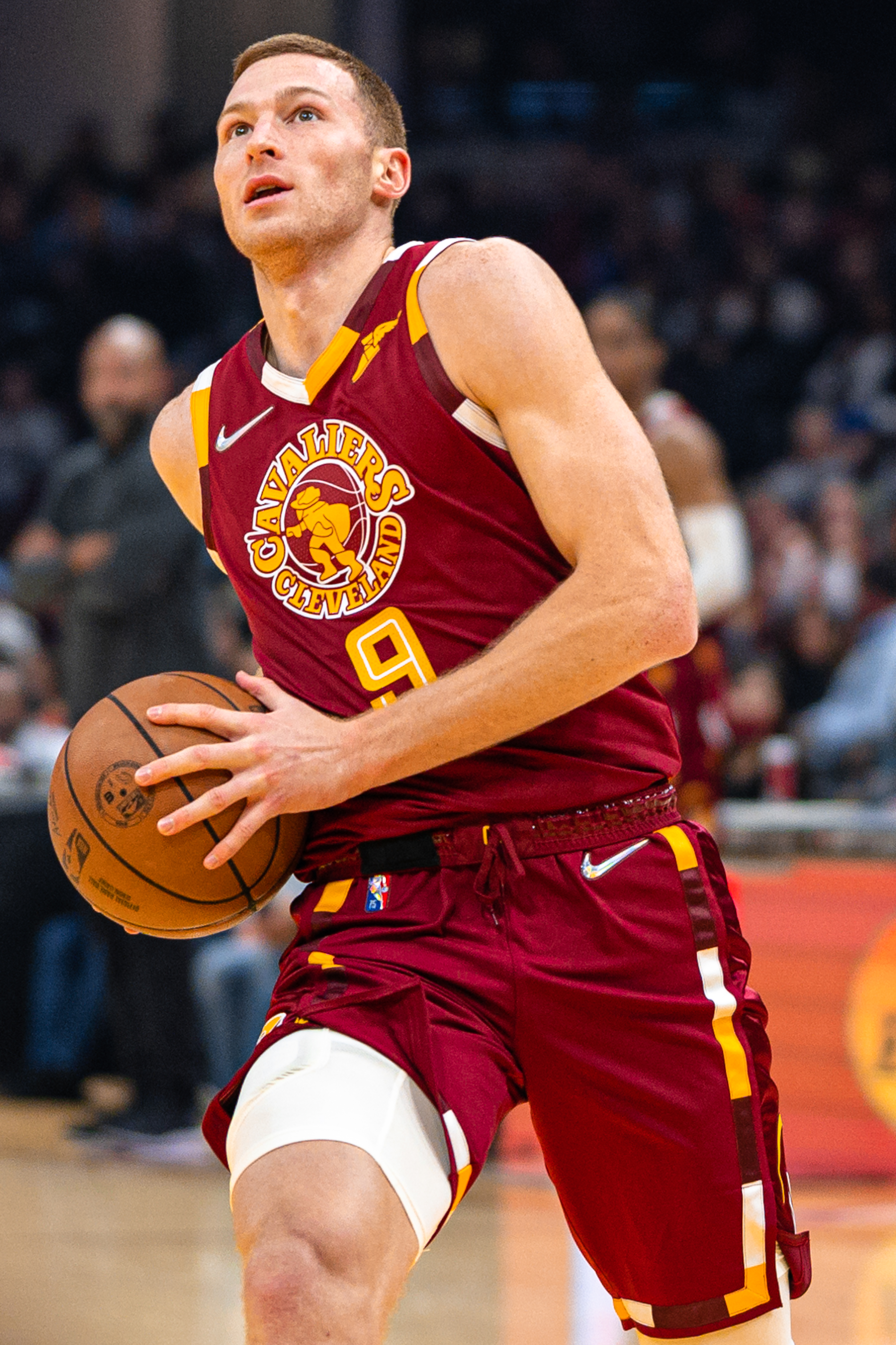
- Windler with the Cleveland Cavaliers in 2021

No. 3 – Perth Wildcats
- Position: Small forward / shooting guard
- League: NBL

Personal information
- Born: September 22, 1996 (age 30) Indianapolis, Indiana, U.S.
- Listed height: 6 ft 7 in (2.01 m)
- Listed weight: 196 lb (89 kg)

Career information
- High school: Perry Meridian (Indianapolis, Indiana)
- College: Belmont (2015–2019)
- NBA draft: 2019: 1st round, 26th overall pick
- Drafted by: Cleveland Cavaliers
- Playing career: 2019–present

Career history
- 2019–2023: Cleveland Cavaliers
- 2019; 2021–2023: →Canton / Cleveland Charge
- 2023: New York Knicks
- 2023: →Westchester Knicks
- 2023–2024: Westchester Knicks
- 2024: Los Angeles Lakers
- 2024: →South Bay Lakers
- 2024: Atlanta Hawks
- 2024–present: Perth Wildcats

Career highlights
- 2× First-team All-OVC (2018, 2019)
- Stats at NBA.com
- Stats at Basketball Reference

Dylan Windler (born September 22, 1996) is an American professional basketball player for the Perth Wildcats of the National Basketball League (NBL). He played college basketball for the Belmont Bruins.

== High school career ==
Dylan grew up in Indianapolis, Indiana, where he attended Perry Meridian High School. In addition to basketball, Windler excelled at golf and participated in various junior golf tournaments. In the summer of 2014, Windler was selected to play for the Indiana Elite AAU team alongside future Virginia player Kyle Guy. His performance attracted scholarship offers from 15 Division I schools, and he eventually signed with Belmont. Windler led the state in points and rebounds per game as a senior with 27.3 points and 10.2 rebounds per contest.

== College career ==
Windler played at Belmont University in Nashville, Tennessee. As a freshman, Windler played a reserve role, averaging around 4.3 points per game. His following sophomore year, he took on a starting guard position and became an outside threat with a 39.8% three-point completion rate, averaging 9.2 points per game. Windler's junior year was a breakout season with 17.3 points per game, 9.3 rebounds per game, and shooting over 45% from three. He had a career-high 36-point, 20-rebound game against Morehead State on February 17, 2018. He was named to the First-Team All-OVC. Coming into his senior season, Windler was named to the 2019 Julius Erving Award Watch List. Windler broke his career-high in points with 41, including a career-high eight 3-pointers, along with 10 rebounds and three steals in a 96–86 win against Morehead State on February 10, 2019. As a senior, he scored 21.3 points per game and collected 10.8 rebounds per game, helping Belmont qualify for the NCAA tournament as an at-large. In a win over Temple, Windler had five points, 14 rebounds, and two assists and three steals. The Belmont Bruins faced off against the Maryland Terrapins in the NCAA Tournament Round of 64. Despite 35 points and 11 rebounds from Windler, Belmont narrowly lost 79–77.

== Professional career ==
=== Cleveland Cavaliers (2019–2023) ===
Windler was drafted 26th overall by the Cleveland Cavaliers in the 2019 NBA draft. On July 3, 2019, he signed his rookie scale contract with the Cavaliers. He played for the Cavaliers in the 2019 NBA Summer League. He was diagnosed at the start of the 2019–20 season with left lower leg stress reaction. He was assigned to the Canton Charge of the NBA G League on December 4 and then recalled on December 8. On January 13, 2020, he was ruled out for the season due to ongoing symptoms with the leg injury. He had surgery on January 21. He played two games for the Charge but did not make his NBA debut with Cavaliers.

Windler returned to the Cavaliers for the 2020–21 season. He made his NBA debut on December 23, 2020, recording three points and two steals in a 121–114 win over the Charlotte Hornets. On February 23, 2021, he scored a career-high 15 points in a 112–111 win over the Atlanta Hawks.

During the 2021–22 season, Windler was assigned six times to the Cleveland Charge of the NBA G League. He also received six assignments to the Charge late in the 2022–23 season.

=== New York / Westchester Knicks (2023–2024) ===
On July 26, 2023, Windler signed a two-way contract with the New York Knicks. The contract was later converted into a standard contract prior to the start of the regular season. He was assigned several times to the Westchester Knicks in November and December before being waived by New York on December 13. He was acquired by Westchester as a regular player two days later. On January 5, 2024, he recorded 23 points and 33 rebounds in a 128–121 win over the Delaware Blue Coats, breaking the all-time NBA G League record for most rebounds in a game.

=== Los Angeles / South Bay Lakers (2024) ===
On January 6, 2024, Windler signed a two-way contract with the Los Angeles Lakers. He played eight games for Los Angeles in the NBA and three games for the South Bay Lakers in the G League. On March 2, he was waived by the Lakers.

=== Atlanta Hawks (2024) ===
On March 4, 2024, Windler signed a two-way contract with the Atlanta Hawks. He played six games for the Hawks to finish the 2023–24 season and then joined the Hawks in the 2024 NBA Summer League.

=== Perth Wildcats (2024–present) ===
On August 23, 2024, Windler signed with the Perth Wildcats of the Australian National Basketball League (NBL) for the 2024–25 season. In game two of the Wildcats' semi-finals series against Melbourne United, Windler recorded 27 points, 11 rebounds, four assists and four blocks along with six 3-pointers in a 96–89 series-tying win. Windler was the Wildcats' second-leading rebounder with 6.6 per game, while he also averaged 12.2 points, 1.5 steals and 1.1 blocks while shooting at 40 per cent from long-range on over five attempts per game.

On April 17, 2025, Windler re-signed with the Wildcats on a two-year deal. On September 27, 2025, he recorded 20 points and 15 rebounds in an 89–78 win over the New Zealand Breakers. In late January 2026, Windler suffered a torn plantar fascia. He played through the injury but his game time reduced drastically across the last two games of the regular season, spending only 18 minutes on court against the Adelaide 36ers and failing to score.

On October 10, 2026, Windler scored 32 points with seven 3-pointers in a 100–84 win over the New Zealand Breakers. On November 14, he recorded 22 points, 11 rebounds and four steals in a 111–100 overtime win over the Illawarra Hawks.

== Career statistics ==
Legend
GP	Games played	GS	Games started	MPG	Minutes per game
FG%	Field goal percentage	3P%	3-point field goal percentage	FT%	Free throw percentage
RPG	Rebounds per game	APG	Assists per game	SPG	Steals per game
BPG	Blocks per game	PPG	Points per game	**Bold**	Career high

=== NBA ===
Year	Team	GP	GS	MPG	FG%	3P%	FT%	RPG	APG	SPG	BPG	PPG
2020–21	Cleveland	31	**0**	**16.5**	.438	.338	.778	**3.5**	**1.1**	**.6**	**.4**	**5.2**
2021–22	Cleveland	**50**	**0**	9.2	.378	.300	**.833**	1.8	.7	.3	.1	2.2
2022–23	Cleveland	3	**0**	3.5	**.667**	**.500**	—	.0	.3	.3	.0	1.7
2023–24	New York	3	**0**	2.5	.500	**.500**	—	.3	.3	.0	.0	1.0
2023–24	L.A. Lakers	8	**0**	3.5	.444	**.500**	—	.4	.8	.0	.0	1.5
2023–24	Atlanta	6	**0**	12.2	.526	.471	—	2.0	.5	.3	.0	4.7
Career		101	0	10.8	.425	.347	.800	2.1	.8	.4	.1	3.2

=== College ===
Year	Team	GP	GS	MPG	FG%	3P%	FT%	RPG	APG	SPG	BPG	PPG
2015–16	Belmont	32	1	18.4	.495	.239	.667	4.5	.9	.6	.6	4.3
2016–17	Belmont	30	30	30.1	.533	.398	.733	6.3	1.6	.9	**1.0**	9.2
2017–18	Belmont	**33**	**33**	**35.4**	**.559**	.426	.718	9.3	**2.7**	1.0	.9	17.3
2018–19	Belmont	**33**	**33**	33.2	.540	**.429**	**.847**	**10.8**	2.5	**1.4**	.6	**21.3**
Career		128	97	29.4	.541	.406	.761	7.8	2.0	1.0	.8	13.2

== Personal life ==
Winder's wife Lauren gave birth to the couple's first child in December 2024 in Perth, Australia.
