= Pedro Bradshaw =

American basketball player (born 1998)

No. 32 – Grand Rapids Gold
- Position: Small forward / shooting guard
- League: NBA G League

Personal information
- Born: October 14, 1998 (age 28) Russellville, Kentucky, U.S.
- Listed height: 6 ft 5 in (1.96 m)
- Listed weight: 190 lb (86 kg)

Career information
- High school: Russellville (Russellville, Kentucky)
- College: Eastern Kentucky (2018–2019); Bellarmine (2019–2021)
- NBA draft: 2021: undrafted
- Playing career: 2021–present

Career history
- 2021: Salt Lake City Stars
- 2021–2022: Sioux Falls Skyforce
- 2022: Iowa Wolves
- 2022–2024: Fort Wayne / Indiana Mad Ants
- 2024–2025: Cairns Taipans
- 2025: Rostock Seawolves
- 2025: Salt Lake City Stars
- 2026: Maine Celtics
- 2026–present: Grand Rapids Gold

Career highlights
- NBA G League Winter Showcase Champion (2025); First-team All-ASUN (2021)
- Stats at Basketball Reference

DeAndre Cortez "Pedro" Bradshaw (born October 14, 1998) is an American professional basketball player for the Grand Rapids Gold of the NBA G League. He played college basketball for the Eastern Kentucky Colonels and the Bellarmine Knights.

== Early life ==
Bradshaw attended Russellville High School in Russellville, Kentucky. He averaged 21.1 points and 12.2 rebounds per game as a junior. As a senior, he averaged 22.1 points and 13.1 rebounds per game, leading the team to the Region 4 Tournament championship game. Bradshaw earned co-Region 4 Player of the Year honors. He was a finalist for Kentucky Mr. Basketball and finished his career with 1,938 points and 1,169 rebounds, both school records. Bradshaw committed to playing college basketball for Belmont, choosing the Bruins over Eastern Kentucky, Long Beach State and UNC Wilmington.

== College career ==
Bradshaw was urged to take a redshirt year by Belmont coach Rick Byrd, but he declined. Bradshaw opted to transfer to Eastern Kentucky in December 2017, after not seeing playing time in nine games. He sat out a season and was eligible at the semester break in 2018. Bradshaw averaged 2.4 points and 1.8 rebounds per game as a sophomore at Eastern Kentucky, and entered the transfer portal after the season. He ended up coming to Division II program Bellarmine and had immediate eligibility. Bradshaw averaged 9.2 points per game, helping the Knights finish 20–8. As a senior, he averaged 16 points per game and 6.9 rebounds per game as Bellarmine transitioned to Division I. Bradshaw was named to the First Team All-ASUN. Following the season, he declared for the 2021 NBA draft.

== Professional career ==
=== Salt Lake City Stars (2021) ===
Bradshaw was selected with the 10th pick of the second round of the 2021 NBA G League draft by the Salt Lake City Stars. On November 7, 2021, he scored 23 points against the Oklahoma City Blue. He was waived by the Stars on December 4, 2021. He averaged 8.3 points, 2.8 rebounds and 1.3 assists per game.

=== Sioux Falls Skyforce (2021–2022) ===
On December 6, Bradshaw was acquired by the Sioux Falls Skyforce. He was later waived on January 14, 2022.

=== Iowa Wolves (2022) ===
On January 16, 2022, Bradshaw was acquired by the Iowa Wolves. He was waived on January 31, after appearing in three games and averaging 1.7 points and 3.5 rebounds. Bradshaw was re-acquired on February 14, but waived again on February 19.

=== Fort Wayne / Indiana Mad Ants (2022–2024) ===
On February 21, 2022, Bradshaw was acquired by the Fort Wayne Mad Ants.

In October 2022, Bradshaw re-joined the Fort Wayne Mad Ants for the 2022–23 NBA G League season.

On September 26, 2023, Bradshaw signed with the Indiana Pacers, but was waived two days later. He subsequently returned to the Mad Ants, now known as the Indiana Mad Ants, for the 2023–24 NBA G League season.

Bradshaw played for the Charlotte Hornets in the 2024 NBA Summer League.

=== Cairns Taipans (2024–2025) ===
On July 29, 2024, Bradshaw signed with the Cairns Taipans of the Australian National Basketball League (NBL) for the 2024–25 season. On October 30, 2024, he was ruled out for eight weeks due to a right ankle rupture that he suffered in round six. He returned to action in early December.

=== Rostock Seawolves (2025) ===
On February 24, 2025, he signed with Rostock Seawolves of the Basketball Bundesliga (BBL).

=== Grand Rapids Gold (2026–present) ===
On September 30, 2026, Bradshaw was acquired by the Grand Rapids Gold.

== Career statistics ==
Legend
GP	Games played	GS	Games started	MPG	Minutes per game
FG%	Field goal percentage	3P%	3-point field goal percentage	FT%	Free throw percentage
RPG	Rebounds per game	APG	Assists per game	SPG	Steals per game
BPG	Blocks per game	PPG	Points per game	**Bold**	Career high

=== College ===
==== NCAA Division I ====
Year	Team	GP	GS	MPG	FG%	3P%	FT%	RPG	APG	SPG	BPG	PPG
2017–18	Belmont	Redshirt										
2018–19	Eastern Kentucky	10	1	7.3	.417	.167	.600	1.8	.4	.6	.2	2.4
2020–21	Bellarmine	**22**	**22**	**29.4**	**.500**	**.360**	**.835**	**6.9**	**2.5**	**1.6**	**.5**	**16.0**
Career		32	23	22.5	.492	.339	.825	5.3	1.8	1.3	.4	11.7

==== NCAA Division II ====
Year	Team	GP	GS	MPG	FG%	3P%	FT%	RPG	APG	SPG	BPG	PPG
2019–20	Bellarmine	28	24	22.6	.545	.421	.800	5.3	1.9	1.0	.5	9.2

== Personal life ==
Bradshaw received his nickname, "Pedro", from his grandfather who remarked that he looked "like a Pedro" when he was a baby.
