= Keandre Cook =

American basketball player (born 1997)

- Cook with Petkim Spor in 2026

No. 1 – Petkim Spor
- Position: Shooting guard
- League: BSL

Personal information
- Born: May 1, 1997 (age 29) Baltimore, Maryland, U.S.
- Listed height: 6 ft 5 in (1.96 m)
- Listed weight: 187 lb (85 kg)

Career information
- High school: Northwestern (Baltimore, Maryland); Edmondson-Westside (Baltimore, Maryland)
- College: Odessa (2016–2018); Missouri State (2018–2020)
- NBA draft: 2020: undrafted
- Playing career: 2021–present

Career history
- 2021: Greensboro Swarm
- 2021–2022: Szedeák
- 2022–2023: ADA Blois
- 2023: MZT Skopje
- 2023–2024: Crailsheim Merlins
- 2024–2025: Brisbane Bullets
- 2025: Guangdong Southern Tigers
- 2025: Ironi Kiryat Ata
- 2025–2026: Río Breogán
- 2026: Hapoel Tel Aviv
- 2026–present: Petkim Spor

Career highlights
- Macedonian League champion (2023); Macedonian Cup winner (2023); Second-team All-MVC (2020); Third-team All-MVC (2019); MVC All-Newcomer Team (2019); First-team All-WJCAC (2018)
- Stats at NBA.com
- Stats at Basketball Reference

Keandre Gary Cook (born May 1, 1997) is an American professional basketball player for Petkim Spor of the Basketbol Süper Ligi (BSL). He played college basketball at Odessa College and Missouri State.

== High school career ==
Cook attended Northwestern High School in Baltimore, Maryland for three years, joining the junior varsity basketball team as a freshman. He joined the varsity team as a sophomore and averaged 21 points per game as a junior. Prior to his senior season, Cook transferred to Edmondson-Westside High School. He averaged 19 points per game, helping the team finish 28–3. Cook committed to Odessa College over Midland College and Panola College, among other junior colleges.

== College career ==
As a freshman at Odessa College, Cook averaged 4.7 points and 1.8 rebounds per game off the bench. He averaged 15 points and 5.4 rebounds per game as a sophomore. Cook was ranked the No. 76 player in his class by JucoRecruiting.com. He transferred to Missouri State over offers from Louisiana Tech and New Mexico State. He scored at least 20 points in four of his first five games for the Bears. Cook was named Missouri Valley Conference player of the week on January 28, 2019, and twice earned newcomer of the week honors. As a junior, he averaged 12.8 points and 4.3 rebounds per game. Cook was named to the Third Team All-Missouri Valley Conference as well as the All-Newcomer Team. Coming into his senior season, Cook was named to the preseason second team all-conference and established himself as a leader on the team. On November 10, 2019, he scored a career-high 31 points shooting 6-of-7 from three-point range in a 59–50 win over Alabama State. Cook was issued a technical foul for flopping with under a minute remaining in a game against Xavier on November 16, resulting in a loss for Missouri State. He averaged 14.9 points and 4.6 rebounds per game as a senior, earning Second Team All-Missouri Valley Conference honors.

== Professional career ==
After going undrafted in the 2020 NBA draft, Cook signed with the Charlotte Hornets. He was waived at the end of training camp, but added to the roster of their NBA G League affiliate, the Greensboro Swarm. Cook averaged 1.6 points and 1.6 rebounds in eight games during the G League hub season between February and March 2021.

On June 25, 2021, Cook signed with Szedeák of the Hungarian Nemzeti Bajnokság I/A.

On July 13, 2022, Cook signed with ADA Blois Basket 41 of the LNB Pro A. In January 2023, he left France and joined MZT Skopje in North Macedonia.

For the 2023–24 season, Cook joined Crailsheim Merlins of the German Basketball Bundesliga.

On May 21, 2024, Cook signed with the Brisbane Bullets of the Australian National Basketball League (NBL) for the 2024–25 season. On March 2, 2025, he signed with the Guangdong Southern Tigers of the Chinese Basketball Association (CBA) for the rest of the 2024–25 season.

On April 8, 2025, he signed with Ironi Kiryat Ata of the Israeli Basketball Premier League.

On June 14, 2025, Cook signed with Río Breogán of the Liga ACB.

On May 22, 2026, Cook signed with Hapoel Tel Aviv of the Israeli Premier League.

On July 12, 2026, he signed with Petkim Spor of the Basketbol Süper Ligi (BSL).
