= 2024–25 NBL season =

47th season of the Australasian basketball competition

- League: National Basketball League
- Season: 2024–25
- Duration: 19 September 2024 – 8 February 2025; 11–16 February 2025 (Play-in tournament); 26 February – 6 March 2025 (Semifinals); 9–23 March 2025 (Finals)
- Matches played: 145
- Teams: 10
- TV partners: Australia: ESPN; Network 10; 10 Bold; New Zealand: ESPN; TVNZ; Online: Kayo Sports; NBL TV; 10Play; TVNZ+

Regular season
- Season champions: Illawarra Hawks
- Season MVP: (United States) Bryce Cotton (Perth)

Finals
- Champions: Illawarra Hawks (2nd title)
- Runners-up: Melbourne United
- Semi-finalists: Perth Wildcats; S.E. Melbourne Phoenix
- Finals MVP: (Australia) Matthew Dellavedova (Melbourne)

Statistical leaders
| Points | (United States) Bryce Cotton (Perth) | 28.6 |
| Rebounds | (New Zealand) Tyrell Harrison (Brisbane) | 9.7 |
| Assists | (United States) Kendric Davis (Adelaide) | 8.0 |
| Efficiency | (Senegal) Tacko Fall (New Zealand) | 73% |

Records
- Biggest home win: 43 points Melbourne 106–63 Cairns (27 October 2024)
- Biggest away win: 36 points Cairns 92–128 Perth (14 December 2024)
- Highest scoring: 241 points Perth 116–125 Cairns (25 January 2025)
- Lowest scoring: 142 points Cairns 66–76 Melbourne (26 December 2024)
- Winning streak: 8 games Tasmania JackJumpers (9 November 2024 – 29 December)
- Losing streak: 15 games Cairns Taipans (10 October 2024 – 31 December)
- Highest attendance: 16,705 – Sydney SuperDome; Sydney vs Tasmania (19 January 2025)
- Lowest attendance: 2,110 – TSB Stadium; New Zealand vs Melbourne (13 January 2025)
- Attendance: 1,024,176 (7,063 per match)

NBL seasons
- ← 2023–24 2025–26 →
- All statistics correct as of 8 February 2025.

The 2024–25 NBL season was the 47th season of the National Basketball League since its establishment in 1979. A total of ten teams contested in the 2024–25 season.

The league extended its partnership with ESPN Australia. All games are available live on ESPN, Kayo Sports and Fetch TV. Network 10 broadcasts the marquee 2:30pm Sunday game on Network 10’s main channel followed by the second game at 4:30pm on 10 Bold and 10Play. In New Zealand, ESPN New Zealand will be the official league broadcaster.

As Australia and New Zealand participated in 2025 FIBA Asia Cup qualification, the league took a break during the FIBA international windows of 18–27 November 2024 and 17–25 February 2025.

The Illawarra Hawks won their second championship, ending a 24-year title drought, after defeating Melbourne United in the Championship Series.

== Teams ==
All ten teams from the 2023–24 NBL season continued on in 2024–25.

=== Stadiums and locations ===
| Team | Location | Stadium | Capacity |
|---|---|---|---|
| Adelaide 36ers | Adelaide | Adelaide Entertainment Centre | 11,300 |
| Brisbane Bullets | Brisbane | Brisbane Entertainment Centre | 10,500 |
| Cairns Taipans | Cairns | Cairns Convention Centre | 5,300 |
| Illawarra Hawks | Wollongong | Wollongong Entertainment Centre | 6,000 |
| Melbourne United | Melbourne | John Cain Arena | 10,175 |
| New Zealand Breakers | Auckland | Spark Arena | 9,740 |
| Perth Wildcats | Perth | Perth Arena | 14,800 |
| S.E. Melbourne Phoenix | Melbourne | John Cain Arena | 10,175 |
| S.E. Melbourne Phoenix | Melbourne | State Basketball Centre | 3,422 |
| Sydney Kings | Sydney | Sydney SuperDome | 18,200 |
| Tasmania JackJumpers | Hobart | Derwent Entertainment Centre | 4,340 |
| Tasmania JackJumpers | Launceston | Silverdome | 3,255 |

=== Personnel and sponsorship ===
| Team | Coach | Captain | Main sponsor | Kit manufacturer |
|---|---|---|---|---|
| Adelaide 36ers | (United States) Mike Wells | (Australia) Dejan Vasiljevic | Walker Corporation | Champion |
| Brisbane Bullets | (Australia) Justin Schueller | (Australia) Mitch Norton | Carnival Cruise Line | Champion |
| Cairns Taipans | (Australia) Adam Forde | (Australia) Taran Armstrong | Kenfrost Homes | Champion |
| Illawarra Hawks | (United States) Justin Tatum | (Australia) Sam Froling (United States) Tyler Harvey | Greater Bank | Champion |
| Melbourne United | (Australia) Dean Vickerman | (Australia) Chris Goulding | Engie | Champion |
| New Zealand Breakers | (Finland) Petteri Koponen | (United States) Parker Jackson-Cartwright (Australia) Mitch McCarron | Bank of New Zealand | Champion |
| Perth Wildcats | (Australia) John Rillie | (Australia) Jesse Wagstaff | Mate Internet Mobile | Champion |
| S.E. Melbourne Phoenix | (United States) Josh King | (Australia) Jordan Hunter (Australia) Nathan Sobey | Mountain Goat Beer | Champion |
| Sydney Kings | (Australia) Brian Goorjian | (Australia) Shaun Bruce (Australia) Xavier Cooks | Harvey Norman | Champion |
| Tasmania JackJumpers | (United States) Scott Roth | (Australia) Clint Steindl | Spirit of Tasmania | Champion |

=== Player transactions ===
Free agency began on 15 April 2024.

=== Coaching transactions ===
Head coaching transactions
| Team | 2023–24 season | 2024–25 season | |
Off-season
| Adelaide 36ers | Scott Ninnis | Mike Wells | |
| New Zealand Breakers | Mody Maor | Petteri Koponen | |
| Perth Wildcats | John Rillie | | |
| Sydney Kings | Mahmoud Abdelfattah | Brian Goorjian | |
In-season
| S.E. Melbourne Phoenix | Mike Kelly | Sam Mackinnon (interim) | Josh King |

== Pre-season ==
The pre-season games will begin on 17 August to 10 October 2024.

The pre-season also featured the New Zealand Breakers to play games between NBA teams, this will be the sixth NBLxNBA tour.

=== NBL Blitz ===
The 2024 NBL Blitz will run from 7 to 14 September with games being played at the Carrara Indoor Stadium and the Gold Coast Sports Centre. Gold Coast, Queensland will host the tournament for a second consecutive year.

| Pos | Team | Pld | W | L | PF | PA | PP | BP | Pts |
|---|---|---|---|---|---|---|---|---|---|
| 1 | Brisbane Bullets (C) | 3 | 3 | 0 | 285 | 262 | 108.8 | 6.5 | 15.5 |
| 2 | Perth Wildcats | 3 | 3 | 0 | 295 | 271 | 108.9 | 5 | 14 |
| 3 | Sydney Kings | 3 | 2 | 1 | 290 | 269 | 107.8 | 8 | 14 |
| 4 | S.E. Melbourne Phoenix | 3 | 2 | 1 | 307 | 262 | 117.2 | 7.5 | 13.5 |
| 5 | Melbourne United | 3 | 2 | 1 | 304 | 298 | 102.0 | 7 | 13 |
| 6 | Adelaide 36ers | 3 | 2 | 1 | 243 | 256 | 94.9 | 5 | 11 |
| 7 | Illawarra Hawks | 3 | 1 | 2 | 305 | 297 | 102.7 | 7.5 | 10.5 |
| 8 | New Zealand Breakers | 3 | 0 | 3 | 272 | 296 | 91.9 | 6.5 | 6.5 |
| 9 | Cairns Taipans | 4 | 0 | 4 | 322 | 367 | 87.7 | 4 | 4 |
| 10 | Tasmania JackJumpers | 2 | 0 | 2 | 140 | 185 | 75.7 | 3 | 3 |

Updated to match(es) played on 14 September 2024. Source: nblblitz.com.au
(C) Champions

== Regular season ==
The regular season will begin on 19 September 2024. It will consist of 145 games (29 games each) spread across 20 rounds, with the final game being played on 8 February 2025.

=== Round 1 ===
| 19 September 2024 | Melbourne United | 88–79 | Tasmania JackJumpers | Perth Arena, Perth |
| 18:30 | Scoring by quarter: 23–20, 22–23, 27–16, 16–20 |
| ESPN | Pts: Dellavedova 21; Rebs: Loe 8 Asts: Dellavedova 6 | boxscore report | Pts: Doyle 23; Rebs: Te Rangi 8 Asts: Magnay 5 | Attendance: 4,666 |

| 20 September 2024 | Perth Wildcats | 106–98 | S.E. Melbourne Phoenix | Perth Arena, Perth |
| 18:30 | Scoring by quarter: 29–17, 24–27, 27–21, 26–33 |
| ESPN | Pts: Pinder 29; Rebs: Doolittle 13; Asts: Henshall 7 | boxscore report | Pts: Hunter 19; Rebs: Hurt 12; Asts: Walton 8 | Attendance: 11,530 |

| 21 September 2024 | New Zealand Breakers | 91–87 | Brisbane Bullets | Perth HPC, Perth |
| 16:00 | Scoring by quarter: 24–19, 27–15, 21–18, 19–35 |
| ESPN | Pts: Mennenga 22; Rebs: Mennenga 7 Asts: Jackson-Cartwright 11 | boxscore report | Pts: Cook 25; Rebs: Harrison 5 Asts: Batemon 4 | Attendance: 2,691 |

| 21 September 2024 | Cairns Taipans | 75–102 | Illawarra Hawks | Perth HPC, Perth |
| 18:30 | Scoring by quarter: 21–26, 24–28, 15–18, 15–30 |
| ESPN | Pts: Groves 19; Rebs: Bradshaw, Groves 7 Asts: Dufelmeier 3 | boxscore report | Pts: Days 20; Rebs: Days 12; Asts: Kell 4 | Attendance: 2,878 |

| 22 September 2024 | Adelaide 36ers | 94–102 | Sydney Kings | Perth Arena, Perth |
| 12:30 | Scoring by quarter: 28–27, 20–24, 27–19, 19–32 |
| Network 10 | Pts: Mayen, Vasiljevic 23; Rebs: Harrell 12; Asts: Davis 8 | boxscore report | Pts: Adams 25; Rebs: Cooks 13; Asts: Adams 7 | Attendance: 4,168 |

=== Round 2 ===
| 26 September 2024 | S.E. Melbourne Phoenix | 84–96 | Melbourne United | John Cain Arena, Melbourne |
| 19:30 | Scoring by quarter: 28–21, 12–25, 20–21, 24–29 |
| ESPN | Pts: Hurt 18; Rebs: Hunter, Hurt 7 Asts: Sobey, Walton 4 | boxscore report | Pts: Goulding 19; Rebs: White 8 Asts: Dellavedova 10 | Attendance: 10,175 |

| 27 September 2024 | Illawarra Hawks | 113–101 | Brisbane Bullets | Wollongong Entertainment Centre, Wollongong |
| 19:30 | Scoring by quarter: 38–25, 21–35, 30–20, 24–21 |
| ESPN | Pts: Kell 30; Rebs: Olbrich 8 Asts: Olbrich 5 | boxscore report | Pts: Cook 17; Rebs: Harrison 10; Asts: Prather 6 | Attendance: 3,542 |

| 27 September 2024 | Perth Wildcats | 87–88 | Sydney Kings | Perth Arena, Perth |
| 19:30 | Scoring by quarter: 11–27, 29–16, 18–24, 29–21 |
| ESPN | Pts: Doolittle 21; Rebs: Windler 16; Asts: Doolittle, Pepper 3 | boxscore report | Pts: Adams 27; Rebs: Oliver 7 Asts: Adams 6 | Attendance: 11,800 |

| 28 September 2024 | Cairns Taipans | 101–97 | Adelaide 36ers | Cairns Convention Centre, Cairns |
| 17:30 | Scoring by quarter: 28–32, 30–22, 19–23, 24–20 |
| ESPN | Pts: Edwards 31; Rebs: Waardenburg 11; Asts: Adnam 5 | boxscore report | Pts: Vasiljevic 24; Rebs: Dech 8 Asts: Davis 8 | Attendance: 4,141 |

| 28 September 2024 | Tasmania JackJumpers | 81–72 | Melbourne United | Derwent Entertainment Centre, Hobart |
| 20:00 | Scoring by quarter: 20–14, 24–19, 17–16, 20–23 |
| ESPN | Pts: Crawford 19; Rebs: Magnay 11; Asts: Doyle 3 | boxscore report | Pts: White 21; Rebs: White 12; Asts: Dellavedova 5 | Attendance: 4,340 |

| 29 September 2024 | Sydney Kings | 89–96 | Illawarra Hawks | Sydney SuperDome, Sydney |
| 14:30 | Scoring by quarter: 15–27, 32–21, 20–27, 22–21 |
| Network 10 | Pts: Cooks 22; Rebs: Cooks 12; Asts: Adams 9 | boxscore report | Pts: Harvey 21; Rebs: Froling 11; Asts: Hickey 4 | Attendance: 11,438 |

| 29 September 2024 | New Zealand Breakers | 81–79 | S.E. Melbourne Phoenix | Spark Arena, Auckland |
| 19:30 | Scoring by quarter: 11–21, 22–15, 27–23, 21–20 |
| 10 Bold | Pts: Jackson-Cartwright 19; Rebs: Mennenga 9 Asts: Jackson-Cartwright 7 | boxscore report | Pts: Sobey 24; Rebs: Hunter, Wieskamp 12; Asts: Glover, Sobey 4 | Attendance: 5,783 |

=== Round 3 ===
| 3 October 2024 | Adelaide 36ers | 93–83 | S.E. Melbourne Phoenix | Adelaide Entertainment Centre, Adelaide |
| 19:00 | Scoring by quarter: 25–16, 27–19, 19–23, 22–25 |
| ESPN | Pts: Humphries, Vasiljevic 22; Rebs: Davis 7 Asts: Martin 11 | boxscore report | Pts: Hurt 32; Rebs: Walton 11; Asts: Hunter 7 | Attendance: 9,377 |

| 4 October 2024 | Cairns Taipans | 90–78 | Tasmania JackJumpers | Cairns Convention Centre, Cairns |
| 19:30 | Scoring by quarter: 27–21, 26–16, 18–24, 19–17 |
| ESPN | Pts: Armstrong 20; Rebs: Waardenburg 7 Asts: Armstrong, Edwards 5 | boxscore report | Pts: Doyle 19; Rebs: Deng 9 Asts: Crawford, Drmic 4 | Attendance: 4,538 |

| 4 October 2024 | Perth Wildcats | 68–97 | Melbourne United | Perth Arena, Perth |
| 19:30 | Scoring by quarter: 22–31, 19–33, 13–19, 14–14 |
| ESPN | Pts: Doolittle, Henshall 12; Rebs: Pinder 10; Asts: Cotton 5 | boxscore report | Pts: Clark 25; Rebs: White 11; Asts: Ili 9 | Attendance: 12,287 |

| 5 October 2024 | Illawarra Hawks | 100–102 | Adelaide 36ers | Wollongong Entertainment Centre, Wollongong |
| 17:30 | Scoring by quarter: 32–27, 22–25, 27–29, 19–21 |
| ESPN | Pts: Kell 29; Rebs: Days 11; Asts: Kell 4 | boxscore report | Pts: Davis 32; Rebs: Harrell 10; Asts: Cadee, Davis 4 | Attendance: 4,770 |

| 5 October 2024 | Brisbane Bullets | 82–91 | Sydney Kings | Brisbane Entertainment Centre, Brisbane |
| 20:00 | Scoring by quarter: 17–22, 10–25, 28–28, 27–16 |
| ESPN | Pts: Prather 17; Rebs: Bannan 11; Asts: Harrison 5 | boxscore report | Pts: Cooks 23; Rebs: Cooks 7 Asts: Adams 10 | Attendance: 7,009 |

| 6 October 2024 | Melbourne United | 88–101 | Cairns Taipans | John Cain Arena, Melbourne |
| 14:30 | Scoring by quarter: 27–23, 27–35, 17–22, 17–21 |
| Network 10 | Pts: Goulding 22; Rebs: White 11; Asts: Dellavedova 7 | boxscore report | Pts: Edwards 23; Rebs: Bradshaw 9 Asts: three players 4 | Attendance: 9,766 |

| 6 October 2024 | Tasmania JackJumpers | 84–79(OT) | Perth Wildcats | Derwent Entertainment Centre, Hobart |
| 16:30 | Scoring by quarter: 9–23, 21–13, 17–17, 24–18, Overtime: 13–8 |
| 10 Bold | Pts: Doyle 20; Rebs: Magnay 13; Asts: Doyle 4 | boxscore report | Pts: Cotton 24; Rebs: Pinder 14; Asts: Cotton 4 | Attendance: 4,340 |

=== Round 4 ===
| 10 October 2024 | Cairns Taipans | 87–90 | Perth Wildcats | Cairns Convention Centre, Cairns |
| 18:30 | Scoring by quarter: 23–29, 18–19, 26–27, 20–15 |
| ESPN | Pts: Edwards 24; Rebs: Gak 10; Asts: Waardenburg 7 | boxscore report | Pts: Cotton 35; Rebs: Doolittle 11; Asts: Doolittle 4 | Attendance: 3,750 |

| 11 October 2024 | Adelaide 36ers | 89–79 | Sydney Kings | Adelaide Entertainment Centre, Adelaide |
| 19:00 | Scoring by quarter: 26–22, 23–15, 19–25, 21–17 |
| ESPN | Pts: Vasiljevic 26; Rebs: Harrell 14; Asts: three players 3 | boxscore report | Pts: Oliver 16; Rebs: Leaupepe 10; Asts: Robertson 5 | Attendance: 9,466 |

| 12 October 2024 | Illawarra Hawks | 109–76 | Tasmania JackJumpers | Wollongong Entertainment Centre, Wollongong |
| 17:30 | Scoring by quarter: 32–17, 25–22, 27–13, 25–24 |
| ESPN | Pts: Froling 21; Rebs: Days 9 Asts: Harvey 4 | boxscore report | Pts: Crawford 19; Rebs: Doyle 5 Asts: Crawford 5 | Attendance: 4,885 |

| 12 October 2024 | S.E. Melbourne Phoenix | 85–87 | Brisbane Bullets | John Cain Arena, Melbourne |
| 20:00 | Scoring by quarter: 23–18, 26–27, 17–23, 19–19 |
| ESPN | Pts: Hurt 24; Rebs: Hunter 7 Asts: Walton 5 | boxscore report | Pts: Harrison 21; Rebs: Harrison 17; Asts: Bannan 5 | Attendance: 6,521 |

| 13 October 2024 | Sydney Kings | 99–73 | Cairns Taipans | Sydney SuperDome, Sydney |
| 14:30 | Scoring by quarter: 28–18, 25–21, 23–18, 23–16 |
| Network 10 | Pts: Bruce 21; Rebs: Cooks, Leaupepe 10; Asts: three players 4 | boxscore report | Pts: Waardenburg 22; Rebs: Waardenburg 9 Asts: Adnam 5 | Attendance: 11,076 |

| 13 October 2024 | Melbourne United | 106–79 | Adelaide 36ers | John Cain Arena, Melbourne |
| 16:30 | Scoring by quarter: 24–29, 34–23, 21–8, 27–19 |
| 10 Bold | Pts: Clark 18; Rebs: White 7 Asts: Dellavedova 8 | boxscore report | Pts: Davis 17; Rebs: Harrell 9 Asts: Dech, Marshall 3 | Attendance: 9,050 |

=== Round 5 ===
| 17 October 2024 | Brisbane Bullets | 84–73 | New Zealand Breakers | Brisbane Entertainment Centre, Brisbane |
| 18:30 | Scoring by quarter: 17–13, 22–20, 19–17, 26–23 |
| ESPN | Pts: Batemon 21; Rebs: Bannan 9 Asts: three players 3 | boxscore report | Pts: Jackson-Cartwright 20; Rebs: Jackson-Cartwright 7 Asts: Jackson-Cartwright 6 | Attendance: 4,391 |

| 18 October 2024 | Tasmania JackJumpers | 71–80 | Sydney Kings | Silverdome, Launceston |
| 19:30 | Scoring by quarter: 21–13, 24–20, 8–16, 18–31 |
| ESPN | Pts: Crawford 25; Rebs: Doyle 7 Asts: Steindl 5 | boxscore report | Pts: Cooks 15; Rebs: Cooks 12; Asts: Cooks 6 | Attendance: 3,255 |

| 19 October 2024 | New Zealand Breakers | 89–85 | Perth Wildcats | Spark Arena, Auckland |
| 19:30 | Scoring by quarter: 24–18, 17–21, 27–19, 21–27 |
| ESPN | Pts: Mooney 28; Rebs: Gillespie 8 Asts: Jackson-Cartwright 9 | boxscore report | Pts: Webster 20; Rebs: Doolittle 11; Asts: Webster 6 | Attendance: 5,822 |

| 19 October 2024 | Cairns Taipans | 75–87 | Illawarra Hawks | Cairns Convention Centre, Cairns |
| 19:00 | Scoring by quarter: 24–17, 14–23, 20–19, 17–28 |
| ESPN | Pts: Bradshaw 18; Rebs: Bradshaw 14; Asts: Adnam, Waardenburg 4 | boxscore report | Pts: Harvey 20; Rebs: Froling 8 Asts: Kell 7 | Attendance: 4,362 |

| 20 October 2024 | Melbourne United | 84–93 | S.E. Melbourne Phoenix | John Cain Arena, Melbourne |
| 14:30 | Scoring by quarter: 18–16, 25–32, 20–18, 21–27 |
| 10 Bold | Pts: Clark 19; Rebs: White 10; Asts: Dellavedova 9 | boxscore report | Pts: Hunter 20; Rebs: Hunter 9 Asts: Glover 8 | Attendance: 10,175 |

| 20 October 2024 | Adelaide 36ers | 77–73 | Tasmania JackJumpers | Adelaide Entertainment Centre, Adelaide |
| 16:00 | Scoring by quarter: 13–22, 18–17, 23–11, 23–23 |
| 10 Bold | Pts: Davis 23; Rebs: Harrell, Humphries 7 Asts: Davis 6 | boxscore report | Pts: Doyle 22; Rebs: Deng 9 Asts: Crawford, Doyle 6 | Attendance: 9,384 |

=== Round 6 ===
| 24 October 2024 | New Zealand Breakers | 62–88 | S.E. Melbourne Phoenix | Wolfbrook Arena, Christchurch |
| 19:30 | Scoring by quarter: 17–27, 18–20, 16–18, 11–23 |
| ESPN | Pts: Jackson-Cartwright 19; Rebs: Mennenga 5 Asts: Jackson-Cartwright 6 | boxscore report | Pts: Hurt 19; Rebs: Hunter, Wieskamp 8 Asts: Sobey 7 | Attendance: 3,764 |

| 24 October 2024 | Illawarra Hawks | 87–92 | Melbourne United | Wollongong Entertainment Centre, Wollongong |
| 19:30 | Scoring by quarter: 21–18, 16–22, 21–19, 29–33 |
| ESPN | Pts: Hickey 17; Rebs: Days 8 Asts: Hickey 6 | boxscore report | Pts: Goulding 25; Rebs: White 19; Asts: Cameron, Clark 4 | Attendance: 3,558 |

| 25 October 2024 | Adelaide 36ers | 99–93(OT) | Cairns Taipans | Adelaide Entertainment Centre, Adelaide |
| 19:00 | Scoring by quarter: 21–27, 22–32, 22–14, 23–15, Overtime: 11–5 |
| ESPN | Pts: Harrell 36; Rebs: Harrell 16; Asts: Davis 8 | boxscore report | Pts: Edwards 27; Rebs: Waardenburg 14; Asts: Makoi 6 | Attendance: 9,382 |

| 25 October 2024 | Perth Wildcats | 87–84 | Sydney Kings | Perth Arena, Perth |
| 18:30 | Scoring by quarter: 21–21, 20–23, 24–16, 22–24 |
| ESPN | Pts: Pinder 34; Rebs: Doolittle 14; Asts: Henshall 8 | boxscore report | Pts: Cooks 22; Rebs: Cooks 11; Asts: Cooks 6 | Attendance: 11,114 |

| 26 October 2024 | S.E. Melbourne Phoenix | 82–88 | Illawarra Hawks | John Cain Arena, Melbourne |
| 17:30 | Scoring by quarter: 19–15, 20–30, 26–29, 17–14 |
| ESPN | Pts: Hurt 18; Rebs: Hurt 9 Asts: three players 3 | boxscore report | Pts: Harvey 22; Rebs: Days 7 Asts: Froling 7 | Attendance: 7,428 |

| 26 October 2024 | Brisbane Bullets | 79–87 | Tasmania JackJumpers | Brisbane Entertainment Centre, Brisbane |
| 19:00 | Scoring by quarter: 9–20, 23–22, 30–17, 17–28 |
| ESPN | Pts: Norton 20; Rebs: Harrison 10; Asts: Norton 5 | boxscore report | Pts: Crawford, Deng 16; Rebs: Magnay 9 Asts: Crawford 6 | Attendance: 4,756 |

| 27 October 2024 | Sydney Kings | 89–93 | New Zealand Breakers | Sydney SuperDome, Sydney |
| 14:30 | Scoring by quarter: 25–18, 20–31, 24–23, 20–21 |
| Network 10 | Pts: Le'afa 23; Rebs: Cooks, Leaupepe 7 Asts: Leaupepe 5 | boxscore report | Pts: Mooney 24; Rebs: López 10; Asts: Jackson-Cartwright 8 | Attendance: 10,078 |

| 27 October 2024 | Melbourne United | 106–63 | Cairns Taipans | John Cain Arena, Melbourne |
| 16:30 | Scoring by quarter: 23–12, 31–18, 30–19, 22–14 |
| 10 Bold | Pts: Cameron 18; Rebs: White 13; Asts: Bowen 5 | boxscore report | Pts: Antonio, Waardenburg 11; Rebs: Antonio, Higgins-Titsha 8 Asts: Waardenburg 4 | Attendance: 9,210 |

=== Round 7 ===
| 31 October 2024 | Melbourne United | 87–83 | Sydney Kings | John Cain Arena, Melbourne |
| 19:30 | Scoring by quarter: 21–20, 25–23, 20–21, 21–19 |
| ESPN | Pts: Dellavedova 16; Rebs: White 11; Asts: Dellavedova 5 | boxscore report | Pts: Cooks, Oliver 18; Rebs: Oliver 16; Asts: Adams 7 | Attendance: 6,734 |

| 1 November 2024 | Tasmania JackJumpers | 77–79 | S.E. Melbourne Phoenix | Silverdome, Launceston |
| 19:30 | Scoring by quarter: 19–19, 23–16, 15–20, 20–24 |
| ESPN | Pts: Magnay 19; Rebs: Krslovic 9 Asts: Crawford 6 | boxscore report | Pts: Hurt 24; Rebs: Sobey 7 Asts: Sobey 9 | Attendance: 3,255 |

| 1 November 2024 | Perth Wildcats | 113–105 | Illawarra Hawks | Perth Arena, Perth |
| 18:30 | Scoring by quarter: 39–31, 23–22, 27–30, 24–22 |
| ESPN | Pts: Henshall 26; Rebs: Pinder 6 Asts: Dootlittle 7 | boxscore report | Pts: Harvey 25; Rebs: Days 8 Asts: Lee 5 | Attendance: 10,421 |

| 2 November 2024 | New Zealand Breakers | 109–82 | Adelaide 36ers | Spark Arena, Auckland |
| 19:30 | Scoring by quarter: 33–19, 19–20, 34–19, 23–24 |
| ESPN | Pts: Jackson-Cartwright 25; Rebs: Bolden 9 Asts: Jackson-Cartwright 6 | boxscore report | Pts: Harrell 25; Rebs: Harrell 6 Asts: Davis 6 | Attendance: 5,537 |

| 2 November 2024 | Cairns Taipans | 88–92 | Brisbane Bullets | Cairns Convention Centre, Cairns |
| 19:00 | Scoring by quarter: 18–23, 26–18, 29–23, 15–28 |
| ESPN | Pts: Edwards 27; Rebs: Higgins-Titsha 11; Asts: Galloway, Makoi 4 | boxscore report | Pts: Batemon 21; Rebs: Harrison 20; Asts: Batemon Cook 3 | Attendance: 4,445 |

| 3 November 2024 | S.E. Melbourne Phoenix | 100–76 | Perth Wildcats | John Cain Arena, Melbourne |
| 14:30 | Scoring by quarter: 35–23, 19–21, 27–16, 19–16 |
| Network 10 | Pts: Sobey 20; Rebs: Hunter 9 Asts: Sobey 5 | boxscore report | Pts: Pepper 17; Rebs: Dootlittle 8 Asts: Henshall 3 | Attendance: 8,362 |

| 3 November 2024 | Sydney Kings | 88–60 | Tasmania JackJumpers | Sydney SuperDome, Sydney |
| 16:30 | Scoring by quarter: 27–19, 14–14, 26–18, 21–9 |
| 10 Bold | Pts: Noi 26; Rebs: Oliver 11; Asts: Adams, Cooks 4 | boxscore report | Pts: Crawford 12; Rebs: Krslovic 8 Asts: Doyle 4 | Attendance: 9,124 |

| 4 November 2024 | Melbourne United | 79–113 | New Zealand Breakers | John Cain Arena, Melbourne |
| 19:30 | Scoring by quarter: 13–25, 18–30, 21–29, 27–29 |
| ESPN | Pts: Cameron 20; Rebs: Bowen, Lee 5 Asts: Bowen 4 | boxscore report | Pts: Mennenga 25; Rebs: Bolden, López 10; Asts: Jackson-Cartwright 7 | Attendance: 9,275 |

=== Round 8 ===
| 7 November 2024 | Brisbane Bullets | 103–120 | Melbourne United | Brisbane Entertainment Centre, Brisbane |
| 18:30 | Scoring by quarter: 20–24, 25–28, 26–33, 32–33 |
| ESPN | Pts: Cook 23; Rebs: Prather 8 Asts: Cook 5 | boxscore report | Pts: Loe 30; Rebs: White 17; Asts: Dellavedova 6 | Attendance: 4,101 |

| 7 November 2024 | Perth Wildcats | 88–82 | Tasmania JackJumpers | Perth Arena, Perth |
| 18:30 | Scoring by quarter: 27–27, 20–24, 21–14, 20–17 |
| ESPN | Pts: Doolittle 18; Rebs: Doolittle 12; Asts: Webster 6 | boxscore report | Pts: Doyle 30; Rebs: Te Rangi 8 Asts: Crawford, Doyle 4 | Attendance: 10,793 |

| 8 November 2024 | Sydney Kings | 74–69 | S.E. Melbourne Phoenix | Sydney SuperDome, Sydney |
| 19:30 | Scoring by quarter: 14–22, 18–14, 17–20, 25–13 |
| ESPN | Pts: Adams 20; Rebs: Cooks 12; Asts: Adams 7 | boxscore report | Pts: Glover 17; Rebs: Lewis 8 Asts: Sobey 4 | Attendance: 8,052 |

| 9 November 2024 | Tasmania JackJumpers | 83–64 | New Zealand Breakers | Derwent Entertainment Centre, Hobart |
| 17:30 | Scoring by quarter: 20–27, 25–14, 19–3, 19–20 |
| ESPN | Pts: Crawford 19; Rebs: Krslovic 9 Asts: Doyle 5 | boxscore report | Pts: Jackson-Cartwright 15; Rebs: López, Mennenga 7 Asts: Jackson-Cartwright 9 | Attendance: 4,340 |

| 9 November 2024 | Melbourne United | 106–97 | Perth Wildcats | John Cain Arena, Melbourne |
| 20:00 | Scoring by quarter: 31–29, 20–36, 32–12, 23–20 |
| ESPN | Pts: Goulding 46; Rebs: Bowen, Ili 5 Asts: Dellavedova 12 | boxscore report | Pts: Doolittle 21; Rebs: Pinder 10; Asts: Doolittle, Webster 5 | Attendance: 7,885 |

| 10 November 2024 | S.E. Melbourne Phoenix | 97–74 | Cairns Taipans | John Cain Arena, Melbourne |
| 14:30 | Scoring by quarter: 34–20, 15–20, 17–15, 31–19 |
| Network 10 | Pts: Glover 22; Rebs: Hunter, Hurt 7 Asts: Sobey 9 | boxscore report | Pts: Waardenburg 16; Rebs: Armstrong, Gak 7 Asts: Makoi 7 | Attendance: 6,384 |

| 10 November 2024 | Adelaide 36ers | 93–79 | Illawarra Hawks | Adelaide Entertainment Centre, Adelaide |
| 16:00 | Scoring by quarter: 26–22, 24–19, 26–26, 17–12 |
| 10 Bold | Pts: Harrell 25; Rebs: Davis, Harrell 7 Asts: Davis 10 | boxscore report | Pts: Kell 18; Rebs: Days 8 Asts: Olbrich 4 | Attendance: 9,423 |

=== Round 9 ===
| 15 November 2024 | Tasmania JackJumpers | 95–92 | Brisbane Bullets | Derwent Entertainment Centre, Hobart |
| 19:30 | Scoring by quarter: 20–31, 23–15, 25–14, 27–32 |
| ESPN | Pts: Doyle 32; Rebs: Doyle, Magnay 7 Asts: Crawford, Macdonald 7 | boxscore report | Pts: Cook 23; Rebs: Bannan 9 Asts: Bannan, Prather 4 | Attendance: 4,340 |

| 15 November 2024 | Perth Wildcats | 97–84 | S.E. Melbourne Phoenix | Perth Arena, Perth |
| 18:30 | Scoring by quarter: 18–26, 40–22, 18–12, 21–24 |
| ESPN | Pts: Cotton 33; Rebs: Almansa 9 Asts: Doolittle 5 | boxscore report | Pts: Hurt 27; Rebs: Hurt 10; Asts: three players 3 | Attendance: 11,086 |

| 16 November 2024 | Cairns Taipans | 69–77 | New Zealand Breakers | Cairns Convention Centre, Cairns |
| 16:30 | Scoring by quarter: 23–28, 19–24, 17–11, 10–14 |
| ESPN | Pts: Edwards 33; Rebs: Gak 8 Asts: Armstrong 7 | boxscore report | Pts: Mooney 15; Rebs: Gillespie 8 Asts: Jackson-Cartwright 5 | Attendance: 4,767 |

| 16 November 2024 | Illawarra Hawks | 86–79 | Sydney Kings | Wollongong Entertainment Centre, Wollongong |
| 20:00 | Scoring by quarter: 22–22, 22–13, 23–19, 19–25 |
| ESPN | Pts: Kell 19; Rebs: three players 6 Asts: Kell 5 | boxscore report | Pts: Adams 23; Rebs: Cooks 10; Asts: Adams, Le'afa 6 | Attendance: 5,321 |

| 17 November 2024 | Melbourne United | 113–93 | Adelaide 36ers | John Cain Arena, Melbourne |
| 14:30 | Scoring by quarter: 29–22, 30–24, 26–27, 28–20 |
| Network 10 | Pts: Cameron 21; Rebs: Bowen 9 Asts: Dellavedova 7 | boxscore report | Pts: Davis 30; Rebs: Martin 9 Asts: Davis 11 | Attendance: 9,747 |

| 17 November 2024 | Brisbane Bullets | 105–84 | Perth Wildcats | Brisbane Entertainment Centre, Brisbane |
| 15:30 | Scoring by quarter: 25–26, 22–13, 27–26, 31–19 |
| 10 Bold | Pts: Batemon 51; Rebs: Bannan 9 Asts: Norton 6 | boxscore report | Pts: Pinder 27; Rebs: Windler 11; Asts: Windler 4 | Attendance: 6,086 |

=== Round 10 ===
| 28 November 2024 | Illawarra Hawks | 109–71 | New Zealand Breakers | Wollongong Entertainment Centre, Wollongong |
| 19:30 | Scoring by quarter: 32–12, 20–17, 20–27, 37–15 |
| ESPN | Pts: Olbrich 21; Rebs: three players 7 Asts: Harvey 5 | boxscore report | Pts: Jackson-Cartwright 19; Rebs: Mennenga 6 Asts: Jackson-Cartwright, McCarron 3 | Attendance: 3,774 |

| 29 November 2024 | Cairns Taipans | 75–81 | Sydney Kings | Cairns Convention Centre, Cairns |
| 18:30 | Scoring by quarter: 26–20, 16–21, 13–18, 20–22 |
| ESPN | Pts: Armstrong 28; Rebs: Waardenburg 10; Asts: Edwards, Waardenburg 2 | boxscore report | Pts: Oliver 26; Rebs: Oliver 9 Asts: Adams, Cooks 6 | Attendance: 3,899 |

| 29 November 2024 | Perth Wildcats | 117–89 | Brisbane Bullets | Perth Arena, Perth |
| 18:30 | Scoring by quarter: 31–24, 32–22, 28–13, 26–30 |
| ESPN | Pts: Doolittle 17; Rebs: three players 5 Asts: Doolittle 7 | boxscore report | Pts: Prather 31; Rebs: Zikarsky 8 Asts: Norton 4 | Attendance: 10,937 |

| 30 November 2024 | S.E. Melbourne Phoenix | 103–100 | Illawarra Hawks | John Cain Arena, Melbourne |
| 17:30 | Scoring by quarter: 21–31, 31–28, 26–17, 25–24 |
| ESPN | Pts: Hunter 23; Rebs: Hunter 6 Asts: Foxwell 7 | boxscore report | Pts: Harvey 19; Rebs: Days, Peatling 9 Asts: Harvey 5 | Attendance: 6,040 |

| 30 November 2024 | Adelaide 36ers | 73–77 | Tasmania JackJumpers | Adelaide Entertainment Centre, Adelaide |
| 19:30 | Scoring by quarter: 23–29, 19–14, 11–19, 20–17 |
| ESPN | Pts: Humphries 19; Rebs: Humphries 11; Asts: Rasmussen 4 | boxscore report | Pts: Macdonald, Magnay 15; Rebs: Doyle, Te Rangi 7 Asts: Drmic, Macdonald 5 | Attendance: 9,428 |

| 1 December 2024 | Melbourne United | 101–98 | Sydney Kings | John Cain Arena, Melbourne |
| 14:30 | Scoring by quarter: 27–28, 38–21, 14–26, 22–23 |
| Network 10 | Pts: Goulding 28; Rebs: White 12; Asts: Dellavedova 9 | boxscore report | Pts: Oliver 21; Rebs: Cooks 7 Asts: Adams 8 | Attendance: 10,175 |

| 1 December 2024 | Perth Wildcats | 123–112 | New Zealand Breakers | Perth Arena, Perth |
| 13:30 | Scoring by quarter: 42–24, 27–24, 24–37, 30–27 |
| 10 Bold | Pts: Cotton 59; Rebs: Almansa 8 Asts: Cotton 7 | boxscore report | Pts: Jackson-Cartwright 34; Rebs: Mennenga 8 Asts: Jackson-Cartwright 10 | Attendance: 12,505 |

=== Round 11 ===
| 5 December 2024 | New Zealand Breakers | 70–97 | Melbourne United | Wolfbrook Arena, Christchurch |
| 19:30 | Scoring by quarter: 24–28, 19–18, 7–24, 20–27 |
| ESPN | Pts: Mennenga, Mooney 17; Rebs: Anticevich 8 Asts: three players 2 | boxscore report | Pts: Loe 25; Rebs: White 10; Asts: Dellavedova 7 | Attendance: 3,818 |

| 5 December 2024 | Tasmania JackJumpers | 99–90 | Cairns Taipans | Derwent Entertainment Centre, Hobart |
| 19:30 | Scoring by quarter: 31–30, 21–24, 23–19, 24–17 |
| ESPN | Pts: Doyle 21; Rebs: Magnay 13; Asts: Doyle 7 | boxscore report | Pts: Armstrong 29; Rebs: Waardenburg 7 Asts: Waardenburg 6 | Attendance: 4,340 |

| 6 December 2024 | Brisbane Bullets | 102–83 | Adelaide 36ers | Brisbane Entertainment Centre, Brisbane |
| 18:30 | Scoring by quarter: 34–24, 19–23, 22–17, 27–19 |
| ESPN | Pts: Prather 33; Rebs: Harrison 18; Asts: Norton 5 | boxscore report | Pts: Humphries 16; Rebs: Humphries, Marshall 6 Asts: Rasmussen 5 | Attendance: 5,142 |

| 6 December 2024 | Perth Wildcats | 111–121 | Illawarra Hawks | Perth Arena, Perth |
| 18:30 | Scoring by quarter: 30–29, 23–26, 38–33, 20–33 |
| ESPN | Pts: Cotton 40; Rebs: Almansa 9 Asts: four players 4 | boxscore report | Pts: Kell 26; Rebs: Days 11; Asts: Harvey 6 | Attendance: 11,296 |

| 7 December 2024 | New Zealand Breakers | 83–98 | Sydney Kings | TSB Arena, Wellington |
| 19:30 | Scoring by quarter: 14–25, 26–27, 15–25, 28–21 |
| ESPN | Pts: Jackson-Cartwright 21; Rebs: three players 8 Asts: Jackson-Cartwright 6 | boxscore report | Pts: Adams, Cooks 20; Rebs: Toohey 8 Asts: Adams 10 | Attendance: 3,863 |

| 7 December 2024 | S.E. Melbourne Phoenix | 99–94 | Cairns Taipans | John Cain Arena, Melbourne |
| 20:00 | Scoring by quarter: 39–28, 24–22, 12–32, 24–12 |
| ESPN | Pts: Sobey 26; Rebs: Hurt 14; Asts: Foxwell 6 | boxscore report | Pts: Edwards 24; Rebs: Bradshaw 10; Asts: Waardenburg 5 | Attendance: 5,103 |

| 8 December 2024 | Melbourne United | 114–122 | Brisbane Bullets | John Cain Arena, Melbourne |
| 14:30 | Scoring by quarter: 28–28, 29–29, 30–31, 27–34 |
| Network 10 | Pts: Clark 24; Rebs: White 10; Asts: Dellavedova 7 | boxscore report | Pts: Cook, Prather 27; Rebs: Prather 7 Asts: Cook 5 | Attendance: 8,639 |

| 8 December 2024 | Adelaide 36ers | 105–115 | Perth Wildcats | Adelaide Entertainment Centre, Adelaide |
| 16:00 | Scoring by quarter: 32–29, 28–25, 22–25, 23–36 |
| 10 Bold | Pts: Davis 37; Rebs: Martin 7 Asts: Davis 11 | boxscore report | Pts: Cotton 49; Rebs: Almansa, Windler 7 Asts: Cotton, Henshall 4 | Attendance: 9,352 |

=== Round 12 ===
| 12 December 2024 | New Zealand Breakers | 76–100 | Tasmania JackJumpers | Eventfinda Stadium, Auckland |
| 19:30 | Scoring by quarter: 19–29, 23–30, 21–19, 13–22 |
| ESPN | Pts: Fall 16; Rebs: López 6 Asts: Jackson-Cartwright 4 | boxscore report | Pts: Crawford 24; Rebs: Doyle, Magnay 6 Asts: Magnay 8 | Attendance: 2,845 |

| 12 December 2024 | Brisbane Bullets | 116–108 | S.E. Melbourne Phoenix | Brisbane Entertainment Centre, Brisbane |
| 18:30 | Scoring by quarter: 26–34, 22–25, 34–24, 34–25 |
| ESPN | Pts: Cook 33; Rebs: Harrison 12; Asts: Cook 4 | boxscore report | Pts: Hurt 27; Rebs: Hurt, Lewis 5 Asts: Glover 7 | Attendance: 3,757 |

| 13 December 2024 | Melbourne United | 93–106 | Illawarra Hawks | John Cain Arena, Melbourne |
| 19:30 | Scoring by quarter: 24–27, 23–19, 15–27, 31–33 |
| ESPN | Pts: Loe 19; Rebs: Koppens 9 Asts: Dellavedova 8 | boxscore report | Pts: Harvey 31; Rebs: Froling 11; Asts: Harvey 4 | Attendance: 7,692 |

| 14 December 2024 | Adelaide 36ers | 111–94 | New Zealand Breakers | Adelaide Entertainment Centre, Adelaide |
| 17:00 | Scoring by quarter: 22–22, 36–27, 20–27, 33–18 |
| ESPN | Pts: Davis 36; Rebs: Harrell 10; Asts: Davis 9 | boxscore report | Pts: Jackson-Cartwright 25; Rebs: Fall 10; Asts: Jackson-Cartwright 8 | Attendance: 9,449 |

| 14 December 2024 | Cairns Taipans | 92–128 | Perth Wildcats | Cairns Convention Centre, Cairns |
| 19:00 | Scoring by quarter: 28–22, 29–32, 18–39, 17–35 |
| ESPN | Pts: Armstrong 24; Rebs: Edwards 6 Asts: Armstrong 8 | boxscore report | Pts: Cotton 44; Rebs: Pinder 10; Asts: Cotton 6 | Attendance: 4,386 |

| 15 December 2024 | S.E. Melbourne Phoenix | 109–97 | Melbourne United | John Cain Arena, Melbourne |
| 14:30 | Scoring by quarter: 24–36, 27–23, 32–20, 26–18 |
| Network 10 | Pts: Hurt 28; Rebs: Hunter 8 Asts: Sobey, Walton 7 | boxscore report | Pts: Clark 20; Rebs: White 5 Asts: Dellavedova 8 | Attendance: 9,437 |

| 15 December 2024 | Sydney Kings | 93–81 | Brisbane Bullets | Sydney SuperDome, Sydney |
| 16:30 | Scoring by quarter: 25–25, 23–29, 18–19, 27–8 |
| 10 Bold | Pts: Adams 32; Rebs: Cooks 11; Asts: Cooks 5 | boxscore report | Pts: Prather 28; Rebs: Prather 9 Asts: Cook, Norton 4 | Attendance: 11,576 |

=== Round 13 ===
| 20 December 2024 | New Zealand Breakers | 84–92 | Sydney Kings | Spark Arena, Auckland |
| 19:30 | Scoring by quarter: 19–15, 32–29, 18–23, 15–25 |
| ESPN | Pts: Jackson-Cartwright 25; Rebs: Bolden, Fall 9 Asts: Jackson-Cartwright 8 | boxscore report | Pts: Noi 26; Rebs: Toohey 11; Asts: Adams 9 | Attendance: 5,006 |

| 20 December 2024 | Brisbane Bullets | 107–104 | Cairns Taipans | Brisbane Entertainment Centre, Brisbane |
| 18:30 | Scoring by quarter: 29–30, 27–24, 25–26, 26–24 |
| ESPN | Pts: Prather 35; Rebs: Bannan, Cook 6 Asts: Batemon 7 | boxscore report | Pts: Edwards 27; Rebs: Groves 10; Asts: Armstrong 5 | Attendance: 4,599 |

| 21 December 2024 | S.E. Melbourne Phoenix | 106–86 | Adelaide 36ers | John Cain Arena, Melbourne |
| 20:00 | Scoring by quarter: 26–22, 30–16, 27–33, 23–15 |
| ESPN | Pts: Walton 28; Rebs: Hunter 8 Asts: Sobey 9 | boxscore report | Pts: Davis 24; Rebs: Humphries 10; Asts: Davis 8 | Attendance: 10,175 |

| 22 December 2024 | Illawarra Hawks | 120–88 | Perth Wildcats | Wollongong Entertainment Centre, Wollongong |
| 14:30 | Scoring by quarter: 37–28, 26–20, 26–15, 31–25 |
| Network 10 | Pts: Kell 31; Rebs: Froling 6 Asts: Kell 5 | boxscore report | Pts: Pinder 16; Rebs: H.Harris, Windler 4 Asts: Henshall 4 | Attendance: 5,462 |

| 23 December 2024 | Melbourne United | 91–97 | Tasmania JackJumpers | John Cain Arena, Melbourne |
| 19:30 | Scoring by quarter: 26–36, 21–15, 20–17, 24–29 |
| ESPN | Pts: Goulding 18; Rebs: White 9 Asts: Dellavedova 9 | boxscore report | Pts: Crawford 16; Rebs: Deng 7 Asts: Crawford 6 | Attendance: 10,175 |

| 24 December 2024 | Adelaide 36ers | 90–111 | Brisbane Bullets | Adelaide Entertainment Centre, Adelaide |
| 17:00 | Scoring by quarter: 23–24, 25–27, 22–27, 20–33 |
| ESPN | Pts: Davis 32; Rebs: Harrell 9 Asts: Davis 8 | boxscore report | Pts: Prather 36; Rebs: Harrison 12; Asts: Norton, Prather 5 | Attendance: 9,457 |

| 25 December 2024 | Tasmania JackJumpers | 97–82 | New Zealand Breakers | Derwent Entertainment Centre, Hobart |
| 18:00 | Scoring by quarter: 20–18, 22–21, 22–19, 33–24 |
| ESPN | Pts: Crawford 26; Rebs: Deng 7 Asts: Doyle 5 | boxscore report | Pts: Jackson-Cartwright 23; Rebs: Fall 9 Asts: Jackson-Cartwright 6 | Attendance: 4,340 |

| 25 December 2024 | Sydney Kings | 108–111 | Illawarra Hawks | Sydney SuperDome, Sydney |
| 20:30 | Scoring by quarter: 31–23, 27–35, 23–30, 27–23 |
| Network 10 | Pts: Toohey 25; Rebs: Leaupepe 12; Asts: Adams 7 | boxscore report | Pts: Kell 26; Rebs: Lee 8 Asts: Kell 8 | Attendance: 8,589 |

=== Round 14 ===
| 26 December 2024 | Cairns Taipans | 66–76 | Melbourne United | Cairns Convention Centre, Cairns |
| 18:30 | Scoring by quarter: 13–25, 16–21, 22–13, 15–17 |
| ESPN | Pts: Groves 20; Rebs: Groves, Waardenburg 6 Asts: Armstrong, Groves 4 | boxscore report | Pts: Goulding 19; Rebs: Lee 10; Asts: Dellavedova 6 | Attendance: 4,428 |

| 27 December 2024 | Brisbane Bullets | 84–102 | Illawarra Hawks | Brisbane Entertainment Centre, Brisbane |
| 18:30 | Scoring by quarter: 34–29, 16–19, 18–34, 16–20 |
| ESPN | Pts: Prather 28; Rebs: Harrison 9 Asts: Naar, Smith-Milner 2 | boxscore report | Pts: Kell 18; Rebs: Froling 12; Asts: Hickey, Kell 4 | Attendance: 6,405 |

| 28 December 2024 | Adelaide 36ers | 92–116 | Perth Wildcats | Adelaide Entertainment Centre, Adelaide |
| 19:30 | Scoring by quarter: 26–26, 16–29, 21–23, 29–38 |
| ESPN | Pts: Vasiljevic 23; Rebs: Humphries 8 Asts: Davis 10 | boxscore report | Pts: Windler 24; Rebs: Pinder 9 Asts: Cotton 12 | Attendance: 9,495 |

| 29 December 2024 | Tasmania JackJumpers | 95–86 | Brisbane Bullets | Derwent Entertainment Centre, Hobart |
| 14:30 | Scoring by quarter: 22–21, 30–23, 18–14, 25–28 |
| Network 10 | Pts: Doyle 23; Rebs: Te Rangi 7 Asts: Crawford 8 | boxscore report | Pts: Cook 20; Rebs: Harrison 12; Asts: Norton 6 | Attendance: 4,340 |

| 30 December 2024 | Sydney Kings | 96–111 | Adelaide 36ers | Sydney SuperDome, Sydney |
| 19:30 | Scoring by quarter: 12–32, 31–30, 25–28, 28–21 |
| ESPN | Pts: Adams 41; Rebs: Cooks 15; Asts: Le'afa 3 | boxscore report | Pts: Davis 30; Rebs: Harrell 10; Asts: Davis 9 | Attendance: 11,765 |

| 31 December 2024 | Illawarra Hawks | 105–110 | S.E. Melbourne Phoenix | Wollongong Entertainment Centre, Wollongong |
| 17:30 | Scoring by quarter: 25–30, 34–30, 25–24, 21–26 |
| ESPN | Pts: Harvey 20; Rebs: Froling 10; Asts: Hickey 4 | boxscore report | Pts: Sobey 25; Rebs: Wieskamp 6 Asts: Walton 11 | Attendance: 5,487 |

| 31 December 2024 | Cairns Taipans | 68–92 | New Zealand Breakers | Cairns Convention Centre, Cairns |
| 18:30 | Scoring by quarter: 15–21, 22–26, 17–25, 14–20 |
| ESPN | Pts: Groves 21; Rebs: Groves 8 Asts: Armstrong 5 | boxscore report | Pts: Mooney 23; Rebs: Fall 12; Asts: Mooney 10 | Attendance: 4,870 |

=== Round 15 ===
| 2 January 2025 | Sydney Kings | 110–101 | S.E. Melbourne Phoenix | Sydney SuperDome, Sydney |
| 19:30 | Scoring by quarter: 28–30, 19–30, 25–25, 38–16 |
| ESPN | Pts: Adams 32; Rebs: Cooks 10; Asts: Adams 9 | boxscore report | Pts: Sobey 23; Rebs: Hurt 11; Asts: Sobey, Walton 4 | Attendance: 9,139 |

| 3 January 2025 | Illawarra Hawks | 105–108 | Cairns Taipans | Wollongong Entertainment Centre, Wollongong |
| 19:30 | Scoring by quarter: 24–19, 32–26, 21–40, 28–23 |
| ESPN | Pts: Harvey 23; Rebs: Kell 9 Asts: Kell, Hickey 6 | boxscore report | Pts: Armstrong, Edwards 28; Rebs: Bradshaw, Groves 9 Asts: three players 3 | Attendance: 5,087 |

| 4 January 2025 | Adelaide 36ers | 100–81 | Melbourne United | Adelaide Entertainment Centre, Adelaide |
| 17:00 | Scoring by quarter: 27–17, 28–25, 22–20, 23–19 |
| ESPN | Pts: Davis, Harrell 28; Rebs: Harrell 9 Asts: Davis 11 | boxscore report | Pts: Goulding 18; Rebs: Loe 12; Asts: Dellavedova 9 | Attendance: 9,588 |

| 4 January 2025 | Brisbane Bullets | 86–91 | Sydney Kings | Brisbane Entertainment Centre, Brisbane |
| 19:00 | Scoring by quarter: 29–28, 19–17, 23–24, 15–22 |
| ESPN | Pts: Prather 18; Rebs: Harrison 14; Asts: Cook 5 | boxscore report | Pts: Adams 21; Rebs: Oliver 9 Asts: Adams 8 | Attendance: 7,028 |

| 5 January 2025 | New Zealand Breakers | 86–96 | Perth Wildcats | Spark Arena, Auckland |
| 16:30 | Scoring by quarter: 24–30, 20–25, 28–19, 14–22 |
| Network 10 | Pts: Fall, Mooney 28; Rebs: Fall 9 Asts: Mooney 6 | boxscore report | Pts: Cotton 41; Rebs: Windler 7 Asts: Cotton 5 | Attendance: 4,781 |

| 5 January 2025 | Tasmania JackJumpers | 91–105 | S.E. Melbourne Phoenix | Derwent Entertainment Centre, Hobart |
| 16:30 | Scoring by quarter: 16–26, 33–30, 23–28, 19–21 |
| 10 Bold | Pts: Crawford 16; Rebs: four players 4 Asts: Macdonald 7 | boxscore report | Pts: Hurt 20; Rebs: Hunter 8 Asts: Walton 6 | Attendance: 4,340 |

| 7 January 2025 | Illawarra Hawks | 89–84 | Tasmania JackJumpers | Wollongong Entertainment Centre, Wollongong |
| 19:30 | Scoring by quarter: 20–18, 29–18, 14–22, 26–26 |
| ESPN | Pts: Kell 19; Rebs: Kell 7 Asts: three players 4 | boxscore report | Pts: Macdonald 19; Rebs: Doyle, Krslovic 10; Asts: Doyle 7 | Attendance: 4,551 |

| 8 January 2025 | Brisbane Bullets | 83–74 | New Zealand Breakers | Brisbane Entertainment Centre, Brisbane |
| 18:30 | Scoring by quarter: 15–17, 23–18, 20–15, 25–24 |
| ESPN | Pts: Prather 31; Rebs: Prather 10; Asts: Prather 6 | boxscore report | Pts: Mooney 21; Rebs: Mennenga 9 Asts: Bolden, McCarron 2 | Attendance: 5,341 |

=== Round 16 ===
| 9 January 2025 | Sydney Kings | 88–90 | Melbourne United | Sydney SuperDome, Sydney |
| 19:30 | Scoring by quarter: 16–32, 25–25, 23–13, 24–20 |
| ESPN | Pts: Cooks 21; Rebs: Cooks 10; Asts: Cooks 5 | boxscore report | Pts: White 23; Rebs: White 10; Asts: Dellavedova 8 | Attendance: 10,328 |

| 10 January 2025 | Tasmania JackJumpers | 104–103(OT) | Adelaide 36ers | Derwent Entertainment Centre, Hobart |
| 19:30 | Scoring by quarter: 30–22, 11–31, 24–21, 30–21, Overtime: 9–8 |
| ESPN | Pts: Deng 26; Rebs: Deng 8 Asts: Doyle 9 | boxscore report | Pts: Davis 39; Rebs: Humphries 10; Asts: Davis, Harrell 7 | Attendance: 4,340 |

| 11 January 2025 | Illawarra Hawks | 108–100 | New Zealand Breakers | Wollongong Entertainment Centre, Wollongong |
| 17:30 | Scoring by quarter: 35–28, 34–20, 19–22, 20–30 |
| ESPN | Pts: Kell 31; Rebs: three players 6 Asts: Olbrich 6 | boxscore report | Pts: Mooney 33; Rebs: Fall 5 Asts: Mooney 8 | Attendance: 5,562 |

| 11 January 2025 | S.E. Melbourne Phoenix | 105–86 | Brisbane Bullets | Gippsland Indoor Stadium, Traralgon |
| 20:00 | Scoring by quarter: 17–21, 30–33, 22–14, 36–18 |
| ESPN | Pts: Hurt 32; Rebs: Hurt 12; Asts: Sobey 7 | boxscore report | Pts: Bannan 23; Rebs: Prather 11; Asts: Prather 2 | Attendance: 3,082 |

| 12 January 2025 | Tasmania JackJumpers | 73–105 | Perth Wildcats | Derwent Entertainment Centre, Hobart |
| 14:30 | Scoring by quarter: 22–29, 20–35, 18–28, 13–13 |
| Network 10 | Pts: Crawford 16; Rebs: Hummer 8 Asts: Doyle 4 | boxscore report | Pts: Cotton 32; Rebs: Windler 11; Asts: Cotton 9 | Attendance: 4,340 |

| 12 January 2025 | Sydney Kings | 91–87 | Cairns Taipans | Sydney SuperDome, Sydney |
| 16:30 | Scoring by quarter: 17–19, 22–19, 25–24, 27–25 |
| 10 Bold | Pts: Noi 27; Rebs: Oliver 17; Asts: Adams 5 | boxscore report | Pts: Edwards 25; Rebs: Edwards 7 Asts: Waardenburg 4 | Attendance: 10,224 |

| 13 January 2025 | New Zealand Breakers | 89–91 | Melbourne United | TSB Stadium, New Plymouth |
| 19:30 | Scoring by quarter: 26–25, 16–16, 29–21, 18–29 |
| ESPN | Pts: López, Mooney 19; Rebs: Fall 9 Asts: Mooney 8 | boxscore report | Pts: Goulding 42; Rebs: White 13; Asts: Dellavedova 6 | Attendance: 2,110 |

| 13 January 2025 | Adelaide 36ers | 91–88 | Illawarra Hawks | Adelaide Entertainment Centre, Adelaide |
| 19:00 | Scoring by quarter: 33–25, 30–18, 12–19, 16–26 |
| ESPN | Pts: Harrell 26; Rebs: Harrell, Martin 9 Asts: Davis 7 | boxscore report | Pts: Froling 35; Rebs: Froling 13; Asts: Harvey 6 | Attendance: 9,475 |

| 14 January 2025 | Cairns Taipans | 102–113 | S.E. Melbourne Phoenix | Cairns Convention Centre, Cairns |
| 18:30 | Scoring by quarter: 28–33, 31–25, 19–24, 24–31 |
| ESPN | Pts: Waardenburg 22; Rebs: Groves 7 Asts: Armstrong 6 | boxscore report | Pts: Hurt 33; Rebs: Hunter 18; Asts: Foxwell 5 | Attendance: 3,779 |

| 15 January 2025 | Brisbane Bullets | 85–112 | Perth Wildcats | Brisbane Entertainment Centre, Brisbane |
| 18:30 | Scoring by quarter: 27–27, 15–38, 24–20, 19–27 |
| ESPN | Pts: Prather 32; Rebs: Bannan, Prather 11; Asts: Cook 5 | boxscore report | Pts: Cotton 36; Rebs: Pinder, Windler 6 Asts: Doolittle 4 | Attendance: 4,491 |

=== Round 17 ===
| 16 January 2025 | New Zealand Breakers | 85–75 | Tasmania JackJumpers | Spark Arena, Auckland |
| 19:30 | Scoring by quarter: 19–8, 20–37, 22–17, 24–13 |
| ESPN | Pts: Mennenga 29; Rebs: Mennenga 9 Asts: Mooney 11 | boxscore report | Pts: Crawford 26; Rebs: Drmic 7 Asts: Doyle 5 | Attendance: 4,818 |

| 17 January 2025 | Brisbane Bullets | 80–111 | Cairns Taipans | Brisbane Entertainment Centre, Brisbane |
| 18:30 | Scoring by quarter: 24–31, 21–31, 20–20, 15–29 |
| ESPN | Pts: Prather 22; Rebs: Bannan 12; Asts: Adams, Norton 3 | boxscore report | Pts: Edwards 35; Rebs: Groves 8 Asts: Adnam 6 | Attendance: 5,587 |

| 17 January 2025 | Perth Wildcats | 110–103 | Adelaide 36ers | Perth Arena, Perth |
| 18:30 | Scoring by quarter: 22–24, 30–17, 24–32, 34–30 |
| ESPN | Pts: Doolittle 27; Rebs: Doolittle 10; Asts: Cotton 7 | boxscore report | Pts: Davis 31; Rebs: Harrell 9 Asts: Davis 10 | Attendance: 13,570 |

| 18 January 2025 | S.E. Melbourne Phoenix | 102–89 | New Zealand Breakers | State Basketball Centre, Melbourne |
| 17:30 | Scoring by quarter: 30–17, 19–27, 27–21, 26–24 |
| ESPN | Pts: Sobey 28; Rebs: Hunter 9 Asts: Sobey 9 | boxscore report | Pts: López, Mooney 20; Rebs: Bolden 10; Asts: Jackson-Cartwright 6 | Attendance: 3,422 |

| 18 January 2025 | Illawarra Hawks | 117–95 | Melbourne United | Wollongong Entertainment Centre, Wollongong |
| 20:00 | Scoring by quarter: 29–25, 29–21, 27–20, 32–29 |
| ESPN | Pts: Kell 23; Rebs: Froling 10; Asts: Harvey 9 | boxscore report | Pts: Ili 20; Rebs: Loe 9 Asts: Dellavedova 8 | Attendance: 5,021 |

| 19 January 2025 | Sydney Kings | 88–77 | Tasmania JackJumpers | Sydney SuperDome, Sydney |
| 14:30 | Scoring by quarter: 16–15, 22–19, 18–21, 32–22 |
| Network 10 | Pts: Noi 32; Rebs: Cooks 9 Asts: Adams 6 | boxscore report | Pts: Doyle 21; Rebs: Doyle 7 Asts: Crawford, Doyle 4 | Attendance: 16,705 |

| 19 January 2025 | Cairns Taipans | 75–99 | Adelaide 36ers | Cairns Convention Centre, Cairns |
| 15:30 | Scoring by quarter: 12–38, 25–22, 21–22, 17–17 |
| 10 Bold | Pts: Groves 23; Rebs: Gak 10; Asts: Armstrong 5 | boxscore report | Pts: Vasiljevic 32; Rebs: Harrell 15; Asts: Davis 9 | Attendance: 4,109 |

| 20 January 2025 | Illawarra Hawks | 121–87 | Brisbane Bullets | Wollongong Entertainment Centre, Wollongong |
| 19:30 | Scoring by quarter: 35–20, 21–21, 35–19, 30–27 |
| ESPN | Pts: Froling 17; Rebs: three players 7 Asts: Kell 11 | boxscore report | Pts: Cook 19; Rebs: Cook 8 Asts: Bannan 5 | Attendance: 4,358 |

| 22 January 2025 | S.E. Melbourne Phoenix | 92–103 | Sydney Kings | State Basketball Centre, Melbourne |
| 19:30 | Scoring by quarter: 22–26, 23–36, 23–17, 24–24 |
| ESPN | Pts: Sobey 28; Rebs: Hurt 10; Asts: Glover, Sobey 4 | boxscore report | Pts: Noi 24; Rebs: Oliver 7 Asts: Adams 9 | Attendance: 3,422 |

| 22 January 2025 | Perth Wildcats | 93–99 | Melbourne United | Perth Arena, Perth |
| 18:30 | Scoring by quarter: 23–21, 20–25, 25–25, 25–28 |
| ESPN | Pts: Doolittle 33; Rebs: Doolittle, Pinder 7 Asts: Cotton 5 | boxscore report | Pts: White 26; Rebs: White 16; Asts: Dellavedova 7 | Attendance: 12,505 |

=== Round 18 ===
| 23 January 2025 | Cairns Taipans | 100–94 | Illawarra Hawks | Cairns Convention Centre, Cairns |
| 18:30 | Scoring by quarter: 31–17, 23–20, 17–27, 29–30 |
| ESPN | Pts: Edwards 22; Rebs: Groves 9 Asts: Bradshaw 5 | boxscore report | Pts: Blanchfield, Harvey 17; Rebs: Hickey 8 Asts: Hickey 5 | Attendance: 3,845 |

| 24 January 2025 | New Zealand Breakers | 87–93 | Brisbane Bullets | Wolfbrook Arena, Christchurch |
| 19:30 | Scoring by quarter: 19–21, 21–25, 23–20, 24–27 |
| ESPN | Pts: Mooney 24; Rebs: Bolden 8 Asts: Jackson-Cartwright 9 | boxscore report | Pts: Cook 26; Rebs: Prather 8 Asts: Cook 6 | Attendance: 4,196 |

| 24 January 2025 | Sydney Kings | 96–105 | Adelaide 36ers | Sydney SuperDome, Sydney |
| | Scoring by quarter: 23–34, 32–18, 18–26, 23–27 |
| ESPN | Pts: Adams 43; Rebs: Oliver 14; Asts: Adams 7 | boxscore report | Pts: Davis 30; Rebs: Harrell 11; Asts: Davis 6 | Attendance: 10,356 |

| 25 January 2025 | S.E. Melbourne Phoenix | 116–80 | Tasmania JackJumpers | State Basketball Centre, Melbourne |
| 17:30 | Scoring by quarter: 19–23, 27–22, 29–17, 41–18 |
| ESPN | Pts: Hurt 29; Rebs: Wieskamp 9 Asts: Sobey 10 | boxscore report | Pts: Crawford 18; Rebs: Krslovic 8 Asts: Crawford 5 | Attendance: 3,422 |

| 25 January 2025 | Perth Wildcats | 116–125(2OT) | Cairns Taipans | Perth Arena, Perth |
| 17:00 | Scoring by quarter: 18–22, 29–34, 35–17, 18–27, Overtime: 10–10, 6–15 |
| ESPN | Pts: Cotton 38; Rebs: Pinder 11; Asts: Doolittle 4 | boxscore report | Pts: Edwards 30; Rebs: Bradshaw 13; Asts: Waardenburg 9 | Attendance: 13,269 |

| 26 January 2025 | Brisbane Bullets | 88–115 | Melbourne United | Brisbane Entertainment Centre, Brisbane |
| 13:30 | Scoring by quarter: 26–26, 14–35, 21–26, 27–28 |
| Network 10 | Pts: Adams 23; Rebs: Smith-Milner 8 Asts: Adams 4 | boxscore report | Pts: Clark 24; Rebs: Loe 8 Asts: Ili 8 | Attendance: 7,229 |

| 26 January 2025 | Adelaide 36ers | 94–78 | New Zealand Breakers | Adelaide Entertainment Centre, Adelaide |
| 16:00 | Scoring by quarter: 27–15, 30–20, 22–23, 15–20 |
| 10 Bold | Pts: Harrell 26; Rebs: Harrell 8 Asts: Davis 13 | boxscore report | Pts: King 20; Rebs: López 11; Asts: Mooney 9 | Attendance: 9,505 |

=== Round 19 ===
| 30 January 2025 | Tasmania JackJumpers | 78–102 | Illawarra Hawks | Derwent Entertainment Centre, Hobart |
| 19:30 | Scoring by quarter: 13–21, 21–31, 25–25, 19–25 |
| ESPN | Pts: Doyle 17; Rebs: Krslovic 9 Asts: Crawford 7 | boxscore report | Pts: Froling 18; Rebs: Froling 7 Asts: Harvey 5 | Attendance: 4,340 |

| 31 January 2025 | Adelaide 36ers | 89–92 | Brisbane Bullets | Adelaide Entertainment Centre, Adelaide |
| 19:00 | Scoring by quarter: 21–22, 24–20, 18–26, 26–24 |
| ESPN | Pts: Davis 24; Rebs: Harrell, Vasiljevic 10; Asts: Davis 10 | boxscore report | Pts: Prather 26; Rebs: Smith-Milner 10; Asts: three players 4 | Attendance: 9,521 |

| 31 January 2025 | Perth Wildcats | 100–99 | S.E. Melbourne Phoenix | Perth Arena, Perth |
| 18:30 | Scoring by quarter: 27–26, 22–23, 17–28, 34–22 |
| ESPN | Pts: Cotton 29; Rebs: Doolittle 13; Asts: Cotton, Doolittle 6 | boxscore report | Pts: Hurt 19; Rebs: Hunter 13; Asts: four players 3 | Attendance: 13,156 |

| 1 February 2025 | New Zealand Breakers | 99–92 | Cairns Taipans | Spark Arena, Auckland |
| 19:30 | Scoring by quarter: 26–28, 28–21, 25–15, 20–28 |
| ESPN | Pts: Mooney 24; Rebs: Bolden, Fall 9 Asts: Mooney 8 | boxscore report | Pts: Bradshaw, Waardenburg 16; Rebs: Waardenburg 6 Asts: Armstrong 8 | Attendance: 5,625 |

| 1 February 2025 | Melbourne United | 94–92 | Tasmania JackJumpers | John Cain Arena, Melbourne |
| 20:00 | Scoring by quarter: 21–32, 30–29, 17–16, 26–15 |
| ESPN | Pts: Ili 18; Rebs: Lee 10; Asts: Dellavedova 8 | boxscore report | Pts: Crawford 20; Rebs: Krslovic 6 Asts: Doyle 7 | Attendance: 10,175 |

| 2 February 2025 | Sydney Kings | 97–104 | Perth Wildcats | Sydney SuperDome, Sydney |
| 14:30 | Scoring by quarter: 21–32, 27–24, 26–29, 23–19 |
| Network 10 | Pts: Noi 24; Rebs: Cooks 12; Asts: Maluach 5 | boxscore report | Pts: Cotton 30; Rebs: Pinder 10; Asts: Cotton 4 | Attendance: 14,112 |

| 2 February 2025 | S.E. Melbourne Phoenix | 105–99 | Adelaide 36ers | John Cain Arena, Melbourne |
| 16:30 | Scoring by quarter: 30–23, 31–20, 18–34, 26–22 |
| 10 Bold | Pts: Sobey 26; Rebs: Hurt 10; Asts: Sobey 8 | boxscore report | Pts: Harrell 25; Rebs: Harrell 11; Asts: Davis 7 | Attendance: 8,230 |

=== Round 20 ===
| 5 February 2025 | New Zealand Breakers | 82–96 | Illawarra Hawks | Spark Arena, Auckland |
| 19:30 | Scoring by quarter: 17–27, 23–22, 19–33, 23–14 |
| ESPN | Pts: Fall 16; Rebs: López, Mennenga 6 Asts: McCarron 5 | boxscore report | Pts: Harvey 29; Rebs: Peatling 7 Asts: Hickey 9 | Attendance: 6,223 |

| 6 February 2025 | Cairns Taipans | 100–88 | Brisbane Bullets | Cairns Convention Centre, Cairns |
| 18:30 | Scoring by quarter: 32–26, 16–22, 25–23, 27–17 |
| ESPN | Pts: Armstrong 28; Rebs: Armstrong 10; Asts: Armstrong 10 | boxscore report | Pts: Cook 28; Rebs: Cook, Smith-Milner 7 Asts: Cook 6 | Attendance: 4,145 |

| 7 February 2025 | Illawarra Hawks | 95–75 | Sydney Kings | Wollongong Entertainment Centre, Wollongong |
| 19:30 | Scoring by quarter: 29–24, 21–15, 15–22, 30–14 |
| ESPN | Pts: Harvey, Lee 15; Rebs: Froling 11; Asts: Hickey 8 | boxscore report | Pts: Adams, Noi 14; Rebs: Toohey 9 Asts: Adams 4 | Attendance: 5,460 |

| 7 February 2025 | Perth Wildcats | 112–104 | Adelaide 36ers | Perth Arena, Perth |
| 18:30 | Scoring by quarter: 20–27, 29–29, 32–22, 31–26 |
| ESPN | Pts: Cotton 49; Rebs: Winder 12; Asts: Doolittle 9 | boxscore report | Pts: Davis 34; Rebs: Dech, Harrell 6 Asts: Davis 8 | Attendance: 13,599 |

| 8 February 2025 | Tasmania JackJumpers | 90–83 | Cairns Taipans | Derwent Entertainment Centre, Hobart |
| 17:30 | Scoring by quarter: 26–20, 23–21, 16–19, 25–23 |
| ESPN | Pts: Deng 21; Rebs: Deng 7 Asts: three players 4 | boxscore report | Pts: Groves 17; Rebs: Groves 8 Asts: Armstrong, Bradshaw 4 | Attendance: 4,340 |

| 8 February 2025 | Melbourne United | 103–93 | S.E. Melbourne Phoenix | John Cain Arena, Melbourne |
| 20:00 | Scoring by quarter: 30–26, 16–28, 30–22, 27–17 |
| ESPN | Pts: Ili 18; Rebs: Loe 10; Asts: Dellavedova 6 | boxscore report | Pts: Ayre 15; Rebs: Hurt, Lewis 7 Asts: Foxwell 4 | Attendance: 10,175 |

== Ladder ==
| Pos | 2024–25 NBL season | | | | | | | | | | | |
| Pos | Team | Pld | W | L | PCT | Last 5 | Streak | Home | Away | PF | PA | PP |
|---|---|---|---|---|---|---|---|---|---|---|---|---|
| 1 | Illawarra Hawks | 29 | 20 | 9 | 68.97% | 4–1 | W3 | 10–4 | 10–5 | 2941 | 2645 | 111.19% |
| 2 | Melbourne United | 29 | 19 | 10 | 65.52% | 4–1 | W4 | 9–6 | 10–4 | 2771 | 2652 | 104.49% |
| 3 | Perth Wildcats | 29 | 18 | 11 | 62.07% | 3–2 | W3 | 10–5 | 8–6 | 2903 | 2811 | 103.27% |
| 4 | S.E. Melbourne Phoenix | 29 | 16 | 13 | 55.17% | 2–3 | L1 | 10–4 | 6–9 | 2787 | 2656 | 104.93% |
| 5 | Sydney Kings | 29 | 16 | 13 | 55.17% | 2–3 | L3 | 7–7 | 9–6 | 2630 | 2557 | 102.85% |
| 6 | Adelaide 36ers | 29 | 13 | 16 | 44.83% | 2–3 | L3 | 9–6 | 4–10 | 2736 | 2796 | 97.85% |
| 7 | Tasmania JackJumpers | 29 | 13 | 16 | 44.83% | 1–4 | W1 | 9–5 | 4–11 | 2435 | 2553 | 95.38% |
| 8 | Brisbane Bullets | 29 | 12 | 17 | 41.38% | 2–3 | L1 | 6–8 | 6–9 | 2678 | 2838 | 94.36% |
| 9 | New Zealand Breakers | 29 | 10 | 19 | 34.48% | 1–4 | L1 | 6–9 | 4–10 | 2485 | 2650 | 93.77% |
| 10 | Cairns Taipans | 29 | 8 | 21 | 27.59% | 3–2 | L1 | 4–11 | 4–10 | 2561 | 2769 | 92.49% |

Updated to match(es) played on 8 February 2025. Source: NBL.com.au

The NBL tie-breaker system as outlined in the NBL Rules and Regulations states that in the case of an identical win–loss record, the overall points percentage will determine order of seeding.

=== Ladder progression ===
| Leader and qualification to semifinals |
| Qualification to semifinals |
| Qualification to play-in |
| Last place |

2024–25 NBL season
| Team ╲ Round | 1 | 2 | 3 | 4 | 5 | 6 | 7 | 8 | 9 | 10 | 11 | 12 | 13 | 14 | 15 | 16 | 17 | 18 | 19 | 20 |
|---|---|---|---|---|---|---|---|---|---|---|---|---|---|---|---|---|---|---|---|---|
| Adelaide 36ers | 8 | 8 | 6 | 5 | 5 | 4 | 4 | 4 | 4 | 6 | 9 | 8 | 8 | 8 | 8 | 7 | 7 | 6 | 6 | 6 |
| Brisbane Bullets | 6 | 10 | 9 | 9 | 7 | 8 | 7 | 8 | 7 | 9 | 8 | 7 | 5 | 7 | 7 | 8 | 8 | 8 | 8 | 8 |
| Cairns Taipans | 10 | 7 | 4 | 6 | 6 | 9 | 10 | 10 | 10 | 10 | 10 | 10 | 10 | 10 | 10 | 10 | 10 | 10 | 10 | 10 |
| Illawarra Hawks | 1 | 1 | 2 | 2 | 1 | 1 | 2 | 3 | 3 | 2 | 2 | 1 | 1 | 1 | 1 | 1 | 1 | 1 | 1 | 1 |
| Melbourne United | 2 | 3 | 5 | 3 | 4 | 2 | 3 | 1 | 1 | 1 | 1 | 2 | 2 | 2 | 2 | 2 | 3 | 2 | 2 | 2 |
| New Zealand Breakers | 5 | 2 | 1 | 1 | 2 | 3 | 1 | 2 | 2 | 3 | 5 | 9 | 9 | 9 | 9 | 9 | 9 | 9 | 9 | 9 |
| Perth Wildcats | 4 | 5 | 8 | 7 | 8 | 6 | 6 | 6 | 6 | 5 | 4 | 4 | 6 | 5 | 4 | 3 | 4 | 5 | 3 | 3 |
| S.E. Melbourne Phoenix | 7 | 9 | 10 | 10 | 10 | 10 | 8 | 7 | 8 | 7 | 6 | 6 | 7 | 6 | 5 | 5 | 5 | 4 | 4 | 4 |
| Sydney Kings | 3 | 4 | 3 | 4 | 3 | 5 | 5 | 5 | 5 | 4 | 3 | 3 | 3 | 4 | 3 | 4 | 2 | 3 | 5 | 5 |
| Tasmania JackJumpers | 9 | 6 | 7 | 8 | 9 | 7 | 9 | 9 | 9 | 8 | 7 | 5 | 4 | 3 | 6 | 6 | 6 | 7 | 7 | 7 |

Updated to match(es) played on 8 February 2025. Source: NBL.com.au

== Finals ==
The 2025 NBL Finals was played in February and March 2025, consisting of three play-in games, two best-of-three semifinal series and the best-of-five NBL Championship series. In the semifinals, the higher seed hosts the first and third games. In the Championship Series, the higher seed hosts the first, third and fifth games.

The top two seeds in the regular season will automatically qualify to the semifinals. Teams ranked three to six will compete in the play-in tournament. The third seed will play the fourth seed for third spot and the loser will play the winner of fifth or sixth for the fourth seed.

=== Playoff Bracket ===
Play-in / Seeding qualifier
5 | Sydney Kings | 88
6 | Adelaide 36ers | 95
3 | Perth Wildcats | 122
4 | S.E. Melbourne Phoenix | 105

Play-in game
4 | S.E. Melbourne Phoenix | 85
6 | Adelaide 36ers | 75

Semifinals
1 | Illawarra Hawks | 101 | 94 | 126
4 | S.E. Melbourne Phoenix | 94 | 101 | 96
2 | Melbourne United | 105 | 89 | 113
3 | Perth Wildcats | 93 | 96 | 112

Championship
1 | Illawarra Hawks | 88 | 102 | 77 | 80 | 114
2 | Melbourne United | 96 | 100 | 83 | 71 | 104

== Awards ==
=== Pre-season ===
- Loggins-Bruton Cup: Brisbane Bullets
- Most Valuable Player (Ray Borner Medal): Tyrell Harrison (Brisbane Bullets)

=== Regular season ===
==== Awards Night ====
- Most Valuable Player (Andrew Gaze Trophy): Bryce Cotton (Perth Wildcats)
- Next Generation Award: Alex Toohey (Sydney Kings)
- Best Defensive Player (Damian Martin Trophy): Shea Ili (Melbourne United)
- Best Sixth Man: Kouat Noi (Sydney Kings)
- Most Improved Player: Tyrell Harrison (Brisbane Bullets)
- Fans MVP: Bryce Cotton (Perth Wildcats)
- Coach of the Year (Lindsay Gaze Trophy): Justin Tatum (Illawarra Hawks)
- Executive of the Year: Malcolm Watts (Brisbane Bullets)
- Referee of the Year: Vaughan Mayberry
- GameTime by Kmart: Majok Deng (Tasmania JackJumpers)
- Three-Pointer of the Year: Tyler Robertson (Sydney Kings)
- All-NBL First Team:
  - Bryce Cotton (Perth Wildcats)
  - Kendric Davis (Adelaide 36ers)
  - Matthew Hurt (S.E. Melbourne Phoenix)
  - Trey Kell (Illawarra Hawks)
  - Tyler Harvey (Illawarra Hawks)
- All-NBL Second Team:
  - Casey Prather (Brisbane Bullets)
  - Chris Goulding (Melbourne United)
  - Montrezl Harrell (Adelaide 36ers)
  - Sam Froling (Illawarra Hawks)
  - Xavier Cooks (Sydney Kings)

=== Postseason ===
- Championship Series MVP (Larry Sengstock Medal): Matthew Dellavedova (Melbourne United)
- NBL Champions: Illawarra Hawks (2nd title)

== NBL clubs in international competitions ==
| Team | Competition | Progress | Result | W–L |
|---|---|---|---|---|
| Tasmania JackJumpers | Intercontinental Cup | Group stage | Win vs. (Argentine Basketball Confederation) Quimsa | 2–1 |
| Tasmania JackJumpers | Intercontinental Cup | Group stage | Loss vs. (USA Basketball) NBA G League United | 2–1 |
| Tasmania JackJumpers | Intercontinental Cup | Third place | Win vs. (Lebanese Basketball Federation) Al Riyadi | 2–1 |

- As reigning NBL champions, the JackJumpers competed in the 2024 FIBA Intercontinental Cup, becoming the first team from Oceania to play in the FIBA Intercontinental Cup. Tasmania finished third, after defeating Al Riyadi from Lebanon in the third place game.
