= Basketball at the 2026 Asian Games – Men's tournament =

Men's basketball at the 2026 Asian Games
- Venues: Aichi International Arena
- Dates: 10–20 September 2026
- Competitors: 144 from 12 nations

Medalists
| gold medal | South Korea |
| silver medal | Japan |
| bronze medal | Iran |

The men's 5-on-5 basketball tournament at the 2026 Asian Games was held in Kita-ku, Nagoya, Aichi Prefecture, Japan from 10 to 20 September 2026.

== Schedule ==
The schedule of the tournament is as follows.

| G | Group phase | ¼ | Quarterfinals | ½ | Semifinals | B | Bronze medal match | F | Gold medal match |

| 10th Thu | 11th Fri | 12th Sat | 13th Sun | 14th Mon | 15th Tue | 16th Wed | 17th Thu | 18th Fri | 19th Sat | 20th Sun | |
|---|---|---|---|---|---|---|---|---|---|---|---|
| G | G | G | G | G | | ¼ | | ½ | | B | F |

== Draw ==
The participating teams and matchups for the basketball competition were announced on 7 August 2026.

Group A
| Pos | Team |
|---|---|
| A1 | Japan |
| A2 | South Korea |
| A3 | Saudi Arabia |
| A4 | Indonesia |

Group B
| Pos | Team |
|---|---|
| B1 | Iran |
| B2 | Jordan |
| B3 | Chinese Taipei |
| B4 | Qatar |

Group C
| Pos | Team |
|---|---|
| C1 | China |
| C2 | Philippines |
| C3 | Bahrain |
| C4 | Kazakhstan |

== Squad ==
| Bahrain | China | Chinese Taipei | Indonesia |
|---|---|---|---|
| Mohamed Buallay; Elijah Thomas; Ahmed Haji; Ahmed Al-Derazi; Ali Rashed; Kelechi Ajukwa; Uroš Ilić; Ali Al-Haddad; JaKarr Sampson; Mohamed Juma; Mustafa Rashed; Ahmed Bindayneh | Hu Mingxuan; Liao Sanning; Pang Zhenglin; Wang Junjie; Yu Jiahao; Li Hongquan; Jiao Boqiao; Zhao Jiayi; Hu Jinqiu; Cui Yongxi; Zhu Junlong; Li Yuezhou | Lin Ting-chien; Ma Chien-hao; Yu Ai-che; Chen Ying-chun; Hu Long-mao; Li Chia-kang; Samuel Manu; Brandon Gilbeck; Lu Chun-hsiang; Jonah Morrison; Chen Kuan-chuan; Tseng Hsiang-chun | Derrick Michael Xzavierro; Abraham Damar Grahita; Ali Bagir; Andakara Prastawa; Yudha Saputera; Vincent Rivaldi Kosasih; Hendrick Xavi Yonga; Lester Prosper; Dame Diagne; Pandu Wiguna; Fhirdan Guntara; Anthony Beane |
| Iran | Japan | Jordan | Kazakhstan |
| Piter Girgoorian; Alireza Sharifi; Mobin Sheikhi; Navid Rezaeifar; Khashayar Aliakbarinamghi; Mohammad Heydari; Arman Zangeneh; Mohammad Jamshidi; Arsalan Kazemi; Matin Aghajanpour; Salar Monji; Mahdi Jafari | Kotetsu Kurokawa; John Harper Jr.; Ren Kanechika; Toyoshige Kano; Ibu Yamazaki; Yuto Kawashima; Kazuma Tsuya; Atsuya Ogawa; Avi Schafer; Jaheru Yamauchi; Alex Kirk; Shinji Takashima | Abdullah Olajuwon; Amin Abu Hawwas; Dar Tucker; Freddy Ibrahim; Perrin Buford; Ahmad Al-Hamarsheh; Rawhi Kilani; Yazan Al-Taweel; Yousef Abu Wazaneh; Mohammad Hussein; Malek Kanaan; Ahmad Al-Dwairi | Abat Marat; Shaim Kuanov; Nikita Fedchenko; Vladimir Ivanov; Rustam Murzagaliyev; Anton Bykov; Konstantin Neff; Roman Marchuk; Daniil Severgin; Bogdan Rabchenyuk; Stanislav Sakhipov; Askar Maydekin |
| Philippines | Qatar | Saudi Arabia | South Korea |
| Adrian Nocum; Sedrick Barefield; RJ Abarrientos; Don Trollano; Jerrick Ahanmisi; Robert Bolick; Calvin Oftana; Brandon Bates; Justine Baltazar; Justin Arana; Zavier Lucero; Brandon Ganuelas-Rosser | Moustafa Fouda; Mike Lewis II; Mahmoud Darwish; Abdulrahman Saad; Seydou Ndoye; Abdulla Mousa; Mohammed Abbasher; Ousmanediatta Dieng; Abdelrahman Abdelhaleem; Dejan Janjić; Aladji Magassa; Oussama Arfa | Osama Al-Bargawi; Marzouq Al-Muwallad; Muhammad-Ali Abdur-Rahkman; Mathna Al-Marwani; Mohammed Al-Sager; Khalid Abdel Gabar; Mohammed Al-Suwailem; Ahmed Al-Mukhtar; Ali Shubayli; Thamer Mohammed; Mohammed Al-Khater; Hammam Hussain | Lee Hyun-jung; Choi Jun-yong; Byeon Jun-hyeong; Lee Jung-hyun; Yu Ki-sang; Lee Woo-suk; Moon Jeong-hyeon; Yeo Jun-seok; Moon Yu-hyeon; Jang Jae-seok; Lee Seoung-hyun; Daniel Edi |

== Group phase ==
All times are local, Japan Standard Time (UTC+9).

=== Group A ===
| Pos | Team | Pld | W | L | PF | PA | PD | Pts | Qualification |
|---|---|---|---|---|---|---|---|---|---|
| 1 | South Korea | 3 | 3 | 0 | 284 | 197 | +87 | 6 | Quarterfinals |
| 2 | Japan (H) | 3 | 2 | 1 | 267 | 233 | +34 | 5 | Quarterfinals |
| 3 | Saudi Arabia | 3 | 1 | 2 | 246 | 257 | −11 | 4 | Quarterfinals |
| 4 | Indonesia | 3 | 0 | 3 | 190 | 300 | −110 | 3 | |

Source: AsianGames2026.org
(H) Hosts

10 September 2026
16:00

Report
Box score

| South Korea | 82–66 | Saudi Arabia |
Scoring by quarter: 24–17, 17–11, 33–19, 8–19
| Pts: Lee H. 23; Rebs: Lee J. 7 Asts: Byeon, Lee J. 4 | | Pts: Al-Muwallad 18; Rebs: Al-Marwani, Al-Suwailem 9 Asts: Al-Marwani 5 |

Aichi International Arena, Nagoya
Referees: Wissam Zein (SYR), Chuang Chih-chun (TPE), Hu Jing (CHN)

10 September 2026
19:00

Report
Box score

| Japan | 98–53 | Indonesia |
Scoring by quarter: 29–9, 26–12, 20–14, 23–18
| Pts: Tsuya 23; Rebs: Kawashima 9 Asts: Kurokawa 10 | | Pts: Prosper 13; Rebs: Xzavierro 5 Asts: Beane, Saputera 3 |

Aichi International Arena, Nagoya
Referees: Yuen Chun Yip (HKG), Mohammad Taha (JOR), Rakesh Ramalingaiah (IND)

11 September 2026
16:00

Report
Box score

| Indonesia | 48–102 | South Korea |
Scoring by quarter: 10–18, 20–21, 11–31, 7–32
| Pts: Saputera 17; Rebs: Xzavierro 11; Asts: Beane 3 | | Pts: Lee H. 24; Rebs: Lee H. 10; Asts: Moon Y. 8 |

Aichi International Arena, Nagoya
Attendance: 5,154
Referees: Chuang Chih-chun (TPE), Rakesh Ramalingaiah (IND), Mandy Ngieng (MAS)

11 September 2026
19:00

Report
Box score

| Saudi Arabia | 80–86 | Japan |
Scoring by quarter: 15–25, 20–26, 20–17, 25–18
| Pts: Abdur-Rahkman 29; Rebs: Al-Suwailem 12; Asts: Al-Marwani 5 | | Pts: Kirk 23; Rebs: Kirk 10; Asts: Kurokawa 8 |

Aichi International Arena, Nagoya
Attendance: 9,177
Referees: Glenn Cornelio (PHI), Yuen Chun Yip (HKG), Nattapong Jontapa (THA)

13 September 2026
16:00

Report
Box score

| Saudi Arabia | 100–89 | Indonesia |
Scoring by quarter: 21–21, 29–20, 20–14, 30–34
| Pts: Abdur-Rahkman 41; Rebs: Al-Suwailem 13; Asts: Abdel Gabar 7 | | Pts: Grahita 22; Rebs: Kosasih 12; Asts: Saputera 8 |

Aichi International Arena, Nagoya
Attendance: 8,435
Referees: Chuang Chih-Chun (TPE), Hu Jing (CHN), Rakesh Ramalingaiah (IND)

13 September 2026
19:00

Report
Box score

| Japan | 83–100 | South Korea |
Scoring by quarter: 17–19, 25–21, 24–31, 17–29
| Pts: Kurokawa 21; Rebs: Kirk 12; Asts: Harper 6 | | Pts: Lee J. 25; Rebs: Jang 8 Asts: Lee H., Lee J. 7 |

Aichi International Arena, Nagoya
Attendance: 8,182
Referees: Nattapong Jontapa (THA), Mohammad Taha (JOR), Mandy Ngieng (MAS)

=== Group B ===
| Pos | Team | Pld | W | L | PF | PA | PD | Pts | Qualification |
|---|---|---|---|---|---|---|---|---|---|
| 1 | Iran | 3 | 2 | 1 | 206 | 196 | +10 | 5 (Note: Iran 1–0 Chinese Taipei) | Quarterfinals |
| 2 | Chinese Taipei | 3 | 2 | 1 | 243 | 221 | +22 | 5 | Quarterfinals |
| 3 | Jordan | 3 | 1 | 2 | 224 | 229 | −5 | 4 (Note: Jordan 1–0 Qatar) | Quarterfinals |
| 4 | Qatar | 3 | 1 | 2 | 193 | 220 | −27 | 4 | |

Source: AsianGames2026.org
Notes:

10 September 2026
10:00

Report
Box score

| Iran | 53–59 | Qatar |
Scoring by quarter: 10–10, 11–21, 13–13, 19–15
| Pts: Aghajanpour 15; Rebs: Kazemi, Zangeneh 7 Asts: three players 3 | | Pts: Lewis 21; Rebs: Janjić 9 Asts: Janjić, Saad 3 |

Aichi International Arena, Nagoya
Referees: Rabah Noujaim (LBN), Nattapong Jontapa (THA), Shigeyuki Arisawa (JPN)

10 September 2026
13:00

Report
Box score

| Jordan | 80–83 | Chinese Taipei |
Scoring by quarter: 13–17, 23–29, 19–14, 25–23
| Pts: Buford, Olajuwon 18; Rebs: Buford, Tucker 8 Asts: Ibrahim 6 | | Pts: Chen Y. 16; Rebs: Gilbeck 9 Asts: Chen Y. 5 |

Aichi International Arena, Nagoya
Referees: Glenn Cornelio (PHI), Lee Ji-youn (KOR), Abdullah Al-Hejaili (KSA)

12 September 2026
10:00

Report
Box score

| Chinese Taipei | 69–72 | Iran |
Scoring by quarter: 17–13, 10–15, 23–21, 19–23
| Pts: Chen Y. 29; Rebs: Gilbeck 7 Asts: Yu 10 | | Pts: Jamshidi 18; Rebs: Zangeneh 7 Asts: Jafari 5 |

Aichi International Arena, Nagoya
Attendance: 8,555
Referees: Glenn Cornelio (PHI), Rakesh Ramalingaiah (IND), Yana Nikogossyan (KAZ)

12 September 2026
13:00

Report
Box score

| Qatar | 65–76 | Jordan |
Scoring by quarter: 14–19, 16–23, 19–22, 16–12
| Pts: Lewis 14; Rebs: Saad 6 Asts: Lewis 4 | | Pts: Buford 20; Rebs: Hussein 9 Asts: three players 5 |

Aichi International Arena, Nagoya
Attendance: 8,132
Referees: Rabah Noujaim (LIB), Yuen Chun Yip (HKG), Budi Marfan (INA)

13 September 2026
10:00

Report
Box score

| Iran | 81–68 | Jordan |
Scoring by quarter: 19–20, 17–16, 27–16, 18–16
| Pts: Jamshidi 30; Rebs: Kazemi, Sharifi 8 Asts: Jafari 6 | | Pts: Tucker 19; Rebs: Buford 8 Asts: Ibrahim 7 |

Aichi International Arena, Nagoya
Attendance: 8,202
Referees: Rabah Noujaim (LBN), Yuen Chun Yip (HKG), Glenn Cornelio (PHI)

13 September 2026
13:00

Report
Box score

| Chinese Taipei | 91–69 | Qatar |
Scoring by quarter: 26–12, 20–15, 22–18, 23–24
| Pts: Lin 21; Rebs: Gilbeck 9 Asts: Chen Y. 9 | | Pts: Janjić 15; Rebs: Arfa, Janjić 9 Asts: Saad 4 |

Aichi International Arena, Nagoya
Attendance: 8,355
Referees: Wissam Zein (SYR) , Shigeyuki Arisawa (JPN), Lee Ji-youn (KOR)

=== Group C ===
| Pos | Team | Pld | W | L | PF | PA | PD | Pts | Qualification |
|---|---|---|---|---|---|---|---|---|---|
| 1 | China | 3 | 3 | 0 | 309 | 181 | +128 | 6 | Quarterfinals |
| 2 | Bahrain | 3 | 2 | 1 | 249 | 268 | −19 | 5 | Quarterfinals |
| 3 | Philippines | 3 | 1 | 2 | 255 | 272 | −17 | 4 | |
| 4 | Kazakhstan | 3 | 0 | 3 | 217 | 309 | −92 | 3 | |

Source: AsianGames2026.org

11 September 2026
10:00

Report
Box score

| China | 99–61 | Kazakhstan |
Scoring by quarter: 31–12, 27–19, 21–13, 20–17
| Pts: Pang, Yu 17; Rebs: Li H. 9 Asts: Liao 9 | | Pts: Maydekin 11; Rebs: Ivanov 7 Asts: Murzagaliyev 4 |

Aichi International Arena, Nagoya
Referees: Wissam Zein (SYR), Abdullah Al-Hejaili (KSA), Ami Takano (JPN)

11 September 2026
13:00

Report
Box score

| Philippines | 85–89 | Bahrain |
Scoring by quarter: 21–29, 22–20, 18–27, 24–13
| Pts: Oftana 31; Rebs: Lucero 9 Asts: Lucero, Nocum 5 | | Pts: Sampson 24; Rebs: Sampson 13; Asts: Sampson 8 |

Aichi International Arena, Nagoya
Attendance: 7,557
Referees: Rabah Noujaim (LBN), Mohammad Taha (JOR), Lee Ji-youn (KOR)

12 September 2026
16:00

Report
Box score

| Bahrain | 59–105 | China |
Scoring by quarter: 11–32, 18–14, 13–25, 17–34
| Pts: Sampson 17; Rebs: Sampson 5 Asts: Al-Derazi, Sampson 3 | | Pts: Liao 23; Rebs: Jiao, Yu 6 Asts: Pang 7 |

Aichi International Arena, Nagoya
Attendance: 8,181
Referees: Wissam Zein (SYR), Shigeyui Arisawa (JPN), Nattapong Jontapa (THA)

12 September 2026
19:00

Report
Box score

| Kazakhstan | 78–109 | Philippines |
Scoring by quarter: 15–18, 22–32, 29–32, 12–27
| Pts: Bykov 15; Rebs: Bykov 10; Asts: Fedchenko, Rabchenyuk 5 | | Pts: Ahanmisi 22; Rebs: Bates, Lucero 9 Asts: Barefield 5 |

Aichi International Arena, Nagoya
Attendance: 8,026
Referees: Mohammad Taha (JOR), Chuang Chih-chun (TPE), Abdullah Al-Hejaili (KSA)

14 September 2026
10:00

Report
Box score

| Bahrain | 101–78 | Kazakhstan |
Scoring by quarter: 28–15, 27–24, 22–17, 24–22
| Pts: Sampson 23; Rebs: Sampson 9 Asts: M. Rashed 8 | | Pts: Severgin 16; Rebs: Bykov 10; Asts: Neff 6 |

Aichi International Arena, Nagoya
Attendance: 6,360
Referees: Mohammad Tama (JOR), Shigeyuki Arisawa (JPN), Abdullah Al-Hejaili (KSA)

14 September 2026
13:00

Report
Box score

| China | 105–61 | Philippines |
Scoring by quarter: 36–16, 30–14, 13–10, 26–21
| Pts: Wang 20; Rebs: Wang 14; Asts: four players 4 | | Pts: Oftana 13; Rebs: Lucero 6 Asts: Barefield, Bolick 4 |

Aichi International Arena, Nagoya
Attendance: 4,307
Referees: Rabah Noujaim (LBN), Wissam Zein (SYR), Nattapong Jontapa (THA)

=== Ranking of third-place teams ===
| Pos | Grp | Team | Pld | W | L | PF | PA | PD | Pts | Qualification |
|---|---|---|---|---|---|---|---|---|---|---|
| 1 | B | Jordan | 3 | 1 | 2 | 224 | 229 | −5 | 4 | Quarterfinals |
| 2 | A | Saudi Arabia | 3 | 1 | 2 | 246 | 257 | −11 | 4 | Quarterfinals |
| 3 | C | Philippines | 3 | 1 | 2 | 255 | 272 | −17 | 4 | |

Source: AsianGames2026.org

== Knockout stage ==
The record of each team will be compared to the records of other groups' teams that have the same group ranking as theirs. All teams will be ranked 1 to 12, with the first-placed teams from each group being 1–3, the second-place teams being 4–6, the third-place teams being 7–9, and the last-placed teams being 10–12. Only the top 8 teams qualify for the knockout stage. The top two teams (1 and 2) will play against one of the two best third-placed teams (7 and 8). The remaining matchups between ranks 3/4 and ranks 5/6 will be determined by a draw. Teams from the same group cannot play one another in the quarterfinals.

All times are local, Japan Standard Time (UTC+9).

=== Ranking ===
| Pos | Grp | Team | Pld | W | L | PF | PA | PD | Pts | Qualification |
|---|---|---|---|---|---|---|---|---|---|---|
| 1 | C1 | China | 3 | 3 | 0 | 309 | 181 | +128 | 6 | Seeded (No draw) |
| 2 | A1 | South Korea | 3 | 3 | 0 | 284 | 197 | +87 | 6 | Seeded (No draw) |
| 3 | B1 | Iran | 3 | 2 | 1 | 206 | 196 | +10 | 5 | Seeded (Draw) |
| 4 | A2 | Japan | 3 | 2 | 1 | 267 | 233 | +34 | 5 | Seeded (Draw) |
| 5 | B2 | Chinese Taipei | 3 | 2 | 1 | 243 | 221 | +22 | 5 | Unseeded (Draw) |
| 6 | C2 | Bahrain | 3 | 2 | 1 | 249 | 268 | −19 | 5 | Unseeded (Draw) |
| 7 | B3 | Jordan | 3 | 1 | 2 | 224 | 229 | −5 | 4 | Unseeded (No draw) |
| 8 | A3 | Saudi Arabia | 3 | 1 | 2 | 246 | 257 | −11 | 4 | Unseeded (No draw) |

Source: AsianGames2026.org
Rules for classification: 1) points; 2) points difference; 3) points scored.

=== Bracket ===
Quarterfinals
16 September
Chinese Taipei | 78
Japan | 85
16 September
China | 87
Saudi Arabia | 78
16 September
Jordan | 80
South Korea | 114
16 September
Iran | 79
Bahrain | 74

Semifinals
18 September
Japan | 97
China | 77
18 September
South Korea | 77
Iran | 51

Gold medal
20 September
Japan | 57
South Korea | 67
Bronze medal
20 September
China | 70
Iran | 79

=== Quarterfinals ===
16 September 2026
10:00

Report
Box score

| Jordan | 80–114 | South Korea |
Scoring by quarter: 8–28, 19–23, 24–34, 29–29
| Pts: Tucker 22; Rebs: Hussein 4 Asts: Ibrahim 6 | | Pts: Lee H. 28; Rebs: Lee H., Lee W. 9 Asts: Lee J. 6 |

Aichi International Arena, Nagoya
Attendance: 7,904
Referees: Yuen Chun Yip (HKG), Chuang Chih-chun (TPE), Abdullah Al-Hejaili (KSA)

16 September 2026
13:00

Report
Box score

| Iran | 79–74 | Bahrain |
Scoring by quarter: 21–17, 22–17, 17–21, 19–19
| Pts: Jamshidi 20; Rebs: Kazemi 11; Asts: Kazemi 10 | | Pts: M. Rashed 26; Rebs: Thomas 10; Asts: M. Rashed 12 |

Aichi International Arena, Nagoya
Attendance: 7,731
Referees: Rabah Noujaim (LBN), Shigeyuki Arisawa (JPN), Rakesh Ramalingaiah (IND)

16 September 2026
16:00

Report
Box score

| China | 87–78 | Saudi Arabia |
Scoring by quarter: 27–24, 21–15, 14–23, 25–16
| Pts: Liao 30; Rebs: Cui, Yu 9 Asts: Liao 4 | | Pts: Abdur-Rahkman 25; Rebs: Al-Suwailem 10; Asts: three players 4 |

Aichi International Arena, Nagoya
Attendance: 5,504
Referees: Mohammad Taha (JOR), Nattapong Jontapa (THA), Lee Ji-youn (KOR)

16 September 2026
19:20

Report
Box score

| Chinese Taipei | 78–85 | Japan |
Scoring by quarter: 9–16, 23–28, 17–24, 29–17
| Pts: Chen Y. 20; Rebs: Gilbeck 10; Asts: Gilbeck, Manu 4 | | Pts: Kurokawa 23; Rebs: Kirk 8 Asts: Ogawa 7 |

Aichi International Arena, Nagoya
Attendance: 5,504
Referees: Wissam Zein (SYR), Budi Marfan (INA), Glenn Cornelio (PHI)

=== Semifinals ===
18 September 2026
16:00

Report
Box score

| South Korea | 77–51 | Iran |
Scoring by quarter: 12–8, 24–16, 25–13, 16–14
| Pts: Lee H. 26; Rebs: Lee H. 14; Asts: Lee H. 4 | | Pts: Jamshidi 12; Rebs: Kazemi 11; Asts: Heydari, Kazemi 3 |

Aichi International Arena, Nagoya
Attendance: 5,758
Referees: Wissam Zein (SYR), Chuang Chih-chun (TPE), Glenn Cornelio (PHI)

18 September 2026
19:20

Report
Box score

| Japan | 97–77 | China |
Scoring by quarter: 28–15, 21–15, 34–22, 14–25
| Pts: Kanechika 19; Rebs: Kirk 12; Asts: Ogawa 9 | | Pts: Hu J. 16; Rebs: Li H. 13; Asts: Liao 6 |

Aichi International Arena, Nagoya
Attendance: 5,758
Referees: Rabah Noujaim (LBN), Nattapong Jontapa (THA), Budi Marfan (INA)

=== Bronze medal game ===
20 September 2026
16:40

Report
Box score

| China | 70–79 | Iran |
Scoring by quarter: 17–12, 14–17, 15–26, 24–24
| Pts: Pang 22; Rebs: Jiao, Wang 7 Asts: Liao 6 | | Pts: Aghajanpour 21; Rebs: Kazemi 15; Asts: Kazemi 6 |

Aichi International Arena, Nagoya
Attendance: 7,360
Referees: Shigeyuki Arisawa (JPN), Mohammad Taha (JOR), Abdullah Al-Hejaili (KSA)

=== Gold medal game ===
20 September 2026
19:40

Report
Box score

| Japan | 57–67 | South Korea |
Scoring by quarter: 16–12, 12–16, 19–27, 10–12
| Pts: Kanechika 13; Rebs: Kirk 8 Asts: Kirk, Kurokawa 3 | | Pts: Lee H. 27; Rebs: Lee H. 18; Asts: Lee J. 7 |

Aichi International Arena, Nagoya
Attendance: 7,360
Referees: Rabah Noujaim (LBN), Yuen Chun Yip (HKG), Nattapong Jontapa (THA)

== Final standing ==
| Rank | Team | Pld | W | L |
|---|---|---|---|---|
| 1st place, gold medalist(s) | South Korea | 6 | 6 | 0 |
| 2nd place, silver medalist(s) | Japan | 6 | 4 | 2 |
| 3rd place, bronze medalist(s) | Iran | 6 | 4 | 2 |
| 4 | China | 6 | 4 | 2 |
| 5 | Chinese Taipei | 4 | 2 | 2 |
| 6 | Bahrain | 4 | 2 | 2 |
| 7 | Jordan | 4 | 1 | 3 |
| 8 | Saudi Arabia | 4 | 1 | 3 |
| 9 | Philippines | 3 | 1 | 2 |
| 10 | Qatar | 3 | 1 | 2 |
| 11 | Kazakhstan | 3 | 0 | 3 |
| 12 | Indonesia | 3 | 0 | 3 |
