= Daisuke Kobayashi =

Daisuke Kobayashi may refer to:

- Daisuke Kobayashi (basketball)
- Daisuke Kobayashi (footballer)
