= Brandon Ashley =

American basketball player (born 1994)

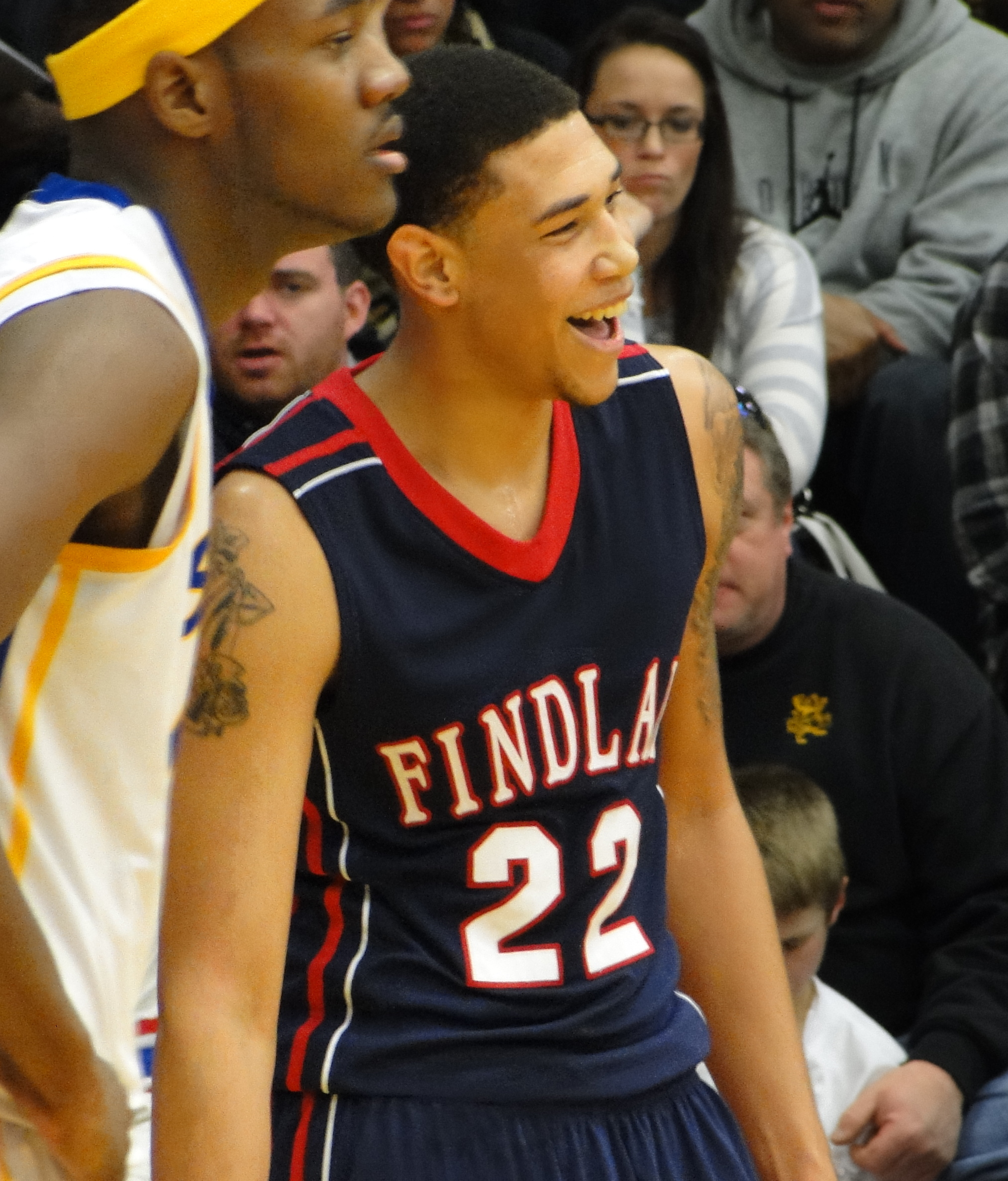
- Ashley in January 2011

Free agent
- Position: Power forward

Personal information
- Born: July 15, 1994 (age 32) San Francisco, California, U.S.
- Listed height: 206 cm (6 ft 9 in)
- Listed weight: 104 kg (229 lb)

Career information
- High school: Bishop O'Dowd (Oakland, California); Findlay Prep (Henderson, Nevada)
- College: Arizona (2012–2015)
- NBA draft: 2015: undrafted
- Playing career: 2015–present

Career history
- 2015–2016: Texas Legends
- 2016: Alba Berlin
- 2017–2018: Texas Legends
- 2019: Cytavision Apoel Nicosia
- 2019–2020: New Zealand Breakers
- 2020: Indios de Mayagüez
- 2021: NBA G League Ignite
- 2021: Fortitudo Bologna
- 2022: South East Melbourne Phoenix
- 2022–2025: Altiri Chiba

Career highlights
- NBA D-League All-Star (2016); Pac-12 tournament MVP (2015); McDonald's All-American (2012); First-team Parade All-American (2012)
- Stats at Basketball Reference

Brandon Damon Allen Ashley (born July 15, 1994) is an American professional basketball player who last played for the Altiri Chiba of the Japanese B.League. He played college basketball for the University of Arizona.

== High school career ==
Ashley attended Bishop O'Dowd High School in Oakland, California, before transferring to Findlay Prep in Henderson, Nevada, for his senior season. He averaged 15.3 points and 6.8 rebounds per game as a senior, and led Findlay to a 32–1 record and an ESPN NHSI national title.

Considered a five-star recruit by ESPN.com, Ashley was listed as the No. 3 power forward and the No. 16 player in the nation in 2012.

== College career ==
During the 2013–14 season, Ashley helped lead the Wildcats to a 21–0 record to start the season before injuring his foot, sidelining him for the rest of the season. The season resulted in an Elite 8 appearance. He was subsequently featured on the cover of Sports Illustrated in November 2014.

As a junior in 2014–15, Ashley was named Most Outstanding player of the Pac-12 tournament. He averaged 12.2 points and 5.2 rebounds per game in helping Arizona return to the Elite Eight for the second straight year.

On April 8, 2015, Ashley announced his decision to forgo his senior season and enter the NBA draft.

=== College statistics ===
Year	Team	GP	GS	MPG	FG%	3P%	FT%	RPG	APG	SPG	BPG	PPG
2012–13	Arizona	35	21	20.5	.525	1.000	.735	5.3	.7	.5	.5	7.5
2013–14	Arizona	22	22	27.7	.522	.379	.757	5.8	1.0	.6	.7	11.5
2014–15	Arizona	38	38	27.8	.514	.333	.703	5.2	.7	.6	.7	12.2
Career		95	81	25.1	.519	.382	.724	5.4	.7	.6	.6	10.3

== Professional career ==
After going undrafted in the 2015 NBA draft, Ashley played for the Atlanta Hawks during the NBA Summer League and spent preseason with the Dallas Mavericks. He spent the first half of the 2015–16 season with the Texas Legends in the NBA Development League, earning West All-Star team honors for the NBA D-League All-Star Game. He finished the season in Germany with Alba Berlin.

In July 2016, Ashley played for the Dallas Mavericks and Atlanta Hawks during the NBA Summer League. A year later, after sitting out the 2016–17 season, he again played for the Mavericks during the NBA Summer League. After another preseason stint with the Mavericks, he spent the 2017–18 season with the Texas Legends.

In February 2019, Ashley moved to Cyprus to play for Cytavision Apoel Nicosia. In nine games, he averaged 11.8 points and 6.9 rebounds per game.

After playing for the Sacramento Kings during the 2019 NBA Summer League, Ashley signed with the New Zealand Breakers of the Australian National Basketball League (NBL) on September 29, 2019. He averaged 10.9 points and 6.4 rebounds per game during the 2019–20 NBL season.

Between February 29 and March 10, 2020, Ashley played four games in Puerto Rico for Indios de Mayagüez.

Ashley played for the NBA G League Ignite in the G League hub season between February and March 2021.

In August 2021, Ashley returned to Europe, signing with Fortitudo Bologna of the Italian Lega Basket Serie A. He left Fortitudo in November 2021.

On January 11, 2022, Ashley signed with the South East Melbourne Phoenix of the Australian NBL, returning to league for a second stint.
