= Biwali Bayles =

Australian basketball player (born 2002)

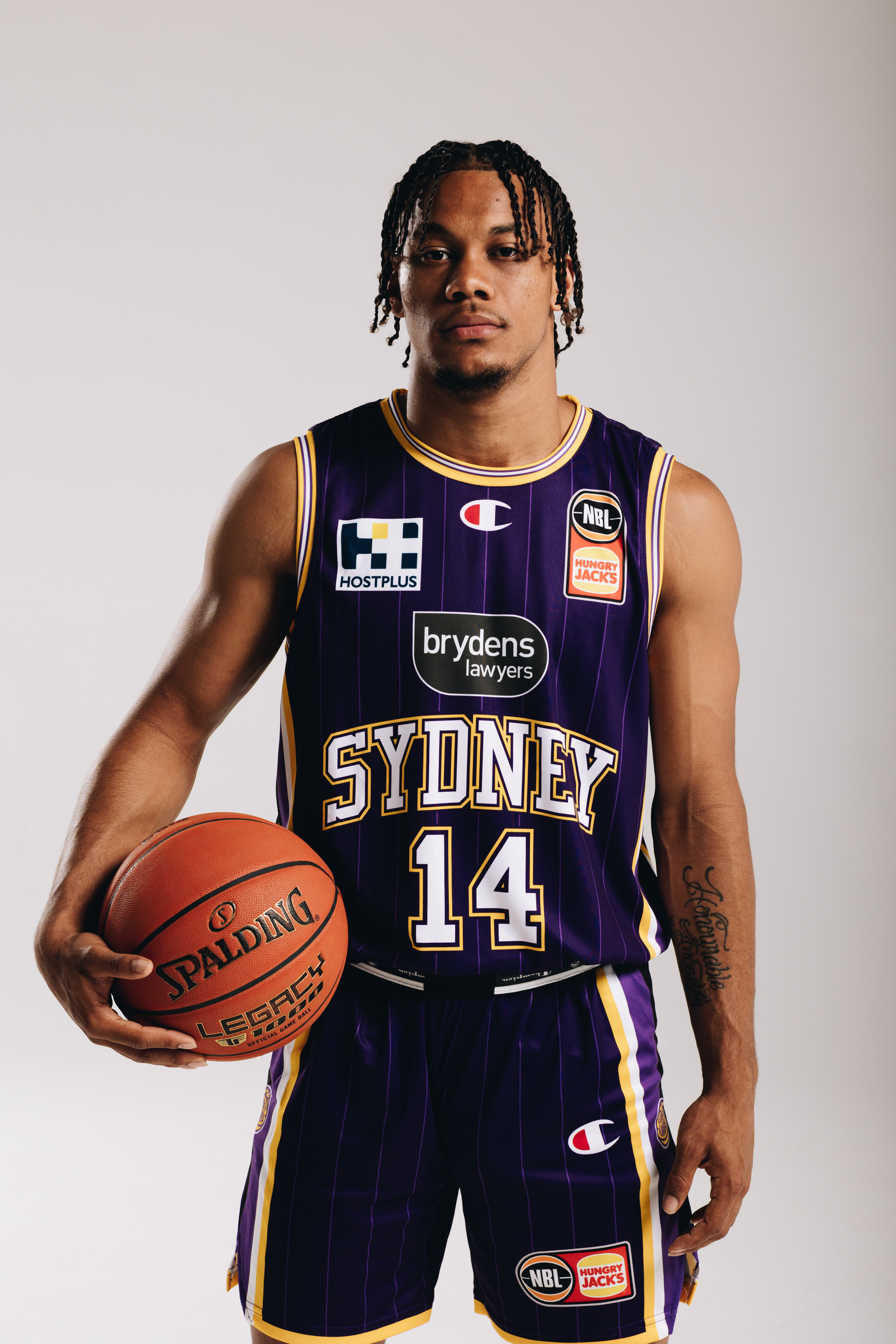
- Bayles with the Sydney Kings in 2021

Free agent
- Position: Point guard / shooting guard

Personal information
- Born: 15 February 2002 (age 24) Brisbane, Queensland, Australia
- Listed height: 185 cm (6 ft 1 in)
- Listed weight: 84 kg (185 lb)

Career information
- High school: Alexandria Park (Sydney, New South Wales)
- College: Hawaii (2020–2021)
- NBA draft: 2022: undrafted
- Playing career: 2020–present

Career history
- 2020: BA Centre of Excellence
- 2021: Inner West Bulls
- 2021–2023: Sydney Kings
- 2022: Mackay Meteors
- 2023: North Gold Coast Seahawks
- 2023–2024: Illawarra Hawks
- 2024–2025: Sydney Comets
- 2024–2025: BBC Nyon
- 2025–2026: Illawarra Hawks
- 2026: Bendigo Braves
- 2026: Tasmania JackJumpers

Career highlights
- 2× NBL champion (2022, 2023); All-NBL1 South Second Team (2026); Swiss League All-Domestic Team (2025)
Medals
Men's basketball
Representing Australia
FIBA U17 Oceania Championship
Gold medal – first place	2019 Nouméa	Team

Biwali Bayles (born 15 February 2002) is an Australian professional basketball player who last played for the Tasmania JackJumpers of the National Basketball League (NBL). He won two NBL championships with the Sydney Kings in 2022 and 2023. He played college basketball for Hawaii.

== Early life ==
Biwali Bayles was born on 15 February 2002 in Brisbane. He moved to the Sydney suburb of Redfern with his family when he was one or two years old, and grew up in The Block, which is home to him. He was a big fan of Brisbane Broncos player Jharal Yow Yeh, and at one point wanted to make a career out of rugby league football, until his mother suggested giving basketball a try.

== College career ==
Bayles committed to playing college basketball at Hawaii in January 2020.

He led the team in assists per game (2.6) in his lone season with the program, while also averaging 6.2 points per game. He also hit a three-point shot against Cal State Northridge that would prove to be the game-winning shot for Hawaii.

Bayles left the program in March 2021 to turn professional and play in Australia.

== Professional career ==
=== NBL and Europe ===
Bayles signed with the Sydney Kings on 27 April 2021. He helped the Kings win the 2022 NBL championship.

On 14 January 2023, it was announced that Bayles would be taking paid leave of absence from Kings for the rest of the 2022–23 season. The Kings went on to win the 2023 NBL championship.

On 25 May 2023, Bayles signed with the Illawarra Hawks as a development player for the 2023–24 NBL season.

In August 2024, Bayles signed with BBC Nyon of the Swiss Basketball League. He earned All-Domestic Team honours.

On 15 September 2025, Bayles signed a two-year deal with the Illawarra Hawks, returning to the team for a second stint. Following the 2025–26 NBL season, he became a free agent and was not retained for a second season.

On 30 September 2026, Bayles signed with the Tasmania JackJumpers as an injury replacement for Ben Ayre. Bayles was released by the JackJumpers on 18 November after appearing in eight games to allow him to pursue overseas opportunities.

=== NBL1 and NBA Summer League ===
In 2020, Bayles had a two-game stint with the BA Centre of Excellence in the Waratah League. In 2021, he had a two-game stint with the Inner West Bulls, also in the Waratah League.

Bayles played for the Mackay Meteors of the NBL1 North during the 2022 NBL1 season. He continued in the NBL1 North in the 2023 season with the North Gold Coast Seahawks before joining the Sydney Comets of the NBL1 East for the 2024 season. He re-joined the Comets for the 2025 NBL1 East season.

In June 2025, Bayles played for the Indigenous Basketball Australia All-Stars team in an exhibition match against Maori Basketball New Zealand. In July 2025, he played for the New York Knicks in the NBA Summer League.

Bayles joined the Bendigo Braves of the NBL1 South for the 2026 season. For the season, he was named All-NBL1 South Second Team and averaged 25.4 points, 6.9 rebounds, 7 assists and 1.9 steals per game. In July 2026, he played for the Indigenous Basketball Australia All-Stars team in an exhibition match against Maori Basketball New Zealand, where he recorded 14 points, 11 rebounds and six assists in a 106–88 win.

== National team career ==
Bayles won a gold medal at the FIBA U17 Oceania Championships in 2019 playing for the Australia national under-17 team. He has also been a member of the Australia national under-19 team, playing for them at the 2021 FIBA U19 World Cup.

== Career statistics ==
Legend
GP	Games played	GS	Games started	MPG	Minutes per game
FG%	Field goal percentage	3P%	3-point field goal percentage	FT%	Free throw percentage
RPG	Rebounds per game	APG	Assists per game	SPG	Steals per game
BPG	Blocks per game	PPG	Points per game	**Bold**	Career high

=== College ===
Year	Team	GP	GS	MPG	FG%	3P%	FT%	RPG	APG	SPG	BPG	PPG
2020–21	Hawaii	21	12	19.3	.404	.432	.697	3.1	2.6	0.6	0.1	6.2

== Personal life ==
Bayles' cousin, Quaden, is an actor.
