= Carina State School =

Primary school in Brisbane, Australia

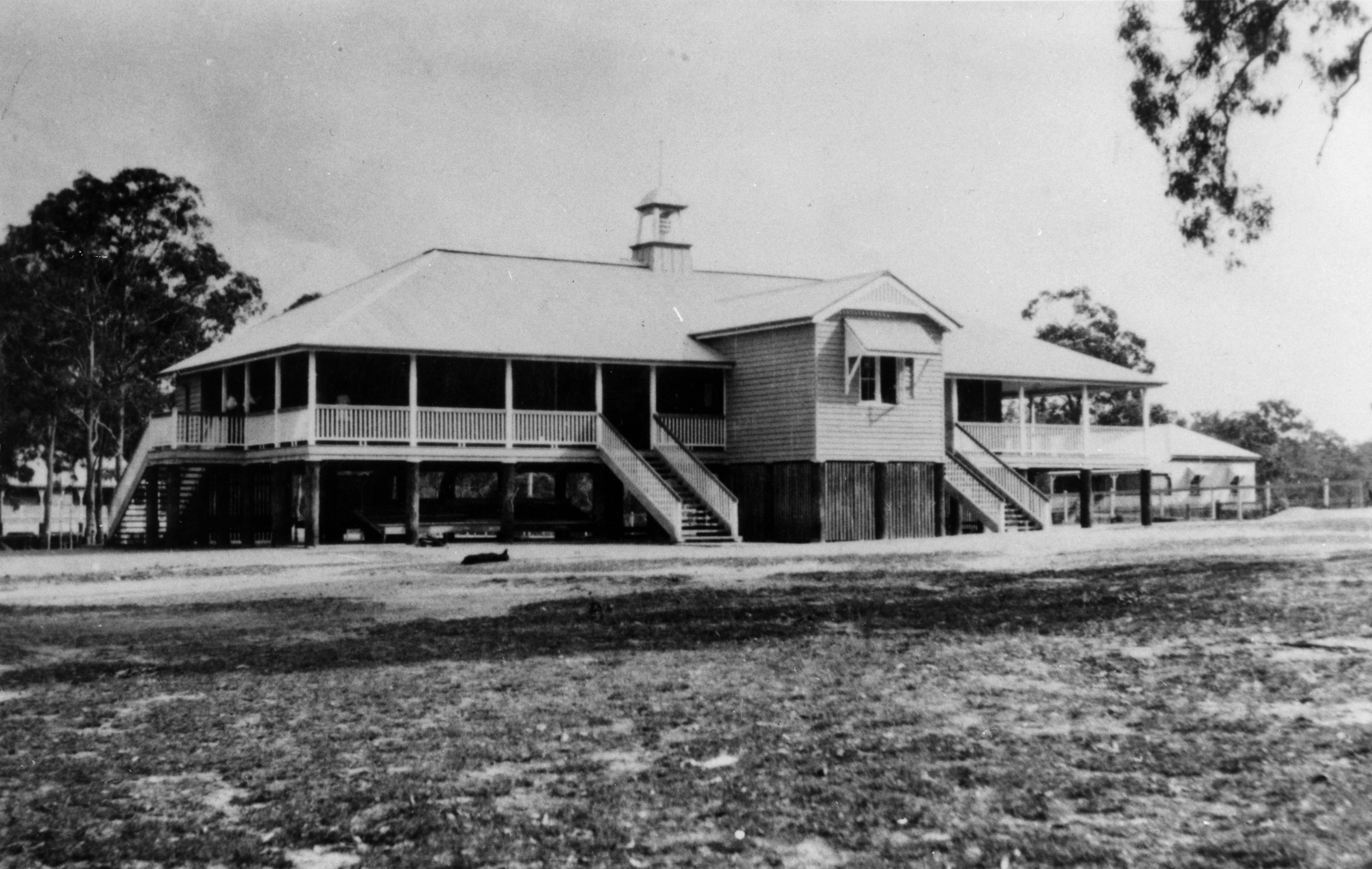
- Carina State School, c.1940

Location
- 1413 Creek Road; Brisbane, Queensland, Australia; 27.493559°S 153.102204°E

Information
- Type: Public co-educational primary
- Motto: Yield to None
- Established: 1917
- Principal: Trent Perry
- Teaching staff: 24 (2024)
- Years offered: Prep–Year 6
- Enrolment: 283 (2024)
- Colours: Dark Blue; White; Yellow
- Website: Official site

Carina State School is a public co-educational primary school in the Brisbane suburb of Carindale, Queensland, Australia. It is administered by the Queensland Department of Education, with an enrolment of 283 students and a teaching staff of 24 as of 2024. The school serves students from Prep to Year 6.

It was placed on the Brisbane Heritage Register as a Local Heritage Place on 1 January 2004, due to its historical significance to the growth of the surrounding area.

== History ==
The school was established on 1 January 1917, opening on 30 January 1917, with between 62 and 64 foundation students and Charles Briggs as the head teacher. Charles remained the headmaster until his death in 1944. The construction of the school costed £1,493, and was carried out by Jay Labour. At the time of its opening, the school had one building, which did not change until just prior to the beginning of World War II, when a second building was constructed.

The official opening of the school took place on 10 March 1917, with the Under-Secretary of the Education Department, John Story, opening the school, and not the Minister, Herbert Hardacre, who John apologised in his behalf for not attending. The Minister did not attend due to being unable to leave Clermont because of the flooded state of the area at the time. There were 63 to 68 students on the school roll at this time, with the average daily attendance of 60 pupils throughout February.

In January 1918 a local doctor had examined the school and reported unsatisfactory conditions to the Belmont Shire Council. The unsatisfactory conditions were that a pool of water had accumulated under the school building due to the land being levelled during construction, and not sloped, to allow rainwater to escape, which the doctor stated that it "should never have been passed by the architect or engineer". He forecasted that if an epidemic were to occur, a very rapid spread would follow if the school was not closed. The local council stated that it would resolve the matter with the Education, Works, and Health Departments.

By February of the same year the Minister for Public Instruction (the Education Department), Herbert Hardacre, visited the school to address the unsatisfactory conditions; after reading the reports made by the Works Department, and inspecting the property, he suggested that concrete should be laid instead of asphalt under the school, despite previously quoting a report indicating that the water was running freely and the drainage was satisfactory.

In 1980 when suburb boundaries were modified to make way for the new suburb of Carindale, the school was no longer located in Carina, but the new suburb, however, it kept its original name.

The school ceased corporal punishment on 1 December 1992, before it was banned in Queensland state schools in 1995.

In 2020 student Quaden Bayles was unenrolled from the school due to being bullied by his fellow peers for being short. The student was born with the most common form of Dwarfism, Achondroplasia, and had been dealing with bullying because of it since he was three years old. A livestream conducted by the mother showing the aftermath of his mental state following the incident went viral. The incident prompted a discussion on implementing a new law to address bullying in schools. As of 2023, the boy had got the "most expensive royal independent investigation" into the harsh reality of people with a disability to change the public perception of them. It led to "32 public hearings, 1,785 private sessions, almost 8000 submissions, 28 research reports and about $600 million dollars" from the Disability Royal Commission.

== Demographics ==
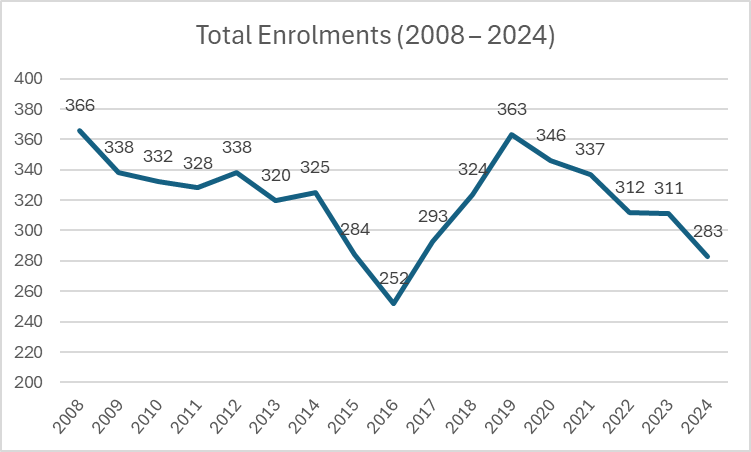
Carina State School Enrolment Data from 2008 to 2024.

In 2022 the school had a student enrolment of 312 students with 26 teachers (22.3 full-time equivalent) and 17 non-teaching staff (10.5 full-time equivalent). Female enrolments consisted of 138 students and Male enrolments consisted of 174 students; Indigenous enrolments accounted for a total of 5% and 34% of students had a language background other than English.

In 2023 the school had a student enrolment of 311 students with 24 teachers (21.8 full-time equivalent) and 16 non-teaching staff (10.4 full-time equivalent). Female enrolments consisted of 143 students and Male enrolments consisted of 168 students; Indigenous enrolments accounted for a total of 6% and 33% of students had a language background other than English.

In 2024 the school had a student enrolment of 283 students with 24 teachers (21.2 full-time equivalent) and 14 non-teaching staff (10.2 full-time equivalent). Female enrolments consisted of 135 students and Male enrolments consisted of 148 students; Indigenous enrolments accounted for a total of 6% and 34% of students had a language background other than English.

== Notable alumni ==
- Quaden Bayles, actor
- Steve Minnikin, politician

== Heritage listing ==
The Brisbane City Council listed the school on the Brisbane Heritage Register as a Local Heritage Place on 1 January 2004, with the citation being created in February 2011. Even though the school was listed in 2004, and the citation was created in 2011, the significance of the school is assessed under the local heritage criteria, which is based on the Brisbane City Plan 2014.

It follows three of the criteria, these being the historical significance (Criterion A), rarity (Criterion B), and historical association (Criterion H).

=== Criterion A – Historical significance ===
To meet the historical significance criteria, the site should illustrate its role in shaping the region's evolution and historical patterns. It meets this guideline due to the opening of the school being influenced by the significant population increase during World War I, partly due to the opening of the Belmont Flier railway several years earlier.

=== Criterion B – Rarity ===
To meet the rarity criteria, the site should showcase aspects of the region's cultural heritage that is either rare, uncommon or endangered. It meets this criterion because the school has preserved and maintained its original rooftop bell tower from the early interwar period.

=== Criterion H – Historical association ===
To meet the historical association criteria, the site must have a significant association with the life or work of specific individuals, groups or organisations of importance to the region's history. It meets this criterion due to serving the community demographics of the surrounding area since 1917.

== See also ==
- Carindale
- Education in Queensland
- List of schools in Greater Brisbane
