= Akoldah Gak =

Australian basketball player (born 2002)

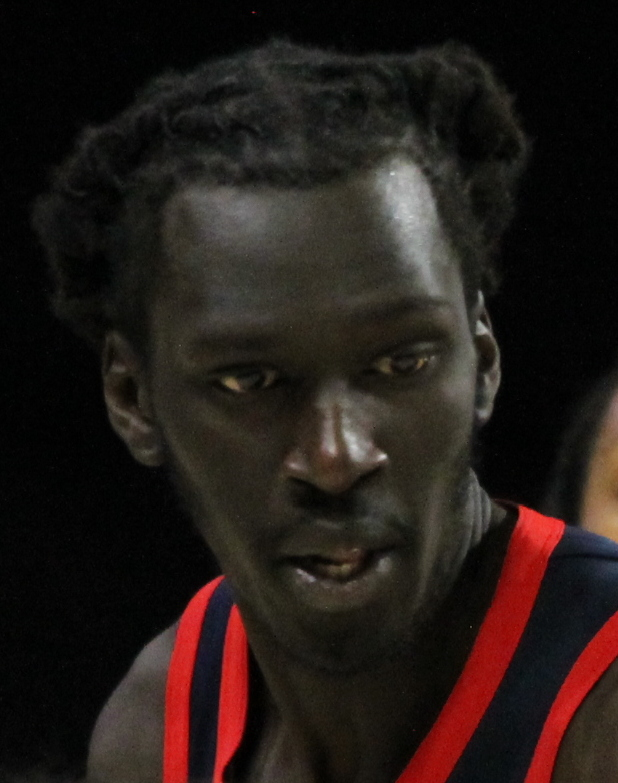
- Gak with the Capital City Go-Go in 2026

Oklahoma Sooners
- Position: Power forward / center
- Conference: Southeastern Conference

Personal information
- Born: 12 July 2002 (age 24) Sydney, New South Wales, Australia
- Listed height: 6 ft 11 in (2.11 m)
- Listed weight: 225 lb (102 kg)

Career information
- High school: St Dominic's College (Sydney, New South Wales); Blair Academy (Blairstown, New Jersey)
- College: Oklahoma (2026–present)
- NBA draft: 2022: undrafted
- Playing career: 2020–2026

Career history
- 2020–2023: Illawarra Hawks
- 2022: Illawarra Hawks (NBL1 East)
- 2023: Southern Districts Spartans
- 2023–2025: Cairns Taipans
- 2024: West Adelaide Bearcats
- 2025: Mexico City Capitanes
- 2025–2026: Capital City Go-Go

Career highlights
- NBL1 Central U23 Player of the Year (2024)
- Stats at NBA.com
- Stats at Basketball Reference

Akoldah Gak (born 12 July 2002) is an Australian college basketball player for the Oklahoma Sooners of the Southeastern Conference (SEC).

== Early life ==
Gak was born in Sydney, New South Wales, to parents who had fled South Sudan and moved to Australia. He attended St Dominic's College in Sydney, and played junior representative basketball for Penrith. Gak received a scholarship to attend Blair Academy in the United States in 2018 through a basketball pipeline that was established by professional basketball player and Blair alumni, Luol Deng.

== College career ==
On April 27, 2026, Gak committed to play college basketball for the Oklahoma Sooners.

== Professional career ==
On 12 October 2020, Gak signed a three-year deal with the Illawarra Hawks of the National Basketball League (NBL). He was rostered as a development player during the 2020–21 NBL season before he became a contracted player for the remainder of his tenure. Gak's family chose for him to develop in Australia due to the global uncertainty from the COVID-19 pandemic; Hawks head coach Brian Goorjian considered the assignment of a National Basketball Association (NBA) prospect to his team as a "real compliment". Gak received limited playing time during his three seasons with the Hawks.

In the 2022 off-season, Gak played for the Chicago Bulls in the NBA Summer League and had a one-game stint with the Illawarra Hawks in the NBL1 East. In the 2023 off-season, he played for the Southern Districts Spartans in the NBL1 North.

On 10 April 2023, Gak signed a two-year deal with the Cairns Taipans.

Gak joined the West Adelaide Bearcats of the NBL1 Central for the 2024 season. He was named the NBL1 Central U23 Player of the Year.

On 4 December 2024, Gak was ruled out for a month with a knee injury.

On 2 March 2025, Gak signed with the Mexico City Capitanes of the NBA G League. He joined the Washington Wizards for the 2025 NBA Summer League, and was subsequently invited to their training camp. He was then added to the Wizards' G League affiliate, the Capital City Go-Go.

== National team career ==
Gak played for the Australia men's national under-19 basketball team at the 2021 FIBA Under-19 Basketball World Cup. In 2022, he played for the Australian Boomers in three FIBA World Cup Asian qualifiers.

== Personal life ==
Two of Gak's older brothers have played college basketball: Gorjok for the California Baptist Lancers and Deng for the Miami Hurricanes. Deng was born in Cairo, Egypt.
