= 2021 FIBA Under-19 Basketball World Cup =

Basketball tournament in Latvia

Tournament details
- Host country: Latvia
- Cities: Riga; Daugavpils
- Dates: 3–11 July
- Teams: 16 (from 5 confederations)
- Venues: 3 (in 2 host cities)

Final positions
- Champions: United States (8th title)
- Runners-up: France
- Third place: Canada
- Fourth place: Serbia

Tournament statistics
- Games played: 56
- Attendance: 3,198 (57 per game)
- MVP: (United States) Chet Holmgren
- Top scorer: (South Korea) Yeo Jun-seok (25.6 points per game)

Official website
- www.fiba.basketball

The 2021 FIBA Under-19 Basketball World Cup (Latvian: 2021. gada FIBA Pasaules kauss basketbolā līdz 19 gadu vecumam) was the 15th edition of the FIBA Under-19 Basketball World Cup, the biennial international men's youth basketball championship contested by the U19 national teams of the member associations of FIBA. The tournament was hosted in Riga and Daugavpils, Latvia from 3 to 11 July 2021.

The United States defeated France in the final to capture their eighth title.

== Venues ==
Riga		Daugavpils	2021 FIBA Under-19 Basketball World Cup is located in Latvia
Arena Riga	Olympic Sports Centre	Daugavpils Olympic Center	2021 FIBA Under-19 Basketball World Cup is located in Latvia
Capacity: 11,200	Capacity: 830	Capacity: 1,000	2021 FIBA Under-19 Basketball World Cup is located in Latvia

== Qualified teams ==
Means of qualification	Dates	Venue	Berths	Qualifiers
Host nation	12 February 2021	—N/a	1	Latvia
European selection (Top 5 FIBA Europe teams in World Ranking)	7 April 2020	—N/a	5	France; Lithuania; Serbia; Spain; Turkey
2020 FIBA Under-18 African Championship	December 2020	Cairo	2	Mali; Senegal
Americas selection (Top 4 FIBA Americas teams in World Ranking)	1 March 2021	—N/a	4	Argentina; Canada; Puerto Rico; United States
Asia selection (Top 4 FIBA Asia teams in World Ranking)	10 March 2021	—N/a	4	Australia; ~~China~~; Iran; Japan; South Korea
Total			16	

China withdrew before the competition due to strict anti-epidemic measures. They were replaced by Iran.

== Draw ==
The draw took place on 28 April 2021 in Berlin, Germany.

=== Seeding ===
On 27 April 2021, the pots were announced.

Pot 1	Pot 2	Pot 3	Pot 4
United States; Canada; Spain; Latvia	France; Lithuania; Turkey; Serbia	Australia; South Korea; Japan; Iran	Argentina; Puerto Rico; Mali; Senegal

== Preliminary round ==
All times are local (UTC+3).

=== Group A ===
Pos	Team	Pld	W	L	PF	PA	PD	Pts
1	Canada	3	3	0	265	202	+63	6
2	Lithuania	3	2	1	244	216	+28	5
3	Senegal	3	1	2	205	234	−29	4
4	Japan	3	0	3	209	271	−62	3

Source: FIBA
Rules for classification: 1) Points; 2) Head-to-head results; 3) Points difference; 4) Points scored.

3 July 2021
12:00

Boxscore

Senegal	76–71	Japan
Scoring by quarter: 20–25, 22–15, 17–14, 17–17
Pts: Sow 18; Rebs: Diop 9 Asts: Magassa 6		Pts: Iwashita 15; Rebs: Iwashita, Yoneyama 5 Asts: Iwashita 5

Daugavpils Olympic Center, Daugavpils
Attendance: 60
Referees: Leonardo Zalazar (ARG), Özlem Yalman (TUR), Ryan Jones (NZL)

3 July 2021
15:00

Boxscore

Canada	80–71	Lithuania
Scoring by quarter: 17–16, 15–26, 19–13, 29–16
Pts: Houstan, Nembhard 18; Rebs: Edey 16; Asts: Houstan, Nembhard 3		Pts: Tubelis 32; Rebs: Tubelis 12; Asts: Marčiulionis 9

Daugavpils Olympic Center, Daugavpils
Attendance: 70
Referees: Julio Anaya (PAN), Maj Forsberg (DEN), Grant Todey (USA)

4 July 2021
12:00

Boxscore

Japan	75–100	Canada
Scoring by quarter: 15–13, 18–27, 21–36, 21–24
Pts: Yoneyama 18; Rebs: Yoneyama 5 Asts: Harper Jr. 6		Pts: Felder 30; Rebs: Edey 15; Asts: Nembhard 5

Daugavpils Olympic Center, Daugavpils
Attendance: 20
Referees: Kerem Baki (TUR), Carlos Peralta (ECU), Amr Aboollo (EGY)

4 July 2021
15:00

Boxscore

Lithuania	78–73	Senegal
Scoring by quarter: 21–15, 23–17, 17–22, 17–19
Pts: Rubštavičius, Stenionis 14; Rebs: Krivas, Tubelis 6 Asts: Krivas, Stenionis 6		Pts: Badji 23; Rebs: Badji 14; Asts: Magassa 5

Daugavpils Olympic Center, Daugavpils
Attendance: 65
Referees: Amy Bonner (USA), Leonardo Zalazar (ARG), Arnold Moseya (RSA)

6 July 2021
12:00

Boxscore

Senegal	56–85	Canada
Scoring by quarter: 13–27, 13–23, 13–15, 17–20
Pts: Magassa 16; Rebs: Diop, Badji 9 Asts: Magassa 3		Pts: Edey 18; Rebs: Edey 17; Asts: Nembhard 8

Daugavpils Olympic Center, Daugavpils
Attendance: 20
Referees: Grant Todey (USA), Özlem Yalman (TUR), Amr Aboollo (EGY)

6 July 2021
15:00

Boxscore

Lithuania	95–63	Japan
Scoring by quarter: 28–13, 29–19, 21–9, 17–22
Pts: Lelevičius, Tubelis 15; Rebs: Rubštavičius 8 Asts: Stenionis 5		Pts: Harper, Ogawa 10; Rebs: Yoneyama 6 Asts: four players 2

Daugavpils Olympic Center, Daugavpils
Attendance: 55
Referees: Amy Bonner (USA), Park Kyoung-jin (KOR), Virginia Peruchini (ARG)

=== Group B ===
Pos	Team	Pld	W	L	PF	PA	PD	Pts
1	Serbia	3	3	0	243	201	+42	6
2	Latvia (H)	3	1	2	203	198	+5	4 (Note: Latvia 1–1, +6 PD; Iran 1–1, +3 PD; Puerto Rico 1–1, −9 PD)
3	Iran	3	1	2	196	214	−18	4
4	Puerto Rico	3	1	2	211	240	−29	4

Source: FIBA
Rules for classification: 1) Points; 2) Head-to-head results; 3) Points difference; 4) Points scored.
(H) Hosts
Notes:

3 July 2021
18:00

Boxscore

Puerto Rico	79–75	Latvia
Scoring by quarter: 15–18, 19–18, 14–25, 31–14
Pts: Clark 24; Rebs: Ezquerra, Pinzon 5 Asts: Pinzon, Rubayo 4		Pts: Vanags 17; Rebs: Helmanis 8 Asts: Skuja 7

Daugavpils Olympic Center, Daugavpils
Attendance: 100
Referees: Kerem Baki (TUR), Carlos Peralta (ECU), Virginia Peruchini (ARG)

3 July 2021
21:00

Boxscore

Iran	67–88	Serbia
Scoring by quarter: 19–14, 14–22, 17–22, 17–30
Pts: Lakzaeifard, Yazarloo 11; Rebs: Rahimi 9 Asts: Girgoorian, Shahryari 3		Pts: Škobalj 17; Rebs: Škobalj 9 Asts: Đurišić 6

Daugavpils Olympic Center, Daugavpils
Attendance: 30
Referees: Zdenko Tomašovič (SVK), Park Kyoung-jin (KOR), Arnold Moseya (RSA)

4 July 2021
18:00

Boxscore

Latvia	58–48	Iran
Scoring by quarter: 15–17, 8–12, 11–9, 24–10
Pts: Feierbergs 17; Rebs: Macoha 12; Asts: Skuja 4		Pts: Fallah 16; Rebs: Fallah, Yazarloo 6 Asts: Fallah, Rahimi 3

Daugavpils Olympic Center, Daugavpils
Attendance: 150
Referees: Zdenko Tomašovič (SVK), Park Kyoung-jin (KOR), Virginia Peruchini (ARG)

4 July 2021
21:00

Boxscore

Serbia	84–64	Puerto Rico
Scoring by quarter: 19–19, 20–20, 30–7, 15–18
Pts: Jović 16; Rebs: Jović 11; Asts: Kovačević 10		Pts: Clark 24; Rebs: Pinzon 9 Asts: Pinzon 4

Daugavpils Olympic Center, Daugavpils
Attendance: 35
Referees: Julio Anaya (PAN), Maj Forsberg (DEN), Ryan Jones (NZL)

6 July 2021
18:00

Boxscore

Serbia	71–70	Latvia
Scoring by quarter: 16–24, 16–21, 19–8, 20–17
Pts: Jović 16; Rebs: Škobalj 8 Asts: Kovačević 4		Pts: Macoha 16; Rebs: Viljamsons 7 Asts: Skuja 4

Daugavpils Olympic Center, Daugavpils
Attendance: 100
Referees: Julio Anaya (PAN), Maj Forsberg (DEN), Leonardo Zalazar (ARG)

6 July 2021
21:00

Boxscore

Puerto Rico	68–81	Iran
Scoring by quarter: 16–22, 14–12, 20–18, 18–29
Pts: Pinzon 19; Rebs: Wheeler 11; Asts: Clark, Pinzon 5		Pts: Girgoorian 24; Rebs: Fallah 11; Asts: Lakzaeifard 9

Daugavpils Olympic Center, Daugavpils
Attendance: 40
Referees: Kerem Baki (TUR), Ryan Jones (NZL), Arnold Moseya (RSA)

=== Group C ===
Pos	Team	Pld	W	L	PF	PA	PD	Pts
1	France	3	2	1	265	160	+105	5 (Note: France 1–1, +36 PD; Spain 1–1, 0 PD; Argentina 1–1, −36 PD)
2	Spain	3	2	1	227	176	+51	5
3	Argentina	3	2	1	233	231	+2	5
4	South Korea	3	0	3	170	328	−158	3

Source: FIBA
Rules for classification: 1) Points; 2) Head-to-head results; 3) Points difference; 4) Points scored.
Notes:

3 July 2021
11:30

Boxscore

France	117–48	South Korea
Scoring by quarter: 20–11, 23–16, 41–12, 33–9
Pts: Strazel, Wembanyama 16; Rebs: Tchicamboud 11; Asts: Tchicamboud, Wembanyama 5		Pts: Kim D. 19; Rebs: Yeo 8 Asts: five players 1

Olympic Sports Centre, Riga
Attendance: 22
Referees: Andris Aunkrogers (LAT), Viola Györgyi (NOR), Daigo Urushima (JPN)

3 July 2021
14:30

Boxscore

Argentina	69–68	Spain
Scoring by quarter: 11–21, 17–16, 25–15, 16–16
Pts: Azpilicueta 15; Rebs: Fernández 7 Asts: Fernández 3		Pts: Domínguez 13; Rebs: Alderete 7 Asts: Núñez, Penarroya 3

Olympic Sports Centre, Riga
Attendance: 35
Referees: Wojciech Liszka (POL), Maripier Malo (CAN), Gvidas Gedvilas (LTU)

4 July 2021
11:30

Boxscore

South Korea	74–112	Argentina
Scoring by quarter: 13–33, 22–16, 20–35, 19–28
Pts: Yeo 27; Rebs: Yeo 13; Asts: Kim T., Yeo 3		Pts: Rodríguez 26; Rebs: Corbalan, Rodríguez 9 Asts: Díaz 7

Olympic Sports Centre, Riga
Attendance: 31
Referees: Carsten Straube (GER), Gvidas Gedvilas (LTU), Andrada Csender (ROU)

4 July 2021
14:30

Boxscore

Spain	60–59 (OT)	France
Scoring by quarter: 8–16, 11–11, 18–10, 15–15, Overtime: 8–7
Pts: Domínguez 14; Rebs: Jiménez 9 Asts: Ferrando 3		Pts: Wembanyama 22; Rebs: Wembanyama 10; Asts: Strazel 9

Olympic Sports Centre, Riga
Attendance: 50
Referees: Andris Aunkrogers (LAT), Maripier Malo (CAN), Nathaniel Saunders (CAN)

6 July 2021
11:30

Boxscore

South Korea	48–99	Spain
Scoring by quarter: 14–17, 12–23, 9–24, 13–35
Pts: Yeo 26; Rebs: Yeo 12; Asts: Lee K. 3		Pts: Jiménez 20; Rebs: Godspower 10; Asts: Peñarroya, Ferrando 7

Olympic Sports Centre, Riga
Attendance: 40
Referees: Alexis Mercado (PUR), Andrada Csender (ROU), Mbaye Seye (SEN)

6 July 2021
14:30

Boxscore

Argentina	52–89	France
Scoring by quarter: 9–16, 11–24, 23–19, 9–30
Pts: Fernández 14; Rebs: Fernández 9 Asts: Díaz 2		Pts: Ugolin 13; Rebs: Wembanyama 12; Asts: Strazel 6

Olympic Sports Centre, Riga
Attendance: 40
Referees: Andreia Silva (BRA), Martin Vulić (CRO), Daigo Urushima (JPN)

=== Group D ===
Pos	Team	Pld	W	L	PF	PA	PD	Pts
1	United States	3	3	0	270	172	+98	6
2	Turkey	3	2	1	176	199	−23	5
3	Australia	3	1	2	225	218	+7	4
4	Mali	3	0	3	173	255	−82	3

Source: FIBA
Rules for classification: 1) Points; 2) Head-to-head results; 3) Points difference; 4) Points scored.

3 July 2021
17:30

Boxscore

Turkey	54–83	United States
Scoring by quarter: 9–29, 11–17, 18–17, 16–20
Pts: Mutaf 12; Rebs: Mutaf 8 Asts: Mutaf, Yılmaz 4		Pts: Ivey 21; Rebs: Holmgren 9 Asts: Chandler, Holmgren 5

Olympic Sports Centre, Riga
Attendance: 50
Referees: Carsten Straube (GER), Nathaniel Saunders (CAN), Viola Györgyi (NOR)

3 July 2021
20:30

Boxscore

Mali	67–97	Australia
Scoring by quarter: 17–18, 17–21, 11–36, 22–22
Pts: Dembelé 12; Rebs: Ballo, Diaby 8 Asts: Ballo 4		Pts: Gak 15; Rebs: Gak 9 Asts: Bayles 5

Olympic Sports Centre, Riga
Attendance: 22
Referees: Martin Vulić (CRO), Andreia Silva (BRA), Mohammad Taha (JOR)

4 July 2021
17:30

Boxscore

Australia	62–64	Turkey
Scoring by quarter: 7–18, 27–16, 15–12, 13–18
Pts: Bayles 15; Rebs: Daniels 6 Asts: Daniels 8		Pts: Mutaf 13; Rebs: Haltalı 12; Asts: Yılmaz 5

Olympic Sports Centre, Riga
Attendance: 15
Referees: Andreia Silva (BRA), Alexis Mercado (PUR), Daigo Urushima (JPN)

4 July 2021
20:30

Boxscore

United States	100–52	Mali
Scoring by quarter: 29–23, 26–13, 25–8, 20–8
Pts: three players 14; Rebs: Baldwin Jr., Ingram 7 Asts: Miles Jr. 6		Pts: Ballo, Sidibe 9 Rebs: Traoré 10; Asts: Ballo, Traoré 3

Olympic Sports Centre, Riga
Attendance: 38
Referees: Wojciech Liszka (POL), Martin Vulić (CRO), Mbaye Seye (SEN)

6 July 2021
17:30

Boxscore

Turkey	58–54	Mali
Scoring by quarter: 17–10, 15–20, 15–10, 11–14
Pts: Mutaf 13; Rebs: Haltalı 7 Asts: Yılmaz, Yildizoglu 4		Pts: Ballo 16; Rebs: Ballo 13; Asts: Coulibaly 5

Olympic Sports Centre, Riga
Attendance: 30
Referees: Andris Aunkrogers (LAT), Mohammad Taha (JOR), Viola Györgyi (NOR)

6 July 2021
20:30

Boxscore

Australia	66–87	United States
Scoring by quarter: 16–24, 26–20, 8–23, 16–20
Pts: Daniels 18; Rebs: Jones 7 Asts: Daniels 4		Pts: Miles Jr., Lofton Jr. 16; Rebs: Holmgren 8 Asts: three players 3

Olympic Sports Centre, Riga
Attendance: 100
Referees: Wojciech Liszka (POL), Maripier Malo (CAN), Nathaniel Saunders (CAN)

== Knockout stage ==
=== Bracket ===
Round of 16
7 July
Canada	86
Puerto Rico	56
7 July
Spain	86
Australia	73
7 July
Senegal	57
Latvia	44
7 July
South Korea	60
United States	132
7 July
Lithuania	96
Iran	53
7 July
France	86
Mali	52
7 July
Japan	86
Serbia	89
7 July
Argentina	76
Turkey	74

Quarter-finals
9 July
Canada	81
Spain	77
9 July
Senegal	58
United States	88
9 July
Lithuania	79
France (OT)	84
9 July
Serbia	89
Argentina	83

Semi-finals
10 July
Canada	86
United States	92
10 July
France	75
Serbia	69

Final
11 July
United States	83
France	81
Third place
11 July
Canada	101
Serbia	92

5–8th place bracket

5–8th place semifinals
10 July
Spain	83
Senegal	67
10 July
Lithuania	107
Argentina	81

Fifth place
11 July
Spain (OT)	86
Lithuania	81
Seventh place
11 July
Senegal	75
Argentina	67

9–16th place bracket

9–16th place quarterfinals
9 July
Puerto Rico	52
Australia	95
9 July
Latvia	90
South Korea	67
9 July
Iran	71
Mali	59
9 July
Japan	49
Turkey	97

9–12th place semifinals
10 July
Australia	89
Latvia	44
10 July
Iran	61
Turkey	84

Ninth place
11 July
Australia	52
Turkey	56
Eleventh place
11 July
Latvia	71
Iran	63

13–16th place bracket

13–16th place semifinals
10 July
Puerto Rico	99
South Korea	89
10 July
Mali	104
Japan	66

13th place
11 July
Puerto Rico	92
Mali (OT)	95
15th place
11 July
South Korea	95
Japan	92

=== Round of 16 ===
7 July 2021
11:00

Boxscore

France	86–52	Mali
Scoring by quarter: 29–18, 13–15, 24–6, 20–13
Pts: Tchicamboud 14; Rebs: Frisch 8 Asts: Tchicamboud 8		Pts: Sidibe 13; Rebs: Dembelé 9 Asts: Konate, Ballo 3

Olympic Sports Centre, Riga
Attendance: 45
Referees: Martin Vulić (CRO), Alexis Mercado (PUR), Mohammad Taha (JOR)

7 July 2021
12:00

Boxscore

Japan	86–89	Serbia
Scoring by quarter: 17–22, 24–20, 19–20, 26–27
Pts: Yamazaki 23; Rebs: Yamazaki 4 Asts: Iwashita 6		Pts: Jović 28; Rebs: Mušikić 10; Asts: Jović, Petrović 6

Daugavpils Olympic Center, Daugavpils
Attendance: 40
Referees: Amy Bonner (USA), Carlos Peralta (ECU), Ryan Jones (NZL)

7 July 2021
14:30

Boxscore

Spain	86–73	Australia
Scoring by quarter: 25–24, 23–15, 18–13, 20–21
Pts: Domínguez 24; Rebs: Godspower 11; Asts: Ferrando 6		Pts: Gak 16; Rebs: Gak 7 Asts: Daniels 6

Olympic Sports Centre, Riga
Attendance: 41
Referees: Andris Aunkrogers (LAT), Andreia Silva (BRA), Carsten Straube (GER)

7 July 2021
15:00

Boxscore

Lithuania	96–53	Iran
Scoring by quarter: 23–9, 23–14, 26–18, 24–12
Pts: Pivorius 17; Rebs: Krivas, Tubelis 6 Asts: Marčiulionis 7		Pts: Shahryari 13; Rebs: Fallah 10; Asts: Yazarloo 2

Daugavpils Olympic Center, Daugavpils
Attendance: 50
Referees: Zdenko Tomašovič (SVK), Maj Forsberg (DEN), Grant Todey (USA)

7 July 2021
17:30

Boxscore

Argentina	76–74	Turkey
Scoring by quarter: 18–18, 20–11, 10–21, 28–24
Pts: Corbalan 25; Rebs: Rodríguez 6 Asts: Corbalan, Pérez 3		Pts: Haltalı 19; Rebs: Haltalı 10; Asts: Haltalı, Tuna 4

Olympic Sports Centre, Riga
Attendance: 30
Referees: Wojciech Liszka (POL), Maripier Malo (CAN), Nathaniel Saunders (CAN)

7 July 2021
18:00

Boxscore

Senegal	57–44	Latvia
Scoring by quarter: 17–11, 7–9, 14–9, 19–15
Pts: Sane 17; Rebs: Magassa, Ndongo 11; Asts: Magassa, Ndongo 3		Pts: Vanags 10; Rebs: Feierbergs 8 Asts: Skuja 4

Daugavpils Olympic Center, Daugavpils
Attendance: 100
Referees: Kerem Baki (TUR), Özlem Yalman (TUR), Leonardo Zalazar (ARG)

7 July 2021
20:30

Boxscore

South Korea	60–132	United States
Scoring by quarter: 17–31, 13–28, 16–28, 14–45
Pts: Yeo 21; Rebs: Kim D. 4 Asts: Kim T. 3		Pts: Holmgren 17; Rebs: Holmgren 10; Asts: Miller, Chandler 7

Olympic Sports Centre, Riga
Attendance: 30
Referees: Gvidas Gedvilas (LTU), Daigo Urushima (JPN), Viola Györgyi (NOR)

7 July 2021
21:00

Boxscore

Canada	86–56	Puerto Rico
Scoring by quarter: 21–8, 23–16, 31–13, 11–19
Pts: Fisher, Houstan 14; Rebs: Owusu-Anane, Edey 8 Asts: Nembhard 10		Pts: Pinzón 12; Rebs: Nazario 5 Asts: Ezquerra 4

Daugavpils Olympic Center, Daugavpils
Attendance: 20
Referees: Julio Anaya (PAN), Park Kyoung-jin (KOR), Virginia Peruchini (ARG)

=== 9–16th place quarterfinals ===
9 July 2021
11:30

Boxscore

Puerto Rico	52–95	Australia
Scoring by quarter: 16–19, 20–26, 8–16, 8–34
Pts: Wheeler 14; Rebs: Wheeler 10; Asts: three players 2		Pts: Smith 19; Rebs: three players 8 Asts: Armstrong, Bayles 5

Olympic Sports Centre, Riga
Attendance: 15
Referees: Wojciech Liszka (POL), Maj Forsberg (DEN), Carsten Straube (GER)

9 July 2021
14:30

Boxscore

Iran	71–59	Mali
Scoring by quarter: 12–15, 23–13, 12–15, 24–16
Pts: Fallah 21; Rebs: Fallah 8 Asts: Shahryari 6		Pts: Togo 18; Rebs: Ballo 10; Asts: Ballo 6

Olympic Sports Centre, Riga
Attendance: 16
Referees: Leonardo Zalazar (ARG), Park Kyoung-jin (KOR), Amr Aboollo (EGY)

9 July 2021
17:30

Boxscore

Latvia	90–67	South Korea
Scoring by quarter: 23–17, 23–12, 19–19, 25–19
Pts: Helmanis 30; Rebs: Helmanis 11; Asts: Denafs 7		Pts: Yeo 26; Rebs: Yeo 13; Asts: Cho 5

Olympic Sports Centre, Riga
Attendance: 51
Referees: Zdenko Tomašovič (SVK), Andrada Csender (ROU), Mbaye Seye (SEN)

9 July 2021
20:30

Boxscore

Japan	49–97	Turkey
Scoring by quarter: 14–24, 8–22, 16–32, 11–19
Pts: Kibayashi, Ogawa 8 Rebs: Ogawa 5 Asts: Yamazaki 4		Pts: Bona 20; Rebs: Büyüktuncel, Yiğitoğlu 8 Asts: three players 4

Olympic Sports Centre, Riga
Attendance: 12
Referees: Grant Todey (USA), Gvidas Gedvilas (LTU), Arnold Moseya (RSA)

=== Quarterfinals ===
9 July 2021
12:00

Boxscore

Canada	81–77	Spain
Scoring by quarter: 18–18, 19–21, 21–20, 23–18
Pts: Houstan 25; Rebs: Edey 15; Asts: Nembhard 5		Pts: Domínguez 21; Rebs: Domènech 11; Asts: Ferrando, Domínguez 5

Arena Riga, Riga
Attendance: 70
Referees: Carlos Peralta (ECU), Amy Bonner (USA), Martin Vulić (CRO)

9 July 2021
15:00

Boxscore

Lithuania	79–84 (OT)	France
Scoring by quarter: 21–15, 14–18, 16–20, 18–16, Overtime: 10–15
Pts: Tubelis 19; Rebs: Tubelis 13; Asts: Stenionis 5		Pts: Strazel 23; Rebs: Wembanyama 6 Asts: Strazel, Tchicamboud 5

Arena Riga, Riga
Attendance: 100
Referees: Julio Anaya (PAN), Maripier Malo (CAN), Daigo Urushima (JPN)

9 July 2021
18:00

Boxscore

Senegal	58–88	United States
Scoring by quarter: 14–32, 18–15, 12–18, 14–23
Pts: Diop 20; Rebs: Diop 12; Asts: Ndongo 5		Pts: Ivey 12; Rebs: Kalkbrenner 8 Asts: Miles Jr. 5

Arena Riga, Riga
Attendance: 30
Referees: Kerem Baki (TUR), Ryan Jones (NZL), Virginia Peruchini (ARG)

9 July 2021
21:00

Boxscore

Serbia	89–83	Argentina
Scoring by quarter: 21–20, 21–16, 21–17, 26–30
Pts: Jović 26; Rebs: Jović 13; Asts: Kovačević, Petrović 5		Pts: Fernández 33; Rebs: Fernández 16; Asts: Méndez 5

Arena Riga, Riga
Attendance: 40
Referees: Andris Aunkrogers (LAT), Andreia Silva (BRA), Alexis Mercado (PUR)

=== 13–16th place semifinals ===
10 July 2021
11:30

Boxscore

Puerto Rico	99–89	South Korea
Scoring by quarter: 33–30, 20–18, 21–18, 25–23
Pts: Wheeler 31; Rebs: Pinzon 9 Asts: Clark 12		Pts: Yeo 31; Rebs: Yeo 13; Asts: Yeo 6

Olympic Sports Centre, Riga
Attendance: 10
Referees: Nathaniel Saunders (CAN), Arnold Moseya (RSA), Amr Aboollo (EGY)

10 July 2021
14:30

Boxscore

Mali	104–66	Japan
Scoring by quarter: 27–17, 18–7, 27–16, 32–26
Pts: Ballo 18; Rebs: Ballo, Diaby 11; Asts: Coulibaly 10		Pts: Asai 9 Rebs: Yamanouchi 11; Asts: Iwashita, Ogawa 4

Olympic Sports Centre, Riga
Attendance: 15
Referees: Özlem Yalman (TUR), Andrada Csender (ROU), Mbaye Seye (SEN)

=== 9–12th place semifinals ===
10 July 2021
17:30

Boxscore

Australia	89–44	Latvia
Scoring by quarter: 25–6, 21–12, 23–4, 20–22
Pts: Daniels 19; Rebs: three players 7 Asts: Jones 6		Pts: Viljamsons 8 Rebs: Viljamsons 11; Asts: Briedis 3

Olympic Sports Centre, Riga
Attendance: 45
Referees: Andreia Silva (BRA), Park Kyoung-jin (KOR), Viola Györgyi (NOR)

10 July 2021
20:30

Boxscore

Iran	61–84	Turkey
Scoring by quarter: 15–11, 11–25, 18–20, 17–28
Pts: Fallah 15; Rebs: Fallah 9 Asts: Shahryari 7		Pts: Gorener 18; Rebs: Bona 8 Asts: Yılmaz 7

Olympic Sports Centre, Riga
Attendance: 12
Referees: Gvidas Gedvilas (LTU), Carlos Peralta (ECU), Mohammad Taha (JOR)

=== 5–8th place semifinals ===
10 July 2021
12:00

Boxscore

Spain	83–67	Senegal
Scoring by quarter: 21–10, 20–16, 23–19, 19–22
Pts: Etxeguren 16; Rebs: Etxeguren 8 Asts: Núñez 7		Pts: Diop 23; Rebs: Diop 7 Asts: Diop, Mboup 3

Arena Riga, Riga
Attendance: 20
Referees: Andris Aunkrogers (LAT), Maripier Malo (CAN), Grant Todey (USA)

10 July 2021
15:00

Boxscore

Lithuania	107–81	Argentina
Scoring by quarter: 34–14, 24–29, 21–21, 28–17
Pts: Stenionis 22; Rebs: Tubelis 7 Asts: Stenionis 7		Pts: Méndez 21; Rebs: Merlo 7 Asts: Díaz 5

Arena Riga, Riga
Attendance: 30
Referees: Zdenko Tomašovič (SVK), Amy Bonner (USA), Carsten Straube (GER)

=== Semifinals ===
10 July 2021
18:00

Boxscore

Canada	86–92	United States
Scoring by quarter: 19–24, 19–25, 25–20, 23–23
Pts: Houstan 23; Rebs: Edey 16; Asts: Nembhard 6		Pts: Lofton Jr. 16; Rebs: Holmgren 8 Asts: Miller 7

Arena Riga, Riga
Attendance: 100
Referees: Julio Anaya (PAN), Martin Vulić (CRO), Daigo Urushima (JPN)

10 July 2021
21:00

Boxscore

France	75–69	Serbia
Scoring by quarter: 13–23, 20–16, 20–18, 22–12
Pts: Tchicamboud 19; Rebs: Ouedraogo 15; Asts: Strazel 10		Pts: Jović, Stefanović 15; Rebs: Jović 9 Asts: Mušikić 7

Arena Riga, Riga
Attendance: 100
Referees: Wojciech Liszka (POL), Leonardo Zalazar (ARG), Kerem Baki (TUR)

=== 15th place game ===
11 July 2021
09:00

Boxscore

South Korea	95–92	Japan
Scoring by quarter: 24–22, 23–25, 24–19, 24–26
Pts: Yeo 36; Rebs: Yeo 12; Asts: Kim T. 6		Pts: Yamazaki 32; Rebs: Harper Jr. 13; Asts: Harper Jr. 13

Olympic Sports Centre, Riga
Attendance: 5
Referees: Viola Györgyi (NOR), Mohammad Taha (JOR), Mbaye Seye (SEN)

=== 13th place game ===
11 July 2021
12:00

Boxscore

Puerto Rico	92–95 (OT)	Mali
Scoring by quarter: 15–11, 23–22, 11–25, 28–19, Overtime: 15–18
Pts: Clark 23; Rebs: Pinzon 10; Asts: Pinzon 8		Pts: Dembelé 17; Rebs: Ballo, Dembelé 9 Asts: Coulibaly, Sidibe 5

Olympic Sports Centre, Riga
Attendance: 19
Referees: Zdenko Tomašovič (SVK), Maj Forsberg (DEN), Amr Aboollo (EGY)

=== Eleventh place game ===
11 July 2021
15:00

Boxscore

Latvia	71–63	Iran
Scoring by quarter: 15–13, 9–7, 19–22, 28–21
Pts: Denafs 20; Rebs: Helmanis, Feierbergs 12; Asts: Helmanis 11		Pts: Fallah 25; Rebs: Fallah 11; Asts: Lakzaeifard 5

Olympic Sports Centre, Riga
Attendance: 10
Referees: Özlem Yalman (TUR), Carsten Straube (GER), Alexis Mercado (PUR)

=== Ninth place game ===
11 July 2021
18:00

Boxscore

Australia	52–56	Turkey
Scoring by quarter: 9–7, 15–17, 10–18, 18–14
Pts: Gak 10; Rebs: Gak 10; Asts: Daniels 7		Pts: Mutaf 12; Rebs: Haltalı 10; Asts: Mutaf, Bona 2

Olympic Sports Centre, Riga
Attendance: 14
Referees: Grant Todey (USA), Gvidas Gedvilas (LTU), Virginia Peruchini (ARG)

=== Seventh place game ===
11 July 2021
10:00

Boxscore

Senegal	75–67	Argentina
Scoring by quarter: 18–19, 17–16, 25–12, 15–20
Pts: Diop 23; Rebs: Diop 15; Asts: Diop 5		Pts: Corbalan 18; Rebs: Díaz, Fernández 6 Asts: Fernández 4

Arena Riga, Riga
Attendance: 20
Referees: Carlos Peralta (ECU), Nathaniel Saunders (CAN), Ryan Jones (NZL)

=== Fifth place game ===
11 July 2021
13:00

Boxscore

Spain	86–81 (OT)	Lithuania
Scoring by quarter: 23–17, 10–17, 17–18, 20–18, Overtime: 16–11
Pts: Domínguez 28; Rebs: Domènech 17; Asts: Ferrando 8		Pts: Tubelis 20; Rebs: Tubelis 15; Asts: Marčiulionis, Tubelis 4

Arena Riga, Riga
Attendance: 60
Referees: Kerem Baki (TUR), Martin Vulić (CRO), Andrada Csender (ROU)

=== Third place game ===
11 July 2021
16:00

Boxscore

Canada	101–92	Serbia
Scoring by quarter: 33–22, 17–32, 24–20, 27–18
Pts: Mathurin 31; Rebs: Edey 12; Asts: Nembhard 10		Pts: Mušikić 25; Rebs: Joksimović 7 Asts: Petrović 7

Arena Riga, Riga
Attendance: 30
Referees: Andris Aunkrogers (LAT), Andreia Silva (BRA), Daigo Urushima (JPN)

=== Final ===
11 July 2021
19:00

Boxscore

United States	83–81	France
Scoring by quarter: 21–19, 16–23, 22–22, 24–17
Pts: Ivey 16; Rebs: Chandler 7 Asts: Miles Jr. 6		Pts: Wembanyama 22; Rebs: Wembanyama 8 Asts: Strazel 8

Arena Riga, Riga
Attendance: 800
Referees: Julio Anaya (PAN), Wojciech Liszka (POL), Maripier Malo (CAN)

== Final standings ==
Rank	Team	Record
1st place, gold medalist(s)	United States	7–0
2nd place, silver medalist(s)	France	5–2
3rd place, bronze medalist(s)	Canada	6–1
4th	Serbia	5–2
5th	Spain	5–2
6th	Lithuania	4–3
7th	Senegal	3–4
8th	Argentina	3–4
9th	Turkey	5–2
10th	Australia	3–4
11th	Latvia	3–4
12th	Iran	2–5
13th	Mali	2–5
14th	Puerto Rico	2–5
15th	South Korea	1–6
16th	Japan	0–7

== Statistics and awards ==
=== Statistical leaders ===
==== Players ====
Points

Name	PPG
(South Korea) Yeo Jun-seok	25.6
(Spain) Rubén Domínguez	18.7
(Serbia) Nikola Jović	18.1
(Canada) Caleb Houstan	17.0
(Lithuania) Ąžuolas Tubelis	16.6

Rebounds

Name	RPG
(Canada) Zach Edey	14.1
(South Korea) Yeo Jun-seok	10.6
(Senegal) Khalifa Diop	9.4
(Lithuania) Ąžuolas Tubelis	8.9
(Mali) Oumar Ballo	8.9

Assists

Name	APG
(Canada) Ryan Nembhard	6.7
(France) Matthew Strazel	6.7
(Australia) Dyson Daniels	5.0
(Lithuania) Augustas Marčiulionis	4.7
(France) Jayson Tchicamboud	4.6
(Japan) John Harper Jr.	4.6
(Serbia) Aleksa Kovačević	4.6
(Spain) Guillem Ferrando	4.6

Blocks

Name	BPG
(France) Victor Wembanyama	4.7
(Mali) Oumar Ballo	2.9
(United States) Chet Holmgren	2.7
(Canada) Zach Edey	2.3
(Turkey) Adem Bona	1.9

Steals

Name	SPG
(Lithuania) Ąžuolas Tubelis	2.4
(Australia) Dyson Daniels	2.3
(Canada) Caleb Houstan	2.3
(Spain) Millán Jiménez	2.3
(Argentina) Gonzalo Corbalán	2.1
(South Korea) Yeo Jun-seok	2.1

Efficiency

Name	EFFPG
(South Korea) Yeo Jun-seok	24.7
(Canada) Zach Edey	23.3
(Serbia) Nikola Jović	20.7
(Senegal) Khalifa Diop	19.6
(United States) Chet Holmgren	19.3

==== Teams ====
Points

Team	PPG
United States	95.0
Canada	88.4
Lithuania	86.7
France	84.4
Serbia	83.1

Rebounds

Team	RPG
Canada	52.0
Mali	51.7
United States	50.1
France	46.3
Senegal	45.9

Assists

Team	APG
United States	25.3
Serbia	21.9
France	20.9
Lithuania	19.9
Spain	19.4
Turkey	19.4

Blocks

Team	BPG
United States	7.6
France	6.6
Senegal	6.1
Mali	5.4
Serbia	4.4

Steals

Team	SPG
Argentina	11.3
Australia	10.7
Puerto Rico	10.4
United States	10.4
France	10.0

Efficiency

Team	EFF
United States	125.3
France	105.1
Serbia	98.4
Lithuania	96.3
Canada	96.1

=== Awards ===
The awards were announced on 11 July 2021.

All-Star Team
Guards	Forwards	Center
(Serbia) Nikola Jović (United States) Jaden Ivey	(France) Victor Wembanyama (United States) Chet Holmgren	(Canada) Zach Edey
MVP: (United States) Chet Holmgren
