= Altiri Chiba =

- Conference: East
- Division: First
- Leagues: B.LEAGUE PREMIER
- Founded: 2020; 6 years ago
- Arena: Chiba Port Arena
- Location: Chiba, Chiba
- Head coach: Andrej Lemanis
- Ownership: Hulic Co., Ltd.
- Championships: 1 B.League(B2)
- Conference titles: 3 B.League(B2) Eastern Conference
- Website: altiri.jp
| Home | Away |

Altiri Chiba is a Japanese professional basketball team based in Chiba. The team competes in the B.League Premier, the highest division of the B.League, as a member of the Eastern Conference. The team plays its home games at Chiba Port Arena.

== Domestic ==
- B.League(B2)
  - Champions (1): 2024–25
  - Conference Champions (3): 2022-23,2023-24,2024-25

== Coaches ==
- Andrej Lemanis

== Roster ==
Altiri Chiba roster
Players
Coaches

| Pos. | No. | Nat. | Name | Ht. | Age |
|---|---|---|---|---|---|
| F | 0 | (Japan) | Takaaki Kida | 1.88 m (6 ft 2 in) | 31 – 16 July 1995 |
| PF | 1 | (United States) | Alex Davis | 2.06 m (6 ft 9 in) | 34 – 28 January 1992 |
| SG | 2 | (United States) | D.J. Newbill | 1.93 m (6 ft 4 in) | 34 – 22 May 1992 |
| PG | 3 | (Japan) | Kotetsu Kurokawa | 1.77 m (5 ft 10 in) | 25 – 8 April 2001 |
| PF | 5 | (Japan) | Blake Aoki | 2.04 m (6 ft 8 in) | 32 – 13 November 1993 |
| PF | 7 | (United States) | Dererk Pardon | 2.03 m (6 ft 8 in) | 30 – 1 October 1996 |
| SG | 8 | (Japan) | Tomoya Hasegawa | 1.85 m (6 ft 1 in) | 37 – 22 April 1989 |
| PG | 9 | (Japan) | Seiya Ando | 1.81 m (5 ft 11 in) | 34 – 15 July 1992 |
| G | 11 | (Japan) | Kei Sugimoto | 1.83 m (6 ft 0 in) | 34 – 9 July 1992 |
| PF | 21 | (United States) | Brandon Ashley (injured) | 2.06 m (6 ft 9 in) | 32 – 15 July 1994 |
| SF | 27 | (Japan) | Kumagae Naoya | 1.95 m (6 ft 5 in) | 35 – 16 November 1990 |
| C | 30 | (Philippines) | Kai Sotto | 2.20 m (7 ft 3 in) | 24 – 11 May 2002 |
| PF | 33 | (Japan) | Luke Evans (injured) | 2.03 m (6 ft 8 in) | 35 – 16 March 1991 |
| PF | 42 | (Japan) | Leon Watanabe | 2.06 m (6 ft 9 in) | 20 – 2 April 2006 |

Head coach

(Australia) Andrej Lemanis

Assistant coach(es)

(Japan) Kenshi Takizawa
(Japan) Shuto Kawachi
(Japan) Takashiro Kurihara
(Japan) Yusuke Ishii

Legend

- (C) Team captain
- Injured

== Notable players ==
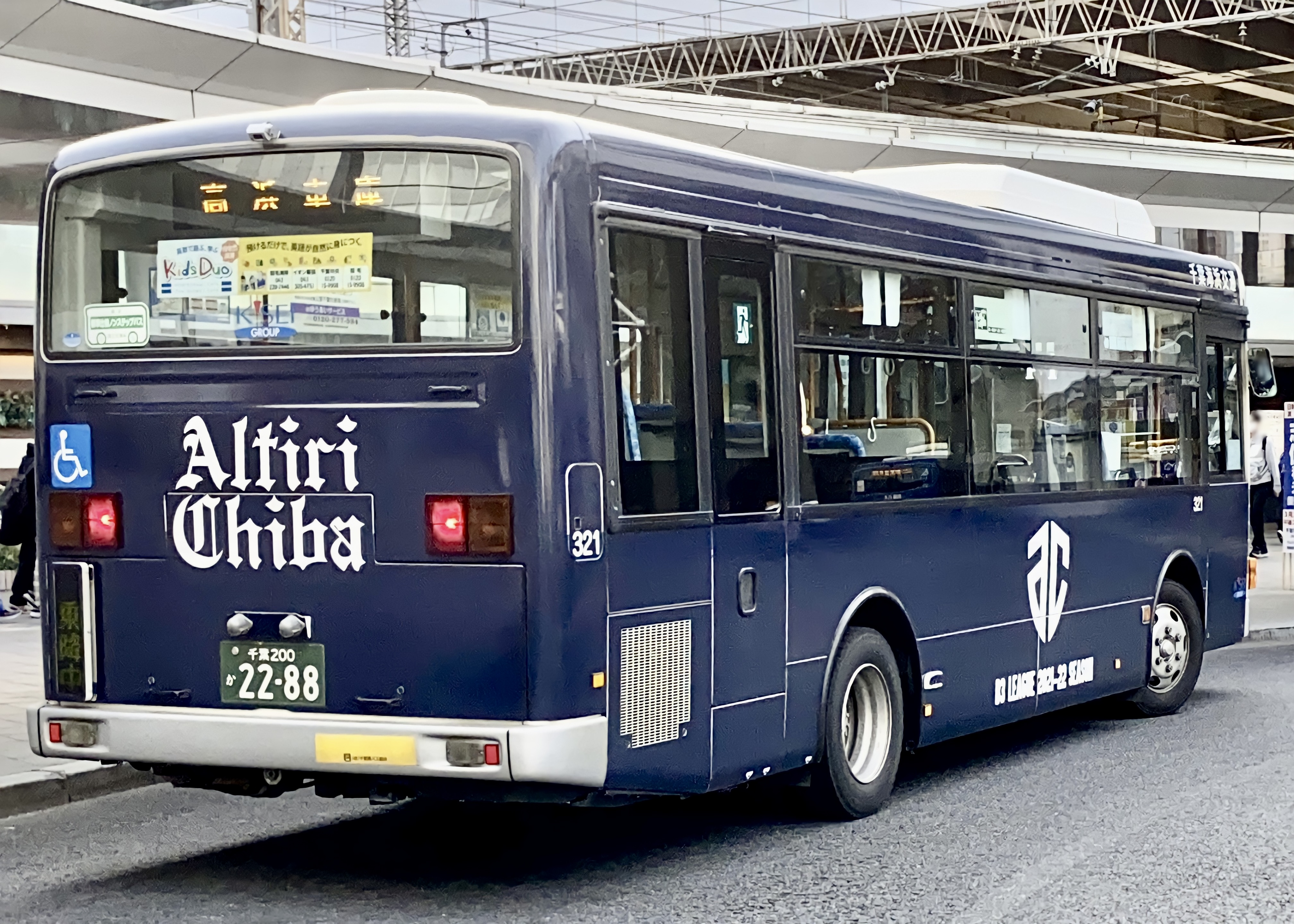
Bus advertising

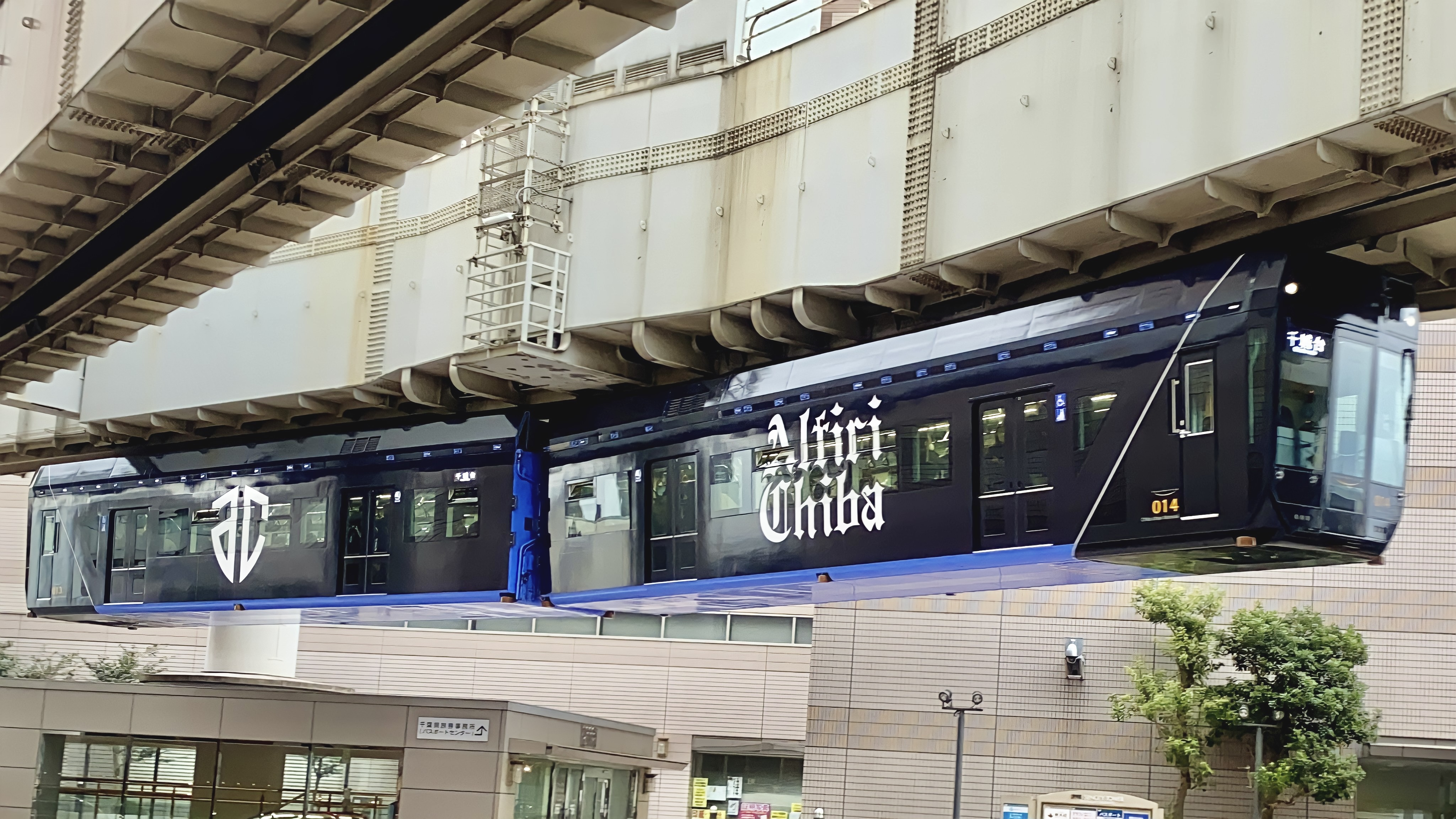
Chiba Urban Monorail

- (Japan) Daisuke Kobayashi
- (United States) Kevin Kotzur
- (United States) Leo Lyons
- (Japan) Yusuke Okada
- (Japan) Yuto Otsuka
- (United States) Evan Ravenel
- (United States) Brandon Ashley
- (United States) Alex Davis
- (United States) Trey Porter
- (United States) Dererk Pardon
- (United States) D.J. Newbill
- (Japan) Seiya Ando

== Arenas ==
- Chiba Port Arena

== Practice facilities ==
They practice at the 「HURIC PERFORMANCE CENTER」 in Mihama-ku.

== Seasons ==
=== B.League ===
Key
| Finish | Final position in league or division standings |
| MVP | Most Valuable Player |

| League champions | Division champions | Playoff berth |

| Season | League | Division | Regular season | | | | | Playoffs | Awards |
| Season | League | Division | Finish (Note: The Finish column lists regular season results and excludes postseason play.) | W (Note: The Wins and Losses columns list regular season results and exclude any postseason play. Regular and postseason records are combined only below the table.) | L | Pct | GB | Playoffs | Awards |
|---|---|---|---|---|---|---|---|---|---|
Altiri Chiba
| 2021–22 | B3 | — | 2nd | 37 | 7 | .841 | 6 | Won B2 Promotion Playoff (Tryhoop) | — |
| 2022–23 | B2 | East | 1st | 47 | 13 | .783 | — | Won B2 quarterfinals (Wat's) 2–0; Lost B2 semifinals (Velca) 1–2 | — |
| 2023–24 | B2 | East | 1st | 56 | 4 | .933 | — | Won B2 quarterfinals (Veltex) 2–0; Lost B2 semifinals (Alphas) 0–2 | Brandon Ashley (B2 MVP) |
| 2024–25 | B2 | East | 1st | 57 | 3 | .950 | — | Won B2 quarterfinals (Volters) 2–0; Won B2 semifinals (Brave Warriors) 2–0; B2 finals (Grouses) 1–1 | Brandon Ashley (B2 MVP) |
| 2025–26 | B1 | East | 11th | 19 | 41 | .317 | 26 | — | — |
| 2026-27 | Premier | East | | | | – | | | |
