= Ren Kanechika =

Japanese basketball player (born 2003)

No. 12 – Chiba Jets
- Position: Small forward
- League: B.Premier

Personal information
- Born: March 11, 2003 (age 23) Osaka, Japan
- Listed height: 197 cm (6 ft 6 in)
- Listed weight: 98 kg (216 lb)

Career information
- College: Tokai University
- Playing career: 2023–present
Medals
Men's basketball
Representing Japan
Asian Games
Silver medal – second place	2026 Asian Games	Team

Ren Kanechika (Japanese: 金近 廉, born 11 March 2003) is a Japanese professional basketball player for the Chiba Jets of the B.League and the Japan men's national basketball team. A small forward, he played college basketball at Tokai University before leaving the university and joining the Chiba Jets as a practice player in 2023.

== Early life and college career ==
Kanechika was born in Osaka Prefecture, Japan, on 11 March 2003. He attended Hokuyo High School before enrolling at Tokai University.

While at university, Kanechika represented Japan at youth level. He played at the 2021 FIBA Under-19 Basketball World Cup, averaging 7.7 points, 1.1 rebounds and 1.0 assist per game in seven appearances.

In April 2023, Kanechika left Tokai University and joined the Chiba Jets as a practice player. He subsequently signed a professional contract with the club and made his B.League debut during the 2023–24 season.

== Professional career ==
Kanechika began his professional career with the Chiba Jets in the B.League during the 2023–24 season. He appeared in 57 regular-season games, averaging 6.2 points, 1.6 rebounds and 1.0 assist per game. He also helped the club win the Emperor's Cup and the East Asia Super League during the season.

At the end of the 2023–24 season, Kanechika received the B.League Rookie of the Year award.

He continued with the Chiba Jets for the 2024–25 and 2025–26 seasons and remained with the club for the inaugural 2026–27 B.Premier season. In May 2026, the Chiba Jets announced that his contract had been extended for the 2026–27 season.

== International career ==
Kanechika represented Japan at the 2021 FIBA Under-19 Basketball World Cup. He made his senior national-team debut in the 2023 FIBA Basketball World Cup Asian Qualifiers, scoring 20 points against Iran in February 2023. He averaged 10 points, 1 rebound and 1.5 assists in his two appearances during the qualifying window.

He was selected for Japan's squad at the 2025 FIBA Asia Cup, where he averaged 2.8 points and 2.3 rebounds in four games.

At the 2026 Asian Games, held in Aichi and Nagoya, Kanechika was part of the Japan men's team that won the silver medal. Japan reached the men's basketball final for the first time in 64 years before losing to South Korea. Kanechika started the final and scored 13 points. In the semifinal against China, he led Japan with 19 points, including four three-point field goals, as Japan reached the final.
