= Kotetsu Kurokawa =

Japanese basketball player (born 2003)

Kotetsu Kurokawa 黒川虎徹
No. 3 – Altiri Chiba
- Position: Point guard
- League: B.League

Personal information
- Born: February 9, 2003 (age 23) Nagasaki, Japan
- Listed height: 175 cm (5 ft 9 in)
- Listed weight: 76 kg (168 lb)

Career information
- College: Tokai
- Playing career: 2024–present

Career history
- 2024–: Altiri Chiba

Career highlights
- B2 champions (2025); B2 Finals MVP (2025)
Medals
Men's basketball
Representing Japan
Asian Games
Silver medal – second place	2026 Aichi–Nagoya	Team

Kotetsu Kurokawa (黒川虎徹, Kurokawa Kotetsu) is a Japanese basketball player who plays for the Altiri Chiba of the B.League.

== Early life ==
Kotetsu Kurokawa was born in the Nagasaki Prefecture on February 9, 2003.

== Career ==
Kurokawa, who had been a student at Tokai University since 2019, joined the Altiri Chiba of the B.League's second division (B2) as a special designated player in January 2024 for the 2023–24 season.

In the 2024–25 B2 Finals, Altiri Chiba faced the Toyama Grouses in a best-of-three series. The teams split the first two games, but the decisive third game was cancelled, resulting in both teams being declared co-champions and promoted to B1. Kurokawa was named Finals MVP.

== National team ==
Kurokawa made his debut for the Japan national team in August 2026, coming off the bench in Japan's 67–65 defeat to Mongolia at the Nippon Life Cup.. At the 2026 Asian Games, held in Japan, Kurokawa helped Japan reach the final, where they lost to South Korea, earning a silver medal.
