= Quaden Bayles =

Australian actor (born 2010)

- Born: 13 December 2010 (age 15); Queensland, Australia
- Occupation: Actor
- Years active: 2020–present
- Family: Yarraka Bayles (mother); Tiga Bayles (maternal grandfather); Biwali Bayles (cousin); James Roberts (uncle)

Quaden Bayles (born 13 December 2010) is an Australian actor. He appeared in the films Three Thousand Years of Longing and Furiosa: A Mad Max Saga. A video of Bayles in emotional distress after being bullied at school due to his dwarfism went viral in February 2020.

== Life and career ==
Quaden Bayles was born on 13 December 2010 to father Quaden Georgetown and mother Yarraka Bayles. He has two older sisters and an older brother. He is a Murri boy. Yarraka's father is broadcaster and activist Tiga Bayles. Bayles' cousin is basketball player Biwali Bayles, and his uncle is rugby league footballer James Roberts. Quaden's parents separated when he was two and a half years old.

Bayles has achondroplasia, the most common form of dwarfism. As a result of his condition, Bayles has had major operations, and his health complications include early onset arthritis and requiring a machine to provide oxygen while he sleeps. For almost the entire first year of his life, his mother Yarraka was in denial about Bayles' dwarfism, and she later suffered from postnatal depression. After coming to terms with Quaden's dwarfism, she began documenting his life to raise awareness about dwarfism. She started the Stand Tall 4 Dwarfism campaign, and Bayles was the subject of an episode of Living Black in 2015. Following the death of his grandfather in 2016, Bayles started exhibiting suicidal tendencies. He first tried to commit suicide when he was six years old and made five more attempts in the following two years. Bayles started being bullied at school when he was seven years old.

In February 2020, when he was nine years old, Bayles made headlines after his mother posted a video of him online, showing him extremely upset and saying that he wanted to die, due to bullying at Carina State School related to his dwarfism. The video went viral, and although initially it brought a lot of sympathy, it also attracted scepticism and hate on social media. A video message by Bayles was played at the disability royal commission in October 2020, and his mother called for a new law to combat bullying in schools. As of 2023, the boy had got the "most expensive royal independent investigation" into the harsh reality of people with a disability in order to change the public perception of them. It led to "32 public hearings, 1,785 private sessions, almost 8,000 submissions, 28 research reports and about $600 million dollars" from the Disability Royal Commission.

Bayles' viral video came to the attention of director George Miller, who cast him in the 2022 film Three Thousand Years of Longing and the 2024 film Furiosa: A Mad Max Saga. Two episodes of Australian Story about Bayles aired in October 2020 and June 2024.

== Filmography ==
- 2022: Three Thousand Years of Longing – Quick Change Boy
- 2024: Furiosa: A Mad Max Saga – War Pup
