= Ibu Yamazaki =

Japanese basketball player (born 2003)

No. 21 – Sun Rockers Shibuya
- Position: Small forward
- League: B.League

Personal information
- Born: 10 July 2003 (age 23) Matsudo, Chiba Prefecture, Japan
- Listed height: 201 cm (6 ft 7 in)
- Listed weight: 98 kg (216 lb)

Career information
- College: University of Northern Colorado
- Playing career: 2026–present
Medals
Men's basketball
Representing Japan
Asian Games
Silver medal – second place	2026 Aichi-Nagoya	Men's tournament

Ibu Yamazaki (Japanese: 山﨑 一渉; born 10 July 2003) is a Japanese professional basketball player for Sun Rockers Shibuya of the B.League. He plays as a small forward. Yamazaki represented Japan at the 2021 FIBA Under-19 Basketball World Cup and won a silver medal at the men's tournament of the 2026 Asian Games.

== Early life and education ==
Yamazaki was born in Matsudo, Chiba Prefecture, and attended Meisei High School in Sendai, Miyagi Prefecture. During his high school career, he helped Meisei win the Winter Cup in 2020, making the game-winning shot in the final. He later moved to the United States to play college basketball.

== College career ==
Yamazaki represented Japan at the 2021 FIBA Under-19 Basketball World Cup before beginning his college career in the United States. At the tournament, he averaged 14.6 points, 4.0 rebounds and 1.1 assists per game over seven games, including 32 points against South Korea.

Yamazaki joined Radford University in 2022. As a freshman in the 2022–23 season, he appeared in 33 games and averaged 2.2 points and 1.2 rebounds per game. He missed the 2023–24 season because of injury and returned to play in 2024–25, averaging 5.9 points and 2.4 rebounds per game.

For the 2025–26 season, Yamazaki transferred to the University of Northern Colorado. He started 30 of 32 games and averaged 9.9 points, 3.6 rebounds and 0.8 assists per game, while shooting 36.2% from three-point range and 90.9% from the free-throw line.

== Professional career ==
In 2026, Yamazaki was selected first overall in the inaugural B.League player draft by Sun Rockers Shibuya. He joined the club for the 2026–27 season and became one of the team's young Japanese forwards.

== International career ==
Yamazaki represented Japan at the 2021 FIBA Under-19 Basketball World Cup, where he was one of the team's leading scorers. He subsequently continued to be considered for Japan's senior national-team program.

In 2026, Yamazaki was selected for Japan's men's basketball team for the 2026 Asian Games in Aichi-Nagoya. During the tournament, he contributed as a forward on both ends of the court. In Japan's group-stage game against Saudi Arabia, he scored 12 points and recorded five steals. In the semifinal against China, Yamazaki made several three-point shots and contributed defensively as Japan advanced to the final. He emphasized the team's defensive rebounding and collective defense against China's larger lineup. Japan faced South Korea in the final. Yamazaki scored a buzzer-beating basket at the end of the opening quarter, but Japan lost the final and finished with the silver medal. The result was Japan's first men's Asian Games basketball medal in 64 years. Yamazaki finished the tournament with 12 successful three-point attempts from 27 attempts and was among Japan's leading contributors during its run to the silver medal.
