= Furkan Haltalı =

Turkish basketball player (born 2002)

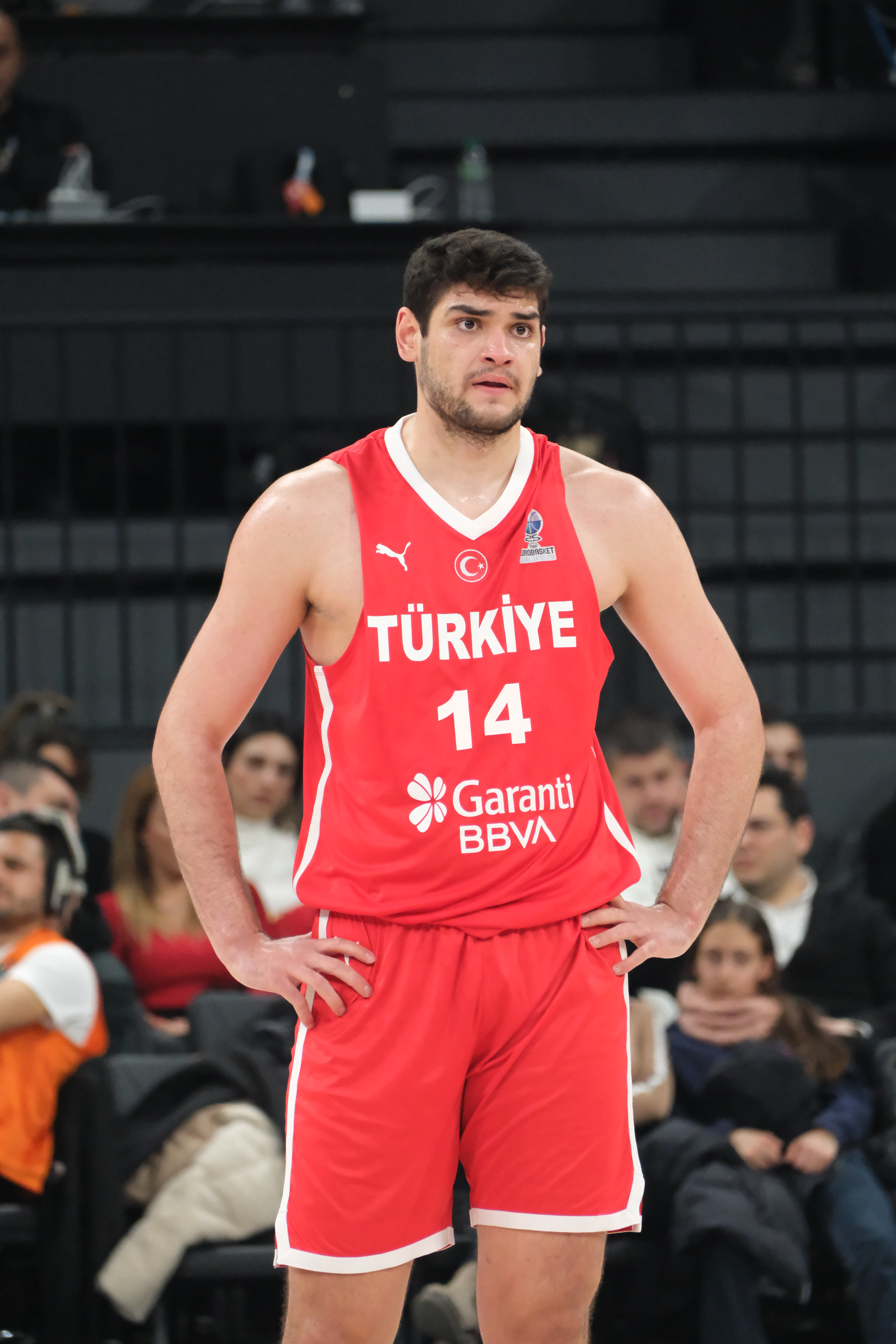
- Haltalı with the Turkey national team in 2025

No. 14 – Bahçeşehir Koleji
- Position: Center
- League: Basketbol Süper Ligi

Personal information
- Born: December 2, 2002 (age 23) Selçuklu, Konya, Turkey
- Listed height: 6 ft 11 in (2.11 m)
- Listed weight: 210 lb (95 kg)

Career information
- Playing career: 2017–present

Career history
- 2017–2019: Bandırma Kırmızı
- 2019–2020: Teksüt Bandırma
- 2020–2023: Beşiktaş Icrypex
- 2022–2023: → Anadolu Efes
- 2023–2024: Pınar Karşıyaka
- 2024–present: Bahçeşehir Koleji

Career highlights
- Turkish League champion (2023)

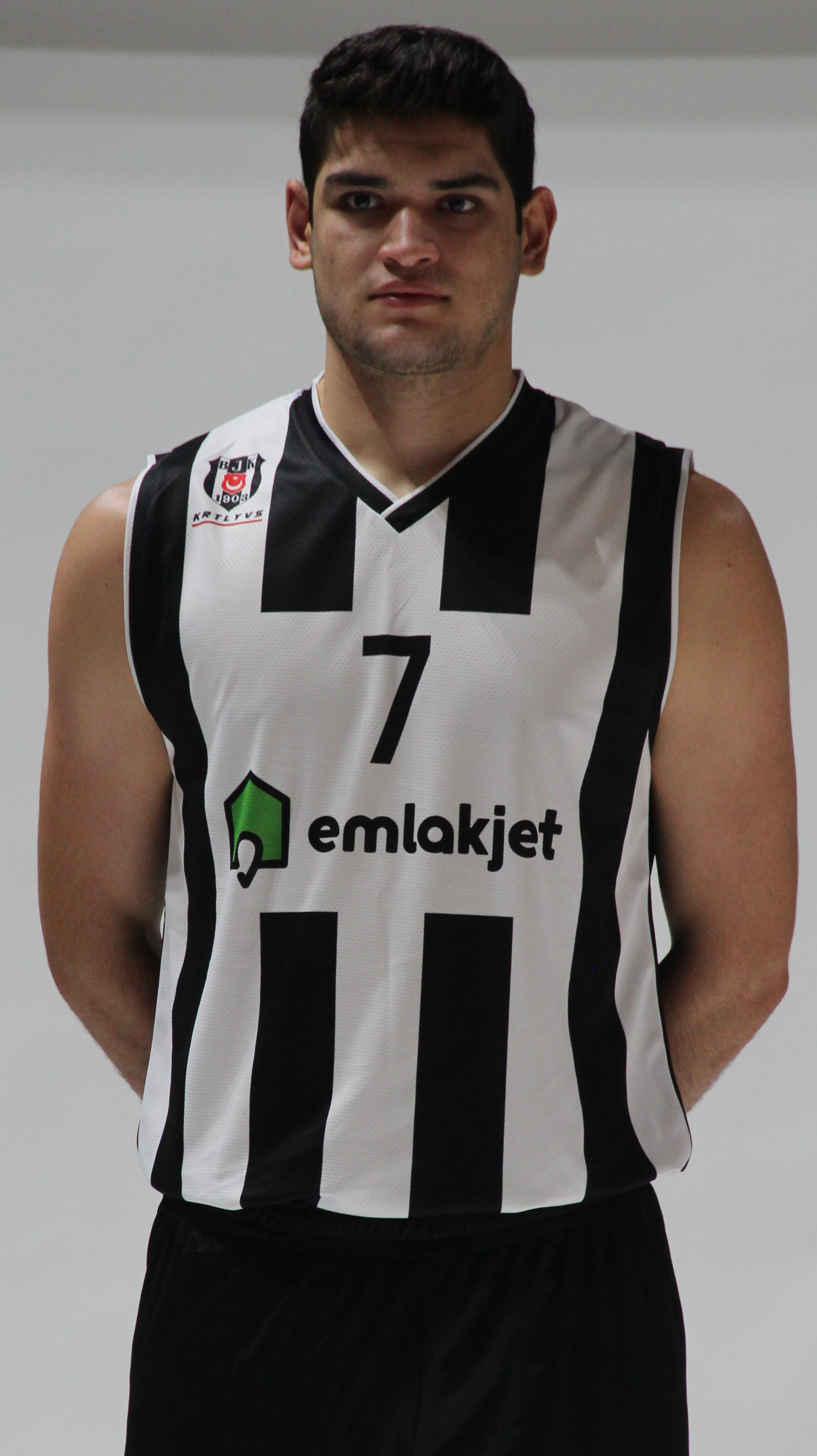

Furkan Haltalı (born December 2, 2002) is a Turkish professional basketball player who plays as a center for Bahçeşehir Koleji of the Basketbol Süper Ligi (BSL).

== Professional career ==
=== Years in Bandırma (2016–2020) ===
Furkan Haltalı started his professional career at Bandırma Kırmızı in 2017–18 season and stayed with this club two seasons.

=== Beşiktaş (2020–2023) ===
On August 8, 2020, he signed with Beşiktaş Icrypex of the Basketbol Süper Ligi (BSL).

=== Loan to Anadolu Efes (2022–2023) ===
On December 27, 2022, he was loaned to Anadolu Efes of the Basketbol Süper Ligi (BSL), until the end of season, in exchange for Egemen Güven and Ömercan İlyasoğlu. His loan spell ended on June 22, 2023.

=== Pınar Karşıyaka (2023–2024) ===
On June 21, 2023, he signed with Pınar Karşıyaka of the Basketbol Süper Ligi (BSL).

=== Bahçeşehir Koleji (2024–present) ===
On June 1, 2024, he signed with Bahçeşehir Koleji of the Basketbol Süper Ligi (BSL).
