= Atsuya Ogawa =

Japanese basketball player (born 2002)

No. 7 – Utsunomiya Brex
- Position: Point guard
- League: B.League

Personal information
- Born: 24 June 2002 (age 24) Niigata Prefecture, Japan
- Listed height: 190 cm (6 ft 3 in)
- Listed weight: 85 kg (187 lb)

Career information
- College: Tsukuba University
- Playing career: 2022–present
Medals
Men's basketball
Representing Japan
Asian Games
Silver medal – second place	2026 Aichi-Nagoya	Men's tournament

Atsuya Ogawa (Japanese: 小川 敦也; born 24 June 2002) is a Japanese professional basketball player for Utsunomiya Brex of the B.League. He plays as a point guard and has represented Japan at youth and senior international level. Ogawa won a silver medal with Japan in the men's tournament at the 2026 Asian Games.

== Early life and education ==
Ogawa was born in Niigata Prefecture, Japan. He attended Rakunan High School in Kyoto before enrolling at Tsukuba University. He played as a point guard and developed into one of the leading young players in Japanese university basketball.

== College career ==
In 2021, Ogawa received the Outstanding Player Award at the 61st Kanto University Basketball Rookie Tournament. During the same year, he represented Japan at the 2021 FIBA Under-19 Basketball World Cup in Latvia. He appeared in all seven of Japan's games, averaging 5.6 points, 2.3 rebounds and 2.0 assists per game.

Ogawa joined Utsunomiya Brex as a specially designated player during the 2022–23 season while studying at Tsukuba University. He made his B.League debut during the season and became one of the university players to gain regular professional experience.

At the 75th All-Japan University Basketball Championship in 2023, Ogawa helped Tsukuba University reach third place. He was named to the tournament's Best Five, won the assists title and received the Most Impressive Player award.

== Professional career ==
In January 2023, Ogawa left the Tsukuba University basketball team and signed a professional contract with Utsunomiya Brex for the 2023–24 season. He became a full-time professional while still in his third year of university.

During the 2024–25 B.League season, Ogawa averaged 3.9 points, 1.3 rebounds and 1.5 assists per game for Utsunomiya. He also appeared in the club's run to the B.League championship, contributing as a young point guard.

Ogawa also played for Utsunomiya in the Basketball Champions League Asia. In the 2025 competition, he appeared in four games and averaged 3.5 points, 1.0 rebound and 2.3 assists per game.

== International career ==
Ogawa represented Japan at youth level at the 2021 FIBA Under-19 Basketball World Cup and later competed at the FISU World University Games in Chengdu in 2023.

He was selected for Japan's senior national team in 2026 and was included in the squad for the 2026 Asian Games in Aichi-Nagoya. He was one of the team's point guards alongside other young Japanese players. Ahead of the Asian Games, Ogawa said that his experience with the national team had increased his confidence and his ability to create plays and initiate attacks. He also said that he wanted to take greater responsibility for leading the team on court. At the 2026 Asian Games, Ogawa started for Japan during the men's tournament, including the quarterfinal victory over Chinese Taipei. Japan progressed to the gold-medal game against South Korea. Japan lost the final to South Korea and finished with the silver medal. The result gave Ogawa his first medal at a major senior international competition and made him an Asian Games silver medallist.
