= Daisuke Kobayashi (basketball) =

Japanese basketball player (born 1987)

Daisuke Kobayashi 小林大祐
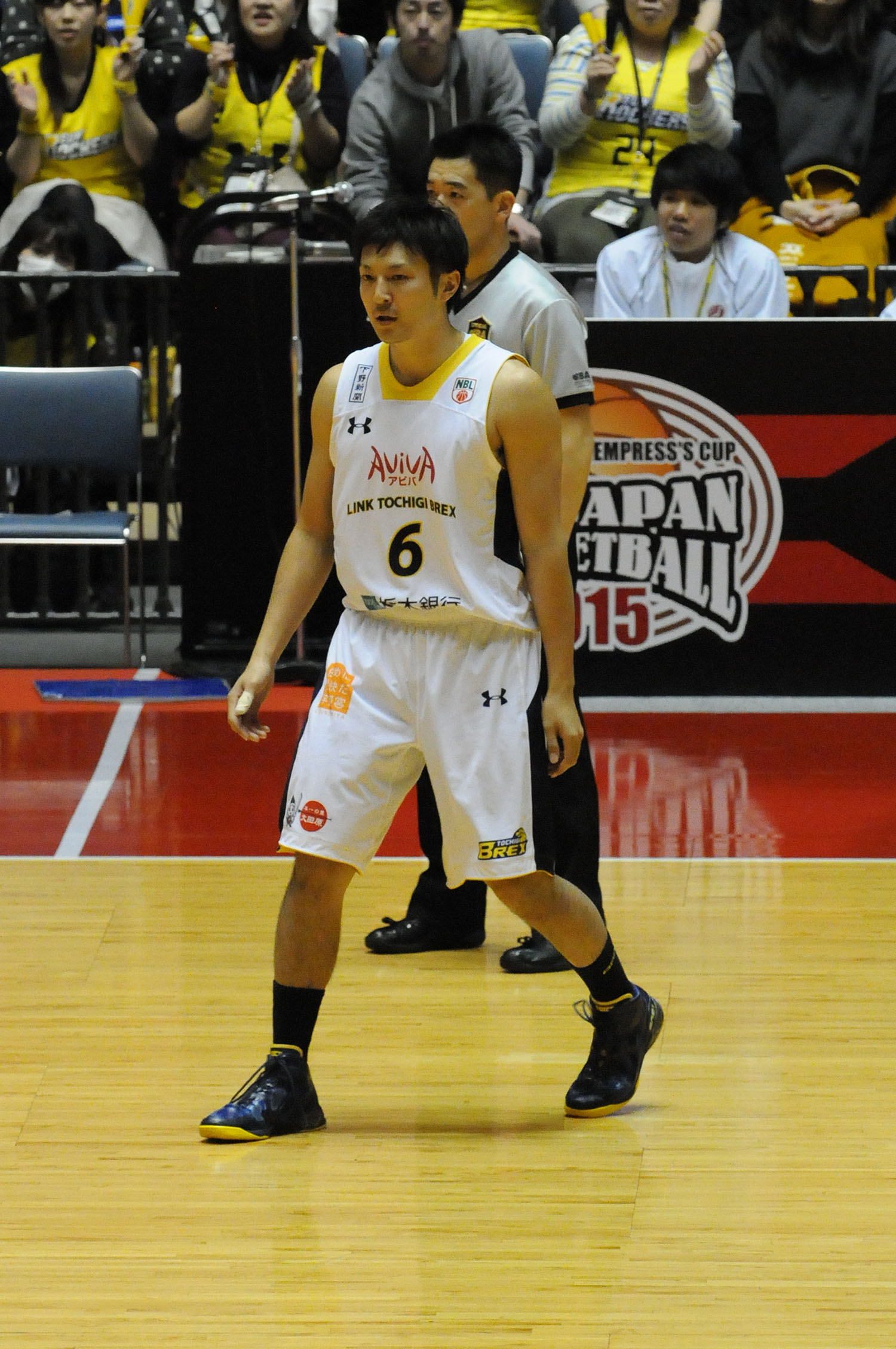
- Kobayashi in 2015

No. 6 – Altiri Chiba
- Position: Shooting guard
- League: B.League, FIBA 3X3

Personal information
- Born: June 24, 1987 (age 39) Fukuoka, Fukuoka
- Listed height: 6 ft 3 in (1.91 m)
- Listed weight: 194 lb (88 kg)

Career information
- High school: Fukuoka University Ohori High School (Chūō-ku, Fukuoka)
- College: Keio University
- Playing career: 2010–present

Career history
- 2010-2014: Hitachi Sunrockers
- 2014-2016: Tochigi Brex
- 2016-2019: Rizing Zephyr Fukuoka
- 2019-2021: Ibaraki Robots
- 2021-present: Altiri Chiba

Career highlights
- JBL Rookie of the Year (2010-11); B3 Best Five (2016-17)

Daisuke Kobayashi (小林大祐, Kobayashi Daisuke; born June 24, 1987) is a Japanese professional basketball player who plays for Altiri Chiba of the B.League in Japan. He also plays for Japan men's national 3x3 team.

== Awards and honors ==
- 3x3 Central Europe Tour 2019 - Chance 3x3 Tour Jindřichův Hradec Champions

== Non-FIBA Events statistics ==
| Year | Team | GP | GS | MPG | FG% | 3P% | FT% | RPG | APG | SPG | BPG | PPG |
|---|---|---|---|---|---|---|---|---|---|---|---|---|
| 2011 | Universiade Japan | 8 | | 15.48 | .397 | .294 | .750 | 1.9 | 0.6 | 1.0 | 0.0 | 9.5 |

== Career statistics ==
Legend
| GP | Games played | GS | Games started | MPG | Minutes per game |
| FG% | Field goal percentage | 3P% | 3-point field goal percentage | FT% | Free throw percentage |
| RPG | Rebounds per game | APG | Assists per game | SPG | Steals per game |
| BPG | Blocks per game | PPG | Points per game | **Bold** | Career high |

=== Regular season ===
| Year | Team | GP | GS | MPG | FG% | 3P% | FT% | RPG | APG | SPG | BPG | PPG |
|---|---|---|---|---|---|---|---|---|---|---|---|---|
| 2010-11 | Hitachi | 36 | | 29.2 | .383 | .358 | .745 | 2.1 | 1.3 | 0.6 | 0.1 | 12.0 |
| 2011-12 | Hitachi | 25 | 24 | 27.4 | .427 | .315 | .714 | 2.8 | 1.2 | 0.9 | 0.1 | 12.3 |
| 2012-13 | Hitachi | 34 | 34 | 24.5 | .405 | .373 | .708 | 1.7 | 1.4 | 0.6 | 0.1 | 11.5 |
| 2013-14 | Hitachi | 48 | 12 | 19.5 | .353 | .320 | .750 | 1.7 | 1.4 | 0.5 | 0.1 | 7.5 |
| 2014-15 | Tochigi | 53 | 2 | 8.9 | .432 | .333 | .719 | 0.6 | 0.6 | 0.2 | 0.0 | 4.2 |
| 2015-16 | Tochigi | 38 | | 6.9 | .393 | .281 | .700 | 0.6 | 0.2 | 0. | 0.0 | 2.9 |
| 2016-17 | Fukuoka | 44 | 42 | 25.8 | .396 | .348 | .759 | 3.5 | 2.2 | 0.8 | 0.2 | 11.7 |
| 2017-18 | Fukuoka | 31 | 27 | 25.5 | .459 | .415 | .733 | 2.5 | 3.1 | 1.3 | 0.1 | 14.7 |
| 2018-19 | Fukuoka | 50 | 18 | 17.2 | .334 | .304 | .712 | 1.9 | 1.6 | 0.8 | 0.1 | 6.5 |

=== Playoffs ===
| Year | Team | GP | GS | MPG | FG% | 3P% | FT% | RPG | APG | SPG | BPG | PPG |
|---|---|---|---|---|---|---|---|---|---|---|---|---|
| 2017-18 | Fukuoka | 5 | 5 | 22.11 | .418 | .379 | .800 | 2.4 | 1.6 | 0.4 | 0.2 | 13.8 |

=== Early cup games ===
| Year | Team | GP | GS | MPG | FG% | 3P% | FT% | RPG | APG | SPG | BPG | PPG |
|---|---|---|---|---|---|---|---|---|---|---|---|---|
| 2018 | Fukuoka | 2 | 2 | 30.09 | .417 | .250 | .750 | 5.0 | 4.5 | 2.0 | 0 | 14.5 |
