= Alex Starling =

American-Australian basketball player (born 1989)

No. 32 – Woodville Warriors
- Position: Forward
- League: NBL1 Central

Personal information
- Born: February 6, 1989 (age 37) Miami, Florida, U.S.
- Listed height: 199 cm (6 ft 6 in)
- Listed weight: 99 kg (218 lb)

Career information
- High school: Killian (Miami, Florida)
- College: Palm Beach State (2007–2008); Bethune–Cookman (2008–2011)
- NBA draft: 2011: undrafted
- Playing career: 2014–present

Career history
- 2014: Woodville Warriors
- 2015: Warrnambool Seahawks
- 2016: Southern Tigers
- 2017–2019: North Adelaide Rockets
- 2021–2024: South Adelaide Panthers
- 2023–2024: Adelaide 36ers
- 2024–2025: Sarawak Cola Warriors
- 2025–2026: Forestville Eagles
- 2027–: Woodville Warriors

Career highlights
- 4× Premier League / NBL1 Central champion (2014, 2016, 2022, 2026); 3× Premier League / NBL1 Central Grand Final MVP (2014, 2022, 2026); 3× Premier League / NBL1 Central MVP (2014, 2018, 2024); 5× Premier League / NBL1 Central All-Star Five (2014, 2016, 2018, 2023, 2024); 6× Premier League / NBL1 Central Best Defensive Player (2017, 2019, 2022–2024, 2026); Big V D1 All-Star Five (2015); Second-team All-MEAC (2011)

Alexander Starling (born February 6, 1989) is an American-Australian professional basketball player for the Woodville Warriors of the NBL1 Central. He played college basketball for Palm Beach State College and the Bethune–Cookman Wildcats before embarking on an Australian rules football career after being identified as an international prospect. He attempted to crack the ranks of the Australian Football League (AFL) between 2011 and 2014 before eventually returning to basketball and making a name for himself in the NBL1 Central in South Australia. He has won four NBL1 Central championships with four different teams and is a three-time league MVP winner. He debuted in the National Basketball League (NBL) in 2023 with the Adelaide 36ers.

== Early life and education ==
Starling was born in Miami, Florida. He grew up in Richmond Heights and attended Leewood Elementary and Richmond Heights Middle School.

Starling attended Miami Killian Senior High School. As a senior in 2006–07, he was named First Team All-Dade, Second Team All State, First Team All-District and Killian High School Male Athlete of the Year. He averaged 20.8 points, 10.6 rebounds and 2.4 assists per game.

== College career ==
Starling played his first season of college basketball for Palm Beach State College, where he averaged 3.7 points and 5.9 rebounds per game in 23 games in 2007–08.

In April 2008, Starling signed a National Letter of Intent with Bethune–Cookman University.

As a sophomore in 2008–09, Starling started in all 33 games he played for the Wildcats and averaged 7.5 points and 7.4 rebounds in 29.0 minutes per game. He scored a season-high 18 points twice, first on debut and again in his seventh game. He had a season-high 15 rebounds in February 2009.

As a junior in 2009–10, Starling again started in all 33 games he played and averaged 9.8 points, 6.5 rebounds, 1.1 assists and 2.0 steals in 30.4 minutes per game. He had a career-high 28 points and 14 rebounds in the third game of the season.

As a senior in 2010–11, Starling again started in all 33 games he played and averaged 10.7 points, 6.7 rebounds 1.4 steals and 1.0 blocks in 31.4 minutes per game. He scored a season-high 19 points in December 2010. He earned second-team All-MEAC honors and helped the Wildcats win their first-ever MEAC championship. In his final home game, he stole an inbound pass and hit a bank shot with two seconds remaining in overtime against Florida A&M that secured Bethune-Cookman's first 20-win season since 1976–77.

In 99 career games for the Wildcats, Starling averaged 9.3 points, 6.9 rebounds and 1.4 steals in 30.3 minutes per game. As of 2018, he was the seventh all-time leading rebounder in Wildcats history.

== Australian rules football ==
In May 2011, Starling was introduced to Australian rules football when the Sydney Swans of the Australian Football League (AFL) identified him as an international prospect. The following month, he attended an AFL Draft Combine in Redondo Beach, California. In August 2011, he travelled to Sydney, Australia, for a three-week testing period.

In January 2012, Starling signed an international scholarship with the Sydney Swans. It was reportedly a two-year, $180,000 contract. The scholarship allowed him to finish his four-year degree in Business Administration at Bethune–Cookman University while also making several trips to Sydney in 2012 to train with the Swans. The plan was for Starling to be recruited to the Swans' senior list as an international rookie in 2013, but a lingering stress fracture in one of his legs saw him part ways with the Swans.

In December 2013, Starling moved to Melbourne to join the Frankston Football Club of the Victorian Football League (VFL). After the deal fell through over the summer, he moved to Adelaide in January 2014 to train with the Port Adelaide Magpies of the South Australian National Football League (SANFL); their parent organisation, the Port Adelaide Football Club of the AFL, was considering Starling for an international rookie spot. After several months training with Port, the club committed its international rookie spot to Irishman Daniel Flynn and wanted Starling to prove himself via the Magpies. Starling declined the offer and instead turned his attention back to basketball.

== Basketball career ==
In early 2014, Starling joined the Woodville Warriors of the South Australian Premier League and also began training with the Adelaide 36ers of the National Basketball League (NBL). With Woodville, he averaged 20.5 points and 10.4 rebounds per game and helped the team win the championship behind his 36 points in the grand final against the West Adelaide Bearcats. He earned grand final MVP, league MVP and All-Star Five honors.

In 2015, Starling played for the Warrnambool Seahawks of the Big V Division One. He averaged 21.6 points and 12.7 rebounds to go with 20 double-doubles and one triple-double. He was named team MVP and earned league All-Star Five honors. He was also a finalist for league MVP and Defensive Player of the Year.

In 2016, Starling returned to the Premier League to play for the Southern Tigers. He helped the Tigers win the championship and earned All-Star Five honors.

Starling joined the North Adelaide Rockets for the 2017 Premier League season and earned Best Defensive Player honors. He returned to the Rockets in 2018 and once again earned league MVP and All-Star Five honors. He averaged 22.4 points, 14.1 rebounds, 2.9 assists and a league-leading 3.6 steals per game. With the Rockets in 2019, he earned Best Defensive Player honors for the second time.

In December 2019, Starling signed with the South Adelaide Panthers for the 2020 season. The Premier League was rebranded as NBL1 Central in 2020, but the 2020 NBL1 season was cancelled due to the COVID-19 pandemic. He had also been touted to make his football debut in 2020 with the Gawler Central Football Club in regional South Australia.

With the Panthers in the 2021 NBL1 season, Starling led the NBL1 Central in rebounds and steals. In 12 games, he averaged 16.5 points, 13.17 rebounds, 3.0 assists and 3.5 steals per game.

In the 2022 NBL1 season, Starling helped the Panthers win the NBL1 Central championship while earning grand final MVP behind his 31 points and 18 rebounds against the Woodville Warriors. He once again earned the league's Best Defensive Player award. In 20 games, he averaged 20.15 points, 12.2 rebounds, 3.15 assists, 2.75 steals and 1.35 blocks per game.

With the Panthers in the 2023 NBL1 season, Starling was the NBL1 Central's rebounding leader with 13.13 per game and once again earned Best Defensive Player and All-Star Five honors. In 16 games, he averaged 21.25 points, 13.38 rebounds, 3.44 assists, 2.69 steals and 1.19 blocks per game.

On May 23, 2023, Starling signed with the Adelaide 36ers for the 2023–24 NBL season. In 25 games, he averaged 3.8 points and 3.8 rebounds per game.

In March 2024, Starling re-joined the South Adelaide Panthers for the 2024 NBL1 Central season. He was named league MVP for a third time alongside Best Defensive Player and All-Star Five. He was also the league's steals leader with 2.8 per game. With a career-high 23.1 points per game, he helped the Panthers finish with a league-best 15–3 record. They reached the NBL1 Central Grand Final, where they lost 92–90 to the Forestville Eagles despite Starling's 24 points, 13 rebounds and three steals.

On April 29, 2024, Starling re-signed with the 36ers for the 2024–25 NBL season. On October 18, 2024, he was released by the 36ers to make way for injury replacement player Montrezl Harrell to sign with the club on a permanent contract. He appeared in four games to start the season.

In December 2024, Starling joined the Sarawak Cola Warriors of the Major Basketball League Malaysia (MBL) to replace Aaron Burt. In seven games between December 20 and January 4, he averaged 12.0 points, 9.3 rebounds, 1.6 assists ad 2.0 steals per game.

Starling joined the Forestville Eagles for the 2025 NBL1 Central season. He led the league in rebounds with 11.8 per game.

In November 2025, Starling re-signed with the Eagles for the 2026 NBL1 Central season. He was named the NBL1 Central Defensive Player of the Year, earning the league's best defensive player award for the sixth time. He went on to help the Eagles reach the NBL1 Central Grand Final, where they defeated the South Adelaide Panthers 77–58 to win the championship. Starling had 12 points and a game-high 15 rebounds. It marked Starling's fourth Premier League / NBL1 Central championship and third grand final MVP award. At the 2026 NBL1 National Finals, the Eagles reached the championship game, where they were defeated 70–67 in overtime by the Gold Coast Rollers with Starling recording 10 points and eight rebounds. Following the season, he was recognised by Basketball South Australia as a Participant Life Member.

On September 30, 2026, Starling signed with the Woodville Warriors for the 2027 NBL1 Central season, returning to the team for a second stint.

== Personal life ==
Starling's mother is Jennifer Davis. He has an older sister and an older brother.

In May 2023, Starling gained his Australian citizenship.
