= Owen Hulland =

Australian basketball player (born 1999)

Free agent
- Position: Forward / center

Personal information
- Born: 4 September 1999 (age 27) Adelaide, South Australia, Australia
- Listed height: 213 cm (7 ft 0 in)
- Listed weight: 108 kg (238 lb)

Career information
- High school: Lake Ginninderra (Canberra, ACT)
- College: Hawaii (2018–2020)
- NBA draft: 2021: undrafted
- Playing career: 2016–present
- Coaching career: 2026–present

Career history

Playing
- 2016–2018: BA Centre of Excellence
- 2018: Norwood Flames
- 2021: Adelaide 36ers
- 2021: South Adelaide Panthers
- 2023–2025: Forestville Eagles

Coaching
- 2026–present: Forestville Eagles (assistant)

Career highlights
- As assistant coach: NBL1 Central champion (2026)

Owen Simon Hulland (born 4 September 1999) is an Australian professional basketball player who last played for the Forestville Eagles of NBL1 Central. He played college basketball for the Hawaii Rainbow Warriors.

== Early life and career ==
Born in Adelaide, South Australia, Hulland attended UC Senior Secondary College Lake Ginninderra in Canberra, Australian Capital Territory. He played in the South East Australian Basketball League (SEABL) for the BA Centre of Excellence between 2016 and 2018. He finished the 2018 season with the Norwood Flames in the Premier League.

== College career ==
Hulland committed to play for the Hawaii Rainbow Warriors in 2017. He suffered from a foot injury that limited him to only eight games as a freshman during the 2018–19 season. Hulland scored 14 points against the UCLA Bruins on 28 November 2018. He underwent foot surgery before the start of the 2019–20 season that caused him to miss 17 games.

== NBL and NBL1 career ==
On 21 May 2020, Hulland announced that he was leaving the Rainbow Warriors to embark on a professional career in Australia. On 7 January 2021, he signed as a development player with the Adelaide 36ers for the 2020–21 NBL season. 36ers head coach Conner Henry stated that Hulland had left an impression on the players and coaching staff during training sessions with the team.

On 30 March 2021, Hulland signed with the South Adelaide Panthers of the NBL1 Central for the 2021 season. In seven games, he averaged 18.6 points, 8.6 rebounds and 2.0 assists per game.

Hulland joined the Forestville Eagles for the 2023 NBL1 Central season. He returned to the Eagles for the 2024 and 2025 seasons.

== Coaching career ==
Hulland served as an assistant coach with the Forestville Eagles men's team during the 2026 NBL1 season, helping the team win the NBL1 Central championship.
