= Sunday Dech =

Australian basketball player (born 1994)

No. 44 – Cairns Taipans
- Position: Guard
- League: NBL

Personal information
- Born: 1 January 1994 (age 32) Gambela, Ethiopia
- Listed height: 195 cm (6 ft 5 in)
- Listed weight: 92 kg (203 lb)

Career information
- High school: Churchlands (Perth, Western Australia)
- College: Metro State (2016–2017); Barry (2017–2018)
- NBA draft: 2018: undrafted
- Playing career: 2013–present

Career history
- 2013–2016: East Perth Eagles
- 2013–2015: Perth Wildcats
- 2018: Rockingham Flames
- 2018–2019: Perth Wildcats
- 2019: East Perth Eagles
- 2019: Wellington Saints
- 2019–2020: Illawarra Hawks
- 2020–2025: Adelaide 36ers
- 2021: North Adelaide Rockets
- 2022: Canterbury Rams
- 2024: East Perth Eagles
- 2025: Knox Raiders
- 2025–2026: Perth Wildcats
- 2026–present: Cairns Taipans

Career highlights
- 2× NBL champion (2014, 2019); NBL1 Central champion (2021); NZNBL champion (2019); SBL champion (2014); NBL1 Central Grand Final MVP (2021); NBL1 South Defensive Player of the Year (2025); SBL Most Improved Player (2014); SSC All-Newcomer Team (2018)

Sunday Dech (born 1 January 1994) is a South Sudanese-Australian professional basketball player for the Cairns Taipans of the National Basketball League (NBL). He is a two-time NBL champion with the Perth Wildcats, having won in 2014 and 2019. Dech played NCAA Division II college basketball for the Metro State Roadrunners and Barry Buccaneers. He spent a season with the Illawarra Hawks in 2019–20 before playing five seasons for the Adelaide 36ers between 2020 and 2025.

== Early life ==
Dech was born in Gambela, Ethiopia, as one of seven children to South Sudanese parents Abraham Dech and Aret Ochala. His family are members of the Anuak tribe. Dech moved from Gambela to Perth, Western Australia, at the age of six when his father was able to secure immigration forms for his family. He participated in a variety of sports growing up – including Australian rules football, soccer and skateboarding – that he credits as helping him to acclimatise to Australian life. Dech began playing basketball at the age of 16 at Morley Sport and Recreation Centre. He attended Churchlands Senior High School and graduated in 2012.

== Basketball career ==
=== Early years ===
Dech debuted in the State Basketball League (SBL) with the East Perth Eagles in 2013. For the 2013–14 NBL season, he joined the Perth Wildcats as a development player and was a member of the championship-winning team in April 2014. That year, he was named the SBL's Most Improved Player and helped the Eagles win the championship for the 2014 SBL season. He then continued on with the Wildcats as a development player in 2014–15 before playing a third season with East Perth in 2015.

=== College ===
The 2015–16 season saw Dech redshirt with the Metro State Roadrunners. He returned to the Eagles for the 2016 season and then made his college debut with the Roadrunners in the 2016–17 season. In 28 games for the Roadrunners, he averaged 13.0 points and a team-high 6.9 rebounds per game. Dech transferred to Barry University and joined the Buccaneers for the 2017–18 season to play his final season of eligibility. In 32 games, he averaged 13.3 points and a team-high 7.0 rebounds per game. He earned SSC All-Newcomer Team honours and was named in the SSC All-Tournament Team.

=== Professional ===
Following the 2017–18 U.S. college season, Dech returned to Australia to train with the Cairns Taipans and Brisbane Bullets. After a three-game stint with the Rockingham Flames at the back-end of the 2018 SBL season, Dech re-joined the Perth Wildcats for the 2018–19 NBL season as a training player. He was later designated as Perth's nominated replacement player and filled in for the injured Damian Martin and Mitch Norton throughout the season. In March 2019, he was crowned a champion for the second time when the Wildcats defeated Melbourne United in the 2019 NBL Finals. Dech was subsequently awarded the Coaches' Award by head coach Trevor Gleeson. He went on to play in New Zealand during the off-season, where he helped the Wellington Saints win the NZNBL championship.

On 9 April 2019, Dech signed a two-year deal with the Illawarra Hawks after being highly sought after as a free agent. The 2019–20 NBL season saw Dech earn nominations for both the league's Most Improved Player and Best Defensive Player. His remaining contract with the Hawks was voided when the club was liquidated on 18 May 2020.

Dech initially signed with the Southland Sharks before they withdrew prior to the start of the 2020 New Zealand NBL season.

On 22 July 2020, Dech signed a three-year deal with the Adelaide 36ers. He built a reputation as one of the league's standout defenders during the 2020–21 NBL season. Following his first season with the 36ers, Dech played for the North Adelaide Rockets of NBL1 Central during the 2021 NBL1 season. He helped the Rockets win the NBL1 Central championship while earning grand final MVP honours.

Dech missed the start of the 2021–22 NBL season with a hematoma of his quad. For the season, he averaged 12.3 points, 2.43 assists, and 4.26 rebounds per game.

Dech joined the Canterbury Rams for the 2022 New Zealand NBL season. Dech made his debut for the team on 8 May 2022 against the Auckland Tuatara. On 21 May 2022, Dech scored an NZNBL individual season-high 35 points in a loss to the Nelson Giants.

On 29 April 2022, Dech signed a three-year contract extension with the 36ers. He was selected as a member of the 36ers' leadership group alongside teammates Mitch McCarron, Daniel Johnson and Robert Franks for the 2022–23 season. Following the 2023–24 NBL season, he joined the East Perth Eagles of the NBL1 West for the 2024 season. On 31 May, he recorded a triple-double with 20 points, 11 rebounds and 10 assists in the Eagles' 90–78 win over the Perth Redbacks.

Dech missed seven games during the 2024–25 NBL season due to a hamstring injury.

Dech joined the Knox Raiders of the NBL1 South for the 2025 season. He was named NBL1 South Defensive Player of the Year.

On 22 April 2025, Dech signed a three-year deal with the Perth Wildcats, returning to the club for a third stint. A calf injury prevented Dech from playing throughout the pre-season and he was subsequently ruled out of the 2025–26 season opener. On 14 April 2026, Dech and the Wildcats agreed to mutually part ways.

On 27 June 2026, Dech signed a two-year deal with the Cairns Taipans. He experienced right hamstring tightness during the pre-season. On 7 October 2026, he was ruled out for at least four weeks after hurting his hamstring at training.

=== National team ===
In 2022, Dech was selected to play for the South Sudanese national team in the FIBA World Cup Qualifiers.

Dech was named in South Sudan's final roster for the 2024 Olympics.

== Personal life ==
Dech's younger brother, Okummu, played for the South West Slammers in the NBL1 West in 2023.
