= Lachlan Olbrich =

Australian basketball player (born 2003)

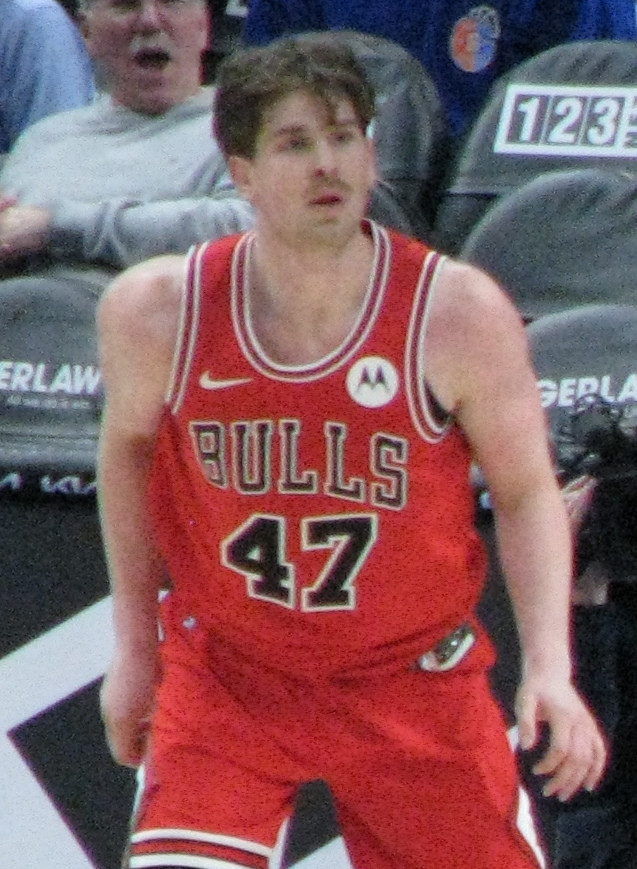
- Olbrich with the Chicago Bulls in 2026

No. 47 – Alvark Tokyo
- Position: Center / power forward
- League: B.League

Personal information
- Born: 30 December 2003 (age 22) Adelaide, South Australia, Australia
- Listed height: 2.08 m (6 ft 10 in)
- Listed weight: 107 kg (236 lb)

Career information
- High school: Reynella East College (Adelaide, South Australia)
- College: UC Riverside (2022–2023)
- NBA draft: 2025: 2nd round, 55th overall pick
- Drafted by: Los Angeles Lakers
- Playing career: 2021–present

Career history
- 2021: BA Centre of Excellence
- 2021–2022: Southern Tigers
- 2021–2022: Adelaide 36ers
- 2023: West Adelaide Bearcats
- 2023–2025: Illawarra Hawks
- 2024: Canterbury Rams
- 2025–2026: Chicago Bulls
- 2025–2026: →Windy City Bulls
- 2026–present: Alvark Tokyo

Career highlights
- NBL champion (2025); NZNBL champion (2024); NZNBL Grand Final MVP (2024); NZNBL Most Valuable Player (2024); NZNBL All-Star Five (2024); NZNBL Most Outstanding Forward (2024); NZNBL Youth Player of the Year (2024); NBL1 Central champion (2023); NBL1 Central Grand Final MVP (2023); 2× NBL1 Central All-Star Five (2022, 2023); 2× NBL1 Central U23 Player of the Year (2022, 2023); Big West Freshman of the Year (2023)
- Stats at NBA.com
- Stats at Basketball Reference

Lachlan Olbrich (born 30 December 2003) is an Australian professional basketball player for Alvark Tokyo of the Japanese B.League. After winning an NBL championship with the Illawarra Hawks in the 2024–25 season, Olbrich was drafted by the Los Angeles Lakers in the second round of the 2025 NBA draft. In 2025–26, he played for the Chicago Bulls of the National Basketball Association (NBA), on a two-way contract with the Windy City Bulls of the NBA G League.

In 2022, Olbrich was named in the NBL1 Central All-Star Five playing for the Southern Tigers. After a season of college basketball in the United States for the UC Riverside Highlanders, he returned to the NBL1 Central in 2023 and helped the West Adelaide Bearcats win the championship while earning grand final MVP and All-Star Five honours. He joined the Illawarra Hawks for the 2023–24 NBL season and then had a championship-winning season with the Canterbury Rams in the 2024 New Zealand NBL season. With the Rams, he was named grand final MVP, league MVP and All-Star Five.

== Early life and career ==
Olbrich was born Adelaide, South Australia. He grew up playing basketball with his older brother Mitchell and his father Greg. He attended Reynella East College in Adelaide, where he played basketball and volleyball. He represented South Australia at national basketball championships in 2020 and 2021.

In 2021, Olbrich played one game for the BA Centre of Excellence in the Waratah League and two games for the Southern Tigers in the NBL1 Central.

In October 2021, Olbrich signed with the Adelaide 36ers of the National Basketball League (NBL) as a development player for the 2021–22 season. He appeared in three games for the 36ers during the season.

Olbrich re-joined the Southern Tigers of the NBL1 Central for the 2022 season. He was named to the All-Star Five and won the Frank Angove Award as the league's best under 23 player. In 12 games, he averaged 19.8 points, 10.5 rebounds, 3.3 assists and 1.1 blocks per game.

== College career ==
Olbrich moved to the United States to play college basketball for the UC Riverside Highlanders of the Big West Conference in the 2022–23 season. He averaged 11.4 points, 6.1 rebounds, and 1.4 assists per game. He was subsequently named Big West Freshman of the Year and earned All-Big West Honorable Mention honours. He became just the second Big West Freshman of the Year in UC Riverside history.

== Professional career ==
=== West Adelaide Bearcats (2023) ===
Olbrich returned to the NBL1 Central and joined the West Adelaide Bearcats for the 2023 season. He was once again named to the All-Star Five and won his second Frank Angove Award. He helped the Bearcats reach the NBL1 Central Grand Final, where they defeated the Forestville Eagles 106–95 to win the championship behind Olbrich's 24 points, 10 rebounds and eight assists. He was subsequently named grand final MVP. In 18 games, he averaged 21.1 points, 9.0 rebounds, and 2.6 assists per game.

=== Illawarra Hawks and Canterbury Rams (2023–2025) ===
On 4 April 2023, Olbrich signed a three-year deal with the Illawarra Hawks of the NBL. He had a breakout showing in the pre-season NBL Blitz but struggled early in the regular season. Upon coach Justin Tatum taking over midway through the season, Olbrich went on to prove himself as a capable back-up for captain Sam Froling. In 31 games in the 2023–24 NBL season, he averaged 3.8 points and 3.1 rebounds per game. Following his first NBL season, he had hopes of declaring for the 2025 NBA draft.

Olbrich joined the Canterbury Rams of the New Zealand National Basketball League (NZNBL) for the 2024 season. On the day he debuted for the Rams on 27 March, he was informed that his father had died in South Australia. He subsequently returned home for an extended period. In his first game back with the Rams in late April, he scored a season-high 35 points against the Hawke's Bay Hawks. He helped the Rams finish top of the competition with a 17–3 record that included a 16-game winning streak. For the season, he was named the New Zealand NBL Most Valuable Player alongside All-Star Five, Most Outstanding Forward and Youth Player of the Year. In the semi-final, Olbrich had 22 points and 16 rebounds and made the game-winning layup with seconds left in a 112–111 double-overtime win over the Taranaki Airs. In the NZNBL Grand Final, he had 29 points, 18 rebounds and six assists to lead the Rams to a 102–87 victory over the Auckland Tuatara to win the championship. Olbrich was named grand final MVP.

Olbrich entered the 2024–25 NBL season after a standout NBL Blitz pre-season tournament with the Hawks, demonstrating his potential in front of NBA scouts. On 28 November 2024, he scored a career-high 21 points in just 13 minutes of court time in a 109–71 win over the New Zealand Breakers. He helped the Hawks earn their first ever minor premiership by finishing on top of the ladder with a 20–9 record. They went on to reach the NBL Grand Final with a 2–1 semi-finals series victory over the South East Melbourne Phoenix. In the grand final series against Melbourne United, Olbrich had averaged 8 points in just 16 minutes per game heading into game four down 2–1. In game four, the Hawks lost starting forward Sam Froling in the first quarter to a knee injury. Olbrich stepped up to score 13 points in 25 minutes in an 80–71 series-tying win. In game five, Olbrich scored 12 points in helping the Hawks win the NBL championship with a 114–104 series-clinching victory. In 37 games for the season, he averaged 8.4 points and 3.8 rebounds per game.

=== Chicago Bulls (2025–2026) ===
Olbrich declared for the 2025 NBA draft, where he was selected by the Los Angeles Lakers with the 55th overall pick. His draft rights were then immediately traded to the Chicago Bulls. On 3 July 2025, he signed a two-way contract with the Bulls and joined the team for the 2025 NBA Summer League. In his NBA debut on 30 November 2025, he recorded two points and three rebounds in a 103–101 loss to the Indiana Pacers. On 1 February 2026, he scored nine points while making his first career 3-pointer in a 134–91 loss to the Miami Heat. On 12 April, Olbrich recorded his first career triple-double, compiling 10 points, 15 rebounds, and 10 assists during a 149–128 loss to the Dallas Mavericks.

In July 2026, Olbrich joined the Golden State Warriors for the 2026 NBA Summer League.

=== Alvark Tokyo (2026–present) ===
On 10 August 2026, Olbrich signed with Alvark Tokyo of the Japanese B.League.

== National team career ==
In November 2024, Olbrich joined the Australian Boomers for the first time to compete in the 2025 FIBA Asia Cup qualifiers.

== Career statistics ==
Legend
GP	Games played	GS	Games started	MPG	Minutes per game
FG%	Field goal percentage	3P%	3-point field goal percentage	FT%	Free throw percentage
RPG	Rebounds per game	APG	Assists per game	SPG	Steals per game
BPG	Blocks per game	PPG	Points per game	**Bold**	Career high

=== NBA ===
Year	Team	GP	GS	MPG	FG%	3P%	FT%	RPG	APG	SPG	BPG	PPG
2025–26	Chicago	37	2	9.3	.468	.105	.375	3.0	1.1	.3	.2	2.4
Career		37	2	9.3	.468	.105	.375	3.0	1.1	.3	.2	2.4

=== NBL ===
Year	Team	GP	GS	MPG	FG%	3P%	FT%	RPG	APG	SPG	BPG	PPG
2021–22	Adelaide	3	0	.4	—	—	—	.0	.0	.0	.0	.0
2023–24	Illawarra	31	0	11.5	.480	**.308**	**.583**	3.1	.7	**.4**	**.5**	3.8
2024–25	Illawarra	**37**	0	**16.6**	**.592**	.091	.541	**3.8**	**1.6**	.3	**.5**	**8.4**

=== College ===
Year	Team	GP	GS	MPG	FG%	3P%	FT%	RPG	APG	SPG	BPG	PPG
2022–23	UC Riverside	34	33	27.9	.479	.292	.556	6.1	1.4	.7	.5	11.4

== Personal life ==
Olbrich's father, Greg Olbrich, was a figure in South Australian basketball and had won the most valuable player in the South Australian State League in 1995. Greg died in March 2024 at age 51 after suffering a cardiac arrest during a social basketball game.
