= Morgan Yaeger =

Australian basketball player

Mainland Pouakai
- Position: Guard
- League: Tauihi Basketball Aotearoa

Personal information
- Born: 18 April 1998 (age 28) Ashford, South Australia, Australia
- Listed height: 5 ft 9 in (1.75 m)

Career information
- High school: St John's Grammar (Adelaide Hills, South Australia)
- College: Oregon (2016–2020)
- WNBA draft: 2020: undrafted
- Playing career: 2014–present

Career history
- 2014–2016: Forestville Eagles
- 2015–2016: Adelaide Lightning
- 2020: Adelaide Lightning
- 2021–2023: Southern Tigers
- 2021–2022: Sydney Uni Flames
- 2022–2023: Townsville Fire
- 2024: Rockhampton Cyclones
- 2024: Tauranga Whai
- 2025: Eastern Mavericks
- 2025–present: Mainland Pouakai
- 2026: West Adelaide Bearcats

Career highlights
- WNBL champion (2023); TBA champion (2024); TBA Grand Final MVP (2024); NBL1 North champion (2024); NBL1 Central champion (2021); NBL1 Central All-Star Five (2026)

Morgan Paige Yaeger (born 18 April 1998) is an Australian professional basketball player.

== Playing career ==
=== WNBL ===
Yaeger debuted in the Women's National Basketball League (WNBL) with the Adelaide Lightning during the 2015–16 season. She re-joined the Lightning for the 2020 WNBL Hub season in Queensland.

During the 2021–22 WNBL season, Yaeger played 14 games for the Sydney Uni Flames. She joined the Townsville Fire for the 2022–23 WNBL season but an injury saw her sit out the majority of the championship-winning campaign.

=== College ===
Yaeger played college basketball at the University of Oregon in Eugene, Oregon, for the Ducks in the NCAA Division I. She played 32 games in 2016–17 but then missed the entire 2017–18 season, redshirting due to a back injury. She returned to play 25 games in 2018–19 and 18 games in 2019–20.

=== State leagues and New Zealand league ===
Between 2014 and 2016, Yaeger played in the Premier League for the Forestville Eagles. Between 2021 and 2023, she played for the Southern Tigers in the same league, now known as NBL1 Central.

In 2024, Yaeger joined the Rockhampton Cyclones of the NBL1 North. Following the NBL1 North season, she played for the Tauranga Whai in the 2024 Tauihi Basketball Aotearoa season. She broke her wrist during her first game and returned later in the season to help the Whai win the league championship behind her grand final MVP performance of 19 points.

In 2025, Yaeger played for the Eastern Mavericks in the NBL1 Central and the Mainland Pouakai in the Tauihi Basketball Aotearoa.

In 2026, Yaeger earned NBL1 Central All-Star Five honours playing for the West Adelaide Bearcats. She helped the Bearcats reach the NBL1 Central grand final, where they lost 76–70 to the Sturt Sabres with Yaeger scoring eight points. Following the NBL1 season, she re-joined the Mainland Pouakai for the 2026 Tauihi season.

=== National team ===
Yaeger first represented Australia in 2013, at the FIBA Oceania Under-16 Championship in Melbourne. She would then go on to represent Australia, at the 2014 FIBA Under-17 World Championship in the Czech Republic.

== Career statistics ==
=== College ===
Ratios
| Year | Team | GP | FG% | 3P% | FT% | RBG | APG | BPG | SPG | PPG |
|---|---|---|---|---|---|---|---|---|---|---|
| 2016-17 | Oregon | 33 | 33.8% | 18.8% | 60.0% | 0.55 | 0.73 | - | 0.15 | 2.12 |
| 2017-18 | Oregon | Medical redshirt | | | | | | | | |
| 2018-19 | Oregon | 25 | 34.0% | 30.4% | - | 0.80 | 0.60 | - | 0.36 | 1.56 |
| 2019-20 | Oregon | 18 | 29.6% | 21.4% | - | 0.72 | 0.22 | 0.06 | 0.11 | 1.06 |
| Career | | 76 | 33.1% | 23.2% | 54.5% | 0.67 | 0.57 | 0.01 | 0.21 | 1.68 |

Totals
| Year | Team | GP | FG | FGA | 3P | 3PA | FT | FTA | REB | A | BK | ST | PTS |
|---|---|---|---|---|---|---|---|---|---|---|---|---|---|
| 2016-17 | Oregon | 33 | 26 | 77 | 6 | 32 | 12 | 20 | 18 | 24 | 0 | 5 | 70 |
| 2017-18 | Oregon | Medical redshirt | | | | | | | | | | | |
| 2018-19 | Oregon | 25 | 16 | 47 | 7 | 23 | 0 | 2 | 20 | 15 | 0 | 9 | 39 |
| 2019-20 | Oregon | 18 | 8 | 27 | 3 | 14 | 0 | 0 | 13 | 4 | 1 | 2 | 19 |
| Career | | 76 | 50 | 151 | 16 | 69 | 12 | 22 | 51 | 43 | 1 | 16 | 128 |
