= Mitch Creek =

Australian basketball player (born 1992)

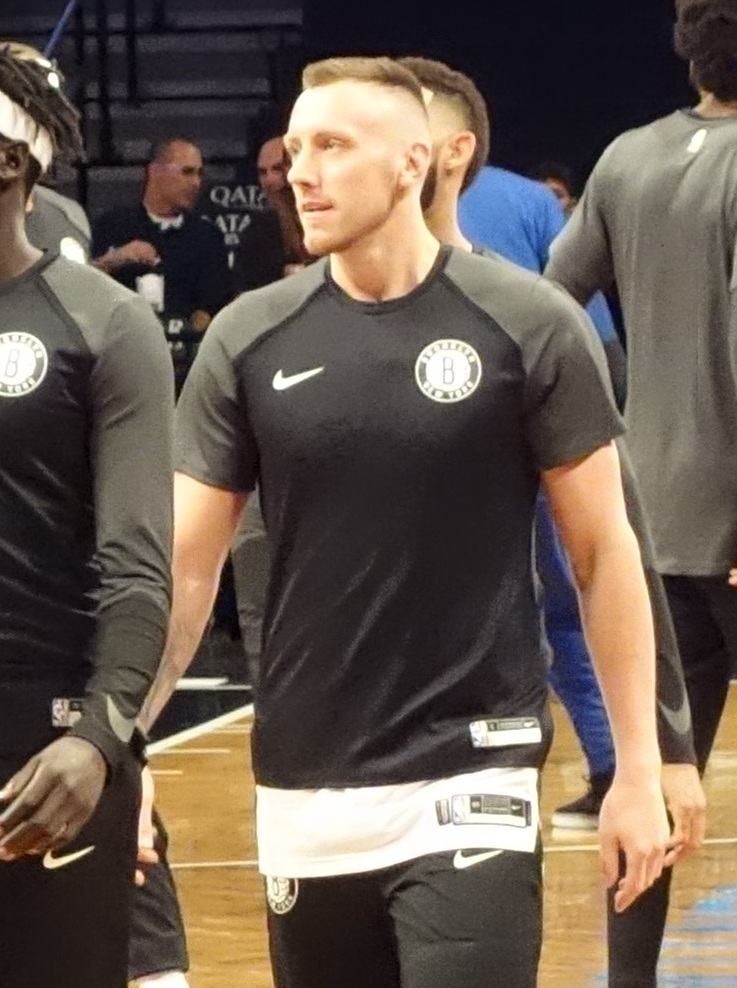
- Creek with the Brooklyn Nets in 2018

No. 55 – Al-Ula
- Position: Power forward / small forward
- League: Saudi Basketball League

Personal information
- Born: 27 April 1992 (age 34) Horsham, Victoria, Australia
- Listed height: 196 cm (6 ft 5 in)
- Listed weight: 102 kg (225 lb)

Career information
- High school: St Brigid's College (Horsham, Victoria)
- NBA draft: 2014: undrafted
- Playing career: 2009–present

Career history
- 2009–2010: Australian Institute of Sport
- 2010–2018: Adelaide 36ers
- 2011: South Adelaide Panthers
- 2012: Woodville Warriors
- 2014: Nunawading Spectres
- 2015: Woodville Warriors
- 2016: Southern Tigers
- 2018: Göttingen
- 2018–2019: Long Island Nets
- 2019: Brooklyn Nets
- 2019: →Long Island Nets
- 2019: Minnesota Timberwolves
- 2019–2024: South East Melbourne Phoenix
- 2021: South West Metro Pirates
- 2022–2023: Mets de Guaynabo
- 2024: Xinjiang Flying Tigers
- 2024: Atléticos de San Germán
- 2024–2026: Vancouver Bandits
- 2024–2025: Trabzonspor
- 2025–2026: U-BT Cluj-Napoca
- 2026–present: Al-Ula

Career highlights
- All-EuroCup Second Team (2026); All-ABA League Team (2026); Romanian League champion (2026); Romanian Cup winner (2026); Romanian Supercup winner (2025); CEBL Player of the Year (2025); All-CEBL First Team (2025); Türkiye Basketbol Ligi champion (2025); NBL Fans MVP (2018); All-NBL First Team (2023); 4× All-NBL Second Team (2018, 2021, 2022, 2024); Premier League champion (2016); Premier League MVP (2016); Premier League Grand Final MVP (2016); Albert Schweitzer Tournament MVP (2010)
- Stats at NBA.com
- Stats at Basketball Reference
Medals
Men's basketball
Representing Australia
FIBA Asia Cup
| Gold medal – first place | 2017 Lebanon |

Mitchell Creek (born 27 April 1992) is an Australian professional basketball player for Al-Ula of the Saudi Basketball League. He began his National Basketball League (NBL) career in 2010 and played his first eight seasons with the Adelaide 36ers. After a stint in Germany in 2018, he joined the Long Island Nets of the NBA G League. During the 2018–19 season, he had stints in the National Basketball Association (NBA) with the Brooklyn Nets and Minnesota Timberwolves. He played for the South East Melbourne Phoenix between 2019 and 2024.

== Early life and career ==
Creek was born and raised in Horsham, Victoria. He attended St Brigid's College, where he earned induction into the school's hall of fame. He grew up playing for the Horsham Hornets.

In 2009, Creek played a leading role in Victoria Country's campaign at the Under-18 National Championships, trained with the Australian under-19 squad, and earned a place at the prestigious Nike All-Asia Camp in Beijing, China. He also joined the Australian Institute of Sport (AIS) in Canberra. He played for the AIS men's team in the South East Australian Basketball League (SEABL), recording one game in 2009 and 14 games in 2010.

In 2010, Creek helped Victoria Country win the gold medal at the Under-20 National Championships and helped the Australian under-19 team win its first gold medal at the Albert Schweitzer Tournament in Mannheim, Germany. Creek was subsequently crowned the tournament's most valuable player after averaging 17 points per game and finishing second in efficiency on plus 20.

In 2011, Creek helped Victoria Country win back-to-back gold medals at the Under-20 National Championships. He subsequently won the Bob Staunton Award for tournament MVP after averaging 19 points, 7.6 rebounds and 3 assists per game.

== Professional career ==
=== Adelaide 36ers (2010–2018) ===
Creek joined the Adelaide 36ers for the 2010–11 NBL season. He made his NBL debut on 3 December 2010, recording seven points and three steals in 21 minutes off the bench in a 92–79 win over the Townsville Crocodiles. In 20 games as a rookie, Creek averaged 5.8 points and 2.4 rebounds per game. He remained in Adelaide following his rookie season and played for the South Adelaide Panthers of the Central ABL. In 2011–12, Creek appeared in all 28 games for the 36ers, averaging 5.4 points, 3.0 rebounds and 1.2 assists per game. He again played in the Central ABL during the 2012 off-season, appearing in five games for the Woodville Warriors.

Creek's 2012–13 season was cut short after rupturing his Achilles tendon on 15 December against the Crocodiles in Adelaide. In 12 games, he averaged 5.8 points and 2.6 rebounds per game. He returned to action in 2013–14, helping the 36ers reach the NBL Grand Final, where they lost to the Perth Wildcats in three games. In 33 games, Creek averaged 7.7 points, 3.8 rebounds and 1.0 assists per game. During the 2014 off-season, Creek played in the SEABL for the Nunawading Spectres.

Creek had a career-best season in 2014–15, averaging 11.2 points, 4.4 rebounds and 1.5 assists in 26 games. During the 2015 off-season, he played for the Woodville Warriors. In 2015–16, Creek averaged 9.9 points, 4.1 rebounds, 1.4 assists and 1.1 steals in 26 games for the 36ers.

During the 2016 off-season, Creek helped the Southern Tigers of the South Australian Premier League win the championship. He was named Grand Final MVP after recording 29 points, 14 rebounds, five assists, two steals and three blocks in an 85–66 win over the Sturt Sabres. He was also named league MVP, Defensive Player of the Year and earned All-Star Five honours.

After signing a three-year contract extension with the 36ers in May 2016, Creek was named team captain for the 2016–17 season. On 16 October, he was ruled out for eight weeks after sustaining a stress fracture in his right foot against Melbourne United two days earlier. Creek returned to action on 10 December, scoring 14 points off the bench in a 102–92 win over the New Zealand Breakers. Creek went on to help the 36ers win the minor premiership with a 17–11 record. In 21 games, he averaged 12.1 points, 5.4 rebounds, 1.9 assists and 1.0 steals per game. Despite suffering a broken hand following the 2016–17 season, Creek was invited to participate in a free agent mini-camp run by the Utah Jazz before joining the Jazz's Summer League team.

In 2017–18, despite missing three weeks with a hamstring injury, Creek was named the NBL Fans MVP and earned All-NBL Second Team honours. Creek helped the 36ers reach the 2018 NBL Grand Final series, where they were defeated 3–2 by Melbourne United. He averaged 14.8 points, 6.0 rebounds, and 2.6 assists in what was a career-best season.

=== Europe, NBA G League and NBA (2018–2019) ===
Creek finished the 2017–18 German Basketball Bundesliga season with BG Göttingen. In seven games, he averaged 11.9 points, 2.7 rebounds and 1.3 assists per game.

After initially signing with s.Oliver Würzburg for the 2018–19 season, an NBA Summer League stint with the Dallas Mavericks led to Creek spending preseason with the Brooklyn Nets. He subsequently joined the Long Island Nets of the NBA G League. On 25 January 2019, he signed a 10-day contract with Brooklyn. He made his NBA debut later that day, entering the game against the New York Knicks to take free throws for an injured Rondae Hollis-Jefferson in the fourth quarter, making one of them. He signed a second 10-day contract on 4 February, but was waived on 7 February. During his time with Brooklyn, he was assigned to Long Island four times. Upon being waived, he re-joined Long Island permanently.

On 30 March, Creek signed a 10-day contract with the Minnesota Timberwolves. On 9 April, he signed with the Timberwolves for the rest of the season. In July 2019, he played for the Timberwolves at the Las Vegas Summer League.

=== Phoenix, Puerto Rico, and China (2019–2024) ===
Creek joined the South East Melbourne Phoenix for their debut season in the NBL in 2019–20. He scored an NBL career-high 32 points in a game against the Cairns Taipans on 26 January 2020. He missed the last two games of the season after hyperextending his knee against the Sydney Kings on 9 February.

On 15 March 2021, the NBL announced that Creek would not play or train with the Phoenix indefinitely after he received charges stemming from alleged assault offences. He was reinstated by the NBL on 30 March but was relinquished of his team captaincy and not allowed to participate in community activities with the Phoenix. All charges were dropped on 21 April. He helped the Phoenix reach the semifinals in 2020–21.

Creek played for the South West Metro Pirates of the NBL1 North during the 2021 season.

On 10 December 2021, Creek scored a career-high 36 points in a 95–88 win over the New Zealand Breakers.

Following the 2021–22 NBL season, Creek had a stint in Puerto Rico with Mets de Guaynabo of the Baloncesto Superior Nacional.

On 18 May 2022, Creek re-signed with the Phoenix on a three-year deal. In November 2022, he played his 300th NBL game. On 18 December 2022, he scored 46 points in a 113–112 double-overtime win over the Sydney Kings. Following the 2022–23 NBL season, he returned to Mets de Guaynabo.

In the 2023–24 NBL season, Creek averaged 20.8 points and 6.7 rebounds per game, subsequently being named to the All-NBL Second Team. After five seasons, he parted ways with the Phoenix, leaving as its franchise leader in points, rebounds, assists, and steals.

In March 2024, Creek signed with the Xinjiang Flying Tigers of the Chinese Basketball Association for the rest of the season. In June 2024, he joined Atléticos de San Germán of the BSN.

=== Canada, Turkey and Romania (2024–2026) ===
In July 2024, Creek joined the Vancouver Bandits of the Canadian Elite Basketball League (CEBL) for the rest of the 2024 season.

In November 2024, Creek signed with Trabzonspor of the Türkiye Basketbol Ligi (TBL). In 21 games during the 2024–25 season, he averaged 21.5 points, 6.5 rebounds, 3.0 assists and 1.1 steals per game.

On 9 May 2025, Creek re-signed with the Bandits for the 2025 CEBL season. He was named CEBL Player of the Year and All-CEBL First Team after leading Vancouver to a league-best 19–5 record while finishing second in the CEBL in scoring with 24.4 points per game.

On 27 July 2025, Creek signed with U-BT Cluj-Napoca of the Romanian Liga Națională, the ABA League and the EuroCup. He was named to the All-ABA League Team for the 2025–26 season. He captained the team to the Romanian League championship and received All-EuroCup Second Team honours.

On 14 June 2026, Creek re-signed with the Bandits for the rest of the 2026 CEBL season.

=== Saudi Arabia (2026–present) ===
In September 2026, Creek signed with Al-Ula of the Saudi Basketball League.

== Career statistics ==
Legend
| GP | Games played | GS | Games started | MPG | Minutes per game |
| FG% | Field goal percentage | 3P% | 3-point field goal percentage | FT% | Free throw percentage |
| RPG | Rebounds per game | APG | Assists per game | SPG | Steals per game |
| BPG | Blocks per game | PPG | Points per game | **Bold** | Career high |

=== NBA ===
==== Regular season ====
| Year | Team | GP | GS | MPG | FG% | 3P% | FT% | RPG | APG | SPG | BPG | PPG |
|---|---|---|---|---|---|---|---|---|---|---|---|---|
| 2018–19 | Brooklyn | **4** | 0 | 9.0 | **.500** | .000 | **.714** | **2.5** | **1.3** | .3 | .0 | 3.8 |
| 2018–19 | Minnesota | 1 | 0 | **12.0** | **.500** | .000 | --- | 2.0 | 1.0 | **1.0** | .0 | **6.0** |
| Career | | 5 | 0 | 9.6 | .500 | .000 | .714 | 2.4 | 1.2 | .4 | .0 | 4.2 |

== National team career ==
Creek competed for Australia at the 2011 FIBA Under-19 World Championship. In 2017, he represented the Australian Boomers at the FIBA Asia Cup. He later played for Australia during the 2019 FIBA World Cup qualifiers. In February 2021, Creek was named in the Boomers' Olympic squad.

In February 2026, Creek was named in the Boomers squad for two FIBA World Cup Asian qualifiers. In June 2026, he was named in the squad for two more Asian qualifiers in Perth in July.

== Personal life ==
Off the court, Creek is a qualified personal trainer.
