= Michael Harris (basketball, born 1999) =

Australian basketball player (born 1999)

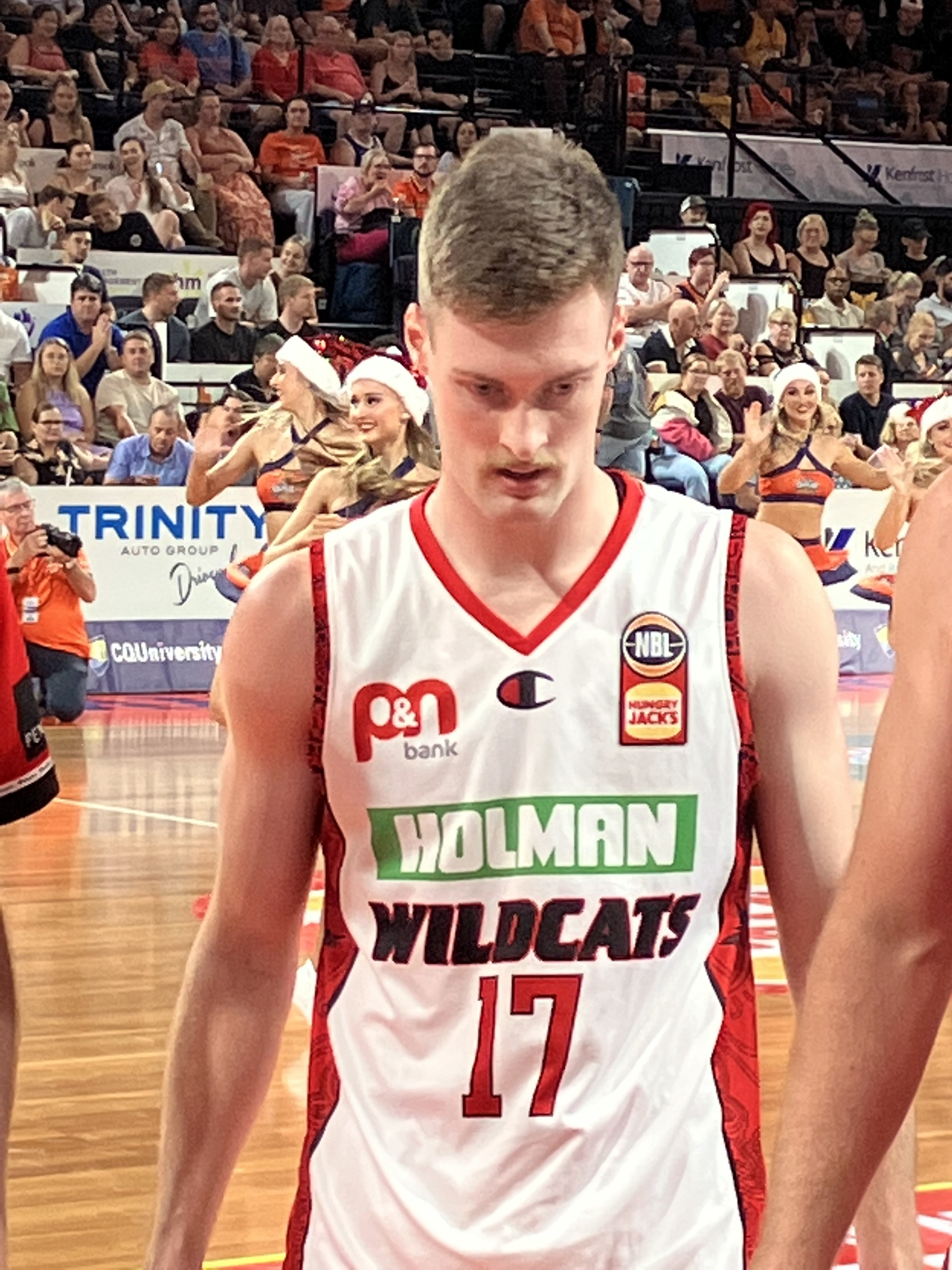
- Harris with the Perth Wildcats in 2022

No. 17 – Rockingham Flames
- Position: Shooting guard
- League: NBL1 West

Personal information
- Born: 5 October 1999 (age 26) Mount Gambier, South Australia, Australia
- Listed height: 193 cm (6 ft 4 in)
- Listed weight: 85 kg (187 lb)

Career information
- Playing career: 2017–present

Career history
- 2017–2019; 2021: Forestville Eagles
- 2018–2020: Adelaide 36ers
- 2022: Mount Gambier Pioneers
- 2022–2025: Perth Wildcats
- 2023: Otago Nuggets
- 2024: Warwick Senators
- 2025: Frankston Blues
- 2025–2026: Adelaide 36ers
- 2026–present: Rockingham Flames

Career highlights
- NBL1 West champion (2026); Premier League champion (2019); Premier League Grand Final MVP (2019); All-NBL1 West First Team (2024); 2× NBL1 South All-Star Five / All First Team (2022, 2025); NBL1 Central All-Star Five (2021); NBL1 South scoring champion (2025); 2× Premier League / NBL1 Central Youth Player of the Year (2019, 2021)

Michael Paul Jason Harris (born 5 October 1999) is an Australian professional basketball player for the Rockingham Flames of the NBL1 West. Harris began his National Basketball League (NBL) career as a training player for the Adelaide 36ers in the 2018–19 season. After a development player season for the 36ers in 2019–20, he joined the Perth Wildcats in 2022, where he spent three seasons.

== Early life ==
Harris was born and raised in Mount Gambier, South Australia. He moved to Mount Barker as a teenager and came through the Forestville Eagles junior program.

== Playing career ==
=== Forestville Eagles and Adelaide 36ers (2017–2021) ===
Harris debuted in the South Australian Premier League in 2017 with the Forestville Eagles. In 16 games, he averaged 3.06 points, 1.81 rebounds and 1.19 assists per game. He increased his averages to 16.55 points and 3.86 rebounds in 22 games in 2018, where during the season he had a 52-point game. He subsequently joined the Adelaide 36ers of the National Basketball League (NBL) as a training player for the 2018–19 season.

In 2019, Harris helped the Eagles reach the Premier League grand final, where they defeated the Mount Gambier Pioneers 107–90 to win the championship. He was named grand final MVP after scoring a game-high 30 points. In 24 games, he averaged 18.96 points, 4.62 rebounds and 2.21 assists per game. He was subsequently named the recipient of the Frank Angove Medal as the Premier League's Under 21 Player of the Year.

Harris returned to the 36ers as a development player for the 2019–20 NBL season. He played in two games during the season.

With the Eagles now in the NBL1 Central, Harris played for Forestville in the 2021 NBL1 season. In 20 games, he averaged 22.9 points, 7.25 rebounds and 4.95 assists per game. He was subsequently named the recipient of the Frank Angove Medal once again, this time as the NBL1 Central's Under 23 Player of the Year. He was also named in league's All-Star Five.

=== Mount Gambier Pioneers (2022) ===
In October 2021, Harris signed with the Mount Gambier Pioneers of the NBL1 South for the 2022 season. He helped the Pioneers reach the grand final, where they lost 78–62 to the Hobart Chargers with Harris scoring 13 points. In 24 games, he averaged 23.83 points, 6.54 rebounds and 2.88 assists per game. He was subsequently named to the NBL1 South All-Star Five.

=== Perth Wildcats, Otago Nuggets and Warwick Senators (2022–2025) ===
On 11 August 2022, Harris signed with the Perth Wildcats as a development player for the 2022–23 NBL season. He impressed coach John Rillie in his first season and soon moved up the playing rotation as he overtook fully rostered teammates, coming off the bench as an impact player to shoot at 42 per cent from three-point range. On 20 December, he recorded season highs of 17 points and five rebounds in a 105–83 win over the Cairns Taipans. In 17 games, he averaged 3.53 points and 1.71 rebounds per game. For the season, he was named the Wildcats' most improved player.

Following the NBL season, Harris joined the Otago Nuggets of the New Zealand National Basketball League (NZNBL) for the 2023 season. In 19 games, he averaged 22.3 points, 5.5 rebounds, 2.5 assists and 1.5 steals per game.

On 7 April 2023, Harris re-signed with the Wildcats on a two-year deal, the first year as a development player and the second year as a fully rostered player. For the 2023–24 NBL season, he took on a new role as one of coach John Rillie's key defenders. Although his playing time increased, his shooting performance declined. In 26 games, he averaged 2.7 points and 1.5 rebounds per game.

Harris joined the Warwick Senators of the NBL1 West for the 2024 season. In his debut for the Senators on 28 March 2024, he scored 42 points in a 97–83 win over the East Perth Eagles. On 3 May, he scored 42 points with 10 3-pointers in a 107–83 win over the Perry Lakes Hawks. He was named to the All-NBL1 West First Team. In 21 games, he averaged 27.0 points, 6.57 rebounds, 5.43 assists and 1.62 steals per game.

Harris joined the Wildcats' main roster for the 2024–25 NBL season. In 20 games, he averaged 1.9 points in 6.1 minutes per game.

=== Frankston Blues (2025) ===
Harris joined the Frankston Blues for the 2025 NBL1 South season. On 29 June 2025, he recorded 40 points and 12 assists in a 104–103 loss to the Dandenong Rangers. He was named NBL1 South All First Team and earned the league's scoring title for his 24.68 points per game.

=== Return to Adelaide (2025–2026) ===
On 7 April 2025, Harris signed a two-year deal (the second year being a mutual option) with the Adelaide 36ers, returning to the club for a second stint. After appearing in 17 games during the 2025–26 NBL season, Harris and the 36ers declined the mutual option for the 2026–27 season.

=== Rockingham Flames (2026–present) ===
Harris joined the Rockingham Flames of the NBL1 West for the 2026 season. On 9 May, he scored 45 points with nine 3-pointers in a 114–93 win over the Joondalup Wolves. He missed the Flames' finals campaign that resulted in a grand final berth. While he was active for the grand final, he did not play in what was a 66–62 championship-winning victory over the Geraldton Buccaneers. In 19 games, he averaged 19.32 points, 5.84 rebounds, 4.42 assists and 2.26 steals per game. He remained sidelined for the 2026 NBL1 National Finals through injury.
