= Alex Mudronja =

Australian basketball player (born 1999)

No. 7 – Fortaleza Basquete Cearense
- Position: Guard
- League: Novo Basquete Brasil

Personal information
- Born: 3 September 1999 (age 27) Adelaide, South Australia, Australia
- Listed height: 196 cm (6 ft 5 in)
- Listed weight: 88 kg (194 lb)

Career information
- High school: Lake Ginninderra (Canberra, Australian Capital Territory)
- College: Saint Mary's (2018–2019)
- NBA draft: 2020: undrafted
- Playing career: 2015–present

Career history
- 2015: Sturt Sabres
- 2016–2018: BA Centre of Excellence
- 2019: Sturt Sabres
- 2019–2021: Adelaide 36ers
- 2021: South Adelaide Panthers
- 2021–2023: Illawarra Hawks
- 2022: North Gold Coast Seahawks
- 2023: Southern Districts Spartans
- 2023–2024: Cairns Taipans
- 2024: Cairns Marlins
- 2024–2025: Sarawak Cola Warriors
- 2025: Delhi Dribblers
- 2025–present: Mount Gambier Pioneers
- 2025–present: Fortaleza Basquete Cearense

Alexander Mudronja (born 3 September 1999) is an Australian professional basketball player for Fortaleza Basquete Cearense of the Novo Basquete Brasil. He is also contracted with the Mount Gambier Pioneers of the NBL1 South.

== Early life and career ==
Mudronja played as a junior with the Sturt Sabres before he joined the BA Centre of Excellence at the Australian Institute of Sport (AIS). He played in the SEABL for the Centre of Excellence between 2016 and 2018.

Mudronja was a member of the South Australian state team when they won the U20 Men's Championships in 2017 and was awarded the Bob Staunton Award as the most outstanding player during the 2018 competition.

== College career ==
In 2018, Mudronja moved to the United States where he played a season of college basketball for the Saint Mary's Gaels.

== Professional career ==
After one season with the Gaels, Mudronja returned to Australia in 2019 and had a short stint with the Sturt Sabres in the Premier League before signing a three-year contract with the Adelaide 36ers of the National Basketball League (NBL). He was assigned as a development player during the 2019–20 season before he was elevated to a full roster position for the remainder of his contract. On 18 June 2021, Mudronja was released from the final season of his contract.

Mudronja joined the South Adelaide Panthers of the NBL1 Central for the 2021 NBL1 season.

On 15 November 2021, Mudronja signed with the Illawarra Hawks on a three-year contract. Following the 2021–22 NBL season, he played for the North Gold Coast Seahawks of the NBL1 North during the 2022 NBL1 season. Following the 2022–23 NBL season, he played for the Southern Districts Spartans during the 2023 NBL1 North season.

On 8 August 2023, Mudronja signed with the Cairns Taipans as a development player for the 2023–24 NBL season. Following the NBL season, he joined the Cairns Marlins for the 2024 NBL1 North season.

Mudronja joined the Sarawak Cola Warriors of the Major Basketball League Malaysia for the 2024–25 season. He then joined the Delhi Dribblers of the Indian National Basketball League (INBL) for the 2025 season. He later joined the Mount Gambier Pioneers of the NBL1 South for the 2025 NBL1 season.

In December 2025, Mudronja joined Fortaleza Basquete Cearense of the Novo Basquete Brasil.

He is set to re-join the Pioneers for the 2026 NBL1 South season.

== National team career ==
Mudronja played for Australia at the 2015 FIBA Oceania Under-16 Championship. He next represented Australia during the 2023 FIBA World Cup Asian qualifiers.
