= 2008 Australian Club Championships =

Tournament details
- Arena: Melbourne Sports and Aquatic Centre; Melbourne, Victoria
- Dates: 16–31 August

Final positions
- Champions: M: Rockhampton Rockets; W: Townsville Flames
- Runners-up: M: Hobart Chargers; W: Sydney Comets

The 2008 Australian Club Championships (ACC) brought together the best men's and women's basketball teams from the Waratah League, South East Australian Basketball League (SEABL), Queensland Australian Basketball League (QABL), Central Australian Basketball League (CABL) and Big V competitions for their shot at national glory, with the event held at the Melbourne Sports and Aquatic Centre.

By the tournament's conclusion, the Rockhampton Rockets were crowned as the best male basketball club in Australia while the Townsville Flames were crowned women's champions for the second year in succession. The tournament was the final ACC National Finals after the Australian Basketball Association (ABA) was disbanded following the 2008 season.

== Tournament overview ==
The 2008 ACC quarter-finals began on 16 August when the two SEABL men's conference champions, the Hobart Chargers (South) and the Knox Raiders (East), faced off for the overall SEABL championship and a spot in the ACC semi-finals.

The remaining 14 teams (eight women's and six men's) then faced off against each other on 23 August to determine who would be heading to the Melbourne Sports and Aquatic Centre on 30 August for the semi-finals.

The Rockhampton Rockets booked their place in the men's decider after a thrilling 100–93 victory over the Sandringham Sabres in the semi-final, while the Chargers defeated the Melbourne Tigers 128–126 in overtime in the other semi-final. In the men's Grand Final, the Rockets defeated the Chargers in a cliff hanger, 103–99, with grand final MVP Ryan McDade finishing with 24 points and 19 rebounds.

In the women's Grand Final, the Townsville Flames made it double celebrations for Queensland teams, clinching back-to-back national women's championships. The Flames, who edged out the Kilsyth Cobras 77–71 in their semi, overpowered the Sydney Comets 73–57 in the decider. A Flames win looked on the cards at halftime when they led 38–26, but Sydney responded with a 22–10 third-quarter run to level the scores before Townsville went on a devastating 25–9 run spearheaded by MVP Cherie Smith to seal the Championship. The win marked the second year in a row that Queensland's champions completed a men's and women's ACC double.

== Participants ==
To qualify for the event, teams had to be crowned Champion of their respective Leagues. There were also a number of wildcard entries.

=== League champions ===
League	Men	Women
Big V	Melbourne Tigers	Hume City Broncos
CABL	Norwood Flames	North Adelaide Rockets
QABL	Rockhampton Rockets	Townsville Flames
SEABL	Hobart Chargers (South) & Knox Raiders (East)	Kilsyth Cobras
Waratah	Sutherland Sharks	Sydney Comets

=== Wildcards ===
League	Men	Women
Big V	Sandringham Sabres	
CABL	Forestville Eagles	
QABL		South West Metro Pirates
SEABL		Nunawading Spectres
Waratah		Bankstown Bruins

== Results ==
=== Quarter-finals – men ===
16 August

Hobart Chargers	133–102	Knox Raiders

Geelong Arena, Geelong, Victoria

23 August

Melbourne Tigers	119–92	Forestville Eagles

Veneto Club, Bulleen, Victoria

23 August

Rockhampton Rockets	82–68	Sutherland Sharks

Bankstown Basketball Stadium, Condell Park, New South Wales

23 August

Sandringham Sabres	99–82	Norwood Flames

MARS Sporting Complex, Marden, South Australia

=== Quarter-finals – women ===
23 August

Kilsyth Cobras	85–55	North Adelaide Rockets

Kilsyth Sports Centre, Kilsyth, Victoria

23 August

Townsville Flames	95–50	Bankstown Bruins

Townsville SeaFM Stadium, Townsville, Queensland

23 August

Hume City Broncos	66–65	Nunawading Spectres

Broadmeadows Basketball Stadium, Broadmeadows, Victoria

23 August

Sydney Comets	69–44	South West Metro Pirates

Alexandria Basketball Stadium, Alexandria, New South Wales

=== Semi-finals – men ===
30 August

Rockhampton Rockets	100–93	Sandringham Sabres

Melbourne Sports and Aquatic Centre

30 August

Hobart Chargers	128–126	Melbourne Tigers

Melbourne Sports and Aquatic Centre

=== Semi-finals – women ===
30 August

Townsville Flames	77–71	Kilsyth Cobras

Melbourne Sports and Aquatic Centre

30 August

Sydney Comets	78–77	Hume City Broncos

Melbourne Sports and Aquatic Centre

=== Grand Finals ===
31 August

Rockhampton Rockets	103–99	Hobart Chargers

Melbourne Sports and Aquatic Centre

31 August

Townsville Flames	73–57	Sydney Comets

Melbourne Sports and Aquatic Centre

== All-Star Five ==
=== Men ===
Name	Team
Ryan McDade (Grand Final MVP)	Rockhampton Rockets
Daniel Johnson	Melbourne Tigers
Daryl Corletto	Melbourne Tigers
Anthony Stewart	Hobart Chargers
Jermaine Maybank	Sandringham Sabres

=== Women ===
Name	Team
Sharin Milner	Hume City Broncos
Rachael Flanagan	Townsville Flames
Cherie Smith (Grand Final MVP)	Townsville Flames
Sally Potocki	Sydney Comets
Clare Papavs	Kilsyth Cobras

== See also ==
- Australian Basketball Association
