= Daniel Johnson (basketball) =

Australian basketball player (born 1988)

No. 21 – Forestville Eagles
- Position: Centre / power forward
- League: NBL1 Central

Personal information
- Born: 3 April 1988 (age 38) Carnarvon, Western Australia, Australia
- Listed height: 212 cm (6 ft 11 in)
- Listed weight: 108 kg (238 lb)

Career information
- High school: Willetton (Perth, Western Australia)
- College: Pepperdine (2007–2008)
- NBA draft: 2009: undrafted
- Playing career: 2006–present

Career history
- 2006–2007: Australian Institute of Sport
- 2008–2009: Melbourne Tigers (Big V)
- 2008–2010: Melbourne Tigers (NBL)
- 2010: Willetton Tigers
- 2010–2014: Adelaide 36ers
- 2011: South Adelaide Panthers
- 2013: West Adelaide Bearcats
- 2014: Piratas de Quebradillas
- 2014: West Adelaide Bearcats
- 2014–2015: Stelmet Zielona Góra
- 2015–2023: Adelaide 36ers
- 2015: Wellington Saints
- 2016: Santeros de Aguada
- 2016: Sturt Sabres
- 2017: Petrochimi Bandar Imam
- 2018: Forestville Eagles
- 2018: Ferro Carril Oeste
- 2019: Earthfriends Tokyo Z
- 2020: SeaHorses Mikawa
- 2022: Forestville Eagles
- 2023: South Adelaide Panthers
- 2023: South East Melbourne Phoenix
- 2023–2024: Taiwan Beer Leopards
- 2024–present: Forestville Eagles

Career highlights
- 3× All-NBL First Team (2014, 2017, 2018); 3× All-NBL Second Team (2013, 2016, 2019); All-NBL Third Team (2012); NBL Most Improved Player (2012); 2× NBL rebounding leader (2013, 2016); No. 21 retired by Adelaide 36ers; 2× NBL1 Central champion (2024, 2026); SBL champion (2010); 2× Big V champion (2008, 2009); NBL1 National Finals All-Star Five (2026); ACC All-Star Five (2008)
Medals
Men's basketball
Representing Australia
Commonwealth Games
Silver medal – second place	2022 Birmingham	3x3 Competition

Daniel Geoffrey Craig Johnson (born 3 April 1988) is an Australian professional basketball player for the Forestville Eagles of the NBL1 Central. He debuted in the National Basketball League (NBL) in 2008 with the Melbourne Tigers. After two seasons, he joined the Adelaide 36ers where he played the next 13 seasons. With the 36ers, he is a seven-time All-NBL Team member, including three All-NBL First Team recognitions. Johnson is also a long-time Australian state league player and has had many stints overseas.

== Early life and junior career ==
Johnson was born in Carnarvon, Western Australia, and grew up in Perth, where he attended Willetton Senior High School. In 2006 and 2007, he attended the Australian Institute of Sport (AIS) and played for the AIS men's team in the South East Australian Basketball League (SEABL). In 2006, he helped the AIS win the King Club International Cup en route to being voted the tournament's Most Valuable Player after averaging 22 points, six rebounds, one assist, two blocks and a steal over five games. He was also a member of the Australian national under-19 team that competed in Germany, Taiwan and Italy in 2006. The following year, he played for the Emus at the 2007 FIBA Under-19 World Championship in Serbia.

Johnson moved to the United States to play college basketball for Pepperdine University in the 2007–08 NCAA season. Holding the Waves' starting centre position for most of the season, Johnson averaged 9.4 points and 3.8 rebounds in 21 games. He decided to leave the team and return home after the departure of his coach and several teammates.

== Professional career ==
=== NBL ===
==== Melbourne Tigers (2008–2010) ====
Johnson returned to Australia in 2008 and played two seasons with the Melbourne Tigers in the NBL. In his rookie season, the Tigers made it to the grand final series, where they lost in five games to the South Dragons.

==== Adelaide 36ers (2010–2023) ====
Johnson played his first season with the Adelaide 36ers in 2010–11. In his second season with Adelaide, Johnson earned his first player of the week award and won the NBL Most Improved Player while also earning All-NBL Third Team honours. In his third season with Adelaide, he led the league in rebounding (8.1 per game) and earned All-NBL Second Team honours.

In the 2013–14 season, Johnson helped the 36ers reach the NBL Grand Final series while earning All-NBL First Team honors. He was also named the 36ers Club MVP for the third straight year.

Johnson started the 2014–15 season in Poland with Stelmet Zielona Góra, but returned to the Adelaide 36ers in January 2015.

In the 2015–16 season, Johnson's 9.3 rebounds per game saw him lead the NBL in rebounding for the second time while once again earning All-NBL Second Team honours. In the 2016–17 season, Johnson helped the 36ers win the minor premiership while earning All-NBL First Team honours. In the 2017–18 season, Johnson helped the 36ers reach the NBL Grand Final series while earning All-NBL First Team honours. In the 2018–19 season, Johnson served as captain of the 36ers for the first time. He went on to win the Club MVP and earn All-NBL Second Team honours.

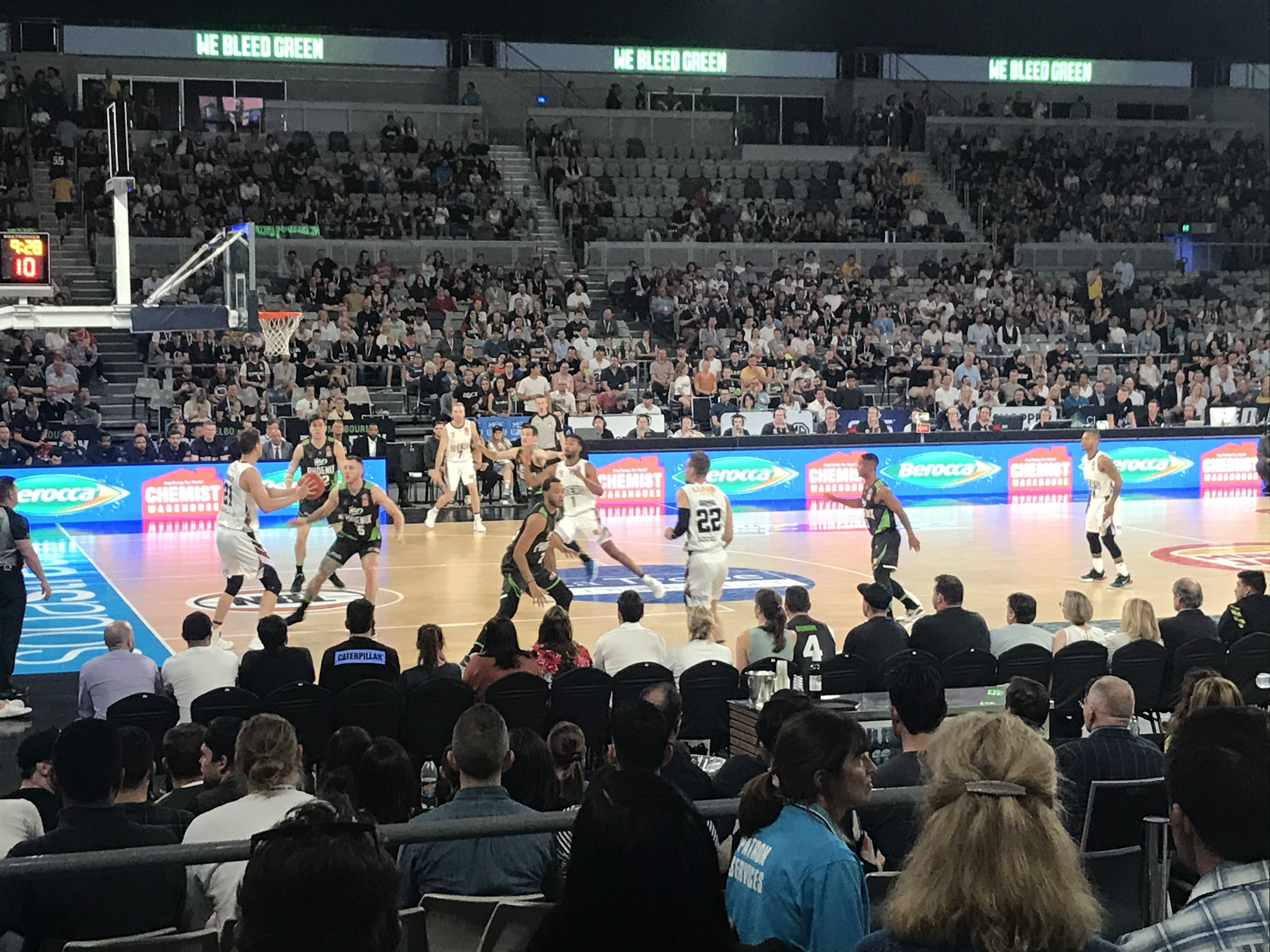
Johnson (with the ball) with the 36ers in November 2019

In October 2019, Johnson played his 250th game for the 36ers as well as his 300th in the NBL. He scored an NBL career-high 38 points in a loss to the Cairns Taipans on 18 January 2020. He went on to win the Club MVP for the fifth time.

In May 2020, Johnson's contract with the 36ers was extended until the end of the 2022–23 season. He was named co-captain for the 2020–21 season. He played his 300th game for the 36ers and 350th NBL game during the season. He averaged a career-high 19.5 points per game in 2020–21 to lead the 36ers in scoring for the sixth time. He was subsequently named Club MVP alongside Josh Giddey. He was named Club MVP for the seventh time in 2021–22.

In December 2022, Johnson played his 400th NBL game. He parted ways with the 36ers following the 2022–23 season.

==== S.E. Melbourne Phoenix (2023) ====
On 9 November 2023, Johnson signed with the South East Melbourne Phoenix as an injury replacement for Gorjok Gak. He left the Phoenix in early December after three games following Gak's return.

=== State league and overseas stints ===
Johnson is a long-time Australian state league player, having played for the Melbourne Tigers (Big V – 2008 and 2009); Willetton Tigers (SBL – 2010); South Adelaide Panthers (Premier League / NBL1 Central – 2011 and 2023), West Adelaide Bearcats (Premier League – 2013 and 2014); Sturt Sabres (Premier League – 2016); and Forestville Eagles (Premier League / NBL1 Central – 2018, 2022, 2024, 2025, 2026 and 2027). He was named to the 2025 NBL1 Central All-Star Five and the 2026 NBL1 Central All-Star Five.

Johnson won NBL1 Central championships with the Forestville Eagles in 2024 and 2026. At the 2026 NBL1 National Finals, the Eagles reached the championship game, where they were defeated 70–67 in overtime by the Gold Coast Rollers. Johnson was named to the NBL1 National Finals All-Star Five.

Additionally, Johnson has had a number of off-season stints overseas, with his first stint abroad coming following the 2013–14 NBL season when he played in Puerto Rico for Piratas de Quebradillas. He went on to play in New Zealand for the Wellington Saints in 2015, before returning to Puerto Rico in 2016 to play for Santeros de Aguada. In 2017, he played for Petrochimi Bandar Imam in Iran; in 2018, he played for Ferro Carril Oeste in Argentina; and in 2019, he played for Earthfriends Tokyo Z in Japan. He returned to Japan in March 2020 for a one-game stint with SeaHorses Mikawa.

On 8 December 2023, Johnson signed with Taiwan Beer Leopards of the T1 League for the rest of the 2023–24 season. He parted ways with the team on 15 March 2024.

== National team career ==
In 2019, Johnson made his debut for the Australian Boomers playing in the FIBA Basketball World Cup qualifiers.

In 2022, Johnson helped the Australian men's 3x3 team win gold again at the FIBA 3x3 Asia Cup in Singapore. He represented Australia in 3x3 at the 2022 Commonwealth Games in England, where the team won silver. He won silver again at the 2023 FIBA 3x3 Asia Cup and earned all-tournament team honours. He competed for Australia at the 2023 FIBA 3x3 World Cup.

== Accolades ==
On 13 January 2025, the Adelaide 36ers retired Johnson's No. 21 jersey at the Adelaide Entertainment Centre.
