= Anthony Drmic =

Australian basketball player (born 1992)

Personal information
- Born: 25 February 1992 (age 34) Melbourne, Victoria, Australia
- Listed height: 198 cm (6 ft 6 in)
- Listed weight: 91 kg (201 lb)

Career information
- College: Boise State (2011–2016)
- NBA draft: 2016: undrafted
- Playing career: 2009–2026
- Position: Shooting guard / small forward
- Number: 22, 2, 3

Career history
- 2009–2010: Australian Institute of Sport
- 2016–2020: Adelaide 36ers
- 2017: Southern Tigers
- 2018: Dandenong Rangers
- 2019: Southern Tigers
- 2020–2022: Brisbane Bullets
- 2022–2023: Adelaide 36ers
- 2023–2024: West Adelaide Bearcats
- 2023–2026: Tasmania JackJumpers
- 2025–2026: Hobart Chargers

Career highlights
- NBL champion (2024); NBL Rookie of the Year (2017); NBL1 Central champion (2023); NBL1 Central scoring champion (2024); 2× Second-team All-MWC (2013, 2014)

Anthony Drmic (born 25 February 1992) is an Australian former professional basketball player who played 11 seasons in the National Basketball League (NBL). He played college basketball for the Boise State Broncos and is their second all-time leading scorer. He led Boise State to two NCAA Tournaments during his 5 years with the Broncos. In the NBL, he was named NBL Rookie of the Year in 2017 and won an NBL championship with the Tasmania JackJumpers in 2024.

While he has represented the Australian under-19 team, he also holds a Croatian passport.

== Early life ==
Drmic was born in Melbourne, Victoria. He attended the Australian Institute of Sport (AIS) in Canberra and played for the AIS men's team in the South East Australian Basketball League (SEABL) in 2009 and 2010.

== College career ==
Drmic was recruited to the United States to play at Boise State with fellow Australian Igor Hadziomerovic. As a freshman in 2011–12, Drmic started all 29 games for the Broncos, averaging 12 points per game and set a school record for three-pointers by a freshman (57). At the end of the year, he was named honourable mention All-Mountain West Conference (MWC).

As a sophomore in 2012–13, Drmic raised his scoring to 17.7 points per game, leading the Broncos to the 2013 NCAA tournament in the process. As a junior in 2013–14, he was named second-team All-MWC for the second year in a row, as well as All-District by the United States Basketball Writers Association.

Prior to the start of his senior season, Drmic was named first-team preseason All-MWC. However, he managed just seven games in 2014–15 after sustaining an ankle injury that ruled him out for the rest of the season. He subsequently applied for a medical hardship to play in 2015–16 as a fifth-year senior.

In 2015–16, Drmic appeared in 31 games with 25 starts, averaging 13.4 points, 4.4 rebounds and 1.4 assists per game. He subsequently earned All-Mountain West Honorable Mention selection by the media. Drmic finished his college career as the school's all-time three-point record holder, the school's games record holder, two points shy of the school's all-time leading scorer, and at No. 5 on the Mountain West Conference all-time scoring list.

== Professional career ==
On 5 May 2016, Drmic signed a two-year deal with the Adelaide 36ers of the National Basketball League. Drmic appeared in 27 games for the 36ers during the 2016–17 regular season and played an important role off the bench, averaging 14 minutes per game. He averaged 5.7 points and 3.4 rebounds per game, connecting on 45.2 percent of his field goal attempts. He led all rookies in scoring and rebounding, and as a result, he was named the recipient of the NBL Rookie of the Year Award. He became the fourth 36ers player to win the award, joining Mike McKay (1985), Chris Blakemore (1993) and Aaron Bruce (2009).

In March 2017, Drmic joined the Southern Tigers of the Premier League.

On 18 December 2017, Drmic was ruled out for three weeks after suffering a medial collateral ligament sprain in his left knee three days earlier playing against the New Zealand Breakers. In 28 games for the 36ers in 2017–18, he averaged 6.6 points and 2.7 rebounds per game.

On 23 February 2018, Drmic signed with the Dandenong Rangers for the 2018 SEABL season. He was named the SEABL Player of the Week for Round 3.

On 1 May 2018, Drmic re-signed with the 36ers on a two-year deal.

In May 2019, Drmic underwent surgery to relieve him of plantar fascia pain in both his feet, thus ending his 2019 Premier League season with the Southern Tigers.

Following his completed contract with the 36ers, on 15 July 2020 Drmic signed a two-year deal with the Brisbane Bullets.

On 26 May 2022, Drmic returned to the Adelaide 36ers on a one-year deal with a mutual option for a second season. Following the 2022–23 NBL season, he joined the West Adelaide Bearcats of the NBL1 Central for the 2023 season.

On 17 April 2023, Drmic signed with the Tasmania JackJumpers for the 2023–24 NBL season. Following the season, he re-joined the Bearcats for the 2024 NBL1 Central season, where he was the league's leading scorer with 25.11 points per game.

On 13 April 2024, Drmic re-signed with the JackJumpers for the 2024–25 NBL season. He averaged 8.1 points and 4 rebounds across 28 appearances. He then joined the Hobart Chargers of the NBL1 South for the 2025 season.

On 28 February 2025, Drmic re-signed with the JackJumpers for the 2025–26 NBL season. He was subsequently named vice captain. He was sidelined in November 2025 with a back injury. He re-joined the Chargers for the 2026 NBL1 South season.

On 8 July 2026, Drmic re-signed with the JackJumpers for the 2026–27 NBL season. Due to a back injury, he was temporarily replaced in the line-up by Kody Stattmann early in the season. On 12 October 2026, he announced his retirement from the NBL due to the ongoing back injury. He finished his NBL career with 2,266 points, 1,026 rebounds and 360 assists.

== National team career ==
Drmic competed for Australia at the 2011 FIBA Under-19 World Championship, where he averaged 15.4 points per game in the nine matches and helped the Emus to a sixth-place finish.

== Personal life ==
Drmic's older brother, Frank, played in the NBL with the South East Melbourne Magic, Victoria Titans, Sydney Kings and South Dragons between 1996 and 2007, winning a championship with the Magic in 1996.
