= Noarlunga City Tigers =

Defunct basketball team from Glenelg, Australia

- Leagues: NBL; WNBL; SEABL; SA State League
- Founded: 1960s
- Dissolved: 2003
- Arena: Apollo Stadium
- Capacity: 3,000
- Location: Glenelg, Adelaide, South Australia
- Team colors: Yellow, Black
- Championships: 5 (1976, 1977, 1992, 1993, 1998) (M); 6 (1978, 1979, 1984, 1985, 1986, 1996) (W)

Noarlunga City Tigers is a former South Australian State Basketball League club, National Basketball League (NBL) team, and Women's National Basketball League (WNBL) team based in Adelaide, South Australia. Known as the Glenelg Tigers in 1979, the Tigers competed in the NBL's inaugural season before deciding to leave the league due to financial reasons. In the WNBL, the Tigers competed in the league's first 11 seasons. In the SA State League, the Tigers won 11 championships across their men's and women's teams up until 2003.

== History ==
The Glenelg Tigers were founded in the 1960s and joined the South Australian State Basketball League. The men's team won championships in 1976 and 1977 while the women's team won championships in 1978 and 1979.

When the National Basketball League was formed in 1979, the Glenelg Tigers men's team joined the West Adelaide Bearcats as the South Australian representatives. The Tigers played in and won the very first game of the inaugural NBL season on 24 February 1979, defeating the City of Sydney Astronauts 68–65 at Apollo Stadium in Adelaide. However, they managed just two more wins in the inaugural season and finished second last on the ladder. Lack of funds saw the Tigers voluntarily step out of the NBL after only one year, being replaced by the Forestville Eagles, who were in turn replaced by a composite Adelaide team which was a forerunner to the formation of the Adelaide 36ers.

In 1981, the club was renamed the Noarlunga City Tigers. The men's team competed in the first two seasons of the South East Australian Basketball League (SEABL) in 1981 and 1982 before re-joining the SA State League. The women's team went on to win State League championships in 1984, 1985, 1986 and 1996, while the men's team won championships in 1992, 1993 and 1998.

During this time, the Women's National Basketball League (WNBL) was established in 1981. The Tigers entered the WNBL for the inaugural season, playing 11 years until leaving following the 1991 season. The Tigers made the grand final in 1985, where they lost to the Coburg Giants.

In 2003, the Noarlunga City Tigers merged with the Adelaide Southern Suns to form the Southern Tigers.

== Season by season ==
NBL champions	League champions	Runners-up	Finals berth

Season	Tier	League	Regular season					Post-season	Head coach
Season	Tier	League	Finish	Played	Wins	Losses	Win %	Post-season	Head coach
Glenelg Tigers
1979	1	NBL	9th	18	3	15	.167	Did not qualify	Alan Dawe
Regular season record				18	3	15	.167	0 regular season champions	
Finals record				0	0	0	.000	0 NBL championships	

As of the end of the 1979 season
