= South Adelaide Panthers =

South Adelaide Panthers may refer to:

- South Adelaide Football Club, Australian rules football team nicknamed Panthers
- South Adelaide Panthers (basketball), member club of the South Australian state basketball league
- South Adelaide Panthers FC, association football team
