= Reynella East College =

School in Reynella East, South Australia, Australia

Location
- 63 Malbeck Drive; Reynella East, South Australia; Australia; 35.0912°S 138.5568°E

Information
- Type: Public school
- Established: 2011; 15 years ago
- Principal: Warren Symonds
- Employees: ~200
- Key people: Bob Bastian (deputy principal) Amelia Hallsworth and Riley Petersen (college captains)
- Enrolment: ~2000 (P–12)
- Houses: Bates, Florey, Rigney, Spence, and Mawson
- Sports: Easts Volleyball
- Website: reynellaec.sa.edu.au

Reynella East College is a public school located in the southern Adelaide suburb of Reynella East, South Australia. It was opened in 2011 after the formal closure of Reynella East Primary School and Reynella East High School. Reynella East College is one of the largest public schools in South Australia with over 2,000 students from preschool to Year 12.

== Notable alumni ==
- Brayden Cook, Australian rules footballer
- Sam Draper, Australian rules footballer
- Brett Maher, basketball player
- Lachlan Olbrich, basketball player
- Indy Tahau, Australian rules footballer
