= Women's Basketball Conference =

- Sport: Basketball
- Founded: 1984
- First season: 1984
- Folded: 1989
- Country: Australia
- Continent: FIBA Oceania (Oceania)

The Women's Basketball Conference (WBC) was a women's basketball league in Australia. The WBC began in 1984 and served as a second-tier national league under the Women's National Basketball League (WNBL). It operated for six seasons until it was adopted by the South East Australian Basketball League (SEABL) in 1990.

== History ==
In 1981, the Women's National Basketball League (WNBL) was established. In 1983, it was determined that two national competitions were required for the development of women's basketball in Australia. A second-tier reserves league to sit under the WNBL was established, with the Women's Basketball Conference (WBC) debuting in 1984. The inaugural WBC champions were the Hobart Hustlers, which was followed by the Canberra Capitals winning in 1985, the South Adelaide Panthers in 1986, and the WAIS Rockets in 1987. The Dandenong Rangers won at least one WBC championship in 1989.

In 1990, the WBC was adopted by the South East Australian Basketball League (SEABL) to become the inaugural SEABL women's competition.

== League championships ==
| Year | Champion | Ref |
|---|---|---|
| 1984 | Hobart Hustlers | |
| 1985 | Canberra Capitals | |
| 1986 | South Adelaide Panthers | |
| 1987 | WAIS Rockets | |
| 1988 | ? | |
| 1989 | Dandenong Rangers | (Note: The Dandenong Rangers are noted as being "three-time WBC champs" in one source but in another source are noted as having "won three CBA (SEABL) titles in a row" in the lead up to joining the WNBL in 1992.) |

== Ladders ==
Final placings for the league's first three seasons.

1984

- 1. Hobart Hustlers
- 2. Diamond Valley Eagles
- 3. Frankston Bears
- 4. AIS
- 5. Dandenong Rangers
- 6. Parramatta Wildcats
- 7. Illawarra Kittyhawks
- 8. Canberra Capitals
- 9. Newcastle Scorpions
- 10. Kingsmeadow

1985

- 1. Canberra Capitals
- 2. Dandenong Rangers
- 3. Hobart Hustlers
- 4. Sturt Cleland Blues
- 5. AIS Pumas
- 6. Diamond Valley Eagles
- 7. Illawarra Kittyhawks
- 8. South Adelaide Panthers
- 9. Newcastle Scorpions
- 10. Parramatta Wildcats
- 11. North West Traders
- 12. Manly Warringah
- 13. Eltham Wildcats
- 14. West Adelaide Bearcats
- 15. Forestville Eagles
- 16. Launceston Lions

1986

- 1. Illawarra Kittyhawks
- 2. South Adelaide Panthers
- 3. Dandenong Rangers
- 4. Sturt Cleland Blues
- 5. Parramatta Wildcats
- 6. Forestville Eagles
- 7. AIS Pumas
- 8. Diamond Valley Eagles
- 9. WAIS Perth
- 10. Von Bibras Vikings
- 11. Newcastle Scorpions
- 12. Launceston
