= Southern Tigers =

- Leagues: NBL1 Central
- Founded: 2003
- History: Southern Tigers; 2003–present
- Arena: Morphett Vale Stadium
- Location: Morphett Vale, South Australia
- Team colors: Gold, maroon, black
- President: Nathan Fisher
- Championships: 2 (2016, 2018) (M); 2 (2017, 2021) (W)
- Website: NBL1.com.au

Southern Tigers is a NBL1 Central club based in Adelaide, South Australia. The club fields both a men's and women's team. The club is a division of the overarching Southern Tigers Basketball Association (STBA), one of the major administrative basketball organisations in Adelaide's southern suburbs. The Tigers play their home games at Morphett Vale Stadium.

== Club history ==
The Southern Tigers were established in 2003 following the amalgamation of the Noarlunga City Tigers and Adelaide Southern Suns.

In the South Australian Premier League, the Tigers men won their first championship in 2016 with an 85–66 grand final victory over the Sturt Sabres. The team featured Mitch Creek and Alex Starling. In 2017, the women's team won their first Premier League championship with a 65–61 grand final victory over the North Adelaide Rockets. That year, the men's team also made the grand final, where they lost 77–64 to the West Adelaide Bearcats. In 2018, the men's team won their second Premier League championship with a 70–64 grand final victory over the Forestville Eagles.

In the 2021 NBL1 Central season, the Tigers women defeated the North Adelaide Rockets 87–77 in the grand final to claim the inaugural NBL1 Central championship and their second title overall.
