= North Adelaide Rockets =

- Leagues: NBL1 Central
- Founded: 1957
- History: SA State League / NBL1 Central: North Adelaide Rockets; 1957–present WNBL: North Adelaide Rockets; 1981–1991; SEABL: North Adelaide Rockets; 1981–1983
- Arena: The Lights Community & Sports Centre
- Location: Lightsview, South Australia
- Team colors: Red, white, grey
- President: David Durant
- Championships: SA State League / NBL1 Central: 6 (1957, 1958, 1959, 1983, 2007, 2021) (M); 21 (1957, 1961, 1964, 1965, 1967, 1969, 1970, 1971, 1975, 1976, 1977, 1982, 1988, 1989, 1990, 1991, 1994, 1998, 2004, 2014, 2018) (W); WNBL: 1 (1990)
- Website: NBL1.com.au

North Adelaide Rockets is a NBL1 Central club based in Adelaide, South Australia. The club fields both a men's and women's team. The club is a division of the overarching North Adelaide Basketball Club (NABC), the major administrative basketball organisation in the region. The Rockets play their home games at The Lights Community & Sports Centre.

== Club history ==
=== Background ===
The North Adelaide Basketball Club was established in 1939 as the Panthers Basketball Club. The club name changed to North Adelaide in 1951.

=== SA State League / NBL1 Central ===
In the first official season of the SA State League in 1957, both the Rockets men and women won the championship. The men won three straight championships with titles in 1958 and 1959.

Between 1961 and 1991, the Rockets women competed in every SA State League grand final except 1978. They won 15 championships in that time: 1961, 1964, 1965, 1967, 1969, 1970, 1971, 1975, 1976, 1977, 1982, 1988, 1989, 1990 and 1991. The Rockets women won further State League championships in 1994, 1998, 2004 and 2014, while the men won championships in 1983 and 2007.

In 2018, the Rockets women won the Premier League championship with a 79–61 grand final victory over the Forestville Eagles to cap off an unbeaten season.

In 2020, the Premier League joined the NBL1 to become the NBL1 Central. In the inaugural NBL1 Central season in 2021, the Rockets men won the championship with an 87–72 grand final victory over the Norwood Flames.

=== WNBL and SEABL ===
In 1981, the Women's National Basketball League (WNBL) was established. The Rockets entered the WNBL for the inaugural season, playing 11 years until leaving following the 1991 season. The Rockets made the grand final in 1981, where they lost to the St. Kilda Saints. They returned to the grand final in 1988, losing to the Nunawading Spectres. In 1990, the Rockets made their third grand final and defeated the Hobart Islanders 72–57 to win their only WNBL championship.

Also established in 1981 was the South East Australian Basketball League (SEABL). The Rockets men competed in the SEABL in 1981, 1982 and 1983.
