= 2021 NBL1 season =

- League: NBL1
- Sport: Basketball
- Duration: Season that was scheduled: 10 April – 5 September (Conference seasons); 10–12 September (NBL1 National Finals)

NBL1 seasons
- ← 2020 2022 →

The 2021 NBL1 season was the second season of the NBL1 after the 2020 season was cancelled due to the COVID-19 pandemic. With North and Central conferences introduced in 2020 alongside the South Conference, the NBL1 expanded further in 2021 with the inclusion of a West Conference.

The 2021 season was the first to consist of multiple conferences and National participation, however the continued impact of the pandemic led to a disrupted and incomplete end to the season.

== Background ==
The NBL1 had expanded in 2020 with North and Central conferences introduced alongside the South Conference. Following a cancelled season due to the COVID-19 pandemic, the NBL1 returned in 2021 and expanded to four conferences after partnering with Basketball Western Australia to make the State Basketball League (SBL) the new West Conference.

== Season ==
The season began on 10 April for the Central Conference, 16 April for the West Conference, 17 April for the South Conference and 14 May for the North Conference. The NBL1 National Finals were originally scheduled for Friday 10 September to Sunday 12 September in Melbourne.

All four conferences had disrupted seasons due to the COVID-19 pandemic and government restrictions. On 29 July, the NBL1 National Finals were pushed back one week to 17–19 September to allow extra time for the conferences to complete their seasons. However, on 13 August, the finals weekend was cancelled due to the uncertainty surrounding border control restrictions across Australia.

=== South ===
On 1 September, the NBL1 South season was cancelled due to the ongoing pandemic and restrictions in Victoria. With a combined 154 men's and women's games that could not be completed, it was decided to abandon the season with no champions and no individual awards. At the time of abandonment, the Knox Raiders were on top of the women's ladder and the North-West Tasmania Thunder were on top of the men's ladder.

=== North ===
On 17 August, with many regular season games still unplayed, the NBL1 North announced they would immediately conclude the regular season and advance to the finals.

The women's minor premiers were the Southern Districts Spartans with a 12–0 record while the men's minor premiers were the Logan Thunder with a 12–1 record. Cayla George of the Mackay Meteorettes was named women's MVP while Jeremy Kendle of the Logan Thunder was named men's MVP.

The women's grand final series saw the Logan Thunder defeat the Southern Districts Spartans 2–0, with 75–71 in game one and 63–61 in game two, while the men's grand final series saw the Mackay Meteors defeat the Cairns Marlins 2–0, with 81–78 in game one and 86–83 in game two. Mikhaela Cann of the Logan Thunder was named women's grand final MVP while Jerron Jamerson of the Mackay Meteors was named men's grand final MVP.

=== Central ===
The NBL1 Central completed their full 18-round schedule, with all 10 teams in both the men's and women's competitions playing 18 games.

The women's minor premiers were the Southern Tigers with a 16–2 record while the men's minor premiers were the Sturt Sabres with a 14–4 record. Teige Morrell of the Southern Tigers was named women's MVP while C. J. Turnage of the Norwood Flames was named men's MVP.

The women's grand final saw the Southern Tigers defeat the North Adelaide Rockets 87–77 while the men's grand final saw the North Adelaide Rockets defeat the Norwood Flames 87–72. Teige Morrell of the Southern Tigers was named women's grand final MVP while Sunday Dech of the North Adelaide Rockets was named men's grand final MVP.

=== West ===
The NBL1 West saw the women's competition complete their season with each team playing 18 games, but due to multiple games being cancelled and not rescheduled, the men's competition had some teams fail to play all 22 games.

The women's minor premiers were the Willetton Tigers with a 15–3 record while the men's minor premiers were the Perry Lakes Hawks with an 18–4 record. Alexandra Sharp of the Willetton Tigers was named women's MVP while Nic Pozoglou of the Cockburn Cougars was named men's MVP.

The women's grand final saw the Willetton Tigers defeat the Joondalup Wolves 65–54 while the men's grand final saw the Perry Lakes Hawks defeat the Rockingham Flames 92–82. Alexandra Sharp of the Willetton Tigers was named women's grand final MVP while Andrew Ferguson of the Perry Lakes Hawks was named men's grand final MVP.

=== Champions summary ===
==== Women ====
Conference	Champion	Result	Runner-up
South	Season abandoned		
North	Logan Thunder	2 – 0 (75–71, 63–61)	Southern Districts Spartans
Central	Southern Tigers	87 – 77	North Adelaide Rockets
West	Willetton Tigers	65 – 54	Joondalup Wolves

==== Men ====
Conference	Champion	Result	Runner-up
South	Season abandoned		
North	Mackay Meteors	2 – 0 (81–78, 86–83)	Cairns Marlins
Central	North Adelaide Rockets	87 – 72	Norwood Flames
West	Perry Lakes Hawks	92 – 82	Rockingham Flames
