= South Adelaide Panthers (basketball) =

- Leagues: NBL1 Central
- Founded: 1957
- History: SA State League / NBL1 Central: South Adelaide Panthers; 1957–present WBC: South Adelaide Panthers; 1985–1989; SEABL: South Adelaide Panthers; 1981
- Arena: Marion Basketball Stadium
- Location: Marion, South Australia
- Team colors: Navy, white, red
- President: June McKenzie
- General manager: Simon Crowden
- Championships: SA State League / NBL1 Central: 11 (1963, 1965, 1966, 1969, 1973, 1987, 1989, 1991, 1995, 1997, 2022) (M); 1 (1958) (W); WBC: 1 (1986)
- Website: NBL1.com.au

South Adelaide Panthers is a NBL1 Central club based in Adelaide, South Australia. The club fields both a men's and women's team. The club is a division of the overarching South Adelaide Basketball Club (SABC), one of the major administrative basketball organisations in Adelaide's southern suburbs. The Panthers play their home games at Marion Basketball Stadium.

== Club history ==
=== Background ===
The South Adelaide Basketball Club (SABC) was formed in 1952. It was one of the foundation clubs in the sport of basketball in South Australia.

=== SA State League / NBL1 Central ===
The first official season of the SA State League took place in 1957. The Panthers women were grand finalists in the first two seasons, winning the championship in 1958. The men's team won their first SA State League championship in 1963, going on to win nine more in 1965, 1966, 1969, 1973, 1987, 1989, 1991, 1995 and 1997. The women's team saw little success in the SA State League following 1958, with their only other grand final appearance coming in 2003.

In 2022, the men's team won the NBL1 Central Grand Final to claim their first championship since 1997. The men's team returned to the NBL1 Central Grand Final in 2024, where they lost 92–90 to the Forestville Eagles. The men's team returned to the NBL1 Central Grand Final in 2026, where they lost 77–58 to the Forestville Eagles.

=== SEABL and WBC ===
In 1981, the South East Australian Basketball League (SEABL) was established, with the Panthers competing in the inaugural season.

In 1984, the Women's Basketball Conference (WBC) was established. The Panthers joined the WBC in 1985 and won the WBC championship in 1986. The 1986 WBC squad was coached by Phil Smyth. The WBC became the SEABL women's competition in 1990, but the Panthers women did not join the SEABL.

== Retired numbers ==
In March 2015, the Panthers retired the playing numbers of three of the club's greatest men's players: Michael Ah Matt (#8), Scott Ninnis (#9) and Mark Davis (#33). The three jerseys hang in the rafters at Marion Stadium.

Ah Matt in 1963 led the Panthers to the first of their 10 titles while twice winning the St George Trophy—now the Frank Angove Medal—as the fairest and most brilliant player in South Australia, under 21. Ninnis arguably is one of the most successful Australian basketball players of all time, having won titles at every senior level. He was a star for South Adelaide, winning the 1995 Woollacott Medal as the state's fairest and most brilliant player and winning championships with the club in 1987, 1995 and 1997. American forward Davis was brought to Adelaide by South in 1985 when the club was looking for an import and was told there was one "killing it" in New Zealand. Davis won five championships with the Panthers and a record five Woollacott Medals.
