= List of NBL1 Central champions =

The champion teams of the NBL1 Central, previously known as the Premier League, are determined annually by a grand final championship day hosted by Basketball South Australia.

In 2024, the league set a record crowd attending the Grand Finals at the Adelaide Arena. As a result, Basketball South Australia moved the grand final host venue to the Adelaide Entertainment Centre in 2025. Adelaide Entertainment Centre continued as the grand final host venue in 2026.

== Champions ==
=== Results by year ===
Year	Men's Champion	Result	Men's Runner-up	Women's Champion	Result	Women's Runner-up
1957	North Adelaide Rockets	71–61	West Adelaide Bearcats	North Adelaide Rockets	50–46	South Adelaide Panthers
1958	North Adelaide Rockets	75–55	West Torrens Eagles	South Adelaide Panthers	60–58	West Torrens Eagles
1959	North Adelaide Rockets	63–37	West Torrens Eagles	Vikings	76–46	West Torrens Eagles
1960	A.S.K. (Adelaide Giants)	88–67	Budapest	Vikings	60–24	West Torrens Eagles
1961	Budapest	58–52	A.S.K. (Adelaide Giants)	North Adelaide Rockets	34–31	Vikings
1962	Budapest	65–62	A.S.K. (Adelaide Giants)	Vikings	39–35	North Adelaide Rockets
1963	South Adelaide Panthers	51–44	Budapest	Vikings	39–24	North Adelaide Rockets
1964	A.S.K. (Adelaide Giants)	68–56	South Adelaide Panthers	North Adelaide Rockets	46–9	Vikings
1965	South Adelaide Panthers	68–55	North Adelaide Rockets	North Adelaide Rockets	45–27	K-Jets
1966	South Adelaide Panthers	75–68	A.S.K. (Adelaide Giants)	Adelaide	44–28	North Adelaide Rockets
1967	West Adelaide Bearcats	60–56	South Adelaide Panthers	North Adelaide Rockets	52–42	Adelaide
1968	West Adelaide Bearcats	64–52	South Adelaide Panthers	West Adelaide Bearcats	38–36	North Adelaide Rockets
1969	South Adelaide Panthers	65–64	West Adelaide Bearcats	North Adelaide Rockets	62–43	West Adelaide Bearcats
1970	West Adelaide Bearcats	59–46	West Torrens Eagles	North Adelaide Rockets	54–50	West Adelaide Bearcats
1971	West Adelaide Bearcats	83–60	Glenelg Tigers	North Adelaide Rockets	48–46	West Adelaide Bearcats
1972	West Adelaide Bearcats	99–67	Glenelg Tigers	West Torrens Eagles	40–38	North Adelaide Rockets
1973	South Adelaide Panthers	68–64	West Adelaide Bearcats	West Torrens Eagles	63–57	West Adelaide Bearcats
1974	West Torrens Eagles	80–70	West Adelaide Bearcats	Sturt Sabres	53–40	North Adelaide Rockets
1975	West Adelaide Bearcats	96–69	Glenelg Tigers	North Adelaide Rockets	75–54	West Torrens Eagles
1976	Glenelg Tigers	66–64	West Adelaide Bearcats	North Adelaide Rockets	57–56	West Torrens Eagles
1977	Glenelg Tigers	100–70	West Adelaide Bearcats	North Adelaide Rockets	67–65	Glenelg Tigers
1978	West Adelaide Bearcats	95–71	South Adelaide Panthers	Glenelg Tigers	64–61	Norwood Flames
1979	West Adelaide Bearcats	66–58	West Torrens Eagles	Glenelg Tigers	64–61	North Adelaide Rockets
1980	West Adelaide Bearcats	90–76	Sturt Sabres	West Adelaide Bearcats	68–67	North Adelaide Rockets
1981	West Adelaide Bearcats	63–59	Sturt Sabres	Sturt Sabres	59–57	North Adelaide Rockets
1982	West Adelaide Bearcats	97–84	Forestville Eagles	North Adelaide Rockets	65–64	West Adelaide Bearcats
1983	North Adelaide Rockets	68–65	West Adelaide Bearcats	West Adelaide Bearcats	77–69	North Adelaide Rockets
1984	Central Districts Lions	84–78	North Adelaide Rockets	Noarlunga City Tigers	84–66	North Adelaide Rockets
1985	Sturt Sabres	90–82	West Adelaide Bearcats	Noarlunga City Tigers	69–67	North Adelaide Rockets
1986	Sturt Sabres	87–84	West Adelaide Bearcats	Noarlunga City Tigers	74–63	North Adelaide Rockets
1987	South Adelaide Panthers	104–85	Forestville Eagles	West Adelaide Bearcats	58–44	North Adelaide Rockets
1988	West Adelaide Bearcats	102–88	South Adelaide Panthers	North Adelaide Rockets	78–61	Noarlunga City Tigers
1989	South Adelaide Panthers	111–107	Forestville Eagles	North Adelaide Rockets	60–57	West Adelaide Bearcats
1990	Forestville Eagles	94–88	South Adelaide Panthers	North Adelaide Rockets	59–41	West Adelaide Bearcats
1991	South Adelaide Panthers	94–82	West Adelaide Bearcats	North Adelaide Rockets	81–60	West Adelaide Bearcats
1992	Noarlunga City Tigers	87–79	Sturt Sabres	West Adelaide Bearcats	63–59	Norwood Flames
1993	Noarlunga City Tigers	82–64	Murray Bridge Bullets	West Adelaide Bearcats	46–44	Noarlunga City Tigers
1994	West Adelaide Bearcats	84–57	Murray Bridge Bullets	North Adelaide Rockets	66–62	Noarlunga City Tigers
1995	South Adelaide Panthers	89–84	Sturt Sabres	Norwood Flames	57–50	Noarlunga City Tigers
1996	West Adelaide Bearcats	79–78	Noarlunga City Tigers	Noarlunga City Tigers	63–47	North Adelaide Rockets
1997	South Adelaide Panthers	92–78	Noarlunga City Tigers	Norwood Flames	67–64	Woodville Warriors
1998	Noarlunga City Tigers	105–88	South Adelaide Panthers	North Adelaide Rockets	75–70	Norwood Flames
1999	Norwood Flames	96–69	North Adelaide Rockets	Norwood Flames	97–70	North Adelaide Rockets
2000	Woodville Warriors	98–86	Forestville Eagles	Norwood Flames	77–47	North Adelaide Rockets
2001	Sturt Sabres	101–88	West Adelaide Bearcats	Forestville Eagles	84–70	Norwood Flames
2002	Sturt Sabres	126–116	Forestville Eagles	Sturt Sabres	92–81	Forestville Eagles
2003	Forestville Eagles	109–107	North Adelaide Rockets	Forestville Eagles	74–51	South Adelaide Panthers
2004	Eastern Mavericks	93–80	Woodville Warriors	North Adelaide Rockets	83–57	Forestville Eagles
2005	Woodville Warriors	85–82	Forestville Eagles	Forestville Eagles	73–66	North Adelaide Rockets
2006	Forestville Eagles	102–89	Sturt Sabres	Sturt Sabres	76–55	Forestville Eagles
2007	North Adelaide Rockets	85–72	Norwood Flames	West Adelaide Bearcats	77–57	Norwood Flames
2008	Norwood Flames	89–88	Forestville Eagles	Sturt Sabres	72–57	North Adelaide Rockets
2009	Norwood Flames	94–84	Sturt Sabres	Forestville Eagles	74–49	Sturt Sabres
2010	Sturt Sabres	91–82	West Adelaide Bearcats	Forestville Eagles	73–54	West Adelaide Bearcats
2011	Forestville Eagles	82–68	Norwood Flames	Forestville Eagles	70–58	Norwood Flames
2012	Forestville Eagles	86–78	Sturt Sabres	Norwood Flames	87–67	North Adelaide Rockets
2013	Forestville Eagles	81–73	West Adelaide Bearcats	Norwood Flames	71–52	North Adelaide Rockets
2014	Woodville Warriors	80–78	West Adelaide Bearcats	North Adelaide Rockets	73–70	Sturt Sabres
2015	Norwood Flames	81–73	Sturt Sabres	Norwood Flames	59–42	North Adelaide Rockets
2016	Southern Tigers	85–66	Sturt Sabres	Norwood Flames	63–45	West Adelaide Bearcats
2017	West Adelaide Bearcats	77–64	Southern Tigers	Southern Tigers	65–61	North Adelaide Rockets
2018	Southern Tigers	70–64	Forestville Eagles	North Adelaide Rockets	79–61	Forestville Eagles
2019	Forestville Eagles	107–90	Mount Gambier Pioneers	Forestville Eagles	61–58	Sturt Sabres
2020	Season cancelled					
2021	North Adelaide Rockets	87–72	Norwood Flames	Southern Tigers	87–77	North Adelaide Rockets
2022	South Adelaide Panthers	88–58	Woodville Warriors	West Adelaide Bearcats	82–75	Sturt Sabres
2023	West Adelaide Bearcats	106–95	Forestville Eagles	Norwood Flames	80–65	Sturt Sabres
2024	Forestville Eagles	92–90	South Adelaide Panthers	Central Districts Lions	79–67	Forestville Eagles
2025	West Adelaide Bearcats	83–73	Central Districts Lions	Woodville Warriors	73–65	Sturt Sabres
2026	Forestville Eagles	77–58	South Adelaide Panthers	Sturt Sabres	76–70	West Adelaide Bearcats

=== Results by teams ===
Team	Total Titles	Men's		Women's		Notes
Team	Total Titles	Titles	Winning seasons	Titles	Winning seasons	Notes
North Adelaide Rockets	27	6	1957, 1958, 1959, 1983, 2007, 2021	21	1957, 1961, 1964, 1965, 1967, 1969, 1970, 1971, 1975, 1976, 1977, 1982, 1988, 1989, 1990, 1991, 1994, 1998, 2004, 2014, 2018	Won both inaugural titles in 1957.
West Adelaide Bearcats	25	17	1967, 1968, 1970, 1971, 1972, 1975, 1978, 1979, 1980, 1981, 1982, 1988, 1994, 1996, 2017, 2023, 2025	8	1968, 1980, 1983, 1987, 1992, 1993, 2007, 2022	
West Torrens / Forestville Eagles	19	10	1974, 1990, 2003, 2006, 2011, 2012, 2013, 2019, 2024, 2026	9	1972, 1973, 2001, 2003, 2005, 2009, 2010, 2011, 2019	
Norwood Flames	13	4	1999, 2008, 2009, 2015	9	1995, 1997, 1999, 2000, 2012, 2013, 2015, 2016, 2023	
South Adelaide Panthers	12	11	1963, 1965, 1966, 1969, 1973, 1987, 1989, 1991, 1995, 1997, 2022	1	1958	
Glenelg / Noarlunga City Tigers	11	5	1976, 1977, 1992, 1993, 1998	6	1978, 1979, 1984, 1985, 1986, 1996	
Sturt Sabres	11	5	1985, 1986, 2001, 2002, 2010	6	1974, 1981, 2002, 2006, 2008, 2026	
Vikings	4	0		4	1959, 1960, 1962, 1963	
Woodville Warriors	4	3	2000, 2005, 2014	1	2025	
Southern Tigers	4	2	2016, 2018	2	2017, 2021	
A.S.K. (Adelaide Giants)	2	2	1960, 1964	0		
Budapest	2	2	1961, 1962	0		
Central Districts Lions	2	1	1984	1	2024	
Adelaide	1	0		1	1966	
Eastern Mavericks	1	1	2004	0		
