= Forestville Eagles =

- Leagues: NBL1 Central
- Founded: 1957
- History: SA State League / NBL1 Central: West Torrens Eagles; 1957–1980; Forestville Eagles; 1981–present NBL: West Torrens Eagles; 1980; Forestville Eagles; 1981; WBC: Forestville Eagles; 1985–1989
- Arena: Wayville Sports Centre
- Location: Wayville, South Australia
- Team colors: Blue & yellow
- President: Milan Djurasevich
- Championships: SA State League / NBL1 Central: 10 (1974, 1990, 2003, 2006, 2011, 2012, 2013, 2019, 2024, 2026) (M); 9 (1972, 1973, 2001, 2003, 2005, 2009, 2010, 2011, 2019) (W)
- Website: NBL1.com.au

Forestville Eagles is a NBL1 Central club based in Adelaide, South Australia. The club fields both a men's and women's team. The club is a division of the overarching Forestville Eagles Basketball Club (FEBC), the major administrative basketball organisation in the region. The Eagles play their home games at the Wayville Sports Centre.

== Club history ==
=== Background ===
In the late 1940s, a men's basketball team named West Torrens emerged from the Mellor Park Tennis Club in Lockleys. The West Torrens Basketball Club (WTBC) was established in 1953 and in 1958, amalgamated with the Adelaide Women's club. West Torrens were known as the Eagles. They remained with that name until 1980 when the club took over the basketball stadium located in Forestville and changed the name to the Forestville Eagles Basketball Club. The club moved from Forestville Stadium to Wayville Sports Centre in 1999.

In 2023, the State Basketball Centre was opened following a four-court extension to Wayville Sports Centre, taking the total number of indoor courts at the complex to seven.

=== SA State League / NBL1 Central ===
The first official season of the SA State League took place in 1957. In 1958 and 1959, West Torrens were in back-to-back men's grand finals; both resulted in losses to the North Adelaide Rockets. The West Torrens women's team also made grand finals in 1958, 1959 and 1960, all resulting in losses.

In 1966, Adelaide women won the SA State League. The same team were runners-up in 1967. Following this, Adelaide's coach Jim Madigan submitted his team as West Torrens going forward.

In 1972, the women's team collected the club's first ever championship, before defending their title in 1973. They went on to finish runners-up in 1975 and 1976. The West Torrens men made three grand finals in 1970, 1974 and 1979, with 1974 seeing the Eagles collect their first ever men's championship. In 1982, the Forestville men lost in the grand final to the West Adelaide Bearcats. After further grand final defeats in 1987 and 1989, Forestville claimed their second men's title in 1990 with a 94–88 grand final win over the South Adelaide Panthers.

The women's team claimed their first title under the Forestville moniker in 2001, before winning two more titles in 2003 and 2005. The men also claimed championships in 2003 and 2006. Between 2009 and 2011, the women claimed a three-peat, before the men claimed their own three-peat between 2011 and 2013. In 2019, both teams were crowned Premier League champions.

In 2023, the men's team lost in the NBL1 Central grand final to the West Adelaide Bearcats. In 2024, both the men and women made the grand final, with the men winning the championship and the women finishing as runners-up. In 2026, the men's team returned to the NBL1 Central grand final, where they defeated the South Adelaide Panthers 77–58 to win the championship. At the 2026 NBL1 National Finals, the Eagles men reached the championship game, where they were defeated 70–67 in overtime by the Gold Coast Rollers.

=== NBL and WBC ===
The West Torrens Eagles competed in the National Basketball League (NBL) in 1980. A name change saw the Forestville Eagles compete in the 1981 NBL season. In 1982, Forestville's late withdrawal from the NBL when it no longer could afford to continue in the competition alongside West Adelaide, led to the state association inviting the rest of its domestic clubs to form a composite "Adelaide" team. To separate the identity from local club Adelaide Giants, the new composite outfit was called Adelaide City Eagles for the 1982 NBL season.

In 1984, the Women's Basketball Conference (WBC) was established. The Eagles joined the WBC in 1985. The WBC became the South East Australian Basketball League (SEABL) women's competition in 1990, but the Eagles women did not join the SEABL.

== NBL Season by season ==
NBL champions	League champions	Runners-up	Finals berth

Season	Tier	League	Regular season					Post-season	Head coach
Season	Tier	League	Finish	Played	Wins	Losses	Win %	Post-season	Head coach
West Torrens Eagles
1980	1	NBL	11th	22	6	16	.273	Did not qualify	Alan Hughes
Forestville Eagles
1981	1	NBL	12th	22	6	16	.273	Did not qualify	Albert Leslie; Reg Biddings
Regular season record				44	12	32	.273	0 regular season champions	
Finals record				0	0	0	.000	0 NBL championships	

As of the end of the 1981 season

== Gallery ==
Wayville Sports Centre, part of the State Basketball Centre complex and home of the Forestville Eagles

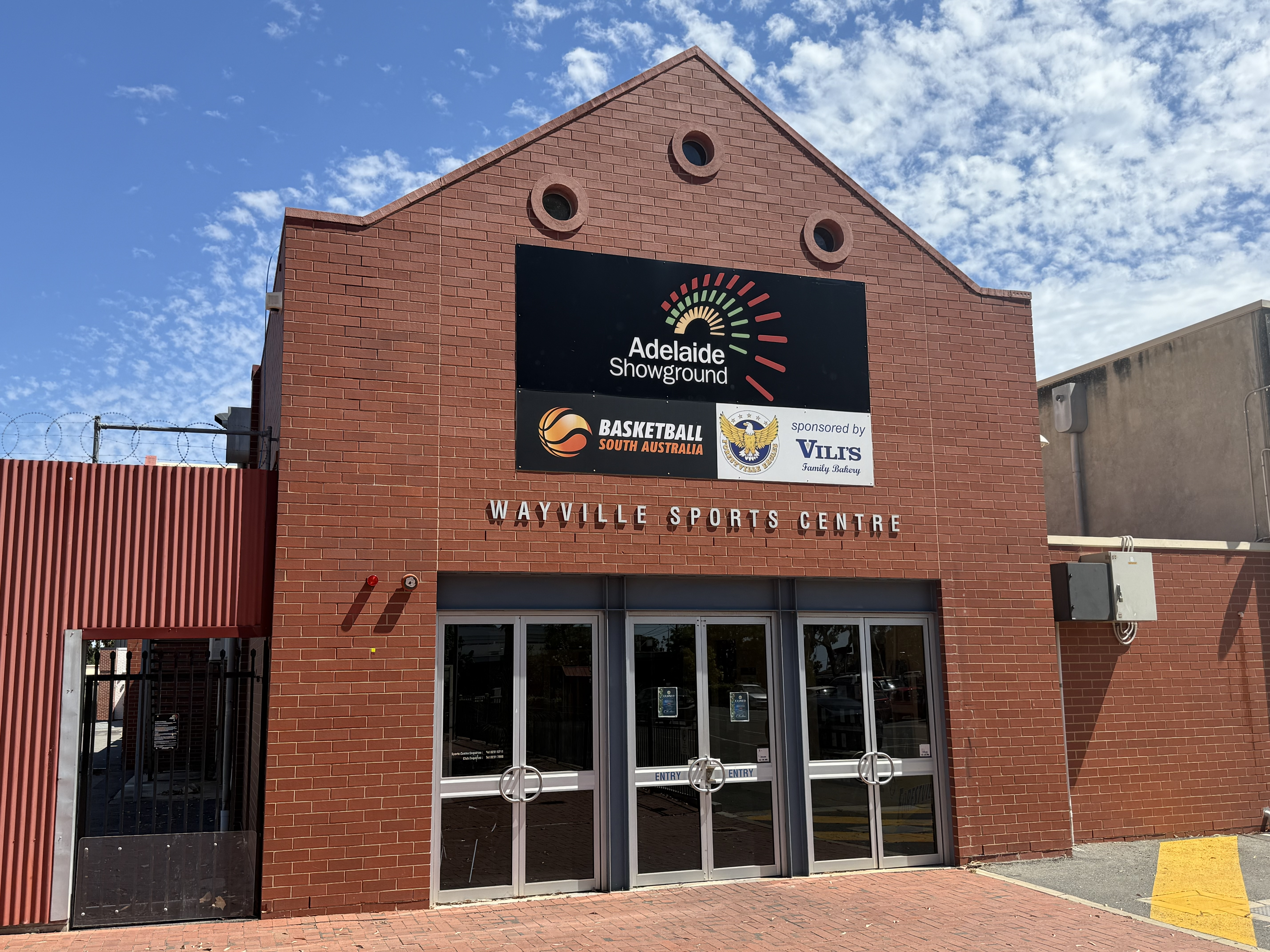
Wayville Sports Centre main entrance

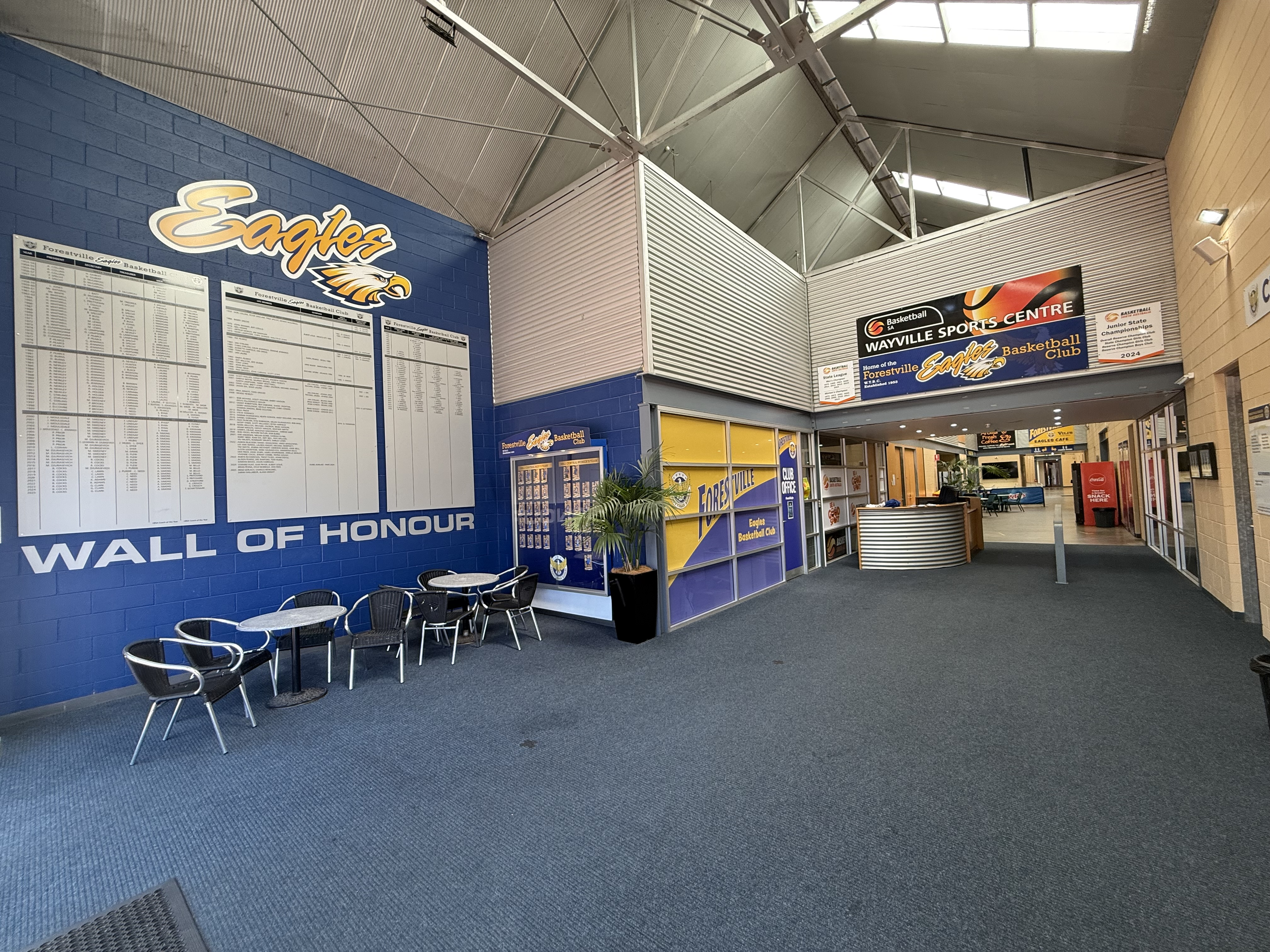
Wayville Sports Centre foyer

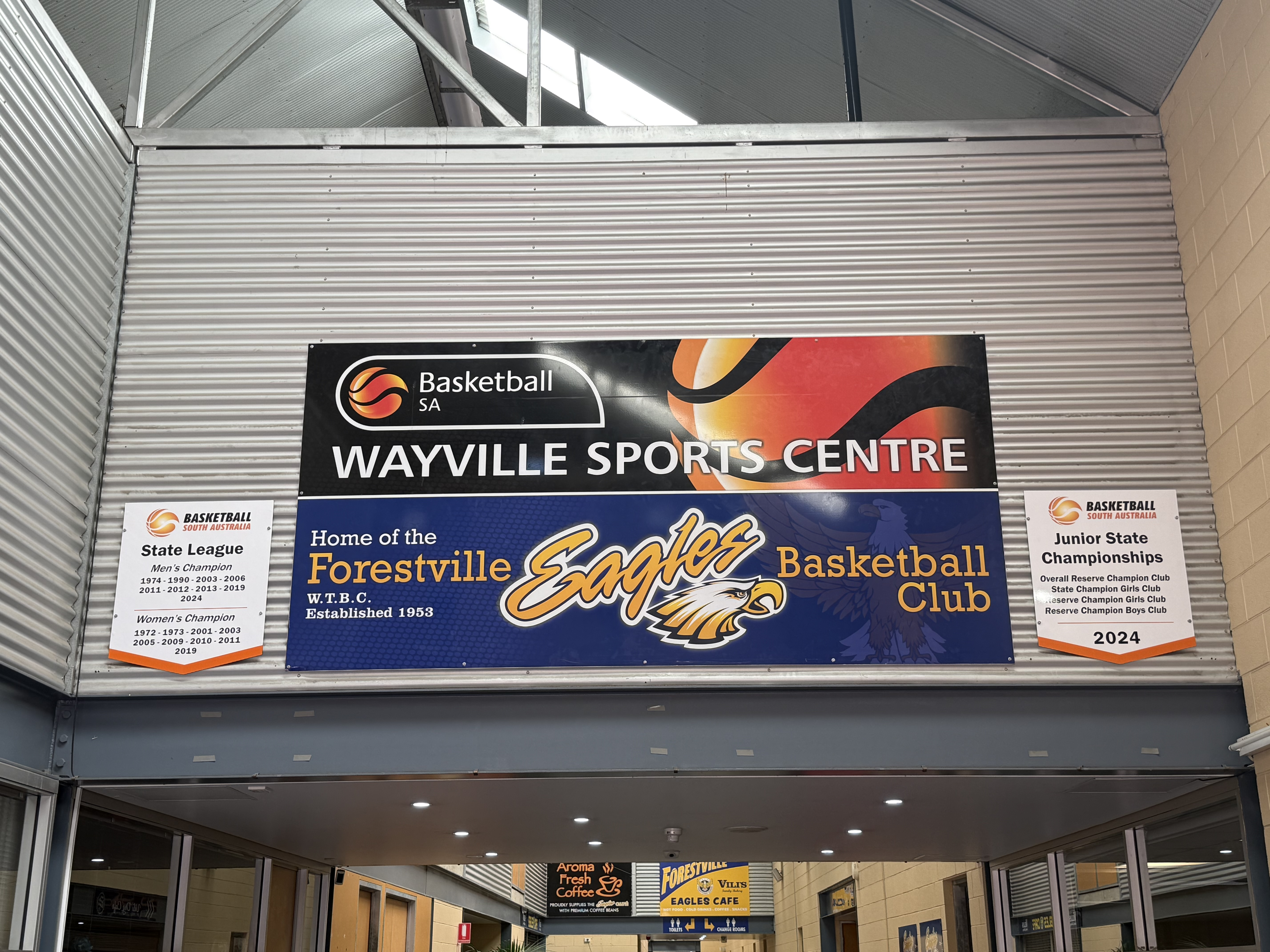
Interior signs and plaques

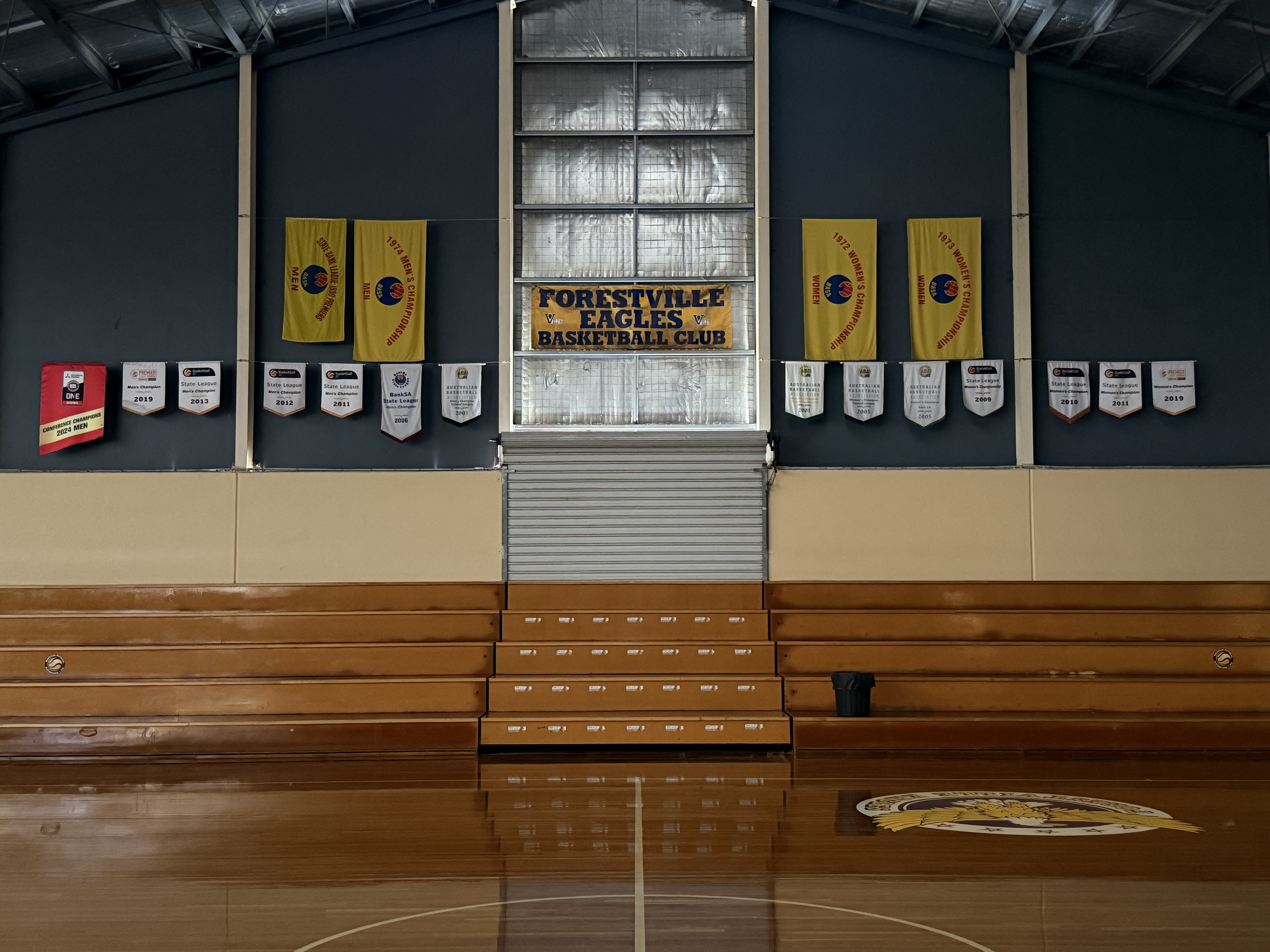
Eagles' championship banners

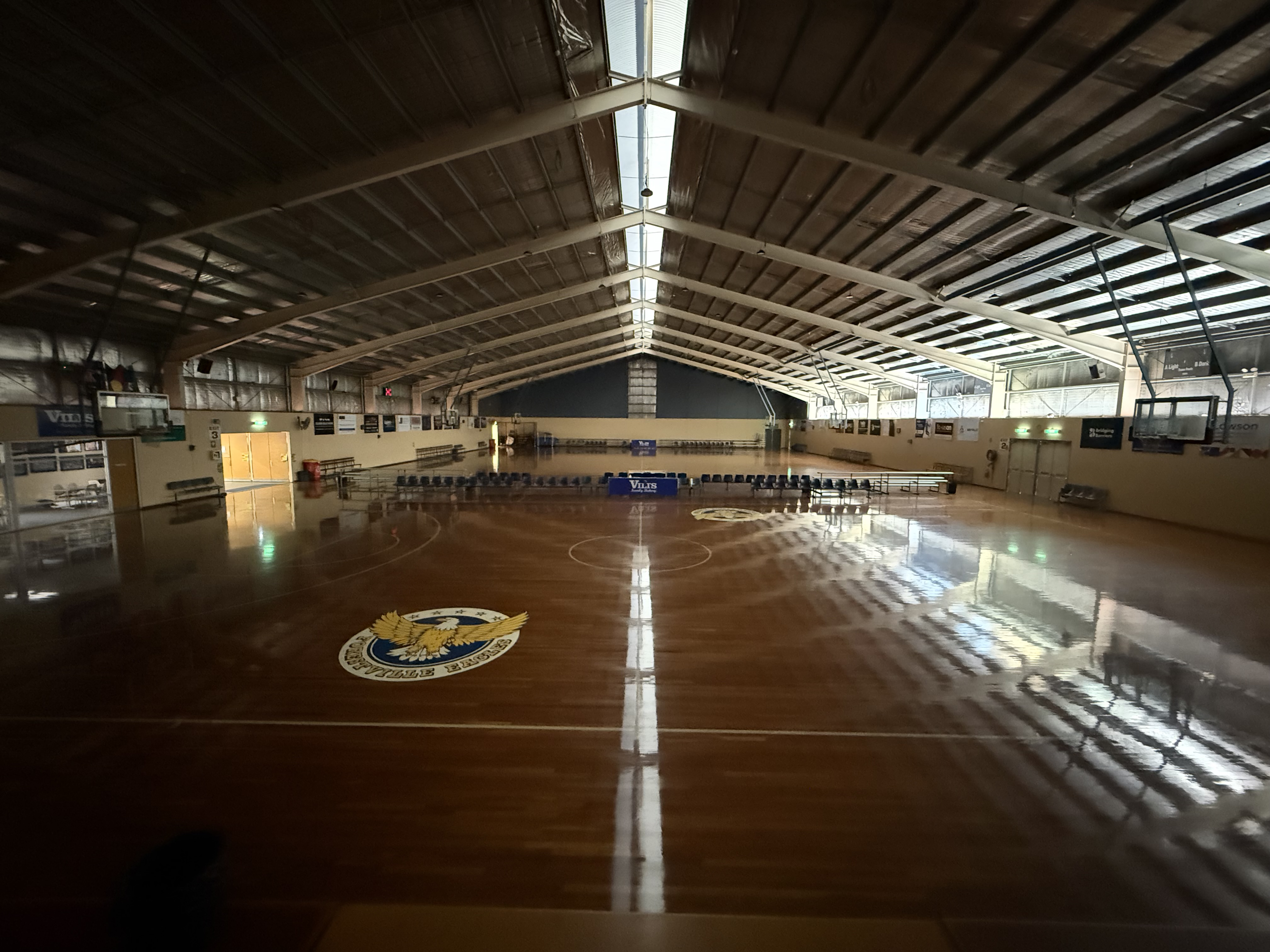
Three courts
