= NBL1 Central =

Semi-professional basketball league of South Australia

- Current season, competition or edition: 2026 NBL1 season
- Formerly: SA State League; 1957–1997; Central Conference of the ABA / Central ABL; 1998–2014; Premier League; 2015–2019
- Sport: Basketball
- Founded: 1957
- First season: 1957
- No. of teams: M: 10; W: 10
- Country: Australia
- Continent: FIBA Oceania (Oceania)
- Most recent champions: M: Forestville Eagles (10th title); W: Sturt Sabers (6th title)
- Most titles: M: West Adelaide Bearcats (17 titles); W: North Adelaide Rockets (21 titles)
- Sponsor: Mitsubishi Motors
- Website: NBL1.com.au/Central

NBL1 Central, formerly the Premier League, is a semi-professional basketball league in South Australia, comprising both a men's and women's competition. In 2020, Basketball South Australia partnered with the National Basketball League (NBL) to bring NBL1 to South Australia. NBL1 replaced the former Premier League to create more professional pathways and opportunities for males and females playing basketball in South Australia. As a result, the Premier League became the central conference of NBL1.

== History ==
The South Australian Metropolitan Basketball Association was founded in 1936. This organisation later became known as the Basketball Association of South Australia (BASA). The sport of basketball in the state of South Australia was boosted after World War II by the influx of emigrants from Europe especially from the Baltic countries. In 2006, Basketball South Australia was formed following the dissolution of BASA.

The first official South Australian State Basketball League season took place in 1957. At the time, there was a summer season and a winter season. The winter season soon took pre-eminence and was eventually referred to as the State Championship season. During the 1990s, the league was known under sponsor names "State Bank League" and "BankSA League".

In 1998, the SA State League joined the Continental Basketball Association (CBA) as the association's Central Conference. In 1999, the CBA was restructured as the Australian Basketball Association (ABA). The ABA would not allow South Australia maintaining its competition as a "state league" and required two alterations: a name change and some representation in the competition from outside Adelaide. The competition was initially titled Central Conference of the Australian Basketball Association and later the Central Australian Basketball League (Central ABL) name was adopted and remained in place until 2014, despite the ABA folding in 2008.

The league was rebranded as Premier League in 2015.

In February 2020, Basketball South Australia and the National Basketball League (NBL) announced a new partnership to bring NBL1 to South Australia, with the Premier League being renamed NBL1 Central and becoming the central conference of the NBL1. However, due to the COVID-19 pandemic, the 2020 season was cancelled. The NBL1 Central debuted in the 2021 season.

== Current clubs ==
Colours	Club	City	State	Arena	Joined NBL1 Central
	Central Districts Lions	Adelaide	South Australia	STARplex	2020
	Eastern Mavericks	Mount Barker	South Australia	St Francis de Sales Community Sports Centre	2020
	Forestville Eagles	Adelaide	South Australia	State Basketball Centre	2020
	North Adelaide Rockets	Adelaide	South Australia	The Lights Community and Sports Centre	2020
	Norwood Flames	Adelaide	South Australia	The ARC	2020
	South Adelaide Panthers	Adelaide	South Australia	Marion Basketball Stadium	2020
	Southern Tigers	Adelaide	South Australia	Morphett Vale Stadium	2020
	Sturt Sabres	Adelaide	South Australia	Springbank Secondary College	2020
	West Adelaide Bearcats	Adelaide	South Australia	Port Adelaide Recreation Centre	2020
	Woodville Warriors	Adelaide	South Australia	St Clair Recreation Centre	2020

== Season by Season Results ==
Year	League	Champions	Result	Runner Ups	Grand Final MVP	Minor Premier
2026	Women	Sturt Sabres	76-70	West Adelaide Bearcats	Nicola Mathews - Sturt Sabres	West Adelaide Bearcats
2026	Men	Forestville Eagles	77-58	South Adelaide Panthers	Alex Starling - Forestville Eagles	Forestville Eagles
2025	Women	Woodville Warriors	73-65	Sturt Sabres	Laura Erikstrup - Woodville Warriors	Forestville Eagles
2025	Men	West Adelaide Bearcats	83-73	Central District Lions	Cameron Huefner - West Adelaide Bearcats	Forestville Eagles
2024	Women	Central District Lions	79-67	Forestville Eagles	Taylah Levy - Central District Lions	Sturt Sabres
2024	Men	Forestville Eagles	92-90	South Adelaide Panthers	Greg Mays - Forestville Eagles	South Adelaide Panthers
2023	Women	Norwood Flames	80-65	Sturt Sabres	Alex Wilson - Norwood Flames	Sturt Sabres
2023	Men	West Adelaide Bearcats	106-95	Forestville Eagles	Lachlan Olbrich - West Adelaide Bearcats	West Adelaide Bearcats
2022	Women	West Adelaide Bearcats	82-75	Sturt Sabres	Madelynn Utti - West Adelaide Bearcats	West Adelaide Bearcats
2022	Men	South Adelaide Panthers	88-58	Woodville Warriors	Alex Starling - South Adelaide Panthers	Woodville Warriors
2021	Women	Southern Tigers	87-77	North Adelaide Rockets	Teige Morrel - Southern Tigers	Southern Tigers
2021	Men	North Adelaide Rockets	87-72	Norwood Flames	Sunday Dech - North Adelaide Rockets	Sturt Sabres

== League Awards ==
Year	League	Lorraine Eiler (Halls) and Wollacott Medalist	League MVP	Best Defensive Player	All Star 5	Coach of the Year	Merv Harris and Frank Angrove Medalist
2026	Women	Cali Clark - Norwood Flames	Tayla Brazel - Sturt Sabres	Chloe Hodges - West Adelaide Bearcats	Allysyn Becki - Norwood Flames Morgan Yaeger - West Adelaide Bearcats Tayla Brazel - Sturt Sabres Chloe Hodges - West Adelaide Bearcats Cali Clark - Norwood Flames	Matthew Clarke - West Adelaide Bearcats	Tayla Brazel - Sturt Sabres
2026	Men	Jeremy Smith - South Adelaide Panthers	Jeremy Smith - South Adelaide Panthers	Alex Starling - Forestville Eagles	Jordan Forbes - Forestville Eagles Jeremy Smith - South Adelaide Panthers Lloyd McVeigh - South Adelaide Panthers Thomas Kurowski - Norwood Flames Daniel Johnson - Forestville Eagles	Jakob Dorricott - Sturt Sabres	Oskar Jones - North Adelaide Rockets
2025	Women	Olivia Levicki - West Adelaide Bearcats	Jasmin Fejo - Woodville Warriors	Jasmin Fejo - Woodville Warriors	Jasmin Fejo - Woodville Warriors Jordyn Freer - North Adelaide Rockets Samantha Simons - Forestville Eagles Ke'Shunan James - Norwood Flames Olivia Levicki - West Adelaide Bearcats	Mark Billington - West Adelaide Bearcats	Keira Gardiner - South Adelaide Panthers
2025	Men	Keanu Rasmussen - West Adelaide Bearcats	Keanu Rasmussen - West Adelaide Bearcats	Joe Jackson - Woodville Warriors	Keanu Rasmussen - West Adelaide Bearcats Sharif Black - Sturt Sabres Christian Brandon - South Adelaide Panthers Daniel Johnson - Forestville Eagles Efemena Abogidi - Central District Lions	Rupert Sapwell - Central District Lions	Keanu Rasmussen - West Adelaide Bearcats
2024	Women	Casey Samuels - Central District Lions	Brittany Hodges - South Adelaide Panthers	Zoe Walker-Roberts - Sturt Sabres	Taylah Levy - Central District Lions Brooke Basham - North Adelaide Rockets Casey Samuels - Central District Lions Madison Freer - Forestville Eagles Brittany Hodges - South Adelaide Panthers	Tim Shortt - Sturt Sabres	Madison Freer - Forestville Eagles
2024	Men	Alex Starling - South Adelaide Panthers	Alex Starling - South Adelaide Panthers	Alex Starling - South Adelaide Panthers	Jordan Forbes - Sturt Sabres Branden Jenkins - Central District Lions Jacob Rigoni - Sturt Sabres Alex Starling - South Adelaide Panthers Greg Mays - Forestville Eagles	Paul Rigoni - Sturt Sabres	Akoldah Gak - West Adelaide Bearcats
2023	Women	Mikayla Williams - Sturt Sabres	Brooke Basham - North Adelaide Rockets	Tayla Brazel - Sturt Sabres	Morgan Yaeger - Southern Tigers Brooke Basham - North Adelaide Rockets Alex Wilson - Norwood Flames Mollie McKendrick - Southern Tigers Mikayla Williams - Sturt Sabres	Tim Shortt - Sturt Sabres	Madison Freer - Forestville Eagles
2023	Men	Jawan Stepney - Woodville Warriors	Jordan Forbes - Sturt Sabres	Alex Starling - South Adelaide Panthers	Jordan Forbes - Sturt Sabres Branden Jenkins - Central District Lions Anthony Drmic - West Adelaide Bearcats Alex Starling - South Adelaide Panthers Lachlan Olbrich - West Adelaide Bearcats	Paul Rigoni - Sturt Sabres	Lachlan Olbrich - West Adelaide Bearcats
2022	Women	Mikayla Williams - Sturt Sabres	Sam Simons - Forestville Eagles	Alex Starling - South Adelaide Panthers	Jasmin Fejo - West Adelaide Bearcats Brooke Basham - Norwood Flames Alex Wilson - Norwood Flames Sam Simons - Forestville Eagles Mikayla Williams - Sturt Sabres	Tim Shortt - Sturt Sabres	Sam Simons - Forestville Eagles
2022	Men	Jeremy Smith - South Adelaide Panthers	Jeremy Smith - South Adelaide Panthers	Jasmine Simmons - West Adelaide Bearcats	Adam Doyle - Forestville Eagles Jeremy Smith - South Adelaide Panthers David Humphries - Central District Lions Jack Purchase - Forestville Eagles Lachlan Olbrich - Southern Tigers	Scott Whitmore - Woodville Warriors	Lachlan Olbrich - Southern Tigers
2021	Women	Teige Morrell - Southern Tigers	Teige Morrell - Southern Tigers	Jess Good - North Adelaide Rockets	Teige Morrell - Southern Tigers Morgan Yaegar - Southern Tigers Alex Wilson - Norwood Flames Sam Simons - Forestville Eagles Olivia Thompson - South Adelaide Panthers	Matthew Clarke - Southern Tigers	Sam Simons - Forestville Eagles
2021	Men	CJ Turnage - Norwood Flames	CJ Turnage - Norwood Flames	Cameron Coleman - Southern Tigers	CJ Turnage - Norwood Flames Sam Daly - Sturt Sabres Michael Harris - Forestville Eagles Cameron Coleman - Southern Tigers Greg Mays - Forestville Eagles	Paul Rigoni - Sturt Sabres	Michael Harris - Forestville Eagles

== List of champions ==
Team	Total Titles	Men's		Women's		Notes
Team	Total Titles	Titles	Winning seasons	Titles	Winning seasons	Notes
North Adelaide Rockets	27	6	1957, 1958, 1959, 1983, 2007, 2021	21	1957, 1961, 1964, 1965, 1967, 1969, 1970, 1971, 1975, 1976, 1977, 1982, 1988, 1989, 1990, 1991, 1994, 1998, 2004, 2014, 2018	Won both inaugural titles in 1957.
West Adelaide Bearcats	25	17	1967, 1968, 1970, 1971, 1972, 1975, 1978, 1979, 1980, 1981, 1982, 1988, 1994, 1996, 2017, 2023, 2025	8	1968, 1980, 1983, 1987, 1992, 1993, 2007, 2022	
West Torrens / Forestville Eagles	19	10	1974, 1990, 2003, 2006, 2011, 2012, 2013, 2019, 2024, 2026	9	1972, 1973, 2001, 2003, 2005, 2009, 2010, 2011, 2019	
Norwood Flames	13	4	1999, 2008, 2009, 2015	9	1995, 1997, 1999, 2000, 2012, 2013, 2015, 2016, 2023	
South Adelaide Panthers	12	11	1963, 1965, 1966, 1969, 1973, 1987, 1989, 1991, 1995, 1997, 2022	1	1958	
Glenelg / Noarlunga City Tigers	11	5	1976, 1977, 1992, 1993, 1998	6	1978, 1979, 1984, 1985, 1986, 1996	
Sturt Sabres	11	5	1985, 1986, 2001, 2002, 2010	6	1974, 1981, 2002, 2006, 2008, 2026	
Vikings	4	0		4	1959, 1960, 1962, 1963	
Woodville Warriors	4	3	2000, 2005, 2014	1	2025	
Southern Tigers	4	2	2016, 2018	2	2017, 2021	
A.S.K. (Adelaide Giants)	2	2	1960, 1964	0		
Budapest	2	2	1961, 1962	0		
Central Districts Lions	2	1	1984	1	2024	
Adelaide	1	0		1	1966	
Eastern Mavericks	1	1	2004	0		
