= 2023–24 Illawarra Hawks season =

Australian basketball club season

- Head coach: (United States) Justin Tatum
- Co-captains: (Australia) Sam Froling (United States) Tyler Harvey
- Arena: Wollongong Entertainment Centre

NBL results
- Record: 14–14 (50%)
- Ladder: 4th
- Finals finish: Semifinalist (lost to United 1–2)
- Stats at NBL.com.au

Player records
- Points: (United States) Clark 16.7
- Rebounds: (Australia) Froling 7.9
- Assists: (United States) Robinson 4.4
- All statistics correct as of 13 March 2024.

The 2023–24 Illawarra Hawks season was the 46th season of the franchise in the National Basketball League (NBL).

On 13 May 2023, the Hawks have picked up Jacob Jackomas’s second year team option. On 14 November 2023, Jacob Jackomas was released as Hawks' head coach after the team started the season with a 2–7 record and was replaced by Justin Tatum on an interim basis. On 22 February 2024, prior to the Hawks' playoff campaign, Tatum signed a three-year deal with Illawarra to continue as permanent head coach.

== Roster ==
Note: Flags indicate national team eligibility at FIBA-sanctioned events. Players may hold other non-FIBA nationalities not displayed.

2023–24 Illawarra Hawks roster
Players
Coaches

Pos.	No.	Nat.	Name	Ht.	Wt.
G	1	(United States)	Harvey, Tyler (C & I)	1.93 m (6 ft 4 in)	84 kg (185 lb)
G/F	2	(South Korea)	Lee Hyun-jung (SRP)	2.01 m (6 ft 7 in)	95 kg (209 lb)
G	3	(United States)	Robinson, Justin (I)	1.85 m (6 ft 1 in)	88 kg (194 lb)
G	6	(Australia)	Hickey, William	1.94 m (6 ft 4 in)	92 kg (203 lb)
G	7	(United States)	Johnson, AJ (NS)	1.98 m (6 ft 6 in)	73 kg (161 lb)
F	8	(United States)	Clark, Gary (I)	1.98 m (6 ft 6 in)	102 kg (225 lb)
G/F	9	(Australia)	Swaka Lo Buluk, Wani	1.98 m (6 ft 6 in)	88 kg (194 lb)
G	10	(Australia)	Adnam, Kyle (NRP)	1.86 m (6 ft 1 in)	84 kg (185 lb)
G/F	11	(Australia)	Grida, Daniel (injured)	1.97 m (6 ft 6 in)	93 kg (205 lb)
F/C	13	(Australia)	Froling, Sam (C)	2.13 m (7 ft 0 in)	109 kg (240 lb)
G	14	(Australia)	Bayles, Biwali (DP)	1.85 m (6 ft 1 in)	84 kg (185 lb)
F/C	19	(Australia)	Yates, Luca (DP)	2.08 m (6 ft 10 in)	102 kg (225 lb)
G/F	21	(Australia)	Blanchfield, Todd	1.98 m (6 ft 6 in)	98 kg (216 lb)
F	22	(Australia)	Peatling, Mason	2.03 m (6 ft 8 in)	105 kg (231 lb)
F	28	(Australia)	Morris, Harry (DP)	1.98 m (6 ft 6 in)	97 kg (214 lb)
F	30	(Australia)	Olbrich, Lachlan	2.08 m (6 ft 10 in)	107 kg (236 lb)

Head coach

- (United States) Justin Tatum

Assistant coach(es)

- (Australia) Joel Khalu
- (Australia) Lachlan Lonergan
- (Australia) Shaun Roger

Strength & conditioning coach(es)

- (Australia) Alex Moore

Legend

- (C) Team captain
- (DP) Development player
- (IN) Inactive
- (I) Import player
- (SRP) Special restricted player
- (NS) Next Star player
- Injured

- Roster
Updated: 22 January 2024

=== Depth chart ===
Pos.	Starting 5	Bench 1	Bench 2	Development
PG	Justin Robinson	William Hickey	AJ Johnson	Biwali Bayles
SG	Tyler Harvey	Lee Hyun-jung	Kyle Adnam
SF	Wani Swaka Lo Buluk	Todd Blanchfield	Daniel Grida	Harry Morris
PF	Gary Clark	Mason Peatling
C	Sam Froling	Lachlan Olbrich	Luca Yates

== Standings ==
=== Ladder ===
Pos	2023–24 NBL season											
Pos	Team	Pld	W	L	PCT	Last 5	Streak	Home	Away	PF	PA	PP
1	Melbourne United	28	20	8	71.43%	3–2	W1	11–3	9–5	2615	2454	106.56%
2	Perth Wildcats	28	17	11	60.71%	2–3	L2	10–4	7–7	2630	2563	102.61%
3	Tasmania JackJumpers	28	16	12	57.14%	4–1	W4	8–6	8–6	2564	2378	107.82%
4	Illawarra Hawks	28	14	14	50.00%	3–2	L1	8–6	6–8	2547	2518	101.15%
5	Sydney Kings	28	13	15	46.43%	2–3	W1	7–7	6–8	2672	2602	102.69%
6	New Zealand Breakers	28	13	15	46.43%	3–2	L1	8–6	5–9	2498	2480	100.73%
7	Brisbane Bullets	28	13	15	46.43%	2–3	L1	8–6	5–9	2458	2534	97.00%
8	Cairns Taipans	28	12	16	42.86%	1–4	W1	7–7	5–9	2506	2589	96.79%
9	Adelaide 36ers	28	12	16	42.86%	3–2	W1	9–5	3–11	2457	2563	95.86%
10	S.E. Melbourne Phoenix	28	10	18	35.71%	1–4	L4	7–7	3–11	2425	2691	90.12%

Updated to match(es) played on 18 February 2024. Source: NBL.com.au

The NBL tie-breaker system as outlined in the NBL Rules and Regulations states that in the case of an identical win–loss record, the overall points percentage will determine order of seeding.

=== Ladder progression ===
Leader and qualification to semifinals
Qualification to semifinals
Qualification to play-in games
Last place

2023–24 NBL season
Team ╲ Round	1	2	3	4	5	6	7	8	9	10	11	12	13	14	15	16	17	18	19	20
Adelaide 36ers	9	10	10	9	7	8	8	8	9	10	10	10	10	10	10	9	9	9	9	9
Brisbane Bullets	1	2	6	7	6	5	7	6	6	6	7	9	9	6	5	4	5	6	5	7
Cairns Taipans	8	6	3	4	3	7	6	7	7	7	6	6	7	9	7	6	7	8	8	8
Illawarra Hawks	10	8	9	10	9	10	10	10	10	8	8	8	8	5	6	8	6	4	4	4
Melbourne United	3	1	1	1	1	1	1	1	1	1	1	1	1	1	1	1	1	1	1	1
New Zealand Breakers	4	7	5	6	10	9	9	9	8	9	9	7	6	8	9	7	8	7	6	6
Perth Wildcats	6	5	8	8	8	6	5	4	3	5	3	2	2	2	2	2	2	2	2	2
S.E. Melbourne Phoenix	5	9	7	5	2	3	4	5	5	3	5	5	5	7	8	10	10	10	10	10
Sydney Kings	2	3	2	3	4	2	2	2	4	4	2	4	3	4	4	5	4	5	7	5
Tasmania JackJumpers	7	4	4	2	5	4	3	3	2	2	4	3	4	3	3	3	3	3	3	3

Updated to match(es) played on 18 February 2024. Source: NBL.com.au

== Game log ==
=== Pre-season ===
2023 pre-season game log
Total: 1–0 (Home: 1-0; Road: 0-0)
August : 1–0 (Home: 1–0; Road: 0–0)

Game	Date	Team	Score	High points	High rebounds	High assists	Location Attendance	Record
1	3 September	New Zealand	W 85-74	Tyler Harvey (19)	Clark, Olbrich (6)	Hickey (6)	Beaton Park Stadium n/a	1–0

2023 NBL Blitz game log
Total: 2–1 (Home: 1–0; Road: 1–1)
September: 2–1 (Home: 1–0; Road: 1–1)

Game	Date	Team	Score	High points	High rebounds	High assists	Location Attendance	Record
1	18 September	@ Melbourne	L 85–71	Mason Peatling (13)	Sam Froling (10)	Tyler Harvey (4)	Gold Coast Convention and Exhibition Centre n/a	0–1
2	20 September	@ Brisbane	W 88–95	Lachlan Olbrich (20)	Sam Froling (6)	four players (3)	Gold Coast Convention and Exhibition Centre n/a	1–1
3	22 September	Cairns	W 108–90	Lachlan Olbrich (18)	Wani Swaka Lo Buluk (7)	Lachlan Olbrich (5)	Gold Coast Convention and Exhibition Centre n/a	2–1

=== Regular season ===
2023–24 game log
Total: 14–14 (Home: 8–6; Road: 6–8)
September: 0–1 (Home: 0–1; Road: 0–0)

Game	Date	Team	Score	High points	High rebounds	High assists	Location Attendance	Record
1	30 September	Sydney	L 81–96	Tyler Harvey (19)	Sam Froling (11)	Justin Robinson (4)	Wollongong Entertainment Centre; 4,322	0–1

October: 2–4 (Home: 2–1; Road: 0–3)

Game	Date	Team	Score	High points	High rebounds	High assists	Location Attendance	Record
2	7 October	S.E. Melbourne	W 113–106	Justin Robinson (26)	Froling, Swaka Lo Buluk (8)	Justin Robinson (7)	Wollongong Entertainment Centre; 3,590	1–1
3	12 October	@ Tasmania	L 103–73	Gary Clark (16)	Sam Froling (10)	Justin Robinson (6)	Derwent Entertainment Centre; 4,340	1–2
4	14 October	@ Adelaide	L 89–80	Sam Froling (21)	Gary Clark (11)	Justin Robinson (4)	Adelaide Entertainment Centre; 9,108	1–3
5	20 October	Melbourne	L 91–101	Tyler Harvey (19)	Gary Clark (9)	Justin Robinson (5)	Wollongong Entertainment Centre; 2,927	1–4
6	26 October	Cairns	W 84–83	Tyler Harvey (20)	Sam Froling (13)	Tyler Harvey (5)	Wollongong Entertainment Centre; 1,923	2–4
7	29 October	@ Melbourne	L 96–84	Gary Clark (24)	three players (4)	Justin Robinson (9)	John Cain Arena; 9,067	2–5

November: 1–2 (Home: 0–1; Road: 1–1)

Game	Date	Team	Score	High points	High rebounds	High assists	Location Attendance	Record
8	3 November	Sydney	L 83–103	Gary Clark (23)	Sam Froling (11)	Justin Robinson (4)	Wollongong Entertainment Centre; 3,934	2–6
9	11 November	@ Cairns	L 81–71	Gary Clark (19)	Sam Froling (10)	Tyler Harvey (4)	Cairns Convention Centre; 4,614	2–7
10	19 November	@ New Zealand	W 65–69	Froling, Harvey (16)	Sam Froling (12)	Justin Robinson (4)	Spark Arena; 5,703	3–7

December: 4–2 (Home: 2–1; Road: 2–1)

Game	Date	Team	Score	High points	High rebounds	High assists	Location Attendance	Record
11	3 December	@ Brisbane	L 78–77	Clark, Robinson (13)	Gary Clark (9)	Olbrich, Robinson (4)	Nissan Arena; 3,572	3–8
12	8 December	Perth	W 100–82	Sam Froling (21)	Sam Froling (10)	Tyler Harvey (7)	Wollongong Entertainment Centre; 2,921	4–8
13	16 December	@ S.E. Melbourne	W 72–100	Tyler Harvey (25)	Gary Clark (13)	Justin Robinson (5)	Gippsland Regional Indoor Sports Stadium; 3,082	5–8
14	23 December	Tasmania	L 89–100	Sam Froling (22)	Sam Froling (11)	Harvey, Robinson (5)	Wollongong Entertainment Centre; 4,037	5–9
15	25 December	@ Sydney	W 90–94	Sam Froling (20)	Lachlan Olbrich (10)	Justin Robinson (5)	Sydney SuperDome; 8,578	6–9
16	31 December	Adelaide	W 91–84	Justin Robinson (19)	Gary Clark (12)	three players (3)	Wollongong Entertainment Centre; 5,101	7–9

January: 4–3 (Home: 2–2; Road: 2–1)

Game	Date	Team	Score	High points	High rebounds	High assists	Location Attendance	Record
17	5 January	S.E. Melbourne	W 116–78	Sam Froling (20)	Gary Clark (13)	Gary Clark (4)	Wollongong Entertainment Centre; 4,079	8–9
18	12 January	@ Tasmania	W 107–108 (2OT)	Gary Clark (25)	Gary Clark (15)	Justin Robinson (5)	Derwent Entertainment Centre; 4,340	9–9
19	14 January	@ Brisbane	L 110–103	Tyler Harvey (29)	Gary Clark (8)	Clark, Robinson (3)	Nissan Arena; 5,500	9–10
20	18 January	Cairns	L 92–93	Gary Clark (36)	Sam Froling (11)	Tyler Harvey (6)	Wollongong Entertainment Centre; 3,711	9–11
21	20 January	Adelaide	L 89–96	Hyunjung Lee (24)	Sam Froling (10)	Tyler Harvey (4)	Wollongong Entertainment Centre; 3,555	9–12
22	25 January	@ Perth	W 77–95	Gary Clark (17)	Lachlan Olbrich (7)	Harvey, Robinson (4)	Perth Arena; 12,771	10–12
23	28 January	New Zealand	W 89–85	Gary Clark (29)	Gary Clark (8)	Froling, Robinson (4)	Wollongong Entertainment Centre; 4,239	11–12

February: 3–2 (Home: 2–0; Road: 1–2)

Game	Date	Team	Score	High points	High rebounds	High assists	Location Attendance	Record
24	3 February	Brisbane	W 89–76	Gary Clark (19)	Gary Clark (10)	Justin Robinson (5)	Wollongong Entertainment Centre; 4,991	12–12
25	9 February	@ New Zealand	L 88–85	Tyler Harvey (22)	Sam Froling (10)	Justin Robinson (4)	Spark Arena; 3,941	12–13
26	11 February	@ Sydney	W 95–106	Gary Clark (22)	Sam Froling (11)	Harvey, Robinson (5)	Sydney SuperDome; 14,832	13–13
27	15 February	Perth	W 108–92	Gary Clark (26)	Gary Clark (11)	Justin Robinson (5)	Wollongong Entertainment Centre; 4,486	14–13
28	18 February	@ Melbourne	L 92–87	Justin Robinson (14)	Sam Froling (9)	Froling, Robinson (5)	John Cain Arena; 10,175	14–14

2023–24 season schedule

=== Postseason ===
2024 finals game log
Total: 2–3 (Home: 2–0; Road: 0–3)
Seeding qualifier: 0–1 (Home: 0–0; Road: 0–1)

Game	Date	Team	Score	High points	High rebounds	High assists	Location Attendance	Series
1	28 February	@ Tasmania	L 92–76	Gary Clark (21)	Gary Clark (10)	Justin Robinson (3)	Derwent Entertainment Centre; 4,340	0–1

Play-in game: 1–0 (Home: 1–0; Road: 0–0)

Game	Date	Team	Score	High points	High rebounds	High assists	Location Attendance	Series
1	4 March	New Zealand	W 88–85	Justin Robinson (26)	Sam Froling (9)	Justin Robinson (3)	Wollongong Entertainment Centre; 5,178	1–0

Semifinals: 1–2 (Home: 1–0; Road: 0–2)

Game	Date	Team	Score	High points	High rebounds	High assists	Location Attendance	Series
1	7 March	@ Melbourne	L 115–106 (OT)	Sam Froling (26)	Gary Clark (12)	Justin Robinson (7)	John Cain Arena; 8,232	0–1
2	10 March	Melbourne	W 113–108 (OT)	Gary Clark (31)	Gary Clark (16)	Sam Froling (4)	Wollongong Entertainment Centre; 5,631	1–1
3	13 March	@ Melbourne	L 100–94	Sam Froling (23)	Clark, Hickey (6)	Justin Robinson (7)	John Cain Arena; 6,288	1–2

2024 finals schedule

== Transactions ==
=== Re-signed ===
Player	Date Signed	Contract	Ref.
Justin Robinson	31 January 2023	1-year deal	
William Hickey	21 February 2023	1-year deal	
Daniel Grida	18 March 2023	2-year deal	
Harry Morris	29 March 2023	1-year deal	

=== Additions ===
Player	Date Signed	Contract	Former team	Ref.
Lachlan Olbrich	4 April 2023	3-year deal	UC Riverside Highlanders	
Mason Peatling	5 April 2023	2-year deal	Melbourne United	
AJ Johnson	14 April 2023	1-year deal (Next Star)	Texas Longhorns	
Biwali Bayles	14 April 2023	2-year deal	Sydney Kings	
Gary Clark	24 June 2024	1-year deal	Capitanes de la Ciudad de México	
Todd Blanchfield	28 June 2023	2-year deal	Perth Wildcats	
Luca Yates	8 July 2023	3-year deal (club option)	Townsville Heat	
Lee Hyun-jung	11 July 2023	3-year deal (club option)	Santa Cruz Warriors	
Kyle Adnam	16 January 2024	1-year deal (NRP)	CSU Sibiu	

=== Subtractions ===
Player	Reason left	Date Left	New team	Ref.
Kevin White	Retired	2 February 2023	n/a	
Tim Coenraad	Retired	3 February 2023	n/a	
Akoldah Gak	Free agent	10 April 2023	Cairns Taipans	
Mangok Mathiang	Free agent	13 June 2023	New Zealand Breakers	
Alex Mudronja	Free agent	8 August 2023	Cairns Taipans	

== Awards ==
=== Club awards ===
- Club MVP: Gary Clark
- Members Choice Award: Gary Clark
- Player's Player Award: Daniel Grida
- Defensive Player: Wani Swaka Lo Buluk
- Community Award: Daniel Grida
- Club Person of the Year: Scott Muttdon
- Volunteer of the Year: Stephen Craig
- 20 Years in the NBL: Joe Tertzakian

=== NBL Awards ===
- All-NBL First Team: Gary Clark
- NBL Next Generation Award: Sam Froling

== See also ==
- 2023–24 NBL season
- Illawarra Hawks
