= 2023–24 Tasmania JackJumpers season =

- NBL champions
- Head coach: (United States) Scott Roth
- Captain: (Australia) Clint Steindl
- Arena: Derwent Entertainment Centre

NBL results
- Record: 16–12 (57.1%)
- Ladder: 3rd
- Finals finish: Champions (1st title) (Defeated United 3–2)
- Stats at NBL.com.au

Player records
- Points: (United States) Crawford 16.9
- Rebounds: (Australia) Magnay 7.3
- Assists: (United States) Doyle 4.8
- All statistics correct as of 31 March 2024.

The 2023–24 Tasmania JackJumpers season was the 3rd season for the franchise in the National Basketball League (NBL).

== Roster ==
Note: Flags indicate national team eligibility at FIBA-sanctioned events. Players may hold other non-FIBA nationalities not displayed.

2023–24 Tasmania JackJumpers roster
Players
Coaches

Pos.	No.	Nat.	Name	Ht.	Wt.
G	1	(United States)	Crawford, Jordon (I)	1.68 m (5 ft 6 in)	70 kg (154 lb)
G/F	3	(Australia)	Drmic, Anthony	1.98 m (6 ft 6 in)	91 kg (201 lb)
F	5	(South Sudan)	Deng, Majok	2.05 m (6 ft 9 in)	84 kg (185 lb)
G	7	(New Zealand)	Brown, Walter (DP)	1.94 m (6 ft 4 in)	89 kg (196 lb)
G	9	(Australia)	McVeigh, Jack	2.03 m (6 ft 8 in)	93 kg (205 lb)
F	11	(Australia)	Richards, Jacob (DP)	2.00 m (6 ft 7 in)	99 kg (218 lb)
G	13	(Australia)	Macdonald, Sean (DP)	1.88 m (6 ft 2 in)	86 kg (190 lb)
F	15	(New Zealand)	Vodanovich, Tom	2.01 m (6 ft 7 in)	104 kg (229 lb)
F	20	(Australia)	Krslovic, Fabijan	2.03 m (6 ft 8 in)	106 kg (234 lb)
F	21	(Australia)	Bairstow, Jarred	2.01 m (6 ft 7 in)	101 kg (223 lb)
C	22	(Australia)	Magnay, Will	2.08 m (6 ft 10 in)	111 kg (245 lb)
F/C	24	(United States)	Lee, Marcus (injured) (I)	2.11 m (6 ft 11 in)	99 kg (218 lb)
G	25	(United States)	Doyle, Milton (I)	1.93 m (6 ft 4 in)	86 kg (190 lb)
F/C	33	(South Sudan)	Majok, Majok	2.10 m (6 ft 11 in)	112 kg (247 lb)
G/F	35	(Australia)	Steindl, Clint (C)	2.00 m (6 ft 7 in)	89 kg (196 lb)
G	38	(Australia)	Barker, Lachlan (NRP)	1.88 m (6 ft 2 in)	86 kg (190 lb)

Head coach

- (United States) Scott Roth

Assistant coach(es)

- (Australia) Mark Radford
- (Australia) Jack Fleming
- (Australia) Jarrad Weeks

Team manager

- (Australia) Mark Chivers

Legend

- (C) Team captain
- (DP) Development player
- (IN) Inactive
- (I) Import player
- (TP) Training player
- (SRP) Special restricted player
- (NS) Next Star player
- Injured

- Roster
Updated: 24 March 2024

=== Depth chart ===
Pos.	Starting 5	Bench 1	Bench 2	Development
PG	Jordon Crawford	Sean Macdonald	Lachlan Barker
SG	Milton Doyle	Junior Madut	Walter Brown
SF	Anthony Drmic	Clint Steindl	Jarred Bairstow	Jacob Richards
PF	Jack McVeigh	Fabijan Krslovic	Majok Deng
C	Marcus Lee	Will Magnay	Majok Majok

== Standings ==
=== Ladder ===
Pos	2023–24 NBL season											
Pos	Team	Pld	W	L	PCT	Last 5	Streak	Home	Away	PF	PA	PP
1	Melbourne United	28	20	8	71.43%	3–2	W1	11–3	9–5	2615	2454	106.56%
2	Perth Wildcats	28	17	11	60.71%	2–3	L2	10–4	7–7	2630	2563	102.61%
3	Tasmania JackJumpers	28	16	12	57.14%	4–1	W4	8–6	8–6	2564	2378	107.82%
4	Illawarra Hawks	28	14	14	50.00%	3–2	L1	8–6	6–8	2547	2518	101.15%
5	Sydney Kings	28	13	15	46.43%	2–3	W1	7–7	6–8	2672	2602	102.69%
6	New Zealand Breakers	28	13	15	46.43%	3–2	L1	8–6	5–9	2498	2480	100.73%
7	Brisbane Bullets	28	13	15	46.43%	2–3	L1	8–6	5–9	2458	2534	97.00%
8	Cairns Taipans	28	12	16	42.86%	1–4	W1	7–7	5–9	2506	2589	96.79%
9	Adelaide 36ers	28	12	16	42.86%	3–2	W1	9–5	3–11	2457	2563	95.86%
10	S.E. Melbourne Phoenix	28	10	18	35.71%	1–4	L4	7–7	3–11	2425	2691	90.12%

Updated to match(es) played on 18 February 2024. Source: NBL.com.au

The NBL tie-breaker system as outlined in the NBL Rules and Regulations states that in the case of an identical win–loss record, the overall points percentage will determine order of seeding.

=== Ladder progression ===
Leader and qualification to semifinals
Qualification to semifinals
Qualification to play-in games
Last place

2023–24 NBL season
Team ╲ Round	1	2	3	4	5	6	7	8	9	10	11	12	13	14	15	16	17	18	19	20
Adelaide 36ers	9	10	10	9	7	8	8	8	9	10	10	10	10	10	10	9	9	9	9	9
Brisbane Bullets	1	2	6	7	6	5	7	6	6	6	7	9	9	6	5	4	5	6	5	7
Cairns Taipans	8	6	3	4	3	7	6	7	7	7	6	6	7	9	7	6	7	8	8	8
Illawarra Hawks	10	8	9	10	9	10	10	10	10	8	8	8	8	5	6	8	6	4	4	4
Melbourne United	3	1	1	1	1	1	1	1	1	1	1	1	1	1	1	1	1	1	1	1
New Zealand Breakers	4	7	5	6	10	9	9	9	8	9	9	7	6	8	9	7	8	7	6	6
Perth Wildcats	6	5	8	8	8	6	5	4	3	5	3	2	2	2	2	2	2	2	2	2
S.E. Melbourne Phoenix	5	9	7	5	2	3	4	5	5	3	5	5	5	7	8	10	10	10	10	10
Sydney Kings	2	3	2	3	4	2	2	2	4	4	2	4	3	4	4	5	4	5	7	5
Tasmania JackJumpers	7	4	4	2	5	4	3	3	2	2	4	3	4	3	3	3	3	3	3	3

Updated to match(es) played on 18 February 2024. Source: NBL.com.au

== Game log ==
=== Pre-season ===
2023 NBL Blitz game log
Total: 3–0 (Home: 1–0; Road: 2–0)
September: 3–0 (Home: 1–0; Road: 2–0)

Game	Date	Team	Score	High points	High rebounds	High assists	Location Attendance	Record
1	16 September	@ S.E. Melbourne	W 84–97	Fabijan Krslovic (16)	Crawford, Krslovic (6)	Jordon Crawford (8)	Gold Coast Convention Centre n/a	1–0
2	19 September	@ New Zealand	W 85–92	Jack McVeigh (19)	Crawford, McVeigh (5)	Milton Doyle (7)	Gold Coast Convention Centre n/a	2–0
3	21 September	Adelaide	W 86–82	Milton Doyle (19)	Anthony Drmic (7)	Milton Doyle (7)	Gold Coast Convention Centre n/a	3–0

=== Regular season ===
2023–24 game log
Total: 16–12 (Home: 8–6; Road: 8–6)
September: 0–1 (Home: 0–0; Road: 0–1)

Game	Date	Team	Score	High points	High rebounds	High assists	Location Attendance	Record
1	29 September	@ Perth	L 101–95	Jack McVeigh (22)	Marcus Lee (9)	Milton Doyle (8)	Perth Arena; 12,361	0–1

October: 4–3 (Home: 2–1; Road: 2–2)

Game	Date	Team	Score	High points	High rebounds	High assists	Location Attendance	Record
2	6 October	Sydney	W 80–72	Milton Doyle (21)	Jack McVeigh (7)	Jordon Crawford (4)	Derwent Entertainment Centre; 4,340	1–1
3	8 October	@ Melbourne	W 75–80	Milton Doyle (25)	Milton Doyle (8)	Jordon Crawford (6)	John Cain Arena; 10,175	2–1
4	12 October	Illawarra	W 103–73	Milton Doyle (19)	Milton Doyle (9)	Jordon Crawford (6)	Derwent Entertainment Centre; 4,340	3–1
5	14 October	@ S.E. Melbourne	L 86–85	Jordon Crawford (27)	Jack McVeigh (9)	Jordon Crawford (6)	John Cain Arena; 6,017	3–2
6	22 October	@ Sydney	W 95–105	Jordon Crawford (32)	Marcus Lee (13)	Jordon Crawford (4)	Sydney SuperDome; 10,721	4–2
7	27 October	Melbourne	L 82–90	Jack McVeigh (20)	Marcus Lee (9)	Milton Doyle (5)	Derwent Entertainment Centre; 4,340	4–3
8	29 October	@ Brisbane	L 90–87	Jack McVeigh (18)	Krslovic, Lee (7)	Milton Doyle (8)	Nissan Arena; 4,559	4–4

November: 3–1 (Home: 1–1; Road: 2–0)

Game	Date	Team	Score	High points	High rebounds	High assists	Location Attendance	Record
9	4 November	Brisbane	W 87–85	Milton Doyle (24)	Marcus Lee (7)	Jordon Crawford (8)	Silverdome; 3,255	5–4
10	11 November	@ Adelaide	W 72–82	Jordon Crawford (17)	Marcus Lee (8)	Milton Doyle (8)	Adelaide Entertainment Centre; 9,440	6–4
11	16 November	New Zealand	L 92–97	Will Magnay (20)	Will Magnay (13)	Milton Doyle (6)	Silverdome; 3,255	6–5
12	18 November	@ Cairns	W 87–90 (OT)	Jack McVeigh (24)	Anthony Drmic (9)	three players (4)	Cairns Convention Centre; 4,194	7–5

December: 3–3 (Home: 1–2; Road: 2–1)

Game	Date	Team	Score	High points	High rebounds	High assists	Location Attendance	Record
13	2 December	Adelaide	W 94–59	Milton Doyle (20)	Marcus Lee (10)	Milton Doyle (6)	Derwent Entertainment Centre; 4,340	8–5
14	9 December	@ New Zealand	W 80–97	Jordon Crawford (30)	Will Magnay (12)	Fabijan Krslovic (4)	Spark Arena; 4,908	9–5
15	15 December	@ Perth	L 89–88	Jordon Crawford (29)	Will Magnay (10)	Milton Doyle (4)	Perth Arena; 12,600	9–6
16	17 December	Sydney	L 84–90	Jack McVeigh (23)	Jack McVeigh (7)	Doyle, Macdonald (3)	Derwent Entertainment Centre; 4,340	9–7
17	23 December	@ Illawarra	W 89–100	Jordon Crawford (20)	Will Magnay (7)	Milton Doyle (7)	Wollongong Entertainment Centre; 4,037	10–7
18	25 December	S.E. Melbourne	L 77–85	Jack McVeigh (20)	Will Magnay (11)	Jordon Crawford (4)	Derwent Entertainment Centre; 4,340	10–8

January: 2–4 (Home: 2–2; Road: 0–2)

Game	Date	Team	Score	High points	High rebounds	High assists	Location Attendance	Record
19	1 January	New Zealand	L 93–98	Sean Macdonald (23)	Marcus Lee (13)	Jack McVeigh (5)	Derwent Entertainment Centre; 4,340	10–9
20	6 January	Cairns	W 103–86	Milton Doyle (31)	Anthony Drmic (8)	Jordon Crawford (7)	Derwent Entertainment Centre; 4,340	11–9
21	10 January	@ Brisbane	L 80–77	Milton Doyle (19)	Marcus Lee (7)	Milton Doyle (3)	Nissan Arena; 4,486	11–10
22	12 January	Illawarra	L 107–108 (2OT)	Jordon Crawford (24)	Sean Macdonald (9)	Milton Doyle (6)	Derwent Entertainment Centre; 4,340	11–11
23	19 January	Melbourne	W 107–86	Jordon Crawford (25)	Marcus Lee (10)	Milton Doyle (6)	Derwent Entertainment Centre; 4,340	12–11
24	26 January	@ New Zealand	L 94–88	Jack McVeigh (22)	Will Magnay (8)	Sean Macdonald (6)	North Shore Events Centre; 2,272	12–12

February: 4–0 (Home: 2–0; Road: 2–0)

Game	Date	Team	Score	High points	High rebounds	High assists	Location Attendance	Record
25	1 February	@ Cairns	W 86–94	Jordon Crawford (25)	Milton Doyle (10)	Milton Doyle (7)	Cairns Convention Centre; 3,645	13–12
26	4 February	Adelaide	W 109–86	Jack McVeigh (26)	Will Magnay (12)	Milton Doyle (10)	Derwent Entertainment Centre; 4,340	14–12
27	10 February	@ S.E. Melbourne	W 67–94	four players (11)	Marcus Lee (7)	Milton Doyle (5)	John Cain Arena; 10,175	15–12
28	17 February	Perth	W 86–72	Milton Doyle (24)	Jack McVeigh (10)	Milton Doyle (5)	Derwent Entertainment Centre; 4,340	16–12

2023–24 season schedule

=== Postseason ===
2024 finals game log
Total: 6–3 (Home: 3–1; Road: 3–2)
Seeding qualifier: 1–0 (Home: 1–0; Road: 0–0)

Game	Date	Team	Score	High points	High rebounds	High assists	Location Attendance	Series
1	28 February	Illawarra	W 92–76	Jack McVeigh (26)	Jack McVeigh (11)	Milton Doyle (10)	Derwent Entertainment Centre; 4,340	1–0

Semifinals: 2–1 (Home: 1–0; Road: 1–1)

Game	Date	Team	Score	High points	High rebounds	High assists	Location Attendance	Series
1	8 March	@ Perth	L 89–81	Jordon Crawford (19)	Will Magnay (8)	Milton Doyle (6)	Perth Arena; 10,624	0–1
2	11 March	Perth	W 102–94	Milton Doyle (24)	Will Magnay (7)	Sean Macdonald (5)	Derwent Entertainment Centre; 4,340	1–1
3	13 March	@ Perth	W 84–100	Jack McVeigh (27)	Will Magnay (9)	Milton Doyle (9)	Perth Arena; 7,467	2–1

NBL Finals: 3–2 (Home: 1–1; Road: 2–1)

Game	Date	Team	Score	High points	High rebounds	High assists	Location Attendance	Series
1	17 March	@ Melbourne	L 104–81	Anthony Drmic (18)	Milton Doyle (8)	Macdonald, McVeigh (3)	John Cain Arena; 9,108	0–1
2	22 March	Melbourne	W 82–77	Jack McVeigh (16)	Milton Doyle (8)	Crawford, McVeigh (4)	Derwent Entertainment Centre; 4,340	1–1
3	24 March	@ Melbourne	W 91–93	Jack McVeigh (18)	Jack McVeigh (12)	Milton Doyle (7)	John Cain Arena; 10,175	2–1
4	28 March	Melbourne	L 86–88	Jack McVeigh (28)	Anthony Drmic (8)	Doyle, Drmic (3)	Derwent Entertainment Centre; 4,340	2–2
5	31 March	@ Melbourne	W 81–83	Jordon Crawford (32)	Will Magnay (12)	Doyle, Macdonald (2)	John Cain Centre; 10,175	3–2

2024 finals schedule

== Transactions ==
=== Re-signed ===
Player	Date Signed	Contract	Ref.
Jack McVeigh	24 October 2022	2-year deal	
Clint Steindl	15 November 2022	2-year deal	
Sean Macdonald	6 January 2023	2-year deal	
Fabijan Krslovic	14 March 2023	2-year deal	
Walter Brown	5 May 2023	3-year deal	
Josh Tomasi	30 May 2023	1-year deal	
Milton Doyle	8 June 2023	2-year deal	

=== Additions ===
Player	Date Signed	Contract	Former team	Ref.
Anthony Drmic	17 April 2023	1-year deal	Adelaide 36ers	
Junior Madut	2 May 2023	2-year deal (club option)	S.E. Melbourne Phoenix	
Tre Armstrong	16 May 2023	1-year deal	California Baptist Lancers	
Marcus Lee	22 June 2023	1-year deal	Melbourne United	
Jordon Crawford	23 June 2023	1-year deal	Piratas de Quebradillas	
Majok Deng	28 June 2023	1-year deal	Cairns Taipans	
Lachlan Barker	24 July 2023	1-year deal (NRP)	Melbourne United	
Jacob Richards	1 August 2023	2-year deal	Hobart Chargers	
Majok Majok	7 August 2023	1-year deal (NRP)	Perth Wildcats	
Tom Vodanovich	5 January 2024	1-year deal	New Zealand Breakers	

=== Subtractions ===
Player	Reason left	Date Left	New team	Ref.
Sam McDaniel	Declined player option	14 March 2023	Brisbane Bullets	
Isaac White	Free agent	31 March 2023	Brisbane Bullets	
Matt Kenyon	Free agent	17 April 2023	S.E. Melbourne Phoenix	
Jarrad Weeks	Retired	4 June 2023	n/a	
Josh Magette	Retired	20 June 2023	n/a	
Tre Armstrong	Released	6 July 2023	n/a	
Josh Tomasi	Released	28 July 2023	n/a	
Junior Madut	Released	5 January 2024	Manchester Basketball	

== Awards ==
=== Club awards ===
- Club MVP: Jack McVeigh
- Fan Favourite: Milton Doyle
- Defensive Player: Will Magnay
- Players Award: Will Magnay
- Coaches Award: Jarred Bairstow
- Spirit of the JackJumpers: Deb Hills, Chris Hills, Lesley Buchanan

== See also ==
- 2023–24 NBL season
- Tasmania JackJumpers
