= 2023–24 S.E. Melbourne Phoenix season =

Australian basketball team season

- Head coach: (United States) Mike Kelly
- Captain: (Australia) Mitch Creek
- Arena: John Cain Arena

NBL results
- Record: 10–18 (35.7%)
- Ladder: 10th
- Finals finish: Did not qualify
- Stats at NBL.com.au

Player records
- Points: (Australia) Creek 20.8
- Rebounds: (United States) Williams 10.9
- Assists: (Puerto Rico) Browne 4.5
- All statistics correct as of 18 February 2024.

The 2023–24 S.E. Melbourne Phoenix season was the 5th season of the franchise in the National Basketball League (NBL), and their first under the leadership of their new head coach Mike Kelly.

== Roster ==
Note: Flags indicate national team eligibility at FIBA-sanctioned events. Players may hold other non-FIBA nationalities not displayed.

2023–24 S.E. Melbourne Phoenix roster
Players
Coaches

Pos.	No.	Nat.	Name	Ht.	Wt.
C	1	(New Zealand)	Rissetto, Anzac (DP)	2.08 m (6 ft 10 in)
G	2	(Australia)	Kenyon, Matt	1.96 m (6 ft 5 in)	91 kg (201 lb)
G	6	(Australia)	Stattmann, Kody (DP)	2.02 m (6 ft 8 in)	91 kg (201 lb)
G/F	7	(New Zealand)	Te Rangi, Reuben	1.98 m (6 ft 6 in)	105 kg (231 lb)
G	10	(Australia)	Ayre, Ben	1.84 m (6 ft 0 in)	80 kg (176 lb)
F	11	(Egypt)	Nader, Abdel (injured) (I)	1.96 m (6 ft 5 in)	102 kg (225 lb)
C	12	(South Sudan)	Gak, Gorjok	2.11 m (6 ft 11 in)	102 kg (225 lb)
G	13	(Australia)	Rosendale, Luke (DP)	1.94 m (6 ft 4 in)
G	14	(Puerto Rico)	Browne, Gary (injured) (I)	1.85 m (6 ft 1 in)	86 kg (190 lb)
F/C	15	(United States)	Williams, Alan (injured)	2.03 m (6 ft 8 in)	116 kg (256 lb)
F	22	(Australia)	Rapp, Austin (DP)	2.06 m (6 ft 9 in)	106 kg (234 lb)
F	25	(Australia)	Vague, Rhys	2.06 m (6 ft 9 in)	102 kg (225 lb)
G	30	(Australia)	Foxwell, Owen (DP)	1.88 m (6 ft 2 in)	81 kg (179 lb)
F	33	(Australia)	Moller, Craig (injured)	2.08 m (6 ft 10 in)	93 kg (205 lb)
G/F	55	(Australia)	Creek, Mitch (C)	1.96 m (6 ft 5 in)	102 kg (225 lb)

Head coach

- (United States) Mike Kelly

Assistant coach(es)

- (Australia) Luke Brennan
- (Australia) Sam Mackinnon

Legend

- (C) Team captain
- (DP) Development player
- (IN) Inactive
- (I) Import player
- (SRP) Special restricted player
- (NS) Next Star player
- Injured

- Roster
Updated: 17 February 2024

=== Depth chart ===
Pos.	Starting 5	Bench 1	Bench 2
PG	Gary Browne	Ben Ayre	Owen Foxwell
SG	Matt Kenyon	Luke Rosendale	Kody Stattmann
SF	Abdel Nader	Reuben Te Rangi	Craig Moller
PF	Mitch Creek	Rhys Vague	Austin Rapp
C	Alan Williams	Gorjok Gak	Anzac Rissetto

== Standings ==
=== Ladder ===
Pos	2023–24 NBL season											
Pos	Team	Pld	W	L	PCT	Last 5	Streak	Home	Away	PF	PA	PP
1	Melbourne United	28	20	8	71.43%	3–2	W1	11–3	9–5	2615	2454	106.56%
2	Perth Wildcats	28	17	11	60.71%	2–3	L2	10–4	7–7	2630	2563	102.61%
3	Tasmania JackJumpers	28	16	12	57.14%	4–1	W4	8–6	8–6	2564	2378	107.82%
4	Illawarra Hawks	28	14	14	50.00%	3–2	L1	8–6	6–8	2547	2518	101.15%
5	Sydney Kings	28	13	15	46.43%	2–3	W1	7–7	6–8	2672	2602	102.69%
6	New Zealand Breakers	28	13	15	46.43%	3–2	L1	8–6	5–9	2498	2480	100.73%
7	Brisbane Bullets	28	13	15	46.43%	2–3	L1	8–6	5–9	2458	2534	97.00%
8	Cairns Taipans	28	12	16	42.86%	1–4	W1	7–7	5–9	2506	2589	96.79%
9	Adelaide 36ers	28	12	16	42.86%	3–2	W1	9–5	3–11	2457	2563	95.86%
10	S.E. Melbourne Phoenix	28	10	18	35.71%	1–4	L4	7–7	3–11	2425	2691	90.12%

Updated to match(es) played on 18 February 2024. Source: NBL.com.au

The NBL tie-breaker system as outlined in the NBL Rules and Regulations states that in the case of an identical win–loss record, the overall points percentage will determine order of seeding.

=== Ladder progression ===
Leader and qualification to semifinals
Qualification to semifinals
Qualification to play-in games
Last place

2023–24 NBL season
Team ╲ Round	1	2	3	4	5	6	7	8	9	10	11	12	13	14	15	16	17	18	19	20
Adelaide 36ers	9	10	10	9	7	8	8	8	9	10	10	10	10	10	10	9	9	9	9	9
Brisbane Bullets	1	2	6	7	6	5	7	6	6	6	7	9	9	6	5	4	5	6	5	7
Cairns Taipans	8	6	3	4	3	7	6	7	7	7	6	6	7	9	7	6	7	8	8	8
Illawarra Hawks	10	8	9	10	9	10	10	10	10	8	8	8	8	5	6	8	6	4	4	4
Melbourne United	3	1	1	1	1	1	1	1	1	1	1	1	1	1	1	1	1	1	1	1
New Zealand Breakers	4	7	5	6	10	9	9	9	8	9	9	7	6	8	9	7	8	7	6	6
Perth Wildcats	6	5	8	8	8	6	5	4	3	5	3	2	2	2	2	2	2	2	2	2
S.E. Melbourne Phoenix	5	9	7	5	2	3	4	5	5	3	5	5	5	7	8	10	10	10	10	10
Sydney Kings	2	3	2	3	4	2	2	2	4	4	2	4	3	4	4	5	4	5	7	5
Tasmania JackJumpers	7	4	4	2	5	4	3	3	2	2	4	3	4	3	3	3	3	3	3	3

Updated to match(es) played on 18 February 2024. Source: NBL.com.au

== Game log ==
=== Pre-season ===
2023 NBL Blitz game log
Total: 1–2 (Home: 0–1; Road: 1–1)
September: 1–2 (Home: 0–1; Road: 1–1)

Game	Date	Team	Score	High points	High rebounds	High assists	Location Attendance	Record
1	16 September	Tasmania	L 84–97	Tyler Cook (18)	Tyler Cook (11)	Gary Browne (7)	Gold Coast Convention Centre n/a	0–1
2	18 September	@ Sydney	W 86–93	Tyler Cook (29)	Tyler Cook (9)	Gary Browne (3)	Gold Coast Convention Centre n/a	1–1
3	20 September	@ Cairns	L 100–95	Gary Browne (19)	Tyler Cook (6)	Ben Ayre (5)	Gold Coast Convention Centre n/a	1–2

=== Regular season ===
2023–24 game log
Total: 10–18 (Home: 7–7; Road: 3–11)
September: 0–1 (Home: 0–0; Road: 0–1)

Game	Date	Team	Score	High points	High rebounds	High assists	Location Attendance	Record
1	28 September	@ Melbourne	L 82–67	Ben Ayre (17)	Mitch Creek (9)	Will Cummings (3)	John Cain Arena; 10,175	0–1

October: 5–2 (Home: 4–0; Road: 1–2)

Game	Date	Team	Score	High points	High rebounds	High assists	Location Attendance	Record
2	1 October	Perth	W 110–99	Creek, Cummings (23)	Tyler Cook (10)	Will Cummings (4)	John Cain Arena; 6,641	1–1
3	5 October	@ Cairns	L 87–80	Mitch Creek (20)	Mitch Creek (8)	Gary Browne (4)	Cairns Convention Centre; 3,906	1–2
4	7 October	@ Illawarra	L 113–106	Will Cummings (28)	Mitch Creek (8)	Creek, Cummings (3)	Wollongong Entertainment Centre; 3,590	1–3
5	14 October	Tasmania	W 86–85	Gary Browne (20)	Gary Browne (9)	Gary Browne (4)	John Cain Arena; 6,017	2–3
6	19 October	@ Adelaide	W 85–102	Mitch Creek (23)	Alan Williams (13)	Gary Browne (8)	Adelaide Entertainment Centre; 6,870	3–3
7	21 October	Brisbane	W 96–73	Alan Williams (21)	Creek, Moller (7)	Browne, Williams (3)	John Cain Arena; 5,552	4–3
8	28 October	New Zealand	W 103–100	Alan Williams (21)	Alan Williams (13)	Gary Browne (8)	John Cain Arena; 6,195	5–3

November: 1–3 (Home: 1–1; Road: 0–2)

Game	Date	Team	Score	High points	High rebounds	High assists	Location Attendance	Record
9	2 November	@ Brisbane	L 108–92	Gary Browne (25)	Gary Browne (8)	Gary Browne (5)	Nissan Arena; 2,834	5–4
10	5 November	Cairns	W 91–78	Mitch Creek (21)	Alan Williams (15)	Gary Browne (8)	John Cain Arena; 7,511	6–4
11	12 November	Melbourne	L 83–92	Mitch Creek (19)	Craig Moller (9)	Browne, Cummings (4)	John Cain Arena; 10,175	6–5
12	17 November	@ Adelaide	L 96–93	Alan Williams (23)	Alan Williams (11)	Ben Ayre (4)	Adelaide Entertainment Centre; 7,833	6–6

December: 3–4 (Home: 1–2; Road: 2–2)

Game	Date	Team	Score	High points	High rebounds	High assists	Location Attendance	Record
13	2 December	New Zealand	W 90–79	Mitch Creek (26)	Alan Williams (14)	Alan Williams (8)	John Cain Arena; 6,244	7–6
14	10 December	@ Sydney	W 94–104	Mitch Creek (33)	Alan Williams (15)	Gary Browne (9)	Sydney SuperDome; 13,197	8–6
15	14 December	Melbourne	L 78–106	Gary Browne (22)	Alan Williams (16)	Mitch Creek (6)	John Cain Arena; 7,672	8–7
16	16 December	Illawarra	L 72–100	Alan Williams (17)	Alan Williams (12)	Gary Browne (6)	Gippsland Regional Indoor Sports Stadium; 3,082	8–8
17	22 December	@ Cairns	L 94–75	Alan Williams (29)	Alan Williams (8)	Gary Browne (6)	Cairns Convention Centre; 3,651	8–9
18	25 December	@ Tasmania	W 77–85	Browne, Nader (20)	Gary Browne (11)	Gary Browne (6)	Derwent Entertainment Centre; 4,340	9–9
19	30 December	@ Brisbane	L 95–83	Matt Kenyon (14)	Creek, Williams (11)	Ben Ayre (5)	Nissan Arena; 4,208	9–10

January: 1–5 (Home: 1–2; Road: 0–3)

Game	Date	Team	Score	High points	High rebounds	High assists	Location Attendance	Record
20	5 January	@ Illawarra	L 116–78	Mitch Creek (24)	Mitch Creek (7)	Owen Foxwell (5)	Wollongong Entertainment Centre; 4,079	9–11
21	13 January	@ Perth	L 100–79	Mitch Creek (36)	Gorjok Gak (11)	Ben Ayre (4)	Perth Arena; 12,859	9–12
22	17 January	Adelaide	L 85–110	Abdel Nader (18)	Gorjok Gak (8)	Ayre, Foxwell (3)	State Basketball Centre; 3,422	9–13
23	20 January	@ New Zealand	L 106–75	Mitch Creek (27)	Mitch Creek (7)	Ayre, Te Rangi (4)	Spark Arena; 4,940	9–14
24	25 January	Sydney	W 104–98	Mitch Creek (31)	Mitch Creek (10)	Owen Foxwell (6)	State Basketball Centre; 3,422	10–14
25	27 January	Perth	L 91–103	Mitch Creek (29)	Gorjok Gak (8)	Ben Ayre (8)	State Basketball Centre; 3,422	10–15

February: 0–3 (Home: 0–2; Road: 0–1)

Game	Date	Team	Score	High points	High rebounds	High assists	Location Attendance	Record
26	3 February	@ Melbourne	L 99–83	Abdel Nader (18)	Gorjok Gak (11)	Ben Ayre (9)	John Cain Arena; 10,175	10–16
27	10 February	Tasmania	L 67–94	Abdel Nader (19)	Gorjok Gak (7)	Ayre, Nader (3)	John Cain Arena; 10,175	10–17
28	17 February	Sydney	L 67–122	Owen Foxwell (16)	Kody Stattmann (5)	three players (3)	John Cain Arena; 8,279	10–18

2023–24 season schedule

== Transactions ==
=== Re-signed ===
Player	Date Signed	Contract	Ref.
Alan Williams	7 February 2023	2-year deal	
Owen Foxwell	14 March 2023	2-year deal	
Anzac Rissetto	17 March 2023	2-year deal (club option)	
Gary Browne	26 July 2023	1-year deal	

=== Additions ===
Player	Date Signed	Contract	Former team	Ref.
Gorjok Gak	10 April 2023	1-year deal	Brisbane Bullets	
Matt Kenyon	17 April 2023	2-year deal	Tasmania JackJumpers	
Rhys Vague	24 April 2023	1-year deal	Kagawa Five Arrows	
Ben Ayre	2 May 2023	2-year deal	Cairns Taipans	
Austin Rapp	14 June 2023	1-year deal	Knox Raiders	
Kody Stattmann	28 July 2023	1-year deal	Brisbane Bullets	
Craig Moller	2 August 2023	1-year deal	Würzburg Baskets	
Will Cummings	11 August 2023	1-year deal	Zhejiang Lions	
Tyler Cook	11 September 2023	1-year deal (NRP)	Salt Lake City Stars	
Daniel Johnson	9 November 2023	1-year deal (NRP)	Adelaide 36ers	
Abdel Nader	12 December 2023	1-year deal	Phoenix Suns	

=== Subtractions ===
Player	Reason left	Date Left	New team	Ref.
Kyle Adnam	Free agent	28 February 2023	Wellington Saints	
Junior Madut	Free agent	2 May 2023	Tasmania JackJumpers	
Dane Pineau	Free agent	20 June 2023	New Zealand Breakers	
Ryan Broekhoff	Retired	12 July 2023	n/a	
Trey Kell	Free agent	31 July 2023	S.E. Melbourne Phoenix	
Tohi Smith-Milner	Free agent	26 August 2023	Adelaide 36ers	
Tyler Cook	Released (NRP)	17 October 2023	Joventut Badalona	
Daniel Johnson	Released (NRP)	8 December 2023	Taiwan Beer Leopards	
Will Cummings	Released	8 December 2023	TBC	

== Awards ==
=== Club awards ===
- Club MVP: Mitch Creek
- Community Player of the Year: Owen Foxwell

== See also ==
- 2023–24 NBL season
- South East Melbourne Phoenix
