= 2023–24 Perth Wildcats season =

- Head coach: (Australia) John Rillie
- Captain: (Australia) Jesse Wagstaff
- Arena: Perth Arena

NBL results
- Record: 17–11 (60.7%)
- Ladder: 2nd
- Finals finish: Semifinalist (lost to JackJumpers 1–2)
- Stats at NBL.com.au

Player records
- Points: (United States) Cotton 23.1
- Rebounds: (United States) Doolittle 6.8
- Assists: (United States) Cotton 4.3
- All statistics correct as of 13 March 2024.

The 2023–24 Perth Wildcats season was the 43rd season of the franchise in the National Basketball League (NBL).

On 16 May 2023, the Wildcats have picked up John Rillie’s third year team option.

== Roster ==
Note: Flags indicate national team eligibility at FIBA-sanctioned events. Players may hold other non-FIBA nationalities not displayed.

2023–24 Perth Wildcats roster
Players
Coaches

Pos.	No.	Nat.	Name	Ht.	Wt.
G	0	(New Zealand)	Webster, Tai	1.93 m (6 ft 4 in)	89 kg (196 lb)
G	1	(New Zealand)	Russo-Nance, Dontae (DP)	1.90 m (6 ft 3 in)	90 kg (198 lb)
F	5	(United States)	Doolittle, Kristian (I)	2.01 m (6 ft 7 in)	105 kg (231 lb)
F	8	(United States)	Usher, Jordan (I)	2.01 m (6 ft 7 in)	100 kg (220 lb)
G	9	(New Zealand)	Webster, Corey	1.88 m (6 ft 2 in)	89 kg (196 lb)
G	10	(Australia)	Henshall, Ben	1.95 m (6 ft 5 in)	90 kg (198 lb)
G	11	(United States)	Cotton, Bryce (injured) (I)	1.82 m (6 ft 0 in)	76 kg (168 lb)
C	12	(New Zealand)	Andrew, Jack (DP)	2.08 m (6 ft 10 in)	115 kg (254 lb)
F	13	(New Zealand)	Harris, Hyrum	2.04 m (6 ft 8 in)	110 kg (243 lb)
G	17	(Australia)	Harris, Michael (DP)	1.93 m (6 ft 4 in)	85 kg (187 lb)
C	20	(France)	Sarr, Alex (NS)	2.16 m (7 ft 1 in)	98 kg (216 lb)
G	22	(Australia)	Zunic, Kyle	1.88 m (6 ft 2 in)	90 kg (198 lb)
F	24	(Australia)	Wagstaff, Jesse (C)	2.03 m (6 ft 8 in)	103 kg (227 lb)
F	25	(Australia)	Pinder, Keanu	2.10 m (6 ft 11 in)	103 kg (227 lb)
F	35	(Australia)	Okwera, David	2.08 m (6 ft 10 in)	90 kg (198 lb)

Head coach

- (Australia) John Rillie

Assistant coach(es)

- (Australia) Keegan Crawford
- (Australia) Gerard Martin
- (Australia) Aaron Young

Strength & conditioning coach(es)

- (Australia) Josh Cavanagh

Legend

- (C) Team captain
- (DP) Development player
- (IN) Inactive
- (I) Import player
- (TP) Training player
- (SRP) Special restricted player
- (NS) Next Star player
- Injured

- Roster
Updated: 17 February 2024

=== Depth chart ===
Pos.	Starting 5	Bench 1	Bench 2
PG	Tai Webster	Kyle Zunic	Dontae Russo-Nance
SG	Bryce Cotton	Corey Webster	Ben Henshall
SF	Jordan Usher	Michael Harris	David Okwera
PF	Kristian Doolittle	Hyrum Harris	Jesse Wagstaff
C	Keanu Pinder	Alex Sarr	Jack Andrew

== Standings ==
=== Ladder ===
Pos	2023–24 NBL season											
Pos	Team	Pld	W	L	PCT	Last 5	Streak	Home	Away	PF	PA	PP
1	Melbourne United	28	20	8	71.43%	3–2	W1	11–3	9–5	2615	2454	106.56%
2	Perth Wildcats	28	17	11	60.71%	2–3	L2	10–4	7–7	2630	2563	102.61%
3	Tasmania JackJumpers	28	16	12	57.14%	4–1	W4	8–6	8–6	2564	2378	107.82%
4	Illawarra Hawks	28	14	14	50.00%	3–2	L1	8–6	6–8	2547	2518	101.15%
5	Sydney Kings	28	13	15	46.43%	2–3	W1	7–7	6–8	2672	2602	102.69%
6	New Zealand Breakers	28	13	15	46.43%	3–2	L1	8–6	5–9	2498	2480	100.73%
7	Brisbane Bullets	28	13	15	46.43%	2–3	L1	8–6	5–9	2458	2534	97.00%
8	Cairns Taipans	28	12	16	42.86%	1–4	W1	7–7	5–9	2506	2589	96.79%
9	Adelaide 36ers	28	12	16	42.86%	3–2	W1	9–5	3–11	2457	2563	95.86%
10	S.E. Melbourne Phoenix	28	10	18	35.71%	1–4	L4	7–7	3–11	2425	2691	90.12%

Updated to match(es) played on 18 February 2024. Source: NBL.com.au

The NBL tie-breaker system as outlined in the NBL Rules and Regulations states that in the case of an identical win–loss record, the overall points percentage will determine order of seeding.

=== Ladder progression ===
Leader and qualification to semifinals
Qualification to semifinals
Qualification to play-in games
Last place

2023–24 NBL season
Team ╲ Round	1	2	3	4	5	6	7	8	9	10	11	12	13	14	15	16	17	18	19	20
Adelaide 36ers	9	10	10	9	7	8	8	8	9	10	10	10	10	10	10	9	9	9	9	9
Brisbane Bullets	1	2	6	7	6	5	7	6	6	6	7	9	9	6	5	4	5	6	5	7
Cairns Taipans	8	6	3	4	3	7	6	7	7	7	6	6	7	9	7	6	7	8	8	8
Illawarra Hawks	10	8	9	10	9	10	10	10	10	8	8	8	8	5	6	8	6	4	4	4
Melbourne United	3	1	1	1	1	1	1	1	1	1	1	1	1	1	1	1	1	1	1	1
New Zealand Breakers	4	7	5	6	10	9	9	9	8	9	9	7	6	8	9	7	8	7	6	6
Perth Wildcats	6	5	8	8	8	6	5	4	3	5	3	2	2	2	2	2	2	2	2	2
S.E. Melbourne Phoenix	5	9	7	5	2	3	4	5	5	3	5	5	5	7	8	10	10	10	10	10
Sydney Kings	2	3	2	3	4	2	2	2	4	4	2	4	3	4	4	5	4	5	7	5
Tasmania JackJumpers	7	4	4	2	5	4	3	3	2	2	4	3	4	3	3	3	3	3	3	3

Updated to match(es) played on 18 February 2024. Source: NBL.com.au

== Game log ==
=== Pre-season ===
2023 NBL Blitz game log
Total: 3–0 (Home: 2–0; Road: 1–0)
September: 3–0 (Home: 2–0; Road: 1–0)

Game	Date	Team	Score	High points	High rebounds	High assists	Location Attendance	Record
1	17 September	@ Cairns	W 95–102	Bryce Cotton (31)	Pinder, Sarr (8)	three players (4)	Gold Coast Convention Centre n/a	1–0
2	19 September	Adelaide	W 112–80	Michael Harris (18)	Alexandre Sarr (8)	five players (3)	Gold Coast Convention n/a	2–0
3	21 September	New Zealand	W 93–89	Jordan Usher (26)	Keanu Pinder (13)	Ben Henshall (4)	Gold Coast Convention Centre n/a	3–0

=== Regular season ===
2023–24 game log
Total: 17–11 (Home: 10–4; Road: 7–7)
September: 1–0 (Home: 1–0; Road: 0–0)

Game	Date	Team	Score	High points	High rebounds	High assists	Location Attendance	Record
1	29 September	Tasmania	W 101–95	Jordan Usher (35)	Pinder, Sarr (5)	Bryce Cotton (6)	Perth Arena; 12,361	1–0

October: 1–5 (Home: 1–2; Road: 0–3)

Game	Date	Team	Score	High points	High rebounds	High assists	Location Attendance	Record
2	1 October	@ S.E. Melbourne	L 110–99	Ben Henshall (24)	three players (5)	Bryce Cotton (10)	John Cain Arena; 6,641	1–1
3	6 October	Adelaide	W 82–75	Bryce Cotton (19)	Keanu Pinder (7)	Bryce Cotton (5)	Perth Arena; 11,306	2–1
4	13 October	Melbourne	L 81–88	Keanu Pinder (25)	Alexandre Sarr (9)	Corey Webster (5)	Perth Arena; 10,982	2–2
5	15 October	@ Sydney	L 99–86	Bryce Cotton (22)	Keanu Pinder (7)	Tai Webster (5)	Sydney SuperDome; 10,546	2–3
6	21 October	@ Adelaide	L 89–78	Keanu Pinder (17)	Keanu Pinder (13)	Keanu Pinder (5)	Adelaide Entertainment Centre; 8,140	2–4
7	27 October	Brisbane	L 79–84	Keanu Pinder (22)	Kristian Doolittle (11)	Bryce Cotton (5)	Perth Arena; 10,481	2–5

November: 5–0 (Home: 3–0; Road: 2–0)

Game	Date	Team	Score	High points	High rebounds	High assists	Location Attendance	Record
8	4 November	Adelaide	W 99–88	Bryce Cotton (29)	Kristian Doolittle (8)	Bryce Cotton (5)	Perth Arena; 11,326	3–5
9	6 November	@ Melbourne	W 95–102 (OT)	Bryce Cotton (24)	Jesse Wagstaff (8)	Kristian Doolittle (5)	John Cain Arena; 10,175	4–5
10	10 November	New Zealand	W 94–76	Bryce Cotton (37)	Kristian Doolittle (11)	Doolittle, H.Harris (4)	Perth Arena; 10,685	5–5
11	16 November	Cairns	W 88–80	Bryce Cotton (25)	Kristian Doolittle (8)	Bryce Cotton (4)	Perth Arena; 9,976	6–5
12	18 November	@ Brisbane	W 76–79	Bryce Cotton (25)	Keanu Pinder (10)	three players (3)	Nissan Arena; 4,869	7–5

December: 4–2 (Home: 2–0; Road: 2–2)

Game	Date	Team	Score	High points	High rebounds	High assists	Location Attendance	Record
13	1 December	Sydney	W 114–105	Bryce Cotton (41)	Keanu Pinder (9)	Bryce Cotton (7)	Perth Arena; 11,897	8–5
14	8 December	@ Illawarra	L 100–82	Jordan Usher (17)	Keanu Pinder (10)	Bryce Cotton (7)	Wollongong Entertainment Centre; 2,921	8–6
15	15 December	Tasmania	W 89–88	Bryce Cotton (28)	Bryce Cotton (8)	Cotton, Pinder (4)	Perth Arena; 12,600	9–6
16	23 December	@ Melbourne	L 109–103 (OT)	Bryce Cotton (36)	Keanu Pinder (9)	Doolittle, Pinder (4)	John Cain Arena; 10,175	9–7
17	26 December	@ Cairns	W 102–105	Bryce Cotton (33)	Kristian Doolittle (16)	Pinder, T.Webster (4)	Cairns Convention Centre; 4,050	10–7
19	28 December	@ Adelaide	W 82–100	Bryce Cotton (24)	Doolittle, Pinder (5)	Bryce Cotton (6)	Adelaide Entertainment Centre; 9,468	11–7

January: 5–1 (Home: 2–1; Road: 3–0)

Game	Date	Team	Score	High points	High rebounds	High assists	Location Attendance	Record
19	7 January	@ New Zealand	W 102–108	Bryce Cotton (31)	Hyrum Harris (8)	Tai Webster (6)	Spark Arena; 6,280	12–7
20	13 January	S.E. Melbourne	W 100–79	Bryce Cotton (34)	four players (6)	Tai Webster (4)	Perth Arena; 12,859	13–7
21	19 January	Brisbane	W 118–86	Bryce Cotton (28)	Hyrum Harris (11)	Bryce Cotton (7)	Perth Arena; 12,836	14–7
22	21 January	@ Sydney	W 98–104	Bryce Cotton (29)	Kristian Doolittle (7)	Usher, T.Webster (5)	Sydney SuperDome; 13,138	15–7
23	25 January	Illawarra	L 77–95	Tai Webster (16)	Kristian Doolittle (10)	Bryce Cotton (3)	Perth Arena; 12,771	15–8
24	27 January	@ S.E. Melbourne	W 91–103	Tai Webster (23)	Keanu Pinder (11)	Bryce Cotton (8)	State Basketball Centre; 3,422	16–8

February: 1–3 (Home: 1–1; Road: 0–2)

Game	Date	Team	Score	High points	High rebounds	High assists	Location Attendance	Record
25	4 February	New Zealand	L 78–89	Keanu Pinder (21)	Keanu Pinder (15)	Bryce Cotton (6)	Perth Arena; 12,975	16–9
26	10 February	Cairns	W 117–88	Bryce Cotton (26)	Alexandre Sarr (12)	Bryce Cotton (4)	Perth Arena; 12,895	17–9
27	15 February	@ Illawarra	L 108–92	Bryce Cotton (20)	Hyrum Harris (7)	Tai Webster (5)	Wollongong Entertainment Centre; 4,486	17–10
28	17 February	@ Tasmania	L 86–72	Alexandre Sarr (17)	Kristian Doolittle (5)	Henshall, Usher (3)	Derwent Entertainment Centre; 4,340	17–11

2023–24 season schedule

=== Postseason ===
2024 finals game log
Total: 1–2 (Home: 1–1; Road: 0–1)
Semifinals: 1–2 (Home: 1–1; Road: 0–1)

Game	Date	Team	Score	High points	High rebounds	High assists	Location Attendance	Series
1	8 March	Tasmania	W 89–81	Keanu Pinder (25)	Cotton, Pinder (7)	Bryce Cotton (5)	Perth Arena; 10,624	1–0
2	11 March	@ Tasmania	L 102–94	Bryce Cotton (26)	Kristian Doolittle (9)	H.Harris, Usher (4)	Derwent Entertainment Centre; 4,340	1–1
3	13 March	Tasmania	L 84–100	Bryce Cotton (21)	Keanu Pinder (7)	H.Harris, T.Webster (3)	Perth Arena; 7,467	1–2

2024 finals schedule

== Transactions ==
=== Re-signed ===
Player	Date Signed	Contract	Ref.
Michael Harris	7 April 2023	2-year deal	
Tai Webster	21 April 2023	2-year deal (club option)	
Corey Webster	3 May 2023	2-year deal (club option)	
Jesse Wagstaff	2 June 2023	1-year deal	

=== Additions ===
Player	Date Signed	Contract	Former team	Ref.
Keanu Pinder	1 April 2023	2-year deal	Cairns Taipans	
David Okwera	5 April 2023	3-year deal	Melbourne United	
Ben Henshall	17 April 2023	2-year deal	Centre of Excellence	
Hyrum Harris	26 April 2023	2-year deal	Adelaide 36ers	
Alex Sarr	9 May 2023	1-year deal (next star)	YNG Dreamerz (Overtime Elite)	
Dontae Russo-Nance	27 May 2023	3-year deal	Auckland Tuatara	
Jordan Usher	9 August 2023	1-year deal	Beşiktaş	
Kristian Doolittle	26 September 2023	1-year deal	Limoges CSP	

=== Subtractions ===
Player	Reason left	Date Left	New Team	Ref.
Luke Travers	Declined player option	30 March 2023	Melbourne United	
Mitch Norton	Mutual release	19 April 2023	Brisbane Bullets	
Todd Blanchfield	Mutual release	28 June 2023	Illawarra Hawks	
Majok Majok	Free agent	7 August 2023	Tasmania JackJumpers	
Oliver Hayes-Brown	Released	6 September 2023	Richmond (AFL)	

== Awards ==
=== Club awards ===
- Club MVP: Bryce Cotton
- Coaches’ Award: Kyle Zunic
- Most Improved Player: Hyrum Harris
- Best Defensive Player: Kristian Doolittle
- Players’ Player: Bryce Cotton

== See also ==
- 2023–24 NBL season
- Perth Wildcats
