= 2023–24 Melbourne United season =

- Regular season champions
- Head coach: (Australia) Dean Vickerman
- Captain: (Australia) Chris Goulding
- Arena: John Cain Arena

NBL results
- Record: 20–8 (71.4%)
- Ladder: 1st
- Finals finish: Runners-up (lost to JackJumpers 2–3)
- Stats at NBL.com.au

Player records
- Points: (Australia) Goulding 16.9
- Rebounds: (South Sudan) Lual-Acuil 7.9
- Assists: (Australia) Dellavedova 6.0
- All statistics correct as of 31 March 2024.

The 2023–24 Melbourne United season was the 41st season of the franchise in the National Basketball League (NBL), and their 10th under the banner of Melbourne United.

On 19 April 2023, head coach Dean Vickerman signed a four-year contract extension with the club.

== Roster ==
Note: Flags indicate national team eligibility at FIBA-sanctioned events. Players may hold other non-FIBA nationalities not displayed.

2023–24 Melbourne United roster
Players
Coaches

Pos.	No.	Nat.	Name	Ht.	Wt.
C	0	(South Sudan)	Lual-Acuil, Jo	2.11 m (6 ft 11 in)	103 kg (227 lb)
G	1	(Australia)	Triplett, Zac	1.96 m (6 ft 5 in)	85 kg (187 lb)
G	3	(Australia)	Blogg, Campbell (DP)	1.94 m (6 ft 4 in)	88 kg (194 lb)
G/F	4	(Australia)	Newley, Brad	1.98 m (6 ft 6 in)	96 kg (212 lb)
G	8	(Australia)	Dellavedova, Matthew	1.93 m (6 ft 4 in)	91 kg (201 lb)
F	9	(South Sudan)	Machar, Malith (DP)	2.03 m (6 ft 8 in)	85 kg (187 lb)
G	11	(New Zealand)	Cameron, Flynn	1.96 m (6 ft 5 in)	95 kg (209 lb)
G	13	(Australia)	Krebs, Tanner	1.98 m (6 ft 6 in)	95 kg (209 lb)
F	14	(Australia)	Bowen, Kyle	2.04 m (6 ft 8 in)	101 kg (223 lb)
C	15	(Germany)	Hukporti, Ariel (NS)	2.13 m (7 ft 0 in)	113 kg (249 lb)
G	21	(United States)	Clark, Ian (I)	1.90 m (6 ft 3 in)	79 kg (174 lb)
G/F	23	(Australia)	Travers, Luke	2.00 m (6 ft 7 in)	94 kg (207 lb)
F	30	(Australia)	Koppens, Tom (DP)	2.01 m (6 ft 7 in)	84 kg (185 lb)
G	43	(Australia)	Goulding, Chris (C)	1.92 m (6 ft 4 in)	92 kg (203 lb)
G	51	(New Zealand)	Ili, Shea	1.84 m (6 ft 0 in)	88 kg (194 lb)

Head coach

- (Australia) Dean Vickerman

Assistant coach(es)

- (Australia) David Barlow
- (Australia) Rhys Carter
- (Australia) Jacob Chance

Team manager

- (Australia) Stephan Semerci

Legend

- (C) Team captain
- (DP) Development player
- (IN) Inactive
- (I) Import player
- (TP) Training player
- (SRP) Special restricted player
- (NS) Next Star player
- Injured

- Roster
Updated: 24 January 2024

=== Depth chart ===
Pos.	Starting 5	Bench 1	Development
PG	Matthew Dellavedova	Shea Ili	Campbell Blogg
SG	Ian Clark	Flynn Cameron	Zac Triplett
SF	Chris Goulding	Tanner Krebs	Malith Machar
PF	Luke Travers	Brad Newley	Kyle Bowen
C	Jo Lual-Acuil	Ariel Hukporti	Robert Loe

== Standings ==
=== Ladder ===
Pos	2023–24 NBL season											
Pos	Team	Pld	W	L	PCT	Last 5	Streak	Home	Away	PF	PA	PP
1	Melbourne United	28	20	8	71.43%	3–2	W1	11–3	9–5	2615	2454	106.56%
2	Perth Wildcats	28	17	11	60.71%	2–3	L2	10–4	7–7	2630	2563	102.61%
3	Tasmania JackJumpers	28	16	12	57.14%	4–1	W4	8–6	8–6	2564	2378	107.82%
4	Illawarra Hawks	28	14	14	50.00%	3–2	L1	8–6	6–8	2547	2518	101.15%
5	Sydney Kings	28	13	15	46.43%	2–3	W1	7–7	6–8	2672	2602	102.69%
6	New Zealand Breakers	28	13	15	46.43%	3–2	L1	8–6	5–9	2498	2480	100.73%
7	Brisbane Bullets	28	13	15	46.43%	2–3	L1	8–6	5–9	2458	2534	97.00%
8	Cairns Taipans	28	12	16	42.86%	1–4	W1	7–7	5–9	2506	2589	96.79%
9	Adelaide 36ers	28	12	16	42.86%	3–2	W1	9–5	3–11	2457	2563	95.86%
10	S.E. Melbourne Phoenix	28	10	18	35.71%	1–4	L4	7–7	3–11	2425	2691	90.12%

Updated to match(es) played on 18 February 2024. Source: NBL.com.au

The NBL tie-breaker system as outlined in the NBL Rules and Regulations states that in the case of an identical win–loss record, the overall points percentage will determine order of seeding.

=== Ladder progression ===
Leader and qualification to semifinals
Qualification to semifinals
Qualification to play-in games
Last place

2023–24 NBL season
Team ╲ Round	1	2	3	4	5	6	7	8	9	10	11	12	13	14	15	16	17	18	19	20
Adelaide 36ers	9	10	10	9	7	8	8	8	9	10	10	10	10	10	10	9	9	9	9	9
Brisbane Bullets	1	2	6	7	6	5	7	6	6	6	7	9	9	6	5	4	5	6	5	7
Cairns Taipans	8	6	3	4	3	7	6	7	7	7	6	6	7	9	7	6	7	8	8	8
Illawarra Hawks	10	8	9	10	9	10	10	10	10	8	8	8	8	5	6	8	6	4	4	4
Melbourne United	3	1	1	1	1	1	1	1	1	1	1	1	1	1	1	1	1	1	1	1
New Zealand Breakers	4	7	5	6	10	9	9	9	8	9	9	7	6	8	9	7	8	7	6	6
Perth Wildcats	6	5	8	8	8	6	5	4	3	5	3	2	2	2	2	2	2	2	2	2
S.E. Melbourne Phoenix	5	9	7	5	2	3	4	5	5	3	5	5	5	7	8	10	10	10	10	10
Sydney Kings	2	3	2	3	4	2	2	2	4	4	2	4	3	4	4	5	4	5	7	5
Tasmania JackJumpers	7	4	4	2	5	4	3	3	2	2	4	3	4	3	3	3	3	3	3	3

Updated to match(es) played on 18 February 2024. Source: NBL.com.au

== Game log ==
=== Pre-season ===
2023 NBL Blitz game log
Total: 3–0 (Home: 2–0; Road: 1–0)
September: 3–0 (Home: 2–0; Road: 1–0)

Game	Date	Team	Score	High points	High rebounds	High assists	Location Attendance	Record
1	16 September	@ Brisbane	W 92–96	Matthew Dellavedova (28)	Ariel Hukporti (8)	Shea Ili (4)	Gold Coast Convention Centre n/a	1–0
2	18 September	Illawarra	W 85–71	Matthew Dellavedova (20)	Luke Travers (8)	Krebs, Travers (4)	Gold Coast Convention Centre n/a	2–0
3	20 September	Sydney	W 105–87	Luke Travers (21)	Ariel Hukporti (8)	Shea Ili (9)	Gold Coast Convention Centre n/a	3–0

=== Regular season ===
2023–24 game log
Total: 20–8 (Home: 11–3; Road: 9–5)
September: 1–0 (Home: 1–0; Road: 0–0)

Game	Date	Team	Score	High points	High rebounds	High assists	Location Attendance	Record
1	28 September	S.E. Melbourne	W 82–67	Luke Travers (20)	Ariel Hukporti (14)	Dellavedova, Goulding (4)	John Cain Arena; 10,175	1–0

October: 7–1 (Home: 3–1; Road: 4–0)

Game	Date	Team	Score	High points	High rebounds	High assists	Location Attendance	Record
2	1 October	@ Adelaide	W 74–82	Dellavedova, Goulding (19)	Ariel Hukporti (10)	Dellavedova, Travers (4)	Adelaide Entertainment Centre; 8,165	2–0
3	8 October	Tasmania	L 75–80	Ariel Hukporti (15)	Luke Travers (8)	Matthew Dellavedova (6)	John Cain Arena; 10,175	2–1
4	13 October	@ Perth	W 81–88	Clark, Goulding (18)	Ariel Hukporti (7)	Matthew Dellavedova (6)	Perth Arena; 10,982	3–1
5	15 October	Brisbane	W 89–78	Chris Goulding (18)	Ariel Hukporti (12)	Shea Ili (8)	John Cain Arena; 9,327	4–1
6	20 October	@ Illawarra	W 91–101	Ariel Hukporti (21)	Ariel Hukporti (10)	Shea Ili (8)	Wollongong Entertainment Centre; 2,927	5–1
7	22 October	New Zealand	W 97–88	Ian Clark (18)	Ariel Hukporti (6)	Shea Ili (4)	John Cain Arena; 9,579	6–1
8	27 October	@ Tasmania	W 82–90	Ian Clark (19)	Luke Travers (13)	Shea Ili (6)	Derwent Entertainment Centre; 4,340	7–1
9	29 October	Illawarra	W 96–84	Chris Goulding (33)	Luke Travers (11)	Tanner Krebs (4)	John Cain Arena; 9,067	8–1

November: 2–1 (Home: 1–1; Road: 1–0)

Game	Date	Team	Score	High points	High rebounds	High assists	Location Attendance	Record
10	6 November	Perth	L 95–102 (OT)	Jo Lual-Acuil (25)	Kyle Bowen (16)	Dellavedova, Ili (6)	John Cain Arena; 10,175	8–2
11	12 November	@ S.E. Melbourne	W 83–92	Chris Goulding (27)	Jo Lual-Acuil (11)	Shea Ili (4)	John Cain Arena; 10,175	9–2
12	19 November	Sydney	W 105–93	Chris Goulding (35)	Luke Travers (12)	Shea Ili (9)	John Cain Arena; 10,175	10–2

December: 4–2 (Home: 3–1; Road: 1–1)

Game	Date	Team	Score	High points	High rebounds	High assists	Location Attendance	Record
13	3 December	Cairns	L 103–115	Chris Goulding (23)	Jo Lual-Acuil (9)	Matthew Dellavedova (9)	John Cain Arena; 9,384	10–3
14	10 December	Brisbane	W 103–68	Chris Goulding (21)	Ariel Hukporti (8)	Matthew Dellavedova (5)	John Cain Arena; 9,635	11–3
15	14 December	@ S.E. Melbourne	W 78–106	Jo Lual-Acuil (17)	Ariel Hukporti (8)	Matthew Dellavedova (8)	John Cain Arena; 7,672	12–3
16	16 December	Adelaide	W 107–96	Shea Ili (16)	Jo Lual-Acuil (12)	Matthew Dellavedova (7)	John Cain Arena; 7,757	13–3
17	23 December	Perth	W 109–103 (OT)	Ian Clark (25)	Ariel Hukporti (12)	Shea Ili (7)	John Cain Arena; 10,175	14–3
18	31 December	@ Cairns	L 95–78	Jo Lual-Acuil (15)	Hukporti, Travers (7)	Dellavedova, Travers (2)	Cairns Convention Centre; 4,802	14–4

January: 3–3 (Home: 0–0; Road: 3–3)

Game	Date	Team	Score	High points	High rebounds	High assists	Location Attendance	Record
19	4 January	@ Sydney	W 85–101	Shea Ili (19)	Jo Lual-Acuil (9)	Matthew Dellavedova (9)	Sydney SuperDome; 12,898	15–4
20	6 January	@ Adelaide	L 100–96	Tanner Krebs (23)	Jo Lual-Acuil (17)	Matthew Dellavedova (9)	Adelaide Entertainment Centre; 9,564	15–5
21	12 January	@ New Zealand	W 81–82	Chris Goulding (24)	Luke Travers (11)	Matthew Dellavedova (10)	TSB Stadium; 2,632	16–5
22	19 January	@ Tasmania	L 107–86	Chris Goulding (16)	Ariel Hukporti (8)	Matthew Dellavedova (8)	Derwent Entertainment Centre; 4,340	16–6
23	26 January	@ Brisbane	W 77–93	Jo Lual-Acuil (33)	Jo Lual-Acuil (13)	Shea Ili (6)	Nissan Arena; 5,291	17–6
24	28 January	@ Sydney	L 98–86	Luke Travers (15)	Luke Travers (10)	Matthew Dellavedova (6)	Sydney SuperDome; 12,921	17–7

February: 3–1 (Home: 3–0; Road: 0–1)

Game	Date	Team	Score	High points	High rebounds	High assists	Location Attendance	Record
25	3 February	S.E. Melbourne	W 99–83	Jo Lual-Acuil (16)	Ariel Hukporti (10)	Matthew Dellavedova (8)	John Cain Arena; 10,175	18–7
26	11 February	New Zealand	W 94–81	Jo Lual-Acuil (19)	Jo Lual-Acuil (11)	Shea Ili (5)	John Cain Arena; 10,175	19–7
27	16 February	@ Cairns	L 97–88	Ian Clark (20)	Luke Travers (13)	Matthew Dellavedova (5)	Cairns Convention Centre; 4,378	19–8
28	18 February	Illawarra	W 92–87	Chris Goulding (19)	Hukporti, Lual-Acuil (5)	Matthew Dellavedova (5)	John Cain Arena; 10,175	20–8

2023–24 season schedule

=== Postseason ===
2024 finals game log
Total: 4–4 (Home: 3–2; Road: 1–2)
Semifinals: 2–1 (Home: 2–0; Road: 0–1)

Game	Date	Team	Score	High points	High rebounds	High assists	Location Attendance	Series
1	7 March	Illawarra	W 115–106 (OT)	Matthew Dellavedova (30)	Jo Lual-Acuil (9)	Matthew Dellavedova (10)	John Cain Arena; 8,232	1–0
2	10 March	@ Illawarra	L 113–108 (OT)	Matthew Dellavedova (20)	Lual-Acuil, Travers (7)	Matthew Dellavedova (8)	Wollongong Entertainment Centre; 5,631	1–1
3	13 March	Illawarra	W 100–94	Shea Ili (22)	Luke Travers (11)	Matthew Dellavedova (5)	John Cain Arena; 6,288	2–1

NBL Finals: 2–3 (Home: 1–2; Road: 1–1)

Game	Date	Team	Score	High points	High rebounds	High assists	Location Attendance	Series
1	17 March	Tasmania	W 104–81	Chris Goulding (22)	Jo Lual-Acuil (11)	Matthew Dellavedova (6)	John Cain Arena; 9,108	1–0
2	22 March	@ Tasmania	L 82–77	Shea Ili (20)	Jo Lual-Acuil (11)	Matthew Dellavedova (7)	Derwent Entertainment Centre; 4,340	1–1
3	24 March	Tasmania	L 91–93	Matthew Dellavedova (21)	Ariel Hukporti (9)	Matthew Dellavedova (8)	John Cain Arena; 10,175	1–2
4	28 March	@ Tasmania	W 86–88	Ian Clark (18)	Luke Travers (11)	Matthew Dellavedova (6)	Derwent Entertainment Centre; 4,340	2–2
5	31 March	Tasmania	L 81–83	Jo Lual-Acuil (14)	Ariel Hukporti (15)	Matthew Dellavedova (7)	John Cain Arena; 10,175	2–3

2024 finals schedule

== Transactions ==
=== Re-signed ===
Player	Date Signed	Contract	Ref.
Ariel Hukporti	31 March 2023	1-year deal (next star)	
Campbell Blogg	13 April 2023	1-year deal	
Brad Newley	24 April 2023	1-year deal	
Malith Machar	9 June 2023	2-year deal	
Zac Triplett	18 September 2023	1-year deal	

=== Additions ===
Player	Date Signed	Contract	Former team	Ref.
Flynn Cameron	11 April 2023	3-year deal (club option)	UC Riverside Highlanders	
Tanner Krebs	11 April 2023	3-year deal (club option)	Brisbane Bullets	
Jo Lual-Acuil	12 April 2023	2-year deal (club option)	Nanjing Tongxi Monkey Kings	
Luke Travers	17 April 2023	3-year deal	Perth Wildcats	
Kyle Bowen	20 April 2023	2-year deal	Saint Mary's Gaels	
Matthew Dellavedova	17 May 2023	2-year deal	Sacramento Kings	
Robert Loe	28 July 2023	1-year deal (NRP)	New Zealand Breakers	
Ian Clark	4 August 2023	1-year deal	Adelaide 36ers	
Tom Koppens	19 September 2023	1-year deal	Sandringham Sabres	

=== Subtractions ===
Player	Reason left	Date Left	New Team	Ref.
Mason Peatling	Free agent	5 April 2023	Illawarra Hawks	
David Okwera	Free agent	5 April 2023	Perth Wildcats	
Makuach Maluach	Free agent	12 April 2023	Sydney Kings	
Josh Duach	Released	17 April 2023	North Gold Coast Seahawks	
Isaac Humphries	Free agent	22 April 2023	Adelaide 36ers	
Marcus Lee	Free agent	22 June 2023	Tasmania JackJumpers	
Rayjon Tucker	Free agent	16 July 2023	Reyer Venezia	
Lachlan Barker	Free agent	24 July 2023	Tasmania JackJumpers	
David Barlow	Retired	10 August 2023	Melbourne United (assistant)	
Robert Loe	Released (NRP)	23 November 2023	Auckland Tuatara	

== Awards ==
=== Club awards ===
- Club MVP: Chris Goulding
- Defensive Player: Shea Ili
- SHARE Award: Matthew Dellavedova
- Vince Crivelli Club Person of the Year: Steve McAdam

== See also ==
- 2023–24 NBL season
- Melbourne United
