= 2023–24 Adelaide 36ers season =

- Head coach: (Australia) Scott Ninnis
- Captain: (Australia) Mitch McCarron
- Arena: Adelaide Entertainment Centre

NBL results
- Record: 12–16 (42.9%)
- Ladder: 9th
- Finals finish: Did not qualify
- Stats at NBL.com.au

Player records
- Points: (Australia) Vasiljevic 19.7
- Rebounds: (United States) Wiley 7.2
- Assists: (United States) Kell 3.6
- All statistics correct as of 22 February 2024.

The 2023–24 Adelaide 36ers season was the 43rd season of the franchise in the National Basketball League (NBL).

On 6 December 2023, C. J. Bruton parted ways as 36ers' head coach after the team started the season with a 4–9 record and was replaced by Scott Ninnis on an interim basis. On 22 February 2024, Ninnis signed a two-year contract to continue as head coach.

== Roster ==
Note: Flags indicate national team eligibility at FIBA-sanctioned events. Players may hold other non-FIBA nationalities not displayed.

2023–24 Adelaide 36ers roster
Players
Coaches

Pos.	No.	Nat.	Name	Ht.	Wt.
G	1	(United States)	Flowers, Trentyn (injured) (NS)	2.06 m (6 ft 9 in)	93 kg (205 lb)
G	2	(Australia)	Roxburgh, Fraser (DP)	1.96 m (6 ft 5 in)	93 kg (205 lb)
G	3	(United States)	Kell, Trey (injured)	1.93 m (6 ft 4 in)	99 kg (218 lb)
G	7	(Australia)	Cadee, Jason	1.83 m (6 ft 0 in)	80 kg (176 lb)
C	8	(Australia)	Humphries, Isaac	2.11 m (6 ft 11 in)	114 kg (251 lb)
F	9	(Australia)	Marshall, Nick	1.98 m (6 ft 6 in)	88 kg (194 lb)
G	10	(Australia)	McCarron, Mitch (C)	1.89 m (6 ft 2 in)	97 kg (214 lb)
F	14	(Australia)	Galloway, Kyrin	2.03 m (6 ft 8 in)	98 kg (216 lb)
F	18	(New Zealand)	Smith-Milner, Tohi	2.05 m (6 ft 9 in)	117 kg (258 lb)
G	22	(New Zealand)	Rasmussen, Keanu (DP)	1.88 m (6 ft 2 in)	86 kg (190 lb)
F	24	(United States)	Wiley, Jacob (I)	2.03 m (6 ft 8 in)	99 kg (218 lb)
F	25	(Australia)	Rigoni, Jacob (NRP)	1.97 m (6 ft 6 in)	97 kg (214 lb)
F	30	(Australia)	Aliir, Akech (DP)	2.04 m (6 ft 8 in)	102 kg (225 lb)
F	32	(Australia)	Starling, Alex	1.99 m (6 ft 6 in)	99 kg (218 lb)
G	34	(Australia)	Vasiljevic, Dejan	1.90 m (6 ft 3 in)	88 kg (194 lb)
G	43	(Australia)	White, Harvey (DP)	1.86 m (6 ft 1 in)	84 kg (185 lb)
G	44	(South Sudan)	Dech, Sunday	1.95 m (6 ft 5 in)	91 kg (201 lb)

Head coach

- (Australia) Scott Ninnis

Assistant coach(es)

- (Australia) Graham Kubank
- (Australia) Michael Lake

Strength & conditioning coach(es)

- (Australia) Nik Popovic

Legend

- (C) Team captain
- (DP) Development player
- (IN) Inactive
- (I) Import player
- (SRP) Special restricted player
- (NS) Next Star player
- Injured

- Roster
Updated: 22 February 2024

=== Depth chart ===
Pos.	Starting 5	Bench 1	Bench 2	Development
PG	Jason Cadee	Trentyn Flowers	Harvey White
SG	Dejan Vasiljevic	Mitch McCarron	Keanu Rasmussen
SF	Trey Kell	Nick Marshall	Sunday Dech	Fraser Roxburgh
PF	Jacob Wiley	Kyrin Galloway	Alex Starling	Jacob Rigoni
C	Isaac Humphries	Tohi Smith-Milner	Akech Aliir

== Standings ==
=== Ladder ===
Pos	2023–24 NBL season											
Pos	Team	Pld	W	L	PCT	Last 5	Streak	Home	Away	PF	PA	PP
1	Melbourne United	28	20	8	71.43%	3–2	W1	11–3	9–5	2615	2454	106.56%
2	Perth Wildcats	28	17	11	60.71%	2–3	L2	10–4	7–7	2630	2563	102.61%
3	Tasmania JackJumpers	28	16	12	57.14%	4–1	W4	8–6	8–6	2564	2378	107.82%
4	Illawarra Hawks	28	14	14	50.00%	3–2	L1	8–6	6–8	2547	2518	101.15%
5	Sydney Kings	28	13	15	46.43%	2–3	W1	7–7	6–8	2672	2602	102.69%
6	New Zealand Breakers	28	13	15	46.43%	3–2	L1	8–6	5–9	2498	2480	100.73%
7	Brisbane Bullets	28	13	15	46.43%	2–3	L1	8–6	5–9	2458	2534	97.00%
8	Cairns Taipans	28	12	16	42.86%	1–4	W1	7–7	5–9	2506	2589	96.79%
9	Adelaide 36ers	28	12	16	42.86%	3–2	W1	9–5	3–11	2457	2563	95.86%
10	S.E. Melbourne Phoenix	28	10	18	35.71%	1–4	L4	7–7	3–11	2425	2691	90.12%

Updated to match(es) played on 18 February 2024. Source: NBL.com.au

The NBL tie-breaker system as outlined in the NBL Rules and Regulations states that in the case of an identical win–loss record, the overall points percentage will determine order of seeding.

=== Ladder progression ===
Leader and qualification to semifinals
Qualification to semifinals
Qualification to play-in games
Last place

2023–24 NBL season
Team ╲ Round	1	2	3	4	5	6	7	8	9	10	11	12	13	14	15	16	17	18	19	20
Adelaide 36ers	9	10	10	9	7	8	8	8	9	10	10	10	10	10	10	9	9	9	9	9
Brisbane Bullets	1	2	6	7	6	5	7	6	6	6	7	9	9	6	5	4	5	6	5	7
Cairns Taipans	8	6	3	4	3	7	6	7	7	7	6	6	7	9	7	6	7	8	8	8
Illawarra Hawks	10	8	9	10	9	10	10	10	10	8	8	8	8	5	6	8	6	4	4	4
Melbourne United	3	1	1	1	1	1	1	1	1	1	1	1	1	1	1	1	1	1	1	1
New Zealand Breakers	4	7	5	6	10	9	9	9	8	9	9	7	6	8	9	7	8	7	6	6
Perth Wildcats	6	5	8	8	8	6	5	4	3	5	3	2	2	2	2	2	2	2	2	2
S.E. Melbourne Phoenix	5	9	7	5	2	3	4	5	5	3	5	5	5	7	8	10	10	10	10	10
Sydney Kings	2	3	2	3	4	2	2	2	4	4	2	4	3	4	4	5	4	5	7	5
Tasmania JackJumpers	7	4	4	2	5	4	3	3	2	2	4	3	4	3	3	3	3	3	3	3

Updated to match(es) played on 18 February 2024. Source: NBL.com.au

== Game log ==
=== Pre-season ===
2023 NBL Blitz game log
Total: 0–3 (Home: 0–1; Road: 0–2)
September: 0–3 (Home: 0–1; Road: 0–2)

Game	Date	Team	Score	High points	High rebounds	High assists	Location Attendance	Record
1	17 September	New Zealand	L 75–101	Isaac Humphries (22)	Isaac Humphries (7)	three players (3)	Gold Coast Convention Centre n/a	0–1
2	19 September	@ Perth	L 112–80	Cadee, Franklin (15)	Trentyn Flowers (6)	Jason Cadee (4)	Gold Coast Convention Centre n/a	0–2
3	21 September	@ Tasmania	L 86–82	Tohi Smith-Milner (21)	Mitch McCarron (7)	Mitch McCarron (10)	Gold Coast Convention Centre n/a	0–3

=== Regular season ===
2023–24 game log
Total: 12–16 (Home: 9–5; Road: 3–11)
September: 0–1 (Home: 0–0; Road: 0–1)

Game	Date	Team	Score	High points	High rebounds	High assists	Location Attendance	Record
1	29 September	@ Brisbane	L 86–71	Isaac Humphries (17)	Jacob Wiley (9)	Kell, Wiley (5)	Nissan Arena; 4,286	0–1

October: 3–4 (Home: 2–2; Road: 1–2)

Game	Date	Team	Score	High points	High rebounds	High assists	Location Attendance	Record
2	1 October	Melbourne	L 74–82	Jason Cadee (18)	Kyrin Galloway (9)	Jason Cadee (6)	Adelaide Entertainment Centre; 8,165	0–2
3	6 October	@ Perth	L 82–75	Isaac Humphries (18)	Jacob Wiley (8)	Cadee, McCarron (4)	Perth Arena; 11,306	0–3
4	8 October	@ Sydney	L 109–100	Trey Kell (28)	Mitch McCarron (10)	Jacob Wiley (5)	Sydney SuperDome; 14,029	0–4
5	14 October	Illawarra	W 89–80	Trey Kell (25)	Kell, Wiley (9)	Jason Cadee (4)	Adelaide Entertainment Centre; 9,108	1–4
6	19 October	S.E. Melbourne	L 85–102	Trey Kell (21)	Jacob Wiley (8)	three players (2)	Adelaide Entertainment Centre; 6,870	1–5
7	21 October	Perth	W 89–78	Isaac Humphries (26)	Humphries, Wiley (8)	Dejan Vasiljevic (6)	Adelaide Entertainment Centre; 8,140	2–5
8	26 October	@ New Zealand	W 85–97	Dejan Vasiljevic (24)	Jacob Wiley (13)	Dejan Vasiljevic (5)	Spark Arena; 4,646	3–5

November: 1–3 (Home: 1–1; Road: 0–2)

Game	Date	Team	Score	High points	High rebounds	High assists	Location Attendance	Record
9	4 November	@ Perth	L 99–88	Trey Kell (25)	Alex Starling (6)	Trey Kell (6)	Perth Arena; 11,326	3–6
10	11 November	Tasmania	L 72–82	Dejan Vasiljevic (16)	Mitch McCarron (8)	Nick Marshall (4)	Adelaide Entertainment Centre; 9,440	3–7
11	17 November	S.E. Melbourne	W 96–93	Dejan Vasiljevic (29)	Jacob Wiley (14)	Jason Cadee (4)	Adelaide Entertainment Centre; 7,833	4–7
12	30 November	@ New Zealand	L 96–83	Dejan Vasiljevic (14)	Jacob Wiley (12)	Dejan Vasiljevic (4)	Christchurch Arena; 3,936	4–8

December: 1–5 (Home: 1–2; Road: 0–3)

Game	Date	Team	Score	High points	High rebounds	High assists	Location Attendance	Record
13	2 December	@ Tasmania	L 94–59	Dejan Vasiljevic (14)	Alex Starling (8)	Alex Starling (3)	Derwent Entertainment Centre; 4,340	4–9
14	9 December	Cairns	L 101–116	Dejan Vasiljevic (30)	Isaac Humphries (9)	Trey Kell (6)	Adelaide Entertainment Centre; 8,954	4–10
15	16 December	@ Melbourne	L 107–96	Dejan Vasiljevic (23)	Jacob Wiley (9)	Dejan Vasiljevic (6)	John Cain Arena; 7,757	4–11
16	24 December	Brisbane	W 95–88	Dejan Vasiljevic (23)	Jacob Wiley (12)	Dejan Vasiljevic (6)	Adelaide Entertainment Centre; 9,440	5–11
17	28 December	Perth	L 82–100	Isaac Humphries (24)	Alex Starling (7)	Dejan Vasiljevic (5)	Adelaide Entertainment Centre; 9,468	5–12
18	31 December	@ Illawarra	L 91–84	Isaac Humphries (26)	Trey Kell (10)	Trey Kell (12)	Wollongong Entertainment Centre; 5,101	5–13

January: 5–1 (Home: 3–0; Road: 2–1)

Game	Date	Team	Score	High points	High rebounds	High assists	Location Attendance	Record
19	6 January	Melbourne	W 100–96	Dejan Vasiljevic (30)	Trey Kell (10)	Trey Kell (5)	Adelaide Entertainment Centre; 9,564	6–13
20	11 January	Sydney	W 95–82	Trey Kell (27)	Isaac Humphries (12)	Dejan Vasiljevic (8)	Adelaide Entertainment Centre; 9,580	7–13
21	13 January	@ Cairns	L 111–101 (OT)	Isaac Humphries (28)	Isaac Humphries (11)	Trey Kell (3)	Cairns Convention Centre; 4,659	7–14
22	17 January	@ S.E. Melbourne	W 85–110	Isaac Humphries (25)	three players (7)	three players (4)	State Basketball Centre; 3,422	8–14
23	20 January	@ Illawarra	W 89–96	Trey Kell (26)	Isaac Humphries (10)	Nick Marshall (3)	Wollongong Entertainment Centre; 3,555	9–14
24	27 January	Cairns	W 88–71	Dejan Vasiljevic (28)	Kyrin Galloway (8)	three players (3)	Adelaide Entertainment Centre; 9,471	10–14

February: 2–2 (Home: 2–0; Road: 0–2)

Game	Date	Team	Score	High points	High rebounds	High assists	Location Attendance	Record
25	2 February	Sydney	W 85–78	Humphries, Vasiljevic (20)	Isaac Humphries (11)	Trey Kell (7)	Adelaide Entertainment Centre; 9,434	11–14
26	4 February	@ Tasmania	L 109–86	Trey Kell (29)	Trey Kell (10)	Nick Marshall (4)	Derwent Entertainment Centre; 4,340	11–15
27	9 February	@ Brisbane	L 102–84	Dejan Vasiljevic (28)	Trey Kell (10)	Mitch McCarron (4)	Nissan Arena; 4,987	11–16
28	18 February	New Zealand	W 76–70	Dejan Vasiljevic (25)	Dejan Vasiljevic (14)	Mitch McCarron (6)	Adelaide Entertainment Centre; 9,513	12–16

2023–24 season schedule

== Transactions ==
=== Re-signed ===
Player	Date Signed	Contract	Ref.
Nick Marshall	1 March 2023	3-year deal (club option)	
Fraser Roxburgh	4 July 2023	1-year deal	

=== Additions ===
Player	Date Signed	Contract	Former team	Ref.
Jason Cadee	6 April 2023	2-year deal	Brisbane Bullets	
Isaac Humphries	26 April 2023	1-year deal	Melbourne United	
Keanu Rasmussen	1 May 2023	1-year deal	California Baptist Lancers	
Alex Starling	23 May 2023	1-year deal	South Adelaide Panthers	
Akech Aliir	4 July 2023	1-year deal	North Adelaide Rockets	
Harvey White	4 July 2023	1-year deal	Sturt Sabres	
Jacob Wiley	6 July 2023	2-year deal (club option)	Vaqueros de Bayamón	
Jamaal Franklin	28 July 2023	1-year deal	Converge FiberXers	
Trey Kell	31 July 2023	1-year deal	S.E. Melbourne Phoenix	
Trentyn Flowers	15 August 2023	1-year deal (next star)	Louisville Cardinals	
Tohi Smith-Milner	26 August 2023	1-year deal	S.E. Melbourne Phoenix	
Jacob Rigoni	8 September 2023	1-year deal (NRP)	Sturt Sabres	
Dejan Vasiljevic	17 October 2024	1-year deal	Sydney Kings	

=== Subtractions ===
Player	Reason left	Date Left	New Team	Ref.
Kai Sotto	Free agent	6 February 2023	Hiroshima Dragonflies	
Anthony Drmic	Free agent	17 April 2023	Tasmania JackJumpers	
Hyrum Harris	Free agent	26 April 2023	Perth Wildcats	
Robert Franks	Released	18 July 2023	Nagoya Diamond Dolphins	
Antonius Cleveland	Released	27 July 2023	Maccabi Tel Aviv	
Ian Clark	Free agent	4 August 2023	Melbourne United	
Jamaal Franklin	Mutual release	25 September 2023	TBC	
Daniel Johnson	Parted ways	9 November 2023	S.E. Melbourne Phoenix	

== Awards ==
=== Club awards ===
- Club MVP: Isaac Humphries
- Most Improved: Kyrin Galloway
- Coaches Award: Jason Cadee
- Members Choice: Dejan Vasiljevic
- Best Defensive Player: Sunday Dech
- Chairman's Award: Scott Ninnis

== See also ==
- 2023–24 NBL season
- Adelaide 36ers
