= 2023–24 New Zealand Breakers season =

- Head coach: (Israel) Mody Maor
- Captain: (New Zealand) Thomas Abercrombie
- Arena: Spark Arena

NBL results
- Record: 13–15 (46.4%)
- Ladder: 6th
- Finals finish: Play-in finalist (lost to Hawks 85–88)
- Stats at NBL.com.au

Player records
- Points: (United States) Jackson-Cartwright 20.2
- Rebounds: (United States) Cheatham 6.8
- Assists: (United States) Jackson-Cartwright 5.7
- All statistics correct as of 4 March 2024.

The 2023–24 New Zealand Breakers season was the 21st season of the franchise in the National Basketball League (NBL).

== Roster ==
Note: Flags indicate national team eligibility at FIBA-sanctioned events. Players may hold other non-FIBA nationalities not displayed.

2023–24 New Zealand Breakers roster
Players
Coaches

Pos.	No.	Nat.	Name	Ht.	Wt.
G	0	(New Zealand)	McNaught, Alex (DP)	1.83 m (6 ft 0 in)	90 kg (198 lb)
G	2	(New Zealand)	Le'afa, Izayah	1.88 m (6 ft 2 in)	90 kg (198 lb)
G	3	(Australia)	Gliddon, Cameron	1.96 m (6 ft 5 in)	90 kg (198 lb)
G	6	(United States)	Jackson-Cartwright, Parker (I)	1.80 m (5 ft 11 in)	74 kg (163 lb)
G	7	(Australia)	McDowell-White, Will	1.96 m (6 ft 5 in)	89 kg (196 lb)
C	8	(South Sudan)	Mathiang, Mangok	2.08 m (6 ft 10 in)	102 kg (225 lb)
G/F	10	(New Zealand)	Abercrombie, Thomas (C)	1.99 m (6 ft 6 in)	91 kg (201 lb)
F	12	(New Zealand)	Darling, Max (DP)	1.98 m (6 ft 6 in)	118 kg (260 lb)
G	17	(Lithuania)	Rubštavičius, Mantas (NS)	1.99 m (6 ft 6 in)	89 kg (196 lb)
G	21	(New Zealand)	Davison, Carlin (DP)	1.96 m (6 ft 5 in)	95 kg (209 lb)
C	22	(Australia)	Pineau, Dane	2.06 m (6 ft 9 in)	103 kg (227 lb)
F	25	(New Zealand)	Kelman-Poto, Dominique (NRP)	1.95 m (6 ft 5 in)	120 kg (265 lb)
G	37	(United States)	Jessup, Justinian (injured) (IN)	1.98 m (6 ft 6 in)	97 kg (214 lb)
F	42	(New Zealand)	Fotu, Dan	2.01 m (6 ft 7 in)	102 kg (225 lb)
F	44	(United States)	Lamb, Anthony (injured)	1.98 m (6 ft 6 in)	103 kg (227 lb)
F	45	(United States)	Cheatham, Zylan (I)	2.03 m (6 ft 8 in)	105 kg (231 lb)
F	70	(New Zealand)	Delany, Finn	2.00 m (6 ft 7 in)	106 kg (234 lb)

Head coach

- (Israel) Mody Maor

Assistant coach(es)

- (Hungary) Mate Jakab
- (United States) David Pavlakovich
- (United States) Daniel Sokolovsky

Strength & conditioning coach(es)

- (New Zealand) Emily Nolan

Legend

- (C) Team captain
- (DP) Development player
- (IN) Inactive
- (I) Import player
- (SRP) Special restricted player
- (NS) Next Star player
- Injured

- Roster
Updated: 28 February 2024

=== Depth chart ===
Pos.	Starting 5	Bench 1	Bench 2	Development
PG	Will McDowell-White	Parker Jackson-Cartwright	Alex McNaught
SG	Izayah Le'afa	Justinian Jessup	Cameron Gliddon
SF	Mantas Rubštavičius	Thomas Abercrombie	Dan Fotu	Carlin Davison
PF	Zylan Cheatham	Finn Delany	Max Darling	Dominique Kelman-Poto
C	Mangok Mathiang	Dane Pineau

== Standings ==
=== Ladder ===
Pos	2023–24 NBL season											
Pos	Team	Pld	W	L	PCT	Last 5	Streak	Home	Away	PF	PA	PP
1	Melbourne United	28	20	8	71.43%	3–2	W1	11–3	9–5	2615	2454	106.56%
2	Perth Wildcats	28	17	11	60.71%	2–3	L2	10–4	7–7	2630	2563	102.61%
3	Tasmania JackJumpers	28	16	12	57.14%	4–1	W4	8–6	8–6	2564	2378	107.82%
4	Illawarra Hawks	28	14	14	50.00%	3–2	L1	8–6	6–8	2547	2518	101.15%
5	Sydney Kings	28	13	15	46.43%	2–3	W1	7–7	6–8	2672	2602	102.69%
6	New Zealand Breakers	28	13	15	46.43%	3–2	L1	8–6	5–9	2498	2480	100.73%
7	Brisbane Bullets	28	13	15	46.43%	2–3	L1	8–6	5–9	2458	2534	97.00%
8	Cairns Taipans	28	12	16	42.86%	1–4	W1	7–7	5–9	2506	2589	96.79%
9	Adelaide 36ers	28	12	16	42.86%	3–2	W1	9–5	3–11	2457	2563	95.86%
10	S.E. Melbourne Phoenix	28	10	18	35.71%	1–4	L4	7–7	3–11	2425	2691	90.12%

Updated to match(es) played on 18 February 2024. Source: NBL.com.au

The NBL tie-breaker system as outlined in the NBL Rules and Regulations states that in the case of an identical win–loss record, the overall points percentage will determine order of seeding.

=== Ladder progression ===
Leader and qualification to semifinals
Qualification to semifinals
Qualification to play-in games
Last place

2023–24 NBL season
Team ╲ Round	1	2	3	4	5	6	7	8	9	10	11	12	13	14	15	16	17	18	19	20
Adelaide 36ers	9	10	10	9	7	8	8	8	9	10	10	10	10	10	10	9	9	9	9	9
Brisbane Bullets	1	2	6	7	6	5	7	6	6	6	7	9	9	6	5	4	5	6	5	7
Cairns Taipans	8	6	3	4	3	7	6	7	7	7	6	6	7	9	7	6	7	8	8	8
Illawarra Hawks	10	8	9	10	9	10	10	10	10	8	8	8	8	5	6	8	6	4	4	4
Melbourne United	3	1	1	1	1	1	1	1	1	1	1	1	1	1	1	1	1	1	1	1
New Zealand Breakers	4	7	5	6	10	9	9	9	8	9	9	7	6	8	9	7	8	7	6	6
Perth Wildcats	6	5	8	8	8	6	5	4	3	5	3	2	2	2	2	2	2	2	2	2
S.E. Melbourne Phoenix	5	9	7	5	2	3	4	5	5	3	5	5	5	7	8	10	10	10	10	10
Sydney Kings	2	3	2	3	4	2	2	2	4	4	2	4	3	4	4	5	4	5	7	5
Tasmania JackJumpers	7	4	4	2	5	4	3	3	2	2	4	3	4	3	3	3	3	3	3	3

Updated to match(es) played on 18 February 2024. Source: NBL.com.au

== Game log ==
=== Pre-season ===
2023 NBL Blitz game log
Total: 1–2 (Home: 0–1; Road: 1–1)
September: 1–2 (Home: 0–1; Road: 1–1)

Game	Date	Team	Score	High points	High rebounds	High assists	Location Attendance	Record
1	17 September	@ Adelaide	W 75–101	Cameron Gliddon (19)	Zylan Cheatham (9)	Parker Jackson-Cartwright (8)	Gold Coast Convention Centre n/a	1–0
2	19 September	Tasmania	W 85–92	Cameron Gliddon (17)	Zylan Cheatham (10)	Gliddon, Jackson-Cartwright (5)	Gold Coast Convention Centre n/a	1–1
3	21 September	@ Perth	L 93–89	Delany, Jackson-Cartwright (15)	Cheatham, Mathiang (6)	Parker Jackson-Cartwright (10)	Gold Coast Convention Centre n/a	1–2

=== NBLxNBA games ===
2023 pre-season game log
Total: 0–2 (Home: 0–0; Road: 0–2)
October: 0–2 (Home: 0–0; Road: 0–2)

Game	Date	Team	Score	High points	High rebounds	High assists	Location Attendance	Record
1	10 October	@ Portland	L 66–106	Parker Jackson-Cartwright (19)	Zylan Cheatham (10)	Zylan Cheatham (4)	Moda Center; 12,694	0–1
2	16 October	@ Utah	L 94–114	Anthony Lamb (23)	Anthony Lamb (7)	Parker Jackson-Cartwright (6)	Delta Center; 14,190	0–2

=== Regular season ===
2023–24 game log
Total: 13–15 (Home: 8–6; Road: 5–9)
September: 1–0 (Home: 1–0; Road: 0–0)

Game	Date	Team	Score	High points	High rebounds	High assists	Location Attendance	Record
1	30 September	Cairns	W 98–87	Parker Jackson-Cartwright (25)	Mangok Mathiang (5)	Parker Jackson-Cartwright (8)	Spark Arena; 6,400	1–0

October: 0–4 (Home: 0–2; Road: 0–2)

Game	Date	Team	Score	High points	High rebounds	High assists	Location Attendance	Record
2	5 October	Brisbane	L 84–89	Parker Jackson-Cartwright (20)	Zylan Cheatham (6)	Parker Jackson-Cartwright (5)	Spark Arena; 6,280	1–1
3	22 October	@ Melbourne	L 97–88	Zylan Cheatham (30)	Will McDowell-White (7)	Will McDowell-White (9)	John Cain Arena; 9,579	1–2
4	26 October	Adelaide	L 85–97	Anthony Lamb (25)	Zylan Cheatham (8)	Will McDowell-White (11)	Spark Arena; 4,646	1–3
5	28 October	@ S.E. Melbourne	L 103–100	Parker Jackson-Cartwright (33)	Mangok Mathiang (9)	Parker Jackson-Cartwright (8)	John Cain Arena; 6,195	1–4

November: 3–3 (Home: 2–1; Road: 1–2)

Game	Date	Team	Score	High points	High rebounds	High assists	Location Attendance	Record
6	3 November	Cairns	W 91–81	Anthony Lamb (19)	Mangok Mathiang (11)	Parker Jackson-Cartwright (7)	Christchurch Arena; 4,909	2–4
7	5 November	Sydney	L 87–85	Anthony Lamb (29)	Will McDowell-White (8)	Parker Jackson-Cartwright (5)	Sydney SuperDome; 12,143	2–5
8	10 November	@ Perth	L 94–76	Anthony Lamb (25)	Mangok Mathiang (14)	Will McDowell-White (6)	Perth Arena; 10,685	2–6
9	16 November	@ Tasmania	W 92–97	Anthony Lamb (24)	Anthony Lamb (11)	Parker Jackson-Cartwright (3)	Silverdome; 3,255	3–6
10	19 November	Illawarra	L 65–69	Jackson-Cartwright, Lamb (20)	Anthony Lamb (7)	Parker Jackson-Cartwright (6)	Spark Arena; 5,703	3–7
11	30 November	Adelaide	W 96–83	Anthony Lamb (24)	Jackson-Cartwright, Lamb (6)	Parker Jackson-Cartwright (9)	Christchurch Arena; 3,936	4–7

December: 3–2 (Home: 1–1; Road: 2–1)

Game	Date	Team	Score	High points	High rebounds	High assists	Location Attendance	Record
12	2 December	@ S.E. Melbourne	L 90–79	Izayah Le'afa (17)	Mangok Mathiang (8)	Parker Jackson-Cartwright (7)	John Cain Arena; 6,244	4–8
13	9 December	Tasmania	L 80–97	Parker Jackson-Cartwright (25)	Anthony Lamb (9)	Parker Jackson-Cartwright (6)	Spark Arena; 4,908	4–9
14	15 December	@ Cairns	W 82–111	Anthony Lamb (29)	Lamb, Rubštavičius (8)	Parker Jackson-Cartwright (8)	Cairns Convention Centre; 3,584	5–9
15	22 December	Sydney	W 109–101	Anthony Lamb (24)	Mangok Mathiang (5)	Parker Jackson-Cartwright (9)	Spark Arena; 5,228	6–9
16	27 December	@ Brisbane	W 71–81	Anthony Lamb (18)	Anthony Lamb (13)	Parker Jackson-Cartwright (7)	Nissan Arena; 4,796	7–9

January: 3–4 (Home: 2–2; Road: 1–2)

Game	Date	Team	Score	High points	High rebounds	High assists	Location Attendance	Record
17	1 January	@ Tasmania	W 93–98	Parker Jackson-Cartwright (27)	Mangok Mathiang (7)	Will McDowell-White (6)	Derwent Entertainment Centre; 4,340	8–9
18	7 January	Perth	L 102–108	Anthony Lamb (27)	Anthony Lamb (8)	Parker Jackson-Cartwright (9)	Spark Arena; 6,280	8–10
19	12 January	Melbourne	L 81–82	Anthony Lamb (22)	Zylan Cheatham (10)	Parker Jackson-Cartwright (5)	TSB Stadium; 2,632	8–11
20	14 January	@ Sydney	L 105–76	Izayah Le'afa (15)	Mangok Mathiang (5)	Anthony Lamb (5)	Sydney SuperDome; 16,605	8–12
21	20 January	S.E. Melbourne	W 106–75	Anthony Lamb (31)	Mangok Mathiang (8)	Jackson-Cartwright, McDowell-White (7)	Spark Arena; 4,940	9–12
22	26 January	Tasmania	W 94–88	Parker Jackson-Cartwright (25)	Cheatham, Mathiang (5)	Anthony Lamb (5)	North Shore Events Centre; 2,272	10–12
23	28 January	@ Illawarra	L 89–85	Zylan Cheatham (19)	Zylan Cheatham (11)	Anthony Lamb (4)	Wollongong Entertainment Centre; 4,239	10–13

February: 3–2 (Home: 2–0; Road: 1–2)

Game	Date	Team	Score	High points	High rebounds	High assists	Location Attendance	Record
24	4 February	@ Perth	W 78–89	Zylan Cheatham (24)	Mangok Mathiang (9)	Jackson-Cartwright, Le'afa (5)	Perth Arena; 12,975	11–13
25	9 February	Illawarra	W 88–85	Parker Jackson-Cartwright (31)	Zylan Cheatham (15)	Parker Jackson-Cartwright (7)	Spark Arena; 3,941	12–13
26	11 February	@ Melbourne	L 94–81	Parker Jackson-Cartwright (24)	Zylan Cheatham (12)	Parker Jackson-Cartwright (5)	John Cain Arena; 10,175	12–14
27	16 February	Brisbane	W 103–87	Parker Jackson-Cartwright (27)	Will McDowell-White (7)	Parker Jackson-Cartwright (8)	Spark Arena; 6,085	13–14
28	18 February	@ Adelaide	L 76–70	Parker Jackson-Cartwright (24)	Zylan Cheatham (13)	Zylan Cheatham (4)	Adelaide Entertainment Centre; 9,513	13–15

2023–24 season schedule

=== Postseason ===
2024 finals game log
Total: 1–1 (Home: 0–0; Road: 1–1)
Play-in qualifier: 1–0 (Home: 0–0; Road: 1–0)

Game	Date	Team	Score	High points	High rebounds	High assists	Location Attendance	Series
1	28 February	@ Sydney	W 76–83	Parker Jackson-Cartwright (34)	Mangok Mathiang (10)	Parker Jackson-Cartwright (6)	Sydney SuperDome; 8,231	1–0

Play-in game: 0–1 (Home: 0–0; Road: 0–1)

Game	Date	Team	Score	High points	High rebounds	High assists	Location Attendance	Series
1	4 March	@ Illawarra	L 88–85	Parker Jackson-Cartwright (19)	Zylan Cheatham (9)	Parker Jackson-Cartwright (9)	Wollongong Entertainment Centre; 5,178	0–1

2024 finals schedule

== Transactions ==
=== Re-signed ===
Player	Date Signed	Contract	Ref.
Alex McNaught	27 March 2023	3-year deal	
Will McDowell-White	11 April 2023	2-year deal (club option)	
Thomas Abercrombie	10 May 2023	1-year deal	

=== Additions ===
Player	Date Signed	Contract	Former team	Ref.
Mangok Mathiang	13 June 2023	1-year deal	Hapoel Eilat	
Mantas Rubštavičius	14 June 2023	1-year deal (next star)	Lietkabelis Panevėžys	
Dane Pineau	20 June 2023	2-year deal	S.E. Melbourne Phoenix	
Finn Delany	13 July 2023	2-year deal	Telekom Baskets Bonn	
Zylan Cheatham	18 July 2023	1-year deal	Bayern Munich	
Parker Jackson-Cartwright	2 August 2023	1-year deal	Beşiktaş	
Justinian Jessup	10 August 2023	1-year deal	Zaragoza	
Carlin Davison	1 September 2023	3-year deal (club option)	Taranaki Airs	
Dominique Kelman-Poto	5 September 2023	1-year deal (NRP)	Franklin Bulls	
Max Darling	12 September 2023	3-year deal (club option)	Canterbury Rams	
Anthony Lamb	10 October 2023	1-year deal	Golden State Warriors	

=== Subtractions ===
Player	Reason left	Date Left	New Team	Ref.
Jarrell Brantley	Free agent	18 March 2023	Utah Jazz	
Barry Brown Jr.	Free agent	15 May 2023	Metropolitans 92	
Robert Loe	Retired	7 June 2023	Auckland Tuatara	
Tom Vodanovich	Released	21 June 2023	Wellington Saints	
Rayan Rupert	NBA draft	23 June 2023	Portland Trail Blazers	
Dererk Pardon	Free agent	28 June 2023	Altiri Chiba	
Sam Timmins	Free agent	20 July 2023	Sydney Kings	

== Awards ==
=== Club awards ===
- Club MVP: Parker Jackson-Cartwright
- Defensive Player: Izayah Le'afa
- Fan's Memorable Moment: Thomas Abercrombie
- Blackwell Community Cup: BNZ
- Clubman Award: Thomas Abercrombie
- Member’s Choice Award: Anthony Lamb

== See also ==
- 2023–24 NBL season
- New Zealand Breakers
