= AJ Johnson (basketball) =

American basketball player (born 2004)

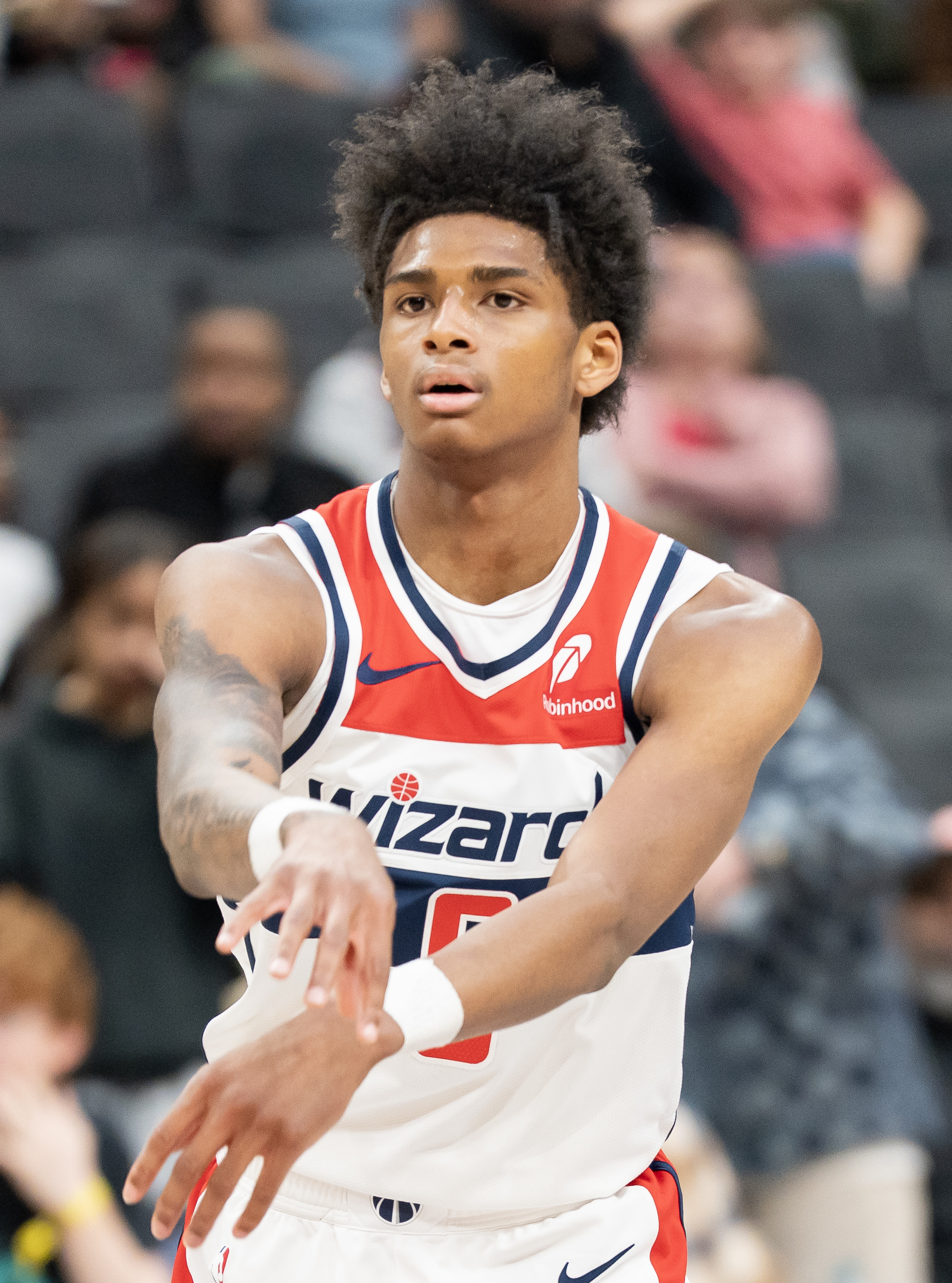
- Johnson with the Washington Wizards in 2025

No. 14 – New Orleans Pelicans
- Position: Shooting guard
- League: NBA

Personal information
- Born: December 1, 2004 (age 21) Fresno, California, U.S.
- Listed height: 6 ft 6 in (1.98 m)
- Listed weight: 175 lb (79 kg)

Career information
- High school: William Howard Taft (Woodland Hills, California); Donda Academy (Simi Valley, California); Southern California Academy (Castaic, California)
- NBA draft: 2024: 1st round, 23rd overall pick
- Drafted by: Milwaukee Bucks
- Playing career: 2023–present

Career history
- 2023–2024: Illawarra Hawks
- 2024–2025: Milwaukee Bucks
- 2024–2025: →Wisconsin Herd
- 2025–2026: Washington Wizards
- 2025: →Capital City Go-Go
- 2026: Dallas Mavericks
- 2026: →Texas Legends
- 2026–present: New Orleans Pelicans

Career highlights
- NBA Cup champion (2024)
- Stats at NBA.com
- Stats at Basketball Reference

Akeem Jamaal "AJ" Johnson (born December 1, 2004) is an American professional basketball player for the New Orleans Pelicans of the National Basketball Association (NBA). He had also played for the Illawarra Hawks of the Australian National Basketball League (NBL).

== Early life and career ==
Johnson was born in Fresno, California. He grew up around Phoenix Suns guard Jalen Green and considered Green to be like a big brother.

Sometime in 2020, during the COVID-19 pandemic, Johnson had a growth spurt where he grew from 5 ft 10 in (1.78 m) to 6 ft 5 in (1.96 m).

== High school career ==
Johnson started his high school career at San Joaquin Memorial in Fresno, California before spending two years at Taft High School where he emerged as one of the biggest risers in part of a growth spurt in the 2023 class being one of the best combo-guards. Johnson for his senior year decided to attend Donda Academy, Kanye West's school in Simi Valley, California. After Donda Academy closed, Johnson finished his senior year at Southern California Academy. Johnson signed with Bill Duffy and WME Basketball.

=== Recruiting ===
Johnson was seen as one of the best guards and combo guards in the 2023 class. At one point, Johnson was ranked as the 9th or 10th best player in the class by Rivals, ESPN, 247Sports, and On3. On November 21, 2022, Johnson committed to the University of Texas choosing Texas over Louisville, USC, LSU and several other high-profile offers such as the NBL and NBA G League Ignite. On April 13, 2023, Johnson announced his decommitment from Texas and announced his plan to sign with the Illawarra Hawks of the National Basketball League in Australia, joining LaMelo Ball, who went from a 2nd round pick to potential 1st pick with NBL's Next Stars program, as the second player to join the team out of high school.

College recruiting
Name	Hometown	School	Height	Weight	Commit date
AJ Johnson; PG	Fresno, CA	Southern California Academy (CA)	6 ft 5 in (1.96 m)	165 lb (75 kg)	—
AJ Johnson; PG	Recruit ratings: Rivals: 247Sports: On3: ESPN: (87)				
Overall recruit ranking: Rivals: — 247Sports: 24 On3: 14 ESPN: 47
Note: In many cases, Scout, Rivals, 247Sports, On3, and ESPN may conflict in their listings of height and weight.; In these cases, the average was taken. ESPN grades are on a 100-point scale.; Sources: "2023 Team Ranking". Rivals.

== Professional career ==
=== Illawarra Hawks (2023–2024) ===
On April 13, 2023, Johnson signed a contract with the Illawarra Hawks of the National Basketball League in Australia, joining the NBL's Next Stars program. Johnson joined LaMelo Ball in 2019 as the other American-born prospect to join the Hawks. Johnson averaged 2.9 points, 1.3 rebounds, and 0.7 assists per game in 7.7 minutes per contest playing 26 games during his time with the Hawks.

=== Milwaukee Bucks (2024–2025) ===
On June 26, 2024, Johnson was drafted with the 23rd overall pick by the Milwaukee Bucks in the 2024 NBA draft. It was called a "surprising pick" and a reach by an older Bucks team as Johnson was expected to be selected somewhere in the second round, and was seen as a project despite late first round interest by teams. On July 5, he signed with the Bucks.

Johnson made his NBA debut on October 23, 2024, in a 124–109 win over the Philadelphia 76ers and throughout his rookie season, he has been assigned several times to the Wisconsin Herd.

=== Washington Wizards (2025–2026) ===
On February 6, 2025, Johnson was traded to the Washington Wizards in a four-team trade, alongside Khris Middleton. On March 17, Johnson made his first career start in a 112–97 loss to the Portland Trail Blazers, contributing eight points, seven rebounds, four assists, and one block. He made 22 appearances (including 11 starts) for Washington down the stretch, recording averages of 9.1 points, 2.4 rebounds, and 3.1 assists.

Johnson appeared in 25 contests for the Wizards in the 2025–26 NBA season, averaging 2.8 points, 1.2 rebounds, and 0.9 assists.

=== Dallas Mavericks (2026) ===
On February 5, 2026, Johnson, along with Marvin Bagley III, Tyus Jones, and Khris Middleton were traded to the Dallas Mavericks in exchange for Anthony Davis, Jaden Hardy, D'Angelo Russell, and Dante Exum, in a three team trade that sent Malaki Branham to the Charlotte Hornets. As part of the trade, the Wizards also shipped off two first-round and three second-round picks to help facilitate the deal. Johnson made 23 appearances for the Mavericks, averaging 3.9 points, 1.0 rebounds, and 1.1 assists.

=== New Orleans Pelicans (2026–present) ===
On July 8, 2026, Johnson was traded to the Memphis Grizzlies in a six-team, 11-player trade. On September 8, without appearing in a game for the Grizzlies, Johnson, along with Taj Gibson, was traded to the New Orleans Pelicans in exchange for Micah Peavy, Jordan Hawkins, a future second-round draft pick, and a second-round pick swap.

== Career statistics ==
Legend
GP	Games played	GS	Games started	MPG	Minutes per game
FG%	Field goal percentage	3P%	3-point field goal percentage	FT%	Free throw percentage
RPG	Rebounds per game	APG	Assists per game	SPG	Steals per game
BPG	Blocks per game	PPG	Points per game	**Bold**	Career high

=== NBA ===
Year	Team	GP	GS	MPG	FG%	3P%	FT%	RPG	APG	SPG	BPG	PPG
2024–25	Milwaukee	7	0	6.3	**.421**	**.600**	.500	1.0	1.0	.1	.0	2.9
2024–25	Washington	22	**11**	**27.0**	.381	.247	.886	**2.4**	**3.1**	**.5**	**.1**	**9.1**
2025–26	Washington	**25**	0	8.6	.325	.280	.750	1.2	.9	.3	.0	2.8
2025–26	Dallas	23	0	10.4	.323	.156	**.893**	1.0	1.1	.2	**.1**	3.9
Career		77	11	14.2	.357	.245	.857	1.5	1.6	.3	.1	4.9

=== NBL ===
Year	Team	GP	GS	MPG	FG%	3P%	FT%	RPG	APG	SPG	BPG	PPG
2023–24	Illawarra	26	0	7.7	.367	.300	.538	1.3	.7	.2	.1	2.9
