= Justin Robinson (basketball, born 1997) =

American basketball player (born 1997)

- Robinson with FC Barcelona in 2026

No. 5 – FC Barcelona
- Position: Point guard
- League: Liga ACB; EuroLeague

Personal information
- Born: October 12, 1997 (age 29) Manassas, Virginia, U.S.
- Listed height: 6 ft 1 in (1.85 m)
- Listed weight: 185 lb (84 kg)

Career information
- High school: Montrose Christian School (Rockville, Maryland); St. James School (Hagerstown, Maryland)
- College: Virginia Tech (2015–2019)
- NBA draft: 2019: undrafted
- Playing career: 2019–present

Career history
- 2019–2020: Washington Wizards
- 2019–2020: →Capital City Go-Go
- 2020–2021: Delaware Blue Coats
- 2021: Oklahoma City Thunder
- 2021: Milwaukee Bucks
- 2021: →Wisconsin Herd
- 2021: Sacramento Kings
- 2021–2022: Detroit Pistons
- 2022–2024: Illawarra Hawks
- 2024: Breogán
- 2024–2025: Trapani Shark
- 2025–2026: Paris Basketball
- 2026–present: FC Barcelona

Career highlights
- All-Lega Serie A Team (2025); Second-team All-ACC (2018); First-team Parade All-American (2015)
- Stats at NBA.com
- Stats at Basketball Reference

Justin Robinson (born October 12, 1997) is an American professional basketball player for FC Barcelona of the Liga ACB and the EuroLeague. He played college basketball for the Virginia Tech Hokies.

== Early life ==
Robinson grew up in Manassas, Virginia. As a child, his family held season tickets for the Washington Wizards. He originally attended Montrose Christian School in Rockville, Maryland, playing basketball mostly as a reserve player and was a teammate of future NBA player Justin Anderson. He transferred to St. James School, Maryland before his junior year following the resignation of Montrose Christian's head coach, Stu Vetter. He immediately became a starter at St. James and averaged 13 points and six assists per game in his junior season. As a senior, Robinson averaged 21.8 points, 7.7 assists, 4.3 rebounds and 2.2 steals per game and was named the Washington County Player of the Year, Gatorade Maryland Boys Basketball Player of the Year, and a Parade All-American. He was rated a three-star recruit by ESPN, 247Sports and Rivals.com and committed to play college basketball at Virginia Tech over offers from UNLV and Providence.

== College career ==
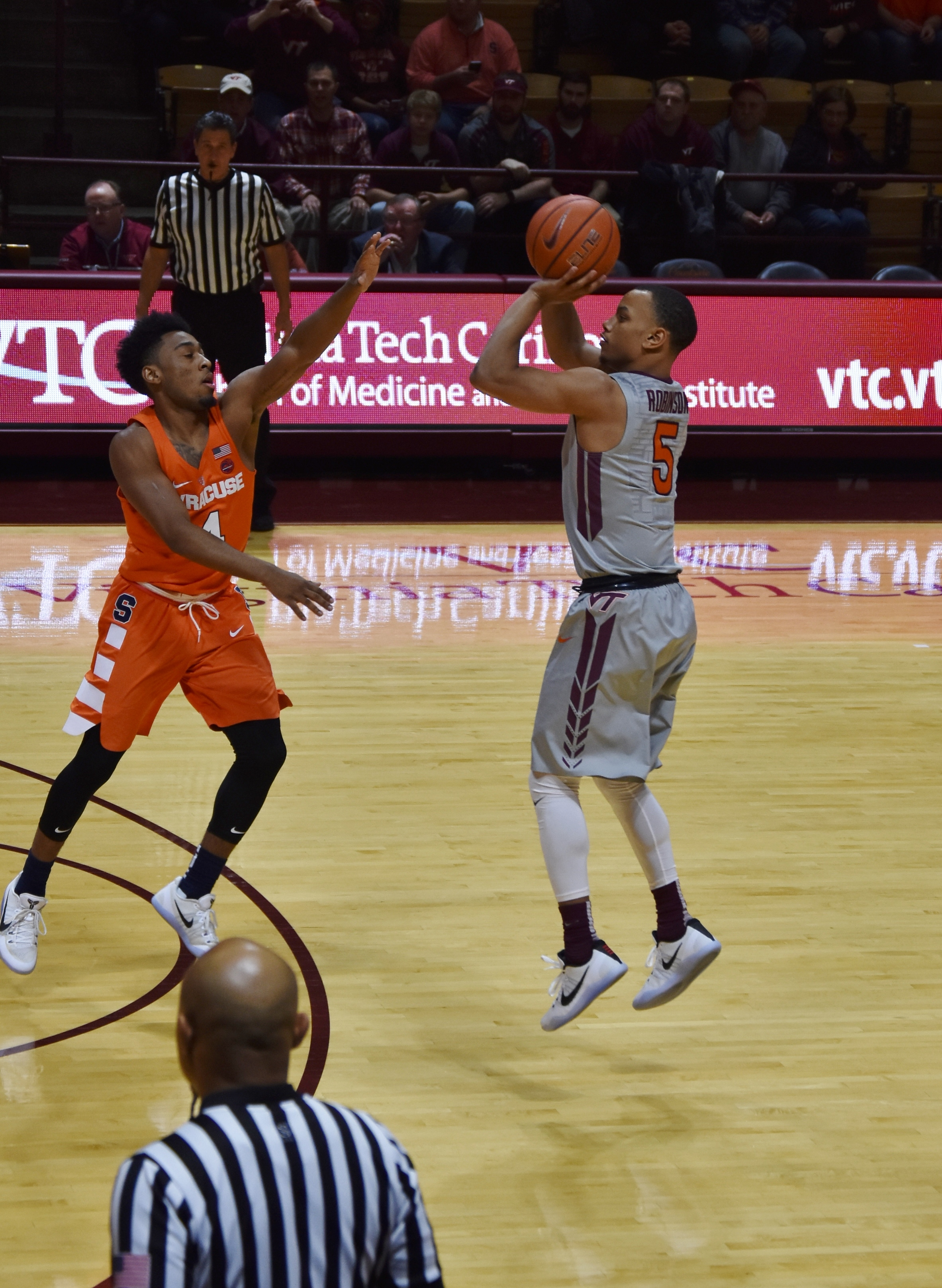
Robinson in 2017

Robinson played four seasons for the Virginia Tech Hokies. He entered the starting lineup during his freshman season, averaging 7.3 points and 2.8 assists per game in 35 games (19 starts). In his first full season as a sophomore, Robinson averaged 10.4 points, 4.9 rebounds and 3.2 assist per game. As a junior, Robinson averaged 14 points and 5.6 assists (tied for second in the conference) and was named second team All-Atlantic Coast Conference. He averaged 13.5 points, 5.0 assists, and 3.2 rebounds while shooting 41.8% from three in 24 games in his senior season, missing 12 games due to a foot injury. He was named the ACC Player of the Week on January 28, 2019, after scoring 35 points with eight assists in a 78–56 win over Syracuse. Robinson finished his career with 1,383 career points and a school-record 562 assists. He participated in the Portsmouth Invitational Tournament following his senior season, averaging 7.7 points and six assists in three games played.

== Professional career ==
=== Washington Wizards (2019–2020) ===
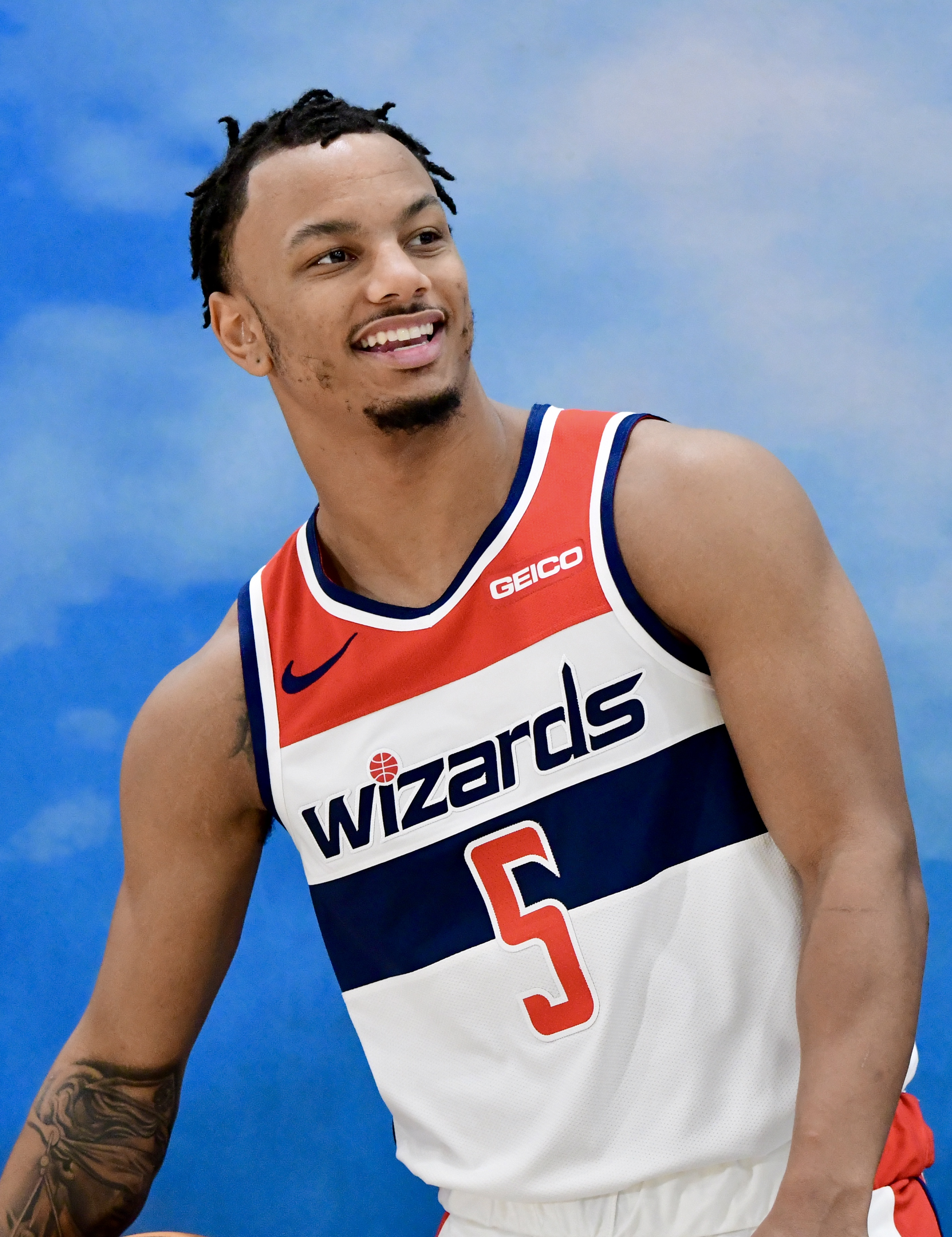
Robinson in 2019

After going undrafted in the 2019 NBA draft, Robinson agreed to a three-year contract as an undrafted free agent with the Washington Wizards and was named to the team's Summer League roster. He averaged 8.8 points 4.0 assists in five Summer League games, all starts. Robinson officially signed with the Wizards on July 12, 2019. On October 23, 2019, Robinson made his debut in NBA, coming off from bench in a 100–108 loss to the Dallas Mavericks. Robinson averaged 1.4 points per game in nine games. Robinson was waived by the Wizards on January 5, 2020.

=== Delaware Blue Coats (2020–2021) ===
On January 21, 2020, the Delaware Blue Coats announced that they had acquired Robinson off waivers. On February 21, Robinson tallied 22 points, four rebounds and three assists over 33 minutes in a loss to the Canton Charge. He missed a game against the Wisconsin Herd on February 28 with a shoulder injury.

On December 6, 2020, Robinson signed with the Philadelphia 76ers. On December 7, he was waived by the 76ers. Robinson later re-joined the Delaware Blue Coats in January 2021. In 13 games, he averaged 5.5 points, 3.4 rebounds, 5.9 assists and 1.62 steals in 31.1 minutes while shooting 40.5 percent from three point range, helping the Blue Coats reach the NBA G League Final.

=== Oklahoma City Thunder (2021) ===
On April 5, 2021, the Oklahoma City Thunder signed Robinson to a 10-day contract. On April 15, he signed a second 10-day contract.

=== Milwaukee Bucks (2021) ===
Robinson joined the Los Angeles Lakers for the 2021 NBA Summer League.

On September 15, 2021, Robinson signed with the Milwaukee Bucks, on a two-way contract with the Wisconsin Herd. However, he was waived on November 30, after appearing in 17 games.

=== Sacramento Kings (2021) ===
On December 17, 2021, Robinson signed a 10-day contract with the Sacramento Kings.

=== Detroit Pistons (2021–2022) ===
On December 28, 2021, Robinson signed a 10-day contract with the Detroit Pistons.

Robinson joined the Utah Jazz for the 2022 NBA Summer League.

=== Illawarra Hawks (2022–2024) ===
On August 10, 2022, Robinson signed with the Illawarra Hawks of the Australian National Basketball League for the 2022–23 season. He made his debut in the season opener but was then subsequently ruled out for the rest of the season after suffering a meniscus tear in his right knee.

On January 31, 2023, Robinson re-signed with the Hawks for the 2023–24 NBL season.

=== Breogán (2024) ===
On March 20, 2024, Robinson signed with CB Breogán of the Liga ACB.

=== Trapani Shark (2024–2025) ===
On July 22, 2024, Robinson signed with Trapani Shark of the Lega Basket Serie A. On December 9, Robinson extended his deal with the team until 2026.

=== Paris Basketball (2025–2026) ===
On July 24, 2025, Robinson signed with Paris Basketball of the LNB Pro A.

=== FC Barcelona (2026–present) ===
On July 13, 2026, Robinson signed with FC Barcelona of the Liga ACB and the EuroLeague on a two-season deal.

== Career statistics ==
Legend
GP	Games played	GS	Games started	MPG	Minutes per game
FG%	Field goal percentage	3P%	3-point field goal percentage	FT%	Free throw percentage
RPG	Rebounds per game	APG	Assists per game	SPG	Steals per game
BPG	Blocks per game	PPG	Points per game	**Bold**	Career high

=== NBA ===
==== Regular season ====
Year	Team	GP	GS	MPG	FG%	3P%	FT%	RPG	APG	SPG	BPG	PPG
2019–20	Washington	9	0	5.4	**.417**	**.600**	—	.6	.8	.0	.1	1.4
2020–21	Oklahoma City	9	0	9.8	.333	.286	.600	.8	1.0	**.3**	.0	2.3
2021–22	Milwaukee	17	0	11.6	.316	.270	**1.000**	.8	1.2	**.5**	.0	2.8
2021–22	Sacramento	3	0	5.0	.125	.000	–	.3	.7	.0	.0	.7
2021–22	Detroit	5	0	**18.2**	.321	.381	.333	**1.4**	**1.8**	.2	**.2**	**5.6**
Career		43	0	10.3	.317	.313	.538	.8	1.1	.3	.0	2.6

=== EuroLeague ===
Year	Team	GP	GS	MPG	FG%	3P%	FT%	RPG	APG	SPG	BPG	PPG	PIR
2025–26	Paris Basketball	36	15	19.0	.395	.338	.812	1.5	4.5	0.9	.1	14.6	14.4
Career		36	15	19.0	.395	.338	.812	1.5	4.5	0.9	.1	14.6	14.4

=== Domestic leagues ===
Year	Team	League	GP	MPG	FG%	3P%	FT%	RPG	APG	SPG	BPG	PPG
2019–20	(United States) Capital City Go-Go	G League	18	32.8	.463	.394	.643	3.6	5.8	1.6	.1	14.1
2019–20	(United States) Delaware Blue Coats	G League	15	29.2	.421	.292	.676	3.6	5.2	1.9	.0	14.2
2020–21	(United States) Delaware Blue Coats	G League	13	31.1	.389	.400	.629	3.3	6.0	1.7	.3	15.5
2022–23	(Australia) Illawarra Hawks	NBL	1	28.0	.250	.000	.000	5.0	8.0	1.0	1.0	10.0
2023–24	(Australia) Illawarra Hawks	NBL	33	27.0	.417	.317	.822	2.8	4.4	.9	.2	12.0
2023–24	(Spain) Rio Breogán	ACB	9	19.4	.394	.333	.750	1.9	2.4	.9	.0	9.3
2024–25	(Italy) Trapani Shark	LBA	35	26.2	.444	.392	.845	3.0	6.1	1.0	.1	14.5
2025–26	(France) Paris Basketball	LNB	35	19.8	.347	.292	.803	1.7	4.3	.9	.1	12.2

=== College ===
Year	Team	GP	GS	MPG	FG%	3P%	FT%	RPG	APG	SPG	BPG	PPG
2015–16	Virginia Tech	**35**	19	23.2	.420	.351	.730	1.8	2.8	.6	.1	7.3
2016–17	Virginia Tech	33	**33**	**31.5**	.413	.358	.769	3.0	4.8	.7	**.2**	10.4
2017–18	Virginia Tech	33	**33**	30.9	.464	.398	.782	2.8	**5.6**	1.2	.1	**14.0**
2018–19	Virginia Tech	24	20	29.5	**.473**	**.418**	**.811**	**3.2**	5.0	**1.6**	.1	13.5
Career		125	105	28.6	.445	.385	.773	2.7	4.5	1.0	.1	11.1

== Personal life ==
Robinson's father, Verdell Robinson, played college basketball at the University of Charleston and was the head coach of Manassas Park High School for seven years.
