= Junior Madut =

South Sudanese-Australian basketball player (born 1997)

No. 3 – US Laval
- Position: Shooting guard
- League: Nationale Masculine 1

Personal information
- Born: 26 March 1997 (age 29) Juba, Sudan (now South Sudan)
- Listed height: 198 cm (6 ft 6 in)
- Listed weight: 85 kg (187 lb)

Career information
- High school: Wyndham College (Sydney, New South Wales); DME Academy (Daytona, Florida)
- College: Eastern Florida SC (2017–2019); Hawaii (2020–2022)
- NBA draft: 2022: undrafted
- Playing career: 2022–present

Career history
- 2022–2023: South East Melbourne Phoenix
- 2023: Norths Bears
- 2023–2024: Tasmania JackJumpers
- 2024: Kauhajoen Karhu
- 2024–2025: Manchester Basketball
- 2025: Trepça
- 2025: South West Metro Pirates
- 2026: Dar City
- 2026: Rockhampton Rockets
- 2026–present: US Laval

Career highlights
- Kosovo Superleague champion (2025); Second-team All-Mid-Florida Conference (2019)

Junior Madut (born 26 March 1997), also sometimes referred to as Deng Junior Ring, is a South Sudanese-Australian professional basketball player for US Laval of the French Nationale Masculine 1. After two seasons of college basketball for the Hawaii Rainbow Warriors, he played a season and a half in the National Basketball League (NBL). He also plays for the South Sudan national team.

== Early life ==
Madut was born in Juba, South Sudan, and grew up in the Sydney suburb of Blacktown.

Madut attended Wyndham College in Sydney and then DME Academy in Daytona, Florida.

== College career ==
Between 2017 and 2019, Madut played college basketball for Eastern Florida State College. After redshirting the 2019–20 season, he played for the Hawaii Rainbow Warriors in the 2020–21 and 2021–22 seasons.

== Professional career ==
On 9 June 2022, Madut signed with the South East Melbourne Phoenix of the Australian National Basketball League. In 28 games during the 2022–23 NBL season, he averaged 3.96 points and 2.32 rebounds per game.

In February 2023, Madut joined the Norths Bears of the NBL1 East for the 2023 NBL1 season. On 15 April 2023, he scored 50 points in a 113–62 win over the Penrith Panthers.

On 2 May 2023, Madut signed a two-year deal with the Tasmania JackJumpers. On 5 January 2024, he was released by the JackJumpers.

On 21 January 2024, Madut signed with Kauhajoen Karhu of the Finnish Korisliiga.

On 25 September 2024, Madut signed with Manchester Basketball of the Super League Basketball for the 2024–25 season.

In February 2025, Madut left Manchester and signed with Trepça of the Kosovo Basketball Superleague.

Madut joined the South West Metro Pirates of the NBL1 North for the 2025 NBL1 season.

In March 2026, Madut joined Dar City BC of the Basketball Africa League. He then joined the Rockhampton Rockets for the 2026 NBL1 North season.

Madut joined US Laval of the French Nationale Masculine 1 for the 2026–27 season.

== National team career ==
In 2021, Madut debuted for the South Sudan national basketball team at AfroBasket 2021.

In August 2023, Madut was named in the South Sudan squad for the 2023 FIBA World Cup.
