= 2023–24 Cairns Taipans season =

- Head coach: (Australia) Adam Forde
- Captain: (United States) Tahjere McCall
- Arena: Cairns Convention Centre

NBL results
- Record: 12–16 (42.9%)
- Ladder: 8th
- Finals finish: Did not qualify
- Stats at NBL.com.au

Player records
- Points: (United States) Miller 5.3
- Rebounds: (New Zealand) Waardenburg 5.2
- Assists: (United States) Miller 5.7
- All statistics correct as of 18 February 2024.

The 2023–24 Cairns Taipans season was the 25th season of the franchise in the National Basketball League (NBL).

== Roster ==
Note: Flags indicate national team eligibility at FIBA-sanctioned events. Players may hold other non-FIBA nationalities not displayed.

2023–24 Cairns Taipans roster
Players
Coaches

Pos.	No.	Nat.	Name	Ht.	Wt.
G	0	(United States)	McCall, Tahjere (I & C)	1.96 m (6 ft 5 in)	86 kg (190 lb)
G	1	(United States)	Miller, Patrick (I)	1.85 m (6 ft 1 in)	91 kg (201 lb)
G	2	(Australia)	Armstrong, Taran	1.98 m (6 ft 6 in)	88 kg (194 lb)
F	3	(New Zealand)	Mennenga, Sam	2.06 m (6 ft 9 in)	109 kg (240 lb)
G	6	(Australia)	Antonio, Jonah (injured)	1.94 m (6 ft 4 in)	88 kg (194 lb)
F	7	(Australia)	Dennis, Kian (DP)	1.98 m (6 ft 6 in)	83 kg (183 lb)
F	11	(South Sudan)	Mayen, Lat	2.06 m (6 ft 9 in)	94 kg (207 lb)
F	13	(South Sudan)	Gak, Akoldah (injured)	2.10 m (6 ft 11 in)	102 kg (225 lb)
G	15	(Australia)	Mudronja, Alex (DP)	1.96 m (6 ft 5 in)	88 kg (194 lb)
F	21	(New Zealand)	Waardenburg, Sam	2.08 m (6 ft 10 in)	100 kg (220 lb)
F	23	(United States)	Roberts, Josh (I)	2.05 m (6 ft 9 in)	99 kg (218 lb)
F	24	(Australia)	Anderson, Lachlan	2.03 m (6 ft 8 in)	93 kg (205 lb)
F	34	(Sweden)	Klintman, Bobi (NS)	2.08 m (6 ft 10 in)	102 kg (225 lb)
F	42	(South Sudan)	Kuol, Bul (injured)	2.01 m (6 ft 7 in)	94 kg (207 lb)

Head coach

- (Australia) Adam Forde

Assistant coach(es)

- (Australia) Sam Gruggen
- (Australia) Kerry Williams

Legend

- (C) Team captain
- (DP) Development player
- (IN) Inactive
- (I) Import player
- (TP) Training player
- (SRP) Special restricted player
- (NS) Next Star player
- Injured

- Roster
Updated: 16 February 2024

=== Depth chart ===
Pos.	Starting 5	Bench 1	Development
PG	Taran Armstrong	Patrick Miller	Alex Mudronja
SG	Tahjere McCall	Jonah Antonio	Kian Dennis
SF	Bul Kuol	Lat Mayen	Lachlan Anderson
PF	Sam Waardenburg	Bobi Klintman
C	Sam Mennenga	Josh Roberts	Akoldah Gak

== Standings ==
=== Ladder ===
Pos	2023–24 NBL season											
Pos	Team	Pld	W	L	PCT	Last 5	Streak	Home	Away	PF	PA	PP
1	Melbourne United	28	20	8	71.43%	3–2	W1	11–3	9–5	2615	2454	106.56%
2	Perth Wildcats	28	17	11	60.71%	2–3	L2	10–4	7–7	2630	2563	102.61%
3	Tasmania JackJumpers	28	16	12	57.14%	4–1	W4	8–6	8–6	2564	2378	107.82%
4	Illawarra Hawks	28	14	14	50.00%	3–2	L1	8–6	6–8	2547	2518	101.15%
5	Sydney Kings	28	13	15	46.43%	2–3	W1	7–7	6–8	2672	2602	102.69%
6	New Zealand Breakers	28	13	15	46.43%	3–2	L1	8–6	5–9	2498	2480	100.73%
7	Brisbane Bullets	28	13	15	46.43%	2–3	L1	8–6	5–9	2458	2534	97.00%
8	Cairns Taipans	28	12	16	42.86%	1–4	W1	7–7	5–9	2506	2589	96.79%
9	Adelaide 36ers	28	12	16	42.86%	3–2	W1	9–5	3–11	2457	2563	95.86%
10	S.E. Melbourne Phoenix	28	10	18	35.71%	1–4	L4	7–7	3–11	2425	2691	90.12%

Updated to match(es) played on 18 February 2024. Source: NBL.com.au

The NBL tie-breaker system as outlined in the NBL Rules and Regulations states that in the case of an identical win–loss record, the overall points percentage will determine order of seeding.

=== Ladder progression ===
Leader and qualification to semifinals
Qualification to semifinals
Qualification to play-in games
Last place

2023–24 NBL season
Team ╲ Round	1	2	3	4	5	6	7	8	9	10	11	12	13	14	15	16	17	18	19	20
Adelaide 36ers	9	10	10	9	7	8	8	8	9	10	10	10	10	10	10	9	9	9	9	9
Brisbane Bullets	1	2	6	7	6	5	7	6	6	6	7	9	9	6	5	4	5	6	5	7
Cairns Taipans	8	6	3	4	3	7	6	7	7	7	6	6	7	9	7	6	7	8	8	8
Illawarra Hawks	10	8	9	10	9	10	10	10	10	8	8	8	8	5	6	8	6	4	4	4
Melbourne United	3	1	1	1	1	1	1	1	1	1	1	1	1	1	1	1	1	1	1	1
New Zealand Breakers	4	7	5	6	10	9	9	9	8	9	9	7	6	8	9	7	8	7	6	6
Perth Wildcats	6	5	8	8	8	6	5	4	3	5	3	2	2	2	2	2	2	2	2	2
S.E. Melbourne Phoenix	5	9	7	5	2	3	4	5	5	3	5	5	5	7	8	10	10	10	10	10
Sydney Kings	2	3	2	3	4	2	2	2	4	4	2	4	3	4	4	5	4	5	7	5
Tasmania JackJumpers	7	4	4	2	5	4	3	3	2	2	4	3	4	3	3	3	3	3	3	3

Updated to match(es) played on 18 February 2024. Source: NBL.com.au

== Game log ==
=== Pre-season ===
2023 NBL Blitz game log
Total: 1–2 (Home: 1–1; Road: 0–1)
September: 1–2 (Home: 1–1; Road: 0–1)

Game	Date	Team	Score	High points	High rebounds	High assists	Location Attendance	Record
1	17 September	Perth	L 95–102	Lat Mayen (17)	Taran Armstrong (8)	Taran Armstrong (7)	Gold Coast Convention Centre n/a	0–1
2	20 September	S.E. Melbourne	W 100–95	Patrick Miller (21)	Akoldah Gak (7)	Taran Armstrong (5)	Gold Coast Convention Centre n/a	1–1
3	22 September	@ Illawarra	L 108–90	Akoldah Gak (21)	Lat Mayen (9)	Taran Armstrong (7)	Gold Coast Convention Centre n/a	1–2

=== NBLxNBA games ===
2023 pre-season game log
Total: 0–2 (Home: 0–0; Road: 0–2)
October: 0–2 (Home: 0–0; Road: 0–2)

Game	Date	Team	Score	High points	High rebounds	High assists	Location Attendance	Record
1	10 October	@ Washington	L 82–145	Akoldah Gak (17)	Josh Roberts (10)	Taran Armstrong (8)	Capital One Arena; 6,856	0–1
2	15 October	@ Toronto	L 93–134	Patrick Miller (22)	Josh Roberts (9)	Elfrid Payton (7)	Scotiabank Arena; 18,141	0–2

=== Regular season ===
2023–24 game log
Total: 12–16 (Home: 7–7; Road: 5–9)
September: 0–1 (Home: 0–0; Road: 0–1)

Game	Date	Team	Score	High points	High rebounds	High assists	Location Attendance	Record
1	30 September	@ New Zealand	L 98–87	Sam Mennenga (17)	Lat Mayen (6)	Patrick Miller (6)	Spark Arena; 6,400	0–1

October: 3–1 (Home: 2–0; Road: 1–1)

Game	Date	Team	Score	High points	High rebounds	High assists	Location Attendance	Record
2	5 October	S.E. Melbourne	W 87–80	Patrick Miller (23)	Sam Waardenburg (14)	Patrick Miller (8)	Cairns Convention Centre; 3,906	1–1
3	7 October	@ Brisbane	W 86–89	Patrick Miller (21)	Sam Waardenburg (7)	Kuol, Miller (5)	Nissan Arena; 4,023	2–1
4	26 October	@ Illawarra	L 84–83	Patrick Miller (24)	Bobi Klintman (7)	Patrick Miller (7)	Wollongong Entertainment Centre; 1,923	2–2
5	28 October	Sydney	W 87–80	Bul Kuol (24)	Bobi Klintman (8)	three players (3)	Cairns Convention Centre; 4,587	3–2

November: 1–4 (Home: 1–1; Road: 0–3)

Game	Date	Team	Score	High points	High rebounds	High assists	Location Attendance	Record
6	3 November	@ New Zealand	L 91–81	Kuol, Mayen (18)	Mayen, Mennenga (7)	Mayen, Waardenburg (5)	Christchurch Arena; 4,909	3–3
7	5 November	@ S.E. Melbourne	L 91–78	three players (12)	Tahjere McCall (10)	Bul Kuol (4)	John Cain Arena; 7,511	3–4
8	11 November	Illawarra	W 81–71	Bul Kuol (19)	Gak, Mayen (8)	Taran Armstrong (4)	Cairns Convention Centre; 4,614	4–4
9	16 November	@ Perth	L 88–80	Tahjere McCall (19)	Taran Armstrong (6)	Patrick Miller (6)	Perth Arena; 9,976	4–5
10	18 November	Tasmania	L 87–90 (OT)	Patrick Miller (26)	Taran Armstrong (7)	three players (4)	Cairns Convention Centre; 4,194	4–6

December: 5–5 (Home: 2–4; Road: 3–1)

Game	Date	Team	Score	High points	High rebounds	High assists	Location Attendance	Record
11	1 December	Brisbane	L 79–84	Tahjere McCall (29)	Bul Kuol (6)	Patrick Miller (7)	Cairns Convention Centre; 4,007	4–7
12	3 December	@ Melbourne	W 103–115	Patrick Miller (32)	Josh Roberts (5)	Patrick Miller (10)	John Cain Arena; 9,384	5–7
13	7 December	Sydney	L 83–86	Patrick Miller (22)	Tahjere McCall (6)	Patrick Miller (7)	Cairns Convention Centre; 4,126	5–8
14	9 December	@ Adelaide	W 101–116	Patrick Miller (26)	Sam Waardenburg (9)	Tahjere McCall (15)	Adelaide Entertainment Centre; 8,954	6–8
15	15 December	New Zealand	L 82–111	Taran Armstrong (15)	Sam Waardenburg (6)	Patrick Miller (5)	Cairns Convention Centre; 3,584	6–9
16	17 December	@ Brisbane	W 101–102	Tahjere McCall (25)	Armstrong, Waardenburg (7)	Tahjere McCall (9)	Nissan Arena; 4,722	7–9
17	22 December	S.E. Melbourne	W 94–75	Sam Waardenburg (20)	Tahjere McCall (8)	Patrick Miller (9)	Cairns Convention Centre; 3,651	8–9
18	26 December	Perth	L 102–105	Bobi Klintman (24)	Sam Mennenga (10)	Patrick Miller (7)	Cairns Convention Centre; 4,050	8–10
19	29 December	@ Sydney	L 101–82	Patrick Miller (18)	Sam Waardenburg (8)	McCall, Miller (6)	Sydney SuperDome; 12,783	8–11
20	31 December	Melbourne	W 95–78	Patrick Miller (31)	Sam Mennenga (11)	Tahjere McCall (10)	Cairns Convention Centre; 4,802	9–11

January: 2–3 (Home: 1–1; Road: 1–2)

Game	Date	Team	Score	High points	High rebounds	High assists	Location Attendance	Record
21	6 January	@ Tasmania	L 103–86	Tahjere McCall (20)	Sam Mennenga (8)	Tahjere McCall (6)	Derwent Entertainment Centre; 4,340	9–12
22	13 January	Adelaide	W 111–101 (OT)	Tahjere McCall (30)	Akoldah Gak (14)	Tahjere McCall (9)	Cairns Convention Centre; 4,659	10–12
23	18 January	@ Illawarra	W 92–93	Tahjere McCall (28)	Akoldah Gak (11)	Armstrong, McCall (6)	Wollongong Entertainment Centre; 3,711	11–12
24	21 January	Brisbane	L 84–102	Bul Kuol (19)	Tahjere McCall (6)	Patrick Miller (5)	Cairns Convention Centre; 4,601	11–13
25	27 January	@ Adelaide	L 88–71	Lat Mayen (15)	Lat Mayen (9)	Tahjere McCall (7)	Adelaide Entertainment Centre; 9,741	11–14

February: 1–2 (Home: 1–1; Road: 0–1)

Game	Date	Team	Score	High points	High rebounds	High assists	Location Attendance	Record
26	1 February	Tasmania	L 86–94	Patrick Miller (31)	Patrick Miller (7)	Taran Armstrong (6)	Cairns Convention Centre; 3,645	11–15
27	10 February	@ Perth	L 117–88	Patrick Miller (25)	three players (4)	Patrick Miller (5)	Perth Arena; 12,895	11–16
28	16 February	Melbourne	W 97–88	Tahjere McCall (23)	Tahjere McCall (9)	Tahjere McCall (10)	Cairns Convention Centre; 4,378	12–16

2023–24 season schedule

== Transactions ==
=== Re-signed ===
Player	Date Signed	Contract	Ref.
Lat Mayen	27 March 2023	1-year deal	
Bul Kuol	9 June 2023	1-year deal	

=== Additions ===
Player	Date Signed	Contract	Former team	Ref.
Sam Mennenga	6 April 2023	2-year deal	Davidson Wildcats	
Akoldah Gak	10 April 2023	2-year deal	Illawarra Hawks	
Taran Armstrong	17 May 2023	2-year deal	California Baptist Lancers	
Bobi Klintman	13 June 2023	1-year deal (next star)	Wake Forest	
Patrick Miller	16 June 2023	1-year deal	Brose Bamberg	
Lachlan Anderson	8 July 2023	2-year deal (club option)	TFT Skopje	
Josh Roberts	4 August 2023	1-year deal	Manhattan Jaspers	
Kian Dennis	8 August 2023	2-year deal (club option)	Southern Districts Spartans	
Alex Mudronja	8 August 2023	2-year deal (club option)	Illawarra Hawks	

=== Subtractions ===
Player	Reason left	Date Left	New Team	Ref.
Mirko Đerić	Mutual release	27 March 2023	TBC	
Keanu Pinder	Free agent	1 April 2023	Perth Wildcats	
Shannon Scott	Free agent	28 April 2023	Brisbane Bullets	
Ben Ayre	Club option declined	2 May 2023	S.E. Melbourne Phoenix	
D. J. Hogg	Free agent	26 May 2023	Sydney Kings	
Majok Deng	Declined player option	28 June 2023	Tasmania JackJumpers	
Gabe Hadley	Free agent	18 July 2023	Brisbane Bullets	

== Awards ==
=== Club awards ===
- Club MVP: Patrick Miller
- Defensive Player: Tahjere McCall
- Players’ Player: Patrick Miller
- Commitment to Community: Alex Mudronja
- Members’ Choice MVP: Bobi Klintman
- Coaches Award: Lat Mayen

== See also ==
- 2023–24 NBL season
