= 2023–24 Brisbane Bullets season =

Australian basketball club season

- Head coach: (Australia) Justin Schueller
- Captain: (Australia) Nathan Sobey
- Arena: Nissan Arena

NBL results
- Record: 13–15 (46.4%)
- Ladder: 7th
- Finals finish: Did not qualify
- Stats at NBL.com.au

Player records
- Points: (Australia) Sobey 20.1
- Rebounds: (Australia) Bannan 7.2
- Assists: (United States) Scott 3.3
- All statistics correct as of 18 February 2024.

The 2023–24 Brisbane Bullets season was the 38th season of the franchise in the National Basketball League (NBL), and their first under the leadership of their new head coach Justin Schueller.

== Roster ==
Note: Flags indicate national team eligibility at FIBA-sanctioned events. Players may hold other non-FIBA nationalities not displayed.

2023–24 Brisbane Bullets roster
Players
Coaches

Pos.	No.	Nat.	Name	Ht.	Wt.
F	0	(Australia)	Mitchell, D. J. (injured)	2.03 m (6 ft 8 in)	106 kg (234 lb)
G	2	(Australia)	White, Isaac	1.88 m (6 ft 2 in)	85 kg (187 lb)
G	3	(United States)	Scott, Shannon (I)	1.87 m (6 ft 2 in)	88 kg (194 lb)
G	4	(Australia)	Hadley, Gabe	1.93 m (6 ft 4 in)	91 kg (201 lb)
G	6	(Australia)	Devers, Tristan (DP)	1.91 m (6 ft 3 in)
G	8	(Australia)	Norton, Mitch	1.84 m (6 ft 0 in)	90 kg (198 lb)
C	11	(Australia)	Zikarsky, Rocco (NS)	2.20 m (7 ft 3 in)	103 kg (227 lb)
C	12	(Australia)	Baynes, Aron	2.08 m (6 ft 10 in)	118 kg (260 lb)
F	13	(Australia)	Bannan, Josh	2.08 m (6 ft 10 in)	100 kg (220 lb)
G	20	(Australia)	Sobey, Nathan (C)	1.90 m (6 ft 3 in)	82 kg (181 lb)
G/F	23	(United States)	Prather, Casey (I)	1.98 m (6 ft 6 in)	96 kg (212 lb)
C	24	(New Zealand)	Harrison, Tyrell	2.14 m (7 ft 0 in)	115 kg (254 lb)
G	26	(Australia)	McDaniel, Sam	1.98 m (6 ft 6 in)	102 kg (225 lb)
F	32	(Australia)	Johns, Matt (DP)	2.03 m (6 ft 8 in)	103 kg (227 lb)
G/F	34	(United States)	Smith, Chris (I)	1.93 m (6 ft 4 in)	95 kg (209 lb)

Head coach

- (Australia) Justin Schueller

Assistant coach(es)

- (Australia) Darryl McDonald
- (Australia) Greg Vanderjagt

Strength & conditioning coach(es)

- (Australia) Matt Hardiman

Legend

- (C) Team captain
- (DP) Development player
- (IN) Inactive
- (I) Import player
- (TP) Training player
- (SRP) Special restricted player
- (NS) Next Star player
- Injured

- Roster
Updated: 3 February 2024

=== Depth chart ===
Pos.	Starting 5	Bench 1	Development
PG	Shannon Scott	Mitch Norton	Tristan Devers
SG	Nathan Sobey	Isaac White	Gabe Hadley
SF	Casey Prather	Chris Smith	Sam McDaniel
PF	Josh Bannan	D. J. Mitchell	Matt Johns
C	Aron Baynes	Tyrell Harrison	Rocco Zikarsky

== Standings ==
=== Ladder ===
Pos	2023–24 NBL season											
Pos	Team	Pld	W	L	PCT	Last 5	Streak	Home	Away	PF	PA	PP
1	Melbourne United	28	20	8	71.43%	3–2	W1	11–3	9–5	2615	2454	106.56%
2	Perth Wildcats	28	17	11	60.71%	2–3	L2	10–4	7–7	2630	2563	102.61%
3	Tasmania JackJumpers	28	16	12	57.14%	4–1	W4	8–6	8–6	2564	2378	107.82%
4	Illawarra Hawks	28	14	14	50.00%	3–2	L1	8–6	6–8	2547	2518	101.15%
5	Sydney Kings	28	13	15	46.43%	2–3	W1	7–7	6–8	2672	2602	102.69%
6	New Zealand Breakers	28	13	15	46.43%	3–2	L1	8–6	5–9	2498	2480	100.73%
7	Brisbane Bullets	28	13	15	46.43%	2–3	L1	8–6	5–9	2458	2534	97.00%
8	Cairns Taipans	28	12	16	42.86%	1–4	W1	7–7	5–9	2506	2589	96.79%
9	Adelaide 36ers	28	12	16	42.86%	3–2	W1	9–5	3–11	2457	2563	95.86%
10	S.E. Melbourne Phoenix	28	10	18	35.71%	1–4	L4	7–7	3–11	2425	2691	90.12%

Updated to match(es) played on 18 February 2024. Source: NBL.com.au

The NBL tie-breaker system as outlined in the NBL Rules and Regulations states that in the case of an identical win–loss record, the overall points percentage will determine order of seeding.

=== Ladder progression ===
Leader and qualification to semifinals
Qualification to semifinals
Qualification to play-in games
Last place

2023–24 NBL season
Team ╲ Round	1	2	3	4	5	6	7	8	9	10	11	12	13	14	15	16	17	18	19	20
Adelaide 36ers	9	10	10	9	7	8	8	8	9	10	10	10	10	10	10	9	9	9	9	9
Brisbane Bullets	1	2	6	7	6	5	7	6	6	6	7	9	9	6	5	4	5	6	5	7
Cairns Taipans	8	6	3	4	3	7	6	7	7	7	6	6	7	9	7	6	7	8	8	8
Illawarra Hawks	10	8	9	10	9	10	10	10	10	8	8	8	8	5	6	8	6	4	4	4
Melbourne United	3	1	1	1	1	1	1	1	1	1	1	1	1	1	1	1	1	1	1	1
New Zealand Breakers	4	7	5	6	10	9	9	9	8	9	9	7	6	8	9	7	8	7	6	6
Perth Wildcats	6	5	8	8	8	6	5	4	3	5	3	2	2	2	2	2	2	2	2	2
S.E. Melbourne Phoenix	5	9	7	5	2	3	4	5	5	3	5	5	5	7	8	10	10	10	10	10
Sydney Kings	2	3	2	3	4	2	2	2	4	4	2	4	3	4	4	5	4	5	7	5
Tasmania JackJumpers	7	4	4	2	5	4	3	3	2	2	4	3	4	3	3	3	3	3	3	3

Updated to match(es) played on 18 February 2024. Source: NBL.com.au

== Game log ==
=== Pre-season ===
2023 NBL Blitz game log
Total: 1–2 (Home: 0–2; Road: 1–0)
September: 1–2 (Home: 0–2; Road: 1–0)

Game	Date	Team	Score	High points	High rebounds	High assists	Location Attendance	Record
1	16 September	Melbourne	L 92–96	Chris Smith (21)	Josh Bannan (10)	Shannon Scott (6)	Gold Coast Convention Centre n/a	0–1
2	20 September	Illawarra	L 88–95	Aron Baynes (20)	Aron Baynes (20)	Nathan Sobey (6)	Gold Coast Convention Centre n/a	0–2
3	22 September	@ Sydney	W 76–105	Sam McDaniel (21)	Tyrell Harrison (8)	Mitch Norton (6)	Gold Coast Convention Centre n/a	1–2

=== Regular season ===
2023–24 game log
Total: 13–15 (Home: 8–6; Road: 5–9)
September: 1–0 (Home: 1–0; Road: 0–0)

Game	Date	Team	Score	High points	High rebounds	High assists	Location Attendance	Record
1	29 September	Adelaide	W 86–71	Nathan Sobey (18)	Aron Baynes (13)	Shannon Scott (7)	Nissan Arena; 4,286	1–0

October: 3–4 (Home: 1–2; Road: 2–2)

Game	Date	Team	Score	High points	High rebounds	High assists	Location Attendance	Record
2	5 October	@ New Zealand	W 84–89	Nathan Sobey (24)	Harrison, Sobey (8)	Mitch Norton (6)	Spark Arena; 6,280	2–0
3	7 October	Cairns	L 86–89	Nathan Sobey (31)	Sam McDaniel (8)	Shannon Scott (7)	Nissan Arena; 4,023	2–1
4	13 October	Sydney	L 102–113	Nathan Sobey (26)	Nathan Sobey (7)	Shannon Scott (11)	Nissan Arena; 3,713	2–2
5	15 October	@ Melbourne	L 89–78	Shannon Scott (19)	Tyrell Harrison (8)	Nathan Sobey (5)	John Cain Arena; 9,327	2–3
6	21 October	@ S.E. Melbourne	L 96–73	Sobey, White (14)	Harrison, Sobey (7)	Mitch Norton (5)	John Cain Arena; 5,552	2–4
7	27 October	@ Perth	W 79–84	Nathan Sobey (17)	Sam McDaniel (8)	Isaac White (4)	Perth Arena; 10,481	3–4
8	29 October	Tasmania	W 90–87	Nathan Sobey (28)	Josh Bannan (10)	Mitch Norton (4)	Nissan Arena; 4,559	4–4

November: 1–3 (Home: 1–1; Road: 0–2)

Game	Date	Team	Score	High points	High rebounds	High assists	Location Attendance	Record
9	2 November	S.E. Melbourne	W 108–92	Josh Bannan (17)	Josh Bannan (11)	Mitch Norton (9)	Nissan Arena; 2,834	5–4
10	4 November	@ Tasmania	L 87–85	Tyrell Harrison (20)	Bannan, Harrison (8)	Bannan, Norton (3)	Silverdome; 3,255	5–5
11	12 November	@ Sydney	L 104–95	Nathan Sobey (17)	Josh Bannan (5)	Nathan Sobey (5)	Sydney SuperDome; 10,235	5–6
12	18 November	Perth	L 76–79	Chris Smith (23)	Bannan, White (6)	Mitch Norton (4)	Nissan Arena; 4,869	5–7

December: 3–4 (Home: 2–2; Road: 1–2)

Game	Date	Team	Score	High points	High rebounds	High assists	Location Attendance	Record
13	1 December	@ Cairns	W 79–84	Chris Smith (17)	Josh Bannan (8)	three players (3)	Cairns Convention Centre; 4,007	6–7
14	3 December	Illawarra	W 78–77	Chris Smith (16)	Tyrell Harrison (8)	Nathan Sobey (6)	Nissan Arena; 3,572	7–7
15	10 December	@ Melbourne	L 103–68	McDaniel, Sobey (12)	D. J. Mitchell (9)	Shannon Scott (3)	John Cain Arena; 9,635	7–8
16	17 December	Cairns	L 101–102	Nathan Sobey (24)	Josh Bannan (10)	Sam McDaniel (3)	Nissan Arena; 4,722	7–9
17	24 December	@ Adelaide	L 95–88	Nathan Sobey (36)	Josh Bannan (10)	Norton, Sobey (2)	Adelaide Entertainment Centre; 9,440	7–10
18	27 December	New Zealand	L 71–81	Nathan Sobey (16)	Chris Smith (12)	Chris Smith (4)	Nissan Arena; 4,796	7–11
19	30 December	S.E. Melbourne	W 95–83	Nathan Sobey (35)	Tyrell Harrison (8)	Shannon Scott (7)	Nissan Arena; 4,208	8–11

January: 4–2 (Home: 2–1; Road: 2–1)

Game	Date	Team	Score	High points	High rebounds	High assists	Location Attendance	Record
20	7 January	@ Sydney	W 93–101	Nathan Sobey (27)	Josh Bannan (9)	Mitch Norton (5)	Sydney SuperDome; 13,078	9–11
21	10 January	Tasmania	W 80–77	Chris Smith (19)	three players (7)	Shannon Scott (5)	Nissan Arena; 4,486	10–11
22	14 January	Illawarra	W 110–103	Nathan Sobey (25)	Tyrell Harrison (7)	Shannon Scott (6)	Nissan Arena; 5,200	11–11
23	19 January	@ Perth	L 118–86	Tyrell Harrison (16)	Tyrell Harrison (9)	Shannon Scott (4)	Perth Arena; 12,836	11–12
24	21 January	@ Cairns	W 84–102	Nathan Sobey (18)	Tyrell Harrison (13)	Nathan Sobey (5)	Cairns Convention Centre; 4,601	12–12
25	26 January	Melbourne	L 77–93	Nathan Sobey (19)	Tyrell Harrison (8)	Prather, Sobey (3)	Nissan Arena; 5,291	12–13

February: 1–2 (Home: 1–0; Road: 0–2)

Game	Date	Team	Score	High points	High rebounds	High assists	Location Attendance	Record
26	3 February	@ Illawarra	L 89–76	three players (11)	Bannan, Harrison (8)	six players (2)	Wollongong Entertainment Centre; 4,991	12–14
27	9 February	Adelaide	W 102–84	Nathan Sobey (37)	Josh Bannan (11)	Mitch Norton (6)	Nissan Arena; 4,987	13–14
28	16 February	@ New Zealand	L 103–87	Josh Bannan (29)	Tyrell Harrison (6)	Nathan Sobey (6)	Spark Arena; 6,085	13–15

2023–24 season schedule

== Transactions ==
=== Re-signed ===
Player	Date Signed	Contract	Ref.
D. J. Mitchell	24 February 2023	1-year deal	
Tyrell Harrison	7 March 2023	2-year deal (club option)	
Matt Johns	25 July 2023	1-year deal	

=== Additions ===
Player	Date Signed	Contract	Former team	Ref.
Isaac White	31 March 2023	2-year deal	Tasmania JackJumpers	
Sam McDaniel	31 March 2023	2-year deal	Tasmania JackJumpers	
Josh Bannan	6 April 2023	3-year deal	Montana Grizzlies	
Mitch Norton	19 April 2023	2-year deal	Perth Wildcats	
Shannon Scott	28 April 2023	2-year deal	Cairns Taipans	
Rocco Zikarsky	7 July 2023	2-year deal (next star)	Centre of Excellence	
Chris Smith	15 July 2023	2-year deal (club option)	Chiba Jets	
Gabe Hadley	18 July 2023	1-year deal	Cairns Taipans	
Tristan Devers	9 August 2023	1-year deal	Nunawading Spectres	
Casey Prather	21 December 2023	2-year deal (club option)	Hapoel Eilat	

=== Subtractions ===
Player	Reason left	Date Left	New Team	Ref.
Andrew White	Free agent	27 February 2023	Northside Wizards	
Lual Diing	Club option declined	24 March 2023	Northside Wizards	
Jason Cadee	Free agent	6 April 2023	Adelaide 36ers	
Gorjok Gak	Free agent	10 April 2023	S.E. Melbourne Phoenix	
Rasmus Bach	Retired	15 June 2023	n/a	
Kody Stattmann	Free agent	28 July 2023	S.E. Melbourne Phoenix	

== Awards ==
=== Club awards ===
- Club MVP: Nathan Sobey
- Players Player: Mitch Norton
- Members Moment of the Year: Chris Smith
- Defensive Player of the Year: Sam McDaniel
- Youth Player of the Year: Josh Bannan
- Narelle Kelly Award: Andrew Ciurleo
- Volunteer of the Year: Adrian Addicott

== See also ==
- 2023–24 NBL season
- Brisbane Bullets
