= 2023–24 Sydney Kings season =

Australian basketball club season

- Head coach: (Palestine) Mahmoud Abdelfattah
- Captain: (Australia) Shaun Bruce
- Arena: Sydney SuperDome

NBL results
- Record: 13–15 (46.4%)
- Ladder: 5th
- Finals finish: Play-in finalist (lost to Breakers 76–83)
- Stats at NBL.com.au

Player records
- Points: (United States) Adams 19.5
- Rebounds: (Australia) Hunter 7.0
- Assists: (United States) Adams 5.3
- All statistics correct as of 28 February 2024.

The 2023–24 Sydney Kings season was the 35th season of the franchise in the National Basketball League (NBL).

On 16 May 2023, head coach Chase Buford parted ways with the Kings. On 21 June 2023, the Kings hired Mahmoud Abdelfattah on a two-year deal as head coach.

== Roster ==
Note: Flags indicate national team eligibility at FIBA-sanctioned events. Players may hold other non-FIBA nationalities not displayed.

2023–24 Sydney Kings roster
Players
Coaches

Pos.	No.	Nat.	Name	Ht.	Wt.
C	1	(Australia)	Hunter, Jordan	2.09 m (6 ft 10 in)	109 kg (240 lb)
G	2	(United States)	Adams, Jaylen (I)	1.83 m (6 ft 0 in)	84 kg (185 lb)
F	3	(United States)	Hogg, D. J. (I)	2.07 m (6 ft 9 in)	108 kg (238 lb)
G	4	(Australia)	Rentoy, Jasper (DP)	1.80 m (5 ft 11 in)
G	5	(Australia)	Glover, Angus	1.94 m (6 ft 4 in)	90 kg (198 lb)
F	6	(Australia)	Galloway, Jaylin	1.97 m (6 ft 6 in)	92 kg (203 lb)
G	7	(Australia)	Bruce, Shaun (C)	1.92 m (6 ft 4 in)	87 kg (192 lb)
G	9	(South Sudan)	Makoi, Jackson (DP)	1.96 m (6 ft 5 in)	89 kg (196 lb)
G/F	11	(Australia)	Amir, Klairus (DP)	2.00 m (6 ft 7 in)	80 kg (176 lb)
F	15	(South Sudan)	Maluach, Makuach (injured)	1.96 m (6 ft 5 in)	89 kg (196 lb)
F	21	(South Sudan)	Noi, Kouat	2.01 m (6 ft 7 in)	103 kg (227 lb)
F	22	(Australia)	Toohey, Alex (NS)	2.01 m (6 ft 7 in)	103 kg (227 lb)
F	25	(Australia)	Gattorna, Isaac (DP)	1.99 m (6 ft 6 in)	98 kg (216 lb)
F/C	33	(New Zealand)	Timmins, Sam	2.11 m (6 ft 11 in)	119 kg (262 lb)
F	43	(Australia)	Bolden, Jonah	2.03 m (6 ft 8 in)	106 kg (234 lb)
G/F	45	(United States)	Valentine, Denzel (I)	1.93 m (6 ft 4 in)	96 kg (212 lb)

Head coach

- (Palestine) Mahmoud Abdelfattah

Assistant coach(es)

- (Australia) Fleur McIntyre
- (United States) Kane Martinez
- (Australia) Daniel Kickert

Legend

- (C) Team captain
- (DP) Development player
- (IN) Inactive
- (I) Import player
- (SRP) Special restricted player
- (NS) Next Star player
- Injured

- Roster
Updated: 27 February 2024

=== Depth chart ===
Pos.	Starting 5	Bench 1	Development
PG	Jaylen Adams	Shaun Bruce	Jackson Makoi
SG	Denzel Valentine	Angus Glover	Klairus Amir
SF	Jaylin Galloway	Alex Toohey	Makuach Maluach
PF	D. J. Hogg	Kouat Noi	Isaac Gattorna
C	Jonah Bolden	Jordan Hunter	Sam Timmins

== Standings ==
=== Ladder ===
Pos	2023–24 NBL season											
Pos	Team	Pld	W	L	PCT	Last 5	Streak	Home	Away	PF	PA	PP
1	Melbourne United	28	20	8	71.43%	3–2	W1	11–3	9–5	2615	2454	106.56%
2	Perth Wildcats	28	17	11	60.71%	2–3	L2	10–4	7–7	2630	2563	102.61%
3	Tasmania JackJumpers	28	16	12	57.14%	4–1	W4	8–6	8–6	2564	2378	107.82%
4	Illawarra Hawks	28	14	14	50.00%	3–2	L1	8–6	6–8	2547	2518	101.15%
5	Sydney Kings	28	13	15	46.43%	2–3	W1	7–7	6–8	2672	2602	102.69%
6	New Zealand Breakers	28	13	15	46.43%	3–2	L1	8–6	5–9	2498	2480	100.73%
7	Brisbane Bullets	28	13	15	46.43%	2–3	L1	8–6	5–9	2458	2534	97.00%
8	Cairns Taipans	28	12	16	42.86%	1–4	W1	7–7	5–9	2506	2589	96.79%
9	Adelaide 36ers	28	12	16	42.86%	3–2	W1	9–5	3–11	2457	2563	95.86%
10	S.E. Melbourne Phoenix	28	10	18	35.71%	1–4	L4	7–7	3–11	2425	2691	90.12%

Updated to match(es) played on 18 February 2024. Source: NBL.com.au

The NBL tie-breaker system as outlined in the NBL Rules and Regulations states that in the case of an identical win–loss record, the overall points percentage will determine order of seeding.

=== Ladder progression ===
Leader and qualification to semifinals
Qualification to semifinals
Qualification to play-in games
Last place

2023–24 NBL season
Team ╲ Round	1	2	3	4	5	6	7	8	9	10	11	12	13	14	15	16	17	18	19	20
Adelaide 36ers	9	10	10	9	7	8	8	8	9	10	10	10	10	10	10	9	9	9	9	9
Brisbane Bullets	1	2	6	7	6	5	7	6	6	6	7	9	9	6	5	4	5	6	5	7
Cairns Taipans	8	6	3	4	3	7	6	7	7	7	6	6	7	9	7	6	7	8	8	8
Illawarra Hawks	10	8	9	10	9	10	10	10	10	8	8	8	8	5	6	8	6	4	4	4
Melbourne United	3	1	1	1	1	1	1	1	1	1	1	1	1	1	1	1	1	1	1	1
New Zealand Breakers	4	7	5	6	10	9	9	9	8	9	9	7	6	8	9	7	8	7	6	6
Perth Wildcats	6	5	8	8	8	6	5	4	3	5	3	2	2	2	2	2	2	2	2	2
S.E. Melbourne Phoenix	5	9	7	5	2	3	4	5	5	3	5	5	5	7	8	10	10	10	10	10
Sydney Kings	2	3	2	3	4	2	2	2	4	4	2	4	3	4	4	5	4	5	7	5
Tasmania JackJumpers	7	4	4	2	5	4	3	3	2	2	4	3	4	3	3	3	3	3	3	3

Updated to match(es) played on 18 February 2024. Source: NBL.com.au

== Game log ==
=== Pre-season ===
2023 NBL Blitz game log
Total: 0–3 (Home: 0–2; Road: 0–1)
September: 0–3 (Home: 0–2; Road: 0–1)

Game	Date	Team	Score	High points	High rebounds	High assists	Location Attendance	Record
1	18 September	S.E. Melbourne	L 86–93	Jaylin Galloway (18)	Denzel Valentine (11)	Shaun Bruce (5)	Gold Coast Convention Centre n/a	0–1
2	20 September	@ Melbourne	L 105–87	Alex Toohey (19)	Jordan Hunter (8)	Jaylin Adams (5)	Gold Coast Convention Centre n/a	0–2
3	22 September	Brisbane	L 76–105	Denzel Valentine (12)	Alex Toohey (5)	Shaun Bruce (5)	Gold Coast Convention Centre n/a	0–3

=== Regular season ===
2023–24 game log
Total: 13–15 (Home: 7–7; Road: 6–8)
September: 1–0 (Home: 0–0; Road: 1–0)

Game	Date	Team	Score	High points	High rebounds	High assists	Location Attendance	Record
1	30 September	@ Illawarra	W 81–96	Kouat Noi (23)	Hunter, Valentine (7)	Denzel Valentine (10)	Wollongong Entertainment Centre; 4,322	1–0

October: 3–3 (Home: 2–1; Road: 1–2)

Game	Date	Team	Score	High points	High rebounds	High assists	Location Attendance	Record
2	6 October	@ Tasmania	L 80–72	Jaylen Adams (21)	Alex Toohey (9)	Adams, Valentine (4)	Derwent Entertainment Centre; 4,340	1–1
3	8 October	Adelaide	W 109–100	Jordan Hunter (22)	Jordan Hunter (8)	Jaylen Adams (8)	Sydney SuperDome; 14,029	2–1
4	13 October	@ Brisbane	W 102–113	Jaylen Adams (26)	Jonah Bolden (12)	Denzel Valentine (6)	Nissan Arena; 3,713	3–1
5	15 October	Perth	W 99–86	Jordan Hunter (20)	Jonah Bolden (15)	Jaylen Adams (6)	Sydney SuperDome; 10,546	4–1
6	22 October	Tasmania	L 95–105	Jaylen Adams (21)	Jaylen Adams (10)	Denzel Valentine (6)	Sydney SuperDome; 10,721	4–2
7	28 October	@ Cairns	L 87–80	Kouat Noi (18)	Jaylen Adams (8)	four players (2)	Cairns Convention Centre; 4,587	4–3

November: 3–1 (Home: 2–0; Road: 1–1)

Game	Date	Team	Score	High points	High rebounds	High assists	Location Attendance	Record
8	3 November	@ Illawarra	W 83–103	Adams, Maluach (16)	Bolden, Hunter (9)	Jaylen Adams (7)	Wollongong Entertainment Centre; 3,934	5–3
9	5 November	New Zealand	W 87–85	D. J. Hogg (18)	D. J. Hogg (7)	Jaylen Adams (9)	Sydney SuperDome; 12,143	6–3
10	12 November	Brisbane	W 104–95	Jaylen Adams (24)	Jonah Bolden (9)	Adams, Hunter (4)	Sydney SuperDome; 10,235	7–3
11	19 November	@ Melbourne	L 105–93	D. J. Hogg (20)	Jonah Bolden (12)	Denzel Valentine (7)	John Cain Arena; 10,175	7–4

December: 3–4 (Home: 1–2; Road: 2–2)

Game	Date	Team	Score	High points	High rebounds	High assists	Location Attendance	Record
12	1 December	@ Perth	L 114–105	Jonah Bolden (28)	Denzel Valentine (9)	Jaylen Adams (8)	Perth Arena; 11,897	7–5
13	7 December	@ Cairns	W 83–86	Jaylen Adams (24)	Jordan Hunter (10)	Jaylen Adams (7)	Cairns Convention Centre; 4,126	8–5
14	10 December	S.E. Melbourne	L 94–104	Jaylen Adams (19)	Jonah Bolden (15)	three players (3)	Sydney SuperDome; 13,197	8–6
15	17 December	@ Tasmania	W 84–90	Jaylin Galloway (22)	Denzel Valentine (7)	Jaylen Adams (10)	Derwent Entertainment Centre; 4,340	9–6
16	22 December	@ New Zealand	L 109–101	Kouat Noi (19)	Alex Toohey (7)	D. J. Hogg (8)	Spark Arena; 5,228	9–7
17	25 December	Illawarra	L 90–94	Jaylen Adams (22)	Jordan Hunter (8)	Jaylen Adams (5)	Sydney SuperDome; 8,578	9–8
18	29 December	Cairns	W 101–82	Denzel Valentine (29)	Jordan Hunter (16)	D. J. Hogg (5)	Sydney SuperDome; 12,783	10–8

January: 2–5 (Home: 2–3; Road: 0–2)

Game	Date	Team	Score	High points	High rebounds	High assists	Location Attendance	Record
19	4 January	Melbourne	L 85–101	Shaun Bruce (16)	Jordan Hunter (9)	Denzel Valentine (8)	Sydney SuperDome; 12,898	10–9
20	7 January	Brisbane	L 93–101	Jaylen Adams (21)	Jordan Hunter (10)	Jaylen Adams (8)	Sydney SuperDome; 13,078	10–10
21	11 January	@ Adelaide	L 95–82	Jaylen Adams (20)	Jordan Hunter (9)	Jaylen Adams (4)	Adelaide Entertainment Centre; 9,580	10–11
22	14 January	New Zealand	W 105–76	Jaylen Adams (39)	Jordan Hunter (10)	Denzel Valentine (5)	Sydney SuperDome; 16,605	11–11
23	21 January	Perth	L 98–104	Jaylen Adams (29)	Hunter, Noi (12)	Denzel Valentine (8)	Sydney SuperDome; 13,138	11–12
24	25 January	@ S.E. Melbourne	L 104–98	Jaylen Adams (24)	Galloway, Valentine (5)	Jaylen Adams (9)	State Basketball Centre; 3,422	11–13
25	28 January	Melbourne	W 98–86	Makuach Maluach (18)	Jordan Hunter (9)	Denzel Valentine (9)	Sydney SuperDome; 12,921	12–13

February: 1–2 (Home: 0–1; Road: 1–1)

Game	Date	Team	Score	High points	High rebounds	High assists	Location Attendance	Record
26	2 February	@ Adelaide	L 85–78	Jaylen Adams (21)	Denzel Valentine (9)	Adams, Valentine (5)	Adelaide Entertainment Centre; 9,434	12–14
27	11 February	Illawarra	L 95–106	Denzel Valentine (21)	D. J. Hogg (8)	Jaylen Adams (7)	Sydney SuperDome; 14,832	12–15
28	17 February	@ S.E. Melbourne	W 67–122	D. J. Hogg (25)	Denzel Valentine (8)	Jaylen Adams (9)	John Cain Arena; 8,279	13–15

2023–24 season schedule

=== Postseason ===
2024 finals game log
Total: 0–1 (Home: 0–1; Road: 0–0)
Play-in qualifier: 0–1 (Home: 0–1; Road: 0–0)

Game	Date	Team	Score	High points	High rebounds	High assists	Location Attendance	Series
1	28 February	New Zealand	L 76–83	Jaylen Adams (18)	Denzel Valentine (8)	Jaylen Adams (5)	Sydney SuperDome; 8,231	0–1

2024 finals schedule

== Transactions ==
=== Re-signed ===
Player	Date Signed	Contract	Ref.
Jaylin Galloway	21 March 2023	3-year deal (club option)	
Angus Glover	24 March 2023	2-year deal	
Kouat Noi	25 March 2023	1-year deal	
Jackson Makoi	28 March 2023	2-year deal	
Isaac Gattorna	28 August 2023	1-year deal	

=== Additions ===
Player	Date Signed	Contract	Former team	Ref.
Makuach Maluach	12 April 2023	2-year deal (club option)	Melbourne United	
Klairus Amir	4 May 2023	3-year deal	Dream City Christian School	
D. J. Hogg	26 May 2023	2-year deal (club option)	Cairns Taipans	
Jonah Bolden	19 June 2023	1-year deal	Phoenix Suns	
Alex Toohey	24 June 2023	2-year deal (next star)	Gonzaga Bulldogs	
Jaylen Adams	12 July 2023	1-year deal	Qingdao Eagles	
Sam Timmins	20 July 2023	1-year deal	New Zealand Breakers	
Denzel Valentine	26 July 2023	1-year deal	Maine Celtics	
Jasper Rentoy	18 September 2023	1-year deal	Eastern Mavericks	

=== Subtractions ===
Player	Reason left	Date Left	New team	Ref.
Xavier Cooks	Contract buyout	17 March 2023	Washington Wizards	
Justin Simon	Free agent	20 March 2023	Scaligera Verona	
Biwali Bayles	Released	25 May 2023	Illawarra Hawks	
Dejan Vasiljevic	Declined player option	17 October 2023	Adelaide 36ers	

== Awards ==
=== Club awards ===
- Club MVP: Jaylen Adams
- Coaches Award: Alex Toohey
- Player's Player: Jaylen Adams
- Defensive Player: Jordan Hunter
- Hard Work Award: Shaun Bruce
- Members Player of the Year: Jordan Hunter

== See also ==
- 2023–24 NBL season
- Sydney Kings
