= Bobi Klintman =

Swedish basketball player (born 2003)

- Klintman with Virtus Bologna in 2026

No. 34 – Virtus Bologna
- Position: Power forward / center
- League: LBA; EuroLeague

Personal information
- Born: 6 March 2003 (age 23) Malmö, Sweden
- Listed height: 6 ft 9 in (2.06 m)
- Listed weight: 225 lb (102 kg)

Career information
- High school: Sunrise Christian Academy (Bel Aire, Kansas)
- College: Wake Forest (2022–2023)
- NBA draft: 2024: 2nd round, 37th overall pick
- Drafted by: Minnesota Timberwolves
- Playing career: 2019–present

Career history
- 2019–2021: RIG Mark Kinna
- 2021: Borås Basket
- 2023–2024: Cairns Taipans
- 2024–2026: Detroit Pistons
- 2024–2026: →Motor City Cruise
- 2026–present: Virtus Bologna
- Stats at NBA.com
- Stats at Basketball Reference

Bobi Klintman (born 6 March 2003) is a Swedish professional basketball player for Virtus Bologna of the Lega Basket Serie A (LBA) and the EuroLeague. He played college basketball for the Wake Forest Demon Deacons. He was drafted by the Minnesota Timberwolves in the second round of the 2024 NBA draft.

== Early life and high school career ==
Klintman was born in Malmö, Sweden, to a Swedish mother and a father from Senegal. He attended Sweden's RIG Mark Academy in Kinna. In the 2019–20 season, he played 13 games for RIG Mark in the third-tier Basketettan. He continued with RIG Mark in the second-tier Superettan in 2020–21 before the season was cancelled in February 2021 due to the COVID-19 pandemic. He played six games for Borås Basket in the first-tier Basketligan to finish the season.

Klintman enrolled at Sunrise Christian Academy in Bel Aire, Kansas, for the 2021–22 U.S. high school year. He was rated a four-star recruit and initially committed to playing college basketball for Maryland. He later decommitted from Maryland and committed to play for Colorado. Klintman decommitted a second time and ultimately signed to play for Wake Forest.

== College career ==
As a freshman in the 2022–23 season, Klintman played in 33 games with five starts and averaged 5.3 points and 4.5 rebounds in 20.5 minutes per game for the Wake Forest Demon Deacons.

Klintman initially declared for the 2023 NBA draft and later informed Wake Forest that he would not return to the team for the 2023–24 season.

== Professional career ==
=== Cairns Taipans (2023–2024) ===
On 13 June 2023, Klintman signed with the Cairns Taipans of the Australian National Basketball League (NBL), joining the team as part of the league's Next Stars program for the 2023–24 season.

=== Detroit Pistons (2024–2026) ===
On 27 June 2024, Klintman was selected with the 37th overall pick by the Minnesota Timberwolves in the 2024 NBA draft. However, he was traded to the Detroit Pistons along with Wendell Moore Jr. for the 53rd overall pick in the 2024 draft. On July 13, he signed with the Pistons. Throughout his rookie season, he was assigned several times to the Motor City Cruise. Klintman played in eight total games for the Pistons during the 2024–25 season, averaging 1.9 points, 0.9 rebounds, and 0.9 assists.

Klintman made 12 appearances for Detroit during the 2025–26 NBA season, recording averages of 1.8 points, 1.6 rebounds, and 0.5 assists. On 7 April 2026, he was waived by the Pistons after Tolu Smith was signed to a standard contract.

=== Virtus Bologna (2026–present) ===
On 2 July 2026, Klintman signed with Virtus Bologna of the LBA and the EuroLeague.

== National team career ==
Klintman played for the Sweden men's national under-18 basketball team in Finland in the Nordic championships where they won the gold medal. Klintman played for the Sweden under-20 basketball team in the 2022 FIBA U20 European Championship Division B. He was selected for the All-Star team.

== Career statistics ==
Legend
GP	Games played	GS	Games started	MPG	Minutes per game
FG%	Field goal percentage	3P%	3-point field goal percentage	FT%	Free throw percentage
RPG	Rebounds per game	APG	Assists per game	SPG	Steals per game
BPG	Blocks per game	PPG	Points per game	**Bold**	Career high

=== NBA ===
Year	Team	GP	GS	MPG	FG%	3P%	FT%	RPG	APG	SPG	BPG	PPG
2024–25	Detroit	8	0	5.3	**.600**	**.400**	**.500**	.9	**.9**	**.3**	**.1**	**1.9**
2025–26	Detroit	**12**	0	**5.9**	.333	.308	.000	**1.6**	.5	**.3**	.0	1.8
Career		20	0	5.7	.405	.333	.200	1.3	.7	.3	.1	1.9

=== NBL ===
Year	Team	GP	GS	MPG	FG%	3P%	FT%	RPG	APG	SPG	BPG	PPG
2023–24	Cairns	23	6	21.3	.443	.357	.793	4.8	.7	.8	.5	9.7

=== College ===
Year	Team	GP	GS	MPG	FG%	3P%	FT%	RPG	APG	SPG	BPG	PPG
2022–23	Wake Forest	33	5	20.5	.407	.368	.743	4.5	.8	.5	.6	5.3
