= 2023–24 NBL season =

46th season of the Australasian basketball competition

- League: National Basketball League
- Season: 2023–24
- Duration: 28 September 2023 – 18 February 2024; 28 February – 4 March 2024 (Play-in tournament); 7–13 March 2024 (Semifinals); 17–31 March 2024 (Finals)
- Games played: 140
- Teams: 10
- TV partners: Australia: ESPN; Network 10; 10 Peach; New Zealand: Sky Sport; Online: Kayo Sports; NBL TV; 10 Play

Regular season
- Season champions: Melbourne United
- Season MVP: (United States) Bryce Cotton (Perth)

Finals
- Champions: Tasmania JackJumpers (1st title)
- Runners-up: Melbourne United
- Semi-finalists: Perth Wildcats; Illawarra Hawks
- Finals MVP: (Australia) Jack McVeigh (Tasmania)

Statistical leaders
Points	(United States) Bryce Cotton (Perth)	23.1
Rebounds	(United States) Alan Williams (S.E. Melbourne)	10.9
Assists	(Australia) Matthew Dellavedova (Melbourne)	6.0
Efficiency	(Australia) Will Magnay (Tasmania)	70%

Records
- Biggest home win: 38 points Illawarra 116–78 S.E. Melbourne (5 January 2024)
- Biggest away win: 55 points S.E. Melbourne 67–122 Sydney (17 February 2024)
- Highest scoring: 221 points Melbourne 115–106 Illawarra (7 March 2024); Illawarra 113–108 Melbourne (10 March 2024)
- Lowest scoring: 134 points New Zealand 65–69 Illawarra (19 November 2023)
- Winning streak: 6 games Melbourne United (13 October 2023 – 29 October); Perth Wildcats (4 November 2023 – 1 December) (26 December 2023 – 21 January 2024)
- Losing streak: 5 games S.E. Melbourne Phoenix (30 December 2023 – 20 January 2024)
- Highest attendance: 16,605 – Sydney SuperDome; Sydney vs New Zealand (14 January 2024)
- Lowest attendance: 1,923 – Wollongong Entertainment Centre; Illawarra vs Cairns (26 October 2023)
- Attendance: 1,097,455
- Average attendance: 7,126

NBL seasons
- ← 2022–23 2024–25 →
- All statistics correct as of 31 March 2024.

The 2023–24 NBL season was the 46th season of the National Basketball League since its establishment in 1979. A total of ten teams contested in the 2023–24 season.

Australian broadcast rights to the season are held by ESPN in the third season of a three-year deal. All games are available live on ESPN and the streaming platform Kayo Sports. Network 10 will broadcast two Sunday afternoon games on 10 Peach and 10 Play. In New Zealand, Sky Sport will continue as the official league broadcaster.

As Australia and New Zealand participated in 2025 FIBA Asia Cup qualification, the league took a break during the FIBA international windows of 19–30 November 2023 and 18–28 February 2024.

The Tasmania JackJumpers won their maiden NBL championship after defeating Melbourne United in the Championship Series, becoming the first Tasmanian NBL champions since Launceston Casino City in 1981.

== Teams ==
All ten teams from the 2022–23 NBL season continued on in 2023–24.

=== Stadiums and locations ===
Team	Location	Stadium	Capacity
Adelaide 36ers	Adelaide	Adelaide Entertainment Centre	11,300
Brisbane Bullets	Brisbane	Nissan Arena	5,000
Cairns Taipans	Cairns	Cairns Convention Centre	5,300
Illawarra Hawks	Wollongong	WIN Entertainment Centre	6,000
Melbourne United	Melbourne	John Cain Arena	10,175
New Zealand Breakers	Auckland	Spark Arena	9,740
Perth Wildcats	Perth	RAC Arena	14,800
S.E. Melbourne Phoenix	Melbourne	John Cain Arena	10,175
S.E. Melbourne Phoenix	Melbourne	State Basketball Centre	3,200
Sydney Kings	Sydney	Qudos Bank Arena	18,200
Tasmania JackJumpers	Hobart	MyState Bank Arena	4,865
Tasmania JackJumpers	Launceston	Silverdome	3,255

=== Personnel and sponsorship ===
Team	Coach	Captain	Main sponsor	Kit manufacturer
Adelaide 36ers	(Australia) Scott Ninnis	(Australia) Mitch McCarron	Walker Corporation	Champion
Brisbane Bullets	(Australia) Justin Schueller	(Australia) Nathan Sobey	St. Genevieve	Champion
Cairns Taipans	(Australia) Adam Forde	(United States) Tahjere McCall	CQUniversity	Champion
Illawarra Hawks	(United States) Justin Tatum	(Australia) Sam Froling (United States) Tyler Harvey	n/a	Champion
Melbourne United	(Australia) Dean Vickerman	(Australia) Chris Goulding	Engie	Champion
New Zealand Breakers	(Israel) Mody Maor	(New Zealand) Thomas Abercrombie	Bank of New Zealand	Champion
Perth Wildcats	(Australia) John Rillie	(Australia) Jesse Wagstaff	Pentanet	Champion
S.E. Melbourne Phoenix	(United States) Mike Kelly	(Australia) Mitch Creek	Mountain Goat Beer	Champion
Sydney Kings	(Palestine) Mahmoud Abdelfattah	(Australia) Shaun Bruce	Harvey Norman	Champion
Tasmania JackJumpers	(United States) Scott Roth	(Australia) Clint Steindl	Spirit of Tasmania	Champion

=== Player transactions ===
Free agency began on 30 March 2023.

=== Coaching transactions ===
Head coaching transactions
Team	2022–23 season	2023–24 season
Off-season
Brisbane Bullets	Greg Vanderjagt	Justin Schueller
Illawarra Hawks	Jacob Jackomas	
Melbourne United	Dean Vickerman	
Perth Wildcats	John Rillie	
S.E. Melbourne Phoenix	Simon Mitchell	Mike Kelly
Sydney Kings	Chase Buford	Mahmoud Abdelfattah
In-season
Adelaide 36ers	Scott Ninnis (interim)	
Illawarra Hawks	Justin Tatum (interim)	
Tasmania JackJumpers	Scott Roth	
Adelaide 36ers	Scott Ninnis	
Illawarra Hawks	Justin Tatum	

== Pre-season ==
The pre-season games will begin on 10 August to 16 October 2023.

The pre-season also featured the Cairns Taipans, New Zealand Breakers to play games between NBA teams, this will be the fifth NBLxNBA tour.

=== NBL Blitz ===
The 2023 NBL Blitz will run from 16 to 22 September with all games played at the Gold Coast Convention Centre. Gold Coast, Queensland will host the tournament.

Pos	Team	Pld	W	L	PF	PA	PP	BP	Pts
1	Melbourne United (C)	3	3	0	286	250	114.4	7.5	16.5
2	Perth Wildcats	3	3	0	307	264	116.3	6.5	15.5
3	Tasmania JackJumpers	3	3	0	275	251	109.6	6	15
4	Illawarra Hawks	3	2	1	274	263	104.2	8	14
5	New Zealand Breakers	3	1	2	275	260	105.8	6.5	9.5
6	S.E. Melbourne Phoenix	3	1	2	272	283	96.1	6	9
7	Brisbane Bullets	3	1	2	285	267	106.7	5	8
8	Cairns Taipans	3	1	2	285	305	93.4	5	8
9	Adelaide 36ers	3	0	3	237	299	79.3	5	5
10	Sydney Kings	3	0	3	249	303	82.2	4.5	4.5

Updated to match(es) played on 22 September 2023. Source: nblblitz.com.au
(C) Champions

== Regular season ==
The regular season will begin on 28 September 2023. It will consist of 140 games spread across 20 rounds, with the final game being played on 18 February 2024.

=== Round 1 ===
28 September 2023	Melbourne United	82–67	S.E. Melbourne Phoenix	John Cain Arena, Melbourne
19:30	Scoring by quarter: 29–24, 16–9, 19–17, 18–17
ESPN	Pts: Travers 20; Rebs: Hukporti 14; Asts: Dellavedova, Goulding 4	boxscore report	Pts: Ayre 17; Rebs: Creek 9 Asts: Cummings 3	Attendance: 10,175

29 September 2023	Brisbane Bullets	86–71	Adelaide 36ers	Nissan Arena, Brisbane
19:30	Scoring by quarter: 18–28, 23–12, 24–13, 21–18
ESPN	Pts: Sobey 18; Rebs: Baynes 13; Asts: Scott 7	boxscore report	Pts: Humphries 17; Rebs: Wiley 9 Asts: Kell, Wiley 5	Attendance: 4,286

29 September 2023	Perth Wildcats	101–95	Tasmania JackJumpers	Perth Arena, Perth
19:30	Scoring by quarter: 25–26, 25–19, 27–21, 24–29
ESPN	Pts: Usher 35; Rebs: Pinder, Sarr 5 Asts: Cotton 6	boxscore report	Pts: McVeigh 22; Rebs: Lee 9 Asts: Doyle 8	Attendance: 12,361

30 September 2023	New Zealand Breakers	98–87	Cairns Taipans	Spark Arena, Auckland
20:30	Scoring by quarter: 22–25, 24–18, 31–18, 21–26
Sky Sport	Pts: Jackson-Cartwright 25; Rebs: Mathiang 5 Asts: Jackson-Cartwright 8	boxscore report	Pts: Mennenga 17; Rebs: Mayen 6 Asts: Miller 6	Attendance: 6,400

30 September 2023	Illawarra Hawks	81–96	Sydney Kings	Wollongong Entertainment Centre, Wollongong
20:00	Scoring by quarter: 24–26, 15–25, 25–23, 17–22
ESPN	Pts: Harvey 19; Rebs: Froling 11; Asts: Robinson 4	boxscore report	Pts: Noi 23; Rebs: Hunter, Valentine 7 Asts: Valentine 10	Attendance: 4,322

1 October 2023	Adelaide 36ers	74–82	Melbourne United	Adelaide Entertainment Centre, Adelaide
13:30	Scoring by quarter: 19–25, 24–16, 14–16, 17–25
10 Peach	Pts: Cadee 18; Rebs: Galloway 9 Asts: Cadee 6	boxscore report	Pts: Dellavedova, Goulding 19; Rebs: Hukporti 10; Asts: Dellavedova, Travers 4	Attendance: 8,165

1 October 2023	S.E. Melbourne Phoenix	110–99	Perth Wildcats	John Cain Arena, Melbourne
16:00	Scoring by quarter: 24–28, 22–21, 38–12, 26–38
10 Peach	Pts: Cook, Creek 23; Rebs: Cook 10; Asts: Cummings 4	boxscore report	Pts: Henshall 24; Rebs: three players 5 Asts: Cotton 10	Attendance: 6,641

=== Round 2 ===
5 October 2023	New Zealand Breakers	84–89	Brisbane Bullets	Spark Arena, Auckland
19:30	Scoring by quarter: 22–26, 22–22, 23–23, 17–18
Sky Sport	Pts: Jackson-Cartwright 20; Rebs: Cheatham 6 Asts: Jackson-Cartwright 5	boxscore report	Pts: Sobey 24; Rebs: Harrison, Sobey 8 Asts: Norton 6	Attendance: 6,280

5 October 2023	Cairns Taipans	87–80	S.E. Melbourne Phoenix	Cairns Convention Centre, Cairns
18:30	Scoring by quarter: 22–20, 21–18, 23–19, 21–23
ESPN	Pts: Miller 21; Rebs: Waardenburg 14; Asts: Miller 8	boxscore report	Pts: Creek 20; Rebs: Creek 8 Asts: Browne 4	Attendance: 3,906

6 October 2023	Tasmania JackJumpers	80–72	Sydney Kings	Derwent Entertainment Centre, Hobart
19:30	Scoring by quarter: 18–19, 30–21, 16–17, 16–15
ESPN	Pts: Doyle 21; Rebs: McVeigh 7 Asts: Crawford 4	boxscore report	Pts: Adams 21; Rebs: Toohey 9 Asts: Adams, Valentine 4	Attendance: 4,340

6 October 2023	Perth Wildcats	82–75	Adelaide 36ers	Perth Arena, Perth
18:30	Scoring by quarter: 28–17, 16–14, 20–29, 18–15
ESPN	Pts: Cotton 19; Rebs: Pinder 7 Asts: Cotton 5	boxscore report	Pts: Humphries 18; Rebs: Wiley 8 Asts: Cadee, McCarron 4	Attendance: 11,306

7 October 2023	Illawarra Hawks	113–106	S.E. Melbourne Phoenix	Wollongong Entertainment Centre, Wollongong
17:30	Scoring by quarter: 26–26, 34–29, 22–27, 31–24
ESPN	Pts: Robinson 26; Rebs: Froling, Swaka Lo Buluk 8 Asts: Robinson 7	boxscore report	Pts: Cummings 28; Rebs: Creek 8 Asts: Creek, Cummings 3	Attendance: 3,590

7 October 2023	Brisbane Bullets	86–89	Cairns Taipans	Nissan Arena, Brisbane
19:00	Scoring by quarter: 18–26, 20–17, 18–27, 30–19
ESPN	Pts: Sobey 31; Rebs: McDaniel 8 Asts: Scott 7	boxscore report	Pts: Miller 21; Rebs: Waardenburg 7 Asts: Kuol, Miller 5	Attendance: 4,023

8 October 2023	Melbourne United	75–80	Tasmania JackJumpers	John Cain Arena, Melbourne
14:00	Scoring by quarter: 18–16, 18–19, 25–18, 14–27
10 Peach	Pts: Hukporti 15; Rebs: Travers 8 Asts: Dellavedova 6	boxscore report	Pts: Doyle 25; Rebs: Doyle 8 Asts: Crawford 6	Attendance: 10,175

8 October 2023	Sydney Kings	109–100	Adelaide 36ers	Sydney SuperDome, Sydney
16:00	Scoring by quarter: 32–22, 25–26, 18–24, 34–28
10 Peach	Pts: Hunter 20; Rebs: Hunter 8 Asts: Adams 8	boxscore report	Pts: Kell 28; Rebs: McCarron 10; Asts: Wiley 5	Attendance: 14,029

=== Round 3 ===
12 October 2023	Tasmania JackJumpers	103–73	Illawarra Hawks	Derwent Entertainment Centre, Hobart
19:30	Scoring by quarter: 24–19, 31–10, 26–25, 22–19
ESPN	Pts: Doyle 19; Rebs: Doyle 9 Asts: Crawford 6	boxscore report	Pts: Clark 16; Rebs: Froling 10; Asts: Robinson 6	Attendance: 4,340

13 October 2023	Brisbane Bullets	102–113	Sydney Kings	Nissan Arena, Brisbane
18:30	Scoring by quarter: 25–29, 17–27, 25–29, 35–28
ESPN	Pts: Sobey 26; Rebs: Sobey 7 Asts: Scott 11	boxscore report	Pts: Adams 26; Rebs: Bolden 12; Asts: Valentine 6	Attendance: 3,713

13 October 2023	Perth Wildcats	81–88	Melbourne United	Perth Arena, Perth
18:30	Scoring by quarter: 17–22, 18–17, 17–21, 29–28
ESPN	Pts: Pinder 25; Rebs: Sarr 9 Asts: C.Webster 5	boxscore report	Pts: Goulding 18; Rebs: Hukporti 7 Asts: Dellavedova 6	Attendance: 10,982

14 October 2023	Adelaide 36ers	89–80	Illawarra Hawks	Adelaide Entertainment Centre, Adelaide
17:00	Scoring by quarter: 23–25, 16–15, 15–20, 35–20
ESPN	Pts: Kell 25; Rebs: Kell, Wiley 9 Asts: Cadee 4	boxscore report	Pts: Froling 21; Rebs: Clark 11; Asts: Robinson 4	Attendance: 9,108

14 October 2023	S.E. Melbourne Phoenix	86–85	Tasmania JackJumpers	John Cain Arena, Melbourne
20:00	Scoring by quarter: 18–23, 25–20, 25–21, 18–21
ESPN	Pts: Browne 20; Rebs: Browne 9 Asts: Browne 4	boxscore report	Pts: Crawford 27; Rebs: McVeigh 9 Asts: Crawford 6	Attendance: 6,017

15 October 2023	Melbourne United	89–78	Brisbane Bullets	John Cain Arena, Melbourne
14:00	Scoring by quarter: 14–14, 29–14, 23–17, 23–33
10 Peach	Pts: Goulding 18; Rebs: Hukporti 12; Asts: Ili 8	boxscore report	Pts: Scott 19; Rebs: Harrison 8 Asts: Sobey 5	Attendance: 9,327

15 October 2023	Sydney Kings	99–86	Perth Wildcats	Sydney SuperDome, Sydney
16:00	Scoring by quarter: 28–26, 22–16, 20–20, 29–24
10 Peach	Pts: Hunter 20; Rebs: Bolden 15; Asts: Adams 6	boxscore report	Pts: Cotton 22; Rebs: Pinder 7 Asts: T.Webster 5	Attendance: 10,546

=== Round 4 ===
19 October 2023	Adelaide 36ers	85–102	S.E. Melbourne Phoenix	Adelaide Entertainment Centre, Adelaide
19:00	Scoring by quarter: 28–28, 14–26, 23–23, 20–25
ESPN	Pts: Kell 21; Rebs: Wiley 8 Asts: three players 2	boxscore report	Pts: Creek 23; Rebs: Williams 13; Asts: Browne 8	Attendance: 6,870

20 October 2023	Illawarra Hawks	91–101	Melbourne United	Wollongong Entertainment Centre, Wollongong
19:30	Scoring by quarter: 22–29, 29–30, 12–18, 28–24
ESPN	Pts: Harvey 19; Rebs: Clark 9 Asts: Robinson 5	boxscore report	Pts: Hukporti 21; Rebs: Hukporti 10; Asts: Ili 8	Attendance: 2,927

21 October 2023	S.E. Melbourne Phoenix	96–73	Brisbane Bullets	John Cain Arena, Melbourne
17:30	Scoring by quarter: 17–15, 28–18, 22–16, 29–24
ESPN	Pts: Williams 21; Rebs: Creek, Moller 7 Asts: Browne, Williams 3	boxscore report	Pts: Sobey, White 14; Rebs: Harrison, Sobey 7 Asts: Norton 5	Attendance: 5,552

21 October 2023	Adelaide 36ers	89–78	Perth Wildcats	Adelaide Entertainment Centre, Adelaide
19:30	Scoring by quarter: 23–20, 16–20, 28–25, 22–13
ESPN	Pts: Humphries 26; Rebs: Humphries, Wiley 8 Asts: Vasiljevic 6	boxscore report	Pts: Pinder 17; Rebs: Pinder 13; Asts: Pinder 5	Attendance: 8,140

22 October 2023	Melbourne United	97–88	New Zealand Breakers	John Cain Arena, Melbourne
14:00	Scoring by quarter: 23–13, 19–30, 22–20, 33–25
10 Peach	Pts: Clark 18; Rebs: Hukporti 6 Asts: Ili 4	boxscore report	Pts: Cheatham 30; Rebs: McDowell-White 7 Asts: McDowell-White 9	Attendance: 9,579

22 October 2023	Sydney Kings	95–105	Tasmania JackJumpers	Sydney SuperDome, Sydney
16:00	Scoring by quarter: 25–36, 20–21, 23–18, 27–30
10 Peach	Pts: Adams 21; Rebs: Adams 10; Asts: Valentine 6	boxscore report	Pts: Crawford 32; Rebs: Lee 13; Asts: Crawford 4	Attendance: 10,721

=== Round 5 ===
26 October 2023	New Zealand Breakers	85–97	Adelaide 36ers	Spark Arena, Auckland
19:30	Scoring by quarter: 26–24, 22–20, 23–26, 14–27
Sky Sport	Pts: Lamb 25; Rebs: Cheatham 8 Asts: McDowell-White 11	boxscore report	Pts: Vasiljevic 24; Rebs: Wiley 13; Asts: Vasiljevic 5	Attendance: 4,646

26 October 2023	Illawarra Hawks	84–83	Cairns Taipans	Wollongong Entertainment Centre, Wollongong
19:30	Scoring by quarter: 24–15, 20–23, 17–22, 23–23
ESPN	Pts: Harvey 20; Rebs: Froling 13; Asts: Harvey 5	boxscore report	Pts: Miller 24; Rebs: Klintman 7 Asts: Miller 7	Attendance: 1,923

27 October 2023	Tasmania JackJumpers	82–90	Melbourne United	Derwent Entertainment Centre, Hobart
19:30	Scoring by quarter: 21–21, 21–22, 15–30, 25–17
ESPN	Pts: McVeigh 20; Rebs: Lee 9 Asts: Doyle 5	boxscore report	Pts: Clark 19; Rebs: Travers 13; Asts: Ili 6	Attendance: 4,340

27 October 2023	Perth Wildcats	79–84	Brisbane Bullets	Perth Arena, Perth
18:30	Scoring by quarter: 9–20, 27–22, 16–26, 27–16
ESPN	Pts: Pinder 22; Rebs: Doolittle 11; Asts: Cotton 5	boxscore report	Pts: Sobey 17; Rebs: McDaniel 8 Asts: Norton 4	Attendance: 10,481

28 October 2023	S.E. Melbourne Phoenix	103–100	New Zealand Breakers	John Cain Arena, Melbourne
17:30	Scoring by quarter: 31–21, 29–27, 24–20, 19–32
ESPN	Pts: Williams 21; Rebs: Williams 13; Asts: Browne 8	boxscore report	Pts: Jackson-Cartwright 33; Rebs: Mathiang 9 Asts: Jackson-Cartwright 8	Attendance: 6,195

28 October 2023	Cairns Taipans	87–80	Sydney Kings	Cairns Convention Centre, Cairns
19:00	Scoring by quarter: 26–20, 25–22, 18–19, 18–19
ESPN	Pts: Kuol 24; Rebs: Klintman 8 Asts: three players 3	boxscore report	Pts: Noi 18; Rebs: Adams 3 Asts: four players 2	Attendance: 4,587

29 October 2023	Melbourne United	96–84	Illawarra Hawks	John Cain Arena, Melbourne
14:00	Scoring by quarter: 24–29, 28–22, 19–18, 25–15
10 Peach	Pts: Goulding 33; Rebs: Travers 11; Asts: Krebs 4	boxscore report	Pts: Clark 24; Rebs: three players 4 Asts: Robinson 9	Attendance: 9,067

29 October 2023	Brisbane Bullets	90–87	Tasmania JackJumpers	Nissan Arena, Brisbane
15:00	Scoring by quarter: 24–21, 21–18, 24–23, 21–25
10 Peach	Pts: Sobey 28; Rebs: Bannan 10; Asts: Norton 4	boxscore report	Pts: McVeigh 18; Rebs: Krslovic, Lee 7 Asts: Doyle 8	Attendance: 4,559

=== Round 6 ===
2 November 2023	Brisbane Bullets	108–92	S.E. Melbourne Phoenix	Nissan Arena, Brisbane
18:30	Scoring by quarter: 26–23, 33–19, 24–29, 25–21
ESPN	Pts: Bannan 17; Rebs: Bannan 11; Asts: Norton 9	boxscore report	Pts: Browne 25; Rebs: Browne 8 Asts: Browne 5	Attendance: 2,834

3 November 2023	New Zealand Breakers	91–81	Cairns Taipans	Christchurch Arena, Christchurch
19:30	Scoring by quarter: 21–23, 16–15, 30–17, 24–26
Sky Sport	Pts: Lamb 19; Rebs: Mathiang 11; Asts: Jackson-Cartwright 7	boxscore report	Pts: Kuol, Mayen 18; Rebs: Mayen, Mennenga 7 Asts: Mayen, Waardenburg 5	Attendance: 4,909

3 November 2023	Illawarra Hawks	83–103	Sydney Kings	Wollongong Entertainment Centre, Wollongong
19:30	Scoring by quarter: 17–20, 25–32, 18–32, 23–19
ESPN	Pts: Clark 23; Rebs: Froling 11; Asts: Robinson 4	boxscore report	Pts: Adams, Maluach 16; Rebs: Bolden, Hunter 9 Asts: Adams 7	Attendance: 3,934

4 November 2023	Tasmania JackJumpers	87–85	Brisbane Bullets	Silverdome, Launceston
17:30	Scoring by quarter: 21–19, 20–26, 34–21, 12–19
ESPN	Pts: Doyle 24; Rebs: Lee 7 Asts: Crawford 8	boxscore report	Pts: Harrison 20; Rebs: Bannan, Harrison 8 Asts: Bannan, Norton 3	Attendance: 3,255

4 November 2023	Perth Wildcats	99–88	Adelaide 36ers	Perth Arena, Perth
17:00	Scoring by quarter: 19–22, 31–22, 23–24, 26–20
ESPN	Pts: Cotton 29; Rebs: Doolittle 8 Asts: Cotton 4	boxscore report	Pts: Kell 25; Rebs: Starling 6 Asts: Kell 6	Attendance: 11,326

5 November 2023	S.E. Melbourne Phoenix	91–78	Cairns Taipans	John Cain Arena, Melbourne
14:00	Scoring by quarter: 23–23, 24–20, 22–18, 22–17
10 Peach	Pts: Creek 21; Rebs: Williams 15; Asts: Browne 8	boxscore report	Pts: three players 12; Rebs: McCall 10; Asts: Kuol 4	Attendance: 7,511

5 November 2023	Sydney Kings	87–85	New Zealand Breakers	Sydney SuperDome, Sydney
16:00	Scoring by quarter: 27–21, 28–23, 17–23, 15–18
10 Peach	Pts: Hogg 18; Rebs: Hogg 7 Asts: Adams 9	boxscore report	Pts: Lamb 29; Rebs: McDowell-White 8 Asts: Jackson-Cartwright 5	Attendance: 12,143

6 November 2023	Melbourne United	95–102(OT)	Perth Wildcats	John Cain Arena, Melbourne
19:30	Scoring by quarter: 26–24, 23–22, 20–21, 20–22, Overtime: 6–13
ESPN	Pts: Lual-Acuil 25; Rebs: Bowen 16; Asts: Dellavedova, Ili 6	boxscore report	Pts: Cotton 24; Rebs: Wagstaff 8 Asts: Doolittle 5	Attendance: 10,175

=== Round 7 ===
10 November 2023	Perth Wildcats	94–76	New Zealand Breakers	Perth Arena, Perth
18:30	Scoring by quarter: 34–17, 18–19, 21–22, 21–18
ESPN	Pts: Cotton 37; Rebs: Doolittle 11; Asts: Doolittle, H.Harris 4	boxscore report	Pts: Lamb 25; Rebs: Mathiang 14; Asts: McDowell-White 6	Attendance: 10,685

11 November 2023	Cairns Taipans	81–71	Illawarra Hawks	Cairns Convention Centre, Cairns
16:30	Scoring by quarter: 14–18, 19–20, 23–17, 25–16
ESPN	Pts: Kuol 19; Rebs: Gak, Mayen 8 Asts: Armstrong 4	boxscore report	Pts: Clark 19; Rebs: Froling 10; Asts: Harvey 4	Attendance: 4,614

11 November 2023	Adelaide 36ers	72–82	Tasmania JackJumpers	Adelaide Entertainment Centre, Adelaide
19:30	Scoring by quarter: 15–17, 16–22, 16–24, 25–19
ESPN	Pts: Vasiljevic 19; Rebs: McCarron 8 Asts: Marshall 4	boxscore report	Pts: Crawford 17; Rebs: Lee 8 Asts: Doyle 8	Attendance: 9,440

12 November 2023	S.E. Melbourne Phoenix	83–92	Melbourne United	John Cain Arena, Melbourne
14:00	Scoring by quarter: 24–23, 18–21, 25–24, 16–24
10 Peach	Pts: Creek 19; Rebs: Moller 9 Asts: Browne, Cummings 4	boxscore report	Pts: Goulding 27; Rebs: Lual-Acuil 11; Asts: Ili 4	Attendance: 10,175

12 November 2023	Sydney Kings	104–95	Brisbane Bullets	Sydney SuperDome, Sydney
16:00	Scoring by quarter: 20–26, 25–25, 31–20, 28–24
10 Peach	Pts: Adams 24; Rebs: Bolden 9 Asts: Adams, Hunter 4	boxscore report	Pts: Sobey 17; Rebs: Bannan 5 Asts: Sobey 5	Attendance: 10,235

=== Round 8 ===
16 November 2023	Tasmania JackJumpers	92–97	New Zealand Breakers	Silverdome, Launceston
19:30	Scoring by quarter: 30–31, 17–25, 19–23, 26–18
ESPN	Pts: Magnay 20; Rebs: Magnay 13; Asts: Doyle 6	boxscore report	Pts: Lamb 24; Rebs: Lamb 11; Asts: Jackson-Cartwright 3	Attendance: 3,255

16 November 2023	Perth Wildcats	88–80	Cairns Taipans	Perth Arena, Perth
18:30	Scoring by quarter: 25–20, 22–23, 19–13, 22–24
ESPN	Pts: Cotton 25; Rebs: Doolittle 8 Asts: Cotton 4	boxscore report	Pts: McCall 19; Rebs: Armstrong 6 Asts: Miller 6	Attendance: 9,976

17 November 2023	Adelaide 36ers	96–93	S.E. Melbourne Phoenix	Adelaide Entertainment Centre, Adelaide
19:00	Scoring by quarter: 18–35, 17–18, 31–14, 30–26
ESPN	Pts: Vasiljevic 29; Rebs: Wiley 14; Asts: Cadee 4	boxscore report	Pts: Williams 23; Rebs: Williams 11; Asts: Ayre 4	Attendance: 7,833

18 November 2023	Cairns Taipans	87–90(OT)	Tasmania JackJumpers	Cairns Convention Centre, Cairns
16:30	Scoring by quarter: 17–24, 27–18, 23–19, 10–16, Overtime: 10–13
ESPN	Pts: Miller 26; Rebs: Armstrong; Asts: three players 4	boxscore report	Pts: Drmic 9 Rebs: McVeigh 24; Asts: three players 4	Attendance: 4,194

18 November 2023	Brisbane Bullets	76–79	Perth Wildcats	Nissan Arena, Brisbane
19:00	Scoring by quarter: 16–14, 17–18, 20–18, 23–29
ESPN	Pts: Smith 23; Rebs: Bannan, White 6 Asts: Norton 4	boxscore report	Pts: Cotton 25; Rebs: Pinder 10; Asts: three players 3	Attendance: 4,869

19 November 2023	New Zealand Breakers	65–69	Illawarra Hawks	Spark Arena, Auckland
16:00	Scoring by quarter: 12–19, 23–17, 16–17, 14–16
10 Peach	Pts: Jackson-Cartwright, Lamb 20; Rebs: Lamb 7 Asts: Jackson-Cartwright 6	boxscore report	Pts: Froling, Harvey 16; Rebs: Froling 12; Asts: Robinson 4	Attendance: 5,703

19 November 2023	Melbourne United	105–93	Sydney Kings	John Cain Arena, Melbourne
16:00	Scoring by quarter: 21–22, 17–31, 27–19, 40–21
10 Peach	Pts: Goulding 35; Rebs: Travers 12; Asts: Ili 9	boxscore report	Pts: Hogg 20; Rebs: Bolden 9 Asts: Valentine 7	Attendance: 10,175

=== Round 9 ===
30 November 2023	New Zealand Breakers	96–83	Adelaide 36ers	Christchurch Arena, Christchurch
17:30	Scoring by quarter: 37–17, 16–24, 24–19, 19–23
Sky Sport	Pts: Lamb 24; Rebs: Jackson-Cartwright, Lamb 6 Asts: Jackson-Cartwright 9	boxscore report	Pts: Vasiljevic 14; Rebs: Wiley 12; Asts: Vasiljevic 4	Attendance: 3,936

1 December 2023	Cairns Taipans	79–84	Brisbane Bullets	Cairns Convention Centre, Cairns
18:30	Scoring by quarter: 21–17, 21–26, 12–25, 25–16
ESPN	Pts: McCall 29; Rebs: Kuol 6 Asts: Miller 7	boxscore report	Pts: Smith 17; Rebs: Bannan 8 Asts: three players 3	Attendance: 4,007

1 December 2023	Perth Wildcats	114–105	Sydney Kings	Perth Arena, Perth
18:30	Scoring by quarter: 23–26, 27–31, 33–26, 31–22
ESPN	Pts: Cotton 41; Rebs: Pinder 9 Asts: Cotton 7	boxscore report	Pts: Bolden 28; Rebs: Valentine 9 Asts: Adams 8	Attendance: 11,897

2 December 2023	S.E. Melbourne Phoenix	90–79	New Zealand Breakers	John Cain Arena, Melbourne
17:30	Scoring by quarter: 16–19, 25–26, 25–20, 24–14
ESPN	Pts: Creek 26; Rebs: Williams 14; Asts: Williams 8	boxscore report	Pts: Le'afa 17; Rebs: Mathiang 8 Asts: Jackson-Cartwright 7	Attendance: 6,244

2 December 2023	Tasmania JackJumpers	94–59	Adelaide 36ers	Derwent Entertainment Centre, Hobart
20:00	Scoring by quarter: 25–15, 20–8, 28–20, 21–16
ESPN	Pts: Doyle 20; Rebs: Lee 10; Asts: Doyle 6	boxscore report	Pts: Vasiljevic 15; Rebs: Starling 8 Asts: Starling 3	Attendance: 4,340

3 December 2023	Melbourne United	103–115	Cairns Taipans	John Cain Arena, Melbourne
14:00	Scoring by quarter: 17–31, 34–36, 25–21, 27–27
10 Peach	Pts: Goulding 23; Rebs: Lual-Acuil 9 Asts: Dellavedova 9	boxscore report	Pts: Miller 32; Rebs: Roberts 5 Asts: Miller 5	Attendance: 9,384

3 December 2023	Brisbane Bullets	78–77	Illawarra Hawks	Nissan Arena, Brisbane
15:00	Scoring by quarter: 28–26, 22–23, 15–13, 13–16
10 Peach	Pts: Smith 16; Rebs: Harrison 8 Asts: Sobey 6	boxscore report	Pts: Clark, Robinson 13; Rebs: Clark 9 Asts: Olbrich, Robinson 4	Attendance: 3,572

=== Round 10 ===
7 December 2023	Cairns Taipans	83–86	Sydney Kings	Cairns Convention Centre, Cairns
18:30	Scoring by quarter: 15–33, 22–15, 21–23, 25–15
ESPN	Pts: Miller 22; Rebs: McCall 6 Asts: Miller 7	boxscore report	Pts: Adams 24; Rebs: Hunter 10; Asts: Adams 7	Attendance: 4,126

8 December 2023	Illawarra Hawks	100–82	Perth Wildcats	Wollongong Entertainment Centre, Wollongong
19:30	Scoring by quarter: 38–18, 20–25, 15–22, 27–17
ESPN	Pts: Froing 21; Rebs: Clark 10; Asts: Harvey 7	boxscore report	Pts: Usher 17; Rebs: Pinder 10; Asts: Cotton 7	Attendance: 2,921

9 December 2023	New Zealand Breakers	80–97	Tasmania JackJumpers	Spark Arena, Auckland
19:30	Scoring by quarter: 24–26, 8–23, 24–26, 24–22
Sky Sport	Pts: Jackson-Cartwright 25; Rebs: Lamb 9 Asts: Jackson-Cartwright 6	boxscore report	Pts: Crawford 30; Rebs: Magnay 12; Asts: Krslovic 4	Attendance: 4,908

9 December 2023	Adelaide 36ers	101–116	Cairns Taipans	Adelaide Entertainment Centre, Adelaide
19:30	Scoring by quarter: 26–35, 31–26, 27–24, 17–31
ESPN	Pts: Vasiljevic 30; Rebs: Humphries 9 Asts: Kell 6	boxscore report	Pts: Miller 26; Rebs: Waardenburg 9 Asts: McCall 15	Attendance: 8,954

10 December 2023	Melbourne United	103–68	Brisbane Bullets	John Cain Arena, Melbourne
14:00	Scoring by quarter: 18–21, 36–16, 23–22, 26–9
10 Peach	Pts: Goulding 21; Rebs: Hukporti 8 Asts: Dellavedova 5	boxscore report	Pts: McDaniel, Sobey 12; Rebs: Mitchell 9 Asts: Scott 3	Attendance: 9,635

10 December 2023	Sydney Kings	94–104	S.E. Melbourne Phoenix	Sydney SuperDome, Sydney
16:00	Scoring by quarter: 30–32, 19–26, 22–24, 23–22
10 Peach	Pts: Adams 19; Rebs: Bolden 15; Asts: three players 3	boxscore report	Pts: Creek 33; Rebs: Williams 15; Asts: Browne 9	Attendance: 13,197

=== Round 11 ===
14 December 2023	S.E. Melbourne Phoenix	78–106	Melbourne United	John Cain Arena, Melbourne
19:30	Scoring by quarter: 18–35, 28–31, 18–11, 14–29
ESPN	Pts: Browne 22; Rebs: Williams 16; Asts: Creek 6	boxscore report	Pts: Lual-Acuil 17; Rebs: Hukporti 8 Asts: Dellavedova 8	Attendance: 7,672

15 December 2023	Cairns Taipans	82–111	New Zealand Breakers	Cairns Convention Centre, Cairns
18:30	Scoring by quarter: 18–36, 18–26, 29–29, 17–20
ESPN	Pts: Armstrong 15; Rebs: Waardenburg 6 Asts: Miller 5	boxscore report	Pts: Lamb 29; Rebs: Lamb, Rubštavičius 8 Asts: Jackson-Cartwright 8	Attendance: 3,584

15 December 2023	Perth Wildcats	89–88	Tasmania JackJumpers	Perth Arena, Perth
18:30	Scoring by quarter: 23–26, 17–22, 28–23, 21–17
ESPN	Pts: Cotton 28; Rebs: Cotton 8 Asts: Cotton, Pinder 4	boxscore report	Pts: Crawford 29; Rebs: Magnay 10; Asts: Doyle 4	Attendance: 12,600

16 December 2023	S.E. Melbourne Phoenix	72–100	Illawarra Hawks	Gippsland Regional Indoor Sports Stadium, Traralgon
17:30	Scoring by quarter: 27–22, 12–26, 19–25, 14–27
ESPN	Pts: Williams 17; Rebs: Williams 12; Asts: Browne 6	boxscore report	Pts: Harvey 25; Rebs: Clark 13; Asts: Robinson 5	Attendance: 3,082

16 December 2023	Melbourne United	107–96	Adelaide 36ers	John Cain Arena, Melbourne
20:00	Scoring by quarter: 28–23, 27–19, 25–30, 27–24
ESPN	Pts: Ili 16; Rebs: Lual-Acuil 12; Asts: Dellavedova 7	boxscore report	Pts: Vasiljevic 23; Rebs: Wiley 9 Asts: Vailjevic 6	Attendance: 7,757

17 December 2023	Tasmania JackJumpers	84–90	Sydney Kings	Derwent Entertainment Centre, Hobart
14:00	Scoring by quarter: 24–21, 9–18, 19–18, 30–33
10 Peach	Pts: McVeigh 23; Rebs: McVeigh 7 Asts: Doyle, Macdonald 3	boxscore report	Pts: Galloway 22; Rebs: Valentine 7 Asts: Adams 10	Attendance: 4,340

17 December 2023	Brisbane Bullets	101–102	Cairns Taipans	Nissan Arena, Brisbane
15:00	Scoring by quarter: 17–35, 26–21, 24–23, 34–23
10 Peach	Pts: Sobey 24; Rebs: Bannan 10; Asts: McDaniel 3	boxscore report	Pts: McCall 25; Rebs: Armstrong, Waardenburg 7 Asts: McCall 9	Attendance: 4,722

=== Round 12 ===
22 December 2023	New Zealand Breakers	109–101	Sydney Kings	Spark Arena, Auckland
19:30	Scoring by quarter: 29–17, 24–36, 33–15, 23–33
Sky Sport	Pts: Lamb 24; Rebs: Mathiang 5 Asts: Jackson-Cartwright 9	boxscore report	Pts: Noi 19; Rebs: Toohey 7 Asts: Hogg 8	Attendance: 5,228

22 December 2023	Cairns Taipans	94–75	S.E. Melbourne Phoenix	Cairns Convention Centre, Cairns
18:30	Scoring by quarter: 30–18, 16–26, 20–15, 28–16
ESPN	Pts: Waardenburg 20; Rebs: McCall 8 Asts: Miller 9	boxscore report	Pts: Williams 29; Rebs: Williams 8 Asts: Browne 6	Attendance: 3,651

23 December 2023	Illawarra Hawks	89–100	Tasmania JackJumpers	Wollongong Entertainment Centre, Wollongong
17:30	Scoring by quarter: 10–23, 20–28, 26–22, 33–27
ESPN	Pts: Froling 22; Rebs: Froling 11; Asts: Harvey, Robinson 5	boxscore report	Pts: Crawford 20; Rebs: Magnay 7 Asts: Doyle 7	Attendance: 4,037

23 December 2023	Melbourne United	109–103(OT)	Perth Wildcats	John Cain Arena, Melbourne
20:00	Scoring by quarter: 21–26, 21–24, 21–21, Overtime: 17–11
ESPN	Pts: Clark 25; Rebs: Hukporti 12; Asts: Ili 7	boxscore report	Pts: Cotton 36; Rebs: Pinder 9 Asts: Doolittle, Pinder 4	Attendance: 10,175

24 December 2023	Adelaide 36ers	95–88	Brisbane Bullets	Adelaide Entertainment Centre, Adelaide
13:30	Scoring by quarter: 27–23, 25–19, 18–21, 25–25
10 Peach	Pts: Vasiljevic 23; Rebs: Wiley 12; Asts: Vasiljevic 6	boxscore report	Pts: Sobey 36; Rebs: Bannan 10; Asts: Norton, Sobey 2	Attendance: 9,440

25 December 2023	Tasmania JackJumpers	77–85	S.E. Melbourne Phoenix	Derwent Entertainment Centre, Hobart
17:30	Scoring by quarter: 12–19, 28–20, 22–22, 15–24
ESPN	Pts: McVeigh 20; Rebs: Magnay 11; Asts: Crawford 4	boxscore report	Pts: Browne, Nader 20; Rebs: Browne 11; Asts: Browne 6	Attendance: 4,340

25 December 2023	Sydney Kings	90–94	Illawarra Hawks	Sydney SuperDome, Sydney
19:30	Scoring by quarter: 29–17, 19–29, 25–31, 17–17
10 Peach	Pts: Adams 22; Rebs: Hunter 8 Asts: Adams 5	boxscore report	Pts: Froling 20; Rebs: Olbrich 10; Asts: Robinson 5	Attendance: 8,578

26 December 2023	Cairns Taipans	102–105	Perth Wildcats	Cairns Convention Centre, Cairns
18:30	Scoring by quarter: 17–26, 26–28, 24–22, 35–29
ESPN	Pts: Klintman 24; Rebs: Mennenga 10; Asts: Miller 7	boxscore report	Pts: Cotton 33; Rebs: Doolittle 16; Asts: Pinder, T.Webster 4	Attendance: 4,050

27 December 2023	Brisbane Bullets	71–81	New Zealand Breakers	Nissan Arena, Brisbane
18:30	Scoring by quarter: 15–15, 20–24, 18–20, 18–22
ESPN	Pts: Sobey 16; Rebs: Smith 12; Asts: Smith 4	boxscore report	Pts: Lamb 18; Rebs: Lamb 13; Asts: Jackson-Cartwright 7	Attendance: 4,796

=== Round 13 ===
28 December 2023	Adelaide 36ers	82–100	Perth Wildcats	Adelaide Entertainment Centre, Adelaide
19:00	Scoring by quarter: 29–34, 19–20, 9–28, 25–18
ESPN	Pts: Humphries 24; Rebs: Starling 7 Asts: Vasiljevic 6	boxscore report	Pts: Cotton 24; Rebs: Doolittle, Pinder, 5 Asts: Cotton 6	Attendance: 9,468

29 December 2023	Sydney Kings	101–82	Cairns Taipans	Sydney SuperDome, Sydney
19:30	Scoring by quarter: 27–24, 27–21, 15–12, 32–25
ESPN	Pts: Valentine 29; Rebs: Hunter 16; Asts: Hogg 5	boxscore report	Pts: Miller 18; Rebs: Waardenburg 8 Asts: McCall, Miller 6	Attendance: 12,783

30 December 2023	Brisbane Bullets	95–83	S.E. Melbourne Phoenix	Nissan Arena, Brisbane
19:00	Scoring by quarter: 32–23, 25–19, 15–25, 23–16
ESPN	Pts: Sobey 35; Rebs: Harrison 8 Asts: Scott 7	boxscore report	Pts: Kenyon 14; Rebs: Creek, Williams 11; Asts: Ayre 5	Attendance: 4,208

31 December 2023	Illawarra Hawks	91–84	Adelaide 36ers	Wollongong Entertainment Centre, Wollongong
17:30	Scoring by quarter: 19–12, 21–29, 31–12, 20–31
10 Peach	Pts: Robinson 19; Rebs: Clark 12; Asts: three players 3	boxscore report	Pts: Humphires 26; Rebs: Kell 10; Asts: Kell 12	Attendance: 5,101

31 December 2023	Cairns Taipans	95–78	Melbourne United	Cairns Convention Centre, Cairns
18:30	Scoring by quarter: 26–19, 19–21, 21–23, 29–15
10 Peach	Pts: Miller 31; Rebs: Mennenga 11; Asts: McCall 10	boxscore report	Pts: Lual-Acuil 15; Rebs: Hukporti, Travers 7 Asts: Dellavedova, Travers 2	Attendance: 4,802

1 January 2024	Tasmania JackJumpers	93–98	New Zealand Breakers	Derwent Entertainment Centre, Hobart
16:00	Scoring by quarter: 25–19, 15–21, 24–30, 29–28
ESPN	Pts: Macdonald 23; Rebs: Lee 13; Asts: McVeigh 5	boxscore report	Pts: Jackson-Cartwright 27; Rebs: Mathiang 7 Asts: McDowell-White 6	Attendance: 4,340

=== Round 14 ===
4 January 2024	Sydney Kings	85–101	Melbourne United	Sydney SuperDome, Sydney
19:30	Scoring by quarter: 23–18, 17–20, 19–35, 26–28
ESPN	Pts: Bruce 16; Rebs: Hunter 9 Asts: Valentine 8	boxscore report	Pts: Ili 19; Rebs: Lual-Acuil 9 Asts: Dellavedova 9	Attendance: 12,898

5 January 2024	Illawarra Hawks	116–78	S.E. Melbourne Phoenix	Wollongong Entertainment Centre, Wollongong
19:30	Scoring by quarter: 24–15, 29–21, 33–23, 30–19
ESPN	Pts: Froling 20; Rebs: Clark 13; Asts: Clark 4	boxscore report	Pts: Creek 24; Rebs: Creek 7 Asts: Foxwell 5	Attendance: 4,079

6 January 2024	Tasmania JackJumpers	103–86	Cairns Taipans	Derwent Entertainment Centre, Hobart
17:30	Scoring by quarter: 29–20, 22–21, 28–18, 24–27
ESPN	Pts: Doyle 31; Rebs: Drmic 8 Asts: Crawford 7	boxscore report	Pts: McCall 20; Rebs: Mennenga 8 Asts: McCall 6	Attendance: 4,340

6 January 2024	Adelaide 36ers	100–96	Melbourne United	Adelaide Entertainment Centre, Adelaide
19:30	Scoring by quarter: 27–23, 19–19, 31–24, 23–30
ESPN	Pts: Vasiljevic 30; Rebs: Kell 10; Asts: Kell 5	boxscore report	Pts: Krebs 23; Rebs: Lual-Acuil 17; Asts: Dellavedova 9	Attendance: 9,564

7 January 2024	New Zealand Breakers	102–108	Perth Wildcats	Spark Arena, Auckland
16:00	Scoring by quarter: 35–24, 23–29, 19–34, 25–21
10 Peach	Pts: Lamb 27; Rebs: Lamb 8 Asts: Jackson-Cartwright 9	boxscore report	Pts: Cotton 31; Rebs: H.Harris 8 Asts: T.Webster 6	Attendance: 6,280

7 January 2024	Sydney Kings	93–101	Brisbane Bullets	Sydney SuperDome, Sydney
16:00	Scoring by quarter: 24–23, 15–29, 28–28, 26–21
10 Peach	Pts: Adams 21; Rebs: Hunter 10; Asts: Adams 8	boxscore report	Pts: Sobey 27; Rebs: Bannan 9 Asts: Norton 5	Attendance: 13,078

=== Round 15 ===
10 January 2024	Brisbane Bullets	80–77	Tasmania JackJumpers	Nissan Arena, Brisbane
18:30	Scoring by quarter: 19–18, 24–20, 18–21, 19–18
ESPN	Pts: Smith 19; Rebs: three players 7 Asts: Scott 5	boxscore report	Pts: Doyle 19; Rebs: Lee 7 Asts: Doyle 3	Attendance: 4,486

11 January 2024	Adelaide 36ers	95–82	Sydney Kings	Adelaide Entertainment Centre, Adelaide
19:00	Scoring by quarter: 20–19, 22–8, 28–27, 25–28
ESPN	Pts: Kell 27; Rebs: Humphries 12; Asts: Vasiljevic 8	boxscore report	Pts: Adams 20; Rebs: Hunter 9 Asts: Adams 4	Attendance: 9,580

12 January 2024	New Zealand Breakers	81–82	Melbourne United	TSB Stadium, New Plymouth
19:30	Scoring by quarter: 22–17, 22–22, 18–23, 19–20
Sky Sport	Pts: Lamb 22; Rebs: Cheatham 10; Asts: Jackson-Cartwright 5	boxscore report	Pts: Goulding 24; Rebs: Travers 11; Asts: Dellavedova 10	Attendance: 2,632

12 January 2024	Tasmania JackJumpers	107–108(2OT)	Illawarra Hawks	Derwent Entertainment Centre, Hobart
19:30	Scoring by quarter: 20–18, 15–18, 15–20, 36–30, Overtime: 13–13, 8–9
ESPN	Pts: Crawford 24; Rebs: Macdonald 9 Asts: Doyle 6	boxscore report	Pts: Clark 25; Rebs: Clark 15; Asts: Robinson 5	Attendance: 4,340

13 January 2024	Cairns Taipans	111–101(OT)	Adelaide 36ers	Cairns Convention Centre, Cairns
16:30	Scoring by quarter: 27–28, 26–28, 19–26, 22–12, Overtime: 17–7
ESPN	Pts: McCall 30; Rebs: Gak 14; Asts: McCall 9	boxscore report	Pts: Humphries 28; Rebs: Humphries 11; Asts: Kell 3	Attendance: 4,659

13 January 2024	Perth Wildcats	100–79	S.E. Melbourne Phoenix	Perth Arena, Perth
17:00	Scoring by quarter: 28–19, 28–20, 14–22, 30–18
ESPN	Pts: Cotton 34; Rebs: four players 6 Asts: T.Webster 4	boxscore report	Pts: Creek 36; Rebs: Gak 11; Asts: Ayre 4	Attendance: 12,859

14 January 2024	Brisbane Bullets	110–103	Illawarra Hawks	Nissan Arena, Brisbane
13:00	Scoring by quarter: 30–26, 29–30, 31–24, 20–23
10 Peach	Pts: Sobey 25; Rebs: Harrison 7 Asts: Scott 6	boxscore report	Pts: Harvey 29; Rebs: Clark 8 Asts: Clark, Robinson 3	Attendance: 5,200

14 January 2024	Sydney Kings	105–76	New Zealand Breakers	Sydney SuperDome, Sydney
16:00	Scoring by quarter: 34–19, 29–15, 26–20, 16–22
10 Peach	Pts: Adams 39; Rebs: Hunter 10; Asts: Valentine 5	boxscore report	Pts: Le'afa 15; Rebs: Mathiang 5 Asts: Lamb 5	Attendance: 16,605

=== Round 16 ===
17 January 2024	S.E. Melbourne Phoenix	85–110	Adelaide 36ers	State Basketball Centre, Melbourne
19:30	Scoring by quarter: 23–34, 17–34, 20–19, 25–23
ESPN	Pts: Nader 18; Rebs: Gak 8 Asts: Ayre, Foxwell 3	boxscore report	Pts: Humphries 25; Rebs: three players 7 Asts: three players 4	Attendance: 3,422

18 January 2024	Illawarra Hawks	92–93	Cairns Taipans	Wollongong Entertainment Centre, Wollongong
19:30	Scoring by quarter: 23–19, 17–25, 23–23, 29–26
ESPN	Pts: Clark 36; Rebs: Froling 11; Asts: Harvey 6	boxscore report	Pts: McCall 28; Rebs: Gak 11; Asts: Armstrong, McCall 6	Attendance: 3,711

19 January 2024	Tasmania JackJumpers	107–86	Melbourne United	Derwent Entertainment Centre, Hobart
19:30	Scoring by quarter: 24–22, 30–22, 25–14, 28–28
ESPN	Pts: Crawford 25; Rebs: Lee 10; Asts: Doyle 6	boxscore report	Pts: Goulding 16; Rebs: Hukporti 8 Asts: Dellavedova 8	Attendance: 4,340

19 January 2024	Perth Wildcats	118–86	Brisbane Bullets	Perth Arena, Perth
18:30	Scoring by quarter: 31–13, 26–25, 28–23, 33–25
ESPN	Pts: Cotton 28; Rebs: H.Harris 11; Asts: Cotton 7	boxscore report	Pts: Harrison 16; Rebs: Harrison 9 Asts: Scott 4	Attendance: 12,836

20 January 2024	New Zealand Breakers	106–75	S.E. Melbourne Phoenix	Spark Arena, Auckland
19:30	Scoring by quarter: 25–10, 27–27, 25–26, 29–12
Sky Sport	Pts: Lamb 31; Rebs: Mathiang 9 Asts: Jackson-Cartwright, McDowell-White 7	boxscore report	Pts: Creek 27; Rebs: Creek 7 Asts: Ayre, Te Rangi 4	Attendance: 4,940

20 January 2024	Illawarra Hawks	89–96	Adelaide 36ers	Wollongong Entertainment Centre, Wollongong
20:00	Scoring by quarter: 15–21, 24–21, 23–26, 27–28
ESPN	Pts: Lee 24; Rebs: Froling 10; Asts: Harvey 4	boxscore report	Pts: Kell 26; Rebs: Humphries 10; Asts: Marshall 3	Attendance: 3,555

21 January 2024	Sydney Kings	98–104	Perth Wildcats	Sydney SuperDome, Sydney
14:00	Scoring by quarter: 20–34, 37–24, 21–22, 20–24
10 Peach	Pts: Adams 29; Rebs: Hunter, Noi 12; Asts: Valentine 8	boxscore report	Pts: Cotton 29; Rebs: Doolittle 7 Asts: Usher, T.Webster 5	Attendance: 13,138

21 January 2024	Cairns Taipans	84–102	Brisbane Bullets	Cairns Convention Centre, Cairns
15:00	Scoring by quarter: 17–26, 23–35, 22–18, 22–23
10 Peach	Pts: Kuol 19; Rebs: McCall 6 Asts: Miller 5	boxscore report	Pts: Sobey 18; Rebs: Harrison 13; Asts: Sobey 5	Attendance: 4,601

=== Round 17 ===
25 January 2024	S.E. Melbourne Phoenix	104–98	Sydney Kings	State Basketball Centre, Melbourne
19:30	Scoring by quarter: 36–27, 25–27, 21–14, 22–30
ESPN	Pts: Creek 31; Rebs: Creek 10; Asts: Foxwell 6	boxscore report	Pts: Adams 24; Rebs: Galloway, Valentine 5 Asts: Adams 9	Attendance: 3,422

25 January 2024	Perth Wildcats	77–95	Illawarra Hawks	Perth Arena, Perth
18:30	Scoring by quarter: 21–28, 14–27, 20–16, 22–24
ESPN	Pts: T.Webster 16; Rebs: Doolittle 10; Asts: Cotton 3	boxscore report	Pts: Clark 17; Rebs: Olbrich 7 Asts: Harvey, Robinson 4	Attendance: 12,771

26 January 2024	New Zealand Breakers	94–88	Tasmania JackJumpers	North Shore Events Centre, Auckland
19:30	Scoring by quarter: 24–20, 33–19, 12–21, 25–28
Sky Sport	Pts: Jackson-Cartwright 25; Rebs: Cheatham, Mathiang 5 Asts: Lamb 5	boxscore report	Pts: McVeigh 22; Rebs: Magnay 8 Asts: Macdonald 6	Attendance: 2,272

26 January 2024	Brisbane Bullets	77–93	Melbourne United	Nissan Arena, Brisbane
18:30	Scoring by quarter: 13–21, 26–29, 20–23, 18–20
ESPN	Pts: Sobey 19; Rebs: Harrison 8 Asts: Prather, Sobey 3	boxscore report	Pts: Lual-Acuil 33; Rebs: Lual-Acuil 13; Asts: Ili 6	Attendance: 5,291

27 January 2024	Adelaide 36ers	88–71	Cairns Taipans	Adelaide Entertainment Centre, Adelaide
17:00	Scoring by quarter: 28–25, 25–13, 22–15, 13–18
ESPN	Pts: Vasiljevic 28; Rebs: Galloway 8 Asts: three players 3	boxscore report	Pts: Mayen 15; Rebs: Mayen 9 Asts: McCall 7	Attendance: 9,471

27 January 2024	S.E. Melbourne Phoenix	91–103	Perth Wildcats	State Basketball Centre, Melbourne
20:00	Scoring by quarter: 17–29, 29–30, 23–20, 22–24
ESPN	Pts: Creek 29; Rebs: Gak 8 Asts: Ayre 8	boxscore report	Pts: T.Webster 23; Rebs: Pinder 11; Asts: Cotton 8	Attendance: 3,422

28 January 2024	Illawarra Hawks	89–85	New Zealand Breakers	Wollongong Entertainment Centre, Wollongong
14:00	Scoring by quarter: 22–22, 20–26, 22–20, 25–17
10 Peach	Pts: Clark 29; Rebs: Clark 8 Asts: Froling, Robinson 4	boxscore report	Pts: Cheatham 19; Rebs: Cheatham 11; Asts: Lamb 4	Attendance: 4,239

28 January 2024	Sydney Kings	98–86	Melbourne United	Sydney SuperDome, Sydney
16:00	Scoring by quarter: 22–26, 36–17, 14–22, 26–21
10 Peach	Pts: Maluach 18; Rebs: Hunter 9 Asts: Valentine 9	boxscore report	Pts: Travers 15; Rebs: Travers 10; Asts: Dellavedova 6	Attendance: 12,921

=== Round 18 ===
1 February 2024	Cairns Taipans	86–94	Tasmania JackJumpers	Cairns Convention Centre, Cairns
18:30	Scoring by quarter: 22–22, 22–23, 18–27, 24–22
ESPN	Pts: Miller 31; Rebs: Miller 7 Asts: Armstrong 6	boxscore report	Pts: Crawford 25; Rebs: Doyle 10; Asts: Doyle 7	Attendance: 3,645

2 February 2024	Adelaide 36ers	85–78	Sydney Kings	Adelaide Entertainment Centre, Adelaide
19:00	Scoring by quarter: 17–18, 20–23, 17–18, 31–19
ESPN	Pts: Humphries, Vasiljevic 20; Rebs: Humphries 11; Asts: Kell 7	boxscore report	Pts: Adams 21; Rebs: Valentine 9 Asts: Adams, Valentine 5	Attendance: 9,434

3 February 2024	Illawarra Hawks	89–76	Brisbane Bullets	Wollongong Entertainment Centre, Wollongong
17:30	Scoring by quarter: 22–18, 28–26, 12–22, 27–10
ESPN	Pts: Clark 19; Rebs: Clark 10; Asts: Robinson 5	boxscore report	Pts: three players 11; Rebs: Bannan, Harrison 8 Asts: six players 2	Attendance: 4,991

3 February 2024	Melbourne United	99–83	S.E. Melbourne Phoenix	John Cain Arena, Melbourne
20:00	Scoring by quarter: 26–17, 31–27, 31–15, 11–24
ESPN	Pts: Lual-Acuil 16; Rebs: Hukporti 10; Asts: Dellavedova 8	boxscore report	Pts: Nader 18; Rebs: Gak 11; Asts: Ayre 9	Attendance: 10,175

4 February 2024	Tasmania JackJumpers	109–86	Adelaide 36ers	Derwent Entertainment Centre, Hobart
14:00	Scoring by quarter: 31–21, 26–24, 26–24, 26–17
10 Peach	Pts: McVeigh 26; Rebs: Magnay 12; Asts: Doyle 10	boxscore report	Pts: Kell 29; Rebs: Kell 10; Asts: Marshall 4	Attendance: 4,340

4 February 2024	Perth Wildcats	78–89	New Zealand Breakers	Perth Arena, Perth
13:00	Scoring by quarter: 16–21, 23–25, 24–23, 15–18
10 Peach	Pts: Pinder 21; Rebs: Pinder 15; Asts: Cotton 6	boxscore report	Pts: Cheatham 24; Rebs: Mathiang 9 Asts: Jackson-Cartwright, Le'afa 5	Attendance: 12,975

=== Round 19 ===
9 February 2024	New Zealand Breakers	88–85	Illawarra Hawks	Spark Arena, Auckland
19:30	Scoring by quarter: 18–21, 23–21, 27–19, 20–24
Sky Sport	Pts: Jackson-Cartwright 31; Rebs: Cheatham 15; Asts: Jackson-Cartwright 7	boxscore report	Pts: Harvey 22; Rebs: Froling 10; Asts: Robinson 4	Attendance: 3,941

9 February 2024	Brisbane Bullets	102–84	Adelaide 36ers	Nissan Arena, Brisbane
18:30	Scoring by quarter: 22–20, 30–24, 24–23, 26–17
ESPN	Pts: Sobey 37; Rebs: Bannan 11; Asts: Norton 6	boxscore report	Pts: Vasiljevic 28; Rebs: Kell 10; Asts: McCarron 4	Attendance: 4,987

10 February 2024	S.E. Melbourne Phoenix	67–94	Tasmania JackJumpers	John Cain Arena, Melbourne
17:30	Scoring by quarter: 19–24, 11–25, 14–25, 23–20
ESPN	Pts: Nader 19; Rebs: Gak 7 Asts: Ayre, Nader 3	boxscore report	Pts: four players 11; Rebs: Lee 7 Asts: Doyle 5	Attendance: 10,175

10 February 2024	Perth Wildcats	117–88	Cairns Taipans	Perth Arena, Perth
17:00	Scoring by quarter: 30–30, 27–27, 22–15, 38–16
ESPN	Pts: Cotton 26; Rebs: Sarr 12; Asts: Cotton 4	boxscore report	Pts: Miller 25; Rebs: three players 4 Asts: Miller 5	Attendance: 12,895

11 February 2024	Melbourne United	94–81	New Zealand Breakers	John Cain Arena, Melbourne
14:00	Scoring by quarter: 27–22, 28–17, 23–16, 16–26
10 Peach	Pts: Lual-Acuil 19; Rebs: Lual-Acuil 11; Asts: Ili 5	boxscore report	Pts: Jackson-Cartwright 24; Rebs: Cheatham 12; Asts: Jackson-Cartwright 5	Attendance: 10,175

11 February 2024	Sydney Kings	95–106	Illawarra Hawks	Sydney SuperDome, Sydney
16:00	Scoring by quarter: 17–31, 29–28, 19–20, 30–27
10 Peach	Pts: Valentine 21; Rebs: Hogg 8 Asts: Adams 7	boxscore report	Pts: Clark 22; Rebs: Froling 11; Asts: Harvey, Robinson 6	Attendance: 14,832

=== Round 20 ===
15 February 2024	Illawarra Hawks	108–92	Perth Wildcats	Wollongong Entertainment Centre, Wollongong
19:30	Scoring by quarter: 24–26, 32–24, 28–21, 24–21
ESPN	Pts: Clark 25; Rebs: Clark 11; Asts: Robinson 5	boxscore report	Pts: Cotton 20; Rebs: H.Harris 7 Asts: T.Webster 5	Attendance: 4,486

16 February 2024	New Zealand Breakers	103–87	Brisbane Bullets	Spark Arena, Auckland
19:30	Scoring by quarter: 26–21, 29–19, 20–23, 28–24
Sky Sport	Pts: Jackson-Cartwright 27; Rebs: McDowell-White 7 Asts: Jackson-Cartwright 8	boxscore report	Pts: Bannan 29; Rebs: Harrison 6 Asts: Sobey 6	Attendance: 6,085

16 February 2024	Cairns Taipans	97–88	Melbourne United	Cairns Convention Centre, Cairns
18:30	Scoring by quarter: 28–15, 29–20, 20–19, 20–34
ESPN	Pts: McCall 23; Rebs: McCall 9 Asts: McCall 10	boxscore report	Pts: Clark 20; Rebs: Travers 13; Asts: Dellavedova 5	Attendance: 4,378

17 February 2024	S.E. Melbourne Phoenix	67–122	Sydney Kings	John Cain Arena, Melbourne
17:30	Scoring by quarter: 14–34, 25–29, 17–29, 11–30
ESPN	Pts: Foxwell 16; Rebs: Stattmann 5 Asts: three players 3	boxscore report	Pts: Hogg 25; Rebs: Valentine 8 Asts: Adams 9	Attendance: 8,279

17 February 2024	Tasmania JackJumpers	86–72	Perth Wildcats	Derwent Entertainment Centre, Hobart
20:00	Scoring by quarter: 22–22, 25–10, 17–16, 22–24
ESPN	Pts: Doyle 24; Rebs: McVeigh 10; Asts: Doyle 5	boxscore report	Pts: Sarr 17; Rebs: Doolittle 5 Asts: Henshall, Usher 3	Attendance: 4,340

18 February 2024	Melbourne United	92–87	Illawarra Hawks	John Cain Arena, Melbourne
14:00	Scoring by quarter: 23–17, 15–25, 30–24, 24–21
10 Peach	Pts: Goulding 19; Rebs: Hukporti, Lual-Acuil 5 Asts: Dellavedova 5	boxscore report	Pts: Robinson 14; Rebs: Froling 9 Asts: Froling, Robinson 5	Attendance: 10,175

18 February 2024	Adelaide 36ers	76–70	New Zealand Breakers	Adelaide Entertainment Centre, Adelaide
15:30	Scoring by quarter: 17–14, 20–21, 21–12, 18–23
10 Peach	Pts: Vasiljevic 25; Rebs: Vasiljevic 14; Asts: McCarron 6	boxscore report	Pts: Jackson-Cartwright 24; Rebs: Cheatham 13; Asts: Cheatham 4	Attendance: 9,513

== Ladder ==
Pos	2023–24 NBL season											
Pos	Team	Pld	W	L	PCT	Last 5	Streak	Home	Away	PF	PA	PP
1	Melbourne United	28	20	8	71.43%	3–2	W1	11–3	9–5	2615	2454	106.56%
2	Perth Wildcats	28	17	11	60.71%	2–3	L2	10–4	7–7	2630	2563	102.61%
3	Tasmania JackJumpers	28	16	12	57.14%	4–1	W4	8–6	8–6	2564	2378	107.82%
4	Illawarra Hawks	28	14	14	50.00%	3–2	L1	8–6	6–8	2547	2518	101.15%
5	Sydney Kings	28	13	15	46.43%	2–3	W1	7–7	6–8	2672	2602	102.69%
6	New Zealand Breakers	28	13	15	46.43%	3–2	L1	8–6	5–9	2498	2480	100.73%
7	Brisbane Bullets	28	13	15	46.43%	2–3	L1	8–6	5–9	2458	2534	97.00%
8	Cairns Taipans	28	12	16	42.86%	1–4	W1	7–7	5–9	2506	2589	96.79%
9	Adelaide 36ers	28	12	16	42.86%	3–2	W1	9–5	3–11	2457	2563	95.86%
10	S.E. Melbourne Phoenix	28	10	18	35.71%	1–4	L4	7–7	3–11	2425	2691	90.12%

Updated to match(es) played on 18 February 2024. Source: NBL.com.au

The NBL tie-breaker system as outlined in the NBL Rules and Regulations states that in the case of an identical win–loss record, the overall points percentage will determine order of seeding.

=== Ladder progression ===
Leader and qualification to semifinals
Qualification to semifinals
Qualification to play-in games
Last place

2023–24 NBL season
Team ╲ Round	1	2	3	4	5	6	7	8	9	10	11	12	13	14	15	16	17	18	19	20
Adelaide 36ers	9	10	10	9	7	8	8	8	9	10	10	10	10	10	10	9	9	9	9	9
Brisbane Bullets	1	2	6	7	6	5	7	6	6	6	7	9	9	6	5	4	5	6	5	7
Cairns Taipans	8	6	3	4	3	7	6	7	7	7	6	6	7	9	7	6	7	8	8	8
Illawarra Hawks	10	8	9	10	9	10	10	10	10	8	8	8	8	5	6	8	6	4	4	4
Melbourne United	3	1	1	1	1	1	1	1	1	1	1	1	1	1	1	1	1	1	1	1
New Zealand Breakers	4	7	5	6	10	9	9	9	8	9	9	7	6	8	9	7	8	7	6	6
Perth Wildcats	6	5	8	8	8	6	5	4	3	5	3	2	2	2	2	2	2	2	2	2
S.E. Melbourne Phoenix	5	9	7	5	2	3	4	5	5	3	5	5	5	7	8	10	10	10	10	10
Sydney Kings	2	3	2	3	4	2	2	2	4	4	2	4	3	4	4	5	4	5	7	5
Tasmania JackJumpers	7	4	4	2	5	4	3	3	2	2	4	3	4	3	3	3	3	3	3	3

Updated to match(es) played on 18 February 2024. Source: NBL.com.au

== Finals ==
The 2024 NBL Finals were played in February and March 2024, consisting of three play-in games, two best-of-three semifinal series and the best-of-five Championship Series. In the semifinals, the higher seed hosts the first and third games. In the Championship Series, the higher seed hosts the first, third and fifth games.

The top two seeds in the regular season will automatically qualify to the semifinals. Teams ranked three to six will compete in the play-in tournament. The third seed will play the fourth seed for third spot and the loser will play the winner of fifth or sixth for the fourth seed.

=== Playoff bracket ===
Play-in / Seeding qualifier
5	Sydney Kings	76
6	New Zealand Breakers	83
3	Tasmania JackJumpers	92
4	Illawarra Hawks	76

Play-in game
4	Illawarra Hawks	88
6	New Zealand Breakers	85

Semifinals
1	Melbourne United	115	108	100
4	Illawarra Hawks	106	113	94
2	Perth Wildcats	89	94	84
3	Tasmania JackJumpers	81	102	100

Championship
1	Melbourne United	104	77	91	88	81
3	Tasmania JackJumpers	81	82	93	86	83

== Awards ==
=== Pre-season ===
- Loggins-Bruton Cup: Melbourne United
- Most Valuable Player (Ray Borner Medal): Tyler Cook (S.E. Melbourne Phoenix)

=== Regular season ===
==== Awards Night ====
- Most Valuable Player (Andrew Gaze Trophy): Bryce Cotton (Perth Wildcats)
- Next Generation Award: Sam Froling (Illawarra Hawks)
- Best Defensive Player (Damian Martin Trophy): Shea Ili (Melbourne United)
- Best Sixth Man: Ian Clark (Melbourne United)
- Most Improved Player: Sean Macdonald (Tasmania JackJumpers)
- Fans MVP: Bryce Cotton (Perth Wildcats)
- Coach of the Year (Lindsay Gaze Trophy): Dean Vickerman (Melbourne United)
- Executive of the Year: Nick Truelson (Melbourne United)
- Referee of the Year: Vaughn Mayberry
- GameTime by Kmart: Sunday Dech (Adelaide 36ers)
- All-NBL First Team:
  - Bryce Cotton (Perth Wildcats)
  - Chris Goulding (Melbourne United)
  - Gary Clark (Illawarra Hawks)
  - Anthony Lamb (New Zealand Breakers)
  - Parker Jackson-Cartwright (New Zealand Breakers)
- All-NBL Second Team:
  - Mitch Creek (S.E. Melbourne Phoenix)
  - Nathan Sobey (Brisbane Bullets)
  - Jo Lual-Acuil (Melbourne United)
  - Milton Doyle (Tasmania JackJumpers)
  - Jack McVeigh (Tasmania JackJumpers)

=== Postseason ===
- Championship Series MVP (Larry Sengstock Medal): Jack McVeigh (Tasmania JackJumpers)
- NBL Champions: Tasmania JackJumpers
