= Josh Bannan =

Australian basketball player (born 2001)

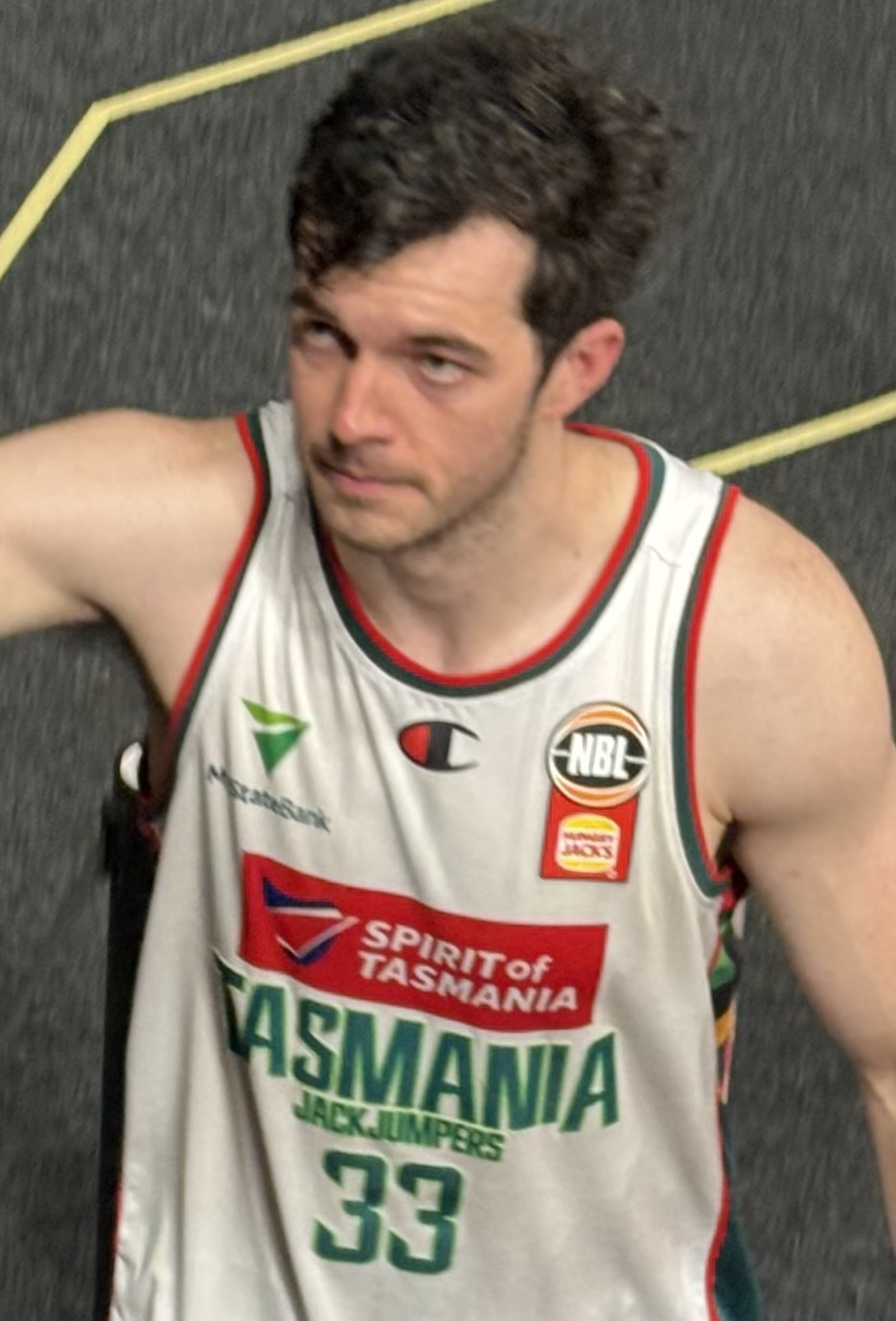
- Bannan with the Tasmania JackJumpers in 2025

No. 33 – Tasmania JackJumpers
- Position: Power forward
- League: NBL

Personal information
- Born: 26 February 2001 (age 25) Melbourne, Victoria, Australia
- Listed height: 208 cm (6 ft 10 in)
- Listed weight: 100 kg (220 lb)

Career information
- High school: St Kevin's College (Melbourne, Victoria); Lake Ginninderra (Canberra, ACT)
- College: Montana (2020–2023)
- NBA draft: 2024: undrafted
- Playing career: 2019–present

Career history
- 2019–2020: BA Centre of Excellence
- 2023–2025: Brisbane Bullets
- 2025: Limoges CSP
- 2025–present: Tasmania JackJumpers
- 2026: Pallacanestro Trieste

Career highlights
- First-team All-Big Sky (2023); Second-team All-Big Sky (2022)
Medals
Men's basketball
Representing Australia
FIBA Asia Cup
Gold medal – first place	2025 Saudi Arabia

Joshua Bannan (born 26 February 2001) is an Australian professional basketball player for the Tasmania JackJumpers of the National Basketball League (NBL). He played college basketball in the United States for Montana before debuting in the NBL for the Brisbane Bullets in 2023.

== Early life and career ==
Bannan was born and raised in Melbourne, Victoria. He attended St Kevin's College and played as a junior for the Blackburn Vikings.

In 2019, Bannan played for the BA Centre of Excellence in the NBL1 during the league's inaugural season. The following year, he had a brief stint with the Centre of Excellence in the Waratah League. While in Canberra, he attended Lake Ginninderra Secondary College.

== College career ==
Between 2020 and 2023, Bannan played three seasons of college basketball in the United States for the Montana Grizzlies. Over his college career, he averaged 13.1 points and 7.6 rebounds per game. In the 2022–23 season, he averaged 15.0 points and 8.5 rebounds per game while shooting 49.9 percent from the field and 40.4 percent from beyond the arc.

== Professional career ==
On 6 April 2023, Bannan signed a three-year deal with the Brisbane Bullets of the National Basketball League (NBL). In 19 games in the 2023–24 season, he averaged 11.9 points and 7.2 rebounds per game.

Bannan entered the 2024 NBA draft but went undrafted. He subsequently joined the Los Angeles Clippers for the 2024 NBA Summer League.

Bannan missed the first two games of the 2024–25 NBL season with a hand injury. He sustained an ankle injury during the FIBA break, which sidelined him in late November. For the season, he averaged 13.2 points and 8.6 rebounds per game. He became a free agent following the season after declining his player option.

On 18 March 2025, Bannan signed with Limoges CSP of the French LNB Élite for the rest of the 2024–25 season.

On 11 April 2025, Bannan signed a two-year deal with the Tasmania JackJumpers. He was named the JackJumpers Club MVP. Following the 2025–26 NBL season, he joined Pallacanestro Trieste of the Lega Basket Serie A (LBA) for the rest of the 2025–26 LBA season.

Bannan was named the JackJumpers' vice captain alongside Taran Armstrong for the 2026–27 NBL season.

== National team career ==
Bannan played for the Australia U17 national team at the 2018 FIBA Under-17 Basketball World Cup in Argentina.

In February 2024, Bannan debuted for the Australian Boomers during the 2025 FIBA Asia Cup qualifiers, scoring 11 points against South Korea. In November 2024, he was named in the Boomers squad for the next FIBA Asia Cup qualifiers window.

In July 2025, Bannan was named in the Boomers squad in the lead up to the 2025 FIBA Asia Cup in Saudi Arabia. He did not make the final Asia Cup squad.

In October 2025, Bannan was named in the Boomers squad for the first window of the FIBA Basketball World Cup 2027 Asian Qualifiers. In June 2026, he was named in the squad for two more Asian qualifiers in Perth in July. In August 2026, he was named in the squad for two more Asian qualifiers. In November 2026, he was named in the squad for two more Asian qualifiers.
