= Bul Kuol =

Australian basketball player

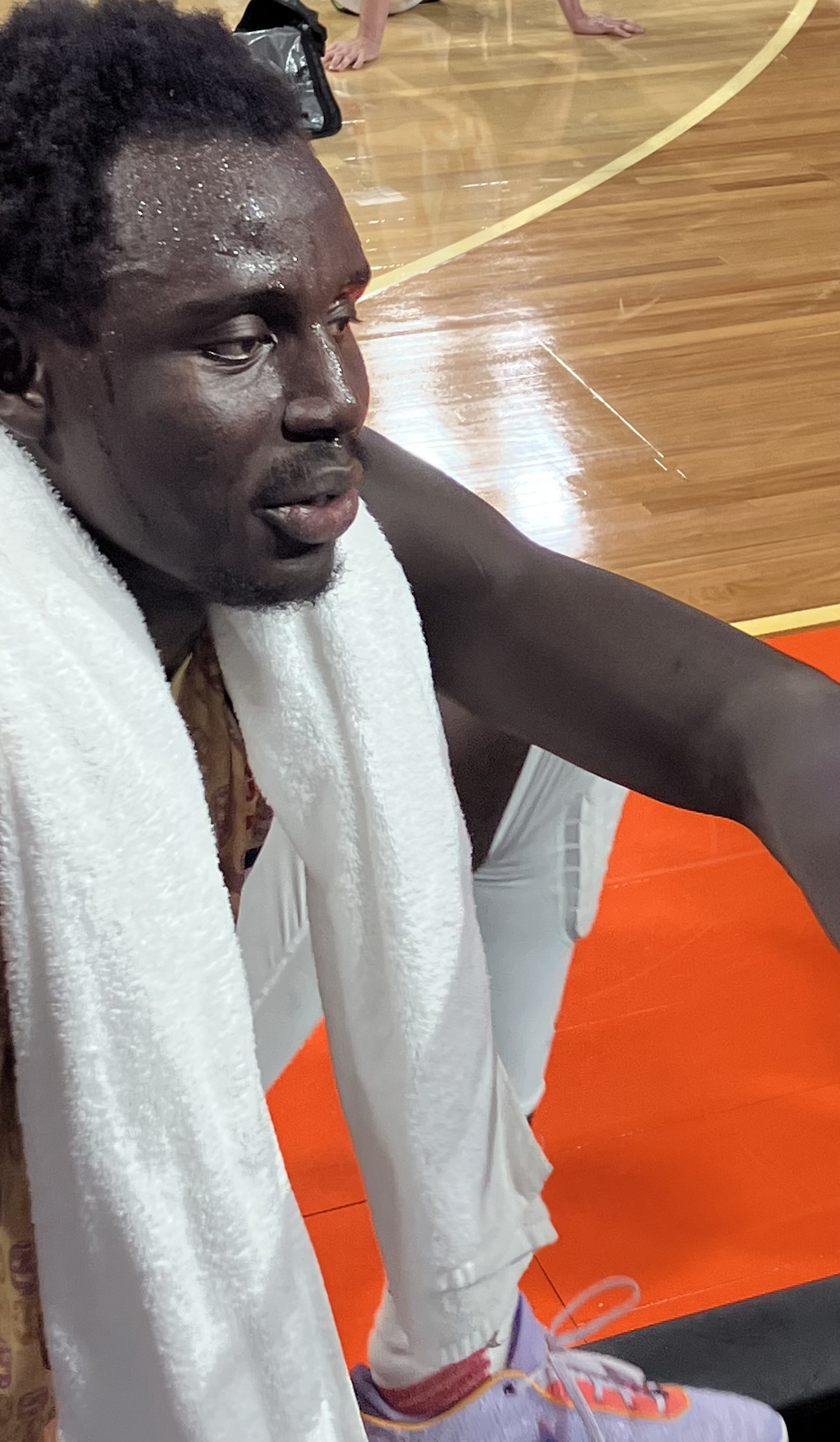
- Kuol with the Cairns Taipans in 2022

No. 42 – Adelaide 36ers
- Position: Shooting guard / small forward
- League: NBL

Personal information
- Born: 10 January 1997 (age 29) Sudan
- Listed height: 201 cm (6 ft 7 in)
- Listed weight: 94 kg (207 lb)

Career information
- High school: Lake Ginninderra (Canberra, ACT)
- College: California Baptist (2016–2020); Detroit Mercy (2020–2021)
- NBA draft: 2022: undrafted
- Playing career: 2015–present

Career history
- 2015–2016: Canberra Gunners
- 2021: Knox Raiders
- 2021–2024: Cairns Taipans
- 2023: Le Mans
- 2024–2026: Sydney Kings
- 2026–present: Adelaide 36ers

Career highlights
- NBL champion (2026); NBL Rookie of the Year (2022); Third-team All-Horizon League (2021)

Bul Kuol (born 10 January 1997) is a South Sudanese-Australian professional basketball player for the Adelaide 36ers of the National Basketball League (NBL). Born in Sudan, he moved to Australia when he was nine years old and grew up in Canberra. He played college basketball in the United States for five years, four at California Baptist and one at Detroit Mercy. He joined the Cairns Taipans of the NBL in 2021 and played three seasons for the club. In 2023, he had a stint with Le Mans of the French Pro A. He joined the Sydney Kings in 2024 and went on to win an NBL championship in 2026.

== Early life and career ==
Born in Sudan, Kuol grew up in a small village next to a military base that backed on to the jungle. He and his family also spent time living at Kakuma, the world's biggest refugee camp located in Kenya. He moved to Australia in 2006 when he was nine years old, when his uncle, mother, three brothers and two sisters fled from war-torn South Sudan. Kuol's father stayed in Africa to look after the rest of their family.

Living in Canberra, Kuol took up basketball as a 13-year-old after a growth spurt forced him to give soccer away. He attended Lake Ginninderra Secondary College and led the school to back-to-back Australian Schools Championships. He also led the Australian Capital Territory (ACT) team to a fifth-place finish at the U20 National Championships, averaging 15.6 points and 8.1 rebounds per game.

Kuol debuted in the South East Australian Basketball League (SEABL) for the Canberra Gunners in 2015, averaging 6.0 points and 1.6 rebounds in 18 games. The following year, he averaged 8.6 points, 3.7 rebounds and 1.5 assists in 22 games for the Gunners.

== College career ==
As a freshman at California Baptist in 2016–17, Kuol played in all 31 games and averaged 3.0 points and 2.2 rebounds in 14.0 minutes per game.

As a sophomore in 2017–18, Kuol played in all 34 games for the Lancers with 32 starts and averaged 6.7 points and 4.0 rebounds per game. He earned Academic All-PacWest honours.

In the 2018–19 season, Kuol played in 10 games to begin the season – California Baptist's first season in Division I – and then did not play again after 17 December due to a back injury. He made seven starts and averaged 6.3 points per game.

Kuol was considered a redshirt junior in the 2019–20 season, playing in 16 games for the Lancers from 2 January onwards. He averaged 5.6 points and 3.1 rebounds in 18.4 minutes per game.

After graduating from California Baptist, Kuol transferred to Detroit Mercy in May 2020.

In the 2020–21 season with the Titans, Kuol finished 13th in the Horizon League in regular-season scoring with 15.5 points per game, including 16.4 points in conference games. He scored in double digits 17 times in his 20 regular-season games with four 20-point outings and was subsequently named third-team All-Horizon League. On 26 December 2020, he scored a career-high 28 points in a 77–75 overtime loss to Oakland. On 5 February 2021, he set a new career high with 29 points in an 82–72 win over Purdue Fort Wayne. He scored a team-high 20 points against NKU in the quarterfinals of the Horizon League tournament. He started all 22 games for the season and averaged 15.6 points, 4.8 rebounds, 2.0 assists and 1.3 steals.

== Professional career ==
In April 2021, Kuol joined the Knox Raiders of the NBL1 South. In nine games, he averaged 18.2 points and 4.9 rebounds per game.

On 13 August 2021, Kuol signed a two-year deal with the Cairns Taipans of the National Basketball League. He entered the 2021–22 season having been told he was not guaranteed to be part of the rotation or receive any minutes, but due to numerous injuries to his back-court teammates, he was thrust into the line-up and quickly became one of the Taipans' most important players thanks to his defensive intensity and energy. He subsequently put himself in the Rookie of the Year discussion. On 5 February 2022, he scored 26 points with eight 3-pointers in a 102–94 win over the Brisbane Bullets, becoming just the third player in Taipans history to record eight 3-pointers in a game. For the season, his 64 3-pointers set an NBL record for most 3-pointers by an Australian rookie and he became the first rookie in NBL history to finish inside the Top 5 for 3-pointers in a season. He also finished the season with a team-high 26 starts and recorded the team's second-most minutes played over the season. He was subsequently named the NBL Rookie of the Year.

On 16 May 2022, Kuol recommitted to the Taipans for the 2022–23 season. He averaged 10.3 points and 3.7 rebounds per game.

On 28 February 2023, Kuol signed with Le Mans of the French Pro A for the rest of the 2022–23 season.

On 9 June 2023, Kuol re-signed with the Taipans for the 2023–24 NBL season. He averaged a career-best 12.7 points, 1.7 assists and 0.5 blocks per game, to go with 3.1 rebounds and 0.7 steals.

On 30 April 2024, Kuol signed a three-year deal with the Sydney Kings. He missed the month of December 2024 with a knee injury.

In the 2025–26 NBL season, Kuol re-established himself as one of the competition's top defenders while averaging career-high numbers in field goal percentage (51.7), three-point percentage (44), free-throw percentage (84.6), rebounds (4.2) and steals (1) across 20 games. On 6 January 2026, he was ruled out for the rest of the season with an ACL injury. The Kings went on to win the NBL championship. He became a free agent following the 2025–26 season.

On 20 April 2026, Kuol signed a two-year contract with the Adelaide 36ers.

== National team career ==
In 2022, Kuol was selected to play for the South Sudanese national team in the FIBA World Cup Qualifiers. He played for South Sudan in further qualifiers in February 2023.

Kuol missed the 2023 FIBA World Cup due to a wrist injury. He was named in South Sudan's final roster for the 2024 Olympics.
