= Sam Mennenga =

New Zealand basketball player (born 2001)

No. 3 – New Zealand Breakers
- Position: Power forward / Center
- League: NBL

Personal information
- Born: 12 December 2001 (age 24)
- Listed height: 206 cm (6 ft 9 in)
- Listed weight: 109 kg (240 lb)

Career information
- High school: Westlake Boys (Auckland, New Zealand)
- College: Davidson (2020–2023)
- NBA draft: 2024: undrafted
- Playing career: 2023–present

Career history
- 2023–2024: Cairns Taipans
- 2024: AS Karditsas
- 2024–present: New Zealand Breakers
- 2025: Atléticos de San Germán
- 2026: Xinjiang Flying Tigers

Career highlights
- NBL Ignite Cup winner (2026); NBL Next Generation Award (2026); Third-team All-Atlantic 10 (2023)
Medals
Men's basketball
Representing New Zealand
FIBA Asia Cup
Bronze medal – third place	2022 Jakarta

Samuel Jan Mennenga (born 12 December 2001) is a New Zealand professional basketball player for the New Zealand Breakers of the Australian National Basketball League (NBL). He played three seasons of college basketball in the United States for the Davidson Wildcats before debuting in the NBL for the Cairns Taipans in 2023. He joined the Breakers in 2024.

== Early life ==
Mennenga grew up north of Auckland in Matakana, where he started focusing on basketball at age 14. He played for North Harbour Basketball and attended Westlake Boys High School. In 2019, he was named to the Basketball Without Borders Global all-star team over NBA All-Star weekend in Charlotte and was selected to play for the NBA Academy Select team at the NBA Academy Games in Atlanta.

== College career ==
After receiving over 30 offers from a host of U.S. colleges, Mennenga accepted a scholarship with the Davidson Wildcats. He joined the team in January 2020 and then debuted in the 2020–21 season.

As a freshman in 2020–21, Mennenga started 20 of 21 games and finished second on the team in rebounding and scored in double figures five times. He averaged 6.0 points, 5.0 rebounds and 1.0 assists in 23.2 minutes per game. He scored a season-high 17 points against Texas in the Maui Invitational on 30 November 2020.

As a sophomore in 2021–22, Mennenga started 33 of the 34 games he played and scored in double figures 14 times, including four of the first five contests. He averaged 8.4 points, 5.3 rebounds and 1.5 assists in 25.7 minutes per game. He scored a season-high 18 points against Richmond in the Atlantic 10 title game on 13 March 2022. He had 15 points and five rebounds against Michigan State in the NCAA Tournament on 18 March.

As a junior in 2022–23, Mennenga served as team captain alongside Foster Loyer and Grant Huffman. Mennenga started all 32 games and averaged 15.2 points, 6.7 rebounds and 1.3 assists in 30.4 minutes per game. He scored 20 points or more eight times, including a season-high 27 points against La Salle on 24 January 2023. He was named to the third-team All-Atlantic 10.

Mennenga chose to forgo his senior year of college in order to turn professional.

== Professional career ==
On 6 April 2023, Mennenga signed a two-year deal with the Cairns Taipans of the Australian National Basketball League (NBL). He averaged 6.9 points and 3.9 rebounds across 27 games in the 2023–24 season. Following the NBL season, he joined Greek club AS Karditsas, where he averaged 7.3 points and 3.7 rebounds in nine games.

On 15 March 2024, Mennenga was granted a release from the second year of his contract by the Taipans in order for him to return home. His contract was bought out by the New Zealand Breakers, with the Breakers signing him on a two-year deal. On 16 January 2025, he scored a career-high 29 points in an 85–75 win over the Tasmania JackJumpers.

Mennenga joined Atléticos de San Germán of the Baloncesto Superior Nacional for the 2025 season. He averaged 14.5 points and 6.8 rebounds per game. He subsequently joined the Los Angeles Lakers for the 2025 NBA Summer League.

Mennenga returned to the Breakers for the 2025–26 NBL season. On 24 January 2026, he was ruled out for six to eight weeks after suffering a broken wrist the previous night in a loss to the Adelaide 36ers. After a quick recovery, he returned for the Breakers' final regular season game on 19 February, scoring a career-high 32 points in a 115–84 win over the Taipans. The Breakers finished outside the finals spots in seventh at the end of the regular season but won the inaugural NBL Ignite Cup Final, defeating the 36ers 111–107 behind Mennenga's 21 points.

Following the 2025–26 NBL season, Mennenga joined the Xinjiang Flying Tigers of the Chinese Basketball Association (CBA).

On 24 March 2026, Mennenga re-signed with the Breakers on a two-year deal. On 10 October 2026, he recorded 40 points and 18 rebounds in a 100–84 loss to the Perth Wildcats, becoming the first player in Breakers history to record 40 points and 18 rebounds in a game, the first player to achieve the feat in the NBL's 40-minute era, and the first NBL player to do so since 1996. On 18 October, he had 36 points and 11 rebounds in a 98–92 loss to the Tasmania JackJumpers. On 6 November, he had 29 points and 17 rebounds in a 79–77 loss to the JackJumpers.

== National team career ==
Mennenga represented the New Zealand Junior Tall Blacks at the 2018 FIBA Under-18 Asian Championship and 2019 FIBA Under-19 Basketball World Cup. He debuted for the New Zealand senior national team at the 2022 FIBA Asia Cup. He played for the Tall Blacks at the 2024 FIBA Olympic Qualifying Tournament in Greece.

In November 2025, Mennenga was named in the Tall Blacks squad for the first window of the FIBA Basketball World Cup 2027 Asian Qualifiers. In February 2026, he was named in the squad for two more Asian qualifiers. In June 2026, he was named in the squad for another two Asian qualifiers. In August 2026, he was named in the Tall Blacks squad for the next Asian qualifier window.

== Personal life ==
Mennenga is the son of Jens and Magdalena Mennenga. He is of German and Polish descent. He has two brothers, Lucas and Ben.
