= 2023 NBL pre-season =

Pre-season basketball tournament

2023 NBL Blitz logo

The pre-season of the 2023–24 NBL season, the 46th season of Australia's National Basketball League, will begin on 10 August to 16 October 2023.

The pre-season also featured the Cairns Taipans, New Zealand Breakers to play games between NBA teams, this will be the fifth NBLxNBA tour.

== Pre-season games ==
10 August 2023	Brisbane Bullets	75–48	California Baptist Lancers	UniSC Arena, Sunshine Coast
18:30	Scoring by quarter: 21–15, 16–10, 22–14, 16–9
NBL TV	Pts: Zikarsky 23; Rebs: Bannan 9 Asts: White 5	boxscore report	Pts: Coleman 10; Rebs: Goodrick 12; Asts: Washington 2	Attendance: n/a

12 August 2023	Melbourne United	87–59	California Baptist Lancers	Diamond Valley Sports Centre, Greensborough
19:30	Scoring by quarter: 20–17, 30–12, 17–16, 20–14
NBL TV	Pts: Krebs 22; Rebs: Bowen 9 Asts: Travers 7	boxscore report	Pts: Stevenson 14; Rebs: Goodrick 10; Asts: Stevenson 2	Attendance: n/a

13 August 2023	S.E. Melbourne Phoenix	87–62	California Baptist Lancers	State Basketball Centre, Wantirna South
12:00	Scoring by quarter: 27–15, 17–19, 25–10, 18–18
NBL TV	Pts: Browne 17; Rebs: Gak 9 Asts: Browne 7	boxscore report	Pts: Daniels 12; Rebs: Goodrick 16; Asts: Chiles 3	Attendance: n/a

25 August 2023	Perth Wildcats	111–93	NBL1 West	Rockingham Stadium, Rockingham
19:30	Scoring by quarter: 31–24, 36–30, 25–24, 19–15
NBL TV	Pts: Cotton, Usher 16; Rebs: Okwera 8 Asts: Cotton 4	boxscore report	Pts: Davis 19; Rebs: Jackson 7 Asts: Nelson 7	Attendance: n/a

26 August 2023	Brisbane Bullets	96–65	Cairns Taipans	Bundaberg Multiplex Sport Centre, Bundaberg
18:30	Scoring by quarter: 20–11, 22–25, 26–11, 28–18
NBL TV	Pts: Smith 25; Rebs: Baynes 7 Asts: White 11	boxscore report	Pts: Mennenga 15; Rebs: Gak 8 Asts: Mudronja 5	Attendance: n/a

27 August 2023	Perth Wildcats	99–86	NBL1 West	Warwick Stadium, Warwick
18:00	Scoring by quarter: 17–21, 30–20, 30–27, 22–18
NBL TV	Pts: Harris 23; Rebs: three players 9 Asts: Cotton 4	boxscore report	Pts: McKenzie 12; Rebs: McKenzie 5 Asts: Meunier 5	Attendance: n/a

28 August 2023	Tasmania JackJumpers	79–63	Melbourne United	Ulverstone Sports Centre, Ulverstone
18:30	Scoring by quarter: 31–16, 17–15, 17–14, 14–18
NBL TV	Pts: Macdonald 20; Rebs: Macdonald, Richards 6 Asts: Barker, Doyle 4	boxscore report	Pts: Blogg 18; Rebs: Hukporti 13; Asts: three players 2	Attendance: n/a

30 August 2023	Tasmania JackJumpers	89–78	Melbourne United	Elphin Sports Centre, Launceston
18:30	Scoring by quarter: 25–28, 27–16, 27–17, 10–17
NBL TV	Pts: Doyle 22; Rebs: Krslovic 7 Asts: Krslovic 5	boxscore report	Pts: Triplett 14; Rebs: Hukporti 10; Asts: Feagin 5	Attendance: n/a

1 September 2023	Adelaide 36ers	101–65	S.E. Melbourne Phoenix	Wulanda Convention Centre, Mount Gambier
19:30	Scoring by quarter: 27–20, 34–15, 16–19, 24–11
NBL TV	Pts: Franklin, Kell 14; Rebs: Starling 8 Asts: McCarron 4	boxscore report	Pts: Creek, Cummings 12; Rebs: Rosendale, Vauge 5 Asts: Foxwell 3	Attendance: 2,500

3 September 2023	Illawarra Hawks	85–74	New Zealand Breakers	Beaton Park Stadium, Wollongong
15:00	Scoring by quarter: 18–11, 14–23, 30–20, 23–20
NBL TV	Pts: Harvey 19; Rebs: Clark, Olbrich 6 Asts: Hickey 6	boxscore report	Pts: Gliddon 18; Rebs: Cheatham 9 Asts: Jackson-Cartwright 10	Attendance: n/a

6 September 2023	Perth Wildcats	105–124	G League Ignite	Dollar Loan Center, Henderson
18:00	Scoring by quarter: 19–30, 31–30, 27–36, 28–28
NBA TV	Pts: Usher 22; Rebs: Sarr 7 Asts: T.Webster 6	boxscore report	Pts: Holland 23; Rebs: Almansa 8 Asts: Johnson 6	Attendance: 2,113

8 September 2023	Perth Wildcats	127–112	G League Ignite	Dollar Loan Center, Henderson
18:00	Scoring by quarter: 38–30, 33–22, 22–30, 34–30
NBA TV	Pts: Cotton 40; Rebs: Sarr 10; Asts: Cotton 6	boxscore report	Pts: Holland 33; Rebs: Sané 12; Asts: Pargo 6	Attendance: 2,506

9 September 2023	Adelaide 36ers	78–103	Brisbane Bullets	The Lights Community & Sports Centre, Lightsview
14:00	Scoring by quarter: 27–25, 15–34, 14–20, 22–24
NBL TV	Pts: Wiley 16; Rebs: Flowers 6 Asts: five players 2	boxscore report	Pts: White 19; Rebs: Harrison 8 Asts: four players 3	Attendance: n/a

9 September 2023	Melbourne United	89–86	S.E. Melbourne Phoenix	Casey Stadium, Cranbourne East
19:00	Scoring by quarter: 21–16, 21–20, 9–20, 38–30
NBL TV	Pts: Clark 28; Rebs: Travers 12; Asts: Ili 5	boxscore report	Pts: Creek 32; Rebs: three players 5 Asts: Cummings 3	Attendance: n/a

10 October 2023	Cairns Taipans	82–145	Washington Wizards	Capital One Arena, Washington, D.C.
19:00	Scoring by quarter: 23–44, 23–38, 22–34, 14–29
Kayo Freebies	Pts: Gak 17; Rebs: Roberts 10; Asts: Armstrong 8	boxscore report	Pts: Kuzma 22; Rebs: Gafford 8 Asts: Wright 6	Attendance: 6,856

10 October 2023	New Zealand Breakers	66–106	Portland Trail Blazers	Moda Center, Portland
19:00	Scoring by quarter: 23–23, 16–25, 11–20, 16–38
NBA League Pass	Pts: Jackson-Cartwright 19; Rebs: Cheatham 10; Asts: Cheatham 4	boxscore report	Pts: Simons 14; Rebs: Brown 8 Asts: Henderson 6	Attendance: 12,694

15 October 2023	Cairns Taipans	93–134	Toronto Raptors	Scotiabank Arena, Toronto
18:00	Scoring by quarter: 17–38, 27–33, 39–33, 10–30
Kayo Freebies	Pts: Miller 22; Rebs: Roberts 9 Asts: Payton 7	boxscore report	Pts: Freeman-Liberty 15; Rebs: Boucher 8 Asts: Siakam 5	Attendance: 18,141

16 October 2023	New Zealand Breakers	94–114	Utah Jazz	Delta Center, Salt Lake City
19:00	Scoring by quarter: 11–31, 32–28, 22–25, 29–30
Kayo Freebies	Pts: Lamb 23; Rebs: Lamb 7 Asts: Jackson-Cartwright 6	boxscore report	Pts: Markkanen 15; Rebs: Markkanen 7 Asts: Juzang 4	Attendance: 14,190

== NBL Blitz ==
The 2023 NBL Blitz is an annual pre-season tournament featuring all teams. All games will takeplace in Gold Coast, Queensland.

This season all games will be played at the Gold Coast Convention Centre from the 16 to 22 September 2023.

=== Blitz ladder ===
Pos	Team	Pld	W	L	PF	PA	PP	BP	Pts
1	Melbourne United (C)	3	3	0	286	250	114.4	7.5	16.5
2	Perth Wildcats	3	3	0	307	264	116.3	6.5	15.5
3	Tasmania JackJumpers	3	3	0	275	251	109.6	6	15
4	Illawarra Hawks	3	2	1	274	263	104.2	8	14
5	New Zealand Breakers	3	1	2	275	260	105.8	6.5	9.5
6	S.E. Melbourne Phoenix	3	1	2	272	283	96.1	6	9
7	Brisbane Bullets	3	1	2	285	267	106.7	5	8
8	Cairns Taipans	3	1	2	285	305	93.4	5	8
9	Adelaide 36ers	3	0	3	237	299	79.3	5	5
10	Sydney Kings	3	0	3	249	303	82.2	4.5	4.5

Updated to match(es) played on 22 September 2023. Source: nblblitz.com.au
(C) Champions

=== Games ===
16 September 2023	S.E. Melbourne Phoenix	84–97	Tasmania JackJumpers	Gold Coast Convention Centre, Gold Coast
17:00	Scoring by quarter: 29–25, 18–29, 22–17, 15–26
Kayo Freebies	Pts: Cook 18; Rebs: Cook 11; Asts: Browne 7	boxscore report	Pts: Krslovic 16; Rebs: Crawford, Krslovic 6 Asts: Crawford 8	Attendance: n/a

16 September 2023	Brisbane Bullets	92–96	Melbourne United	Gold Coast Convention Centre, Gold Coast
19:30	Scoring by quarter: 30–21, 17–21, 27–28, 18–26
Kayo Freebies	Pts: Smith 21; Rebs: Bannan 10; Asts: Scott 6	boxscore report	Pts: Dellavedova 28; Rebs: Hukporti 8 Asts: Ili 4	Attendance: n/a

17 September 2023	Adelaide 36ers	75–101	New Zealand Breakers	Gold Coast Convention Centre, Gold Coast
13:00	Scoring by quarter: 17–17, 19–39, 23–17, 16–28
Kayo Freebies	Pts: Humphries 22; Rebs: Humphries 7 Asts: three players 3	boxscore report	Pts: Gliddon 19; Rebs: Cheatham 9 Asts: Jackson-Cartwright 8	Attendance: n/a

17 September 2023	Cairns Taipans	95–102	Perth Wildcats	Gold Coast Convention Centre, Gold Coast
15:30	Scoring by quarter: 22–36, 27–17, 26–20, 20–29
Kayo Freebies	Pts: Mayen 17; Rebs: Armstrong 8 Asts: Armstrong 7	boxscore report	Pts: Cotton 31; Rebs: Pinder, Sarr 8 Asts: three players 4	Attendance: n/a

18 September 2023	Melbourne United	85–71	Illawarra Hawks	Gold Coast Convention Centre, Gold Coast
17:00	Scoring by quarter: 28–13, 28–21, 12–19, 17–18
Kayo Freebies	Pts: Dellavedova 20; Rebs: Travers 8 Asts: Krebs, Travers 4	boxscore report	Pts: Peatling 13; Rebs: Froling 10; Asts: Harvey 4	Attendance: n/a

18 September 2023	Sydney Kings	86–93	S.E. Melbourne Phoenix	Gold Coast Convention Centre, Gold Coast
19:30	Scoring by quarter: 28–19, 23–21, 22–28, 13–25
Kayo Freebies	Pts: Galloway 18; Rebs: Valentine 11; Asts: Bruce 5	boxscore report	Pts: Cook 29; Rebs: Cook 9 Asts: Browne 3	Attendance: n/a

19 September 2023	New Zealand Breakers	85–92	Tasmania JackJumpers	Gold Coast Convention Centre, Gold Coast
17:00	Scoring by quarter: 23–25, 12–29, 26–19, 24–19
Kayo Freebies	Pts: Gliddon 17; Rebs: Cheatham 10; Asts: Gliddon, Jackson-Cartwright 5	boxscore report	Pts: McVeigh 19; Rebs: Crawford, McVeigh 5 Asts: Doyle 7	Attendance: n/a

19 September 2023	Perth Wildcats	112–80	Adelaide 36ers	Gold Coast Convention Centre, Gold Coast
19:30	Scoring by quarter: 37–11, 26–28, 22–22, 27–19
Kayo Freebies	Pts: Harris 18; Rebs: Sarr 8 Asts: five players 3	boxscore report	Pts: Cadee, Franklin 15; Rebs: Flowers 6 Asts: Cadee 4	Attendance: n/a

20 September 2023	Cairns Taipans	100–95	S.E. Melbourne Phoenix	Gold Coast Convention Centre, Gold Coast
13:00	Scoring by quarter: 30–34, 30–18, 17–28, 23–15
Kayo Freebies	Pts: Miller 21; Rebs: Gak 7 Asts: Armstrong 5	boxscore report	Pts: Browne 19; Rebs: Cook 6 Asts: Ayre 5	Attendance: n/a

20 September 2023	Brisbane Bullets	88–95	Illawarra Hawks	Gold Coast Convention Centre, Gold Coast
15:30	Scoring by quarter: 25–16, 24–29, 23–33, 16–17
Kayo Freebies	Pts: Baynes 20; Rebs: Baynes 20; Asts: Sobey 6	boxscore report	Pts: Olbrich 20; Rebs: Froling 6 Asts: four players 3	Attendance: n/a

20 September 2023	Melbourne United	105–87	Sydney Kings	Gold Coast Convention Centre, Gold Coast
19:30	Scoring by quarter: 32–28, 26–29, 36–19, 11–11
Kayo Freebies	Pts: Travers 21; Rebs: Hukporti 8 Asts: Ili 9	boxscore report	Pts: Toohey 19; Rebs: Hunter 8 Asts: Adams 5	Attendance: n/a

21 September 2023	Tasmania JackJumpers	86–82	Adelaide 36ers	Gold Coast Convention Centre, Gold Coast
17:00	Scoring by quarter: 16–25, 17–19, 33–19, 20–19
Kayo Freebies	Pts: Doyle 19; Rebs: Drmic 7 Asts: Doyle 7	boxscore report	Pts: Smith-Milner 21; Rebs: McCarron 7 Asts: McCarron 10	Attendance: n/a

21 September 2023	Perth Wildcats	93–89	New Zealand Breakers	Gold Coast Convention Centre, Gold Coast
19:30	Scoring by quarter: 12–22, 22–25, 25–22, 34–20
Kayo Freebies	Pts: Usher 26; Rebs: Pinder 13; Asts: Henshall 4	boxscore report	Pts: Delany 15; Rebs: Cheatham, Mathiang 6 Asts: Jackson-Cartwright 10	Attendance: n/a

22 September 2023	Illawarra Hawks	108–90	Cairns Taipans	Gold Coast Convention Centre, Gold Coast
17:00	Scoring by quarter: 30–17, 28–23, 22–29, 28–21
Kayo Freebies	Pts: Olbrich 18; Rebs: Swaka Lo Buluk 7 Asts: Olbrich 5	boxscore report	Pts: Gak 21; Rebs: Mayen 9 Asts: Armstrong 7	Attendance: n/a

22 September 2023	Sydney Kings	76–105	Brisbane Bullets	Gold Coast Convention Centre, Gold Coast
19:30	Scoring by quarter: 22–21, 18–24, 20–25, 16–35
Kayo Freebies	Pts: Valentine 12; Rebs: Toohey 5 Asts: Bruce 5	boxscore report	Pts: McDaniel 21; Rebs: Harrison 8 Asts: Norton 6	Attendance: n/a

=== Awards ===
The winning team will be awarded the Loggins-Bruton Cup, while the tournament’s most outstanding player will take home the Ray Borner Award.

- Loggins-Bruton Cup: Melbourne United
- Most Valuable Player (Ray Borner Medal): Tyler Cook (S.E. Melbourne Phoenix)
