= 2013–14 NBL season =

Professional basketball season

- League: National Basketball League
- Season: 2013–14
- Dates: 10 October 2013 – 13 April 2014
- Teams: 8
- TV partners: Australia: Network Ten; One HD; New Zealand: Sky Sport; Online: NBL TV; LiveBasketball.TV

Regular season
- Season champions: Perth Wildcats
- Season MVP: (United States) Rotnei Clarke (Wollongong)

Finals
- Champions: Perth Wildcats (6th title)
- Runners-up: Adelaide 36ers
- Semifinalists: Melbourne Tigers; Wollongong Hawks
- Finals MVP: (United States) Jermaine Beal (Perth)

Statistical leaders
Points	(Australia) Chris Goulding (Melbourne)	23.0
Rebounds	(Australia) Andrew Ogilvy (Sydney)	8.6
Assists	(Australia) Nate Tomlinson (Melbourne)	5.2

NBL seasons
- ← 2012–13 2014–15 →

The 2013–14 NBL season was the 36th season of competition since its establishment in 1979. A total of eight teams contested the league. The regular season was played between 10 October 2013 and 23 March 2014, and was followed by a post-season featuring the top four in late March and April 2014. The schedule was announced on 9 August 2013. The Perth Wildcats defeated the Adelaide 36ers 2–1 in the three-game finals series, with the final match at Perth Arena attended by 13,498 people.

Australian broadcast rights to the season were held by free-to-air network Channel Ten and its digital sports sister station One, in the fourth year of a five-year deal, through to the 2014–15 season. In New Zealand, Sky Sport are the official league broadcaster, in the second year of a three-year deal.

== Pre-season ==
=== Sydney Kings pre-season ===
6 August 2013	Sydney Kings	85–87	University of New Mexico	Bankstown Basketball Stadium, Sydney
.

8 August 2013	Sydney Kings	76–82	Butler University	Newington College, Sydney
.

30 August 2013	Sydney Kings	54–73	Melbourne Tigers	Scholastic Stadium, Terrigal
.

31 August 2013	Sydney Kings	74–95	Melbourne Tigers	Hills Sports Stadium, Sydney
.

16 September 2013	Sydney Kings	74–72	Townsville Crocodiles	The King's School, Sydney
.

27 September 2013	Sydney Kings	99–107 (OT)	Wollongong Hawks	Sutherland Basketball Stadium, Sydney
.

=== Cairns Taipans pre-season ===
11 August 2013	Cairns Taipans	97–73	Butler University	Bendigo Bank Basketball Stadium, Cairns
.

19 August 2013	Cairns Taipans	76–66	Saint Mary's College of California	Ipswich Basketball Stadium, Ipswich
.

20 August 2013	Cairns Taipans	86–68	Saint Mary's College of California	The Southport School, Gold Coast
.

6 September 2013	Cairns Taipans	87–72	Wollongong Hawks	Bendigo Bank Basketball Stadium, Cairns
.

24 September 2013	Cairns Taipans	102–99	Perth Wildcats	Bendigo Bank Basketball Stadium, Cairns
.

29 September 2013	Cairns Taipans	96–86	Townsville Crocodiles	Bendigo Bank Basketball Stadium, Cairns
.

=== Wollongong Hawks pre-season ===
12 August 2013	Wollongong Hawks	69–72	Saint Mary's College of California	Bomaderry Basketball Stadium, Shoalhaven
.

29 September 2013	Wollongong Hawks	93–98	Sydney Kings	Beaton Park Stadium, Wollongong
.

=== Melbourne Tigers pre-season ===
15 August 2013	Melbourne Tigers	70–67	Saint Mary's College of California	Kilsyth Sports Centre, Melbourne
.

=== Adelaide 36ers pre-season ===
==== 2013 Intercontinental Cup Basketball Challenge ====
16 August 2013	Adelaide 36ers	64–89	BC Prienai	New Shenzhen Stadium, Shenzhen, China
.

17 August 2013	Adelaide 36ers	75–83	Utah Valley University	New Shenzhen Stadium, Shenzhen, China
.

18 August 2013	Dongguan Leopards	96–92	Adelaide 36ers	New Shenzhen Stadium, Shenzhen, China
CCTV-5

Adelaide 36ers finish fourth (last).

14 September 2013	Adelaide 36ers	100–66	CABL All-Stars	Pasadena Sports Centre, Adelaide
.

2 October 2013	Adelaide 36ers	88–84	Melbourne Tigers	Millicent Basketball Stadium, Millicent
.

3 October 2013	Adelaide 36ers	100–104 (OT)	Melbourne Tigers	Bern Bruning Basketball Stadium, Mount Gambier
.

=== Perth Wildcats pre-season ===
8 September 2013	Perth Wildcats	93–79	SBL All-Stars	Western Australian Basketball Centre, Perth
.

=== New Zealand Breakers pre-season ===
10 September 2013	New Zealand Breakers	80–83	Melbourne Tigers	CBS Canterbury Arena, Christchurch
.				Attendance: 6,400

29 September 2013	New Zealand Breakers	114–93	Dongguan Leopards	TSB Stadium, New Plymouth
.				Attendance: 2,264

1 October 2013	New Zealand Breakers	82–81	Dongguan Leopards	Claudelands Arena, Hamilton
.				Attendance: 3,014

3 October 2013	New Zealand Breakers	86–80	Dongguan Leopards	Vector Arena, Auckland
Sky Sport				Attendance: 7,011

=== Townsville Crocodiles pre-season ===
26 September 2013	Townsville Crocodiles	91–95	Perth Wildcats	RSL Stadium, Townsville
.

=== 2013 NBL Pre-Season Blitz ===
A pre-season tournament featuring all eight teams was held on 20–22 September 2013 at Northern Suburbs Indoor Sports Centre, Sydney. The winner received the inaugural Loggins-Bruton Cup.

==== Opening round ====
7 September 2013	Cairns Taipans	86–64	Wollongong Hawks	Bendigo Bank Basketball Stadium, Cairns
.

12 September 2013	New Zealand Breakers	76–94	Melbourne Tigers	TSB Bank Arena, Wellington
.				Attendance: 3,200

17 September 2013	Sydney Kings	81–70	Townsville Crocodiles	Penrith Sports Stadium, Sydney
.

18 September 2013	Adelaide 36ers	102–91	Perth Wildcats	Trinity Grammar, Sydney
.

==== Final round ====
20 September 2013	Adelaide 36ers	86–105	Townsville Crocodiles	Northern Suburbs Indoor Sports Centre, Sydney
.

20 September 2013	New Zealand Breakers	64–91	Perth Wildcats	Northern Suburbs Indoor Sports Centre, Sydney
.

21 September 2013	Adelaide 36ers	105–101	Cairns Taipans	Northern Suburbs Indoor Sports Centre, Sydney
.

21 September 2013	Perth Wildcats	95–75	Wollongong Hawks	Northern Suburbs Indoor Sports Centre, Sydney
.

21 September 2013	Sydney Kings	97–93	New Zealand Breakers	Northern Suburbs Indoor Sports Centre, Sydney
.

21 September 2013	Melbourne Tigers	84–86	Townsville Crocodiles	Northern Suburbs Indoor Sports Centre, Sydney
.

22 September 2013	Sydney Kings	91–99	Cairns Taipans	Northern Suburbs Indoor Sports Centre, Sydney
.

22 September 2013	Melbourne Tigers	98–101	Wollongong Hawks	Northern Suburbs Indoor Sports Centre, Sydney
.

Perth Wildcats are pre-season champions.

== Regular season ==
=== Round 1 ===
10 October 2013	New Zealand Breakers	92–73	Wollongong Hawks	Vector Arena, Auckland
Sky Sport				Attendance: 6,087

11 October 2013	Perth Wildcats	83–80	Adelaide 36ers	Perth Arena, Perth
One				Attendance: 10,208

12 October 2013	Townsville Crocodiles	92–103	Cairns Taipans	Townsville Entertainment Centre, Townsville
NBL TV				Attendance: 3,265

13 October 2013	Sydney Kings	73–69	Melbourne Tigers	Sydney Entertainment Centre, Sydney
Network Ten				Attendance: 4,424

=== Round 2 ===
18 October 2013	Townsville Crocodiles	94–84	New Zealand Breakers	Townsville Entertainment Centre, Townsville
NBL TV				Attendance: 2,905

18 October 2013	Perth Wildcats	81–69	Sydney Kings	Perth Arena, Perth
One				Attendance: 10,573

19 October 2013	Adelaide 36ers	97–91	Wollongong Hawks	Adelaide Arena, Adelaide
NBL TV				Attendance: 5,815

19 October 2013	Cairns Taipans	86–85	New Zealand Breakers	Cairns Convention Centre, Cairns
NBL TV				Attendance: 4,747

20 October 2013	Melbourne Tigers	71–75	Perth Wildcats	State Netball and Hockey Centre, Melbourne
One				Attendance: 3,350

=== Round 3 ===
24 October 2013	New Zealand Breakers	89–96	Perth Wildcats	North Shore Events Centre, Auckland
Sky Sport				Attendance: 3,460

25 October 2013	Cairns Taipans	84–87	Adelaide 36ers	Cairns Convention Centre, Cairns
One				Attendance: 3,703

26 October 2013	Wollongong Hawks	85–81	Townsville Crocodiles	WIN Entertainment Centre, Wollongong
NBL TV				Attendance: 4,474

27 October 2013	Melbourne Tigers	93–79	Adelaide 36ers	State Netball and Hockey Centre, Melbourne
NBL TV				Attendance: 3,236

27 October 2013	Sydney Kings	72–82	Perth Wildcats	Sydney Entertainment Centre, Sydney
Network Ten				Attendance: 5,507

=== Round 4 ===
31 October 2013	New Zealand Breakers	93–96	Adelaide 36ers	North Shore Events Centre, Auckland
Sky Sport				Attendance: 3,175

1 November 2013	Townsville Crocodiles	86–88	Sydney Kings	Townsville Entertainment Centre, Townsville
NBL TV				Attendance: 3,163

1 November 2013	Perth Wildcats	87–47	Wollongong Hawks	Perth Arena, Perth
One				Attendance: 11,570

2 November 2013	Cairns Taipans	74–86	Melbourne Tigers	Cairns Convention Centre, Cairns
NBL TV				Attendance: 3,873

3 November 2013	Adelaide 36ers	97–84	Sydney Kings	Adelaide Arena, Adelaide
Network Ten				Attendance: 4,540

3 November 2013	Wollongong Hawks	89–97	New Zealand Breakers	WIN Entertainment Centre, Wollongong
NBL TV				Attendance: 2,132

=== Round 5 ===
8 November 2013	Sydney Kings	99–86	Cairns Taipans	Sydney Entertainment Centre, Sydney
One				Attendance: 3,990

8 November 2013	Adelaide 36ers	90–87	Melbourne Tigers	Adelaide Arena, Adelaide
NBL TV				Attendance: 4,364

8 November 2013	Townsville Crocodiles	91–78	New Zealand Breakers	Townsville Entertainment Centre, Townsville
NBL TV				Attendance: 3,170

10 November 2013	Melbourne Tigers	81–76	Wollongong Hawks	State Netball and Hockey Centre, Melbourne
Network Ten				Attendance: 3,088

=== Round 6 ===
14 November 2013	Perth Wildcats	75–68	Cairns Taipans	Perth Arena, Perth
NBL TV				Attendance: 10,322

15 November 2013	New Zealand Breakers	94–95	Adelaide 36ers	Vector Arena, Auckland
Sky Sport				Attendance: 7,470

15 November 2013	Sydney Kings	88–67	Townsville Crocodiles	Sydney Entertainment Centre, Sydney
One				Attendance: 5,163

16 November 2013	Melbourne Tigers	88–85	Cairns Taipans	State Netball and Hockey Centre, Melbourne
NBL TV				Attendance: 3,226

17 November 2013	Wollongong Hawks	76–89	Perth Wildcats	WIN Entertainment Centre, Wollongong
Network Ten				Attendance: 2,171

=== Round 7 ===
22 November 2013	New Zealand Breakers	81–74	Townsville Crocodiles	North Shore Events Centre, Auckland
Sky Sport				Attendance: 3,405

22 November 2013	Adelaide 36ers	91–86	Perth Wildcats	Adelaide Arena, Adelaide
One				Attendance: 6,585

23 November 2013	Cairns Taipans	73–75	Wollongong Hawks	Cairns Convention Centre, Cairns
NBL TV				Attendance: 3,800

24 November 2013	Melbourne Tigers	75–90	Townsville Crocodiles	State Netball and Hockey Centre, Melbourne
Network Ten				Attendance: 3,315

24 November 2013	Perth Wildcats	98–55	Sydney Kings	Perth Arena, Perth
NBL TV				Attendance: 11,960

=== Round 8 ===
28 November 2013	New Zealand Breakers	84–74	Melbourne Tigers	North Shore Events Centre, Auckland
Sky Sport				Attendance: 3,211

29 November 2013	Adelaide 36ers	82–81	Wollongong Hawks	Adelaide Arena, Adelaide
One				Attendance: 4,080

30 November 2013	Cairns Taipans	75–85 (OT)	Perth Wildcats	Cairns Convention Centre, Cairns
NBL TV				Attendance: 3,508

1 December 2013	Melbourne Tigers	63–67	Sydney Kings	State Netball and Hockey Centre, Melbourne
Network Ten				Attendance: 3,500

=== Round 9 ===
6 December 2013	Townsville Crocodiles	98–94	Adelaide 36ers	Townsville Entertainment Centre, Townsville
NBL TV				Attendance: 2,909

6 December 2013	Perth Wildcats	95–91	New Zealand Breakers	Perth Arena, Perth
One				Attendance: 11,373

7 December 2013	Wollongong Hawks	73–69	Sydney Kings	WIN Entertainment Centre, Wollongong
NBL TV				Attendance: 2,224

7 December 2013	Cairns Taipans	98–78	Adelaide 36ers	Cairns Convention Centre, Cairns
NBL TV				Attendance: 3,750

8 December 2013	Melbourne Tigers	84–82	New Zealand Breakers	State Netball and Hockey Centre, Melbourne
Network Ten				Attendance: 3,500

=== Round 10 ===
13 December 2013	New Zealand Breakers	62–71	Perth Wildcats	Vector Arena, Auckland
Sky Sport				Attendance: 7,597

13 December 2013	Cairns Taipans	87–74	Townsville Crocodiles	Cairns Convention Centre, Cairns
One				Attendance: 3,894

14 December 2013	Sydney Kings	63–69	Wollongong Hawks	Sydney Entertainment Centre, Sydney
NBL TV				Attendance: 6,038

14 December 2013	Townsville Crocodiles	71–76	Melbourne Tigers	Townsville Entertainment Centre, Townsville
NBL TV				Attendance: 2,853

15 December 2013	Adelaide 36ers	91–67	Cairns Taipans	Adelaide Arena, Adelaide
Network Ten				Attendance: 4,981

=== Round 11 ===
27 December 2013	Melbourne Tigers	74–67	Wollongong Hawks	State Netball and Hockey Centre, Melbourne
One				Attendance: 3,500

29 December 2013	Sydney Kings	83–99	New Zealand Breakers	Sydney Entertainment Centre, Sydney
Network Ten				Attendance: 5,655

31 December 2013	Wollongong Hawks	81–91 (2OT)	Melbourne Tigers	WIN Entertainment Centre, Wollongong
NBL TV				Attendance: 2,633

31 December 2013	Cairns Taipans	99–90	Perth Wildcats	Cairns Convention Centre, Cairns
NBL TV				Attendance: 4,809

31 December 2013	Townsville Crocodiles	89–90	Adelaide 36ers	Townsville Entertainment Centre, Townsville
NBL TV				Attendance: 3,920

=== Round 12 ===
3 January 2014	Sydney Kings	62–73	Cairns Taipans	Sydney Entertainment Centre, Sydney
One				Attendance: 3,816

3 January 2014	Townsville Crocodiles	77–95	Melbourne Tigers	Townsville Entertainment Centre, Townsville
NBL TV				Attendance: 3,044

4 January 2014	Wollongong Hawks	96–91 (OT)	Perth Wildcats	WIN Entertainment Centre, Wollongong
NBL TV				Attendance: 2,134

4 January 2014	Adelaide 36ers	99–73	New Zealand Breakers	Adelaide Arena, Adelaide
NBL TV				Attendance: 6,676

5 January 2014	Melbourne Tigers	76–66	Cairns Taipans	State Netball and Hockey Centre, Melbourne
Network Ten				Attendance: 3,500

=== Round 13 ===
10 January 2014	Melbourne Tigers	87–93	New Zealand Breakers	State Netball and Hockey Centre, Melbourne
One				Attendance: 3,500

10 January 2014	Perth Wildcats	102–87	Townsville Crocodiles	Perth Arena, Perth
NBL TV				Attendance: 12,050

11 January 2014	Cairns Taipans	79–82	Wollongong Hawks	Cairns Convention Centre, Cairns
NBL TV				Attendance: 3,922

12 January 2014	Adelaide 36ers	89–102	Sydney Kings	Adelaide Arena, Adelaide
Network Ten				Attendance: 6,314

12 January 2014	Townsville Crocodiles	97–103	Perth Wildcats	Townsville Entertainment Centre, Townsville
NBL TV				Attendance: 3,140

=== Round 14 ===
17 January 2014	Cairns Taipans	88–92	Sydney Kings	Cairns Convention Centre, Cairns
NBL TV				Attendance: 3,916

17 January 2014	Perth Wildcats	95–73	New Zealand Breakers	Perth Arena, Perth
One				Attendance: 13,206

18 January 2014	Adelaide 36ers	92–79	Townsville Crocodiles	Adelaide Arena, Adelaide
NBL TV				Attendance: 5,737

19 January 2014	Sydney Kings	97–84	Melbourne Tigers	Sydney Entertainment Centre, Sydney
Network Ten				Attendance: 4,492

19 January 2014	Wollongong Hawks	77–79	Cairns Taipans	WIN Entertainment Centre, Wollongong
NBL TV				Attendance: 2,025

=== Round 15 ===
23 January 2014	New Zealand Breakers	106–101	Wollongong Hawks	North Shore Events Centre, Auckland
Sky Sport				Attendance: 3,526

24 January 2014	Townsville Crocodiles	79–90	Cairns Taipans	Townsville Entertainment Centre, Townsville
NBL TV				Attendance: 3,405

24 January 2014	Perth Wildcats	80–83	Melbourne Tigers	Perth Arena, Perth
One				Attendance: 11,493

26 January 2014	Sydney Kings	105–93	Adelaide 36ers	Sydney Entertainment Centre, Sydney
Network Ten				Attendance: 3,622

26 January 2014	Wollongong Hawks	78–86	Melbourne Tigers	WIN Entertainment Centre, Wollongong
NBL TV				Attendance: 1,836

=== Round 16 ===
30 January 2014	New Zealand Breakers	105–87	Sydney Kings	Vector Arena, Auckland
Sky Sport				Attendance: 6,052

30 January 2014	Perth Wildcats	94–99 (OT)	Cairns Taipans	Perth Arena, Perth
NBL TV				Attendance: 11,771

31 January 2014	Townsville Crocodiles	80–67	Wollongong Hawks	Townsville Entertainment Centre, Townsville
NBL TV				Attendance: 3,098

1 February 2014	Adelaide 36ers	89–87	Cairns Taipans	Adelaide Arena, Adelaide
NBL TV				Attendance: 5,519

2 February 2014	Melbourne Tigers	57–81	Perth Wildcats	Hisense Arena, Melbourne
Network Ten				Attendance: 6,323

=== Round 17 ===
7 February 2014	Townsville Crocodiles	88–75	Perth Wildcats	Townsville Entertainment Centre, Townsville
One				Attendance: 3,207

8 February 2014	Sydney Kings	98–96	New Zealand Breakers	Sydney Entertainment Centre, Sydney
NBL TV				Attendance: 4,736

8 February 2014	Cairns Taipans	82–90	Townsville Crocodiles	Cairns Convention Centre, Cairns
NBL TV				Attendance: 4,567

9 February 2014	Wollongong Hawks	102–80	Adelaide 36ers	WIN Entertainment Centre, Wollongong
Network Ten				Attendance: 1,840

=== Round 18 ===
14 February 2014	New Zealand Breakers	96–78	Cairns Taipans	Vector Arena, Auckland
Sky Sport				Attendance: 6,442

14 February 2014	Wollongong Hawks	90–75	Townsville Crocodiles	WIN Entertainment Centre, Wollongong
NBL TV				Attendance: 1,711

14 February 2014	Perth Wildcats	85–61	Adelaide 36ers	Perth Arena, Perth
One				Attendance: 11,473

15 February 2014	Sydney Kings	84–102	Wollongong Hawks	Sydney Entertainment Centre, Sydney
NBL TV				Attendance: 4,296

16 February 2014	Melbourne Tigers	82–99	Adelaide 36ers	Hisense Arena, Melbourne
Network Ten				Attendance: 6,704

=== Round 19 ===
21 February 2014	Wollongong Hawks	88–68	New Zealand Breakers	WIN Entertainment Centre, Wollongong
NBL TV				Attendance: 2,444

21 February 2014	Cairns Taipans	63–85	Sydney Kings	Cairns Convention Centre, Cairns
NBL TV				Attendance: 3,691

21 February 2014	Perth Wildcats	87–75	Melbourne Tigers	Perth Arena, Perth
One				Attendance: 11,696

22 February 2014	Townsville Crocodiles	90–83	Sydney Kings	Townsville Entertainment Centre, Townsville
NBL TV				Attendance: 3,399

23 February 2014	Adelaide 36ers	96–92	New Zealand Breakers	Adelaide Arena, Adelaide
Network Ten				Attendance: 6,011

=== Round 20 ===
27 February 2014	New Zealand Breakers	102–99	Townsville Crocodiles	North Shore Events Centre, Auckland
Sky Sport				Attendance: 3,315

28 February 2014	Wollongong Hawks	91–89	Adelaide 36ers	WIN Entertainment Centre, Wollongong
One				Attendance: 3,123

1 March 2014	Melbourne Tigers	106–109 (OT)	Townsville Crocodiles	Hisense Arena, Melbourne
NBL TV				Attendance: 6,001

1 March 2014	Cairns Taipans	92–87	New Zealand Breakers	Cairns Convention Centre, Cairns
NBL TV				Attendance: 3,823

2 March 2014	Sydney Kings	81–85	Perth Wildcats	Sydney Entertainment Centre, Sydney
Network Ten				Attendance: 5,435

=== Round 21 ===
7 March 2014	New Zealand Breakers	84–97	Melbourne Tigers	Vector Arena, Auckland
Sky Sport				Attendance: 6,808

7 March 2014	Perth Wildcats	81–69	Townsville Crocodiles	Perth Arena, Perth
One				Attendance: 11,528

8 March 2014	Wollongong Hawks	79–82	Cairns Taipans	WIN Entertainment Centre, Wollongong
NBL TV				Attendance: 3,082

8 March 2014	Adelaide 36ers	102–70	Townsville Crocodiles	Adelaide Arena, Adelaide
NBL TV				Attendance: 5,722

9 March 2014	Melbourne Tigers	92–82	Sydney Kings	Hisense Arena, Melbourne
Network Ten				Attendance: 7,523

=== Round 22 ===
13 March 2014	New Zealand Breakers	106–78	Sydney Kings	North Shore Events Centre, Auckland
Sky Sport				Attendance: 3,279

14 March 2014	Adelaide 36ers	102–79	Perth Wildcats	Adelaide Arena, Adelaide
One				Attendance: 6,253

14 March 2014	Cairns Taipans	66–73	Melbourne Tigers	Cairns Convention Centre, Cairns
NBL TV				Attendance: 4,137

14 March 2014	Townsville Crocodiles	85–94	Wollongong Hawks	Townsville Entertainment Centre, Townsville
NBL TV				Attendance: 3,678

16 March 2014	Sydney Kings	100–90	Adelaide 36ers	Sydney Entertainment Centre, Sydney
Network Ten				Attendance: 3,746

=== Round 23 ===
21 March 2014	New Zealand Breakers	83–95	Cairns Taipans	Vector Arena, Auckland
Sky Sport				Attendance: 7,947

21 March 2014	Wollongong Hawks	100–87	Sydney Kings	WIN Entertainment Centre, Wollongong
One				Attendance: 4,446

22 March 2014	Sydney Kings	79–88	Townsville Crocodiles	Sydney Entertainment Centre, Sydney
NBL TV				Attendance: 4,676

23 March 2014	Adelaide 36ers	99–94	Melbourne Tigers	Adelaide Arena, Adelaide
Network Ten				Attendance: 5,843

23 March 2014	Perth Wildcats	86–65	Wollongong Hawks	Perth Arena, Perth
NBL TV				Attendance: 11,943

== Ladder ==
Pos	2013–14 NBL season											
Pos	Team	Pld	W	L	PCT	Last 5	Streak	Home	Away	PF	PA	PP
1	Perth Wildcats	28	21	7	75.00%	4–1	W1	12–2	9–5	2419	2177	111.12%
2	Adelaide 36ers	28	18	10	64.29%	3–2	W1	13–1	5–9	2527	2469	102.35%
3	Melbourne Tigers	28	15	13	53.57%	3–2	L1	7–7	8–6	2299	2292	100.31%
4	Wollongong Hawks	28	13	15	46.43%	3–2	L1	8–6	5–9	2295	2333	98.37%
5	Sydney Kings^{1}	28	12	16	42.86%	1–4	L2	7–7	5–9	2312	2414	95.78%
6	Cairns Taipans^{1}	28	12	16	42.86%	3–2	W1	5–9	7–7	2304	2349	98.08%
7	New Zealand Breakers	28	11	17	39.29%	2–3	L1	8–6	3–11	2474	2493	99.24%
8	Townsville Crocodiles	28	10	18	35.71%	2–3	W1	6–8	4–10	2369	2472	95.83%

Updated to match(es) played on 23 March 2014. Source: NBL.com.au

^{1}Sydney Kings won Head-to-Head (3-1).

=== Ladder Progression ===
- Numbers highlighted in green indicate that the team finished the round inside the top four.
- Numbers highlighted in blue indicates the team finished first on the ladder in that round.
- Numbers highlighted in red indicates the team finished last place on the ladder in that round.

2013–14 NBL season
Team	1	2	3	4	5	6	7	8	9	10	11	12	13	14	15	16	17	18	19	20	21	22	23
Adelaide 36ers	5	3	3	2	2	2	2	2	2	2	2	2	2	2	2	2	2	2	2	2	2	2	2
Cairns Taipans	2	2	2	4	6	6	7	7	7	7	5	4	7	5	5	5	5	7	7	7	6	7	5
Melbourne Tigers	6	7	4	3	3	3	3	5	4	3	3	3	3	3	3	3	3	3	3	3	3	3	3
New Zealand Breakers	1	6	8	6	7	7	6	4	6	8	6	7	6	7	6	6	6	5	6	6	7	6	7
Perth Wildcats	4	1	1	1	1	1	1	1	1	1	1	1	1	1	1	1	1	1	1	1	1	1	1
Sydney Kings	3	5	6	5	4	4	4	3	3	4	4	5	4	4	4	4	4	4	4	4	4	5	6
Townsville Crocodiles	7	4	5	7	5	5	5	6	5	5	7	8	8	8	8	8	7	8	8	8	8	8	8
Wollongong Hawks	8	8	7	8	8	8	8	8	8	6	8	6	5	6	7	7	8	6	5	5	5	4	4

== Finals ==
The 2013–14 National Basketball League Finals will be played in March and April 2014, consisting of two best-of-three semi-final and final series, where the higher seed hosts the first and third games.

=== Playoff Seedings ===
1. Perth Wildcats
2. Adelaide 36ers
3. Melbourne Tigers
4. Wollongong Hawks

The NBL tie-breaker system as outlined in the NBL Rules and Regulations states that in the case of an identical win–loss record, the results in games played between the teams will determine order of seeding.

=== Playoff bracket ===
Semifinals
1	Perth Wildcats	91	80	X
4	Wollongong Hawks	79	61	X
2	Adelaide 36ers	101	87	102
3	Melbourne Tigers	85	98	63

Grand Final
1	Perth Wildcats	92	84	93
2	Adelaide 36ers	85	89	59

=== Semi-finals ===
27 March 2014	Adelaide 36ers	101–85	Melbourne Tigers	Adelaide Arena, Adelaide
One				Attendance: 3,865

28 March 2014	Perth Wildcats	91–79	Wollongong Hawks	Perth Arena, Perth
One				Attendance: 10,907

30 March 2014	Melbourne Tigers	98–87	Adelaide 36ers	Hisense Arena, Melbourne
Network Ten				Attendance: 4,044

30 March 2014	Wollongong Hawks	61–80	Perth Wildcats	WIN Entertainment Centre, Wollongong
One				Attendance: 2,721

1 April 2014	Adelaide 36ers	102–63	Melbourne Tigers	Adelaide Arena, Adelaide
One				Attendance: 4,024

=== Grand final ===
7 April 2014	Perth Wildcats	92–85	Adelaide 36ers	Perth Arena, Perth
One				Attendance: 13,291

11 April 2014	Adelaide 36ers	89–84	Perth Wildcats	Adelaide Arena, Adelaide
One				Attendance: 8,127

13 April 2014	Perth Wildcats	93–59	Adelaide 36ers	Perth Arena, Perth
Network Ten				Attendance: 13,498

== Season statistics ==
=== Statistics leaders ===
Category	Player	Games played	Totals	Average
Points per game	Chris Goulding (Melbourne Tigers)	27	621	23.0
Rebounds per game	Andrew Ogilvy (Sydney Kings)	28	243	8.7
Assists per game	Nate Tomlinson (Melbourne Tigers)	28	146	5.2
Steals per game	Damian Martin (Perth Wildcats)	28	66	2.3
Blocks per game	Andrew Ogilvy (Sydney Kings)	28	65	2.3
Field goal percentage	Scott Morrison (Melbourne Tigers)	28	120-209	57.4%
Three-point field goal percentage	Damian Martin (Perth Wildcats)	28	35-74	47.3%
Free throw percentage	Jacob Holmes (Townsville Crocodiles)	28	41-43	95.3%

Note: regular season only (minimum 14 games) and excluding negligible attempts

=== Attendances ===
==== Regular season ====
Team	Hosted	Average	Highest	Lowest	Total
Adelaide 36ers	14	5,603	6,676	4,080	78,440
Cairns Taipans	14	4,010	4,809	3,508	56,140
Melbourne Tigers	14	4,305	7,523	3,088	60,266
New Zealand Breakers	14	5,127	7,947	3,175	71,774
Perth Wildcats	14	11,512	13,206	10,208	161,166
Sydney Kings	14	4,685	6,038	3,622	65,596
Townsville Crocodiles	14	3,225	3,920	2,853	45,156
Wollongong Hawks	14	2,591	4,474	1,711	36,275
Totals	112	5,132	13,206	1,711	574,813

==== Finals ====
Team	Hosted	Average	Highest	Lowest	Total
Adelaide 36ers	3	5,339	8,127	3,865	16,016
Melbourne Tigers	1	4,044	4,044	4,044	4,044
Perth Wildcats	3	12,565	13,498	10,907	37,696
Wollongong Hawks	1	2,721	2,721	2,721	2,721
Totals	8	7,560	13,498	2,721	60,447

=== Top 10 Attendances ===
Attendance	Round	Date	Home	Score	Away	Venue	Weekday	Time of Day
13,498	GF	13 April 2014	Perth Wildcats	93-59	Adelaide 36ers	Perth Arena	Sunday	Afternoon
13,291	GF	7 April 2014	Perth Wildcats	92-85	Adelaide 36ers	Perth Arena	Monday	Night
13,206	14	17 January 2014	Perth Wildcats	95-73	New Zealand Breakers	Perth Arena	Friday	Night
12,050	13	10 January 2014	Perth Wildcats	102-87	Townsville Crocodiles	Perth Arena	Friday	Night
11,960	7	24 November 2013	Perth Wildcats	98-55	Sydney Kings	Perth Arena	Sunday	Afternoon
11,943	23	23 March 2014	Perth Wildcats	86-65	Wollongong Hawks	Perth Arena	Sunday	Afternoon
11,771	16	30 January 2014	Perth Wildcats	94-99 (OT)	Cairns Taipans	Perth Arena	Thursday	Night
11,696	19	21 February 2014	Perth Wildcats	87-75	Melbourne Tigers	Perth Arena	Friday	Night
11,570	4	1 November 2013	Perth Wildcats	87-47	Wollongong Hawks	Perth Arena	Friday	Night
11,528	21	7 March 2014	Perth Wildcats	81-69	Townsville Crocodiles	Perth Arena	Friday	Night

== Awards ==
=== Player of the Month ===
Month	Player	Team
October	James Ennis	Perth Wildcats
November	Chris Goulding	Melbourne Tigers
December	Rotnei Clarke	Wollongong Hawks
January	Sam Young	Sydney Kings
February	Rotnei Clarke	Wollongong Hawks

=== Coach of the Month ===
Month	Player	Team
October	Trevor Gleeson	Perth Wildcats
November	Joey Wright	Adelaide 36ers
December	Chris Anstey	Melbourne Tigers
January	Shane Heal	Sydney Kings
February	Gordie McLeod	Wollongong Hawks

=== Pre-season ===
- Most Valuable Player (Ray Borner Medal): James Ennis, Perth Wildcats

=== Season ===
The end-of-season awards ceremony was held in the Sketch private dining room at Docklands, Melbourne on Wednesday, 2 April 2014.

- Most Valuable Player (Andrew Gaze Trophy): Rotnei Clarke, Wollongong Hawks
- Rookie of the Year: Tom Jervis, Perth Wildcats
- Best Defensive Player: Damian Martin, Perth Wildcats
- Best Sixth Man: Kevin Tiggs, Wollongong Hawks
- Most Improved Player: Nate Tomlinson, Melbourne Tigers
- Coach of the Year (Lindsay Gaze Trophy): Gordie McLeod, Wollongong Hawks
- Referee of the Year: Michael Aylen
- All-NBL First Team:
  - Rotnei Clarke - Wollongong Hawks
  - Chris Goulding - Melbourne Tigers
  - James Ennis - Perth Wildcats
  - Daniel Johnson - Adelaide 36ers
  - Andrew Ogilvy - Sydney Kings
- All-NBL Second Team:
  - Damian Martin - Perth Wildcats
  - Jermaine Beal - Perth Wildcats
  - Sam Young - Sydney Kings
  - Mika Vukona - New Zealand Breakers
  - Brian Conklin - Townsville Crocodiles

=== Finals ===
- Grand Final Series MVP (Larry Sengstock Medal): Jermaine Beal, Perth Wildcats

== See also ==
- 2013–14 Adelaide 36ers season
- 2013–14 New Zealand Breakers season
