= 2018 NBL pre-season =

The pre-season of the 2018–19 NBL season, the 41st season of Australia's National Basketball League, started on 8 June 2018 and ended 5 October 2018.

The pre-season featured games in China and Malaysia. As well, it featured the NBLxNBA 2018 Tour in which five NBL teams played a total of seven games.

== Games ==
=== 2018 NBL All-Australian Tour of China ===
8 June 2018	China	52–64	NBL All-Australian Team	Jiyuan Basketball City Sports Stadium, Jiyuan, China
Fox Sports

10 June 2018	China	55–58	NBL All-Australian Team	Hengyang Stadium, Hengyang, China
Fox Sports

12 June 2018	China	82–62	NBL All-Australian Team	Peking University Gymnasium, Beijing, China
Fox Sports

The NBL All-Australian Team won the series 2–1.

=== Adelaide 36ers pre-season ===
25 September 2018	Adelaide 36ers	99–75	Cairns Taipans	Titanium Security Arena, Adelaide
NBL TV				Attendance: 4,000

=== Brisbane Bullets pre-season ===
11 August 2018	Brisbane Bullets	73–54	University of Hawaii	Anglican Church Grammar School, Brisbane
NBL TV				Attendance: 700

31 August 2018	Brisbane Bullets	74–95	Cairns Taipans	Cquniversity Community Sports Centre, Rockhampton
YouTube TV

30 September 2018	Brisbane Bullets	90–101	Illawarra Hawks	USC Sports Stadium, Sunshine Coast
NBL TV				Attendance: 200

=== Cairns Taipans pre-season ===
23 August 2018	Cairns Taipans	92–76	Drexel University	Early Settler Stadium, Cairns
NBL TV

=== Illawarra Hawks pre-season ===
14 August 2018	Illawarra Hawks	77–86	Saint Mary's College of California	Beaton Park Stadium, Wollongong
NBL TV				Attendance: 2,000

14 September 2018	Illawarra Hawks	81–99	Adelaide 36ers	Southern Cross Stadium, Canberra
NBL TV				Attendance: 1,090

16 September 2018	Illawarra Hawks	77–83	Sydney Kings	WIN Entertainment Centre, Wollongong
NBL TV				Attendance: 2,000

==== Seri Mutiara Cup 2018 ====
2 October 2018	Eastern Long Lions (Hong Kong)	71–87	(Australia) Illawarra Hawks	Maba Stadium, Kuala Lumpur, Malaysia
NBL TV

3 October 2018	Illawarra Hawks (Australia)	79–68	(United States) Texas All-Stars	Maba Stadium, Kuala Lumpur, Malaysia
NBL TV

4 October 2018	Fubon Braves (Chinese Taipei)	83–85	(Australia) Illawarra Hawks	Maba Stadium, Kuala Lumpur, Malaysia
NBL TV

===== Semi-final =====
6 October 2018	Illawarra Hawks (Australia)	87–52	(Serbia) Partizan Belgrade B	Maba Stadium, Kuala Lumpur, Malaysia
NBL TV

===== Final =====
7 October 2018	KCC Egis (South Korea)	69–96	(Australia) Illawarra Hawks	Maba Stadium, Kuala Lumpur, Malaysia
NBL TV

Illawarra Hawks won the tournament.

=== Melbourne United pre-season ===
4 August 2018	Melbourne United	136–85	Taiwan	Melbourne Sports and Aquatic Centre, Melbourne
NBL TV

9 August 2018	Melbourne United	81–80	Saint Mary's College of California	State Basketball Centre, Melbourne
NBL TV				Attendance: 3,200

16 August 2018	Melbourne United	100–80	Loyola Marymount University	Casey Basketball Stadium, Melbourne
NBL TV				Attendance: 1,500

30 August 2018	Melbourne United	93–85	Sydney Kings	Bendigo Stadium, Bendigo
NBL TV				Attendance: 2,000

1 September 2018	Melbourne United	85–93	Sydney Kings	State Basketball Centre, Melbourne
NBL TV				Attendance: 3,200

11 September 2018	Melbourne United	89–88	Cairns Taipans	Dandenong Basketball Stadium, Melbourne
NBL TV		Box Score		Attendance: 1,000

13 September 2018	Melbourne United	75–78	Cairns Taipans	Melbourne Sports and Aquatic Centre, Melbourne
NBL TV

=== Perth Wildcats pre-season ===
7 September 2018	Perth Wildcats	100–61	Adelaide 36ers	Bendat Basketball Centre, Perth
NBL TV				Attendance: 2,000

9 September 2018	Perth Wildcats	84–66	Adelaide 36ers	HBF Arena, Perth
NBL TV				Attendance: 2,500

=== Sydney Kings pre-season ===
10 August 2018	Sydney Kings	77–57	Japan	University of Sydney, Sydney
Telegraph Sport

15 August 2018	Sydney Kings	84–56	Saint Mary's College of California	Scholastic Basketball Stadium, Terrigal
NBL TV				Attendance: 1,300

17 August 2018	Sydney Kings	82–65	University of Hawaii	TBC, Sydney
NBL TV

26 August 2018	Sydney Kings	79–52	Drexel University	Alexandria Basketball Stadium, Sydney
NBL TV				Attendance: 600

=== 2018 NBL Blitz ===
A pre-season tournament featuring all eight teams was held on 20–23 September 2018 in Bendigo and Ballarat. Bendigo Stadium hosted four games of the NBL Blitz on September 20 while Ballarat Minerdome hosted eight games from September 22–23. Both cities also hosted a range of community activities featuring NBL stars. The winners received the sixth annual Loggins-Bruton Cup.

==== Day 1 Bendigo Stadium ====
20 September 2018	Illawarra Hawks	91–69	Brisbane Bullets	Bendigo Stadium, Bendigo
NBL TV		Box Score

20 September 2018	Perth Wildcats	84–88	New Zealand Breakers	Bendigo Stadium, Bendigo
NBL TV		Box Score

20 September 2018	Melbourne United	87–97	Adelaide 36ers	Bendigo Stadium, Bendigo
NBL TV		Box Score

20 September 2018	Sydney Kings	75–60	Cairns Taipans	Bendigo Stadium, Bendigo
NBL TV		Box Score

==== Day 2 Ballarat Minerdome ====
22 September 2018	Cairns Taipans	78–99	Perth Wildcats	Ballarat Minerdome, Ballarat
NBL TV		Box Score

22 September 2018	Sydney Kings	91–98	Adelaide 36ers	Ballarat Minerdome, Ballarat
NBL TV		Box Score

22 September 2018	Illawarra Hawks	104–90	New Zealand Breakers	Ballarat Minerdome, Ballarat
NBL TV		Box Score

22 September 2018	Brisbane Bullets	90–96	Melbourne United	Ballarat Minerdome, Ballarat
NBL TV		Box Score

==== Day 3 Ballarat Minerdome ====
23 September 2018	New Zealand Breakers	89–96	Cairns Taipans	Ballarat Minerdome, Ballarat
NBL TV		Box Score

23 September 2018	Brisbane Bullets	70–60	Sydney Kings	Ballarat Minerdome, Ballarat
NBL TV		Box Score		Attendance: 500

23 September 2018	Adelaide 36ers	108–90	Perth Wildcats	Ballarat Minerdome, Ballarat
NBL TV		Box Score

23 September 2018	Melbourne United	88–82	Illawarra Hawks	Ballarat Minerdome, Ballarat
NBL TV		Box Score

The Adelaide 36ers won the 2018 NBL Blitz championship.

=== NBLxNBA 2018 Tour ===
Five NBL teams will play a total of seven games against NBA teams in the 2018 pre-season.

28 September 2018	Philadelphia 76ers	104–84	Melbourne United	Wells Fargo Center, Philadelphia, United States
ESPN		Box Score		Attendance: 6,325

29 September 2018	Utah Jazz	130–72	Perth Wildcats	Vivint Smart Home Arena, Salt Lake City, United States
ESPN2		Box Score		Attendance: 17,685

30 September 2018	Los Angeles Clippers	110–91	Sydney Kings	Stan Sheriff Center, Honolulu, United States
ESPN2		Box Score		Attendance: 6,911

3 October 2018	Phoenix Suns	91–86	New Zealand Breakers	Talking Stick Resort Arena, Phoenix, United States
ESPN2		Box Score		Attendance: 7,183

5 October 2018	Toronto Raptors	120–82	Melbourne United	Scotiabank Arena, Toronto, Canada
ESPN2		Box Score		Attendance: 15,781

5 October 2018	Denver Nuggets	96–88	Perth Wildcats	Pepsi Center, Denver, United States
ESPN2		Box Score		Attendance: 9,812

5 October 2018	Utah Jazz	129–99	Adelaide 36ers	Vivint Smart Home Arena, Salt Lake City, United States
9Go!		Box Score		Attendance: 18,074
