= 2014–15 NBL season =

Professional basketball season

- League: National Basketball League
- Season: 2014–15
- Dates: 10 October 2014 – 8 March 2015
- Teams: 8
- TV partners: Australia: Network Ten; One HD; New Zealand: Sky Sport; Online: NBL TV; LiveBasketball.TV

Regular season
- Season champions: Cairns Taipans
- Season MVP: (United States) Brian Conklin (Townsville)

Finals
- Champions: New Zealand Breakers (4th title)
- Runners-up: Cairns Taipans
- Semi-finalists: Adelaide 36ers Perth Wildcats
- Finals MVP: (United States) Cedric Jackson (New Zealand)

Statistical leaders
Points	(United States) Josh Childress (Sydney)	21.1
Rebounds	(United States) Josh Childress (Sydney)	9.2
Assists	(United States) Cedric Jackson (New Zealand)	6.0

NBL seasons
- ← 2013–14 2015–16 →

The 2014–15 NBL season was the 37th season of competition since its establishment in 1979. A total of eight teams contested the league. The regular season was played between 10 October 2014 and 22 February 2015, followed by a post-season featuring the top four in late February and March 2015.

Australian broadcast rights to the season are held by free-to-air network Channel Ten and its digital sports sister station One, in the final year of a five-year deal. In New Zealand, Sky Sport are the official league broadcaster, in the final year of a three-year deal.

During the off-season the Melbourne Tigers were rebranded as Melbourne United.

== Pre-season ==
=== Sydney Kings pre-season ===
8 August 2014	Sydney Kings	76–65	Eastern Kentucky University	Sutherland Basketball Stadium, Sydney
NBL TV

19 August 2014	Sydney Kings	100–86	University of Hartford	The King's School, Sydney
NBL TV

5 September 2014	Sydney Kings	98–85	Goyang Orions	Scholastic Sports Stadium, Terrigal
NBL TV

8 September 2014	Sydney Kings	91–70	Dongguan Leopards	Alexandria Basketball Stadium, Sydney
NBL TV

10 September 2014	Sydney Kings	107–88	Goyang Orions	The Brickpit Sports Stadium, Sydney
NBL TV

=== Wollongong Hawks pre-season ===
10 August 2014	Wollongong Hawks	106–99 (OT)	Eastern Kentucky University	Beaton Park Stadium, Wollongong
NBL TV

6 September 2014	Wollongong Hawks	91–62	Dongguan Leopards	Beaton Park Stadium, Wollongong
NBL TV

13 September 2014	Wollongong Hawks	88–97	Sydney Kings	Moss Vale Basketball Stadium, Moss Vale
NBL TV

=== Cairns Taipans pre-season ===
14 August 2014	Cairns Taipans	77–75	Eastern Kentucky University	Bendigo Bank Basketball Stadium, Cairns
NBL TV

26 August 2014	Cairns Taipans	113–80	University of Hartford	Bendigo Bank Basketball Stadium, Cairns
NBL TV

5 September 2014	Cairns Taipans	64–68	Melbourne United	Bendigo Bank Basketball Stadium, Cairns
NBL TV

7 September 2014	Cairns Taipans	61–85	Melbourne United	Bendigo Bank Basketball Stadium, Cairns
NBL TV

26 September 2014	Cairns Taipans	96–72	Wollongong Hawks	Bendigo Bank Basketball Stadium, Cairns
NBL TV

27 September 2014	Cairns Taipans	73–62	Wollongong Hawks	Bendigo Bank Basketball Stadium, Cairns
NBL TV

=== Melbourne United pre-season ===
15 August 2014	Melbourne United	101–93	Adelaide 36ers	Mars Minerdome, Ballarat
NBL TV

30 August 2014	Melbourne United	99–71	Townsville Crocodiles	Traralgon Sports Stadium, Traralgon
NBL TV

13 September 2014	Melbourne United	88–56	Dongguan Leopards	State Basketball Centre, Melbourne
NBL TV

=== Adelaide 36ers pre-season ===
31 August 2014	Adelaide 36ers	94–88	Townsville Crocodiles	Marrara Indoor Stadium, Darwin
NBL TV

2 September 2014	Adelaide 36ers	89–84	Japan	YMCA Palmerston Recreation Centre, Palmerston
NBL TV

4 September 2014	Adelaide 36ers	88–86	Japan	YMCA Palmerston Recreation Centre, Palmerston
NBL TV

25 September 2014	Adelaide 36ers	95–61	CABL All-Stars	Westminster School, Adelaide
NBL TV

=== Perth Wildcats pre-season ===
5 September 2014	Perth Wildcats	98–59	SBL All-Stars	Western Australian Basketball Centre, Perth
NBL TV				Attendance: 1,880

18 September 2014	Perth Wildcats	70–76	Sydney Kings	Cotton On Foundation Stadium, Ipswich
NBL TV

26 September 2014	Perth Wildcats	81–66	Melbourne United	Waroona Recreation Centre, Waroona
NBL TV

28 September 2014	Perth Wildcats	72–71	Melbourne United	Margaret River Recreation Centre, Margaret River
NBL TV

29 September 2014	Perth Wildcats	90–83	Melbourne United	Western Australian Basketball Centre, Perth
NBL TV

=== Townsville Crocodiles pre-season ===
6 September 2014	Townsville Crocodiles	110–98	Japan	Townsville RSL Stadium, Townsville
NBL TV

7 September 2014	Townsville Crocodiles	92–85	Japan	Townsville RSL Stadium, Townsville
NBL TV

12 September 2014	Townsville Crocodiles	76–68	Cairns Taipans	Townsville RSL Stadium, Townsville
NBL TV

=== New Zealand Breakers pre-season ===
30 September 2014	New Zealand Breakers	91–96	Sydney Kings	Horncastle Arena, Christchurch
NBL TV

2 October 2014	New Zealand Breakers	94–84	Sydney Kings	Edgar Centre, Dunedin
NBL TV

=== 2014 NBL Pre-Season Blitz ===
A pre-season tournament featuring all eight teams was held on 19–21 September 2014 at NAB Stadium, Brisbane. The winner will receive the second annual Loggins-Bruton Cup.

19 September 2014	Melbourne United	73–78	Townsville Crocodiles	NAB Stadium, Brisbane
NBL TV

19 September 2014	New Zealand Breakers	96–84	Adelaide 36ers	NAB Stadium, Brisbane
NBL TV

20 September 2014	Perth Wildcats	89–98	Cairns Taipans	NAB Stadium, Brisbane
NBL TV

20 September 2014	Sydney Kings	58–96	Melbourne United	NAB Stadium, Brisbane
NBL TV

20 September 2014	Adelaide 36ers	106–81	Wollongong Hawks	NAB Stadium, Brisbane
NBL TV

20 September 2014	Townsville Crocodiles	91–64	New Zealand Breakers	NAB Stadium, Brisbane
NBL TV

21 September 2014	Cairns Taipans	93–87	Sydney Kings	NAB Stadium, Brisbane
NBL TV

21 September 2014	Wollongong Hawks	60–79	Perth Wildcats	NAB Stadium, Brisbane
NBL TV

Townsville Crocodiles are pre-season champions.

== Regular season ==
=== Round 1 ===
10 October 2014	Wollongong Hawks	92–83	Townsville Crocodiles	WIN Entertainment Centre, Wollongong
NBL TV				Attendance: 3,277

10 October 2014	Adelaide 36ers	87–97	Cairns Taipans	Adelaide Arena, Adelaide
NBL TV				Attendance: 5,229

10 October 2014	Perth Wildcats	70–80	New Zealand Breakers	Perth Arena, Perth
One				Attendance: 12,903

11 October 2014	Sydney Kings	86–83	Wollongong Hawks	Qantas Credit Union Arena, Sydney
NBL TV				Attendance: 6,928

12 October 2014	Melbourne United	61–89	Cairns Taipans	Hisense Arena, Melbourne
Network Ten				Attendance: 5,704

12 October 2014	Townsville Crocodiles	83–97	Adelaide 36ers	Townsville RSL Stadium, Townsville
NBL TV				Attendance: 1,436

=== Round 2 ===
17 October 2014	New Zealand Breakers	101–80	Adelaide 36ers	Vector Arena, Auckland
Sky Sport				Attendance: 6,287

17 October 2014	Sydney Kings	81–86	Townsville Crocodiles	Qantas Credit Union Arena, Sydney
NBL TV				Attendance: 3,804

17 October 2014	Cairns Taipans	88–73	Melbourne United	Cairns Convention Centre, Cairns
NBL TV				Attendance: TBA

17 October 2014	Perth Wildcats	69–59	Wollongong Hawks	Perth Arena, Perth
One				Attendance: 11,586

19 October 2014	Melbourne United	95–74	New Zealand Breakers	Hisense Arena, Melbourne
One				Attendance: 3,978

19 October 2014	Wollongong Hawks	89–91	Cairns Taipans	WIN Entertainment Centre, Wollongong
NBL TV				Attendance: 2,716

=== Round 3 ===
23 October 2014	New Zealand Breakers	76–85	Cairns Taipans	North Shore Events Centre, Auckland
Sky Sport				Attendance: 2,872

23 October 2014	Adelaide 36ers	94–73	Wollongong Hawks	Adelaide Arena, Adelaide
NBL TV				Attendance: 4,176

24 October 2014	Perth Wildcats	84–63	Sydney Kings	Perth Arena, Perth
One				Attendance: 12,469

25 October 2014	Townsville Crocodiles	92–81	Melbourne United	Townsville RSL Stadium, Townsville
NBL TV				Attendance: 1,496

26 October 2014	Wollongong Hawks	77–79	New Zealand Breakers	WIN Entertainment Centre, Wollongong
Network Ten				Attendance: 2,400

=== Round 4 ===
31 October 2014	New Zealand Breakers	84–70	Townsville Crocodiles	Vector Arena, Auckland
Sky Sport				Attendance: 6,106

31 October 2014	Wollongong Hawks	64–83	Perth Wildcats	WIN Entertainment Centre, Wollongong
One				Attendance: 2,376

1 November 2014	Cairns Taipans	74–62	Sydney Kings	Cairns Convention Centre, Cairns
NBL TV				Attendance: 4,562

2 November 2014	Melbourne United	88–75	Wollongong Hawks	Hisense Arena, Melbourne
NBL TV				Attendance: 5,451

2 November 2014	Adelaide 36ers	93–86	New Zealand Breakers	Adelaide Arena, Adelaide
Network Ten				Attendance: 4,832

2 November 2014	Townsville Crocodiles	102–80	Perth Wildcats	Townsville RSL Stadium, Townsville
NBL TV				Attendance: 1,412

=== Round 5 ===
7 November 2014	Wollongong Hawks	53–82	Sydney Kings	WIN Entertainment Centre, Wollongong
One				Attendance: 2,475

7 November 2014	Cairns Taipans	71–79	New Zealand Breakers	Cairns Convention Centre, Cairns
NBL TV				Attendance: 4,467

9 November 2014	Sydney Kings	107–100	Adelaide 36ers	Qantas Credit Union Arena, Sydney
Network Ten				Attendance: 4,602

9 November 2014	Perth Wildcats	68–59	Melbourne United	Perth Arena, Perth
NBL TV				Attendance: 11,231

9 November 2014	Townsville Crocodiles	80–87	New Zealand Breakers	Townsville RSL Stadium, Townsville
NBL TV				Attendance: 1,552

=== Round 6 ===
12 November 2014	Melbourne United	91–76	Cairns Taipans	Margaret Court Arena, Melbourne
NBL TV				Attendance: 3,393

14 November 2014	New Zealand Breakers	71–55	Wollongong Hawks	Vector Arena, Auckland
Sky Sport				Attendance: 4,708

14 November 2014	Perth Wildcats	93–78	Townsville Crocodiles	Perth Arena, Perth
One				Attendance: 12,877

15 November 2014	Adelaide 36ers	79–118	Melbourne United	Adelaide Arena, Adelaide
NBL TV				Attendance: 6,528

16 November 2014	Sydney Kings	66–85	Perth Wildcats	Qantas Credit Union Arena, Sydney
Network Ten				Attendance: 5,766

=== Round 7 ===
20 November 2014	Sydney Kings	93–76	Cairns Taipans	Qantas Credit Union Arena, Sydney
NBL TV				Attendance: 3,752

21 November 2014	New Zealand Breakers	80–72	Melbourne United	Vector Arena, Auckland
Sky Sport				Attendance: 4,643

21 November 2014	Adelaide 36ers	74–84	Perth Wildcats	Adelaide Arena, Adelaide
One				Attendance: 5,058

22 November 2014	Cairns Taipans	69–65	Wollongong Hawks	Cairns Convention Centre, Cairns
NBL TV				Attendance: 3,807

23 November 2014	Melbourne United	91–76	Perth Wildcats	Hisense Arena, Melbourne
Network Ten				Attendance: 5,233

23 November 2014	Townsville Crocodiles	107–75	Wollongong Hawks	Townsville RSL Stadium, Townsville
NBL TV				Attendance: 1,370

=== Round 8 ===
27 November 2014	Melbourne United	94–91	Adelaide 36ers	Hisense Arena, Melbourne
NBL TV				Attendance: 3,407

28 November 2014	New Zealand Breakers	107–96	Sydney Kings	Vector Arena, Auckland
Sky Sport				Attendance: 4,951

28 November 2014	Wollongong Hawks	90–76	Townsville Crocodiles	WIN Entertainment Centre, Wollongong
NBL TV				Attendance: 2,200

28 November 2014	Perth Wildcats	84–66	Cairns Taipans	Perth Arena, Perth
One				Attendance: 11,652

30 November 2014	Adelaide 36ers	83–90	Sydney Kings	Adelaide Arena, Adelaide
Network Ten				Attendance: 4,708

30 November 2014	Cairns Taipans	91–82	Townsville Crocodiles	Cairns Convention Centre, Cairns
NBL TV				Attendance: TBA

=== Round 9 ===
5 December 2014	Townsville Crocodiles	96–84	Adelaide 36ers	Townsville RSL Stadium, Townsville
NBL TV				Attendance: 1,389

5 December 2014	Perth Wildcats	79–55	Wollongong Hawks	Perth Arena, Perth
One				Attendance: 11,429

6 December 2014	Sydney Kings	82–69	New Zealand Breakers	Qantas Credit Union Arena, Sydney
NBL TV				Attendance: 4,908

6 December 2014	Cairns Taipans	85–80	Adelaide 36ers	Cairns Convention Centre, Cairns
NBL TV				Attendance: 3,621

7 December 2014	Melbourne United	83–79	Townsville Crocodiles	Margaret Court Arena, Melbourne
Network Ten				Attendance: 4,420

=== Round 10 ===
11 December 2014	New Zealand Breakers	77–66	Perth Wildcats	Vector Arena, Auckland
Sky Sport				Attendance: 5,235

12 December 2014	Adelaide 36ers	90–77	Melbourne United	Adelaide Arena, Adelaide
One				Attendance: 4,278

12 December 2014	Cairns Taipans	77–61	Townsville Crocodiles	Cairns Convention Centre, Cairns
NBL TV				Attendance: TBA

13 December 2014	Wollongong Hawks	82–77	Sydney Kings	WIN Entertainment Centre, Wollongong
NBL TV				Attendance: 2,228

14 December 2014	Melbourne United	87–92	New Zealand Breakers	Hisense Arena, Melbourne
Network Ten				Attendance: 5,768

14 December 2014	Perth Wildcats	97–76	Adelaide 36ers	Perth Arena, Perth
NBL TV				Attendance: 11,731

=== Round 11 ===
18 December 2014	Sydney Kings	78–74	Perth Wildcats	Qantas Credit Union Arena, Sydney
NBL TV				Attendance: 4,292

19 December 2014	New Zealand Breakers	96–84	Townsville Crocodiles	North Shore Events Centre, Auckland
Sky Sport				Attendance: 3,719

19 December 2014	Wollongong Hawks	98–103 (OT)	Melbourne United	WIN Entertainment Centre, Wollongong
One				Attendance: 1,723

19 December 2014	Adelaide 36ers	90–86	Cairns Taipans	Adelaide Arena, Adelaide
NBL TV				Attendance: 4,798

21 December 2014	Melbourne United	105–101 (OT)	Sydney Kings	Margaret Court Arena, Melbourne
Network Ten				Attendance: 5,377

21 December 2014	Cairns Taipans	83–59	New Zealand Breakers	Cairns Convention Centre, Cairns
NBL TV				Attendance: 3,740

=== Round 12 ===
26 December 2014	Sydney Kings	85–97	New Zealand Breakers	Qantas Credit Union Arena, Sydney
One				Attendance: 4,541

27 December 2014	Wollongong Hawks	93–100	Cairns Taipans	WIN Entertainment Centre, Wollongong
NBL TV				Attendance: 2,117

27 December 2014	Adelaide 36ers	91–84	Townsville Crocodiles	Adelaide Arena, Adelaide
NBL TV				Attendance: 7,443

28 December 2014	Melbourne United	80–81 (OT)	Perth Wildcats	Hisense Arena, Melbourne
Network Ten				Attendance: 6,754

=== Round 13 ===
31 December 2014	Wollongong Hawks	77–86	Perth Wildcats	WIN Entertainment Centre, Wollongong
NBL TV				Attendance: 2,445

31 December 2014	Cairns Taipans	77–84 (OT)	Adelaide 36ers	Cairns Convention Centre, Cairns
NBL TV				Attendance: 5,011

31 December 2014	Townsville Crocodiles	93–92	Sydney Kings	Townsville RSL Stadium, Townsville
NBL TV				Attendance: 1,885

2 January 2015	Sydney Kings	68–82	Melbourne United	Qantas Credit Union Arena, Sydney
One				Attendance: TBA

3 January 2015	Townsville Crocodiles	75–79	Cairns Taipans	Townsville RSL Stadium, Townsville
NBL TV				Attendance: 1,705

4 January 2015	Adelaide 36ers	74–81	New Zealand Breakers	Adelaide Arena, Adelaide
Network Ten				Attendance: 5,552

=== Round 14 ===
8 January 2015	New Zealand Breakers	98–91 (OT)	Wollongong Hawks	North Shore Events Centre, Auckland
Sky Sport				Attendance: 3,992

9 January 2015	Sydney Kings	89–98	Townsville Crocodiles	Qantas Credit Union Arena, Sydney
One				Attendance: TBA

9 January 2015	Cairns Taipans	91–76	Perth Wildcats	Cairns Convention Centre, Cairns
NBL TV				Attendance: TBA

10 January 2015	Melbourne United	89–91	Adelaide 36ers	State Netball and Hockey Centre, Melbourne
NBL TV				Attendance: 3,500

11 January 2015	Wollongong Hawks	84–86	New Zealand Breakers	WIN Entertainment Centre, Wollongong
One				Attendance: 2,080

11 January 2015	Townsville Crocodiles	73–78	Cairns Taipans	Townsville RSL Stadium, Townsville
NBL TV				Attendance: 1,645

=== Round 15 ===
16 January 2015	Townsville Crocodiles	81–89	Sydney Kings	Townsville RSL Stadium, Townsville
NBL TV				Attendance: TBA

16 January 2015	Perth Wildcats	102–106	Adelaide 36ers	Perth Arena, Perth
One				Attendance: 13,559

17 January 2015	Cairns Taipans	80–76	Sydney Kings	Cairns Convention Centre, Cairns
NBL TV				Attendance: 4,128

18 January 2015	New Zealand Breakers	88–75	Melbourne United	Vector Arena, Auckland
Sky Sport				Attendance: 6,001

18 January 2015	Adelaide 36ers	83–78	Wollongong Hawks	Adelaide Arena, Adelaide
Network Ten				Attendance: 6,022

21 January 2015	Perth Wildcats	78–86	Melbourne United	Perth Arena, Perth
NBL TV				Attendance: 13,316

=== Round 16 ===
23 January 2015	New Zealand Breakers	81–101	Sydney Kings	Vector Arena, Auckland
Sky Sport				Attendance: TBA

23 January 2015	Wollongong Hawks	85–89	Adelaide 36ers	WIN Entertainment Centre, Wollongong
One				Attendance: 2,200

23 January 2015	Townsville Crocodiles	85–93 (OT)	Perth Wildcats	Townsville RSL Stadium, Townsville
NBL TV				Attendance: TBA

24 January 2015	Cairns Taipans	92–66	Perth Wildcats	Cairns Convention Centre, Cairns
NBL TV				Attendance: TBA

25 January 2015	Sydney Kings	86–105	Adelaide 36ers	Qantas Credit Union Arena, Sydney
Network Ten				Attendance: TBA

25 January 2015	Melbourne United	69–81	Townsville Crocodiles	State Netball and Hockey Centre, Melbourne
NBL TV				Attendance: 3,500

=== Round 17 ===
29 January 2015	New Zealand Breakers	90–79	Perth Wildcats	North Shore Events Centre, Auckland
Sky Sport				Attendance: 3,605

30 January 2015	Wollongong Hawks	93–82	Melbourne United	WIN Entertainment Centre, Wollongong
One				Attendance: 2,033

1 February 2015	Adelaide 36ers	84–77	Townsville Crocodiles	Adelaide Arena, Adelaide
Network Ten				Attendance: 6,372

1 February 2015	Cairns Taipans	63–60	Wollongong Hawks	Cairns Convention Centre, Cairns
NBL TV				Attendance: 4,015

1 February 2015	Perth Wildcats	80–61	Sydney Kings	Perth Arena, Perth
NBL TV				Attendance: 12,711

=== Round 18 ===
6 February 2015	Adelaide 36ers	97–78	Sydney Kings	Adelaide Arena, Adelaide
NBL TV				Attendance: 5,848

6 February 2015	Perth Wildcats	65–54	Cairns Taipans	Perth Arena, Perth
One				Attendance: 12,266

7 February 2015	Melbourne United	76–82	Wollongong Hawks	Margaret Court Arena, Melbourne
NBL TV				Attendance: 6,741

7 February 2015	Townsville Crocodiles	79–71	New Zealand Breakers	Townsville RSL Stadium, Townsville
NBL TV				Attendance: TBA

8 February 2015	Sydney Kings	78–92	Cairns Taipans	Qantas Credit Union Arena, Sydney
Network Ten				Attendance: TBA

=== Round 19 ===
12 February 2015	New Zealand Breakers	88–93	Adelaide 36ers	Vector Arena, Auckland
Sky Sport				Attendance: 4,514

13 February 2015	Cairns Taipans	84–62	Melbourne United	Cairns Convention Centre, Cairns
One				Attendance: 4,737

14 February 2015	Townsville Crocodiles	105–68	Melbourne United	Townsville RSL Stadium, Townsville
NBL TV				Attendance: TBA

15 February 2015	Sydney Kings	73–75	Wollongong Hawks	Qantas Credit Union Arena, Sydney
Network Ten				Attendance: 4,487

15 February 2015	Perth Wildcats	87–89 (2OT)	New Zealand Breakers	Perth Arena, Perth
NBL TV				Attendance: 13,241

=== Round 20 ===
20 February 2015	Sydney Kings	88–91	Melbourne United	Qantas Credit Union Arena, Sydney
One				Attendance: 5,547

20 February 2015	Adelaide 36ers	101–94	Perth Wildcats	Adelaide Arena, Adelaide
NBL TV				Attendance: 7,054

20 February 2015	Townsville Crocodiles	82–66	Wollongong Hawks	Townsville RSL Stadium, Townsville
NBL TV				Attendance: TBA

22 February 2015	Melbourne United	95–92	Sydney Kings	Hisense Arena, Melbourne
Network Ten				Attendance: 10,300

22 February 2015	New Zealand Breakers	77–81	Cairns Taipans	Vector Arena, Auckland
Sky Sport				Attendance: 7,108

22 February 2015	Perth Wildcats	81–71	Townsville Crocodiles	Perth Arena, Perth
NBL TV				Attendance: 12,659

22 February 2015	Wollongong Hawks	85–105	Adelaide 36ers	WIN Entertainment Centre, Wollongong
NBL TV				Attendance: 2,366

== Ladder ==
The Cairns Taipans became the first regional centre team to win the minor premiership since the Geelong Cats did so in 1984.

Pos	2014–15 NBL season											
Pos	Team	Pld	W	L	PCT	Last 5	Streak	Home	Away	PF	PA	PP
1	Cairns Taipans	28	21	7	75.00%	4–1	W3	12–2	9–5	2275	2117	107.46%
2	New Zealand Breakers	28	19	9	67.86%	2–3	L1	10–4	9–5	2343	2275	102.99%
3	Adelaide 36ers	28	17	11	60.71%	5–0	W10	9–5	8–6	2501	2478	100.93%
4	Perth Wildcats	28	16	12	57.14%	3–2	W1	10–4	6–8	2260	2171	104.10%
5	Melbourne United	28	13	15	46.43%	2–3	W2	8–6	5–9	2333	2379	98.07%
6	Townsville Crocodiles	28	11	17	39.29%	3–2	L1	8–6	3–11	2343	2341	100.09%
7	Sydney Kings	28	9	19	32.14%	0–5	L7	5–9	4–10	2320	2408	96.35%
8	Wollongong Hawks	28	6	22	21.43%	2–3	L2	4–10	2–12	2154	2360	91.27%

Updated to match(es) played on 22 February 2015. Source: NBL.com.au

=== Ladder Progression ===
- Numbers highlighted in green indicate that the team finished the round inside the top four.
- Numbers highlighted in blue indicates the team finished first on the ladder in that round.
- Numbers highlighted in red indicates the team finished last place on the ladder in that round.

2014–15 NBL season
Team	1	2	3	4	5	6	7	8	9	10	11	12	13	14	15	16	17	18	19	20
Adelaide 36ers	5	5	4	3	4	6	7	7	7	7	7	6	6	5	5	4	4	4	4	3
Cairns Taipans	1	1	1	1	1	2	3	3	3	3	2	2	3	2	2	1	1	1	1	1
Melbourne United	8	7	7	6	7	4	4	4	4	4	4	4	4	4	4	5	5	5	5	5
New Zealand Breakers	2	2	3	4	3	3	1	1	2	1	1	1	1	1	1	2	2	2	2	2
Perth Wildcats	7	3	2	2	2	1	2	2	1	2	3	3	2	3	3	3	3	3	3	4
Sydney Kings	3	4	6	7	5	5	5	5	5	5	5	5	5	6	6	6	6	7	7	7
Townsville Crocodiles	6	6	5	5	6	7	6	6	6	6	6	7	7	7	7	7	7	6	6	6
Wollongong Hawks	4	8	8	8	8	8	8	8	8	8	8	8	8	8	8	8	8	8	8	8

== Finals ==
The 2014–15 National Basketball League Finals will be played in February and March 2015, consisting of two best-of-three semi-final and final series, where the higher seed hosts the first and third games.

=== Playoff Seedings ===
1. Cairns Taipans
2. New Zealand Breakers
3. Adelaide 36ers
4. Perth Wildcats

The NBL tie-breaker system as outlined in the NBL Rules and Regulations states that in the case of an identical win–loss record, the results in games played between the teams will determine order of seeding.

=== Playoff bracket ===
Semifinals
1	Cairns Taipans	71	80	X
4	Perth Wildcats	64	66	X
2	New Zealand Breakers	111	94	X
3	Adelaide 36ers	82	83	X

Grand Final
1	Cairns Taipans	71	81	X
2	New Zealand Breakers	86	83	X

=== Semi-finals ===
26 February 2015	New Zealand Breakers	111–82	Adelaide 36ers	Vector Arena, Auckland
One				Attendance: 3,833

27 February 2015	Cairns Taipans	71–64	Perth Wildcats	Cairns Convention Centre, Cairns
One				Attendance: TBA

28 February 2015	Adelaide 36ers	83–94	New Zealand Breakers	Adelaide Arena, Adelaide
One				Attendance: 4,807

1 March 2015	Perth Wildcats	68–80	Cairns Taipans	Perth Arena, Perth
One				Attendance: 8,703

=== Grand final ===
6 March 2015	Cairns Taipans	71–86	New Zealand Breakers	Cairns Convention Centre, Cairns
One				Attendance: 5,300

8 March 2015	New Zealand Breakers	83–81	Cairns Taipans	North Shore Events Centre, Auckland
Network Ten				Attendance: 4,400

== Season statistics ==
=== Statistics leaders ===
Category	Player	Games played	Totals	Average
Points per game	Josh Childress (Sydney Kings)	18	379	21.1
Rebounds per game	Josh Childress (Sydney Kings)	18	166	9.2
Assists per game	Cedric Jackson (New Zealand Breakers)	28	167	6.0
Steals per game	Damian Martin (Perth Wildcats)	28	73	2.6
Blocks per game	Mickell Gladness (Townsville Crocodiles)	27	60	2.2
Field goal percentage	Ekene Ibekwe (New Zealand Breakers)	28	127-218	58.3%
Three-point field goal percentage	Daniel Kickert (Melbourne United)	28	49-96	51.0%
Free throw percentage	Stephen Weigh (Cairns Taipans)	28	34-38	89.5%

Note: regular season only (minimum 14 games) and excluding negligible attempts

=== Top 10 Attendances ===
Attendance	Round	Date	Home	Score	Away	Venue	Weekday	Time of Day
13,559	15	16 January 2015	Perth Wildcats	102-106	Adelaide 36ers	Perth Arena	Friday	Night
13,316	15	21 January 2015	Perth Wildcats	78-86	Melbourne United	Perth Arena	Wednesday	Night
13,241	19	15 February 2015	Perth Wildcats	87-89 (2OT)	New Zealand Breakers	Perth Arena	Sunday	Afternoon
12,903	1	10 October 2014	Perth Wildcats	70-80	New Zealand Breakers	Perth Arena	Friday	Night
12,877	6	14 November 2014	Perth Wildcats	93-78	Townsville Crocodiles	Perth Arena	Friday	Night
12,711	17	1 February 2015	Perth Wildcats	80-61	Sydney Kings	Perth Arena	Sunday	Afternoon
12,659	20	22 February 2015	Perth Wildcats	81-71	Townsville Crocodiles	Perth Arena	Sunday	Afternoon
12,469	3	24 October 2014	Perth Wildcats	84-63	Sydney Kings	Perth Arena	Friday	Night
12,266	18	6 February 2015	Perth Wildcats	65-54	Cairns Taipans	Perth Arena	Friday	Night
11,731	10	14 December 2014	Perth Wildcats	97-76	Adelaide 36ers	Perth Arena	Sunday	Afternoon

== Awards ==
=== Player of the Week ===
Round	Player	Team
1	Scottie Wilbekin	Cairns Taipans
2	Stephen Weigh	Cairns Taipans
3	Damian Martin	Perth Wildcats
4	Adam Gibson	Adelaide 36ers
5	Josh Childress	Sydney Kings
6	Jermaine Beal	Perth Wildcats
7	Corey Webster	New Zealand Breakers
8	DeAndre Daniels	Perth Wildcats
9	Torrey Craig	Cairns Taipans
10	Cedric Jackson	New Zealand Breakers
11	Jordan McRae	Melbourne United
12	Tai Wesley	New Zealand Breakers
13	Brian Conklin	Townsville Crocodiles
14	Jamar Wilson	Adelaide 36ers
15	Brock Motum	Adelaide 36ers
16	Todd Blanchfield	Townsville Crocodiles
17	Jamar Wilson	Adelaide 36ers
18	Todd Blanchfield	Townsville Crocodiles
19	Cedric Jackson	New Zealand Breakers
20	Scottie Wilbekin	Cairns Taipans

=== Player of the Month ===
Month	Player	Team
October	Scottie Wilbekin	Cairns Taipans
November	Josh Childress	Sydney Kings
December	Jordan McRae	Melbourne United
January	Brock Motum	Adelaide 36ers
February	Cedric Jackson	New Zealand Breakers

=== Coach of the Month ===
Month	Player	Team
October	Aaron Fearne	Cairns Taipans
November	Dean Vickerman	New Zealand Breakers
December	Dean Vickerman	New Zealand Breakers
January	Joey Wright	Adelaide 36ers
February	Joey Wright	Adelaide 36ers

=== Pre-season ===
- Most Valuable Player (Ray Borner Medal): Mickell Gladness, Townsville Crocodiles

=== Season ===
- Most Valuable Player (Andrew Gaze Trophy): Brian Conklin, Townsville Crocodiles
- Rookie of the Year: Angus Brandt, Sydney Kings
- Best Defensive Player: Damian Martin, Perth Wildcats
- Best Sixth Man: Cameron Tragardh, Cairns Taipans
- Most Improved Player: Todd Blanchfield, Townsville Crocodiles
- Coach of the Year (Lindsay Gaze Trophy): Aaron Fearne, Cairns Taipans
- Referee of the Year: Michael Aylen
- All-NBL First Team:
  - Cedric Jackson – New Zealand Breakers
  - Scottie Wilbekin – Cairns Taipans
  - Josh Childress – Sydney Kings
  - Brock Motum – Adelaide 36ers
  - Brian Conklin – Townsville Crocodiles
- All-NBL Second Team:
  - Jamar Wilson – Adelaide 36ers
  - Jordan McRae – Melbourne United
  - Todd Blanchfield – Townsville Crocodiles
  - Ekene Ibekwe – New Zealand Breakers
  - Matthew Knight – Perth Wildcats

=== Finals ===
- Grand Final Series MVP (Larry Sengstock Medal): Cedric Jackson, New Zealand Breakers
