= 2013–14 New Zealand Breakers season =

- Head coach: Dean Vickerman
- Captain: Mika Vukona
- Arena: Vector Arena; North Shore Events Centre

NBL results
- Record: 11–17 (39.3%)
- Ladder: 7th
- Finals finish: Did not qualify
- Stats at NBL.com.au

The 2013–14 NBL season was the 11th season of the New Zealand Breakers in the NBL. Winning the 2012–13 season, they were the defending champions for the third season in a row. Despite success in the previous three seasons, the departure of coach Andrej Lemanis during the off-season, coupled with the loss of key players, the Breakers failed to return to the playoffs, staying mid-table for most of the season and finishing in seventh of eight teams.

== Pre-season ==
Date	Home team	Score	Away team	Venue	Attendance
10 September 2013	New Zealand Breakers	80-83	Melbourne Tigers	CBS Canterbury Arena, Christchurch	6,400
12 September 2013	New Zealand Breakers	76-94	Melbourne Tigers	TSB Bank Arena, Wellington	3,200
20 September 2013	New Zealand Breakers	64-91	Perth Wildcats	Northern Suburbs Indoor Sports Centre, Sydney	Unknown
21 September 2013	Sydney Kings	97-93	New Zealand Breakers	Northern Suburbs Indoor Sports Centre, Sydney	Unknown
29 September 2013	New Zealand Breakers	114-93	Dongguan Leopards	TSB Stadium, New Plymouth	2,264
1 October 2013	New Zealand Breakers	82-81	Dongguan Leopards	Claudelands Arena, Hamilton	3,014
3 October 2013	New Zealand Breakers	86-80	Dongguan Leopards	Vector Arena, Auckland	7,011

== Regular season ==
Round	Date	Home team	Score	Away team	Venue	Attendance
1	10 October 2013	New Zealand Breakers	92-73	Wollongong Hawks	Vector Arena, Auckland	6,087
2	18 October 2013	Townsville Crocodiles	94-84	New Zealand Breakers	Townsville Entertainment Centre, Townsville	2,905
	19 October 2013	Cairns Taipans	86-85	New Zealand Breakers	Cairns Convention Centre, Cairns	4,747
3	24 October 2013	New Zealand Breakers	89-96	Perth Wildcats	North Shore Events Centre, Auckland	3,460
4	31 October 2013	New Zealand Breakers	93-96	Adelaide 36ers	North Shore Events Centre, Auckland	3,175
	3 November 2013	Wollongong Hawks	89-97	New Zealand Breakers	WIN Entertainment Centre, Wollongong	2,132
5	8 November 2013	Townsville Crocodiles	91-78	New Zealand Breakers	Townsville Entertainment Centre, Townsville	3,170
6	15 November 2013	New Zealand Breakers	94-95	Adelaide 36ers	Vector Arena, Auckland	7,470
7	22 November 2013	New Zealand Breakers	81-74	Townsville Crocodiles	North Shore Events Centre, Auckland	3,405
8	28 November 2013	New Zealand Breakers	84-74	Melbourne Tigers	North Shore Events Centre, Auckland	3,211
9	6 December 2013	Perth Wildcats	95-91	New Zealand Breakers	Perth Arena, Perth	11,373
	8 December 2013	Melbourne Tigers	84-82	New Zealand Breakers	State Netball and Hockey Centre, Melbourne	3,500
10	13 December 2013	New Zealand Breakers	62-71	Perth Wildcats	Vector Arena, Auckland	7,597
11	29 December 2013	Sydney Kings	83-99	New Zealand Breakers	Sydney Entertainment Centre, Sydney	5,655
12	4 January 2014	Adelaide 36ers	99-73	New Zealand Breakers	Adelaide Arena, Adelaide	6,676
13	10 January 2014	Melbourne Tigers	87-93	New Zealand Breakers	State Netball and Hockey Centre, Melbourne	3,500
14	17 January 2014	Perth Wildcats	95-73	New Zealand Breakers	Perth Arena, Perth	13,206
15	23 January 2014	New Zealand Breakers	106-101	Wollongong Hawks	North Shore Events Centre, Auckland	3,526
16	30 January 2014	New Zealand Breakers	105-87	Sydney Kings	Vector Arena, Auckland	6,052
17	8 February 2014	Sydney Kings	98-96	New Zealand Breakers	Sydney Entertainment Centre, Sydney	4,736
18	14 February 2014	New Zealand Breakers	96-78	Cairns Taipans	Vector Arena, Auckland	6,442
19	21 February 2014	Wollongong Hawks	88-68	New Zealand Breakers	WIN Entertainment Centre, Wollongong	2,444
	23 February 2014	Adelaide 36ers	96-92	New Zealand Breakers	Adelaide Arena, Adelaide	6,011
20	27 February 2014	New Zealand Breakers	102-99	Townsville Crocodiles	North Shore Events Centre, Auckland	3,315
	1 March 2014	Cairns Taipans	92-87	New Zealand Breakers	Cairns Convention Centre, Cairns	3,823
21	7 March 2014	New Zealand Breakers	84-97	Melbourne Tigers	Vector Arena, Auckland	6,808
22	13 March 2014	New Zealand Breakers	106-78	Sydney Kings	North Shore Events Centre, Auckland	3,279
23	21 March 2014	New Zealand Breakers	83-95	Cairns Taipans	Vector Arena, Auckland	7,947

== Finals ==
Despite winning the previous three championships and having the fourth best points percentage in the competition, the Breakers failed to make the Playoffs for the first time since 2010.
