= Luke Travers =

Australian basketball player (born 2001)

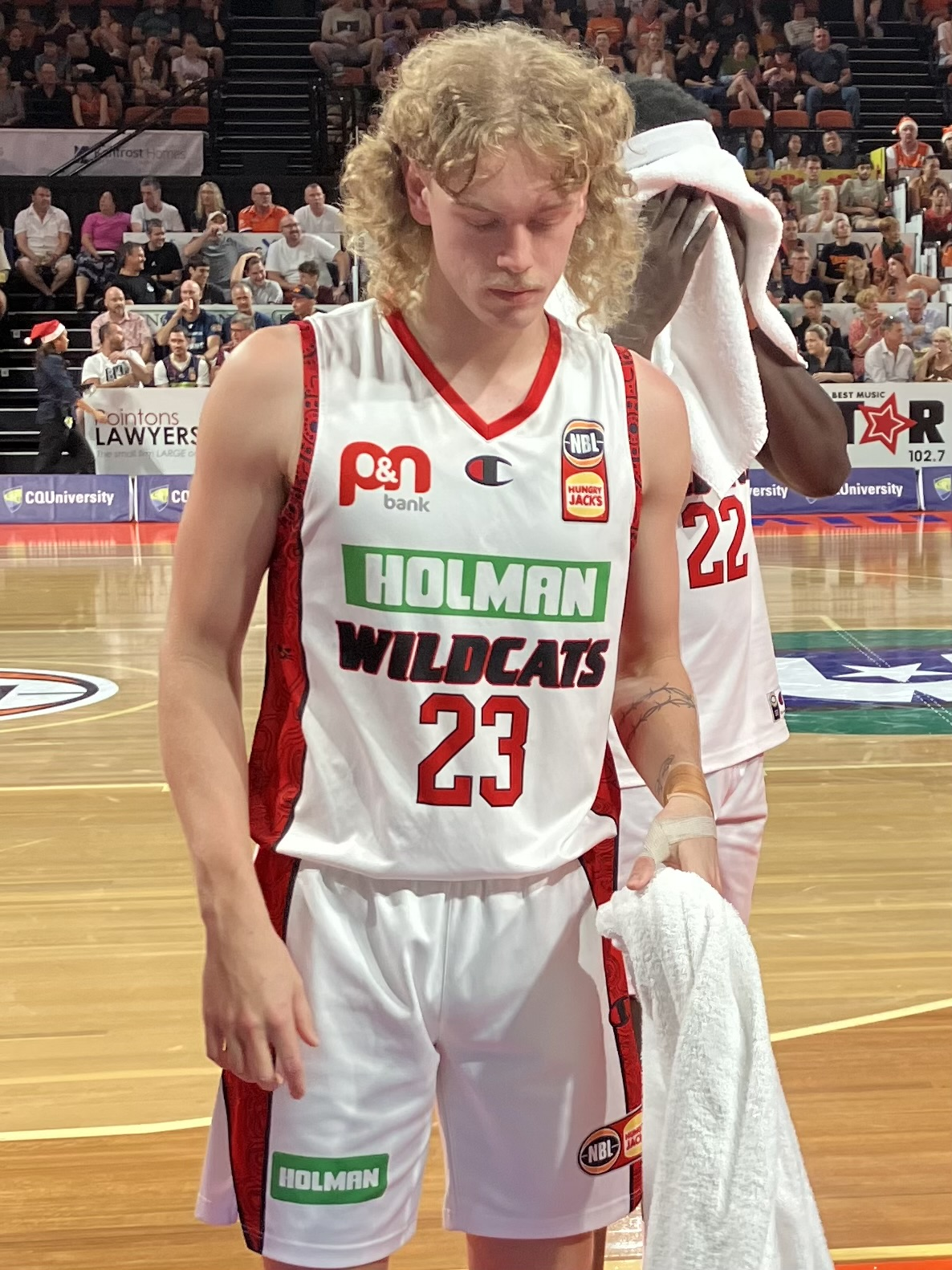
- Travers with the Perth Wildcats in 2022

No. 23 – Melbourne United
- Position: Small forward / shooting guard
- League: NBL

Personal information
- Born: 3 September 2001 (age 25) Perth, Western Australia, Australia
- Listed height: 201 cm (6 ft 7 in)
- Listed weight: 101 kg (223 lb)

Career information
- High school: Willetton Senior (Perth, Western Australia)
- NBA draft: 2022: 2nd round, 56th overall pick
- Drafted by: Cleveland Cavaliers
- Playing career: 2017–present

Career history
- 2017–2019: Rockingham Flames
- 2019–2023: Perth Wildcats
- 2020: Cockburn Cougars
- 2023–2024: Melbourne United
- 2024–2026: Cleveland Cavaliers
- 2024–2026: →Cleveland Charge
- 2026–present: Melbourne United

Career highlights
- NBL champion (2020); NBL Cup winner (2021); SBL Most Improved Player (2019)
- Stats at NBA.com
- Stats at Basketball Reference
Medals
Men's basketball
Representing Australia
FIBA Asia Under-16 Championship
Gold medal – first place	2017 China	Team

Luke Jacob Travers (born 3 September 2001) is an Australian professional basketball player for Melbourne United of the National Basketball League (NBL). After playing for the Rockingham Flames in the State Basketball League (SBL), Travers opted to forgo college basketball in the United States to begin his professional career in Australia. He made his debut for the Perth Wildcats in the NBL in 2019 and went on to be selected by the Cleveland Cavaliers with the 56th overall pick in the 2022 NBA draft. After a season with Melbourne United in 2023–24, he joined the Cavaliers in 2024 on a two-way contract with the Cleveland Charge of the NBA G League, where he spent two seasons. In 2026, he re-joined Melbourne United.

== Early life and career ==
Travers was born in Perth, Western Australia, in the suburb of Rockingham. After finishing at Port Kennedy Primary School, he enrolled at Willetton Senior High School to take advantage of the basketball program. He played at the Australian Schools Championships in 2017 and 2018. Travers was childhood friends with AFL player Luke Jackson, with the pair both playing for the basketball team at Willetton Senior High School.

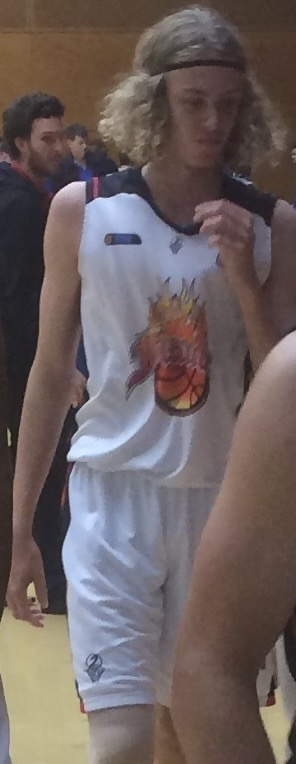
Travers in 2017

Travers grew up playing domestic basketball in Rockingham. He made his debut for the Rockingham Flames of the State Basketball League (SBL) during the 2017 SBL season. He saw action in five games and totaled five points. In the 2018 SBL season, he played five games during the regular season and then all five games during the finals, helping the Flames sweep the Geraldton Buccaneers 2–0 in the quarter-finals and averaging 14.7 points during the 2–1 semi-final series loss to the Perry Lakes Hawks. In the 2019 SBL season, he played 18 games for the Flames and averaged 11.7 points, 5.2 rebounds and 2.3 assists per game. He was an integral player for the Flames in 2019, starting a number of games but often used as the sixth man off the bench. He was subsequently named the SBL Most Improved Player.

In 2018, Travers helped break a 17-year drought for Western Australia, winning gold at the Under 18 National Championships.

== Professional career ==
=== Perth Wildcats (2019–2023) ===
==== 2019–20 season ====
On 1 August 2019, Travers signed with the Perth Wildcats as a development player for the 2019–20 NBL season. His elite athleticism and ability to play multiple positions made him an attractive option for the Wildcats. Regarded as one of Australia's most sought-after basketball prospects, he had interest from a number of colleges in the United States, but indicated his desire to turn professional due to a lack of motivation at school. In his debut for the Wildcats on 1 December 2019, he had three points, four assists and two rebounds in roughly 11 minutes in a 99–88 loss to the Adelaide 36ers. On 20 December 2019, he opted to forgo college basketball and begin his professional career, signing a three-year contract extension with the Wildcats. He played four games during the season and was a member of the Wildcats' championship-winning squad in March 2020.

Travers joined the Cockburn Cougars in 2020, where he averaged 17.8 points, 14.4 rebounds, 5.2 assists, 2.2 steals and 1.2 blocks in five games during the West Coast Classic.

==== 2020–21 season ====
Continuing on as a development player in the 2020–21 NBL season, Travers was thrust into a much larger role early on, starting in both of the Wildcats' pre-season games against the Illawarra Hawks. While mostly a traditional wing player, he added strength to his frame over the off-season and was assigned the starting power forward role. He was replaced in the starting line-up by Jarred Bairstow midway through the season, with Travers later stating he got complacent in the role and was forced to work his way back into starting contention. On 28 March 2021, he went 6-of-6 from the field for 16 points off the bench in an 89–65 win over the Sydney Kings. A season-ending injury to Bryce Cotton saw Travers return to the starting line-up as a guard at the back-end of the regular season and in the semi-finals. On 27 May, he had 16 points and eight rebounds in an 81–67 win over the Kings. In the 2–1 semi-final series win over Illawarra, Travers averaged 10.7 points, 7.3 rebounds and three assists per game. He went on to miss the first two games of the grand final series against Melbourne United with a calf injury, returning in game three to record nine points and six rebounds off the bench in an 81–76 series-ending loss.

On 1 July 2021, Travers signed with the Mandurah Magic for the rest of the 2021 NBL1 West season. However, he was never cleared by the Wildcats medical staff to play for Mandurah.

==== 2021–22 season ====
Travers entered the 2021–22 NBL season as a fully contracted player and earned the rank of number 83 in ESPN's top 100 NBA draft rankings. On 5 December 2021, he had a career-high 14 rebounds in the Wildcats' 90–67 win over the Cairns Taipans. On 5 February 2022, he scored a career-high 24 points in a 101–79 win over the South East Melbourne Phoenix. He averaged 7.8 points, 5.4 rebounds, 2.3 assists, 0.8 steals and 0.7 blocks per game during the 2021–22 season, playing both inside and outside roles while also periodically running the offense.

==== 2022 NBA draft and Summer League ====
On 24 April 2022, Travers declared for the 2022 NBA draft. He was selected by the Cleveland Cavaliers with the 56th overall pick. He joined the Cavaliers for the 2022 NBA Summer League, where he averaged 6.6 points, 4.6 rebounds, 1.8 assists, 1.2 steals and 1.2 blocks in five games.

==== 2022–23 season ====
Travers re-joined the Wildcats for the 2022–23 NBL season. He helped the Wildcats return to the finals by recording 22 points, 11 rebounds and six assists in the regular-season finale against the Sydney Kings. In 29 games, he averaged 9.7 points, 5.7 rebounds, 2.9 assists and 1.1 steals per game.

Travers parted ways with the Wildcats on 30 March 2023.

=== Melbourne United (2023–2024) ===
On 17 April 2023, Travers signed a three-year deal with Melbourne United. Three months later, he helped the Cleveland Cavaliers win the 2023 NBA Summer League championship. He played in each of Cleveland's five games, averaging 7.8 points, 6.8 rebounds, 1.6 assists and 2.2 blocks per game.

While initially signed by United to fill a power forward role, Travers was trialled as a point guard during pre-season. In his debut for United on 28 September 2023, he scored a game-high 20 points in an 82–67 win over the South East Melbourne Phoenix. In game one of United's semi-finals series against the Illawarra Hawks, Travers had 24 points and eight rebounds in a 115–106 overtime win. In 36 games (34 starts) during the 2023–24 NBL season, he averaged 12.4 points on .517 shooting from the field, 7.6 rebounds, 2.1 assists, 1.33 blocks and 1.17 steals in 27.0 minutes.

On 7 August 2024, United granted Travers a release from his contract to pursue NBA opportunities.

=== Cleveland Cavaliers (2024–2026) ===
In July 2024, Travers re-joined the Cleveland Cavaliers for the 2024 NBA Summer League and on 28 August, he signed a two-way contract with the team, splitting the 2024–25 season with the Cavaliers' NBA G League affiliate, the Cleveland Charge. He appeared in all four preseason games for the Cavaliers. He made his NBA debut on 1 November against the Orlando Magic, playing the last four minutes of the game and finished with four points, two rebounds, two assists and one block in a 120–109 win. On 13 December, he recorded his first career triple-double with 25 points, 11 assists, and 10 rebounds with two blocks in 38 minutes in the Charge's 141–131 win over the Wisconsin Herd. Following this game, he was sidelined with an ankle injury until late January. On 13 February 2025, he posted his second triple-double of the season with 25 points, 18 rebounds, 10 assists and two blocks in a 130–116 win over Raptors 905. On 12 March, he recorded his third triple-double of the season with 16 points, 11 rebounds and 10 assists in a 120–113 win over the Rip City Remix. On 29 March, he recorded his fourth triple-double of the season with 11 points, 11 rebounds and 11 assists in a 128–93 win over the Long Island Nets.

On 2 July 2025, Travers re-signed with the Cavaliers on a two-way contract. He appeared in 12 games for the Cavaliers and 15 games (10 starts) for the Charge in 2025–26, before being waived by Cleveland on 1 February 2026 to make room for Dennis Schroder and Keon Ellis.

In July 2026, Travers joined the Milwaukee Bucks for the 2026 NBA Summer League.

=== Return to Melbourne United (2026–present) ===
On 23 July 2026, Travers signed a two-year deal with Melbourne United, returning to the team for a second stint. He earned the Ray Borner Award as the MVP of the pre-season Blitz tournament. On 23 October, he recorded 26 points, nine rebounds and five assists in a 103–102 loss to the Perth Wildcats.

== National team career ==
In 2018, Travers represented Australia at the Under-17 FIBA World Cup in Argentina and won gold at the Under-16 FIBA Asia Championship in China. He had 22 points, eight rebounds, three assists, four steals and two blocks for Australia in their title-clinching victory over China and was named in the all-tournament second team.

In August 2022, Travers made his Australian Boomers debut during the World Cup qualifiers.

In August 2026, Travers was named in the Boomers squad for a new window of the FIBA Basketball World Cup 2027 Asian Qualifiers.

== Career statistics ==
Legend
GP	Games played	GS	Games started	MPG	Minutes per game
FG%	Field goal percentage	3P%	3-point field goal percentage	FT%	Free throw percentage
RPG	Rebounds per game	APG	Assists per game	SPG	Steals per game
BPG	Blocks per game	PPG	Points per game	**Bold**	Career high

=== NBA ===
Year	Team	GP	GS	MPG	FG%	3P%	FT%	RPG	APG	SPG	BPG	PPG
2024–25	Cleveland	**12**	0	7.3	**.250**	.000	**1.000**	1.7	.7	.1	.1	1.0
2025–26	Cleveland	**12**	0	**8.6**	**.250**	**.063**	**1.000**	**2.0**	**.8**	**.6**	**.3**	**2.3**
Career		24	0	8.0	.250	.040	1.000	1.8	.7	.3	.2	1.7

== Personal life ==
Travers is the son of Karl and Sam Travers. He has a brother and a sister.
