= Taran Armstrong =

Australian basketball player (born 2002)

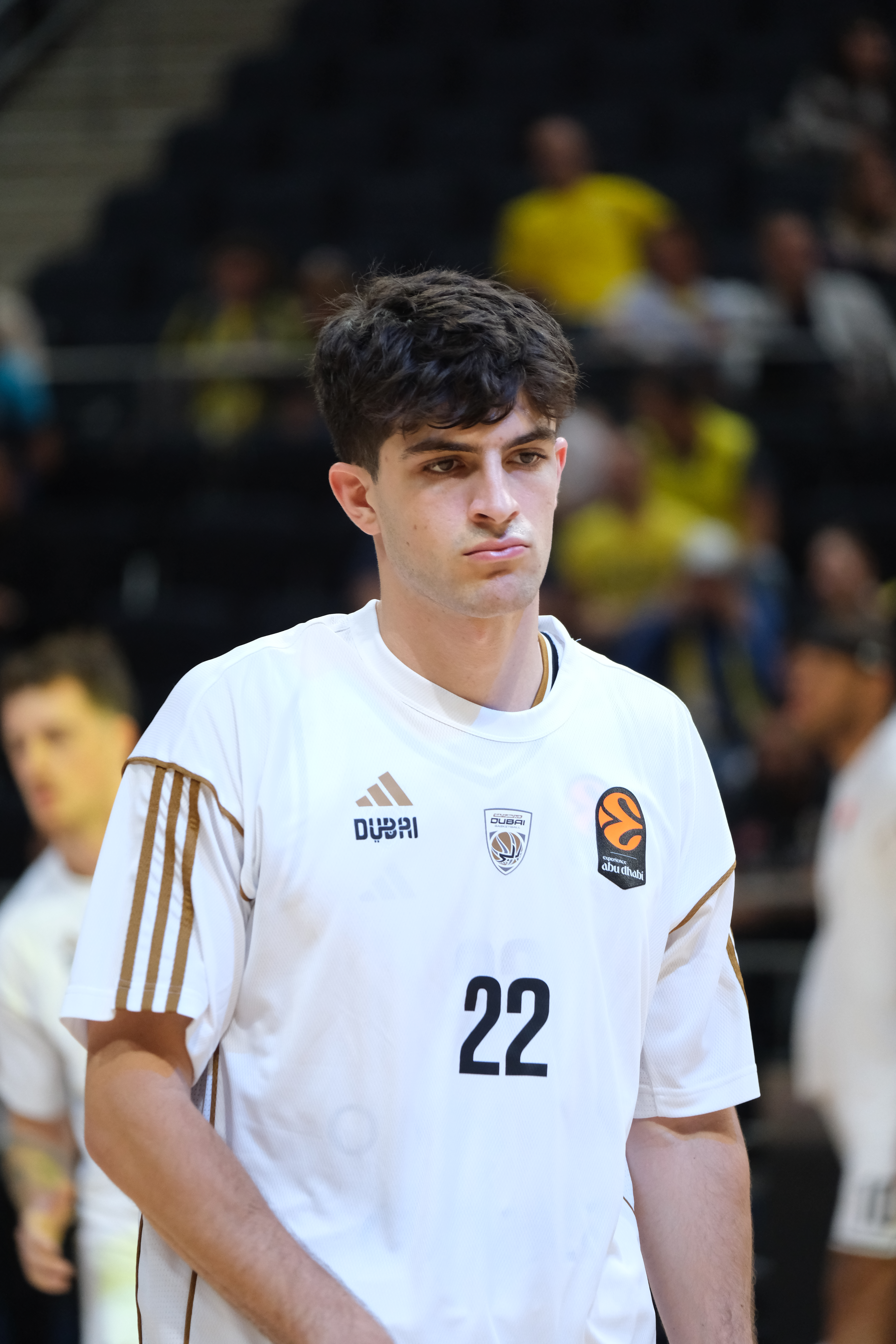
- Armstrong with Dubai Basketball in 2025

No. 1 – Tasmania JackJumpers
- Position: Point guard
- League: NBL

Personal information
- Born: 15 January 2002 (age 24) Burnie, Tasmania, Australia
- Listed height: 196 cm (6 ft 5 in)
- Listed weight: 88 kg (194 lb)

Career information
- High school: Marist Regional College (Burnie, Tasmania)
- College: California Baptist (2021–2023)
- NBA draft: 2024: undrafted
- Playing career: 2018–present

Career history
- 2018–2020: BA Centre of Excellence
- 2021: North-West Tasmania Thunder
- 2023–2025: Cairns Taipans
- 2025: Santa Cruz Warriors
- 2025–2026: Dubai Basketball
- 2026–present: Tasmania JackJumpers

Career highlights
- ABA League champion (2026); Second-team All-WAC (2023); WAC Freshman of the Year (2022)
- Stats at NBA.com
- Stats at Basketball Reference

Taran Jet Armstrong (born 15 January 2002) is an Australian professional basketball player for the Tasmania JackJumpers of the National Basketball League (NBL). He played two seasons of college basketball in the United States for the California Baptist Lancers before joining the Cairns Taipans of the NBL in 2023. After two seasons with the Taipans, he joined the Golden State Warriors in February 2025 and finished the 2024–25 season with the Santa Cruz Warriors of the NBA G League.

== Early life and career ==
Armstrong was born in Burnie, Tasmania. He began playing organised basketball around the age of five or six, inspired by watching his father and uncle compete together in the North West Basketball Union (NWBU). Armstrong attended Marist Regional College in Burnie and played for both Burnie and Wynyard in the NWBU.

Armstrong moved to Canberra in mid 2018 after being awarded an NBA Global Academy scholarship with Basketball Australia's Centre of Excellence. He spent three years with the BA Centre of Excellence, playing four games in the South East Australian Basketball League in 2018, five games in the NBL1 in the 2019 season, and two games in the Waratah League in 2020. He also helped Tasmania claim a bronze medal at the 2020 Under 20 National Championships after averaging 25 points per game.

In November 2020, Armstrong signed with the North-West Tasmania Thunder of the NBL1 South for the 2021 NBL1 season. In seven games, he averaged 16.1 points, 5.1 rebounds, 4.4 assists and 2.1 steals per game.

== College career ==
In November 2020, Armstrong signed with the California Baptist Lancers for the 2021–22 season. He joined his older brother Tre on the team.

As a freshman in 2021–22, Armstrong played in 26 games for the Lancers, making 25 starts and averaging 10.5 points, 5.2 rebounds and 6.3 assists in 32.2 minutes per game. His 6.3 assists per game led the nation's freshmen class and was fifth among all players, and he became the eighth freshman in the NCAA men's basketball history to average at least 10 points, five rebounds, and six assists in a single season. He recorded the program's first triple-double with 16 points, 12 assists and 10 rebounds against San Jose State on 18 November; had a career-high 11 rebounds against San Diego Christian on 27 November; broke the program record for single-game assists with 15 against North Dakota on 7 December; and scored a season-high 22 points against Utah Valley on 26 February. He was subsequently named the WAC Freshman of the Year, the first in program history. Armstrong and his brother helped the Lancers to an 18–16 record on the season.

As a sophomore in 2022–23, Armstrong played and started in all 33 games for the Lancers, averaging 11.3 points, 4.5 rebounds and 5.0 assists in 29.5 minutes per game. He led CBU in scoring and assists and led the WAC in assists per game for the second straight year. He recorded four 20-point games on the season, including a career-high 25 points against Southern Utah on 1 February 2023. He was subsequently named to the All-WAC Second Team.

In April 2023, Armstrong initially entered the NCAA transfer portal, but later decided to forgo the remainder of his NCAA eligibility to start his professional career in Australia.

== Professional career ==
=== Cairns Taipans (2023–2025) ===
On 17 May 2023, Armstrong signed a two-year contract with the Cairns Taipans of the National Basketball League (NBL). A foot injury delayed his start to the 2023–24 NBL season. He played in 23 games and averaged 7.7 points, 4 rebounds and 2.7 assists across 21 minutes per game.

During the 2024 off-season, Armstrong was an auto-entrant in the 2024 NBA draft, and was then a prime candidate for a two-way contract. He was named to the All-Camp Team of the 2024 Adidas Eurocamp, and worked out for almost a dozen NBA teams.

Armstrong returned to the Taipans for the 2024–25 NBL season but missed the first two rounds with a calf injury. He helped the Taipans to two wins in round three before being sidelined again with an ankle injury. He returned to action in round eight, with the team having gone 0–6 in that time. On 6 February 2025, he recorded 28 points, 10 rebounds and 10 assists in a 100–88 win over the Brisbane Bullets, marking his first career triple-double and the league's first triple-double since 2023.

=== Santa Cruz Warriors (2025) ===
On 25 February 2025, Armstrong signed a two-way contract with the Golden State Warriors, becoming the first Tasmanian to sign in the NBA. He made his debut for the Santa Cruz Warriors of the NBA G League on 7 March 2025, recording seven assists in a 112–110 loss to the Wisconsin Herd. He played in 12 games for Santa Cruz in the G League, but did not make his NBA debut for Golden State. He became a free agent following the 2024–25 season.

=== Dubai Basketball (2025–2026) ===
On 10 October 2025, Armstrong signed with Dubai Basketball of the ABA League and EuroLeague.

=== Tasmania JackJumpers (2026–present) ===
On 20 May 2026, Armstrong signed a two-year contract with the Tasmania JackJumpers. He was named the JackJumpers' vice captain alongside Josh Bannan for the 2026–27 NBL season. On 3 October 2026, he scored a game-high 29 points in a 109–99 overtime win over the Brisbane Bullets. On 18 October, he scored 32 points in a 98–92 win over the New Zealand Breakers.

== National team career ==
In 2019, Armstrong represented the Australia junior national team at the FIBA Under-17 Oceania Championship, where he helped his country win the gold medal with 11 points per game.

Armstrong played for the Australian Boomers at the 2021 FIBA Under-19 Basketball World Cup, 2022 FIBA Asia Cup qualifiers, and 2025 FIBA Asia Cup qualifiers.

In June 2026, Armstrong was named in the Boomers squad for the next window of the FIBA Basketball World Cup 2027 Asian Qualifiers in Perth in July.

== Personal life ==
Armstrong is the son of Benjamin and Melanie Armstrong. He has two siblings, Tre and Tanner. Tre signed with the Tasmania JackJumpers in 2023 but later requested to be released from his contract.
