= NBL TV =

- Country: Australia
- Broadcast area: Worldwide (except New Zealand)

Programming
- Language: English
- Picture format: 720p (HDTV)

Ownership
- Owner: NBL Media

History
- Launched: 30 August 2012
- Former names: NBL TV (2012–2015); NBL LIVE (2015–2016)

NBL TV is an Australian subscription-based internet television channel, operated by the National Basketball League, which is available worldwide through the League's official website. The channel holds rights to not only the NBL, but a number of other basketball leagues and competitions worldwide too. Replays are available for all games after their completion.

== Platforms ==
- NBL App (mobile and tablet)
- nbl.tv (website)

== Broadcast Rights ==
- National Basketball League (Australia)
- National Basketball League (New Zealand) 2017 Season
- Chinese Basketball Association 2017 Season (Finals only)
- Liga ACB 2017 Season (Select Real Madrid and FC Barcelona games only)
- NBL All-Australian Team V China series 2017
- NBL All-Australian Team Tour of China 2018
- Brisbane Bullets V China game 2017
- NBLxNBA 2017 (Replays only)
- EuroLeague (from 2019 to 2020 season)
- EuroCup (from 2019 to 2020 season)

== See also ==
- List of sports television channels
- National Basketball League
