= 2019–20 NBL regular season =

The regular season of the 2019–20 NBL season, the 42nd season of the National Basketball League (Australia) started on 3 October 2019 and finished on 16 February 2020. Nine teams participated, with the South East Melbourne Phoenix entering the league for their first season.

== Games ==
=== Round 1 ===
3 October 2019	Melbourne United	88–91	South East Melbourne Phoenix	Melbourne Arena, Melbourne, Victoria
19:30	Scoring by quarter: 22–21, 21–28, 17–20, 28–22
ESPN	Pts: Goulding 27; Rebs: Long 13; Asts: Trimble 6	boxscore broadcast report	Pts: Creek 28; Rebs: Creek 11; Asts: Creek, Trist, Roberson 3	Attendance: 10,300; Referees: Vaughan Mayberry, Jon Chapman, Mitch Hare

4 October 2019	Cairns Taipans	71–79	Sydney Kings	Cairns Convention Centre, Cairns, Queensland
19:30	Scoring by quarter: 20–13, 21–24, 22–20, 8–22
ESPN	Pts: Noi 14; Rebs: Noi 12; Asts: Machado 8	boxscore report	Pts: Ware 23; Rebs: Bogut 12; Asts: Ware, Bogut 5	Attendance: 4,370; Referees: Scott Beker, Toni Caldwell, Ruben Woolcock

5 October 2019	Perth Wildcats	94–93	Melbourne United	RAC Arena, Perth, Western Australia
15:30	Scoring by quarter: 27–28, 21–26, 22–20, 24–19
SBS Viceland	Pts: Cotton 21; Rebs: Kay 8 Asts: Kay 7	boxscore report	Pts: Trimble 25; Rebs: Trimble 8 Asts: Trimble 5	Attendance: 12,503; Referees: Michael Aylen, Nico Fernandes, Craig Copes

6 October 2019	Illawarra Hawks	81–90	Brisbane Bullets	WIN Entertainment Centre, Wollongong, New South Wales
15:00	Scoring by quarter: 26–27, 21–21, 14–22, 20–20
SBS Viceland	Pts: Brooks 23; Rebs: Ball 10; Asts: Ball 5	boxscore report	Pts: Patterson 25; Rebs: Gliddon 9 Asts: Braun 6	Attendance: 3,677; Referees: James Boyer, Chris Reid, Daniel Battye

=== Round 2 ===
11 October 2019	Brisbane Bullets	90–74	Cairns Taipans	Nissan Arena, Brisbane, Queensland
18:30	Scoring by quarter: 21–24, 24–25, 31–14, 14–11
ESPN	Pts: Sobey 21; Rebs: Patterson 6 Asts: Braun, Patterson, Sobey 5	boxscore broadcast report	Pts: Machado, Oliver 16; Rebs: Noi, Oliver 7 Asts: Machado 10	Attendance: 2,070; Referees: Vaughn Mayberry, Toni Caldwell, Marc Mills

11 October 2019	Perth Wildcats	103–76	Illawarra Hawks	RAC Arena, Perth, Western Australia
18:30	Scoring by quarter: 28–22, 27–20, 29–14, 19–20
ESPN	Pts: Cotton 28; Rebs: Hunt 10; Asts: Cotton 7	boxscore report	Pts: Ball 15; Rebs: Boone 12; Asts: Ball 8	Attendance: 13,550; Referees: Michael Aylen, Nico Fernandes, Mark Grist

12 October 2019	Sydney Kings	102–80	Adelaide 36ers	Qudos Bank Arena, Sydney, New South Wales
17:30	Scoring by quarter: 28–12, 29–28, 25–21, 18–17
SBS Viceland	Pts: Newley 18; Rebs: Tate 7 Asts: Bruce 7	boxscore report	Pts: Johnson 26; Rebs: Froling, Kyei 7 Asts: Randle 5	Attendance: 8,575; Referees: Chris Reid, James Boyer, Daniel Battye

13 October 2019	South East Melbourne Phoenix	113–93	Brisbane Bullets	Melbourne Arena, Melbourne, Victoria
15:00	Scoring by quarter: 23–25, 32–25, 31–24, 27–19
SBS Viceland	Pts: Roberson 30; Rebs: Madgen 8 Asts: Creek 7	boxscore report	Pts: Patterson 30; Rebs: Braun, Sobey 6 Asts: Sobey 7	Attendance: 6,019; Referees: Michael Aylen, Damian Lyons, Jon Chapman

14 October 2019	Illawarra Hawks	89–88	Cairns Taipans	WIN Entertainment Centre, Wollongong, New South Wales
19:30	Scoring by quarter: 18–23, 20–20, 28–17, 23–28
ESPN	Pts: Blanchfield 20; Rebs: Ogilvy 6 Asts: Brooks 6	boxscore report	Pts: Newbill 26; Rebs: Oliver 7 Asts: Machado 6	Attendance: 2,614; Referees: Vaughan Mayberry, James Boyer, Ruben Woolcock

=== Round 3 ===
18 October 2019	Sydney Kings	96–91	New Zealand Breakers	Qudos Bank Arena, Sydney, New South Wales
19:30	Scoring by quarter: 27–28, 21–19, 24–20, 24–24
ESPN	Pts: Ware 27; Rebs: Bogut 15; Asts: Bogut, Ware 5	boxscore report	Pts: Hopson 27; Rebs: Abercrombie 11; Asts: Hopson, Webster 3	Attendance: 6,469; Referees: Vaughan Mayberry, Scott Beker, Daniel Battye

18 October 2019	Perth Wildcats	76–99	Cairns Taipans	RAC Arena, Perth, Western Australia
18:30	Scoring by quarter: 22–24, 22–22, 16–28, 16–25
ESPN	Pts: Kay, White 15; Rebs: Hunt 8 Asts: Martin 6	boxscore broadcast report	Pts: Deng, Oliver 22; Rebs: Jawai, Oliver 9 Asts: Machado 7	Attendance: 12,331; Referees: Chris Reid, Nico Fernandes, Nathan Durant

19 October 2019	Adelaide 36ers	104–98	Brisbane Bullets	Adelaide Entertainment Centre, Adelaide, South Australia
17:00	Scoring by quarter: 26–28, 30–18, 23–26, 25–26
SBS Viceland	Pts: Griffin 22; Rebs: Johnson 7 Asts: Randle 5	boxscore report	Pts: Patterson 21; Rebs: Braun, Hodgson 5 Asts: Patterson 6	Attendance: 7,515; Referees: Michael Aylen, James Griguol, Damian Lyons

19 October 2019	South East Melbourne Phoenix	106–102	Illawarra Hawks	Melbourne Arena, Melbourne, Victoria
20:00	Scoring by quarter: 26–23, 27–23, 26–31, 27–25
ESPN	Pts: Roberson 26; Rebs: Pineau 10; Asts: Roberson 10	boxscore report	Pts: Brooks 23; Rebs: Ball 7 Asts: Brooks, Ogilvy 5	Attendance: 10,098; Referees: Scott Beker, Toni Caldwell, Mitch Hare

20 October 2019	New Zealand Breakers	66–76	Sydney Kings	Spark Arena, Auckland, New Zealand
17:00	Scoring by quarter: 21–25, 24–15, 13–17, 8–19
Sky Sport	Pts: Webster 14; Rebs: Ashley, Loe 8 Asts: Hopson 4	boxscore report	Pts: Ware 17; Rebs: Bogut 16; Asts: Bruce 3	Attendance: 7,494; Referees: Jon Chapman, Vaughan Mayberry, Ryan Jones

20 October 2019	Melbourne United	93–95	Perth Wildcats	Melbourne Arena, Melbourne, Victoria
17:00	Scoring by quarter: 22–19, 22–23, 21–27, 28–27
SBS Viceland	Pts: Trimble 21; Rebs: Long 12; Asts: Trimble 5	boxscore report	Pts: Cotton 28; Rebs: Kay 8 Asts: Hunt 7	Attendance: 6,519; Referees: Michael Aylen, Damian Lyons, Nico Fernandes

21 October 2019	Illawarra Hawks	92–98	Adelaide 36ers	WIN Entertainment Centre, Wollongong, New South Wales
19:30	Scoring by quarter: 26–31, 23–25, 25–23, 18–19
ESPN	Pts: Brooks 31; Rebs: Ball, Brooks, Froling, Ogilvy 5 Asts: Ball 7	boxscore report	Pts: Johnson 21; Rebs: Johnson 10; Asts: Drmic, Moore 4	Attendance: 2,603; Referees: Chris Reid, James Boyer, Mitch Hare

=== Round 4 ===
24 October 2019	New Zealand Breakers	103–72	Illawarra Hawks	Spark Arena, Auckland, New Zealand
19:30	Scoring by quarter: 30–18, 24–19, 28–18, 21–17
Sky Sport	Pts: Henry 21; Rebs: Hopson 9 Asts: Webster 6	boxscore report	Pts: Brooks 19; Rebs: Ball 7 Asts: Ball 4	Attendance: 8,338; Referees: Michael Aylen, Jon Chapman, Ryan Jones

25 October 2019	Adelaide 36ers	101–97	Cairns Taipans	Adelaide Entertainment Centre, Adelaide, South Australia
19:00	Scoring by quarter: 22–30, 33–19, 29–20, 17–28
ESPN	Pts: Randle 22; Rebs: Kyei 9 Asts: Drmic 3	boxscore broadcast report	Pts: Oliver 21; Rebs: Oliver 8 Asts: Machado 9	Attendance: 6,288; Referees: Chris Reid, Nathan Durant, Nico Fernandes

25 October 2019	Perth Wildcats	110–79	South East Melbourne Phoenix	RAC Arena, Perth, Western Australia
18:30	Scoring by quarter: 26–13, 32–22, 25–24, 27–20
ESPN	Pts: White 17; Rebs: Kay 13; Asts: Cotton 8	boxscore report	Pts: Crockett 12; Rebs: Pineau 8 Asts: Madgen 5	Attendance: 12,763; Referees: James Boyer, Scott Beker, Mark Grist

26 October 2019	Melbourne United	104–98	New Zealand Breakers	Melbourne Arena, Melbourne, Victoria
17:30	Scoring by quarter: 22–30, 29–28, 27–23, 26–17
SBS Viceland	Pts: Long 27; Rebs: Long 11; Asts: McCarron 7	boxscore report	Pts: Ashley 24; Rebs: Abercrombie 8 Asts: Webster 6	Attendance: 6,746; Referees: Chris Reid, James Boyer, Craig Copes

26 October 2019	Sydney Kings	94–79	Brisbane Bullets	Qudos Bank Arena, Sydney, New South Wales
20:00	Scoring by quarter: 25–19, 27–13, 19–20, 23–27
ESPN	Pts: Ware 17; Rebs: Bogut 11; Asts: Ware 5	boxscore report	Pts: Sobey 21; Rebs: Braun 5 Asts: Braun, Hodgson, Patterson 3	Attendance: 7,819; Referees: Damian Lyons, Scott Beker, Mitch Hare

27 October 2019	South East Melbourne Phoenix	101–91	Adelaide 36ers	Melbourne Arena, Melbourne, Victoria
15:00	Scoring by quarter: 23–26, 24–24, 23–15, 31–26
SBS Viceland	Pts: Roberson 24; Rebs: Pineau 8 Asts: Roberson 7	boxscore report	Pts: Johnson 20; Rebs: Johnson 13; Asts: Randle 4	Attendance: 3,961; Referees: Michael Aylen, Jon Chapman, Daniel Battye

27 October 2019	Illawarra Hawks	76–81	Perth Wildcats	WIN Entertainment Centre, Wollongong, New South Wales
17:00	Scoring by quarter: 30–24, 14–19, 14–19, 18–19
SBS Viceland	Pts: Coenraad 18; Rebs: Ball 10; Asts: Ball 7	boxscore report	Pts: Cotton 21; Rebs: Martin 10; Asts: Cotton, Martin 4	Attendance: 3,223; Referees: Vaughan Mayberry, Toni Caldwell, James Grigoul

28 October 2019	Cairns Taipans	90–85	Melbourne United	Cairns Convention Centre, Cairns, Queensland
18:30	Scoring by quarter: 19–31, 22–14, 26–21, 23–19
ESPN	Pts: Jawai 18; Rebs: Oliver 11; Asts: Machado 8	boxscore report	Pts: Long, Trimble 21; Rebs: Long 17; Asts: Goulding 5	Attendance: 3,920; Referees: Vaughan Mayberry, Damian Lyons, Mitch Hare

=== Round 5 ===
31 October 2019	New Zealand Breakers	93–85	Cairns Taipans	Spark Arena, Auckland, New Zealand
19:30	Scoring by quarter: 22–11, 23–23, 17–23, 31–28
Sky Sport	Pts: Webster 23; Rebs: Ashley 11; Asts: Webster 8	boxscore report	Pts: Oliver 23; Rebs: Deng, Newbill 7 Asts: Machado 9	Attendance: 7,943; Referees: Chris Reid, Ryan Jones, Mitch Hare

1 November 2019	Brisbane Bullets	87–78	Perth Wildcats	Nissan Arena, Brisbane, Queensland
18:30	Scoring by quarter: 17–16, 24–22, 24–22, 22–18
ESPN	Pts: Cadee 17; Rebs: Patterson, Sobey 7 Asts: Cadee 5	boxscore broadcast report	Pts: White 23; Rebs: Kay 9 Asts: Martin 4	Attendance: 2,857; Referees: Vaughan Mayberry, Toni Caldwell, Marc Mills

2 November 2019	South East Melbourne Phoenix	98–110	Melbourne United	Melbourne Arena, Melbourne, Victoria
17:30	Scoring by quarter: 26–32, 16–23, 27–25, 29–30
SBS Viceland	Pts: Creek 23; Rebs: Creek, Crockett 7 Asts: Creek 7	boxscore report	Pts: Long 31; Rebs: Long 11; Asts: McCarron 4	Attendance: 6,745; Referees: Jon Chapman, James Boyer, Toni Caldwell

2 November 2019	Adelaide 36ers	96–98(OT)	Sydney Kings	Adelaide Entertainment Centre, Adelaide, South Australia
19:30	Scoring by quarter: 24–12, 19–33, 17–24, 26–17, Overtime: 10–12
ESPN	Pts: Randle 23; Rebs: Drmic 15; Asts: Randle 4	boxscore report	Pts: Bogut 18; Rebs: Bogut 12; Asts: Tate 5	Attendance: 8,252; Referees: Michael Aylen, James Griguol, Craig Copes

3 November 2019	New Zealand Breakers	79–84	Perth Wildcats	ILT Stadium Southland, Invercargill, New Zealand
15:00	Scoring by quarter: 19–15, 22–20, 21–31, 17–18
Sky Sport	Pts: Ashley, Webster 21; Rebs: Hampton 7 Asts: Webster 6	boxscore report	Pts: Hunt 21; Rebs: Hunt 11; Asts: Cotton 7	Attendance: 2,054; Referees: Chris Reid, Nathan Durrant, Daniel Battye

3 November 2019	Illawarra Hawks	69–83	Brisbane Bullets	AIS Arena, Canberra, Australian Capital Territory
15:00	Scoring by quarter: 15–27, 17–26, 20–16, 17–14
SBS Viceland	Pts: Ball 19; Rebs: Ball 9 Asts: Ball 5	boxscore report	Pts: Sobey 18; Rebs: Hodgson 9 Asts: Patterson 7	Attendance: 3,808; Referees: Michael Aylin, Damian Lyons, Ruben Woolcock

4 November 2019	Melbourne United	107–104	Sydney Kings	Melbourne Arena, Melbourne, Victoria
19:30	Scoring by quarter: 25–29, 23–26, 28–21, 31–28
ESPN	Pts: Trimble 27; Rebs: Long 14; Asts: Trimble 5	boxscore report	Pts: Ware 34; Rebs: Bogut 8 Asts: Bruce 8	Attendance: 10,300; Referees: Vaughan Mayberry, Jon Chapman, Craig Copes

=== Round 6 ===
7 November 2019	New Zealand Breakers	101–104	Melbourne United	Spark Arena, Auckland, New Zealand
19:30	Scoring by quarter: 27–27, 26–24, 14–33, 34–20
Sky Sport	Pts: Rice 26; Rebs: Ashley, Webster 8 Asts: Webster 4	boxscore report	Pts: Goulding 24; Rebs: Long 8 Asts: Trimble 5	Attendance: 8,371; Referees: Vaughan Mayberry, Damian Lyons, Ryan Jones

8 November 2019	Brisbane Bullets	85–95	Sydney Kings	Nissan Arena, Brisbane, Queensland
18:30	Scoring by quarter: 33–25, 27–22, 8–28, 17–20
ESPN	Pts: Patterson 22; Rebs: Patterson 11; Asts: Patterson 7	boxscore broadcast report	Pts: Newley 20; Rebs: Bogut 8 Asts: Bruce 8	Attendance: 3,757; Referees: Chris Reed, Toni Caldwell, James Boyer

9 November 2019	South East Melbourne Phoenix	103–78	New Zealand Breakers	Melbourne Arena, Melbourne, Victoria
17:30	Scoring by quarter: 18–17, 24–31, 29–14, 32–16
SBS Viceland	Pts: Creek 21; Rebs: Creek 11; Asts: Roberson 9	boxscore report	Pts: Webster 22; Rebs: Ashley 12; Asts: Henry 8	Attendance: 3,772; Referees: Michael Aylen, Jon Chapman, James Griguol

9 November 2019	Cairns Taipans	91–101	Illawarra Hawks	Cairns Convention Centre, Cairns, Queensland
19:00	Scoring by quarter: 21–22, 24–37, 23–19, 23–23
ESPN	Pts: Djeric 19; Rebs: Oliver 7 Asts: Jawai 5	boxscore report	Pts: Ball 24; Rebs: Boone, Ogilvy 9 Asts: Ball 9	Attendance: 5,092; Referees: Chris Reid, Nathan Durant, Marc Mill

10 November 2019	Melbourne United	109–90	Adelaide 36ers	Melbourne Arena, Melbourne, Victoria
15:00	Scoring by quarter: 19–27, 37–14, 24–25, 29–24
SBS Viceland	Pts: Trimble 32; Rebs: Barlow 5 Asts: McCarron 5	boxscore report	Pts: Randle 17; Rebs: Johnson 4 Asts: Moore, Randle, White 3	Attendance: 7,254; Referees: Michael Aylen, Damian Lyons, Craig Copes

10 November 2019	Sydney Kings	104–85	Perth Wildcats	Qudos Bank Arena, Sydney, New South Wales
17:00	Scoring by quarter: 20–20, 29–26, 30–18, 25–21
SBS Viceland	Pts: Louzada 28; Rebs: Tate 8 Asts: Bruce 7	boxscore report	Pts: Cotton 36; Rebs: Hunt 10; Asts: Cotton, Hunt 3	Attendance: 9,665; Referees: Vaughan Mayberry, James Boyer, Nico Fernandes

=== Round 7 ===
15 November 2019	Adelaide 36ers	95–99	Perth Wildcats	Adelaide Entertainment Centre, Adelaide, South Australia
19:00	Scoring by quarter: 25–22, 21–23, 25–31, 24–23
ESPN	Pts: Johnson, Randle 23; Rebs: Johnson 13; Asts: Randle 6	boxscore broadcast report	Pts: Kay 21; Rebs: Hunt, Kay 8 Asts: Kay 5	Attendance: 6,536; Referees: Chris Reid, Jon Chapman, Nathan Durant

16 November 2019	Melbourne United	96–95	South East Melbourne Phoenix	Melbourne Arena, Melbourne, Victoria
17:30	Scoring by quarter: 26–31, 21–22, 21–19, 28–23
SBS Viceland	Pts: Trimble 22; Rebs: Long, McCarron 8 Asts: Ili 4	boxscore report	Pts: Creek 27; Rebs: Benson 8 Asts: Roberson 6	Attendance: 10,300; Referees: James Boyer, Jon Chapman, Nico Fernandes

16 November 2019	Cairns Taipans	94–85	Brisbane Bullets	Cairns Convention Centre, Cairns, Queensland
19:00	Scoring by quarter: 24–20, 25–19, 27–18, 18–28
ESPN	Pts: Noi 20; Rebs: Noi 10; Asts: Machado 9	boxscore report	Pts: Sobey 20; Rebs: Hodgson 9 Asts: Sobey 7	Attendance: 4,017; Referees: Damian Lyons, Toni Caldwell, Marc Mill

17 November 2019	Sydney Kings	92–87	Illawarra Hawks	Qudos Bank Arena, Sydney, New South Wales
15:00	Scoring by quarter: 24–28, 27–17, 19–20, 22–22
SBS Viceland	Pts: Tate 24; Rebs: Bogut 9 Asts: Ware 6	boxscore report	Pts: Blanchfield 22; Rebs: Ogilvy 13; Asts: Ball 6	Attendance: 17,514; Referees: James Boyer, Damien Lyons, James Grigoul

17 November 2019	Perth Wildcats	88–77	New Zealand Breakers	RAC Arena, Perth, Western Australia
14:00	Scoring by quarter: 20–19, 27–16, 20–27, 21–15
SBS Viceland	Pts: Cotton 34; Rebs: Kay 8 Asts: Martin, White 5	boxscore report	Pts: Webster 23; Rebs: Ashley, Webster 7 Asts: Hampton 5	Attendance: 12,945; Referees: Chris Reid, Nico Fernandes, Nathan Durant

18 November 2019	South East Melbourne Phoenix	91–103	Adelaide 36ers	Melbourne Arena, Melbourne, Victoria
19:30	Scoring by quarter: 24–26, 14–24, 28–11, 25–32
ESPN	Pts: Creek 22; Rebs: Creek 11; Asts: Roberson 6	boxscore report	Pts: Randle 27; Rebs: Drmic 8 Asts: Griffin 5	Attendance: 2,893; Referees: Michael Aylen, Vaughan Mayberry, Mitch Hare

=== Round 8 ===
22 November 2019	Brisbane Bullets	106–104	Adelaide 36ers	Nissan Arena, Brisbane, Queensland
18:30	Scoring by quarter: 27–27, 29–28, 22–20, 28–29
ESPN	Pts: Patterson 27; Rebs: Patterson 6 Asts: Singler 6	boxscore broadcast report	Pts: Drmic, Randle 25; Rebs: Griffin 8 Asts: Drmic 6	Attendance: 3,012; Referees: Vaughan Mayberry, Nico Fernandes, Daniel Battye

23 November 2019	South East Melbourne Phoenix	86–90	Sydney Kings	Melbourne Arena, Melbourne, Victoria
17:30	Scoring by quarter: 19–25, 18–30, 28–12, 21–23
SBS Viceland	Pts: Roberson 25; Rebs: Pineau 12; Asts: Roberson 6	boxscore report	Pts: Ware 25; Rebs: Bogut 10; Asts: Bogut, Bruce, Ware 4	Attendance: 4,656; Referees: Chris Reid, Damian Lyons, Tony Caldwell

23 November 2019	Cairns Taipans	91–84	Perth Wildcats	Cairns Convention Centre, Cairns, Queensland
19:00	Scoring by quarter: 21–21, 19–29, 20–20, 31–14
ESPN	Pts: Noi 19; Rebs: Jawai, Noi 6 Asts: Machado 9	boxscore report	Pts: Steindl 17; Rebs: Martin 5 Asts: Kay, Martin 4	Attendance: 4,035; Referees: Vaughan Mayberry, James Boyer, Marc Mill

24 November 2019	Melbourne United	108–94	Brisbane Bullets	Melbourne Arena, Melbourne, Victoria
15:00	Scoring by quarter: 27–27, 22–21, 32–24, 27–22
SBS Viceland	Pts: Trimble 25; Rebs: Lual-Acuil 13; Asts: McCarron 7	boxscore report	Pts: Cadee 18; Rebs: Hodgson, Patterson 7 Asts: Patterson 8	Attendance: 7,235; Referees: Chris Reid, Jon Chapman, Mark Grist

24 November 2019	Adelaide 36ers	117–100	New Zealand Breakers	Adelaide Entertainment Centre, Adelaide, South Australia
16:30	Scoring by quarter: 29–28, 31–15, 30–26, 27–31
SBS Viceland	Pts: Griffin 24; Rebs: Johnson 11; Asts: Moore 4	boxscore report	Pts: Henry 18; Rebs: Ashley 8 Asts: Hampton 6	Attendance: 7,514; Referees: Michael Aylen, Craig Copes, Nathan Durant

25 November 2019	Illawarra Hawks	114–106(OT)	Cairns Taipans	WIN Entertainment Centre, Wollongong, New South Wales
19:30	Scoring by quarter: 29–23, 30–24, 20–24, 20–28, Overtime: 15–7
ESPN	Pts: Ball 32; Rebs: Ball 11; Asts: Ball 13	boxscore report	Pts: Newbill 27; Rebs: Oliver 10; Asts: Machado 13	Attendance: 3,275; Referees: Michael Aylen, Damien Lyons, Ruben Woolcock

=== Round 9 ===
29 November 2019	Cairns Taipans	93–86	Melbourne United	Cairns Convention Centre, Cairns, Queensland
18:30	Scoring by quarter: 20–26, 27–18, 22–13, 24–29
ESPN	Pts: Oliver 26; Rebs: Oliver 13; Asts: Machado 10	boxscore broadcast report	Pts: Goulding 19; Rebs: Long 14; Asts: Goulding, Trimble 4	Attendance: 3,904; Referees: Vaughan Mayberry, Toni Caldwell, Nathan Durant

30 November 2019	New Zealand Breakers	91–79	Illawarra Hawks	Spark Arena, Auckland, New Zealand
19:30	Scoring by quarter: 28–19, 22–19, 19–21, 22–20
Sky Sport	Pts: Henry 25; Rebs: Ashley 14; Asts: Henry 3	boxscore report	Pts: Ball 25; Rebs: Ball 12; Asts: Ball 10	Attendance: 8,474; Referees: Chris Reid, Jon Chapman, Ryan Jones

30 November 2019	Brisbane Bullets	95–110	South East Melbourne Phoenix	Nissan Arena, Brisbane, Queensland
19:00	Scoring by quarter: 31–35, 30–18, 18–31, 16–26
ESPN	Pts: Cadee 15; Rebs: Magnay 7 Asts: Patterson 8	boxscore report	Pts: Madgen 23; Rebs: Pineau 9 Asts: Roberson 6	Attendance: 3,602; Referees: Michael Aylen, Toni Caldwell, Nathan Durant

1 December 2019	Sydney Kings	111–101	Melbourne United	Qudos Bank Arena, Sydney, New South Wales
15:00	Scoring by quarter: 35–25, 30–25, 31–28, 15–23
SBS Viceland	Pts: Ware 27; Rebs: Bogut 8 Asts: Ware 5	boxscore report	Pts: Trimble 32; Rebs: McCarron 6 Asts: Trimble 4	Attendance: 9,512; Referees: Michael Aylen, Nico Fernandez, Damian Lyons

1 December 2019	Perth Wildcats	88–99	Adelaide 36ers	RAC Arena, Perth, Western Australia
14:00	Scoring by quarter: 25–29, 17–29, 13–23, 33–18
SBS Viceland	Pts: Cotton 18; Rebs: Wagstaff 6 Asts: Kay, Travers, Wagstaff 4	boxscore report	Pts: Johnson 29; Rebs: Johnson 17; Asts: Randle 8	Attendance: 12,471; Referees: Vaughan Mayberry, James Boyer, James Griguoul

=== Round 10 ===
6 December 2019	Cairns Taipans	108–90	New Zealand Breakers	Cairns Convention Centre, Cairns, Queensland
18:30	Scoring by quarter: 3122, 30–22, 20–27, 27–19
ESPN	Pts: Machado 22; Rebs: Oliver 10; Asts: Machado 7	boxscore report	Pts: Rice Jr. 30; Rebs: Rice Jr. 12; Asts: Rice Jr. 8	Attendance: 3,992; Referees: Vaughan Mayberry, Damian Lyons, James Griguol

6 December 2019	Perth Wildcats	96–77	Sydney Kings	RAC Arena, Perth, Western Australia
18:30	Scoring by quarter: 30–27, 40–18, 11–12, 15–20
ESPN	Pts: Cotton 27; Rebs: Kay 13; Asts: Cotton 4	boxscore broadcast report	Pts: Ware 13; Rebs: Bogut 8 Asts: Bruce 4	Attendance: 12,270; Referees: Jon Chapman, Chris Reid, Nico Fernandez

7 December 2019	Melbourne United	112–90	Adelaide 36ers	Melbourne Arena, Melbourne, Victoria
17:30	Scoring by quarter: 33–17, 25–27, 25–27, 29–19
SBS Viceland	Pts: Long 34; Rebs: Long 15; Asts: Goulding, McCarron 4	boxscore report	Pts: Griffin 34; Rebs: Griffin 9 Asts: Froling, Griffin, Johnson, Randle 2	Attendance: 6,370; Referees: Michael Aylen, James Boyer, Mark Grist

7 December 2019	Brisbane Bullets	101–91	Illawarra Hawks	Nissan Arena, Brisbane, Queensland
19:00	Scoring by quarter: 24–24, 25–13, 30–28, 22–26
ESPN	Pts: Patterson 19; Rebs: Hodgson 9 Asts: Patterson 6	boxscore report	Pts: Blanchfield, Glover 17; Rebs: Ogilvy 11; Asts: Dech, Naar 5	Attendance: 5,276; Referees: Vaughan Mayberry, Jon Chapman, Alex McEwan

8 December 2019	South East Melbourne Phoenix	98–108	Perth Wildcats	Melbourne Arena, Melbourne, Victoria
15:00	Scoring by quarter: 28–30, 23–16, 23–31, 24–31
SBS Viceland	Pts: Creek 31; Rebs: Madgen 11; Asts: Gibson, Roberson, Wesley 4	boxscore report	Pts: Cotton 26; Rebs: Kay 12; Asts: Martin, Wagstaff 4	Attendance: 3,930; Referees: Michael Aylen, James Boyer, Mark Grist

8 December 2019	Sydney Kings	98–109	Cairns Taipans	Qudos Bank Arena, Sydney, New South Wales
17:00	Scoring by quarter: 19–30, 24–19, 2025, 35–35
SBS Viceland	Pts: Ware 23; Rebs: Bogut 12; Asts: Ware 7	boxscore report	Pts: Newbill 31; Rebs: Machado 7 Asts: Machado 9	Attendance: 8,638; Referees: Nico Fernandes, Chris Reid, James Griguol

9 December 2019	New Zealand Breakers	96–85	Brisbane Bullets	Spark Arena, Auckland, New Zealand
19:30	Scoring by quarter: 17–17, 30–30, 26–21, 23–17
Sky Sport	Pts: Webster 23; Rebs: Delany 8 Asts: Delany, Webster 3	boxscore report	Pts: Patterson 36; Rebs: Hodgson 9 Asts: Patterson 6	Attendance: 5,332; Referees: Vaughan Mayberry, Damian Lyons, Mitch Hare

=== Round 11 ===
12 December 2019	Cairns Taipans	84–88	Perth Wildcats	Cairns Convention Centre, Cairns, Queensland
18:30	Scoring by quarter: 21–24, 30–23, 18–16, 15–25
ESPN	Pts: Oliver 21; Rebs: Oliver 17; Asts: Machado 12	boxscore broadcast report	Pts: Cotton 24; Rebs: Kay 11; Asts: Kay 5	Attendance: 4,358; Referees: Vaughan Mayberry, Toni Caldwell, Alex McEwan

13 December 2019	Adelaide 36ers	113–111	South East Melbourne Phoenix	Adelaide Entertainment Centre, Adelaide, South Australia
19:00	Scoring by quarter: 31–22, 20–26, 35–28, 27–35
ESPN	Pts: Randle 26; Rebs: Griffin 10; Asts: Randle 8	boxscore report	Pts: Creek 27; Rebs: Creek 11; Asts: Creek, Roberson 4	Attendance: not available Referees: Chris Reid, Nico Fernandes, Nathan Durant

14 December 2019	Melbourne United	81–104	Sydney Kings	Melbourne Arena, Melbourne, Victoria
17:30	Scoring by quarter: 18–31, 18–21, 23–23, 22–29
SBS Viceland	Pts: Trimble 19; Rebs: Lual-Acuil 6 Asts: Trimble 5	boxscore report	Pts: Ware 27; Rebs: Tate 12; Asts: Bruce 4	Attendance: 8,755; Referees: Michael Aylen, Damian Lyons, Nico Fernandes

14 December 2019	Perth Wildcats	86–78	Brisbane Bullets	RAC Arena, Perth, Western Australia
17:00	Scoring by quarter: 20–18, 20–20, 22–18, 24–22
ESPN	Pts: Cotton 23; Rebs: Martin 8 Asts: Norton 3	boxscore report	Pts: Sobey 15; Rebs: Hodgson, Patterson 8 Asts: Cadee 4	Attendance: 12,522; Referees: Chris Reid, James Boyer, James Grigoul

15 December 2019	New Zealand Breakers	96–99	Adelaide 36ers	Spark Arena, Auckland, New Zealand
17:00	Scoring by quarter: 23–35, 27–25, 24–17, 22–22
Sky Sport	Pts: Abercrombie 22; Rebs: Abercrombie 9 Asts: Hopson 6	boxscore report	Pts: Randle 29; Rebs: Griffin 8 Asts: Randle 4	Attendance: 5,328; Referees: Vaughan Mayberry, Jon Chapman, Mitch Hare

15 December 2019	South East Melbourne Phoenix	112–105(OT)	Cairns Taipans	Melbourne Arena, Melbourne, Victoria
17:00	Scoring by quarter: 30–28, 21–18, 20–30, 24–19, Overtime: 17–10
SBS Viceland	Pts: Roberson 32; Rebs: Creek, Pineau 9 Asts: Wesley 6	boxscore report	Pts: Newbill 30; Rebs: Oliver 13; Asts: Machado 6	Attendance: 3,856; Referees: Michael Aylen, Damian Lyons, Travis Stewart

16 December 2019	Illawarra Hawks	73–94	Melbourne United	WIN Entertainment Centre, Wollongong, New South Wales
19:30	Scoring by quarter: 24–25, 16–14, 16–26, 17–29
ESPN	Pts: Glover 15; Rebs: Boone, Hobson, Ogilvy 7 Asts: Hobson, Naar 5	boxscore report	Pts: Trimble 22; Rebs: Long 14; Asts: Trimble 6	Attendance: 3,073; Referees: James Boyer, Chris Reid, Marc Mill

=== Round 12 ===
20 December 2019	New Zealand Breakers	90–84	South East Melbourne Phoenix	Horncastle Arena, Christchurch, New Zealand
19:30	Scoring by quarter: 24–22, 26–22, 26–19, 14–21
Sky Sport	Pts: Hopson 24; Rebs: Hopson 9 Asts: Henry 4	boxscore report	Pts: Creek 24; Rebs: Pineau 9 Asts: Roberson 7	Attendance: 3,333; Referees: Michael Aylen, Mitch Hare, James Grigoul

20 December 2019	Adelaide 36ers	84–93	Illawarra Hawks	Adelaide Entertainment Centre, Adelaide, South Australia
19:30	Scoring by quarter: 23–22, 19–30, 17–17, 25–24
ESPN	Pts: Randle 26; Rebs: Griffin 10; Asts: Randle 6	boxscore report	Pts: Dech 18; Rebs: Ogilvy 9 Asts: Naar 7	Attendance: 8,824; Referees: Chris Reid, Damian Lyons, Daniel Troy

21 December 2019	Brisbane Bullets	87–80	Sydney Kings	Nissan Arena, Brisbane, Queensland
16:30	Scoring by quarter: 21–29, 27–16, 21–13, 18–22
SBS Viceland	Pts: Magnay 23; Rebs: Magnay 14; Asts: Singler 6	boxscore report	Pts: Ware 26; Rebs: Cooks 7 Asts: Ware 3	Attendance: 4,016; Referees: Vaughan Mayberry, Jon Chapman, Nathan Durant

21 December 2019	Perth Wildcats	74–87	Melbourne United	RAC Arena, Perth, Western Australia
17:00	Scoring by quarter: 20–22, 19–25, 14–22, 21–18
ESPN	Pts: Cotton 15; Rebs: Kay 5 Asts: Cotton, Martin, White 3	boxscore broadcast report	Pts: Long, Trimble 23; Rebs: Long 13; Asts: Trimble 6	Attendance: 13,130; Referees: Chris Reid, James Boyer, Mark Grist

22 December 2019	Illawarra Hawks	89–91	New Zealand Breakers	WIN Entertainment Centre, Wollongong, New South Wales
15:00	Scoring by quarter: 17–23, 26–29, 25–19, 21–20
SBS	Pts: Blanchfield 19; Rebs: Ogilvy 7 Asts: Naar 8	boxscore report	Pts: Hopson 19; Rebs: Hopson 7 Asts: Henry 6	Attendance: 3,561; Referees: Damian Lyons, Nathan Durant, Daniel Battye

22 December 2019	Cairns Taipans	94–86	Adelaide 36ers	Cairns Convention Centre, Cairns, Queensland
16:00	Scoring by quarter: 31–17, 26–27, 17–21, 20–21
SBS Viceland	Pts: Newbill 26; Rebs: Oliver 15; Asts: Machado 13	boxscore report	Pts: Randle 19; Rebs: Griffin 11; Asts: Randle 7	Attendance: Michael Aylen, Toni Caldwell, Marc Mill; Referees: 4,265

23 December 2019	Sydney Kings	110–98	South East Melbourne Phoenix	Qudos Bank Arena, Sydney, New South Wales
19:30	Scoring by quarter: 29–27, 30–29, 29–24, 22–27
ESPN	Pts: Kickert 18; Rebs: Cooks 9 Asts: Ware 7	boxscore report	Pts: Roberson 25; Rebs: Creek 12; Asts: Adnam, Roberson 5	Attendance: 10,070; Referees: Chris Reid, Damian Lyons, Mitch Hare

=== Round 13 ===
26 December 2019	Melbourne United	75–77	Cairns Taipans	Melbourne Arena, Melbourne, Victoria
19:30	Scoring by quarter: 9–20, 21–26, 23–17, 22–14
ESPN	Pts: Trimble 16; Rebs: Long 12; Asts: Goulding, Ili, McCarron 2	boxscore broadcast report	Pts: Machado, Newbill 20; Rebs: Jawai 9 Asts: Machado 5	Attendance: 10,300; Referees: Michael Aylen, Scott Beker, Ruben Woolcock

27 December 2019	Brisbane Bullets	96–99	New Zealand Breakers	Nissan Arena, Brisbane, Queensland
18:30	Scoring by quarter: 29–17, 22–24, 31–30, 14–28
ESPN	Pts: Sobey 29; Rebs: Patterson 9 Asts: Patterson 8	boxscore report	Pts: Hopson 27; Rebs: Ashley, Delany 7 Asts: Henry, Hopson 4	Attendance: 4,059; Referees: Chris Reid, James Boyer, Toni Caldwell

28 December 2019	Sydney Kings	85–98	Perth Wildcats	Qudos Bank Arena, Sydney, New South Wales
17:30	Scoring by quarter: 22–24, 28–20, 15–26, 20–28
SBS Viceland	Pts: Ware 33; Rebs: Bogut 12; Asts: Bruce 4	boxscore report	Pts: Cotton 39; Rebs: Kay 10; Asts: Hunt 4	Attendance: 11,569; Referees: Vaughan Mayberry, Jon Chapman, Daniel Battye

28 December 2019	South East Melbourne Phoenix	112–102	Illawarra Hawks	Melbourne Arena, Melbourne, Victoria
20:00	Scoring by quarter: 29–27, 29–31, 33–23, 21–21
ESPN	Pts: Roberson 28; Rebs: Wesley 7 Asts: Roberson, Wesley 5	boxscore report	Pts: Blanchfield 22; Rebs: Dech, Ogilvy 6 Asts: Hobson, Naar 6	Attendance: 6,754; Referees: Scott Beker, Nathan Durant, Mark Grist

29 December 2019	Adelaide 36ers	87–96	New Zealand Breakers	Adelaide Entertainment Centre, Adelaide, South Australia
14:30	Scoring by quarter: 20–21, 25–23, 24–26, 18–26
SBS Viceland	Pts: Randle 28; Rebs: Johnson 10; Asts: Randle, Teys 4	boxscore report	Pts: Hopson 31; Rebs: Ashley 9 Asts: Henry 8	Attendance: 7,042; Referees: Michael Aylen, Damian Lyons, Mitch Hare

29 December 2019	Melbourne United	96–102	Brisbane Bullets	Melbourne Arena, Melbourne, Victoria
17:00	Scoring by quarter: 29–27, 22–28, 24–25, 21–22
SBS Viceland	Pts: Long 25; Rebs: Kidd, Long 8 Asts: Trimble 7	boxscore report	Pts: Patterson 35; Rebs: Hodgson 11; Asts: Gliddon 4	Attendance: 10,300; Referees: Vaughan Mayberry, Chris Reid, Nathan Durrant

31 December 2019	Illawarra Hawks	85–80	Sydney Kings	WIN Entertainment Centre, Wollongong, New South Wales
17:30	Scoring by quarter: 21–31, 20–15, 19–22, 25–12
SBS Viceland	Pts: Boone 21; Rebs: Boone 9 Asts: Naar 8	boxscore report	Pts: Tate 23; Rebs: Cooks 9 Asts: Kickert 5	Attendance: 5,064; Referees: Chris Reid, James Boyer, Mitch Hare

31 December 2019	Cairns Taipans	92–84	South East Melbourne Phoenix	Cairns Convention Centre, Cairns, Queensland
19:00	Scoring by quarter: 26–22, 11–21, 32–19, 23–22
ESPN	Pts: Machado 29; Rebs: Oliver 10; Asts: Machado 8	boxscore report	Pts: Roberson 19; Rebs: Pineau 9 Asts: Creek, Roberson 5	Attendance: 5,134; Referees: Vaughan Mayberry, Jon Chapman, Mark Mill

1 January 2020	Adelaide 36ers	100–97	Perth Wildcats	Adelaide Entertainment Centre, Adelaide, South Australia
17:00	Scoring by quarter: 25–27, 24–18, 29–21, 22–31
SBS Viceland	Pts: Griffin 24; Rebs: Johnson 7 Asts: Johnson 6	boxscore report	Pts: Cotton 22; Rebs: Majok 10; Asts: Cotton 4	Attendance: 6,973; Referees: Michael Aylen, Damien Lyons, Nathan Durant

=== Round 14 ===
3 January 2020	Cairns Taipans	91–89	Brisbane Bullets	Cairns Convention Centre, Cairns, Queensland
18:30	Scoring by quarter: 23–19, 25–24, 29–16, 14–30
ESPN	Pts: Newbill 28; Rebs: Oliver 12; Asts: Djeric, Machado 6	boxscore report	Pts: Singler 20; Rebs: Magnay 8 Asts: Patterson 6	Attendance: 4,573; Referees: Michael Aylen, Damian Lyons, Toni Caldwell

4 January 2020	Illawarra Hawks	91–104	Melbourne United	WIN Entertainment Centre, Wollongong, New South Wales
17:30	Scoring by quarter: 26–28, 24–27, 24–17, 17–32
SBS Viceland	Pts: Coenraad 18; Rebs: Boone 13; Asts: Hobson 9	boxscore report	Pts: Goulding, Kidd 21; Rebs: Long 7 Asts: Trimble 5	Attendance: 3,506; Referees: Chris Reid, Nathan Durrant, Rueben Woolcock

4 January 2020	Sydney Kings	91–77	Adelaide 36ers	Qudos Bank Arena, Sydney, New South Wales
20:00	Scoring by quarter: 25–23, 22–19, 26–13, 18–22
ESPN	Pts: Newley, Tate 20; Rebs: Bogut 10; Asts: Ware 6	boxscore report	Pts: Randle 24; Rebs: Johnson 11; Asts: Randle 6	Attendance: 9,023; Referees: Vaughan Mayberry, James Boyer, Daniel Battye

5 January 2020	South East Melbourne Phoenix	92–97	New Zealand Breakers	State Basketball Centre, Wantirna South, Victoria
15:00	Scoring by quarter: 24–27, 31–29, 24–25, 13–16
SBS Viceland	Pts: Roberson 31; Rebs: Pineau 19; Asts: Roberson, Wesley 6	boxscore report	Pts: Abercrombie 24; Rebs: Loe 7 Asts: Hopson 6	Attendance: 3,711; Referees: Michael Aylen, Damien Lyons, James Boyer

5 January 2020	Brisbane Bullets	97–85	Perth Wildcats	Nissan Arena, Brisbane, Queensland
16:00	Scoring by quarter: 28–20, 24–27, 21–21, 24–17
SBS Viceland	Pts: Patterson 35; Rebs: Magnay 9 Asts: Patterson, Sobey 4	boxscore report	Pts: Cotton 24; Rebs: Cotton 6 Asts: Kay 4	Attendance: 4,214; Referees: Vaughan Mayberry, Jon Chapman, Mitch Hare

6 January 2020	Adelaide 36ers	102–96	Illawarra Hawks	Adelaide Entertainment Centre, Adelaide, South Australia
19:00	Scoring by quarter: 32–32, 27–29, 28–22, 15–13
ESPN	Pts: Drmic 24; Rebs: Griffin 9 Asts: Teys 5	boxscore report	Pts: Blanchfield 35; Rebs: Boone 7 Asts: Dech, Hobson 4	Attendance: 7,889; Referees: Chris Reid, Jon Chapman, James Griguol

=== Round 15 ===
9 January 2020	Cairns Taipans	85–79	New Zealand Breakers	Cairns Convention Centre, Cairns, Queensland
18:30	Scoring by quarter: 20–25, 30–19, 14–20, 21–15
ESPN	Pts: Machado 29; Rebs: Oliver 8 Asts: Machado 3	boxscore report	Pts: Loe 24; Rebs: Abercrombie, Loe, Hopson 7 Asts: Hopson 8	Attendance: 4,392; Referees: Vaughan Mayberry, Toni Caldwell, Scott Beker

10 January 2020	Illawarra Hawks	77–99	Perth Wildcats	WIN Entertainment Centre, Wollongong, New South Wales
19:30	Scoring by quarter: 17–27, 19–27, 24–19, 17–26
ESPN	Pts: Blanchfield 26; Rebs: Blanchfield 8 Asts: Glover, Naar 4	boxscore broadcast report	Pts: Cotton 23; Rebs: Kay 10; Asts: Cotton 6	Attendance: 2,532; Referees: Chris Reid, James Boyer, Elliot Green

11 January 2020	Sydney Kings	92–83	Cairns Taipans	Qudos Bank Arena, Sydney, New South Wales
17:30	Scoring by quarter: 23–16, 21–21, 24–23, 24–23
SBS Viceland	Pts: Kickert 18; Rebs: Bogut, Cooks, Tate 8 Asts: Ware 4	boxscore report	Pts: Deng 18; Rebs: Oliver 7 Asts: Newbill 7	Attendance: 10,857; Referees: Chris Reid, Scott Beker, Nico Fernandez

11 January 2020	Adelaide 36ers	100–86	Melbourne United	Adelaide Entertainment Centre, Adelaide, South Australia
19:30	Scoring by quarter: 32–24, 21–24, 26–22, 21–16
ESPN	Pts: Randle 23; Rebs: Griffin 11; Asts: Drmic, Teys 4	boxscore report	Pts: Goulding 26; Rebs: Long 15; Asts: McCarron, Trimble 5	Attendance: 9,034; Referees: Michael Aylen, Jon Chapman, Nathan Durant

12 January 2020	New Zealand Breakers	85–95	Brisbane Bullets	Spark Arena, Auckland, New Zealand
17:00	Scoring by quarter: 18–15, 21–34, 25–20, 21–26
Sky Sport	Pts: Abercrombie, Henry 17; Rebs: Delany 6 Asts: Hopson 6	boxscore report	Pts: Patterson 18; Rebs: Hodgson 10; Asts: Patterson, Sobey 5	Attendance: 5,552; Referees: Vaughan Mayberry, Damian Lyons, Mitch Hare

12 January 2020	Illawarra Hawks	82–90	South East Melbourne Phoenix	WIN Entertainment Centre, Wollongong, New South Wales
17:00	Scoring by quarter: 26–18, 13–29, 23–28, 20–15
SBS Viceland	Pts: Blanchfield 15; Rebs: Froling 11; Asts: Hobson, Naar 3	boxscore report	Pts: Stephens 20; Rebs: Pineau 18; Asts: Roberson 7	Attendance: 3,398; Referees: Michael Aylen, Nico Fernandes, Elliot Green

=== Round 16 ===
17 January 2020	New Zealand Breakers	86–81	Sydney Kings	TSB Stadium, New Plymouth, New Zealand
19:30	Scoring by quarter: 24–24, 19–24, 25–22, 18–11
Sky Sport	Pts: Hopson 30; Rebs: Delany 13; Asts: Hopson 5	boxscore report	Pts: Tate 22; Rebs: Cooks 10; Asts: Ware 5	Attendance: 2,057; Referees: Michael Aylen, James Boyer, Mitch Hare

17 January 2020	Perth Wildcats	97–71	South East Melbourne Phoenix	RAC Arena, Perth, Western Australia
18:30	Scoring by quarter: 19–10, 25–23, 30–15, 23–23
ESPN	Pts: Cotton 25; Rebs: Majok 10; Asts: Cotton 7	boxscore broadcast report	Pts: Walker 16; Rebs: Pineau 8 Asts: Roberson 6	Attendance: 13,307; Referees: Vaughan Mayberry, Damian Lyons, Craig Copes

18 January 2020	Brisbane Bullets	106–77	Illawarra Hawks	Nissan Arena, Brisbane, Queensland
16:30	Scoring by quarter: 24–26, 23–21, 36–17, 23–13
SBS Viceland	Pts: Patterson 20; Rebs: Patterson 9 Asts: Cadee 6	boxscore report	Pts: Glover 18; Rebs: Boone 7 Asts: Naar 5	Attendance: 4,747; Referees: Jon Chapman, Toni Caldwell, Nico Fernandes

18 January 2020	Cairns Taipans	108–91	Adelaide 36ers	Cairns Convention Centre, Cairns, Queensland
19:00	Scoring by quarter: 30–18, 24–25, 31–28, 23–20
ESPN	Pts: Newbill 28; Rebs: Oliver 15; Asts: Machado 9	boxscore report	Pts: Johnson 38; Rebs: Randle 9 Asts: Randle 10	Attendance: 4,696; Referees: Chris Reid, Scott Beker, Daniel Battye

19 January 2020	New Zealand Breakers	90–68	Melbourne United	Spark Arena, Auckland, New Zealand
17:00	Scoring by quarter: 26–18, 20–17, 21–16, 23–17
Sky Sport	Pts: Hopson 22; Rebs: Delany 10; Asts: Abercrombie 5	boxscore report	Pts: Long 18; Rebs: Kidd, Long, Lual-Acuil, Trimble 4 Asts: Trimble 5	Attendance: 5,934; Referees: Michael Aylen, James Boyer, Mitch Hare

19 January 2020	Sydney Kings	98–81	South East Melbourne Phoenix	Qudos Bank Arena, Sydney, New South Wales
17:00	Scoring by quarter: 27–24, 30–26, 18–18, 23–13
SBS Viceland	Pts: Louzada 18; Rebs: Bogut 11; Asts: Bruce, Ware 6	boxscore report	Pts: Roberson 27; Rebs: Pineau 13; Asts: Roberson 4	Attendance: 9,332; Referees: Vaughan Mayberry, Chris Reid, Scott Beker

=== Round 17 ===
23 January 2020	Brisbane Bullets	108–101	South East Melbourne Phoenix	Nissan Arena, Brisbane, Queensland
18:30	Scoring by quarter: 26–27, 27–28, 24–25, 31–21
ESPN	Pts: Patterson 27; Rebs: Singler 9 Asts: Gliddon 6	boxscore broadcast report	Pts: Roberson 26; Rebs: Creek, Pineau 10; Asts: Adnam 7	Attendance: 2,735; Referees: Vaughan Mayberry, Toni Caldwell, Scott Beker

24 January 2020	Illawarra Hawks	79–102	Sydney Kings	WIN Entertainment Centre, Wollongong, New South Wales
19:30	Scoring by quarter: 16–22, 18–24, 23–26, 22–30
ESPN	Pts: Hobson 13; Rebs: Hobson 8 Asts: Hobson 6	boxscore report	Pts: Tate, Taylor 17; Rebs: Cooks 11; Asts: Bruce 5	Attendance: 4,021; Referees: Chris Reid, Nico Fernandez, Daniel Battye

25 January 2020	Adelaide 36ers	99–108	Brisbane Bullets	Adelaide Entertainment Centre, Adelaide, South Australia
17:00	Scoring by quarter: 27–28, 25–25, 25–28, 22–28
SBS Viceland	Pts: Griffin, Randle 21; Rebs: Johnson 10; Asts: Dillon, Randle 5	boxscore report	Pts: Patterson 29; Rebs: Hodgson 12; Asts: Sobey 6	Attendance: 7,807; Referees: Michael Aylen, James Boyer, James Griguol

25 January 2020	Perth Wildcats	80–79	New Zealand Breakers	RAC Arena, Perth, Western Australia
17:00	Scoring by quarter: 29–23, 16–22, 21–15, 14–19
ESPN	Pts: Cotton, Plumlee 23; Rebs: Plumlee 17; Asts: Cotton, Norton 4	boxscore report	Pts: Ashley 21; Rebs: Ashley 11; Asts: Hopson, Weeks 5	Attendance: 13,000; Referees: Vaughan Mayberry, Damian Lyons, Nico Fernandes

26 January 2020	South East Melbourne Phoenix	102–103	Cairns Taipans	State Basketball Centre, Wantirna South, Victoria
15:00	Scoring by quarter: 31–31, 20–24, 21–31, 30–17
SBS Viceland	Pts: Creek 32; Rebs: Creek 10; Asts: Roberson 7	boxscore report	Pts: Machado 24; Rebs: Oliver 9 Asts: Machado 8	Attendance: 3,685; Referees: Chris Reid, Nathan Durant, James Boyer

26 January 2020	Sydney Kings	106–88	Melbourne United	Qudos Bank Arena, Sydney, New South Wales
17:00	Scoring by quarter: 28–25, 20–20, 29–17, 29–26
SBS Viceland	Pts: Ware 26; Rebs: Cooks 10; Asts: Bogut 9	boxscore report	Pts: Trimble 26; Rebs: Kidd 7 Asts: Trimble 2	Attendance: 10,078; Referees: Michael Aylen, Damian Lyons, Scott Beker

=== Round 18 ===
29 January 2020	Melbourne United	77–67	Perth Wildcats	Melbourne Arena, Melbourne, Victoria
19:30	Scoring by quarter: 26–13, 14–21, 15–14, 22–19
ESPN	Pts: Goulding 17; Rebs: Lual-Acuil 10; Asts: Ili, McCarron, Trimble 3	boxscore broadcast report	Pts: Kay 23; Rebs: Kay 8 Asts: Norton 4	Attendance: 6,355; Referees: Vaughan Mayberry, Michael Aylen, Nathan Durant

31 January 2020	New Zealand Breakers	113–89	Adelaide 36ers	Spark Arena, Auckland, New Zealand
19:30	Scoring by quarter: 25–20, 24–25, 37–21, 27–23
Sky Sport	Pts: Abercrombie 31; Rebs: Delany 10; Asts: Henry 8	boxscore report	Pts: Johnson 24; Rebs: Johnson 9 Asts: Randle 6	Attendance: 6,372; Referees: Chris Reid, Scott Beker, Damian Lyons

31 January 2020	Cairns Taipans	99–75	Illawarra Hawks	Cairns Convention Centre, Cairns, Queensland
19:00	Scoring by quarter: 23–17, 34–23, 28–17, 14–18
ESPN	Pts: Newbill 20; Rebs: Krslovic, Oliver 5 Asts: Machado 10	boxscore report	Pts: Boone 19; Rebs: Boone 10; Asts: Dech, Hobson 4	Attendance: 5,168; Referees: Jon Chapman, Toni Caldwell, Nico Fernandes

1 February 2020	Brisbane Bullets	87–83	Melbourne United	Nissan Arena, Brisbane, Queensland
16:30	Scoring by quarter: 21–17, 17–30, 25–21, 24–15
SBS Viceland	Pts: Patterson 31; Rebs: Hodgson 14; Asts: Patterson 5	boxscore report	Pts: Trimble 36; Rebs: Long 9 Asts: Trimble 6	Attendance: 4,847; Referees: Chris Reid, James Boyer, Nico Fernandes

1 February 2020	Perth Wildcats	110–100	Sydney Kings	RAC Arena, Perth, Western Australia
17:00	Scoring by quarter: 31–27, 29–25, 29–21, 21–27
ESPN	Pts: Cotton 30; Rebs: Kay 10; Asts: Norton 5	boxscore report	Pts: Tate 23; Rebs: Tate 12; Asts: Bruce 5	Attendance: 13,309; Referees: Vaughan Mayberry, Michael Aylen, Nathan Durant

2 February 2020	Illawarra Hawks	56–65	New Zealand Breakers	WIN Entertainment Centre, Wollongong, New South Wales
15:00	Scoring by quarter: 14–30, 20–20, 18–15
SBS Viceland	Pts: Boone 14; Rebs: Dech 6 Asts: Naar 8	boxscore report	Pts: Henry 17; Rebs: Delany 5 Asts: Hopson 9	Attendance: 3,769; Referees: Scott Beker, Damian Lyons, Daniel Battye

2 February 2020	Adelaide 36ers	100–93	South East Melbourne Phoenix	Adelaide Entertainment Centre, Adelaide, South Australia
16:30	Scoring by quarter: 32–19, 13–19, 17–23, 29–24
SBS Viceland	Pts: Randle 35; Rebs: Drmic 10; Asts: Teys 6	boxscore report	Pts: Creek 27; Rebs: Pineau 11; Asts: Creek 5	Attendance: 7,066; Referees: Vaughan Mayberry, Michael Aylen, Mitch Hare

=== Round 19 ===
7 February 2020	Brisbane Bullets	87–91	New Zealand Breakers	Nissan Arena, Brisbane, Queensland
18:30	Scoring by quarter: 31–30, 21–23, 18–19, 17–19
ESPN	Pts: Sobey 30; Rebs: Magnay 11; Asts: Sobey 3	boxscore broadcast report	Pts: Hopson 31; Rebs: Delany 12; Asts: Henry 5	Attendance: 3,948; Referees: Vaughn Mayberry, Chris Reid, Toni Caldwell

8 February 2020	Melbourne United	95–72	Illawarra Hawks	Melbourne Arena, Melbourne, Victoria
17:30	Scoring by quarter: 24–18, 22–16, 27–23, 22–15
SBS Viceland	Pts: Goulding 20; Rebs: Kidd 10; Asts: Trimble 9	boxscore report	Pts: Ogilvy 15; Rebs: Hobson 7 Asts: Ogilvy 7	Attendance: 10,300; Referees: Jon Chapman, Scott Beker, Marty Davidson

8 February 2020	Adelaide 36ers	80–99	Cairns Taipans	Adelaide Entertainment Centre, Adelaide, South Australia
19:30	Scoring by quarter: 20–27, 25–30, 16–17, 19–25
ESPN	Pts: Johnson 14; Rebs: Griffin 9 Asts: Johnson, Randle 5	boxscore report	Pts: Oliver 31; Rebs: Oliver 11; Asts: Machado 6	Attendance: 7,993; Referees: Michael Aylen, Damian Lyons, Nathan Durant

9 February 2020	South East Melbourne Phoenix	96–99(OT)	Sydney Kings	Melbourne Arena, Melbourne, Victoria
15:00	Scoring by quarter: 20–28, 21–15, 21–19, 27–27, Overtime: 7–10
SBS Viceland	Pts: Adnam, Roberson 19; Rebs: Pineau 13; Asts: Roberson 6	boxscore report	Pts: Ware 24; Rebs: Cooks 13; Asts: Cooks, Newley 3	Attendance: 5,598; Referees: Vaughan Mayberry, Chris Reid, Damian Lyons

9 February 2020	Perth Wildcats	85–72	Brisbane Bullets	RAC Arena, Perth, Western Australia
14:00	Scoring by quarter: 21–19, 20–20, 19–16, 25–17
SBS Viceland	Pts: Cotton 25; Rebs: Kay 8 Asts: Cotton, Kay 5	boxscore report	Pts: Patterson 25; Rebs: Patterson 11; Asts: Taylor Braun, Patterson 3	Attendance: 13,501; Referees: Michael Aylen, James Boyer, Nico Fernandes

=== Round 20 ===
13 February 2020	Melbourne United	99–83	Cairns Taipans	Melbourne Arena, Melbourne, Victoria
19:30	Scoring by quarter: 20–18, 25–24, 23–25, 31–16
ESPN	Pts: Goulding 23; Rebs: Long 10; Asts: McCarron 8	boxscore broadcast report	Pts: Oliver 19; Rebs: Oliver 14; Asts: Machado 9	Attendance: 6,315; Referees: Vaughan Mayberry, Damian Lyons, Mitch Hare

14 February 2020	New Zealand Breakers	92–83	South East Melbourne Phoenix	Horncastle Arena, Christchurch, New Zealand
19:30	Scoring by quarter: 22–24, 24–15, 17–24, 29–20
Sky Sport	Pts: Hopson 23; Rebs: Abercrombie, Ashley, Loe, Hopson 5 Asts: Hopson 10	boxscore report	Pts: Roberson 15; Rebs: Pineau 7 Asts: Roberson 8	Attendance: 5,053; Referees: Michael Aylen, Daniel Battye, James Grigoul

14 February 2020	Sydney Kings	98–82	Illawarra Hawks	Qudos Bank Arena, Sydney, New South Wales
20:00	Scoring by quarter: 31–26, 26–17, 17–14, 24–25
ESPN	Pts: Tate, Ware 19; Rebs: Cooks 11; Asts: Newley, Taylor, Ware 3	boxscore report	Pts: Dech 26; Rebs: Glover 8 Asts: Glover 4	Attendance: 11,047; Referees: Scott Beker, Jon Chapman, Marty Davidson

15 February 2020	Brisbane Bullets	124–88	Cairns Taipans	Nissan Arena, Brisbane, Queensland
16:30	Scoring by quarter: 39–15, 24–30, 35–24, 26–19
SBS Viceland	Pts: Sobey 30; Rebs: Hodgson, Singler 9 Asts: Singler, Sobey 6	boxscore report	Pts: Deng 20; Rebs: Krslovic 8 Asts: Djeric 4	Attendance: 5,145; Referees: Chris Reid, Toni Caldwell, Nico Fernandes

15 February 2020	Perth Wildcats	94–79	Adelaide 36ers	RAC Arena, Perth, Western Australia
17:00	Scoring by quarter: 24–18, 23–18, 22–27, 25–16
ESPN	Pts: Kay 23; Rebs: Norton; Asts: Norton 5	boxscore report	Pts: Johnson 18; Rebs: Johnson 11; Asts: Froling 5	Attendance: 13,493; Referees: Vaughan Mayberry, James Boyer, Mitch Hare

16 February 2020	South East Melbourne Phoenix	90–109	Melbourne United	Melbourne Arena, Melbourne, Victoria
15:00	Scoring by quarter: 24–34, 22–21, 27–26, 17–28
SBS Viceland	Pts: Madgen 23; Rebs: Wesley 6 Asts: Adnam 7	boxscore report	Pts: Goulding 28; Rebs: Long 11; Asts: McCarron 7	Attendance: 9,501; Referees: Michael Aylen, Damian Lyons, Jon Chapman

== Ladder ==
Pos	2019–20 NBL season											
Pos	Team	Pld	W	L	PCT	Last 5	Streak	Home	Away	PF	PA	PP
1	Sydney Kings	28	20	8	71.43%	4–1	W2	12–2	8–6	2642	2472	106.88%
2	Perth Wildcats	28	19	9	67.86%	4–1	W3	11–3	8–6	2529	2409	104.98%
3	Cairns Taipans	28	16	12	57.14%	3–2	L2	11–3	5–9	2587	2547	101.57%
4	Melbourne United	28	15	13	53.57%	4–1	W3	9–5	6–8	2638	2560	103.05%
5	Brisbane Bullets	28	15	13	53.57%	3–2	W1	10–4	5–9	2607	2557	101.96%
6	New Zealand Breakers	28	15	13	53.57%	4–1	W4	9–5	6–8	2514	2468	101.86%
7	Adelaide 36ers	28	12	16	42.86%	1–4	L2	8–6	4–10	2654	2768	95.88%
8	S.E. Melbourne Phoenix	28	9	19	32.14%	0–5	L8	6–8	3–11	2671	2761	96.74%
9	Illawarra Hawks	28	5	23	17.86%	0–5	L10	3–11	2–12	2354	2654	88.70%

Updated to match(es) played on 16 February 2020. Source: NBL.com.au

Preceded by 2018–19 season	NBL seasons 2019–20	Succeeded by 2020–21 season
