= 2019–20 Brisbane Bullets season =

Australian basketball club season

- Head coach: (Australia) Andrej Lemanis
- Captain: Rotating captaincy
- Arena: Nissan Arena

NBL results
- Record: 15–13 (53.6%)
- Ladder: 5th
- Finals finish: Did not qualify
- Stats at NBL.com.au

Player records
- Points: (United States) Patterson 21.4
- Rebounds: (Australia) Hodgson 6.4
- Assists: (United States) Patterson 4.5

Uniforms
Home	Away
- All statistics correct as of 21 April 2020.

The 2019–20 NBL season was the 34th season for the Brisbane Bullets in the NBL, and the 4th since their return to the league.

== Roster ==
2019–20 Brisbane Bullets roster
Players
Coaches

Pos.	No.	Nat.	Name	Ht.	Wt.
F	1	(United States)	Braun, Taylor (I)	2.01 m (6 ft 7 in)	95 kg (209 lb)
F	2	(Australia)	Dennis, Kian (DP)	1.97 m (6 ft 6 in)	83 kg (183 lb)
G	3	(Australia)	Gliddon, Cameron	1.97 m (6 ft 6 in)	94 kg (207 lb)
G	5	(Australia)	Cadee, Jason (C)	1.86 m (6 ft 1 in)	80 kg (176 lb)
C	6	(Australia)	Hodgson, Matt	2.11 m (6 ft 11 in)	115 kg (254 lb)
F	8	(Australia)	Goldfinch, Cameron (DP)	2.01 m (6 ft 7 in)	86 kg (190 lb)
F/C	9	(Australia)	Dalton, Callum (DP)	2.06 m (6 ft 9 in)	113 kg (249 lb)
F	12	(Australia)	Magnay, Will	2.08 m (6 ft 10 in)	106 kg (234 lb)
F	13	(United States)	Patterson, Lamar (I)	1.96 m (6 ft 5 in)	102 kg (225 lb)
F	14	(New Zealand)	Vukona, Mika (C)	1.97 m (6 ft 6 in)	103 kg (227 lb)
G	20	(Australia)	Sobey, Nathan	1.88 m (6 ft 2 in)	86 kg (190 lb)
C	24	(New Zealand)	Harrison, Tyrell	2.13 m (7 ft 0 in)	95 kg (209 lb)
G/F	25	(New Zealand)	Te Rangi, Reuben	1.98 m (6 ft 6 in)	100 kg (220 lb)
G	33	(United States)	Singler, E. J. (I)	1.98 m (6 ft 6 in)	98 kg (216 lb)
G		(Australia)	Williams, Verle (TP)	1.80 m (5 ft 11 in)

Head coach

- (Australia) Andrej Lemanis

Assistant coach(es)

- (Australia) C. J. Bruton
- (Australia) Sam Mackinnon
- (Australia) Mick Downer

Legend

- (C) Team captain
- (DP) Development player
- (IN) Inactive
- (I) Import player
- (TP) Training player
- (NS) Next Star player
- Injured

- Roster
Updated: 1 February 2020

=== Depth chart ===
Pos.	Starting 5	Bench 1	Bench 2	Development
C	Matt Hodgson	Will Magnay	Tyrell Harrison
PF	Taylor Braun	Mika Vukona	Cameron Goldfinch	Callum Dalton
SF	Lamar Patterson	Reuben Te Rangi		Kian Dennis
SG	Cameron Gliddon	E. J. Singler
PG	Nathan Sobey	Jason Cadee

== Preseason ==
As part of their pre-season, the Bullets played five pre-season games. Their first game were held in Brisbane against the Creighton Bluejays, with the next two games being held in Melbourne against the South East Melbourne Phoenix and Melbourne United. After that they played two games in Cairns against the Cairns Taipans, and as a club in the NBL they also took part in the NBL Blitz where they played games against the Adelaide 36ers and the NBL1 All-Stars. They rounded off their pre-season on the Sunshine Coast against the Perth Wildcats, and they opted out of the NBLxNBA games.

=== Ladder ===
2019–20 NBL pre-season ladder
Ladder
Information

Pos.	Nat.	Name	Pld.	W.	L.	Last 5	Streak	Home	Away	For	Against	Pts %	Win %
1	(Australia)	Sydney	5	4	1	4–1	W3	1–0	3–1	486	394	123.35%	80.00%
2	(Australia)	Cairns	9	6	3	4–1	W4	3–1	3–2	811	763	106.29%	66.67%
3	(Australia)	S.E. Melbourne (NT)	9	6	3	4–1	W2	3–2	3–1	819	784	104.46%	66.67%
4	(Australia)	Melbourne	12	6	6	2–3	L2	4–3	2–3	1167	1095	106.58%	50.00%
5	(Australia)	Brisbane	8	4	4	3–2	W3	1–1	3–3	676	676	100.00%	50.00%
6	(Australia)	Illawarra	6	3	3	2–3	L2	1–1	2–2	598	631	94.77%	50.00%
7	(Australia)	Adelaide	10	4	6	1–4	L2	1–1	3–5	892	920	96.96%	40.00%
8	(Australia)	Perth (RC)	7	2	5	1–4	L1	1–2	1–3	625	671	93.14%	28.57%
9	(New Zealand)	New Zealand	6	1	5	0–5	L5	0–0	1–5	501	574	87.28%	16.67%

Total Rounds
11 weeks

Total Games
46 games

Legend
- (NT) New Team
- (RC) Reigning Champion

- Updated: 17 October 2019

=== Game log ===
2019–20 pre-season game log
Pre-Season: 1–4 (Home: 0–1; Road: 1–3)

Game	Date	Team	Score	High points	High rebounds	High assists	Location Attendance	Record
1	13 August	Creighton Bluejays	L 79 - 107	Not announced	Not announced	Not announced	NAB Stadium	0-1
2	6 September	@ South East Melbourne Phoenix	L 85-80	Lamar Patterson (19)	Lamar Patterson (7)	Jason Cadee, Tamuri Wigness (3)	Traralgon Sports Stadium	0-2
3	8 September	@ Melbourne United	W 80-102	Taylor Braun (22)	Will Magnay, E. J. Singler (7)	Lamar Patterson (6)	Melbourne Sports and Aquatic Centre	1-2
4	13 September	@ Cairns Taipans	L 104-66	E. J. Singler (10)	Will Magnay (6)	E. J. Singler (4)	Early Settler Stadium	1-3
5	15 September	@ Cairns Taipans	L 76-66	Lamar Patterson (21)	Will Magnay (7)	Jason Cadee (8)	Early Settler Stadium	1-4

NBL Blitz : 1–0 (Home: 0–0; Road: 1–0)

Game	Date	Team	Score	High points	High rebounds	High assists	Location Attendance	Record
1	19 September	NBL1 All-Stars	W 106-57	E. J. Singler (19)	Taylor Braun (8)	Lamar Patterson (10)	Ulverstone Sports & Leisure Centre	1-0
2	21 September	Adelaide 36ers	W 85-92	Lamar Patterson (20)	Matt Hodgson (7)	Lamar Patterson (8)	Silverdome	2-0

Pre-Season: 1–0 (Home: 1–0; Road: 0–0)

Game	Date	Team	Score	High points	High rebounds	High assists	Location Attendance	Record
6	27 September	Perth Wildcats	W 85-82	Lamar Patterson (26)	Tyrell Harrison (6)	Nathan Sobey (7)	University of the Sunshine Coast	2-4

== Regular season ==
The regular season of the NBL consisted of 28 games, with the Bullet's 14 home games played at Nissan Arena after moving from the Brisbane Convention & Exhibition Centre and the Brisbane Entertainment Centre during the off-season.

=== Ladder ===
Pos	2019–20 NBL season											
Pos	Team	Pld	W	L	PCT	Last 5	Streak	Home	Away	PF	PA	PP
1	Sydney Kings	28	20	8	71.43%	4–1	W2	12–2	8–6	2642	2472	106.88%
2	Perth Wildcats	28	19	9	67.86%	4–1	W3	11–3	8–6	2529	2409	104.98%
3	Cairns Taipans	28	16	12	57.14%	3–2	L2	11–3	5–9	2587	2547	101.57%
4	Melbourne United	28	15	13	53.57%	4–1	W3	9–5	6–8	2638	2560	103.05%
5	Brisbane Bullets	28	15	13	53.57%	3–2	W1	10–4	5–9	2607	2557	101.96%
6	New Zealand Breakers	28	15	13	53.57%	4–1	W4	9–5	6–8	2514	2468	101.86%
7	Adelaide 36ers	28	12	16	42.86%	1–4	L2	8–6	4–10	2654	2768	95.88%
8	S.E. Melbourne Phoenix	28	9	19	32.14%	0–5	L8	6–8	3–11	2671	2761	96.74%
9	Illawarra Hawks	28	5	23	17.86%	0–5	L10	3–11	2–12	2354	2654	88.70%

Updated to match(es) played on 16 February 2020. Source: NBL.com.au

=== Ladder progression ===
- Numbers highlighted in green indicate that the team finished the round inside the top four.
- Numbers highlighted in blue indicates the team finished first on the ladder in that round.
- Numbers highlighted in red indicates the team finished last place on the ladder in that round.

2019–20 NBL season
Team	1	2	3	4	5	6	7	8	9	10	11	12	13	14	15	16	17	18	19	20
Adelaide 36ers	–	8	4	4	5	6	6	5	5	6	4	5	5	5	5	7	7	7	7	7
Brisbane Bullets	2	4	5	5	4	5	5	6	7	7	7	7	8	7	6	5	4	4	5	5
Cairns Taipans	7	7	6	6	8	8	7	7	6	4	6	4	4	4	3	3	3	3	3	3
Illawarra Hawks	6	5	7	9	9	9	9	8	9	9	9	9	9	9	9	9	9	9	9	9
Melbourne United	5	6	8	8	6	4	3	3	4	3	3	3	3	3	4	4	5	6	6	4
New Zealand Breakers	–	–	9	7	7	7	8	9	8	8	8	8	7	6	8	6	6	5	4	6
Perth Wildcats	4	2	3	2	2	3	2	2	2	2	2	2	2	2	2	2	2	2	2	2
S.E. Melbourne Phoenix	3	3	2	3	3	2	4	4	3	5	5	6	6	8	7	8	8	8	8	8
Sydney Kings	1	1	1	1	1	1	1	1	1	1	1	1	1	1	1	1	1	1	1	1

=== Game log ===
2019–20 game log
October: 2–3 (Home: 1–0; Road: 1–3)

Game	Date	Team	Score	High points	High rebounds	High assists	Location Attendance	Record
1	6 October	@ Illawarra Hawks	W 81-90	Lamar Patterson (25)	Cameron Gliddon (9)	Taylor Braun (6)	WIN Entertainment Centre	1-0
2	11 October	Cairns Taipans	W 90-74	Nathan Sobey (21)	Lamar Patterson (6)	Braun, Patterson, Sobey (5)	Nissan Arena	2-0
3	13 October	@ South East Melbourne Phoenix	L 113-93	Lamar Patterson (30)	Taylor Braun, Nathan Sobey (6)	Nathan Sobey (7)	Melbourne Arena	2-1
4	19 October	@ Adelaide 36ers	L 104-98	Lamar Patterson (21)	Taylor Braun, Hodgson (5)	Lamar Patterson (6)	Adelaide Entertainment Centre	2-2
5	26 October	@ Sydney Kings	L 94-79	Nathan Sobey (21)	Taylor Braun (5)	Braun, Hodgson, Patterson (3)	Qudos Bank Arena	2-3

November: 3–4 (Home: 2–2; Road: 1–2)

Game	Date	Team	Score	High points	High rebounds	High assists	Location Attendance	Record
6	1 November	Perth Wildcats	W 87-78	Jason Cadee (17)	Lamar Patterson, Nathan Sobey (7)	Jason Cadee (5)	Nissan Arena	3-3
7	3 November	@ Illawarra Hawks	W 69-83	Nathan Sobey (18)	Matt Hodgson (9)	Lamar Patterson (7)	AIS Arena	4-3
8	8 November	Sydney Kings	L 85-95	Lamar Patterson (22)	Lamar Patterson (11)	Lamar Patterson (7)	Nissan Arena	4-4
9	16 November	@ Cairns Taipans	L 94-85	Nathan Sobey (20)	Matt Hodgson (9)	Nathan Sobey (7)	Cairns Convention Centre	4-5
10	22 November	Adelaide 36ers	W 106-104	Lamar Patterson (27)	Lamar Patterson (6)	E. J. Singler (6)	Nissan Arena	5-5
11	24 November	@ Melbourne United	L 108-94	Jason Cadee (18)	Matt Hodgson, Lamar Patterson (7)	Lamar Patterson (8)	Melbourne Arena	5-6
12	30 November	South East Melbourne Phoenix	L 95-110	Jason Cadee (15)	Will Magnay (7)	Lamar Patterson (8)	Nissan Arena	5-7

December: 3–3 (Home: 2–1; Road: 1–2)

Game	Date	Team	Score	High points	High rebounds	High assists	Location Attendance	Record
13	7 December	Illawarra Hawks	W 101-91	Lamar Patterson (19)	Matt Hodgson (9)	Lamar Patterson (6)	Nissan Arena	6-7
14	9 December	@ New Zealand Breakers	L 96-85	Lamar Patterson (36)	Matt Hodgson (9)	Lamar Patterson (6)	Spark Arena	6-8
15	14 December	@ Perth Wildcats	L 86-78	Nathan Sobey (15)	Matt Hodgson, Lamar Patterson (8)	Jason Cadee (4)	RAC Arena	6-9
16	21 December	Sydney Kings	W 87-80	Will Magnay (23)	Will Magnay (14)	E. J. Singler (6)	Nissan Arena	7-9
17	27 December	New Zealand Breakers	L 96-99	Nathan Sobey (29)	Lamar Patterson (9)	Lamar Patterson (8)	Nissan Arena	7-10
18	29 December	@ Melbourne United	W 96-102	Lamar Patterson (35)	Matt Hodgson (11)	Cameron Gliddon (4)	Melbourne Arena	8-10

January: 5–1 (Home: 3–0; Road: 2–1)

Game	Date	Team	Score	High points	High rebounds	High assists	Location Attendance	Record
19	3 January	@ Cairns Taipans	L 91-89	E. J. Singler (20)	Will Magnay (8)	Lamar Patterson (6)	Cairns Convention Centre	8-11
20	5 January	Perth Wildcats	97-85	Lamar Patterson (35)	Will Magnay (9)	Lamar Patterson, Nathan Sobey (4)	Nissan Arena	9-11
21	12 January	@ New Zealand Breakers	W 85-95	Lamar Patterson (18)	Matt Hodgson (10)	Lamar Patterson, Nathan Sobey (5)	Spark Arena	10-11
22	18 January	Illawarra Hawks	W 106-77	Lamar Patterson (20)	Lamar Patterson (9)	Jason Cadee (6)	Nissan Arena	11-11
23	23 January	South East Melbourne Phoenix	W 108-101	Lamar Patterson (27)	E. J. Singler (9)	Cameron Gliddon (6)	Nissan Arena	12-11
24	25 January	@ Adelaide 36ers	W 99-108	Lamar Patterson (29)	Matt Hodgson (12)	Nathan Sobey (6)	Adelaide Entertainment Centre	13-11

February: 2–2 (Home: 2–1; Road: 0–1)

Game	Date	Team	Score	High points	High rebounds	High assists	Location Attendance	Record
25	1 February	Melbourne United	W 87-83	Lamar Patterson (31)	Matt Hodgson (14)	Lamar Patterson (5)	Nissan Arena	14-11
26	7 February	New Zealand Breakers	L 87-91	Nathan Sobey (30)	Will Magnay (11)	Nathan Sobey (3)	Nissan Arena	14-12
27	9 February	@ Perth Wildcats	L 85-72	Lamar Patterson (25)	Lamar Patterson (11)	Taylor Braun, Lamar Patterson (3)	RAC Arena	14-13
28	15 February	Cairns Taipans	W 124-88	Nathan Sobey (30)	Matt Hodgson, E. J. Singler (9)	E. J. Singler, Nathan Sobey (6)	Nissan Arena	15-13

== Awards ==
=== Player of the Week ===
Round 5, Jason Cadee

Round 13, Lamar Patterson

== See also ==
- 2019–20 NBL season
- Brisbane Bullets
