= 2019–20 Illawarra Hawks season =

Australian basketball club season

- Head coach: (Australia) Matt Flinn
- Co-captains: (Australia) David Andersen (Australia) Todd Blanchfield
- Arena: Wollongong Entertainment Centre

NBL results
- Record: 5–23 (17.9%)
- Ladder: 9th
- Finals finish: Did not qualify
- Stats at NBL.com.au

Player records
- Points: (United States) Brooks 17.9
- Rebounds: (United States) Ball 7.5
- Assists: (United States) Ball 7.0

Uniforms
Home	Away
- All statistics correct as of 21 April 2020.

The 2019–20 Illawarra Hawks season was the 42nd season of the franchise in the National Basketball League (NBL).

== Roster ==
2019–20 Illawarra Hawks roster
Players
Coaches

Pos.	No.	Nat.	Name	Ht.	Wt.
G	0	(United States)	Brooks, Aaron (injured) (I)	1.83 m (6 ft 0 in)	73 kg (161 lb)
G	1	(United States)	Ball, LaMelo (injured) (NS)	1.98 m (6 ft 6 in)	82 kg (181 lb)
G/F	2	(United States)	Hobson, Darington (I)	2.01 m (6 ft 7 in)	94 kg (207 lb)
C	3	(United States)	Boone, Josh (I)	2.08 m (6 ft 10 in)	108 kg (238 lb)
C	6	(Australia)	Ogilvy, Andrew	2.11 m (6 ft 11 in)	115 kg (254 lb)
G	10	(Australia)	Glover, Angus	1.93 m (6 ft 4 in)	87 kg (192 lb)
G/F	11	(Australia)	Grida, Daniel	1.95 m (6 ft 5 in)	88 kg (194 lb)
F/C	13	(Australia)	Andersen, David (C)	2.11 m (6 ft 11 in)	113 kg (249 lb)
F/C	17	(Australia)	Froling, Sam	2.12 m (6 ft 11 in)	104 kg (229 lb)
F	20	(New Zealand)	Harris, Hyrum (DP)	1.98 m (6 ft 6 in)	105 kg (231 lb)
G/F	21	(Australia)	Blanchfield, Todd (C)	2.00 m (6 ft 7 in)	94 kg (207 lb)
F	22	(Australia)	Coenraad, Tim	1.99 m (6 ft 6 in)	97 kg (214 lb)
G	41	(Australia)	Naar, Emmett	1.85 m (6 ft 1 in)	88 kg (194 lb)
G	44	(South Sudan)	Dech, Sunday	1.95 m (6 ft 5 in)	93 kg (205 lb)
G	79	(New Zealand)	Dent, Lachlan (DP)	1.84 m (6 ft 0 in)

Head coach

- (Australia) Matt Flinn

Assistant coach(es)

- (Australia) Ben Bagoly
- (United States) Eric Cooks
- (Australia) Tyson Demos
- (United States) Cortez Groves

Legend

- (C) Team captain
- (DP) Development player
- (I) Import player
- (NS) Next Star player
- Injured

- Roster
Updated: 24 December 2019

=== Depth chart ===
Pos.	Starting 5	Bench 1	Bench 2	Development
C	Josh Boone	Andrew Ogilvy
PF	Tim Coenraad	David Andersen	Samson Froling	Dyrum Harris
SF	Darington Hobson	Daniel Grida
SG	Sunday Dech	Angus Glover	Aaron Brooks	Lachlan Dent
PG	Todd Blanchfield	Emmett Naar	LaMelo Ball

== Preseason ==
The Hawks started their preseason later than most teams, with their first game on 7 September. They played three regular preseason games (two of which were against other NBL teams) before playing in the NBL Blitz against Melbourne United and the Perth Wildcats. The Hawks then continued their preseason with a final regular game against the Sydney Kings, however opted against playing more games in the NBLxNBA series.

=== Ladder ===
2019–20 NBL pre-season ladder
Ladder
Information

Pos.	Nat.	Name	Pld.	W.	L.	Last 5	Streak	Home	Away	For	Against	Pts %	Win %
1	(Australia)	Sydney	5	4	1	4–1	W3	1–0	3–1	486	394	123.35%	80.00%
2	(Australia)	Cairns	9	6	3	4–1	W4	3–1	3–2	811	763	106.29%	66.67%
3	(Australia)	S.E. Melbourne (NT)	9	6	3	4–1	W2	3–2	3–1	819	784	104.46%	66.67%
4	(Australia)	Melbourne	12	6	6	2–3	L2	4–3	2–3	1167	1095	106.58%	50.00%
5	(Australia)	Brisbane	8	4	4	3–2	W3	1–1	3–3	676	676	100.00%	50.00%
6	(Australia)	Illawarra	6	3	3	2–3	L2	1–1	2–2	598	631	94.77%	50.00%
7	(Australia)	Adelaide	10	4	6	1–4	L2	1–1	3–5	892	920	96.96%	40.00%
8	(Australia)	Perth (RC)	7	2	5	1–4	L1	1–2	1–3	625	671	93.14%	28.57%
9	(New Zealand)	New Zealand	6	1	5	0–5	L5	0–0	1–5	501	574	87.28%	16.67%

Total Rounds
11 weeks

Total Games
46 games

Legend
- (NT) New Team
- (RC) Reigning Champion

- Updated: 17 October 2019

=== Game log ===
2019–20 pre-season game log
Pre-Season: 2–1 (Home: 1–0; Road: 1–1)

Game	Date	Team	Score	High points	High rebounds	High assists	Location Attendance	Record
1	7 September	Indigenous All Stars	W 110-87	Todd Blanchfield (14)	David Andersen (8)	Emmett Naar (6)	WIN Entertainment Centre	1-0
2	13 September	@ Melbourne United	L 111-70	LaMelo Ball (14)	Samson Froling (8)	Aaron Brooks (4)	Ballarat Sports Events Centre	1-1
3	15 September	@ South East Melbourne Phoenix	W 98-109	Josh Boone (22)	Andrew Ogilvy, Josh Boone (8)	Josh Boone (6)	Lauren Jackson Sports Centre	2-1

NBL Blitz: 1–1 (Home: 0–0; Road: 1–1)

Game	Date	Team	Score	High points	High rebounds	High assists	Location Attendance	Record
1	20 September	Perth Wildcats	W 122-119	Todd Blanchfield (24)	LaMelo Ball (13)	LaMelo Ball, Andrew Ogilvy (7)	Kingborough Sports Centre	1-0
2	22 September	Melbourne United	L 110-91	Angus Glover (17)	Tim Coenraad (6)	Emmett Naar (6)	Derwent Entertainment Centre	1-1

Pre-Season: 0–1 (Home: 0–1; Road: 0–0)

Game	Date	Team	Score	High points	High rebounds	High assists	Location Attendance	Record
4	29 September	Sydney Kings	L 96-106	Aaron Brooks (28)	Josh Boone (7)	Emmett Naar (7)	WIN Entertainment Centre	2-2

== Regular season ==
The regular season of the NBL consisted of 28 games, with the Hawks's hosting 13 home games at the WIN Entertainment Centre and one at AIS Arena.

=== Standings ===
Pos	2019–20 NBL season											
Pos	Team	Pld	W	L	PCT	Last 5	Streak	Home	Away	PF	PA	PP
1	Sydney Kings	28	20	8	71.43%	4–1	W2	12–2	8–6	2642	2472	106.88%
2	Perth Wildcats	28	19	9	67.86%	4–1	W3	11–3	8–6	2529	2409	104.98%
3	Cairns Taipans	28	16	12	57.14%	3–2	L2	11–3	5–9	2587	2547	101.57%
4	Melbourne United	28	15	13	53.57%	4–1	W3	9–5	6–8	2638	2560	103.05%
5	Brisbane Bullets	28	15	13	53.57%	3–2	W1	10–4	5–9	2607	2557	101.96%
6	New Zealand Breakers	28	15	13	53.57%	4–1	W4	9–5	6–8	2514	2468	101.86%
7	Adelaide 36ers	28	12	16	42.86%	1–4	L2	8–6	4–10	2654	2768	95.88%
8	S.E. Melbourne Phoenix	28	9	19	32.14%	0–5	L8	6–8	3–11	2671	2761	96.74%
9	Illawarra Hawks	28	5	23	17.86%	0–5	L10	3–11	2–12	2354	2654	88.70%

Updated to match(es) played on 16 February 2020. Source: NBL.com.au

=== Ladder progression ===
- Numbers highlighted in green indicate that the team finished the round inside the top four.
- Numbers highlighted in blue indicates the team finished first on the ladder in that round.
- Numbers highlighted in red indicates the team finished last place on the ladder in that round.

2019–20 NBL season
Team	1	2	3	4	5	6	7	8	9	10	11	12	13	14	15	16	17	18	19	20
Adelaide 36ers	–	8	4	4	5	6	6	5	5	6	4	5	5	5	5	7	7	7	7	7
Brisbane Bullets	2	4	5	5	4	5	5	6	7	7	7	7	8	7	6	5	4	4	5	5
Cairns Taipans	7	7	6	6	8	8	7	7	6	4	6	4	4	4	3	3	3	3	3	3
Illawarra Hawks	6	5	7	9	9	9	9	8	9	9	9	9	9	9	9	9	9	9	9	9
Melbourne United	5	6	8	8	6	4	3	3	4	3	3	3	3	3	4	4	5	6	6	4
New Zealand Breakers	–	–	9	7	7	7	8	9	8	8	8	8	7	6	8	6	6	5	4	6
Perth Wildcats	4	2	3	2	2	3	2	2	2	2	2	2	2	2	2	2	2	2	2	2
S.E. Melbourne Phoenix	3	3	2	3	3	2	4	4	3	5	5	6	6	8	7	8	8	8	8	8
Sydney Kings	1	1	1	1	1	1	1	1	1	1	1	1	1	1	1	1	1	1	1	1

=== Game log ===
2019–20 game log
October: 1–6 (Home: 1–3; Road: 0–3)

Game	Date	Team	Score	High points	High rebounds	High assists	Location Attendance	Record
1	6 October	Brisbane Bullets	L 81-90	Aaron Brooks (23)	LaMelo Ball (10)	LaMelo Ball (5)	WIN Entertainment Centre	0-1
2	11 October	@ Perth Wildcats	L 103-76	LaMelo Ball (15)	Josh Boone (12)	LaMelo Ball (8)	RAC Arena	0-2
3	14 October	Cairns Taipans	W 89-88	Todd Blanchfield (20)	Andrew Ogilvy (6)	Aaron Brooks (6)	WIN Entertainment Centre	1-2
4	19 October	@ South East Melbourne Phoenix	L 106-102	Aaron Brooks (23)	LaMelo Ball (7)	Aaron Brooks (5)	Melbourne Arena	1-3
5	21 October	Adelaide 36ers	L 92-98	Aaron Brooks (31)	Ball, Brooks, Froling, Ogilvy (5)	LaMelo Ball (7)	WIN Entertainment Centre	1-4
6	24 October	@ New Zealand Breakers	L 103-72	Aaron Brooks (19)	LaMelo Ball (7)	LaMelo Ball (4)	Spark Arena	1-5
7	27 October	Perth Wildcats	L 76-81	Tim Coenraad (18)	LaMelo Ball (10)	LaMelo Ball (7)	WIN Entertainment Centre	1-6

November: 2–3 (Home: 1–1; Road: 1–2)

Game	Date	Team	Score	High points	High rebounds	High assists	Location Attendance	Record
8	3 November	Brisbane Bullets	L 69-83	LaMelo Ball (19)	LaMelo Ball (9)	LaMelo Ball (5)	AIS Arena	1-7
9	9 November	@ Cairns Taipans	W 91-101	LaMelo Ball (24)	John Boone, Andrew Ogilvy (9)	LaMelo Ball (9)	Cairns Convention Centre	2-7
10	17 November	@ Sydney Kings	L 92-87	Todd Blanchfield (22)	Andrew Ogilvy (13)	LaMelo Ball (6)	Qudos Bank Arena	2-8
11	25 November	Cairns Taipans	W 114-106	LaMelo Ball (32)	LaMelo Ball (11)	LaMelo Ball (13)	WIN Entertainment Centre	3-8
12	30 November	@ New Zealand Breakers	L 91-79	LaMelo Ball (25)	LaMelo Ball (12)	LaMelo Ball (10)	Spark Arena	3-9

December: 2–4 (Home: 1–2; Road: 1–2)

Game	Date	Team	Score	High points	High rebounds	High assists	Location Attendance	Record
13	7 December	@ Brisbane Bullets	L 101-91	Todd Blanchfield, Angus Glover (17)	Andrew Ogilvy (11)	Sunday Dech, Emmett Naar (5)	Nissan Arena	3-10
14	16 December	Melbourne United	L 73-94	Angus Glover (15)	Boone, Hobson, Ogilvy (7)	Darington Hobson, Emmett Naar (5)	WIN Entertainment Centre	3-11
15	20 December	@ Adelaide 36ers	W 84-93	Sunday Dech (18)	Andrew Ogilvy (9)	Emmett Naar (7)	Adelaide Entertainment Centre	4-11
16	22 December	New Zealand Breakers	L 89-91	Todd Blanchfield (19)	Andrew Ogilvy (7)	Emmett Naar (8)	WIN Entertainment Centre	4-12
17	28 December	@ South East Melbourne Phoenix	L 112-102	Todd Blanchfield (22)	Sunday Dech, Andrew Ogilvy (6)	Darington Hobson, Emmett Naar (6)	Melbourne Arena	4-13
18	31 December	Sydney Kings	W 85-80	Josh Boone (21)	Josh Boone (9)	Emmett Naar (8)	WIN Entertainment Centre	5-13

January: 0–7 (Home: 0–4; Road: 0–3)

Game	Date	Team	Score	High points	High rebounds	High assists	Location Attendance	Record
19	4 January	Melbourne United	L 91-104	Tim Coenraad (18)	Josh Boone (13)	Darington Hobson (9)	WIN Entertainment Centre	5-14
20	6 January	@ Adelaide 36ers	L 102-96	Todd Blanchfield (35)	Josh Boone (basketball) (7)	Sunday Dech, Darington Hobson (4)	Adelaide Entertainment Centre	5-15
21	10 January	Perth Wildcats	L 77-99	Todd Blanchfield (26)	Todd Blanchfield (8)	Angus Glover, Emmett Naar (4)	WIN Entertainment Centre	5-16
22	12 January	South East Melbourne Phoenix	L 82-90	Todd Blanchfield (15)	Sam Froling (11)	Darington Hobson, Emmett Naar (3)	WIN Entertainment Centre	5-17
23	18 January	@ Brisbane Bullets	L 106-77	Angus Glover (18)	Josh Boone (7)	Emmett Naar (5)	Nissan Arena	5-18
24	24 January	Sydney Kings	L 79-102	Darington Hobson (13)	Darington Hobson (8)	Darington Hobson (6)	WIN Entertainment Centre	5-19
25	31 January	@ Cairns Taipans	L 99-75	Josh Boone 19	Josh Boone 10	Sunday Dech, Darington Hobson 4	Cairns Convention Centre	5-20

February: 0–3 (Home: 0–1; Road: 0–2)

Game	Date	Team	Score	High points	High rebounds	High assists	Location Attendance	Record
26	2 February	New Zealand Breakers	L 56-65	Josh Boone (14)	Sunday Dech (6)	Emmett Naar (8)	WIN Entertainment Centre	5-21
27	8 February	@ Melbourne United	L 95-72	Andrew Ogilvy (15)	Darington Hobson (7)	Andrew Ogilvy (7)	Melbourne Arena	5-22
28	15 February	@ Sydney Kings	L 98-82	Sunday Dech (26)	Angus Glover (8)	Angus Glover (4)	Qudos Bank Arena	5-23

== Awards ==
=== Player of the Week ===
Round 6, LaMelo Ball

== See also ==
- 2019–20 NBL season
- Illawarra Hawks
