= 2019–20 Sydney Kings season =

Australian basketball club season

- Regular season champions
- Head coach: (United States) Will Weaver
- Captain: (Australia) Kevin Lisch
- Arena: Sydney SuperDome

NBL results
- Record: 20–8 (71.4%)
- Ladder: 1st
- Finals finish: Runners-up (lost to Wildcats 1–2)
- Stats at NBL.com.au

Player records
- Points: (United States) Ware 19.9
- Rebounds: (Australia) Cooks 9.1
- Assists: (United States) Ware 3.9

Uniforms
Home	Away
- All statistics correct as of 21 April 2020.

The 2019–20 NBL season was the 31st season for the Sydney Kings in the NBL.

== Roster ==
2019–20 Sydney Kings roster
Players
Coaches

Pos.	No.	Nat.	Name	Ht.	Wt.
G/F	0	(Brazil)	Louzada, Didi (NS)	1.95 m (6 ft 5 in)	84 kg (185 lb)
C	1	(Australia)	Hunter, Jordan	2.08 m (6 ft 10 in)	104 kg (229 lb)
G	2	(Australia)	Hutchison, Lochlan (DP)
G	4	(United States)	Taylor, Deshon (I)	1.88 m (6 ft 2 in)	84 kg (185 lb)
C	6	(Australia)	Bogut, Andrew	2.13 m (7 ft 0 in)	118 kg (260 lb)
G	7	(Australia)	Bruce, Shaun	1.90 m (6 ft 3 in)	82 kg (181 lb)
G/F	8	(Australia)	Newley, Brad	1.98 m (6 ft 6 in)	94 kg (207 lb)
F	9	(Australia)	Moller, Craig (injured)	2.03 m (6 ft 8 in)	93 kg (205 lb)
F	10	(Australia)	Cooks, Xavier	2.03 m (6 ft 8 in)	84 kg (185 lb)
G	11	(Australia)	Lisch, Kevin (C)	1.88 m (6 ft 2 in)	88 kg (194 lb)
F	12	(Australia)	Walker, Lucas	2.02 m (6 ft 8 in)	102 kg (225 lb)
F/C	14	(Australia)	Kickert, Daniel	2.08 m (6 ft 10 in)	109 kg (240 lb)
G	21	(Australia)	Madden, Hunter (DP)	1.84 m (6 ft 0 in)
G	22	(United States)	Ware, Casper (I)	1.78 m (5 ft 10 in)	79 kg (174 lb)
F	24	(United States)	Tate, Jae'Sean (I)	1.93 m (6 ft 4 in)	104 kg (229 lb)
C	25	(Australia)	Talbot, Banjo (DP)	2.10 m (6 ft 11 in)

Head coach

- (United States) Will Weaver

Assistant coach(es)

- (Australia) Adam Forde
- (Canada) James Duncan
- (Australia) Aleks Marić

Legend

- (C) Team captain
- (DP) Development player
- (I) Import player
- (NS) Next Star player
- Injured

- Roster
Updated: 9 February 2020

=== Depth chart ===
Pos.	Starting 5	Bench 1	Bench 2	Development
C	Andrew Bogut	Daniel Kickert	Jordan Hunter	Banjo Talbot
PF	Jae'Sean Tate	Lucas Walker	Craig Moller
SF	Didi Louzada	Brad Newley
SG	Kevin Lisch	Xavier Cooks		Hunter Madden
PG	Casper Ware	Shaun Bruce	Deshon Taylor	Lochlan Hutchison

== Preseason ==
The Kings' pre-season games consisted of three regular pre-season games and two NBL Blitz games. The first game was against Hills Select, before the Kings travelled to Tasmania to participate in the NBL Blitz during September, with games against the South East Melbourne Phoenix and the Perth Wildcats. They then had games against the New Zealand Breakers and the Illawarra Hawks.

=== Ladder ===
2019–20 NBL pre-season ladder
Ladder
Information

Pos.	Nat.	Name	Pld.	W.	L.	Last 5	Streak	Home	Away	For	Against	Pts %	Win %
1	(Australia)	Sydney	5	4	1	4–1	W3	1–0	3–1	486	394	123.35%	80.00%
2	(Australia)	Cairns	9	6	3	4–1	W4	3–1	3–2	811	763	106.29%	66.67%
3	(Australia)	S.E. Melbourne (NT)	9	6	3	4–1	W2	3–2	3–1	819	784	104.46%	66.67%
4	(Australia)	Melbourne	12	6	6	2–3	L2	4–3	2–3	1167	1095	106.58%	50.00%
5	(Australia)	Brisbane	8	4	4	3–2	W3	1–1	3–3	676	676	100.00%	50.00%
6	(Australia)	Illawarra	6	3	3	2–3	L2	1–1	2–2	598	631	94.77%	50.00%
7	(Australia)	Adelaide	10	4	6	1–4	L2	1–1	3–5	892	920	96.96%	40.00%
8	(Australia)	Perth (RC)	7	2	5	1–4	L1	1–2	1–3	625	671	93.14%	28.57%
9	(New Zealand)	New Zealand	6	1	5	0–5	L5	0–0	1–5	501	574	87.28%	16.67%

Total Rounds
11 weeks

Total Games
46 games

Legend
- (NT) New Team
- (RC) Reigning Champion

- Updated: 17 October 2019

=== Game log ===
2019–20 game log
Pre-Season: 1–0 (Home: 0–0; Road: 1–0)

Game	Date	Team	Score	High points	High rebounds	High assists	Location Attendance	Record
1	14 September	@ Hills Select	W 109-67	Craig Moller (22)	Jordan Hunter, Jae'Sean Tate (8)	Bruce, Lisch, Walker (4)	Hills Basketball Stadium	1-0

NBL Blitz: 1–1 (Home: 0–0; Road: 1–1)

Game	Date	Team	Score	High points	High rebounds	High assists	Location Attendance	Record
1	20 September	South East Melbourne Phoenix	L 87-96	Casper Ware (19)	Jae'Sean Tate (7)	Shaun Bruce (4)	Devonport Recreation & Function Centre	0-1
2	22 September	Perth Wildcats	W 71-103	Didi Louzada (29)	Jordan Hunter (10)	Louzada, Moller, Ware (3)	Derwent Entertainment Centre	1-1

Pre-Season: 2–0 (Home: 1–0; Road: 1–0)

Game	Date	Team	Score	High points	High rebounds	High assists	Location Attendance	Record
2	26 September	New Zealand Breakers	W 81-64	Casper Ware (26)	Andrew Bogut (8)	Kevin Lisch (4)	Sydney Uni Sports & Aquatic Centre	2-0
3	29 September	@ Illawarra Hawks	W 96-106	Didi Louzada (24)	Jordan Hunter (11)	Kevin Lisch, Jae'Sean Tate (4)	WIN Entertainment Centre	3-0

== Regular season ==
=== Standings ===
Pos	2019–20 NBL season											
Pos	Team	Pld	W	L	PCT	Last 5	Streak	Home	Away	PF	PA	PP
1	Sydney Kings	28	20	8	71.43%	4–1	W2	12–2	8–6	2642	2472	106.88%
2	Perth Wildcats	28	19	9	67.86%	4–1	W3	11–3	8–6	2529	2409	104.98%
3	Cairns Taipans	28	16	12	57.14%	3–2	L2	11–3	5–9	2587	2547	101.57%
4	Melbourne United	28	15	13	53.57%	4–1	W3	9–5	6–8	2638	2560	103.05%
5	Brisbane Bullets	28	15	13	53.57%	3–2	W1	10–4	5–9	2607	2557	101.96%
6	New Zealand Breakers	28	15	13	53.57%	4–1	W4	9–5	6–8	2514	2468	101.86%
7	Adelaide 36ers	28	12	16	42.86%	1–4	L2	8–6	4–10	2654	2768	95.88%
8	S.E. Melbourne Phoenix	28	9	19	32.14%	0–5	L8	6–8	3–11	2671	2761	96.74%
9	Illawarra Hawks	28	5	23	17.86%	0–5	L10	3–11	2–12	2354	2654	88.70%

Updated to match(es) played on 16 February 2020. Source: NBL.com.au

=== Ladder progression ===
- Numbers highlighted in green indicate that the team finished the round inside the top four.
- Numbers highlighted in blue indicates the team finished first on the ladder in that round.
- Numbers highlighted in red indicates the team finished last place on the ladder in that round.

2019–20 NBL season
Team	1	2	3	4	5	6	7	8	9	10	11	12	13	14	15	16	17	18	19	20
Adelaide 36ers	–	8	4	4	5	6	6	5	5	6	4	5	5	5	5	7	7	7	7	7
Brisbane Bullets	2	4	5	5	4	5	5	6	7	7	7	7	8	7	6	5	4	4	5	5
Cairns Taipans	7	7	6	6	8	8	7	7	6	4	6	4	4	4	3	3	3	3	3	3
Illawarra Hawks	6	5	7	9	9	9	9	8	9	9	9	9	9	9	9	9	9	9	9	9
Melbourne United	5	6	8	8	6	4	3	3	4	3	3	3	3	3	4	4	5	6	6	4
New Zealand Breakers	–	–	9	7	7	7	8	9	8	8	8	8	7	6	8	6	6	5	4	6
Perth Wildcats	4	2	3	2	2	3	2	2	2	2	2	2	2	2	2	2	2	2	2	2
S.E. Melbourne Phoenix	3	3	2	3	3	2	4	4	3	5	5	6	6	8	7	8	8	8	8	8
Sydney Kings	1	1	1	1	1	1	1	1	1	1	1	1	1	1	1	1	1	1	1	1

=== Game log ===
The regular season of the NBL consisted of 28 games, with the King's 14 home games played at Qudos Bank Arena.

2019–20 game log
October: 4–0 (Home: 2–0; Road: 2–0)

Game	Date	Team	Score	High points	High rebounds	High assists	Location Attendance	Record
1	4 October	@ Cairns Taipans	W 71-79	Casper Ware (23)	Andrew Bogut (12)	Casper Ware, Andrew Bogut (5)	Cairns Convention Centre	1-0
2	12 October	Adelaide 36ers	W 102-80	Brad Newley (18)	Jae'Sean Tate (7)	Shaun Bruce (7)	Qudos Bank Arena	2-0
3	18 October	New Zealand Breakers	W 96-91	Casper Ware (27)	Andrew Bogut (15)	Andrew Bogut, Casper Ware (5)	Qudos Bank Arena	3-0
4	20 October	@ New Zealand Breakers	W 66-76	Casper Ware (17)	Andrew Bogut (16)	Shaun Bruce (3)	Spark Arena	4-0
5	26 October	Brisbane Bullets	W 94-79	Casper Ware (17)	Andrew Bogut (11)	Casper Ware (5)	Qudos Bank Arena	5-0

November: 5–1 (Home: 2–0; Road: 3–1)

Game	Date	Team	Score	High points	High rebounds	High assists	Location Attendance	Record
6	2 November	@ Adelaide 36ers	W 96-98	Andrew Bogut (18)	Andrew Bogut (12)	Jae'Sean Tate (5)	Adelaide Entertainment Centre	6-0
7	4 November	@ Melbourne United	L 107-104	Casper Ware (34)	Andrew Bogut (8)	Shaun Bruce (8)	Melbourne Arena	6-1
8	8 November	@ Brisbane Bullets	W 85-95	Brad Newley (20)	Andrew Bogut (8)	Shaun Bruce (8)	Nissan Arena	7-1
9	10 November	Perth Wildcats	W 104-85	Didi Louzada (28)	Jae'Sean Tate (8)	Shaun Bruce (7)	Qudos Bank Arena	8-1
10	17 November	Illawarra Hawks	W 92-87	Jae'Sean Tate (24)	Andrew Bogut (9)	Casper Ware (6)	Qudos Bank Arena	9-1
11	23 November	@ South East Melbourne Phoenix	W 86-90	Casper Ware (25)	Andrew Bogut (10)	Bogut, Bruce, Ware (4)	Melbourne Arena	10-1

December: 3–5 (Home: 2–2; Road: 1–3)

Game	Date	Team	Score	High points	High rebounds	High assists	Location Attendance	Record
12	1 December	Melbourne United	W 111-101	Casper Ware (27)	Andrew Bogut (8)	Casper Ware (5)	Qudos Bank Arena	11-1
13	6 December	@ Perth Wildcats	L 96-77	Casper Ware (13)	Andrew Bogut (8)	Shaun Bruce (4)	RAC Arena	11-2
14	8 December	Cairns Taipans	L 98-109	Casper Ware (23)	Andrew Bogut (12)	Casper Ware (7)	Qudos Bank Arena	11-3
15	14 December	@ Melbourne United	W 81-104	Casper Ware (27)	Jae'Sean Tate (12)	Shaun Bruce (4)	Melbourne Arena	12-3
16	21 December	@ Brisbane Bullets	L 87-80	Casper Ware (26)	Xavier Cooks (7)	Casper Ware (3)	Nissan Arena	12-4
17	23 December	South East Melbourne Phoenix	W 110-98	Daniel Kickert (18)	Xavier Cooks (9)	Casper Ware (7)	Qudos Bank Arena	13-4
18	28 December	Perth Wildcats	L 85-98	Casper Ware (33)	Andrew Bogut (12)	Shaun Bruce (4)	Qudos Bank Arena	13-5
19	31 December	@ Illawarra Hawks	L 85-80	Jae'Sean Tate (23)	Xavier Cooks (9)	Daniel Kickert (5)	WIN Entertainment Centre	13-6

January: 5–1 (Home: 4–0; Road: 1–1)

Game	Date	Team	Score	High points	High rebounds	High assists	Location Attendance	Record
20	4 January	Adelaide 36ers	W 91-77	Brad Newley, Jae'Sean Tate (20)	Andrew Bogut (10)	Casper Ware (6)	Qudos Bank Arena	14-6
21	11 January	Cairns Taipans	W 92=83	Daniel Kickert (18)	Bogut, Cooks, Tate (8)	Casper Ware (4)	Qudos Bank Arena	15-6
22	17 January	@ New Zealand Breakers	L 86-81	Jae'Sean Tate (22)	Xavier Cooks (10)	Casper Ware (5)	TSB Stadium	15-7
23	19 January	South East Melbourne Phoenix	W 98-81	Didi Louzada (18)	Andrew Bogut (11)	Shaun Bruce, Casper Ware (6)	Qudos Bank Arena	16-7
24	24 January	@ Illawarra Hawks	W 79-102	Jae'Sean Tate, Deshon Taylor (17)	Xavier Cooks (11)	Shaun Bruce (5)	WIN Entertainment Centre	17-7
25	26 January	Melbourne United	W 106-88	Casper Ware (26)	Xavier Cooks (10)	Andrew Bogut (9)	Qudos Bank Arena	18-7

February: 2–1 (Home: 1–0; Road: 1–1)

Game	Date	Team	Score	High points	High rebounds	High assists	Location Attendance	Record
26	1 February	@ Perth Wildcats	L 110-100	Jae'Sean Tate (23)	Jae'Sean Tate (12)	Shaun Bruce (5)	RAC Arena	18-8
27	9 February	@ South East Melbourne Phoenix	W 96-99	Casper Ware (24)	Xavier Cooks (13)	Xavier Cooks, Brad Newley (3)	Melbourne Arena	19-8
28	14 February	Illawarra Hawks	W 98-82	Jae'Sean Tate, Casper Ware (19)	Xavier Cooks (11)	Newley, Taylor, Ware (3)3	Qudos Bank Arena	20-8

== Postseason ==
2020 finals game log
Semifinals: 2–1 (Home: 2–0; Road: 0–1)

Game	Date	Team	Score	High points	High rebounds	High assists	Location Attendance	Record
1	29 February	Melbourne United	W 86-80	Jae'Sean Tate (23)	Andrew Bogut (10)	Casper Ware (5)	Qudos Bank Arena	1-0
2	2 March	@ Melbourne United	L 125-80	Jae'Sean Tate (18)	Xavier Cooks (7)	Didi Louzada (2)	Melbourne Arena	1-1
3	5 March	Melbourne United	W 89-87	Jae'Sean Tate (2)	Xavier Cooks (9)	Kevin Lisch (4)	Qudos Bank Arena	2-1

NBL Finals: 1–2 (Home: 0–2; Road: 1–0)

Game	Date	Team	Score	High points	High rebounds	High assists	Location Attendance	Series
1	8 March	Perth Wildcats	L 86-88	Andrew Bogut (18)	Andrew Bogut (12)	Casper Ware (4)4	Qudos Bank Arena	0-1
2	13 March	@ Perth Wildcats	W 85-97	Jae'Sean Tate (20)	Andrew Bogut (13)	Brad Newley (5)	RAC Arena	1-1
3	15 March	Perth Wildcats	L 96-111	Jae'Sean Tate (20)	Xavier Cooks (9)	Andrew Bogut, Shaun Bruce (3)	Qudos Bank Arena	1-2

== Awards ==
=== Player of the Week ===
Round 3, Andrew Bogut

== See also ==
- 2019–20 NBL season
- Sydney Kings
