= 2019–20 S.E. Melbourne Phoenix season =

- Head coach: (Australia) Simon Mitchell
- Co-captains: (Australia) Mitch Creek (Australia) Adam Gibson
- Arena: Melbourne Arena

NBL results
- Record: 9–19 (32.1%)
- Ladder: 8th
- Finals finish: Did not qualify
- Stats at NBL.com.au

Player records
- Points: two player 20.2
- Rebounds: (Australia) Pineau 8.7
- Assists: (United States) Roberson 5.6

Uniforms
Home	Away
- All statistics correct as of 21 April 2020.

The 2019–20 NBL season was the 1st season for the South East Melbourne Phoenix in the NBL.

== Roster ==
Note: Flags indicate national team eligibility at FIBA-sanctioned events. Players may hold other non-FIBA nationalities not displayed.

2019–20 South East Melbourne Phoenix roster
Players
Coaches

Pos.	No.	Nat.	Name	Ht.	Wt.
G	1	(Australia)	Gibson, Adam (C)	1.88 m (6 ft 2 in)	93 kg (205 lb)
G	3	(United States)	Roberson, John (I)	1.80 m (5 ft 11 in)	78 kg (172 lb)
G	4	(Australia)	Adnam, Kyle	1.86 m (6 ft 1 in)	83 kg (183 lb)
G	6	(Australia)	Hickey, William (DP)	1.94 m (6 ft 4 in)	85 kg (187 lb)
G/F	9	(Australia)	Madgen, Ben	1.93 m (6 ft 4 in)	92 kg (203 lb)
F	11	(United States)	Walker, Devondrick (I)	1.96 m (6 ft 5 in)	93 kg (205 lb)
C	12	(South Sudan)	Acuoth, Deng	2.15 m (7 ft 1 in)	90 kg (198 lb)
F	14	(Australia)	McKay, Geremy (DP)	2.01 m (6 ft 7 in)	107 kg (236 lb)
G	21	(Australia)	Stephens, Kendall	2.01 m (6 ft 7 in)	93 kg (205 lb)
C	22	(Australia)	Pineau, Dane	2.06 m (6 ft 9 in)	102 kg (225 lb)
F	25	(Australia)	Trist, Daniel	2.04 m (6 ft 8 in)	111 kg (245 lb)
G	35	(United States)	Armstrong, Terry (NS)	1.98 m (6 ft 6 in)	84 kg (185 lb)
F	42	(Guam)	Wesley, Tai (I)	2.01 m (6 ft 7 in)	109 kg (240 lb)
G/F	55	(Australia)	Creek, Mitch (injured) (C)	1.96 m (6 ft 5 in)	98 kg (216 lb)

Head coach

- (Australia) Simon Mitchell

Assistant coach(es)

- (Australia) Ian Stacker
- (New Zealand) Judd Flavell

Legend

- (C) Team captain
- (DP) Development player
- (I) Import player
- (NS) Next Star player
- Injured

- Roster
Updated: 14 January 2020

=== Depth chart ===
Pos.	Starting 5	Bench 1	Bench 2	Development
C	Daniel Trist	Deng Acuoth
PF	Tai Wesley	Dane Pineau		Geremy McKay
SF	Mitch Creek	Ben Madgen	Kendall Stephens
SG	Devondrick Walker	Adam Gibson	Terry Armstrong	William Hickey
PG	John Roberson	Kyle Adnam

== Preseason ==
As part of their first season in the NBL, the Phoenix had an extended pre-season. Their first two games were part of a tour of China, before they had five games in Melbourne against another Chinese team and three NBL teams. As a club in the NBL they also took part in the NBL Blitz and played games against the Sydney Kings and the New Zealand Breakers, however they opted out of the NBLxNBA games.

=== Ladder ===
2019–20 NBL pre-season ladder
Ladder
Information

Pos.	Nat.	Name	Pld.	W.	L.	Last 5	Streak	Home	Away	For	Against	Pts %	Win %
1	(Australia)	Sydney	5	4	1	4–1	W3	1–0	3–1	486	394	123.35%	80.00%
2	(Australia)	Cairns	9	6	3	4–1	W4	3–1	3–2	811	763	106.29%	66.67%
3	(Australia)	S.E. Melbourne (NT)	9	6	3	4–1	W2	3–2	3–1	819	784	104.46%	66.67%
4	(Australia)	Melbourne	12	6	6	2–3	L2	4–3	2–3	1167	1095	106.58%	50.00%
5	(Australia)	Brisbane	8	4	4	3–2	W3	1–1	3–3	676	676	100.00%	50.00%
6	(Australia)	Illawarra	6	3	3	2–3	L2	1–1	2–2	598	631	94.77%	50.00%
7	(Australia)	Adelaide	10	4	6	1–4	L2	1–1	3–5	892	920	96.96%	40.00%
8	(Australia)	Perth (RC)	7	2	5	1–4	L1	1–2	1–3	625	671	93.14%	28.57%
9	(New Zealand)	New Zealand	6	1	5	0–5	L5	0–0	1–5	501	574	87.28%	16.67%

Total Rounds
11 weeks

Total Games
46 games

Legend
- (NT) New Team
- (RC) Reigning Champion

- Updated: 17 October 2019

=== Game log ===
2019–20 pre-season game log
China Tour: 1–1 (Home: 0–0; Road: 1–1)

Game	Date	Team	Score	High points	High rebounds	High assists	Location Attendance	Record
1	30 May	@ Jiangsu Dragons	W 73-92	Kyle Adnam (23)	Dane Pineau (8)	Kyle Adnam (5)	Wutaishan Gymnasium	1-0
2	1 June	@ Shanghai Sharks	L 76-71	Kendall Stephens (22)	Not announced	Not announced	Yuanshen Sports Centre Stadium	1-1

Pre-Season: 3–2 (Home: 3–2; Road: 0–0)

Game	Date	Team	Score	High points	High rebounds	High assists	Location Attendance	Record
1	25 August	Zhejiang Lions	W 90-78	Isaac Turner (18)	Dan Trist (9)	Kyle Adnam (4)	State Basketball Centre	1-0
2	4 September	Cairns Taipans	L 102-106	John Roberson (25)	Tai Wesley, Dane Pineau (7)	Tai Wesley (6)	State Basketball Centre	1-1
3	6 September	Brisbane Bullets	W 85-80	Tai Wesley (25)	Tai Wesley (9)	John Roberson (8)	Traralgon Sports Stadium	2-1
4	8 September	Cairns Taipans	W 93-80	Tai Wesley (21)	Keith Benson (11)	Tai Wesley, John Roberson (6)	Kilsyth Basketball Stadium	3-1
5	15 September	Illawarra Hawks	L 98-109	Ben Madgen, John Roberson (18)	Dane Pineau (15)	Tai Wesley (3)	Lauren Jackson Sports Centre	3-2

NBL Blitz: 2–0 (Home: 0–0; Road: 2–0)

Game	Date	Team	Score	High points	High rebounds	High assists	Location Attendance	Record
1	20 September	Sydney Kings	W 96-87	John Roberson (31)	Dane Pineau, Daniel Trist (6)	Kyle Adnam, John Roberson (4)	Devonport Recreation & Function Centre	1-0
2	22 September	New Zealand Breakers	W 102-95	Tai Wesley (23)	Ben Madgen (9)	John Roberson (7)	Derwent Entertainment Centre	2-0

== Regular season ==
The regular season of the NBL consisted of 28 games, with the Phoenix's 14 home games shared between Melbourne Arena and the State Basketball Centre. The Phoenix are also playing in the opening game against their cross-town rivals, Melbourne United, in the NBL Throwdown.

=== Ladder ===
Pos	2019–20 NBL season											
Pos	Team	Pld	W	L	PCT	Last 5	Streak	Home	Away	PF	PA	PP
1	Sydney Kings	28	20	8	71.43%	4–1	W2	12–2	8–6	2642	2472	106.88%
2	Perth Wildcats	28	19	9	67.86%	4–1	W3	11–3	8–6	2529	2409	104.98%
3	Cairns Taipans	28	16	12	57.14%	3–2	L2	11–3	5–9	2587	2547	101.57%
4	Melbourne United	28	15	13	53.57%	4–1	W3	9–5	6–8	2638	2560	103.05%
5	Brisbane Bullets	28	15	13	53.57%	3–2	W1	10–4	5–9	2607	2557	101.96%
6	New Zealand Breakers	28	15	13	53.57%	4–1	W4	9–5	6–8	2514	2468	101.86%
7	Adelaide 36ers	28	12	16	42.86%	1–4	L2	8–6	4–10	2654	2768	95.88%
8	S.E. Melbourne Phoenix	28	9	19	32.14%	0–5	L8	6–8	3–11	2671	2761	96.74%
9	Illawarra Hawks	28	5	23	17.86%	0–5	L10	3–11	2–12	2354	2654	88.70%

Updated to match(es) played on 16 February 2020. Source: NBL.com.au

=== Ladder progression ===
- Numbers highlighted in green indicate that the team finished the round inside the top four.
- Numbers highlighted in blue indicates the team finished first on the ladder in that round.
- Numbers highlighted in red indicates the team finished last place on the ladder in that round.

2019–20 NBL season
Team	1	2	3	4	5	6	7	8	9	10	11	12	13	14	15	16	17	18	19	20
Adelaide 36ers	–	8	4	4	5	6	6	5	5	6	4	5	5	5	5	7	7	7	7	7
Brisbane Bullets	2	4	5	5	4	5	5	6	7	7	7	7	8	7	6	5	4	4	5	5
Cairns Taipans	7	7	6	6	8	8	7	7	6	4	6	4	4	4	3	3	3	3	3	3
Illawarra Hawks	6	5	7	9	9	9	9	8	9	9	9	9	9	9	9	9	9	9	9	9
Melbourne United	5	6	8	8	6	4	3	3	4	3	3	3	3	3	4	4	5	6	6	4
New Zealand Breakers	–	–	9	7	7	7	8	9	8	8	8	8	7	6	8	6	6	5	4	6
Perth Wildcats	4	2	3	2	2	3	2	2	2	2	2	2	2	2	2	2	2	2	2	2
S.E. Melbourne Phoenix	3	3	2	3	3	2	4	4	3	5	5	6	6	8	7	8	8	8	8	8
Sydney Kings	1	1	1	1	1	1	1	1	1	1	1	1	1	1	1	1	1	1	1	1

=== Game log ===
2019–20 game log
October: 4–1 (Home: 3–0; Road: 1–1)

Game	Date	Team	Score	High points	High rebounds	High assists	Location Attendance	Record
1	3 October	@ Melbourne United	W 88-91	Mitch Creek (28)	Mitch Creek (11)	Creek, Trist, Roberson (3)	Melbourne Arena	1-0
2	13 October	Brisbane Bullets	W 113-93	John Roberson (30)	Ben Madgen (8)	Mitch Creek (7)	Melbourne Arena	2-0
3	19 October	Illawarra Hawks	W 106-102	John Roberson (26)	Dane Pineau (10)	John Roberson (1)	Melbourne Arena	3-0
4	25 October	@ Perth Wildcats	L 110-79	Jaye Crockett (12)	Dane Pineau (8)	Ben Madgen (5)	RAC Arena	3-1
5	27 October	Adelaide 36ers	W 101-91	John Roberson (24)	Dane Pineau (8)	John Roberson (7)	Melbourne Arena	4-1

November: 2–4 (Home: 1–3; Road: 1–1)

Game	Date	Team	Score	High points	High rebounds	High assists	Location Attendance	Record
6	2 November	Melbourne United	L 98-110	Mitch Creek (23)	Mitch Creek, Jaye Crockett (7)	Mitch Creek (7)	Melbourne Arena	4-2
7	9 November	New Zealand Breakers	W 103-78	Mitch Creek 21	Mitch Creek 11	John Roberson 9	Melbourne Arena	5-2
8	16 November	@ Melbourne United	L 96-95	Mitch Creek (27)	Keith Benson (8)	John Roberson (6)	Melbourne Arena	5-3
9	18 November	Adelaide 36ers	L 91-103	Mitch Creek (22)	Mitch Creek (11)	John Roberson (6)	Melbourne Arena	5-4
10	23 November	Sydney Kings	L 86-90	John Roberson (25)	Dane Pineau (12)	John Roberson (6)	Melbourne Arena	5-5
11	30 November	@ Brisbane Bullets	W 95-110	Ben Madgen (23)	Dane Pineau (9)	John Roberson (6)	Nissan Arena	6-5

December: 2–5 (Home: 2–1; Road: 0–4)

Game	Date	Team	Score	High points	High rebounds	High assists	Location Attendance	Record
12	8 December	Perth Wildcats	L 98-108	Mitch Creek (31)	Ben Madgen (11)	Gibson, Roberson, Wesley (4)	Melbourne Arena	6-6
13	13 December	@ Adelaide 36ers	L 113-111	Mitch Creek (27)	Mitch Creek (11)	Mitch Creek, John Roberson (4)	Adelaide Entertainment Centre	6-7
14	15 December	Cairns Taipans	W 112-105	John Roberson (32)	Mitch Creek, Dane Pineau (9)	Tai Wesley (6)	Melbourne Arena	7-7
15	20 December	@ New Zealand Breakers	L 90-84	Mitch Creek (24)	Dane Pineau (9)	John Roberson (7)	Horncastle Arena	7-8
16	23 December	@ Sydney Kings	L 110-98	John Roberson (25)	Mitch Creek (12)	Kyle Adnam, John Roberson (5)	RAC Arena	7-9
17	28 December	Illawarra Hawks	W 112-102	John Roberson (28)	Tai Wesley (7)	John Roberson, Tai Wesley (5)	Melbourne Arena	8-9
18	31 December	@ Cairns Taipans	L 92-84	John Roberson (19)	Dane Pineau (9)	Mitch Creek, John Roberson (5)	Cairns Convention Centre	8-10

January: 1–4 (Home: 0–2; Road: 1–2)

Game	Date	Team	Score	High points	High rebounds	High assists	Location Attendance	Record
19	5 January	New Zealand Breakers	L 92-97	John Roberson (31)	Dane Pineau (19)	John Roberson, Tai Wesley (6)	State Basketball Centre	8-11
20	12 January	@ Illawarra Hawks	W 82-90	Kendall Stephens (20)	Dane Pineau (18)	John Roberson (7)	WIN Entertainment Centre	9-11
21	17 January	@ Perth Wildcats	L 97-71	Devondrick Walker (16)	Dane Pineau (8)	John Roberson (6)	RAC Arena	9-12
22	19 January	@ Sydney Kings	L 98-81	John Roberson (27)	Dane Pineau (13)	John Roberson (4)	Qudos Bank Arena	9-13
23	23 January	@ Brisbane Bullets	L 108-101	John Roberson (26)	Mitch Creek, Dane Pineau (10)	Kyle Adnam (7)	Nissan Arena	9-14
24	26 January	Cairns Taipans	L 102-103	Mitch Creek (32)	Mitch Creek (10)	John Roberson (7)	State Basketball Centre	9-15

February: 0–4 (Home: 0–2; Road: 0–2)

Game	Date	Team	Score	High points	High rebounds	High assists	Location Attendance	Record
25	2 February	@ Adelaide 36ers	L 100-93	Mitch Creek (27)	Dane Pineau (11)	Mitch Creek (5)	Adelaide Entertainment Centre	9-16
26	9 February	Sydney Kings	L 96-99	Kyle Adnam, John Roberson (19)	Dane Pineau (13)	John Roberson (6)	Melbourne Arena	9-17
27	14 February	@ New Zealand Breakers	L 92-83	John Roberson (15)	Dane Pineau (7)	John Roberson (8)	Horncastle Arena	9-18
28	16 February	Melbourne United	L 90-109	Ben Madgen (23)	Tai Wesley (6)	Kyle Adnam (7)	Melbourne Arena	9-19

== Awards ==
=== Player of the Week ===
Round 1, Mitch Creek

Round 11, John Roberson

Round 14, John Roberson

== See also ==
- 2019–20 NBL season
- South East Melbourne Phoenix
