= 2019–20 Adelaide 36ers season =

National Basketball League team season

- Head coach: (United States) Joey Wright
- Co-captains: (Australia) Brendan Teys (Australia) Kevin White
- Arena: Adelaide Entertainment Centre

NBL results
- Record: 12–16 (42.9%)
- Ladder: 7th
- Finals finish: Did not qualify
- Stats at NBL.com.au

Player records
- Points: (United States) Randle 19.8
- Rebounds: (Australia) Johnson 8.3
- Assists: (United States) Randle 4.5

Uniforms
Home	Away
City
- All statistics correct as of 21 April 2020.

The 2019–20 NBL season was the 39th season for the Adelaide 36ers in the NBL.

== Roster ==
2019–20 Adelaide 36ers roster
Players
Coaches

Pos.	No.	Nat.	Name	Ht.	Wt.
F	1	(Australia)	Kyei, Obi	2.06 m (6 ft 9 in)	86 kg (190 lb)
G	3	(Australia)	White, Kevin (C)	1.89 m (6 ft 2 in)	90 kg (198 lb)
G	6	(Australia)	Mudronja, Alex (DP)	1.96 m (6 ft 5 in)	88 kg (194 lb)
G/F	7	(Australia)	Teys, Brendan (C)	1.88 m (6 ft 2 in)	82 kg (181 lb)
F	9	(Australia)	McVeigh, Jack	2.03 m (6 ft 8 in)	95 kg (209 lb)
G	10	(United States)	Moore, Ramone (injured) (I)	1.93 m (6 ft 4 in)	86 kg (190 lb)
C	11	(Australia)	Froling, Harry	2.11 m (6 ft 11 in)	113 kg (249 lb)
G/F	12	(Australia)	Dillon, Daniel	1.93 m (6 ft 4 in)	91 kg (201 lb)
G	13	(Australia)	Ayre, Ben (DP)	1.88 m (6 ft 2 in)	79 kg (174 lb)
F	17	(United States)	Griffin, Eric (I)	2.03 m (6 ft 8 in)	93 kg (205 lb)
F/C	21	(Australia)	Johnson, Daniel	2.12 m (6 ft 11 in)	108 kg (238 lb)
G/F	22	(Australia)	Drmic, Anthony	1.98 m (6 ft 6 in)	92 kg (203 lb)
G	23	(United States)	Johnson, Bijan (DP)	1.85 m (6 ft 1 in)	83 kg (183 lb)
G	24	(United States)	Randle, Jerome (I)	1.75 m (5 ft 9 in)	79 kg (174 lb)
G	30	(Australia)	Harris, Michael (DP)	1.93 m (6 ft 4 in)

Head coach

- (United States) Joey Wright

Assistant coach(es)

- (United States) Kevin Brooks
- (Australia) Darren Golley
- (Australia) Andrew Jantke

Legend

- (C) Team captain
- (DP) Development player
- (I) Import player
- (TP) Training player
- (NS) Next Star player
- Injured

- Roster
Updated: 10 January 2020

=== Depth chart ===
Pos.	Starting 5	Bench 1	Bench 2	Development
C	Daniel Johnson	Harry Froling
PF	Obi Kyei	Eric Griffin		Michael Harris
SF	Anthony Drmic	Jack McVeigh
SG	Brendan Teys	Ramone Moore		Bijan Johnson
PG	Jerome Randle	Kevin White	Daniel Dillon	Ben Ayre; Alex Mudronja

== Preseason ==
The 36ers pre-season included 7 regular pre-season games, 2 NBL Blitz games and 1 NBLxNBA games. Their first two games were part of a tour of Philippines, before they had three games in Perth against the Perth Wildcats. As a club in the NBL they also took part in the NBL Blitz and played games against the Brisbane Bullets and the Cairns Taipans, which was followed by another 2 pre-season games in Adelaide against the New Zealand Breakers and Melbourne United. They finished their pre-season with a game against the Utah Jazz after the first regular season game of the 2019–20 NBL season.

=== Ladder ===
2019–20 NBL pre-season ladder
Ladder
Information

Pos.	Nat.	Name	Pld.	W.	L.	Last 5	Streak	Home	Away	For	Against	Pts %	Win %
1	(Australia)	Sydney	5	4	1	4–1	W3	1–0	3–1	486	394	123.35%	80.00%
2	(Australia)	Cairns	9	6	3	4–1	W4	3–1	3–2	811	763	106.29%	66.67%
3	(Australia)	S.E. Melbourne (NT)	9	6	3	4–1	W2	3–2	3–1	819	784	104.46%	66.67%
4	(Australia)	Melbourne	12	6	6	2–3	L2	4–3	2–3	1167	1095	106.58%	50.00%
5	(Australia)	Brisbane	8	4	4	3–2	W3	1–1	3–3	676	676	100.00%	50.00%
6	(Australia)	Illawarra	6	3	3	2–3	L2	1–1	2–2	598	631	94.77%	50.00%
7	(Australia)	Adelaide	10	4	6	1–4	L2	1–1	3–5	892	920	96.96%	40.00%
8	(Australia)	Perth (RC)	7	2	5	1–4	L1	1–2	1–3	625	671	93.14%	28.57%
9	(New Zealand)	New Zealand	6	1	5	0–5	L5	0–0	1–5	501	574	87.28%	16.67%

Total Rounds
11 weeks

Total Games
46 games

Legend
- (NT) New Team
- (RC) Reigning Champion

- Updated: 17 October 2019

=== Game log ===
2019–20 pre-season game log
Philippines Tour: 1–1 (Home: 0–0; Road: 1–1)

Game	Date	Team	Score	High points	High rebounds	High assists	Location Attendance	Record
1	23 August	@ Philippines	L 92-83	Ramone Moore (16)	Harry Froling (7)	Daniel Dillon (5)	Meralco Gym	0-1
2	25 August	@ Philippines	W 75-85	Daniel Johnson (16)	Harry Froling (9)	Daniel Johnson (4)	Meralco Gym	1-1

Perth Tour: 2–1 (Home: 0–0; Road: 2–1)

Game	Date	Team	Score	High points	High rebounds	High assists	Location Attendance	Record
3	4 September	@ Perth Wildcats	W 84-90	Deshon Taylor (20)	Harry Froling (5)	Ramone Moore (6)	Mandurah Aquatic & Recreation Centre	2-1
4	6 September	@ Perth Wildcats	L 100-98	Harry Froling (27)	Harry Froling (10)	Daniel Dillon (5)	South West Sports Centre	2-2
5	8 September	@ Perth Wildcats	W 77-83	Jack McVeigh (18)	Harry Froling (8)	Harry Froling (6)	HBF Arena	3-2

NBL Blitz : 0–2 (Home: 0–0; Road: 0–2)

Game	Date	Team	Score	High points	High rebounds	High assists	Location Attendance	Record
1	19 September	Cairns Taipans	L 100-99	Daniel Johnson (27)	Harry Froling (7)	Deshon Taylor (4)	Ulverstone Sports & Leisure Centre	0-1
2	21 September	Brisbane Bullets	L 85-92	Deshon Taylor (23)	Anthony Drmic (5)	Ramone Moore (6)	Silverdome	0-2

Pre-Season : 1–1 (Home: 1–1; Road: 0–0)

Game	Date	Team	Score	High points	High rebounds	High assists	Location Attendance	Record
6	24 September	New Zealand Breakers	W 93-67	Eric Griffin (18)	Harry Froling (10)	Anthony Drmic (4)	Titanium Security Arena	4-2
7	27 September	Melbourne United	L 91-100	Eric Griffin (16)	Obi Kyei, Eric Griffin (6)	Ramone Moore (9)	Adelaide Entertainment Centre	4-3

NBLxNBA : 0–1 (Home: 0–0; Road: 0–1)

Game	Date	Team	Score	High points	High rebounds	High assists	Location Attendance	Record
1	5 October	@ Utah Jazz	L 133-81	Jerome Randle (18)	Harry Froling (11)	Daniel Dillon (4)	Vivint Smart Home Arena	4-4

== Regular season ==
The regular season of the NBL consisted of 28 games, with the 36ers' 14 home games played at the Adelaide Entertainment Centre after leaving Titanium Security Arena during the off-season.

=== Ladder ===
Pos	2019–20 NBL season											
Pos	Team	Pld	W	L	PCT	Last 5	Streak	Home	Away	PF	PA	PP
1	Sydney Kings	28	20	8	71.43%	4–1	W2	12–2	8–6	2642	2472	106.88%
2	Perth Wildcats	28	19	9	67.86%	4–1	W3	11–3	8–6	2529	2409	104.98%
3	Cairns Taipans	28	16	12	57.14%	3–2	L2	11–3	5–9	2587	2547	101.57%
4	Melbourne United	28	15	13	53.57%	4–1	W3	9–5	6–8	2638	2560	103.05%
5	Brisbane Bullets	28	15	13	53.57%	3–2	W1	10–4	5–9	2607	2557	101.96%
6	New Zealand Breakers	28	15	13	53.57%	4–1	W4	9–5	6–8	2514	2468	101.86%
7	Adelaide 36ers	28	12	16	42.86%	1–4	L2	8–6	4–10	2654	2768	95.88%
8	S.E. Melbourne Phoenix	28	9	19	32.14%	0–5	L8	6–8	3–11	2671	2761	96.74%
9	Illawarra Hawks	28	5	23	17.86%	0–5	L10	3–11	2–12	2354	2654	88.70%

Updated to match(es) played on 16 February 2020. Source: NBL.com.au

=== Ladder progression ===
- Numbers highlighted in green indicate that the team finished the round inside the top four.
- Numbers highlighted in blue indicates the team finished first on the ladder in that round.
- Numbers highlighted in red indicates the team finished last place on the ladder in that round.

2019–20 NBL season
Team	1	2	3	4	5	6	7	8	9	10	11	12	13	14	15	16	17	18	19	20
Adelaide 36ers	–	8	4	4	5	6	6	5	5	6	4	5	5	5	5	7	7	7	7	7
Brisbane Bullets	2	4	5	5	4	5	5	6	7	7	7	7	8	7	6	5	4	4	5	5
Cairns Taipans	7	7	6	6	8	8	7	7	6	4	6	4	4	4	3	3	3	3	3	3
Illawarra Hawks	6	5	7	9	9	9	9	8	9	9	9	9	9	9	9	9	9	9	9	9
Melbourne United	5	6	8	8	6	4	3	3	4	3	3	3	3	3	4	4	5	6	6	4
New Zealand Breakers	–	–	9	7	7	7	8	9	8	8	8	8	7	6	8	6	6	5	4	6
Perth Wildcats	4	2	3	2	2	3	2	2	2	2	2	2	2	2	2	2	2	2	2	2
S.E. Melbourne Phoenix	3	3	2	3	3	2	4	4	3	5	5	6	6	8	7	8	8	8	8	8
Sydney Kings	1	1	1	1	1	1	1	1	1	1	1	1	1	1	1	1	1	1	1	1

=== Game log ===
2019–20 game log
October: 3–2 (Home: 2–0; Road: 1–2)

Game	Date	Team	Score	High points	High rebounds	High assists	Location Attendance	Record
1	12 October	@ Sydney Kings	L 102-80	Daniel Johnson (26)	Harry Froling, Obi Kyei (7)	Jerome Randle (5)	Qudos Bank Arena	0-1
2	19 October	Brisbane Bullets	W 104-98	Eric Griffin (22)	Daniel Johnson (7)	Jerome Randle (5)	Adelaide Entertainment Centre	1-1
3	21 October	@ Illawarra Hawks	W 92-98	Daniel Johnson (21)	Daniel Johnson (10)	Anthony Drmic, Ramone Moore (4)	WIN Entertainment Centre	2-1
4	25 October	Cairns Taipans	W 101-97	Jerome Randle (22)	Obiri Kyei (9)	Anthony Drmic (3)	Adelaide Entertainment Centre	3-1
5	27 October	@ South East Melbourne Phoenix	L 101-91	Daniel Johnson (20)	Daniel Johnson (13)	Jerome Randle (4)	Melbourne Arena	3-2

November: 2–4 (Home: 1–2; Road: 1–2)

Game	Date	Team	Score	High points	High rebounds	High assists	Location Attendance	Record
6	2 November	Sydney Kings	L 96-98	Jerome Randle (23)	Anthony Drmic (15)	Jerome Randle (4)	Adelaide Entertainment Centre	3-3
7	10 November	@ Melbourne United	L 109-90	Jerome Randle (17)	Daniel Johnson (4)	Moore, Randle, White (3)	Melbourne Arena	3-4
8	15 November	Perth Wildcats	L 95-99	Daniel Johnson, Jerome Randle (23)	Daniel Johnson (13)	Jerome Randle (6)	Adelaide Entertainment Centre	3-5
9	18 November	@ South East Melbourne Phoenix	W 91-103	Jerome Randle (27)	Anthony Drmic (8)	Eric Griffin (5)	Melbourne Arena	4-5
10	22 November	@ Brisbane Bullets	L 106-104	Anthony Drmic, Jerome Randle (25)	Eric Griffin (8)	Anthony Drmic (6)	Nissan Arena	4-6
11	24 November	New Zealand Breakers	W 117-100	Eric Griffin (24)	Daniel Johnson (11)	Ramone Moore (4)	Adelaide Entertainment Centre	5-6

December: 3–4 (Home: 1–2; Road: 2–2)

Game	Date	Team	Score	High points	High rebounds	High assists	Location Attendance	Record
12	1 December	@ Perth Wildcats	W 88-99	Daniel Johnson (29)	Daniel Johnson (17)	Jerome Randle (8)	RAC Arena	6-6
13	7 December	@ Melbourne United	L 112-90	Eric Griffin (34)	Eric Griffin (9)	Froling, Griffin, Johnson, Randle (2)	Melbourne Arena	6-7
14	13 December	South East Melbourne Phoenix	W 113-111	Jerome Randle (26)	Eric Griffin (10)	Jerome Randle (8)	Adelaide Entertainment Centre	7-7
15	15 December	@ New Zealand Breakers	W 96-99	Jerome Randle (29)	Eric Griffin (8)	Jerome Randle (4)	Spark Arena	8-7
16	20 December	Illawarra Hawks	L 84-93	Jerome Randle (26)	Eric Griffin (10)	Jerome Randle (6)	Adelaide Entertainment Centre	8-8
17	22 December	@ Cairns Taipans	L 94-86	Jerome Randle (19)	Eric Griffin (11)	Jerome Randle (7)	Cairns Convention Centre	8-9
18	29 December	New Zealand Breakers	L 87-96	Jerome Randle (28)	Daniel Johnson (10)	Jerome Randle, Brendan Teys (4)	Adelaide Entertainment Centre	8-10

January: 3–4 (Home: 3–1; Road: 0–3)

Game	Date	Team	Score	High points	High rebounds	High assists	Location Attendance	Record
19	1 January	Perth Wildcats	W 100-97	Eric Griffin (24)	Daniel Johnson (7)	Daniel Johnson (6)	Adelaide Entertainment Centre	9-10
20	4 January	@ Sydney Kings	L 91-77	Jerome Randle (24)	Daniel Johnson (11)	Jerome Randle (6)	Qudos Bank Arena	9-11
21	6 January	Illawarra Hawks	W 102-96	Anthony Drmic (24)	Eric Griffin (9)	Brendan Teys (5)	Adelaide Entertainment Centre	10-11
22	11 January	Melbourne United	W 100-86	Jerome Randle (23)	Eric Griffin (11)	Anthony Drmic, Brendan Teys (4)	Adelaide Entertainment Centre	11-11
23	18 January	@ Cairns Taipans	L 108-91	Daniel Johnson (38)	Jerome Randle (9)	Jerome Randle (10)	Cairns Convention Centre	11-12
24	25 January	Brisbane Bullets	L 99-108	Eric Griffin, Jerome Randle (21)	Daniel Johnson (10)	Daniel Dillon, Jerome Randle (5)	Adelaide Entertainment Centre	11-13
25	31 January	@ New Zealand Breakers	L 113-89	Daniel Johnson (24)	Daniel Johnson (9)	Jerome Randle (6)	Spark Arena	11-14

February: 1–2 (Home: 1–1; Road: 0–1)

Game	Date	Team	Score	High points	High rebounds	High assists	Location Attendance	Record
26	2 February	South East Melbourne Phoenix	W 100-93	Jerome Randle (35)	Anthony Drmic (10)	Brendan Teys (6)	Adelaide Entertainment Centre	12-14
27	8 February	Cairns Taipans	L 80-99	Daniel Johnson (14)	Eric Griffin (9)	Daniel Johnson, Jerome Randle (5)	Adelaide Entertainment Centre	12-15
28	15 February	@ Perth Wildcats	L 94-79	Daniel Johnson (18)	Daniel Johnson (11)	Harry Froling (5)	RAC Arena	12-16

== Awards ==
=== Player of the Week ===
Round 7, Jerome Randle

Round 11, Jerome Randle

== See also ==
- 2019–20 NBL season
- Adelaide 36ers
