= Tim Coenraad =

Australian basketball player

Personal information
- Born: 5 June 1985 (age 41) Brisbane, Queensland
- Listed height: 200 cm (6 ft 7 in)
- Listed weight: 103 kg (227 lb)

Career information
- College: Nova Southeastern (2005–2009)
- Playing career: 2004–2023
- Position: Small forward

Career history
- 2004–2005: Southern Districts Spartans
- 2009: Northside Wizards
- 2009–2023: Wollongong / Illawarra Hawks
- 2010–2011: Mackay Meteors
- 2012: Ballarat Miners
- 2015: Brisbane Spartans
- 2016: Canberra Gunners
- 2017: Ballarat Miners
- 2018: Mount Gambier Pioneers
- 2018: Brisbane Capitals
- 2021–2022: Illawarra Hawks (NBL1)

Career highlights
- 2× QBL champion (2005, 2011); QBL All-League Team (2004); QBL Youth Player of the Year (2004); First-team All-SSC (2009); 2× Second-team All-SSC (2006, 2008); SSC Freshman of the Year (2006); SSC All-Freshman Team (2006)

Tim Coenraad (born 5 June 1985) is an Australian former professional basketball player. He played college basketball for the Nova Southeastern Sharks before playing 14 seasons in the National Basketball League (NBL) with the Illawarra Hawks. He helped the Hawks reach grand finals in 2010 and 2017 and won Club MVP in 2015.

== Early life and career ==
Coenraad was born in Brisbane, Queensland.

In 2004 and 2005, Coenraad played in the Queensland Basketball League (QBL) for the Southern Districts Spartans. He was named QBL Youth Player of the Year and All-League Team in 2004.

== College career ==
Coenraad played college basketball in the United States for the Nova Southeastern Sharks between 2005 and 2009. He was named SSC Freshman of the Year in 2006 and first-team All-SSC in 2009. He finished as the Sharks' all-time leader in games played, fourth in points and assists, fifth in rebounds, second in field-goals made, first in three-pointers made and third in free-throws made.

== Professional career ==
=== Wollongong / Illawarra Hawks (2009–2023) ===
Coenraad signed with the Wollongong Hawks for the 2009–10 NBL season and made his debut on 25 September 2009. He was a member of the Hawks' grand final team in 2010 that lost to the Perth Wildcats.

Coenraad was thrust into a starting role in the 2013–14 NBL season after the retirement of club legend Glen Saville.

In what was his sixth season in 2014–15, Coenraad earned the Club MVP award.

Coenraad signed one-year deals in 2015, 2016, and 2017. In the 2016–17 NBL season, Coenraad and the Hawks once again lost in the grand final series to the Perth Wildcats.

Coenraad signed a two-year deal in 2018, and in December 2019, he became the third player in Hawks history to reach 300 NBL games.

After initially retiring in November 2020, Coenraad returned to the Hawks in May 2021 to play out the 2020–21 NBL season as an injury replacement for Cameron Bairstow.

Coenraad initially re-joined the Hawks for the 2021–22 NBL season as an injury replacement player but was soon elevated to a fully contracted roster position. He played his 350th NBL game in May 2022.

Coenraad again started the 2022–23 NBL season as an injury replacement player, going on to play out what would be his final season, ending his career with 374 games.

=== Off-season stints ===
Coenraad had many stints in Australian state leagues during NBL off-seasons. He played for the Northside Wizards (2009), Mackay Meteors (2010–11), Ballarat Miners (2012; 2017), Brisbane Spartans (2015), Canberra Gunners (2016), Mount Gambier Pioneers (2018), Brisbane Capitals (2018), and the Illawarra Hawks NBL1 team (2021–22).

== National team career ==
In 2019, Coenraad made his debut for the Australian Boomers at the FIBA World Cup qualifiers and won gold with the Australian 3x3 national team at the FIBA 3x3 Asia Cup.

== Personal life ==
Coenraad and his American wife Nelly met while they were in college. The couple have two children.
