= E. J. Singler =

American basketball player (born 1990)

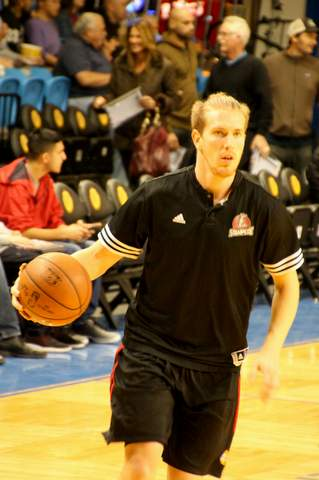
- Singler with the Idaho Stampede in 2016

Personal information
- Born: June 6, 1990 (age 36) Medford, Oregon, U.S.
- Listed height: 6 ft 6 in (1.98 m)
- Listed weight: 215 lb (98 kg)

Career information
- High school: South Medford (Medford, Oregon)
- College: Oregon (2009–2013)
- NBA draft: 2013: undrafted
- Playing career: 2013–2021
- Position: Small forward

Career history
- 2013–2014: Idaho Stampede
- 2014–2015: BC Kalev
- 2015–2016: Idaho Stampede
- 2016–2017: Raptors 905
- 2017–2018: s.Oliver Würzburg
- 2018–2019: Panionios
- 2019: Hawke's Bay Hawks
- 2019–2020: Brisbane Bullets
- 2021: Canterbury Rams

Career highlights
- NZNBL All-Star Five (2019); NBA D-League champion (2017); NBA D-League Three-Point Contest champion (2014); First-team All-Pac-12 (2013); Second-team All-Pac-12 (2012)
- Stats at Basketball Reference

Edward J. Singler (born June 6, 1990) is an American former professional basketball player. He played college basketball for the University of Oregon. As a senior at Oregon, he was named to the All-Pac-12 first team.

== High school career ==
Singler attended South Medford High School, where he was the 2009 OSAA 6A State Player of the Year after averaging 21.8 points, 10.8 rebounds, 5.0 assists, 1.4 blocks and 1.0 steals per game as a senior, helping the Panthers to a 21–8 record and a sixth-place finish at the OSAA Class 6A tournament. He also was named the 2009 Gatorade Oregon Boys Basketball Player of the Year and the Southwest Conference Player of the Year.

== College career ==
In his senior year with the Oregon Ducks, Singler averaged 11.7 points, 4.9 rebounds, and 2.8 assists in 31 minutes per game as the Ducks advanced to the Sweet 16 of the NCAA Tournament.

== Professional career ==
=== 2013–14 season ===
After going undrafted in the 2013 NBA draft, Singler joined the Detroit Pistons for the 2013 NBA Summer League. On September 4, 2013, he signed with the Portland Trail Blazers. However, he was later waived by the Trail Blazers on October 22 after appearing in two preseason games. In November 2013, he was acquired by the Idaho Stampede of the NBA Development League.

=== 2014–15 season ===
On September 8, 2014, Singler signed with Estonian club BC Kalev/Cramo for the 2014–15 season. He appeared in 60 games for the club, averaging 6.9 points and 3.4 rebounds per game.

=== 2015–16 season ===
On October 21, 2015, Singler signed with the Utah Jazz, but was waived the next day. On November 1, he returned to the Idaho Stampede. On November 13, he made his season debut for Idaho in a 110–106 loss to the Rio Grande Valley Vipers, recording 20 points, five rebounds, two assists and three steals in 36 minutes. On March 4, 2016, he was traded to Raptors 905 in exchange for a 2016 second-round draft pick. On March 11, he made his debut for Raptors 905 in a 102–98 win over the Iowa Energy, recording 12 points, two rebounds and three assists in 27 minutes off the bench.

=== 2016–17 season ===
In July 2016, Singler joined the Toronto Raptors for the 2016 NBA Summer League. On September 8, 2016, he signed with Toronto, but was waived on October 22 after appearing in four preseason games. On October 30, 2016, he was reacquired by Raptors 905.

=== 2017–18 season ===
On November 27, 2017, Singler signed with German club s.Oliver Würzburg for the rest of the 2017–18 BBL season.

=== 2018–19 season ===
On September 12, 2018, Singler signed with the Greek team Panionios. He parted ways with the team in January 2019. In April 2019, he joined the Hawke's Bay Hawks for the 2019 New Zealand NBL season.

=== 2019–20 season ===
On July 26, 2019, Singler signed with the Brisbane Bullets in Australia for the 2019–20 NBL season. He appeared in all 28 games for the Bullets, averaging 8.0 points, 4.2 rebounds and 1.8 assists per game.

=== 2020–21 season ===
Singler had signed with the Canterbury Rams in February 2020 for the New Zealand NBL season, but was unable to join the team due to the COVID-19 pandemic. He re-signed with the Rams a year later for the 2021 season. On June 13, 2021, he scored 41 points on 16-of-16 shooting to go with seven rebounds, nine assists and three steals in a 103–85 win over the Taranaki Mountainairs.

== Personal life ==
Singler's father, Ed, played quarterback at Oregon State between 1978 and 1982, while his mother, Kris, played basketball also at Oregon State between 1973 and 1976. His older brother, Kyle, is also a professional basketball player.
