= 2019–20 Cairns Taipans season =

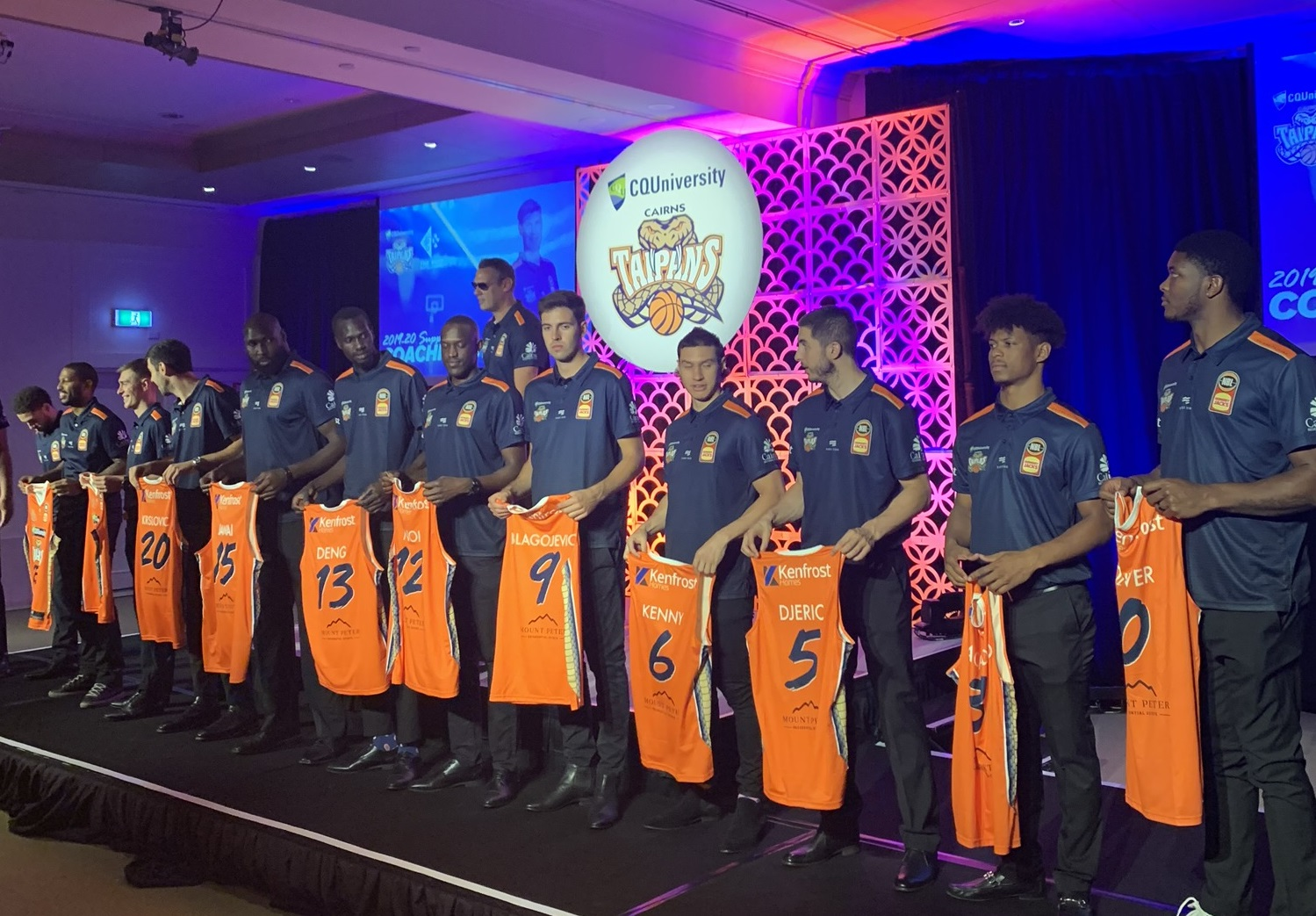
- Head coach: (United States) Mike Kelly
- Co-captains: (Australia) Nathan Jawai (United States) D.J. Newbill
- Arena: Cairns Convention Centre

NBL results
- Record: 16–12 (57.1%)
- Ladder: 3rd
- Finals finish: Semifinalist (lost to Wildcats 1–2)
- Biggest win: 24 points 99–75 (Hawks)
- Biggest defeat: 36 points 124–88 (@ Brisbane)
- Stats at NBL.com.au

Home Attendance
- Highest attendance: 5,188 (1 March 2020)
- Lowest attendance: 3,904 (29 November 2019)
- Total attendance: 67,105
- Average attendance: 4,473

Player records
- Points: (United States) Newbill 18.5
- Rebounds: (United States) Oliver 9.7
- Assists: (Brazil) Machado 7.5
- Efficiency: (Australia) Jawai 56%

Uniforms
Home	Away
Blackout	City
Looney Tunes	Indigenous
- All statistics correct as of 9 March 2020.

The 2019–20 Cairns Taipans season was the 21st season for the Cairns Taipans in the NBL, and their second season under the guidance of head coach Mike Kelly. The team consisted of their imports (Scott Machado, D. J. Newbill and Cameron Oliver), eight regular roster players (George Blagojevic, Majok Deng, Mirko Djeric, Anthony Fisher, Nathan Jawai, Jarrod Kenny, Fabijan Krslovic and Kouat Noi) and their two development players (Tad Dufelmeier and Tai Wynyard). The squad was widely considered to be the underdogs of the NBL, with their roster lacking depth and having four rookies on their roster (Blagojevic, Fisher, Krslovic and Noi). These predictions also coupled with the Taipans' previous season, during which they struggled to compile wins and finished with a 6–22 record (include a run of 14 consecutive losses).

After having a successful pre-season (with a 6–3 record), the Taipans struggled during their early games. Despite leading in the early stages of their first three games, they failed to convert those leads into wins and lost their first three games of the season. However, their luck changed after a 23-point win against the Perth Wildcats in Perth, often regarded as one of the hardest games to win for any team in the NBL. After this victory, the Taipans had multiple close games, but then went on a 5-1 streak and impressed the league. The last of those wins was an 11-point win in Sydney which pushed the Snakes into the top four, and placed the team very highly with analysts as up until that round the Sydney Kings had been 11-1 and hadn't lost a home game by then. After this hot streak the Taipans failed to win either game the following round of Round 11, including an overtime game against the South East Melbourne Phoenix, however they won their only game of Round 12 to cut their dry spell short (a game in which they also recognised Aaron Grabau and his years with the club, and raised his jersey to the rafters of the Cairns Convention Centre). After a breakthrough win in Round 12, the Taipans created a winning streak, notching up wins against the 36ers, United, the Phoenix, the Bullets and the Breakers (who at the time were on a five-game winning streak of their own) before falling short against the Kings. Despite this the Taipans started on another winning streak, with a 19-point win against the 36ers on the road sealed their spot in the playoffs. After confirming their playoff spot, the Taipans lost their final two games by a combined total of 52 points.

At the league awards night multiple players received awards, most notably Machado winning the Fans MVP Award and being named in the All-NBL first squad. Newbill won the Best Defensive Award, Coach Kelly won the Coach of the Year Award and both Newbill and Oliver were named in the All-NBL second squad.

== Squad ==
=== Signings ===
- The Taipans retained two of their players over the off-season, Jarrod Kenny and Robert Loe, who had signed multiple season contracts before the 2019–20 season. Head Coach Mike Kelly and assistant Jamie O'Loughlin had also already signed for the 2019–20 season.
- On 5 April Majok Deng was signed. The South Sudanese–Australian power forward joined the Taipans from the Adelaide 36ers on a three–year deal.
- On 27 April Tom Jervis was signed on a two–year deal. The center joined the Taipans from the Perth Wildcats, who he had won a championship with the season prior.
- On 30 May Mirko Djeric signed with the Taipans. The Serbian–Australian previously played in the NBL during the 2015–16 season for the Townsville Crocodiles before relocating to Serbia to play in the Basketball League of Serbia, and most recently played for Dynamic Belgrade
- On 6 June Brad Hill resigned for his second season as assistant coach.
- On 13 June the Taipans elevated their development player Fabijan Krslovic to a regular roster position. The guard had spent multiple years at the club in a training and development position alongside Anthony Fisher and Christian Jurlina.
- On 4 July Kouat Noi was signed. The Sudanese–Australian was fresh from college, playing for Texas Christian University in the NCAA and signed with the club to develop his skills before the 2020 NBA draft.
- On 26 July Cameron Oliver was signed as the Taipans' first import. The American joined the club from the Delaware Blue Coats of the NBA G League.
- On 3 August Tom Jervis and the Taipans announced that he was released from his contract and that he would be retiring from the NBL.
- On 4 August Nathan Jawai announced that he was returning to Cairns for his fourth consecutive season, and his fifth overall season with the Taipans.
- On 9 August Scott Machado was signed as the Taipans' second import. Machado joined the club after playing for the Los Angeles Lakers and their G League team the South Bay Lakers.
- On 13 August Anthony Fisher signed with the club.
- On 14 August George Blagojevic signed with the club, joining Fisher and Krslovic as being promoted from their development/training role in the club. The trio also joined Noi with playing their debut professional season in a full roster position.
- On 17 August D. J. Newbill announced his return to Cairns. The star import for the Taipans the previous season filled the third and last import position on the roster.
- On 2 October the Taipans announced their two development players, Tad Dufelmeier and Tai Wynyard, at their corporate launch. The club also announced that Jawai and Newbill would lead the team as co-captains.

=== Roster ===
2019–20 Cairns Taipans roster
Players
Coaches

Pos.	No.	Nat.	Name	Ht.	Wt.	Age
F	0	(United States)	Oliver, Cameron (I)	2.03 m (6 ft 8 in)	102 kg (225 lb)	30 – 11 July 1996
G	3	(Brazil)	Machado, Scott (I)	1.85 m (6 ft 1 in)	82 kg (181 lb)	36 – 8 June 1990
G	4	(Australia)	Dufelmeier, Tad (DP)	1.83 m (6 ft 0 in)	79 kg (174 lb)	30 – 9 February 1996
G	5	(Australia)	Đerić, Mirko	1.88 m (6 ft 2 in)	82 kg (181 lb)	31 – 17 April 1995
G	6	(New Zealand)	Kenny, Jarrod	1.88 m (6 ft 2 in)	87 kg (192 lb)	41 – 17 September 1985
F	9	(Australia)	Blagojevic, George	2.03 m (6 ft 8 in)	100 kg (220 lb)	29 – 18 October 1996
F	12	(Australia)	Noi, Kouat	2.01 m (6 ft 7 in)	93 kg (205 lb)	28 – 29 October 1997
F	13	(South Sudan)	Deng, Majok	2.08 m (6 ft 10 in)	84 kg (185 lb)	33 – 1 March 1993
F/C	14	(New Zealand)	Wynyard, Tai (DP)	2.08 m (6 ft 10 in)	116 kg (256 lb)	28 – 5 February 1998
C	15	(Australia)	Jawai, Nathan (C)	2.09 m (6 ft 10 in)	140 kg (309 lb)	39 – 10 October 1986
F	20	(Australia)	Krslovic, Fabijan	2.03 m (6 ft 8 in)	108 kg (238 lb)	31 – 23 June 1995
G	25	(United States)	Newbill, D. J. (I & C)	1.93 m (6 ft 4 in)	95 kg (209 lb)	34 – 22 May 1992
G	32	(Australia)	Fisher, Anthony	1.87 m (6 ft 2 in)	78 kg (172 lb)	32 – 24 January 1994

Head coach

- (United States) Mike Kelly

Assistant coach(es)

- (Australia) Jamie O'Loughlin
- (Australia) Brad Hill
- (Australia) Lennon Smartt

Team manager

- (Australia) Brett Havercroft

Legend

- (C) Team captain
- (DP) Development player
- (IN) Inactive
- (I) Import player
- (TP) Training player
- (NS) Next Star player
- Injured

- Roster
Updated: 8 February 2020

=== Depth chart ===
Pos.	Starting 5	Bench 1	Bench 2	Development
C	Cameron Oliver	Nathan Jawai
PF	Majok Deng	Fabijan Krslovic		Tai Wynyard
SF	Mirko Djeric	Kouat Noi	George Blagojevic
SG	D. J. Newbill	Anthony Fisher
PG	Scott Machado	Jarrod Kenny		Tad Dufelmeier

== Preseason ==
As part of their pre-season, the Taipans played five pre-season games. Their first two games were held in Cairns against two American college teams, and the next three games were held in Melbourne against the South East Melbourne Phoenix and Melbourne United. They then played two games in Cairns against the Brisbane Bullets. As a club in the NBL they also took part in the NBL Blitz, and played games against the Adelaide 36ers and the NBL1 All-Stars, however they opted out of the NBLxNBA games.

=== Ladder ===
2019–20 NBL pre-season ladder
Ladder
Information

Pos.	Nat.	Name	Pld.	W.	L.	Last 5	Streak	Home	Away	For	Against	Pts %	Win %
1	(Australia)	Sydney	5	4	1	4–1	W3	1–0	3–1	486	394	123.35%	80.00%
2	(Australia)	Cairns	9	6	3	4–1	W4	3–1	3–2	811	763	106.29%	66.67%
3	(Australia)	S.E. Melbourne (NT)	9	6	3	4–1	W2	3–2	3–1	819	784	104.46%	66.67%
4	(Australia)	Melbourne	12	6	6	2–3	L2	4–3	2–3	1167	1095	106.58%	50.00%
5	(Australia)	Brisbane	8	4	4	3–2	W3	1–1	3–3	676	676	100.00%	50.00%
6	(Australia)	Illawarra	6	3	3	2–3	L2	1–1	2–2	598	631	94.77%	50.00%
7	(Australia)	Adelaide	10	4	6	1–4	L2	1–1	3–5	892	920	96.96%	40.00%
8	(Australia)	Perth (RC)	7	2	5	1–4	L1	1–2	1–3	625	671	93.14%	28.57%
9	(New Zealand)	New Zealand	6	1	5	0–5	L5	0–0	1–5	501	574	87.28%	16.67%

Total Rounds
11 weeks

Total Games
46 games

Legend
- (NT) New Team
- (RC) Reigning Champion

- Updated: 17 October 2019

=== Preseason game log ===
==== August ====
N/A

7 August 2019
19:30

boxscore
report

(Australia) Cairns Taipans 85, (United States) California Baptist Lancers 76
Scoring by quarter: 23–20, 19–21, 20–14, 23–21
Pts: Djeric 17; Rebs: Jawai 8 Asts: Dufelmeier 7	Pts: Boyd 23; Rebs: Davis 9 Asts: Armstrong, Boyd, Davis, Kuol 2

Early Settler Stadium, Cairns
Attendance: not available
Referees: Nico Fernandes, Mark Mill, Alex McEwan

N/A

8 August 2019
20:30

boxscore
report

(Australia) Cairns Taipans 85, (United States) Creighton Bluejays 89
Scoring by quarter: 29–13, 28–23, 11–31, 17–22
Pts: Noi 25; Rebs: Noi 12; Asts: Djeric 7	Pts: Mintz 18; Rebs: Jefferson 6 Asts: Jones 5

Early Settler Stadium, Cairns
Attendance: 300
Referees: Nico Fernandes, Mark Mill, Alex McEwan

==== September ====
N/A

4 September 2019
19:30

boxscore
report

South East Melbourne Phoenix 102, Cairns Taipans 106 (OT)
Scoring by quarter: 23–24, 28–30, 21–12, 18–24, Overtime: 12–16
Pts: Roberson 25; Rebs: Pineau, Wesley 7 Asts: Wesley 6	Pts: Newbill 26; Rebs: Noi, Oliver 8 Asts: Machado 14

State Basketball Centre, Wantirna South
Attendance: not available
Referees: Chris Reid, Daniel Battye, Ruben Woolcock

Facebook

6 September 2019
19:30

boxscore
broadcast
report

Melbourne United 104, Cairns Taipans 88
Scoring by quarter: 29–20, 27–20, 23–27, 25–21
Pts: Long 18; Rebs: Lual-Acuil 8 Asts: McCarron 4	Pts: Noi 15; Rebs: Deng 8 Asts: Deng 3

Casey Basketball Stadium, Cranbourne
Attendance: not available
Referees: Jon Chapman, Ruben Woolcock, Daniel Battye

Facebook

8 September 2019
14:00

boxscore
broadcast
report

South East Melbourne Phoenix 93, Cairns Taipans 80
Scoring by quarter: 26–18, 19–25, 32–14, 16–23
Pts: Wesley 21; Rebs: Benson 11; Asts: Roberson, Wesley 6	Pts: Oliver 24; Rebs: Noi 5 Asts: Djeric 4

Kilsyth Basketball Stadium, Kilsyth
Attendance: not available
Referees: not available

N/A

13 September 2019
19:30

boxscore
report

Cairns Taipans 104, Brisbane Bullets 66
Scoring by quarter: 23–12, 33–23, 20–21, 28–10
Pts: Blagojevic, Oliver 13; Rebs: Noi 9 Asts: Fisher 5	Pts: Singler 10; Rebs: Magnay 6 Asts: Singler 4

Early Settler Stadium, Cairns
Attendance: not available
Referees: Vaughan Mayberry, Marc Mill, Alex McEwan

N/A

15 September 2019
14:00

boxscore
report

Cairns Taipans 76, Brisbane Bullets 66
Scoring by quarter: 24–19, 25–18, 14–14, 13–15
Pts: Dufelmeier, Newbill 16; Rebs: Blagojevic 9 Asts: Newbill 5	Pts: Patterson 21; Rebs: Magnay 7 Asts: Cadee 8

Early Settler Stadium, Cairns
Attendance: not available
Referees: Toni Caldwell, Marc Mill, Jacqui Dover

=== NBL Blitz Game Log ===
==== Game 1 ====
Facebook, Twitch

19 September 2019
20:00

boxscore
broadcast
report

Cairns Taipans 100, Adelaide 36ers 99
Scoring by quarter: 19–22, 27–19, 34–27, 20–30
Pts: Newbill 18; Rebs: Jawai 7 Asts: Machado 7	Pts: Johnson 27; Rebs: Froling 7 Asts: Taylor 4

Ulverstone Sports & Leisure Centre, Ulverstone, Tasmania
Attendance: 1,300
Referees: Jon Chapman, Nico Fernandez, Travis Stewart

After a media day in Melbourne, the Taipans travelled to Tasmania to compete in the NBL Blitz, an annual pre-season tournament consisting of every NBL team, and this season an All-Star team from the NBL1. The pool the Taipans competed in consisted of the Adelaide 36ers, the Brisbane Bullets, the NBL1 All-Stars and the Taipans. This pool's first set of games was held in Ulverstone, at the Ulverstone Sports & Leisure Centre on 19 September 2019.

The Taipans first game was against the Adelaide 36ers. Newbill, the Taipans nominated captain for the game, opened the game with a three-point shot to give the Taipans the initial lead, however the 36ers wrestled their way to a three-point lead. After a brief scoreless period for the Taipans, Newbill shot another three to draw the game before a free throw affair saw the scores slowly raised to 7–8 in favour of the 36ers. Offensive work from Noi saw the game return to field goal shooting, with late points from Dillon handing the 36ers a three-point lead heading into the first break.

Entering the second quarter, Froling helped give the 36ers another two points to add to their lead, but the duo of Machado and Oliver spearheaded the Taipans fightback and lead the team to a 37–31 lead halfway through the quarter. After their charge early in the quarter, Newbill took the reins and added five of his own points to hold back Johnson, the only 36er to score for the final four minutes of the half. The Taipans led into the main break 46–42.

In a move opposite to the second quarter, the 36ers charged into the third quarter with Dillon, Kyei and Taylor all contributing to the three point lead the 36ers held over the Taipans. The Taipans shooting, particularly from range, helped restrict the lead growing any further, and another charge from the Taipans, led by Fisher and Jawai, saw an extensive lead return to them at the end of the quarter, with the final lead being 13 points.

The Taipans continued their run into the final quarter, with an unanswered eight points extending their lead to 17 points. However, after only scoring four points across six minutes, the 36ers quickly caught up to the Taipans, and with 40 seconds remaining they took the lead. After a high scoring final minute, the 36ers held a three-point lead before Johnson fouling on Krslovic who was shooting a three-point shot took the Taipans to the free throw line to shoot three shots and potentially draw the game. After making the first two shots, Krslovic missed the third and final shot which would have tied the game, however a tip in by Jawai gave the Taipans a 100–99 win against the 36ers.

==== Game 2 ====
Facebook, Twitch

21 September 2019
17:30

boxscore
broadcast
report

Cairns Taipans 87, NBL1 All Stars 68
Scoring by quarter: 23–16, 25–10, 19–27, 20–15
Pts: Noi 18; Rebs: Noi 10; Asts: Djeric 6	Pts: Turner 21; Rebs: Swetalla 10; Asts: Bezman 3

Silverdome, Launceston, Tasmania
Attendance: 670
Referees: Craig Copes, Elliot Green, James Girguol

After sitting out day 2, the Taipans played on day 3 in Launceston against the NBL1 All Stars who lost their first game against the Brisbane Bullets 106–57. Playing in front of the 670 fans in attendance at the Silverdome, the fourth smallest attendance at the Blitz, the Taipans were keen to repeat the Bullets demolition of the NBL1 team, particularly given the Taipans' defeating the Bullets in both of their pre-season games.

After a scoreless first minute, including three missed shots and one turnover, Deng kick started the game with back-to-back points. Despite Deng's quick start to the game, Doyle and Thomas replied with seven points of their own to take a 4–7 lead. A constant stream of points from both teams held the game level until the final minute, with both teams failing to build a lead of more than four points before Krslovic and Jawai took the Taipans lead out to 23–16 by the first break.

Similar to the first quarter, both teams failed to open their accounts early in the second quarter. It took nearly two minutes, five missed shots and a turnover before a Jawai lay up started the flow of points for the Taipans. Despite the Taipans slow start to the quarter, the NBL1 All Stars took even longer to start scoring and nearly took half of the quarter to score their first points of the quarter, by which the Taipans had extended their lead out to 35–18. The seemingly constant stream of points for the Taipans lasted most of the quarter, with a three-point shot late in the quarter by Noi extending their to 26 points, their highest of the game. The All Stars managed to score a few last points of the half to limited the Taipans lead, 48–26.

Scoring straight after the start of the third quarter, the Taipans seemed ready to continue on their dominant streak. However, the All Stars soon found themselves slowly closing the large points gap which had been created between the two teams. Despite this, the All Stars didn't last long before the Taipans started to rebuild their lead, with Blagojevic and Krslovic forming the backbone of this resurgence. As the quarter closed it was clear that the team on the floor wasn't the main line-up the Taipans had, with their lead shrinking to 67–53 without a clear leader to guide them to success.

The final quarter saw a return to the slow starts of the first two quarters, with Turner of the All Stars being the first to score after one minute and 46 seconds. After a scoreless minute Oliver finally replied with points of his own, but that was quickly silenced by a three-point shot by Barker which drew the Taipans lead down to 10 points, the closest the All Stars would come to the Taipans in the second half. After another lack-luster minute Noi and Newbill added eight points to the Taipans' lead over 34 seconds, which took the All Stars nearly two minutes to respond to. Deng and Fisher closed out the games for the Taipans and rebuilt their lead up to 19 points, ending the game at 87–68; much closer than the Taipans would have wanted.

== Regular season ==
The regular season of the NBL consisted of 28 games, with the Taipans' 14 home games being played at the Cairns Convention Centre.

=== Ladder ===
Pos	2019–20 NBL season											
Pos	Team	Pld	W	L	PCT	Last 5	Streak	Home	Away	PF	PA	PP
1	Sydney Kings	28	20	8	71.43%	4–1	W2	12–2	8–6	2642	2472	106.88%
2	Perth Wildcats	28	19	9	67.86%	4–1	W3	11–3	8–6	2529	2409	104.98%
3	Cairns Taipans	28	16	12	57.14%	3–2	L2	11–3	5–9	2587	2547	101.57%
4	Melbourne United	28	15	13	53.57%	4–1	W3	9–5	6–8	2638	2560	103.05%
5	Brisbane Bullets	28	15	13	53.57%	3–2	W1	10–4	5–9	2607	2557	101.96%
6	New Zealand Breakers	28	15	13	53.57%	4–1	W4	9–5	6–8	2514	2468	101.86%
7	Adelaide 36ers	28	12	16	42.86%	1–4	L2	8–6	4–10	2654	2768	95.88%
8	S.E. Melbourne Phoenix	28	9	19	32.14%	0–5	L8	6–8	3–11	2671	2761	96.74%
9	Illawarra Hawks	28	5	23	17.86%	0–5	L10	3–11	2–12	2354	2654	88.70%

Updated to match(es) played on 16 February 2020. Source: NBL.com.au

=== Ladder progression ===
- Numbers highlighted in green indicate that the team finished the round inside the top four.
- Numbers highlighted in blue indicates the team finished first on the ladder in that round.
- Numbers highlighted in red indicates the team finished last place on the ladder in that round.

2019–20 NBL season
Team	1	2	3	4	5	6	7	8	9	10	11	12	13	14	15	16	17	18	19	20
Adelaide 36ers	–	8	4	4	5	6	6	5	5	6	4	5	5	5	5	7	7	7	7	7
Brisbane Bullets	2	4	5	5	4	5	5	6	7	7	7	7	8	7	6	5	4	4	5	5
Cairns Taipans	7	7	6	6	8	8	7	7	6	4	6	4	4	4	3	3	3	3	3	3
Illawarra Hawks	6	5	7	9	9	9	9	8	9	9	9	9	9	9	9	9	9	9	9	9
Melbourne United	5	6	8	8	6	4	3	3	4	3	3	3	3	3	4	4	5	6	6	4
New Zealand Breakers	–	–	9	7	7	7	8	9	8	8	8	8	7	6	8	6	6	5	4	6
Perth Wildcats	4	2	3	2	2	3	2	2	2	2	2	2	2	2	2	2	2	2	2	2
S.E. Melbourne Phoenix	3	3	2	3	3	2	4	4	3	5	5	6	6	8	7	8	8	8	8	8
Sydney Kings	1	1	1	1	1	1	1	1	1	1	1	1	1	1	1	1	1	1	1	1

=== Game log ===
==== Round 1 ====
ESPN

4 October 2019
19:30

boxscore
report

Cairns Taipans 71, Sydney Kings 79
Scoring by quarter: 20–13, 21–24, 22–20, 8–22
Pts: Noi 14; Rebs: Noi 12; Asts: Machado 8	Pts: Ware 23; Rebs: Bogut 12; Asts: Ware, Bogut 5

Cairns Convention Centre, Cairns, Queensland
Attendance: 4,370
Referees: Scott Beker, Toni Caldwell, Ruben Woolcock

After a busy pre-season, the Taipans returned to Cairns to rest before their first game. Despite playing nine pre-season games, their first game was against a team they didn't play during the pre-season; the Sydney Kings, and a crowd of 4,730 packed into the Cairns Convention Centre to see the season start.

Similar to their last pre-season game against the NBL1 All Stars, the Taipans initially struggled to score with Deng and Oliver both failing to score, before a drive by Machado delivered the first points of the game to the Snakes. Another scoreless minute passed before Machado was able to score again, with Deng, Newbill, Noi, Oliver (Taipans), Newley and Ware (Kings) unable to take advantage of multiple opportunities. After their slow start, the Kings found successive buckets to take a one-point lead, however sharp shooting from Noi and Oliver retook the lead for the Taipans and led them to a 10–5 lead. The Kings responded with points of their own, but shortly after the scoreless streak returned for nearly two minutes, with both sides failing to get a bucket before a Jawai layup returned scoring to the game. These points started a flow of points, which in the final minutes of the quarter doubled the score during the scoreless period. Despite a layup by Newley in the dying seconds of the quarter, the Taipans took a 20–13 lead into the first break.

Both teams resumed the flow of points at the resumption of the game, and made up for the lack of early scoring. Within minutes, the Kings managed fight back and briefly regain the lead, however sharp shooting by Noi led the Taipans in their fight. At the middle of the second quarter the game had seemingly returned to its earlier state, with both teams only able to score free throws over the middle minutes. The first player to successfully score after this period was Newbill with a shot from beyond the arc, but Bruce responded with a three-point shot of his own to limit the damage. The remaining minutes of the half predominately saw the teams returning serve with three-point shots, with a total of five successful threes across the final four minute. The latest of these was from Newbill, who created a four-point lead for the Taipans leading into the main break, 41–37.

Keen to build their lead in the third quarter, the Taipans quickly built up a 12-point lead over the opening four minutes of the quarter, with Deng, Machado, Noi and Oliver contributing to the lead. Another quiet period across the middle of the quarter settled the game, with the Snakes being unable to build their lead. After the main Taipans lineup left the court and were replaced by the bench, the Kings slowly began to claw back the lead, however with Newbill still on the court the Taipans retained their lead going into the final break, 63–57.

A sloppy start to the final quarter limited the Taipans attempts to rebuild their lead, with eight unanswered points from the Kings leveling the scores with five minutes left to play. Not content with tying the game, the Kings began to build their lead, with three points from the Taipans in the final five minutes doing little to stop them. The Kings won the game 71–79, with this game serving as the base for their six-game winning streak.

Post game, Taipans Head Coach Mike Kelly commented on the missed opportunities, and stated that his team "didn't take full advantage all the time of that tonight."

==== Round 2 ====
ESPN

11 October 2019
18:30

boxscore
broadcast
report

Brisbane Bullets 90, Cairns Taipans 74
Scoring by quarter: 21–24, 24–25, 31–14, 14–11
Pts: Sobey 21; Rebs: Patterson 6 Asts: Braun, Patterson, Sobey 5	Pts: Machado, Oliver 16; Rebs: Noi, Oliver 7 Asts: Machado 10

Nissan Arena, Brisbane, Queensland
Attendance: 2,070
Referees: Vaughn Mayberry, Toni Caldwell, Marc Mills

After losing their first game of the season, the Taipans travelled down to Brisbane to visit their state rivals the Brisbane Bullets, who were hosting their first game at the Queensland State Netball Centre (later to be rebranded as Nissan Arena). The battle drew an attendance of 2,070 fans, which at the time was the lowest attendance of the season, and was narrowly beaten by a New Zealand Breakers game hosting 2,054 fans.

Starting strong out of the game, the Taipans quickly piled on points and fought their way to a 5–12 lead. After going down early in the game, the Bullets regathered and limited the Snakes' scoring opportunities whilst Braun and Gliddon puts points of their own on the board. Despite this, the trio of Deng, Djeric and Oliver rebuilt their lead and extended it to nine points before the Bullets could respond. Continuing his form from earlier in the game, Gliddon and Te Rangi made multiple three point shots to level the game as the quarter closed, however a Machado three in the dying seconds handed the lead back to the Taipans.

After ending the first quarter with some points, Machado added some more points in the early seconds of the quarter, but the Bullets quickly responded. After a back and forth battle for the opening minutes of the quarter, a layup by Hodgson took the lead for the Bullets heading into the second half of the quarter. A fightback led by Noi and Oliver quickly led to the Taipans regaining their lead, with the lead reaching seven points before Sobey drew the lead back to four points by the end of the quarter.

Starting strong after half-time, the Bullets dominated the opening minutes and out-scored the Taipans 7-1 and took a four-point lead. A Machado three and a layup was only dampened by Hodgson's own layup, and they quickly drew the scores to within a point. A few tense minutes followed, with both teams fighting for the lead. Over the course of a minute both team shot well from three, with a combined total of three successful shots from four attempts and the final three from Oliver levelling the game again. After multiple turnovers by the Taipans and some quick points by the Bullets, Brisbane's lead quickly expanded to eight points. Limited scoring at the end of the quarter from the Taipans allowed that lead to be extended, finishing the quarter at 76–63.

In the final quarter the Bullets continued their scoring streak, and built their lead up to 18 points before a fight from the Taipans drew the lead back to 15 points. In the final minutes the score jumped between a 15 and 18 point lead, with the Bullets eventually winning with a 16-point lead, 90–74.

After the game, head coach Mike Kelly put the defeat down to his team being unable to cope with the pressure during the second half; "We didn't respond to their pressure well, we turned the ball over when they came out in attack mode."

ESPN

14 October 2019
19:30

boxscore
report

Illawarra Hawks 89, Cairns Taipans 88
Scoring by quarter: 18–23, 20–20, 28–17, 23–28
Pts: Blanchfield 20; Rebs: Ogilvy 6 Asts: Brooks 6	Pts: Newbill 26; Rebs: Oliver 7 Asts: Machado 6

WIN Entertainment Centre, Wollongong, New South Wales
Attendance: 2,614
Referees: Vaughan Mayberry, James Boyer, Ruben Woolcock

==== Round 3 ====
ESPN

18 October 2019
18:30

boxscore
broadcast
report

Perth Wildcats 76, Cairns Taipans 99
Scoring by quarter: 22–24, 22–22, 16–28, 16–25
Pts: Kay, White 15; Rebs: Hunt 8 Asts: Martin 6	Pts: Deng, Oliver 22; Rebs: Jawai, Oliver 9 Asts: Machado 7

RAC Arena, Perth, Western Australia
Attendance: 12,331
Referees: Chris Reid, Nico Fernandes, Nathan Durant

==== Round 4 ====
ESPN

25 October 2019
19:00

boxscore
broadcast
report

Adelaide 36ers 101, Cairns Taipans 97
Scoring by quarter: 22–30, 33–19, 29–20, 17–28
Pts: Randle 22; Rebs: Kyei 9 Asts: Drmic 3	Pts: Oliver 21; Rebs: Oliver 8 Asts: Machado 9

Adelaide Entertainment Centre, Adelaide, South Australia
Attendance: 6,288
Referees: Chris Reid, Nathan Durant, Nico Fernandes

ESPN

28 October 2019
18:30

boxscore
report

Cairns Taipans 90, Melbourne United 85
Scoring by quarter: 19–31, 22–14, 26–21, 23–19
Pts: Jawai 18; Rebs: Oliver 11; Asts: Machado 8	Pts: Long, Trimble 21; Rebs: Long 17; Asts: Goulding 5

Cairns Convention Centre, Cairns, Queensland
Attendance: 3,920
Referees: Vaughan Mayberry, Damian Lyons, Mitch Hare

==== Round 5 ====
Sky Sport

31 October 2019
19:30

boxscore
report

New Zealand Breakers 93, Cairns Taipans 85
Scoring by quarter: 22–11, 23–23, 17–23, 31–28
Pts: Webster 23; Rebs: Ashley 11; Asts: Webster 8	Pts: Oliver 23; Rebs: Deng, Newbill 7 Asts: Machado 9

Spark Arena, Auckland, New Zealand
Attendance: 7,943
Referees: Chris Reid, Ryan Jones, Mitch Hare

==== Round 6 ====
ESPN

9 November 2019
19:00

boxscore
report

Cairns Taipans 91, Illawarra Hawks 101
Scoring by quarter: 21–22, 24–37, 23–19, 23–23
Pts: Djeric 19; Rebs: Oliver 7 Asts: Jawai 5	Pts: Ball 24; Rebs: Boone, Ogilvy 9 Asts: Ball 9

Cairns Convention Centre, Cairns, Queensland
Attendance: 5,092
Referees: Chris Reid, Nathan Durant, Marc Mill

==== Round 7 ====
ESPN

16 November 2019
19:00

boxscore
report

Cairns Taipans 94, Brisbane Bullets 85
Scoring by quarter: 24–20, 25–19, 27–18, 18–28
Pts: Noi 20; Rebs: Noi 10; Asts: Machado 9	Pts: Sobey 20; Rebs: Hodgson 9 Asts: Sobey 7

Cairns Convention Centre, Cairns, Queensland
Attendance: 4,017
Referees: Damian Lyons, Toni Caldwell, Marc Mill

==== Round 8 ====
ESPN

23 November 2019
19:00

boxscore
report

Cairns Taipans 91, Perth Wildcats 84
Scoring by quarter: 21–21, 19–29, 20–20, 31–14
Pts: Noi 19; Rebs: Jawai, Noi 6 Asts: Machado 9	Pts: Steindl 17; Rebs: Martin 5 Asts: Kay, Martin 4

Cairns Convention Centre, Cairns, Queensland
Attendance: 4,035
Referees: Vaughan Mayberry, James Boyer, Marc Mill

ESPN

25 November 2019
19:30

boxscore
report

Illawarra Hawks 114, Cairns Taipans 106 (OT)
Scoring by quarter: 29–23, 30–24, 20–24, 20–28, Overtime: 15–7
Pts: Ball 32; Rebs: Ball 11; Asts: Ball 13	Pts: Newbill 27; Rebs: Oliver 10; Asts: Machado 13

WIN Entertainment Centre, Wollongong, New South Wales
Attendance: 3,275
Referees: Michael Aylen, Damien Lyons, Ruben Woolcock

==== Round 9 ====
ESPN

29 November 2019
18:30

boxscore
broadcast
report

Cairns Taipans 93, Melbourne United 86
Scoring by quarter: 20–26, 27–18, 22–13, 24–29
Pts: Oliver 26; Rebs: Oliver 13; Asts: Machado 10	Pts: Goulding 19; Rebs: Long 14; Asts: Goulding, Trimble 4

Cairns Convention Centre, Cairns, Queensland
Attendance: 3,904
Referees: Vaughan Mayberry, Toni Caldwell, Nathan Durant

==== Round 10 ====
ESPN

6 December 2019
18:30

boxscore
report

Cairns Taipans 108, New Zealand Breakers 90
Scoring by quarter: 3122, 30–22, 20–27, 27–19
Pts: Machado 22; Rebs: Oliver 10; Asts: Machado 7	Pts: Rice Jr. 30; Rebs: Rice Jr. 12; Asts: Rice Jr. 8

Cairns Convention Centre, Cairns, Queensland
Attendance: 3,992
Referees: Vaughan Mayberry, Damian Lyons, James Griguol

SBS Viceland

8 December 2019
17:00

boxscore
report

Sydney Kings 98, Cairns Taipans 109
Scoring by quarter: 19–30, 24–19, 2025, 35–35
Pts: Ware 23; Rebs: Bogut 12; Asts: Ware 7	Pts: Newbill 31; Rebs: Machado 7 Asts: Machado 9

Qudos Bank Arena, Sydney, New South Wales
Attendance: 8,638
Referees: Nico Fernandes, Chris Reid, James Griguol

==== Round 11 ====
ESPN

12 December 2019
18:30

boxscore
broadcast
report

Cairns Taipans 84, Perth Wildcats 88
Scoring by quarter: 21–24, 30–23, 18–16, 15–25
Pts: Oliver 21; Rebs: Oliver 17; Asts: Machado 12	Pts: Cotton 24; Rebs: Kay 11; Asts: Kay 5

Cairns Convention Centre, Cairns, Queensland
Attendance: 4,358
Referees: Vaughan Mayberry, Toni Caldwell, Alex McEwan

SBS Viceland

15 December 2019
17:00

boxscore
report

South East Melbourne Phoenix 112, Cairns Taipans 105 (OT)
Scoring by quarter: 30–28, 21–18, 20–30, 24–19, Overtime: 17–10
Pts: Roberson 32; Rebs: Creek, Pineau 9 Asts: Wesley 6	Pts: Newbill 30; Rebs: Oliver 13; Asts: Machado 6

Melbourne Arena, Melbourne, Victoria
Attendance: 3,856
Referees: Michael Aylen, Damian Lyons, Travis Stewart

==== Round 12 ====
SBS Viceland

22 December 2019
16:00

boxscore
report

Cairns Taipans 94, Adelaide 36ers 86
Scoring by quarter: 31–17, 26–27, 17–21, 20–21
Pts: Newbill 26; Rebs: Oliver 15; Asts: Machado 13	Pts: Randle 19; Rebs: Griffin 11; Asts: Randle 7

Cairns Convention Centre, Cairns, Queensland
Attendance: Michael Aylen, Toni Caldwell, Marc Mill
Referees: 4,265

==== Round 13 ====
ESPN

26 December 2019
19:30

boxscore
broadcast
report

Melbourne United 75, Cairns Taipans 77
Scoring by quarter: 9–20, 21–26, 23–17, 22–14
Pts: Trimble 16; Rebs: Long 12; Asts: Goulding, Ili, McCarron 2	Pts: Machado, Newbill 20; Rebs: Jawai 9 Asts: Machado 5

Melbourne Arena, Melbourne, Victoria
Attendance: 10,300
Referees: Michael Aylen, Scott Beker, Ruben Woolcock

ESPN

31 December 2019
19:00

boxscore
report

Cairns Taipans 92, South East Melbourne Phoenix 84
Scoring by quarter: 26–22, 11–21, 32–19, 23–22
Pts: Machado 29; Rebs: Oliver 10; Asts: Machado 8	Pts: Roberson 19; Rebs: Pineau 9 Asts: Creek, Roberson 5

Cairns Convention Centre, Cairns, Queensland
Attendance: 5,134
Referees: Vaughan Mayberry, Jon Chapman, Mark Mill

==== Round 14 ====
ESPN

3 January 2020
18:30

boxscore
report

Cairns Taipans 91, Brisbane Bullets 89
Scoring by quarter: 23–19, 25–24, 29–16, 14–30
Pts: Newbill 28; Rebs: Oliver 12; Asts: Djeric, Machado 6	Pts: Singler 20; Rebs: Magnay 8 Asts: Patterson 6

Cairns Convention Centre, Cairns, Queensland
Attendance: Michael Aylen, Damian Lyons, Toni Caldwell
Referees: 4,573

==== Round 15 ====
ESPN

9 January 2020
18:30

boxscore
report

Cairns Taipans 85, New Zealand Breakers 79
Scoring by quarter: 20–25, 30–19, 14–20, 21–15
Pts: Machado 29; Rebs: Oliver 8 Asts: Machado 3	Pts: Loe 24; Rebs: Abercrombie, Loe, Hopson 7 Asts: Hopson 8

Cairns Convention Centre, Cairns, Queensland
Attendance: 4,392
Referees: Vaughan Mayberry, Toni Caldwell, Scott Beker

SBS Viceland

11 January 2020
17:30

boxscore
report

Sydney Kings 92, Cairns Taipans 83
Scoring by quarter: 23–16, 21–21, 24–23, 24–23
Pts: Kickert 18; Rebs: Bogut, Cooks, Tate 8 Asts: Ware 4	Pts: Deng 18; Rebs: Oliver 7 Asts: Newbill 7

Qudos Bank Arena, Sydney, New South Wales
Attendance: 10,857
Referees: Chris Reid, Scott Beker, Nico Fernandez

==== Round 16 ====
ESPN

18 January 2020
19:00

boxscore
report

Cairns Taipans 108, Adelaide 36ers 91
Scoring by quarter: 30–18, 24–25, 31–28, 23–20
Pts: Newbill 28; Rebs: Oliver 15; Asts: Machado 9	Pts: Johnson 38; Rebs: Randle 9 Asts: Randle 10

Cairns Convention Centre, Cairns, Queensland
Attendance: 4,696
Referees: Chris Reid, Scott Beker, Daniel Battye

==== Round 17 ====
SBS Viceland

26 January 2020
15:00

boxscore
report

South East Melbourne Phoenix 102, Cairns Taipans 103
Scoring by quarter: 31–31, 20–24, 21–31, 30–17
Pts: Creek 32; Rebs: Creek 10; Asts: Roberson 7	Pts: Machado 24; Rebs: Oliver 9 Asts: Machado 8

State Basketball Centre, Wantirna South, Victoria
Attendance: 3,685
Referees: Chris Reid, Nathan Durant, James Boyer

==== Round 18 ====
ESPN

31 January 2020
19:00

boxscore
report

Cairns Taipans 99, Illawarra Hawks 75
Scoring by quarter: 23–17, 34–23, 28–17, 14–18
Pts: Newbill 20; Rebs: Krslovic, Oliver 5 Asts: Machado 10	Pts: Boone 19; Rebs: Boone 10; Asts: Dech, Hobson 4

Cairns Convention Centre, Cairns, Queensland
Attendance: 5,168
Referees: Jon Chapman, Toni Caldwell, Nico Fernandes

==== Round 19 ====
ESPN

8 February 2020
19:30

boxscore
report

Adelaide 36ers 80, Cairns Taipans 99
Scoring by quarter: 20–27, 25–30, 16–17, 19–25
Pts: Johnson 14; Rebs: Griffin 9 Asts: Johnson, Randle 5	Pts: Oliver 31; Rebs: Oliver 11; Asts: Machado 6

Adelaide Entertainment Centre, Adelaide, South Australia
Attendance: 7,993
Referees: Michael Aylen, Damian Lyons, Nathan Durant

==== Round 20 ====
ESPN

13 February 2020
19:30

boxscore
broadcast
report

Melbourne United 99, Cairns Taipans 83
Scoring by quarter: 20–18, 25–24, 23–25, 31–16
Pts: Goulding 23; Rebs: Long 10; Asts: McCarron 8	Pts: Oliver 19; Rebs: Oliver 14; Asts: Machado 9

Melbourne Arena, Melbourne, Victoria
Attendance: 6,315
Referees: Vaughan Mayberry, Damian Lyons, Mitch Hare

SBS Viceland

15 February 2020
16:30

boxscore
report

Brisbane Bullets 124, Cairns Taipans 88
Scoring by quarter: 39–15, 24–30, 35–24, 26–19
Pts: Sobey 30; Rebs: Hodgson, Singler 9 Asts: Singler, Sobey 6	Pts: Deng 20; Rebs: Krslovic 8 Asts: Djeric4

Nissan Arena, Brisbane, Queensland
Attendance: 5,145
Referees: Chris Reid, Toni Caldwell, Nico Fernandes

== Postseason ==
=== Semifinals ===
ESPN
SBS Viceland

28 February 2020
18:30

boxscore
broadcast
report

Perth Wildcats 108, Cairns Taipans 107 (OT)
Scoring by quarter: 29–20, 16–34, 23–17, 25–22, Overtime: 15–14
Pts: Cotton 42; Rebs: Kay 9 Asts: Cotton, Kay 6	Pts: Machado 32; Rebs: Oliver 18; Asts: Machado 9
Perth leads series, 1–0

RAC Arena, Perth, Western Australia
Attendance: 10,858
Referees: Vaughan Mayberry, Chris Reid, Nico Fernandes

ESPN
SBS Viceland

1 March 2020
16:00

boxscore
broadcast
report

Cairns Taipans 85, Perth Wildcats 74
Scoring by quarter: 30–16, 17–15, 16–22, 22–21
Pts: Oliver 22; Rebs: Oliver 19; Asts: Machado 4	Pts: Steindl 18; Rebs: Kay 10; Asts: Kay 4
Series tied 1–1

Cairns Convention Centre, Cairns, Queensland
Attendance: 5,188
Referees: Vaughan Mayberry, Chris Reid, Nico Fernandes

ESPN
SBS Viceland

5 March 2020
18:30

boxscore
broadcast

Perth Wildcats 93, Cairns Taipans 82
Scoring by quarter: 25–24, 27–20, 24–22, 17–16
Pts: White 26; Rebs: Kay 12; Asts: Cotton 8	Pts: Oliver 20; Rebs: Oliver 8 Asts: Machado 6
Perth wins series, 2–1

RAC Arena, Perth, Western Australia
Attendance: 10,215
Referees: Michael Aylen, Damien Lyons, Nico Fernandes

== Awards ==
=== Regular season ===
==== Player of the Week ====
Round 9, Cameron Oliver

Round 15, Scott Machado

Round 19, Cameron Oliver

==== MVP ====
Round 3, @ Perth Wildcats: Cameron Oliver

Round 4, vs Melbourne United: Scott Machado

Round 7, vs Brisbane Bullets: Kouat Noi

Round 8, vs Perth Wildcats: Scott Machado

Round 9, vs Melbourne United: Cameron Oliver

Round 10, vs New Zealand Breakers: Scott Machado

Round 10, @ Sydney Kings: Scott Machado

Round 12, vs Adelaide 36ers: Cameron Oliver

Round 13, @ Melbourne United: Scott Machado

Round 13, vs South East Melbourne Phoenix: Scott Machado

Round 14, vs Brisbane Bullets: D. J. Newbill

Round 15, vs New Zealand Breakers: Scott Machado

Round 16, vs Adelaide 36ers: Cameron Oliver

Round 17, @ South East Melbourne Phoenix: Scott Machado

Round 18, vs Illawarra Hawks: Cameron Oliver

Round 19, @ Adelaide 36ers: Cameron Oliver

=== NBL Awards Night ===
- Best Defensive Player: D. J. Newbill
- Fans MVP: Scott Machado
- Coach of the Year (Lindsay Gaze Trophy): Mike Kelly
- All-NBL First Team:
  - Scott Machado
- All-NBL Second Team:
  - D. J. Newbill
  - Cameron Oliver

=== Club Awards Night ===
==== Most Valuable Player ====
Scott Machado – After winning the NBL Fans MVP award, Machado took top honours at the Taipans Awards Night. During the regular season he was able to topple the NBL assists record and set up his teammates, whilst still scoring 16.11 points per game and shooting at 45% from the field.

==== Coaches Award ====
Fabijan Krslovic – After spending one year as a development player, which included multiple appearances on-court due to injured teammates, Krslovic has worked his way throughout the season from playing the role of a bench warmer up to being in the regular rotations during games, including an average of 11.38 minutes during a game at the end of the regular season. Fabijan also had several standout performances late in the season, including a five rebound and four steal game against the Illawarra Hawks, a seven rebound and four block game against the Adelaide 36ers and a 12-point and eight rebound game against the Brisbane Bullets.

==== Best Defensive Player ====
D. J. Newbill – After winning the NBL Best Defensive Player Award, Newbill took home his second straight Best Defensive Player award during his time with the Taipans. Through his work ethic, he had his best statistical year in the NBL since joining the league in 2017, including averaging more steals and less fouls across the season than both of his previous two seasons in the league, which complemented his highest scoring season in the NBL.

==== Member's Choice MVP ====
Cameron Oliver – After entertaining both the local fans and crowds across the NBL, and making many appearances in the NBL Top 10 Plays of the Week, Oliver was voted the Taipans member's favourite player of the season. Oliver also finished the regular season performing very well in a number of stats, including 17.04 points per game, 9.11 rebounds per game (second best in the league) and 1.63 blocks per game (second best in the league).

==== Player's Player ====
Jarrod Kenny – Being highly regarded by his teammates who gave him the award, Kenny "committed himself to the team values and expectation that were set for the 2019/20 season".

==== Club Person of the Year ====
Ash Constable – Originally starting as a development player for the Cairns Taipans over the 2014/15 and 2015/16 seasons, Constable has since moved his role in the club off-court where he "tirelessly help[s] the Taipans admin [team], all while dedicating time to Cairns Basketball programs".

==== Commitment to Community ====
Kouat Noi – Throughout the season Kouat spent large amounts of time in the community, including at multiple school visits, his multiple visits to local basketball courts to train with kids, and his Mannequin Challenge series on Instagram (part 1 and part 2).

=== Postseason ===
==== MVP ====
Semi-final Game 2, vs Perth Wildcats: Cameron Oliver

== See also ==
- 2019–20 NBL season
- Cairns Taipans
