= 2019 NBL pre-season =

The pre-season of the 2019–20 NBL season, the 42nd season of Australia's National Basketball League, started on 19 June and ended on 16 October 2019.

The pre-season featured games in China, the Philippines and the United States, and featured the NBLxNBA 2019 Tour in which five NBL teams played a total of seven games.

== Games ==
=== 2019 NBL China Tour ===
19 June 2019	China	89–77 (Series: China leads series, 1–0)	(Australia) NBL Select Team	Guoxin Gymnasium, Qingdao, China
19:30	Scoring by quarter: 19–23, 28–16, 21–19, 21–19
Fox Sports		report		Attendance: not available Referees: not available

21 June 2019	China	101–98 (Series: China leads series, 2–0)	(Australia) NBL Select Team	Nantong Sports Exhibition Centre, Nantong, China
19:30	Scoring by quarter: 28–25, 19–29, 20–16, 34–28
Fox Sports		report		Attendance: not available Referees: not available

23 June 2019	China	74–86 (Series: China wins series, 2–1)	(Australia) NBL Select Team	Changzhou Olympic Sports Centre, Changzhou, China
19:30	Scoring by quarter: 18–32, 19–15, 21–21, 16–18
Fox Sports		report		Attendance: not available Referees: not available

China won the series 2–1.

=== Adelaide 36ers pre-season ===
23 August 2019	Philippines	92–83	(South Australia) Adelaide 36ers	Meralco Gym, Pasig, Philippines
18:00	Scoring by quarter: 25–16, 25–33, 23–19, 19–15
N/A		boxscore report		Attendance: closed indoors Referees: not available

25 August 2019	Philippines	75–85	(South Australia) Adelaide 36ers	Meralco Gym, Pasig, Philippines
18:00	Scoring by quarter: 13–29, 17–15, 18–23, 27–18
N/A		boxscore report		Attendance: closed indoors Referees: Michael Tolentino, Editha Botecario, Reynante Hufana

24 September 2019	Adelaide 36ers	93–67	New Zealand Breakers	Titanium Security Arena, Adelaide
19:00	Scoring by quarter: 29–18, 22–19, 22–14, 20–16
N/A		boxscore report		Attendance: not available Referees: James Griguol, Hugh Starkey, Daniel Troy

27 September 2019	Adelaide 36ers	91–100	Melbourne United	Adelaide Entertainment Centre, Adelaide
19:00	Scoring by quarter: 27–29, 19–29, 19–21, 26–21
Facebook		boxscore broadcast report		Attendance: 5,000; Referees: Nathan Durant, James Griguol, Hugh Starkey

=== Brisbane Bullets pre-season ===
13 August 2019	Brisbane Bullets	79–107	Creighton Bluejays	NAB Stadium, Auchenflower
19:00	Scoring by quarter: 28–24, 14–30, 23–22, 14–31
YouTube		broadcast		Attendance: not available Referees: not available

27 September 2019	Brisbane Bullets	85–82	Perth Wildcats	USC Sports Stadium, Sunshine Coast
19:30	Scoring by quarter: 16–20, 34–22, 18–16, 17–24
Facebook		boxscore broadcast report		Attendance: not available Referees: Marc Mill, Jacquie Dover, Vaughan Mayberry

=== Cairns Taipans pre-season ===
7 August 2019	Cairns Taipans	85–76	California Baptist Lancers	Early Settler Stadium, Cairns
19:30	Scoring by quarter: 23–20, 19–21, 20–14, 23–21
N/A		boxscore report		Attendance: not available Referees: Nico Fernandes, Mark Mill, Alex McEwan

8 August 2019	Cairns Taipans	85–89	Creighton Bluejays	Early Settler Stadium, Cairns
20:30	Scoring by quarter: 29–13, 28–23, 11–31, 17–22
N/A		boxscore report		Attendance: 300; Referees: Nico Fernandes, Mark Mill, Alex McEwan

13 September 2019	Cairns Taipans	104–66	Brisbane Bullets	Early Settler Stadium, Cairns
19:30	Scoring by quarter: 23–12, 33–23, 20–21, 28–10
N/A		boxscore report		Attendance: not available Referees: Vaughan Mayberry, Marc Mill, Alex McEwan

15 September 2019	Cairns Taipans	76–66	Brisbane Bullets	Early Settler Stadium, Cairns
14:00	Scoring by quarter: 24–19, 25–18, 14–14, 13–15
N/A		boxscore report		Attendance: not available Referees: Toni Caldwell, Marc Mill, Jacqui Dover

=== Illawarra Hawks pre-season ===
7 September 2019	Illawarra Hawks	110–87	Indigenous All Stars	Illawarra Basketball Stadium, Gwynneville
19:30	Scoring by quarter: 36–27, 26–18, 24–21, 24–21
N/A		boxscore report		Attendance: 1,025; Referees: Toni Caldwell, Haylee Cole, Logan Bilbey

29 September 2019	Illawarra Hawks	96–106	Sydney Kings	WIN Entertainment Centre, Wollongong
15:00	Scoring by quarter: 22–32, 25–25, 29–26, 20–23
Facebook		boxscore broadcast report		Attendance: 2,252; Referees: Scott Becker, Guy Richards, Mitch Hare

=== Melbourne United pre-season ===
6 August 2019	Melbourne United	78–79	California Baptist Lancers	Melbourne Sports and Aquatic Centre, Albert Park
10:00	Scoring by quarter: 21–19, 13–19, 20–21, 24–20
N/A		boxscore report		Attendance: closed indoors Referees: Brad Henshaw, Elliot Green, Reuben Willcock

18 August 2019	Melbourne United	97–77	Zhejiang Lions	Melbourne Sports and Aquatic Centre, Albert Park
14:00	Scoring by quarter: 20–27, 20–18, 21–22, 36–10
N/A		boxscore report		Attendance: not available Referees: Jon Chapman, Chris Reed, Elliot Green

3 September 2019	Melbourne United	111–66	Shanxi Loongs	State Basketball Centre, Wantirna South
19:30	Scoring by quarter: 24–19, 21–13, 29–17, 37–17
N/A		boxscore report		Attendance: not available Referees: Damian Lyons, Jon Chapman, Mitch Hare

6 September 2019	Melbourne United	104–88	Cairns Taipans	Casey Basketball Stadium, Cranbourne
19:30	Scoring by quarter: 29–20, 27–20, 23–27, 25–21
Facebook		boxscore broadcast report		Attendance: not available Referees: Jon Chapman, Ruben Woolcock, Daniel Battye

8 September 2019	Melbourne United	80–102	Brisbane Bullets	Melbourne Sports and Aquatic Centre, Albert Park
14:00	Scoring by quarter: 23–19, 23–30, 20–30, 14–23
Facebook		boxscore broadcast report		Attendance: not available Referees: Damian Lyons, Jon Chapman, David Baddock

13 September 2019	Melbourne United	111–70	Illawarra Hawks	Ballarat Sports Events Centre, Ballarat
19:30	Scoring by quarter: 36–18, 26–18, 32–18, 17–16
Facebook		boxscore broadcast report		Attendance: not available Referees: not available

25 September 2019	Melbourne United	90–92	Perth Wildcats	Geelong Arena, Geelong
19:30	Scoring by quarter: 23–19, 20–18, 30–30, 17–25
YouTube		boxscore broadcast report		Attendance: 1,600; Referees: Chris Reid, Daniel Battye, Ruben Woolcock

=== Perth Wildcats pre-season ===
4 September 2019	Perth Wildcats	84–90 (Series: Adelaide leads series, 1–0)	Adelaide 36ers	Mandurah Aquatic & Recreation Centre, Mandurah
18:30	Scoring by quarter: 25–23, 23–29, 22–22, 14–16
N/A		boxscore report		Attendance: 650; Referees: Mark Grist, Steve Diconza, Craig Copes

6 September 2019	Perth Wildcats	100–98 (Series: Series tied, 1–1)	Adelaide 36ers	South West Sports Centre, Bunbury
18:30	Scoring by quarter: 27–19, 17–23, 28–31, 28–25
N/A		boxscore report		Attendance: 300; Referees: Craig Copes, Mark Grist, Travis Stewart

8 September 2019	Perth Wildcats	77–83 (Series: Adelaide wins series, 2–1)	Adelaide 36ers	HBF Arena, Joondalup
13:00	Scoring by quarter: 25–23, 22–29, 14–17, 16–14
N/A		boxscore report		Attendance: not available Referees: Craig Copes, Mark Grist, Travis Stewart

=== South East Melbourne Phoenix pre-season ===
30 May 2019	Jiangsu Dragons	73–92	South East Melbourne Phoenix	Wutaishan Gymnasium, Nanjing, China
19:30	Scoring by quarter: 19–22, 18–28, 16–21, 20–21
N/A		report		Attendance: not available Referees: not available

1 June 2019	Shanghai Sharks	76–71	South East Melbourne Phoenix	Yuanshen Sports Centre Stadium, Shanghai, China
19:30	Scoring by quarter: 8–21, 25–17, 19–20, 24–13
N/A		report		Attendance: not available Referees: not available

25 August 2019	South East Melbourne Phoenix	90–78	Zhejiang Lions	State Basketball Centre, Wantirna South
14:00	Scoring by quarter: 24–19, 24–21, 24–19, 18–19
N/A		boxscore report		Attendance: 460; Referees: Damian Lyons, Daniel Battye, Elliot Green

4 September 2019	South East Melbourne Phoenix	102–106(OT)	Cairns Taipans	State Basketball Centre, Wantirna South
19:30	Scoring by quarter: 23–24, 28–30, 21–12, 18–24, Overtime: 12–16
N/A		boxscore report		Attendance: not available Referees: Chris Reid, Daniel Battye, Ruben Woolcock

6 September 2019	South East Melbourne Phoenix	85–80	Brisbane Bullets	Traralgon Sports Stadium, Traralgon
19:30	Scoring by quarter: 31–24, 20–24, 19–11, 15–21
N/A		boxscore report		Attendance: not available Referees: Chris Reid, Damien Lyons, Elliot Green

8 September 2019	South East Melbourne Phoenix	93–80	Cairns Taipans	Kilsyth Basketball Stadium, Kilsyth
14:00	Scoring by quarter: 26–18, 19–25, 32–14, 16–23
Facebook		boxscore broadcast report		Attendance: not available Referees: not available

15 September 2019	South East Melbourne Phoenix	98–109	Illawarra Hawks	Lauren Jackson Sports Centre, Albury
12:00	Scoring by quarter: 20–28, 29–27, 20–24, 29–30
Facebook		boxscore broadcast report		Attendance: 1,000; Referees: Ruben Woolcock, Elliot Green, Andrew Hollowood

=== Sydney Kings pre-season ===
14 September 2019	Sydney Kings	109–67	Hills Hornets	Hills Basketball Centre, Sydney
19:00	Scoring by quarter: 22–17, 38–13, 21–13, 28–24
N/A		boxscore report		Attendance: 601; Referees: Richard Bai, Haylee Cole, Nathan Paff

26 September 2019	Sydney Kings	81–64	New Zealand Breakers	Sydney University Sports & Aquatic Centre, Sydney
19:00	Scoring by quarter: 20–15, 18–18, 23–18, 20–13
Facebook		boxscore broadcast report		Attendance: 891; Referees: James Boyers, Guy Richards, Haylee Cole

=== NBL Blitz Tasmania ===
The NBL Blitz is an annual pre-season tournament featuring all nine NBL teams and a new NBL1 All Stars team from the NBL1 semi professional basketball league. This season all games were held in Tasmania from the 19th to 22 September 2019 in Hobart, Ulverstone, Launceston and Devonport. Derwent Entertainment Centre hosted the Three-Point Shootout and Dunk Contest on the 22nd. The Brisbane Bullets won the tournament and received the seventh annual Loggins-Bruton Cup.

==== Day 1 Ulverstone ====
19 September 2019	Brisbane Bullets	106–57	NBL1 All Stars	Ulverstone Sports & Leisure Centre, Ulverstone, Tasmania
18:00	Scoring by quarter: 27–13, 27–14, 29–12, 23–18
Facebook, Twitch	Pts: Singler 19; Rebs: Braun 8 Asts: Patterson 10	boxscore broadcast report	Pts: Turner 14; Rebs: Swetalla 7 Asts: Doyle 4	Attendance: 1,300; Referees: Chris Copes, Nathan Durant, Marc Mill

19 September 2019	Cairns Taipans	100–99	Adelaide 36ers	Ulverstone Sports & Leisure Centre, Ulverstone, Tasmania
20:00	Scoring by quarter: 19–22, 27–19, 34–27, 20–30
Facebook, Twitch	Pts: Newbill 18; Rebs: Jawai 7 Asts: Machado 7	boxscore broadcast report	Pts: Johnson 27; Rebs: Froling 7 Asts: Taylor 4	Attendance: 1,300; Referees: Jon Chapman, Nico Fernandez, Travis Stewart

==== Day 2 Kingborough & Devonport ====
20 September 2019	Illawarra Hawks	122–119(OT)	Perth Wildcats	Kingborough Sports Centre, Hobart, Tasmania
18:00	Scoring by quarter: 20–35, 34–22, 25–22, 29–29, Overtime: 14–11
Facebook, Twitch	Pts: Blanchfield 24; Rebs: Ball 13; Asts: Ball, Ogilvy 7	boxscore broadcast report	Pts: Cotton 27; Rebs: Cotton 6 Asts: Cotton 8	Attendance: 507; Referees: Vaughan Mayberry, Daniel Battye, Hugh Starkey

20 September 2019	South East Melbourne Phoenix	96–87	Sydney Kings	Devonport Recreation Centre, Devonport, Tasmania
19:30	Scoring by quarter: 26–21, 21–18, 26–24, 23–24
Facebook, Twitch	Pts: Roberson 31; Rebs: Pineau, Trist 6 Asts: Adnam, Roberson 4	boxscore broadcast report	Pts: Ware 19; Rebs: Tate 7 Asts: Bruce 4	Attendance: 1,005; Referees: Michael Aylen, James Griguol, Marc Mill

20 September 2019	Melbourne United	76–97	New Zealand Breakers	Kingborough Sports Centre, Hobart, Tasmania
20:00	Scoring by quarter: 17–26, 25–15, 24–31, 10–25
Facebook, Twitch	Pts: Long 24; Rebs: Long 8 Asts: Trimble 3	boxscore broadcast report	Pts: Webster 24; Rebs: Loe 7 Asts: Webster 5	Attendance: 432; Referees: Darren Lyons, Toni Caldwell, Ruben Woolcock

==== Day 3 Launceston ====
21 September 2019	Cairns Taipans	87–68	NBL1 All Stars	Silverdome, Launceston, Tasmania
17:30	Scoring by quarter: 23–16, 25–10, 19–27, 20–15
Facebook, Twitch	Pts: Noi 18; Rebs: Noi 10; Asts: Djeric 6	boxscore broadcast report	Pts: Turner 21; Rebs: Swetalla 10; Asts: Bezman 3	Attendance: 670; Referees: Craig Copes, Elliot Green, James Girguol

21 September 2019	Adelaide 36ers	85–92	Brisbane Bullets	Silverdome, Launceston, Tasmania
19:30	Scoring by quarter: 21–15, 25–25, 23–29, 16–23
Facebook, Twitch	Pts: Taylor 23; Rebs: Drmic 5 Asts: Moore 6	boxscore broadcast report	Pts: Patterson 20; Rebs: Hodgson 7 Asts: Patterson 8	Attendance: 1,588; Referees: Jon Chapman, Nico Fernando, Nathan Durant

==== Day 4 Hobart ====
22 September 2019	South East Melbourne Phoenix	102–95	New Zealand Breakers	Derwent Entertainment Centre, Hobart, Tasmania
10:00	Scoring by quarter: 23–25, 32–22, 23–28, 24–20
Facebook, Twitch	Pts: Wesley 23; Rebs: Madgen 9 Asts: Roberson 7	boxscore broadcast report	Pts: Hampton 20; Rebs: Hampton, Obekpa 5 Asts: Hopson 4	Attendance: 421; Referees: Vaughan Mayberry, Mark Grist, Daniel Troy

22 September 2019	Perth Wildcats	71–103	Sydney Kings	Derwent Entertainment Centre, Hobart, Tasmania
13:00	Scoring by quarter: 15–29, 24–28, 10–21, 21–25
Facebook, Twitch	Pts: Steindl 17; Rebs: Majok 12; Asts: Steindl 4	boxscore broadcast report	Pts: Louzada 29; Rebs: Hunter 10; Asts: Louzada, Moller, Ware 3	Attendance: 1,200; Referees: James Boyer, Toni Caldwell, Alex McEwan

22 September 2019	Melbourne United	110–91	Illawarra Hawks	Derwent Entertainment Centre, Hobart, Tasmania
16:00	Scoring by quarter: 31–25, 25–17, 29–26, 25–23
Facebook, Twitch	Pts: Prather 23; Rebs: Long 11; Asts: Ili 5	boxscore broadcast report	Pts: Glover 17; Rebs: Coenraad 6 Asts: Naar 6	Attendance: 1,200; Referees: Damien Lyons, Daniel Battye, Ruben Woolcock

The Brisbane Bullets won the 2019 NBL Blitz championship.

=== NBLxNBA 2019 Tour ===
5 October 2019	(South Australia) Adelaide 36ers	81–133	(United States) Utah Jazz	Vivint Smart Home Arena, Salt Lake City, United States
19:00	Scoring by quarter: 18–28, 21–32, 24–44, 18–29
SBS on Demand	Pts: Randle 18; Rebs: Froling 11; Asts: Dillon 4	boxscore report	Pts: Bradley 18; Rebs: Bradley 10; Asts: Ingles, O'Neale 6	Attendance: 18,306; Referees: Derek Richardson, Ken Mauer, Phenizee Ransom

8 October 2019	New Zealand Breakers	94–108	(United States) Memphis Grizzlies	FedExForum, Memphis, United States
19:00	Scoring by quarter: 14–27, 22–28, 29–22, 29–31
SBS on Demand	Pts: Webster 19; Rebs: Hopson 8 Asts: Webster 8	boxscore report	Pts: Jackson Jr., Allen 18; Rebs: Clarke 12; Asts: Morant 10	Attendance: 10,259; Referees: Derrick Collins, Michael Smith, CJ Washington

10 October 2019	New Zealand Breakers	84–110	(United States) Oklahoma City Thunder	Chesapeake Energy Arena, Oklahoma City, United States
19:00	Scoring by quarter: 15–29, 20–33, 22–28, 27–20
SBS on Demand	Pts: Loe 19; Rebs: Hopson, Majok 6 Asts: Hampton, Henry 5	boxscore report	Pts: Adams 19; Rebs: Adams 10; Asts: Schroder 6	Attendance: not available Referees: Derrick Collins, Brett Nansel, Michael Smith

13 October 2019	(Victoria (state)) Melbourne United	100–118	(United States) Los Angeles Clippers	STAPLES Center, Los Angeles, United States
12:30	Scoring by quarter: 24–18, 27–29, 20–43, 29–28
SBS on Demand	Pts: Trimble 22; Rebs: Long 9 Asts: Trimble 6	boxscore report	Pts: Harrell 22; Rebs: Zubac 8 Asts: Williams 7	Attendance: 10,181; Referees: Brandon Adair, Tre Maddox, Bill Spooner

16 October 2019	(Victoria (state)) Melbourne United	110–124	(United States) Sacramento Kings	Golden 1 Center, Sacramento, United States
19:00	Scoring by quarter: 28–31, 21–29, 23–39, 38–25
SBS on Demand	Pts: Goulding 25; Rebs: Long 15; Asts: Trimble 6	boxscore report	Pts: Bagley III 30; Rebs: Bagley III 14; Asts: Ferrell, Hield 6	Attendance: 10,534; Referees: J.T. Orr, CJ Washington, Sean Wright

== Pre-season ladder ==
2019–20 NBL pre-season ladder
Ladder
Information

Pos.	Nat.	Name	Pld.	W.	L.	Last 5	Streak	Home	Away	For	Against	Pts %	Win %
1	(Australia)	Sydney	5	4	1	4–1	W3	1–0	3–1	486	394	123.35%	80.00%
2	(Australia)	Cairns	9	6	3	4–1	W4	3–1	3–2	811	763	106.29%	66.67%
3	(Australia)	S.E. Melbourne (NT)	9	6	3	4–1	W2	3–2	3–1	819	784	104.46%	66.67%
4	(Australia)	Melbourne	12	6	6	2–3	L2	4–3	2–3	1167	1095	106.58%	50.00%
5	(Australia)	Brisbane	8	4	4	3–2	W3	1–1	3–3	676	676	100.00%	50.00%
6	(Australia)	Illawarra	6	3	3	2–3	L2	1–1	2–2	598	631	94.77%	50.00%
7	(Australia)	Adelaide	10	4	6	1–4	L2	1–1	3–5	892	920	96.96%	40.00%
8	(Australia)	Perth (RC)	7	2	5	1–4	L1	1–2	1–3	625	671	93.14%	28.57%
9	(New Zealand)	New Zealand	6	1	5	0–5	L5	0–0	1–5	501	574	87.28%	16.67%

Total Rounds
11 weeks

Total Games
46 games

Legend
- (NT) New Team
- (RC) Reigning Champion

- Updated: 17 October 2019

=== NBL Blitz ladder ===
2019 NBL Blitz ladder
Ladder
Information

Pos.	Nat.	Name	Pld.	W.	L.	QW	Last 5	Streak	For	Against	Pts %	Win %	Pts.
1	(Australia)	Brisbane	2	2	0	6.5	2–0	W2	198	142	139.44%	100.00%	12.5
2	(Australia)	Cairns	2	2	0	5	2–0	W2	187	167	111.98%	100.00%	11
3	(Australia)	S.E. Melbourne (NT)	2	2	0	5	2–0	W2	198	182	108.79%	100.00%	11
4	(Australia)	Sydney	2	1	1	5	1–1	W1	190	167	113.77%	50.00%	8
5	(New Zealand)	New Zealand	2	1	1	5	1–1	L1	192	178	107.87%	50.00%	8
6	(Australia)	Melbourne	2	1	1	5	1–1	W1	186	188	98.94%	50.00%	8
7	(Australia)	Illawarra	2	1	1	1.5	1–1	L1	213	229	93.01%	50.00%	4.5
8	(Australia)	Adelaide (RC)	2	0	2	3.5	0–2	L2	184	192	95.83%	0.00%	3.5
9	(Australia)	Perth	2	0	2	2.5	0–2	L2	190	225	84.44%	0.00%	2.5
10	(Australia)	NBL1 All Stars (NT)	2	0	2	1	0–2	L2	125	193	64.77%	0.00%	1

Total Rounds
4 days
Games per Team
2
Total Games
10

Legend
- (NT) New Team
- (RC) Reigning Champion

- Updated: 22 September 2019
