= 2018–19 Cairns Taipans season =

- Head coach: Mike Kelly
- Captain: Alex Loughton
- Arena: Cairns Convention Centre

NBL results
- Record: 6–22 (21.4%)
- Ladder: 8th
- Finals finish: Did not qualify
- Stats at NBL.com.au

Uniforms
Home	Away
City Jersey	Blackout Jersey

The 2018–19 NBL season was the 20th season for the Cairns Taipans from Cairns in Queensland in the Australian National Basketball League (NBL).

== Roster ==
2018–19 Cairns Taipans roster
Players
Coaches

Pos.	No.	Nat.	Name	Ht.	Wt.
G	1	(United States)	Trimble, Melo (I)	1.91 m (6 ft 3 in)	88 kg (194 lb)
F	3	(Australia)	Young, Mitchell	2.06 m (6 ft 9 in)	107 kg (236 lb)
G	5	(United States)	Hall, Devon (I)	1.98 m (6 ft 6 in)	93 kg (205 lb)
G	6	(New Zealand)	Kenny, Jarrod	1.88 m (6 ft 2 in)	87 kg (192 lb)
G	7	(South Sudan)	Kuany, Kuany	2.01 m (6 ft 7 in)	91 kg (201 lb)
G	9	(Australia)	Kernich-Drew, Dexter	1.98 m (6 ft 6 in)	83 kg (183 lb)
F	10	(Australia)	Jurlina, Christian (DP)	1.96 m (6 ft 5 in)
F	12	(Australia)	Walker, Lucas	2.02 m (6 ft 8 in)	102 kg (225 lb)
C	14	(New Zealand)	Loe, Robert	2.11 m (6 ft 11 in)	111 kg (245 lb)
C	15	(Australia)	Jawai, Nathan	2.09 m (6 ft 10 in)	140 kg (309 lb)
F	20	(Australia)	Krslovic, Fabijan (DP)	2.03 m (6 ft 8 in)
G	25	(United States)	Newbill, D. J. (I)	1.93 m (6 ft 4 in)	95 kg (209 lb)
F/C	40	(Australia)	Loughton, Alex (C)	2.06 m (6 ft 9 in)	106 kg (234 lb)

Head coach

- (United States) Mike Kelly

Assistant coach(es)

- (Australia) Jamie O'Loughlin
- (Australia) Brad Hill

Legend

- (C) Team captain
- (DP) Development player
- (IN) Inactive
- (I) Import player
- (TP) Training player
- (NS) Next Star player
- Injured

- Roster
Updated: 13 October 2018

=== Depth chart ===
Pos.	Starting 5	Bench 1	Bench 2	Development
C	Nate Jawai	Rob Loe
PF	Alex Loughton	Lucas Walker	Mitchell Young	Fabijan Krslovic
SF	D. J. Newbill	Kuany Kuany		Christian Jurlina
SG	Melo Trimble	Devon Hall	Dexter Kernich-Drew
PG	Jarrod Kenny

== Pre-season ==
As part of their pre-season, the Taipans played eight pre-season games. Their first game was held in Cairns against Drexel University, the second in Rockhampton against the Brisbane Bullets and the following two games were against Melbourne United. As a club in the NBL they also took part in the NBL Blitz, and played games against the Sydney Kings, the Perth Wildcats and the New Zealand Breakers, however they opted out of the NBLxNBA games. To finish their pre-season they played a final game in Adelaide against the Adelaide 36ers.

=== Game log ===
2018–19 pre-season game log
Pre-Season: 3–1 (Home: 1–0; Road: 2–1)

Game	Date	Team	Score	High points	High rebounds	High assists	Location Attendance	Record
1	23 August	Drexel University	W 92-76	Not announced	Not announced	Not announced	Early Settler Stadium	1-0
2	31 August	@ Brisbane	W 74-95	Not announced	Not announced	Not announced	CQUniversity Community Sports Centre	2-0
3	11 September	@ Melbourne	L 89-88	Melo Trimble (19)	Nate Jawai (6)	Melo Trimble (6)	Dandenong Basketball Stadium	2-1
4	13 September	@ Melbourne	W 75-78	Not announced	Not announced	Not announced	Melbourne Sports and Aquatic Centre	3-1

NBL Blitz: 1–2 (Home: 0–0; Road: 1–2)

Game	Date	Team	Score	High points	High rebounds	High assists	Location Attendance	Record
1	20 September	Sydney	L 75-60	Devon Hall (20)	Devon Hall (9)	D. J. Newbill (3)	Bendigo Stadium	3-2
2	22 September	Perth	L 78-99	Melo Trimble (17)	Devon Hall (7)	Rob Loe, D. J. Newbill (3)	Ballarat Minerdome	3-3
3	23 September	New Zealand	W 89-96	D. J. Newbill (24)	Kuany Kuany (6)	D. J. Newbill, Melo Trimble (5)	Ballarat Minerdome	4-3

Pre-Season: 0–1 (Home: 0–0; Road: 0–1)

Game	Date	Team	Score	High points	High rebounds	High assists	Location Attendance	Record
5	25 September	@ Adelaide	L 99-75	Not announced	Not announced	Not announced	Titanium Security Arena	4-4

== Regular season ==
The regular season of the NBL consists of 28 games, with the Taipans' 14 home games to be played at the Cairns Convention Centre.

=== Standings ===
Pos	2018–19 NBL season											
Pos	Team	Pld	W	L	PCT	Last 5	Streak	Home	Away	PF	PA	PP
1	Perth Wildcats^{1}	28	18	10	64.29%	4–1	L1	12–2	6–8	2499	2355	106.11%
2	Melbourne United^{1}	28	18	10	64.29%	3–2	W1	10–4	8–6	2586	2478	104.36%
3	Sydney Kings^{1}	28	18	10	64.29%	4–1	W1	9–5	9–5	2438	2380	102.44%
4	Brisbane Bullets^{2}	28	14	14	50.00%	2–3	W1	9–5	5–9	2503	2480	100.93%
5	Adelaide 36ers^{2}	28	14	14	50.00%	2–3	L2	6–8	8–6	2687	2681	100.22%
6	New Zealand Breakers^{3}	28	12	16	42.86%	2–3	L1	7–7	5–9	2649	2641	100.30%
7	Illawarra Hawks^{3}	28	12	16	42.86%	1–4	L3	8–6	4–10	2493	2664	93.58%
8	Cairns Taipans	28	6	22	21.43%	2–3	L1	3–11	3–11	2400	2576	93.17%

Updated to match(es) played on 17 February 2019. Source: NBL.com.au

The NBL tie-breaker system as outlined in the NBL Rules and Regulations states that in the case of an identical win-loss record, the overall points percentage between the teams will determine order of seeding.

^{1}Perth Wildcats won on overall points percentage. Melbourne United finished 2nd on overall points percentage.

^{2}Brisbane Bullets won on overall points percentage.

^{3}New Zealand Breakers won on overall points percentage.

=== Ladder progression ===
- Numbers highlighted in green indicate that the team finished the round inside the top four.
- Numbers highlighted in blue indicates the team finished first on the ladder in that round.
- Numbers highlighted in red indicates the team finished last place on the ladder in that round.

2018–19 NBL season
Team	1	2	3	4	5	6	7	8	9	10	11	12	13	14	15	16	17	18
Adelaide 36ers	3	4	4	6	7	5	5	6	5	5	5	5	5	5	5	4	4	5
Brisbane Bullets	5	6	6	3	5	6	4	4	4	4	4	4	4	4	4	5	5	4
Cairns Taipans	2	3	8	8	8	8	8	8	8	8	8	8	8	8	8	8	8	8
Illawarra Hawks	8	7	7	7	6	7	7	5	6	6	6	7	6	6	6	6	6	7
Melbourne United	4	2	2	2	2	2	2	2	3	1	3	3	2	2	1	1	2	2
New Zealand Breakers	6	8	5	5	4	4	6	7	7	7	7	6	7	7	7	7	7	6
Perth Wildcats	1	1	1	1	1	1	1	1	1	3	2	2	3	3	2	2	1	1
Sydney Kings	7	5	3	4	3	3	3	3	2	2	1	1	1	1	3	3	3	3

=== Game log ===
2018–19 game log
October: 1–3 (Home: 0–2; Road: 1–1)

Game	Date	Team	Score	High points	High rebounds	High assists	Location Attendance	Record
1	13 October	@ Brisbane	W 70-88	Melo Trimble (32)	D. J. Newbill (10)	Devon Hall (6)	Brisbane Convention and Exhibition Centre	1-0
2	21 October	Illawarra	L 93-104	Melo Trimble (28)	Mitchell Young (7)	D. J. Newbill (7)	Cairns Convention Centre	1-1
3	26 October	Adelaide	L 83-91	Dexter Kernich-Drew (17)	Nate Jawai (9)	Dexter Kernich-Drew, Melo Trimble, Jarrod Kenny (3)	Cairns Convention Centre	1-2
4	28 October	@ Sydney	L 98-90	Melo Trimble (29)	D. J. Newbill (10)	Melo Trimble (8)	Qudos Bank Arena	1-3

November: 0–5 (Home: 0–2; Road: 0–3)

Game	Date	Team	Score	High points	High rebounds	High assists	Location Attendance	Record
5	3 November	Melbourne	L 85-98	Melo Trimble (34)	D. J. Newbill (9)	Melo Trimble (8)	Cairns Convention Centre	1-4
6	9 November	@ New Zealand	L 104-81	Melo Trimble (23)	Kuany Kuany, Rob Loe (6)	Melo Trimble (3)	Cairns Convention Centre	1-5
7	11 November	@ Melbourne	L 87-80	Melo Trimble (19)	Nate Jawai (10)	Melo Trimble, Jarrod Kenny (4)	Melbourne Arena	1-6
8	17 November	Perth	L 83-99	Melo Trimble, Devon Hall (18)	Melo Trimble (12)	Melo Trimble (7)	Cairns Convention Centre	1-7
9	23 November	@ Adelaide	L 109-95	Melo Trimble (23)	Rob Loe (6)	Devon Hall (6)	Titanium Security Arena	1-8

December: 0–6 (Home: 0–4; Road: 0–2)

Game	Date	Team	Score	High points	High rebounds	High assists	Location Attendance	Record
10	7 December	Illawarra	L 84-95	D. J. Newbill (21)	Devon Hall (9)	Melo Trimble, Nate Jawai (5)	Cairns Convention Centre	1-9
11	9 December	@ Perth	L 94-72	D. J. Newbill (17)	Nate Jawai (9)	D. J. Newbill (4)	RAC Arena	1-10
12	16 December	New Zealand	L 78-89	Melo Trimble (23)	Nate Jawai (9)	Melo Trimble (6)	Cairns Convention Centre	1-11
13	20 December	Sydney	L 70-81	Melo Trimble (14)	Nate Jawai (8)	Melo Trimble (7)	Cairns Convention Centre	1-12
14	22 December	@ Adelaide	L 87-82	Melo Trimble, Nate Jawai (18)	Nate Jawai (9)	Melo Trimble (6)	Titanium Security Arena	1-13
15	31 December	Perth	L 78-93	Melo Trimble (14)	Lucas Walker, Rob Loe (6)	Melo Trimble (4)	Cairns Convention Centre	1-14

January: 3–5 (Home: 2–2; Road: 1–3)

Game	Date	Team	Score	High points	High rebounds	High assists	Location Attendance	Record
16	3 January	Brisbane	W 109-80	Devon Hall (24)	Lucas Walker (8)	Devon Hall, D. J. Newbill (6)	Cairns Convention Centre	2-14
17	7 January	Sydney	L 82-86	Melo Trimble (22)	D. J. Newbill (9)	Nate Jawai (7)	Cairns Convention Centre	2-15
18	11 January	@ Perth	W 79-81	Melo Trimble (32)	Nate Jawai, Lucas Walker (8)	Nate Jawai (5)	RAC Arena	3-15
19	13 January	Melbourne	L 89-99	Melo Trimble (42)	Alex Loughton (8)	Melo Trimble, Devon Hall (2)	Cairns Convention Centre	3-16
20	19 January	@ Brisbane	L 99-68	Melo Trimble (23)	Rob Loe (7)	Devon Hall (3)	Brisbane Convention and Exhibition Centre	3-17
21	21 January	New Zealand	W 106-98	Melo Trimble (32)	Lucas Walker (8)	Melo Trimble, Rob Loe (5)	Cairns Convention Centre	4-17
22	24 January	@ New Zealand	L 113-106	D. J. Newbill (32)	Lucas Walker (9)	Melo Trimble (6)	TSB Stadium	4-18
23	26 January	@ Illawarra	L 82-81	Melo Trimble (24)	Alex Loughton (8)	D. J. Newbill (5)	WIN Entertainment Centre	4-19

February: 2–3 (Home: 1–1; Road: 1–2)

Game	Date	Team	Score	High points	High rebounds	High assists	Location Attendance	Record
24	2 February	Adelaide	L 91-100	Melo Trimble (21)	Devon Hall, Fabijan Krslovic (7)	Melo Trimble (4)	Cairns Convention Centre	4-20
25	4 February	@ Illawarra	L 110-95	D. J. Newbill (20)	Lucas Walker, Rob Loe (8)	Melo Trimble (11)	WIN Entertainment Centre	4-21
26	9 February	Brisbane	W 79-68	Melo Trimble (23)	Jarrod Kenny (7)	Devon Hall (5)	Cairns Convention Centre	5-21
27	14 February	@ Melbourne	W 85-87	Melo Trimble (21)	Rob Loe (10)	Melo Trimble (9)	Melbourne Arena	6-21
28	16 February	@ Sydney	L 89-84	Melo Trimble (21)	Melo Trimble (8)	Melo Trimble (5)	Qudos Bank Arena	6-22

== Player statistics ==
Updated: 1/9/2019

Player	#	Position	GP	GS	Min	Pts	FGM	FGA	FG%	2PM	2PA	3PM	3PA	3P%	FTM	FTA	FT%	RB	AS	ST	BL	TO
Devon Hall	6	SG	28	19	29	9.2	3.2	9.0	36	1.7	4.4	1.7	4.5	34	1.1	1.5	75	4.3	2.5	0.7	0.2	1.2
Nathan Jawai	15	PF/C	27	20	21	10.1	4.0	7.1	57	4.0	7.1	0.0	0.0	0	2.0	2.6	75	5.2	1.9	0.4	0.3	2.3
Christian Jurlina	10	SF	3	0	1	0.0	0.0	0.6	0	0.0	0.3	0.0	0.3	0	0.0	0.0	0	0.0	0.0	0.0	0.0	0.0
Jarrod Kenny	6	PG	28	9	18	4.9	1.7	4.2	41	0.7	2.0	0.9	2.1	44	0.4	0.6	72	2.4	1.7	0.3	0.0	0.9
Dexter Kernich-Drew	9	SG	18	2	11	3.1	1.0	3.3	30	0.2	1.3	0.7	2.0	35	0.5	0.6	83	1.3	0.6	0.3	0.1	0.3
Fabijan Krslovic	20	C	8	0	4	1.8	0.8	1.2	70	0.7	1.0	0.1	0.2	50	0.0	0.2	0	1.2	0.0	0.1	0.0	0.0
Kuany Kuany	7	SG	22	0	6	2.1	0.7	1.7	44	0.7	1.2	0.0	0.5	9	0.5	0.7	75	1.4	0.1	0.2	0.0	0.1
Robert Loe	14	C	28	14	19	7.6	2.8	6.3	45	2.0	3.7	0.7	2.5	31	1.1	1.6	70	5.0	1.3	0.4	0.7	0.8
Alex Loughton	40	PF/C	25	9	19	6.6	2.3	6.1	38	1.2	2.8	1.0	3.2	33	0.8	1.0	81	3.0	0.8	0.4	0.1	0.6
D. J. Newbill	25	SG	27	26	32	14.6	5.1	12.3	42	3.4	7.3	1.6	5.0	33	2.6	4.3	62	4.2	2.5	1.1	0.2	2.2
Melo Trimble	1	SG	28	28	34	22.5	7.3	16.2	45	4.6	9.7	2.7	6.5	42	5.0	6.0	83	3.6	4.6	1.2	0.1	3.2
Lucas Walker	12	PF	26	13	17	6.1	2.3	5.3	45	1.9	3.9	0.4	1.3	31	0.9	1.2	78	4.0	0.8	0.8	0.1	1.0
Mitchell Young	3,9	PF	23	0	8	1.9	0.7	1.6	47	0.7	1.5	0.0	0.0	0	0.3	0.6	64	1.7	0.2	0.2	0.2	0.4

== Awards ==
=== Most Valuable Player ===
Melo Trimble - "Melo Trimble was the clear choice for Taipans MVP this year, after breaking numerous club records and becoming the first player in over a decade to have at least 600 points, 100 rebounds, 100 assists and 50 made three-pointers in a regular season. The first-year import was also second in the NBL in scoring (22.6 points per game) third in assists (4.5 per game) seventh in three-pointers (43.1 per cent) and tied sixth for steals (1.2 per game)."

=== Coaches Award ===
Jarrod Kenny - "Selected by the coaches, the recipient of this award fulfils a variety of factors that they determine, whether that is the traits and values they bring to the team, their on-court efforts or their off-court contributions. This year, Jarrod Kenny was presented with the Coaches Award for bringing a competitive mentality and work ethic to training every day, while on game night he was consistently ready and was available to fill any role the team needed. Kenny is one of two players rostered for next season and alongside Rob Loe will return in the 2019/20 NBL season."

=== Best Defensive Player ===
D. J. Newbill - "DJ Newbill has been named Best Defensive Player by his club for two straight seasons now, after winning the same award with the New Zealand Breakers last year. Newbill often had the task of stopping some of the most lethal scorers the NBL, and proved to be a problem for opposition teams with his basketball IQ, strength, energy and quick hands. Newbill was also tied sixth in the NBL for steals, averaging 1.2 per game."

=== Member's Choice MVP ===
Melo Trimble - "As one of the many benefits of being a Taipans member, the Orange Army get the privilege for voting for their very own MVP and ensuring their favourite player gets recognised at the end of the season. Melo Trimble took out the Member's Choice MVP Award within an hour of voting being open, and the American gained the majority of votes from the 2018-19 Taipans members by a landslide."

=== Player's Player ===
Kuany Kuany - "Voted on by the playing group, each player confidentially provided a 3-2-1 vote for the best team mate throughout the season, with Kuany Kuany taking out the honour this season. Kuany is known for being the first to put his hand up to help, sticking to the team values, and always going the extra mile for his peers. His great attitude and warmth has made him a huge fan favourite in Cairns, with his outgoing personality and infectious energy a constant source of positivity for the Taipans."

=== Club Person of the Year ===
Anthony Fisher - "Previously awarded to a volunteer, part-time member of staff or external individual that contributes to the Taipans, Anthony Fisher became the first player to ever be named Club Person of the Year on Friday. As a training player, he was an integral part of the Taipans training squad throughout the 2018-19 season, focusing on improving his game and his team mates. He has also been recognised for actively engaged in the Cairns community through Taipans promotions, school visits and clinics at Cairns Basketball."

=== Commitment to Community ===
Nathan Jawai - "While all Taipans players and staff deliver a number of appearances, engagements and activities in the Cairns community, the Commitment to Community Award is presented to the player that goes above and beyond their Taipans duty. Nate Jawai took out this award for the second year in a row, thanks to his ongoing efforts with the Taipans Indigenous Program and Queensland Government commitments. Jawai continues to be a superstar in the local community and is extremely passionate about the work he conducts as an Indigenous role model."

== See also ==
- 2018–19 NBL season
- Cairns Taipans
