= George Blagojevic =

Australian basketball player

Melbourne Tigers
- Position: Power forward
- League: NBL1 South

Personal information
- Born: 18 October 1996 (age 30) Geelong, Victoria, Australia
- Listed height: 203 cm (6 ft 8 in)
- Listed weight: 100 kg (220 lb)

Career information
- College: Hartford (2015–2019)
- NBA draft: 2019: undrafted
- Playing career: 2014–present

Career history
- 2014–2015: BA Centre of Excellence
- 2019: Cairns Marlins
- 2019–2021: Cairns Taipans
- 2021–present: Geelong Supercats/United
- 2022: T71 Dudelange
- 2023: KK Dynamic
- 2026–present: Melbourne Tigers

Career highlights
- All-NBL1 South Second Team (2026); Second-team All-America East (2019)
Medals
Men's basketball
Representing Australia
Universiade
Bronze medal – third place	2019 Italy	Team

George Blagojevic (born 18 October 1996) is an Australian professional basketball player for the Melbourne Tigers of the NBL1 South. He played college basketball for the Hartford Hawks before playing two seasons for the Cairns Taipans in the National Basketball League (NBL) between 2019 and 2021.

== Early life and career ==
Blagojevic was born in Geelong, Victoria, in the suburb of Whittington. He later moved to Canberra to attend the Australian Institute of Sport (AIS). In 2014 and 2015, he played for the BA Centre of Excellence in the South East Australian Basketball League (SEABL).

== College career ==
In March 2015, Blagojevic committed to Hartford over Boise State, Saint Mary's and Grand Canyon.

Blagojevic averaged 9.5 points and 4.1 rebounds per game as a freshman. As a sophomore, his averages declined to 4.4 points and 3.0 rebounds per game. Blagojevic averaged 4.5 points and 3.7 assists per game as a junior. On February 27, 2019, he scored a career-high 32 points in a 96-76 win against Binghamton. As a senior, Blagojevic averaged 14.3 points, 7.5 rebounds, 1.9 assists and 1.2 steals per game. He was named to the Second Team All-America East. Blagojevic finished his career with 1,032 points and 578 rebounds.

== Professional career ==
In May 2019, Blagojevic signed with the Cairns Marlins of the Queensland Basketball League (QBL) for the remainder of the 2019 season. In 11 games, he averaged 12.3 points, 7.5 rebounds, 2.8 assists and 1.0 steals per game.

On 14 August 2019, Blagojevic signed a one-year deal with the Cairns Taipans of the National Basketball League (NBL). He re-signed with the team on 3 September 2020.

On 10 June 2021, Blagojevic signed with the Geelong Supercats of the NBL1 South for the rest of the 2021 season.

In January 2022, Blagojevic joined T71 Dudelange of the Luxembourg Basketball League for the rest of the 2021–22 season. In eight games, he averaged 16.5 points, 14.1 rebounds, 2.3 assists and 2.0 steals per game. He re-joined the Supercats for the 2022 NBL1 South season and then played for them again in the 2023 season.

Between October and December 2023, Blagojevic played 12 games for KK Dynamic of the Basketball League of Serbia, averaging 9.7 points, 4.8 rebounds, 2.3 assists and 1.4 steals per game.

Blagojevic re-joined Geelong, now known as Geelong United, for the 2024 NBL1 South season. He re-joined United for the 2025 season.

With the Melbourne Tigers in the 2026 NBL1 South season, Blagojevic was named All-NBL1 South Second Team.

== National team career ==
Blagojevic has represented Australia in several international tournaments. At the 2014 FIBA U18 Oceania Tournament, Blagojevic averaged 14.4 points, 6.6 rebounds, and 1.8 assists per game. He was named to the roster for the 2015 FIBA Under-19 World Championship. In 2019, he helped Australia win bronze at the Summer Universiade in Italy. Blagojevic averaged 5.3 points and 2.0 rebounds per game in six games.
