= Anthony Fisher (basketball, born 1994) =

Australian basketball player (born 1994)

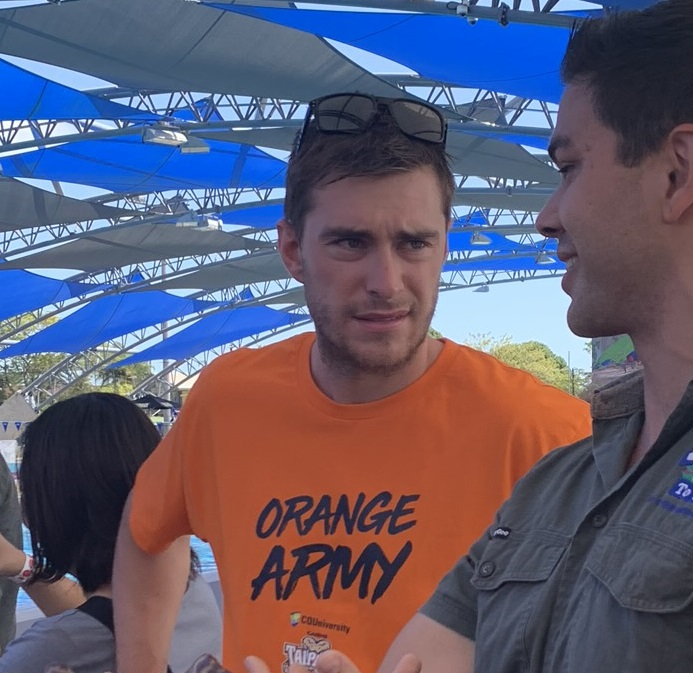
- Fisher in September 2019

Personal information
- Born: 24 January 1994 (age 32) Ballarat, Victoria, Australia
- Listed height: 187 cm (6 ft 2 in)
- Listed weight: 78 kg (172 lb)

Career information
- High school: Ballarat (Ballarat, Victoria)
- Playing career: 2011–2021
- Position: Point guard

Career history
- 2011–2015: Ballarat Miners
- 2014–2015: Perth Wildcats
- 2015–2020: Cairns Taipans
- 2016–2019; 2021: Cairns Marlins

Career highlights
- QBL champion (2016)
Medals
Men's basketball
Representing Australia
FIBA U18 Oceania Championship
Gold medal – first place	2012 Porirua	Team competition

Anthony Kane Fisher (born 24 January 1994) is an Australian former professional basketball player. He played the majority of his career in the South East Australian Basketball League (SEABL) and Queensland Basketball League (QBL), playing for the Ballarat Miners (2011–2015) and Cairns Marlins (2016–2019; 2021). He was a member of the Marlins' championship-winning team in 2016. He also had stints in the National Basketball League (NBL) with the Perth Wildcats and Cairns Taipans. After four years as a development player and extended squad member of the Taipans, he earned a full-time contract with the club in 2019.

== Early life ==
Fisher was born in Ballarat, Victoria. He started playing basketball locally at age 9 and then rose through the ranks of the Ballarat representative program.

On 1 December 2011, Fisher rejected an Australian Institute of Sport (AIS) scholarship to stay and complete his Victorian Certificate of Education (VCE) at Ballarat High School.

== Basketball career ==
=== Ballarat Miners and Perth Wildcats (2011–2015) ===
Fisher debuted for the Ballarat Miners in the South East Australian Basketball League (SEABL) in 2011 and continued in 2012 and 2013.

In September 2013, Fisher had a week-long trial with the Perth Wildcats of the National Basketball League (NBL), hoping to gain a development player spot. He was ultimately unsuccessful, but returned to Ballarat with a program put in place by the Wildcats to help him get stronger. In January 2014, Fisher returned to Perth for a two-week stint with the Wildcats, where on 17 January, he made his NBL debut by playing the final 50 seconds of the Wildcats' 97–72 win over the New Zealand Breakers.

With the Miners in 2014, Fisher averaged 14.3 points, 5.5 rebounds and 3.0 assists in 26 games.

On 7 August 2014, Fisher signed with the Perth Wildcats as a full-time development player. He appeared in eight games during the 2014–15 NBL season.

With the Miners in 2015, Fisher averaged 12.1 points, 6.0 rebounds and 2.4 assists in 25 games.

=== Cairns Taipans and Marlins (2015–2021) ===
On 10 September 2015, Fisher signed with the Cairns Taipans as a development player for the 2015–16 NBL season. He appeared in two games during the season.

Fisher joined the Cairns Marlins of the Queensland Basketball League (QBL) for the 2016 season. He helped the Marlins win the championship. In 19 games, he averaged 11.6 points, 6.2 rebounds and 3.6 assists per game.

Fisher re-joined the Taipans as a development player for the 2016–17 NBL season, where he again appeared in two games.

Fisher re-joined the Marlins for the 2017 QBL season. In 17 games, he averaged 13.29 points per game.

Fisher returned for a third season as a Taipans development player in 2017–18, and appeared in three games.

With the Marlins in 2018, Fisher helped the team reach the QBL Grand Final series and earned team MVP for the season. In 22 games, he averaged 18.1 points, 6.1 rebounds, 3.4 assists and 1.2 steals per game.

Fisher transitioned to a training player with the Taipans for the 2018–19 season, and was recognised for his commitment to the team by being named Club Person of the Year.

With the Marlins in 2019, Fisher averaged 16.5 points, 6.9 rebounds, 3.6 assists and 1.4 steals in 19 games.

On 13 August 2019, Fisher signed a full-time contract with the Taipans for the 2019–20 season. He scored 12 points in 15 games.

Fisher returned to the Marlins for the 2021 NBL1 North season.

== National team career ==
In 2012, Fisher represented Australia at the Albert Schweitzer Tournament and the FIBA Oceania Under-18 Championship. In 2013, he played for Australia at the FIBA Under-19 World Championship.
