= Lamar Patterson =

American basketball player (born 1991)

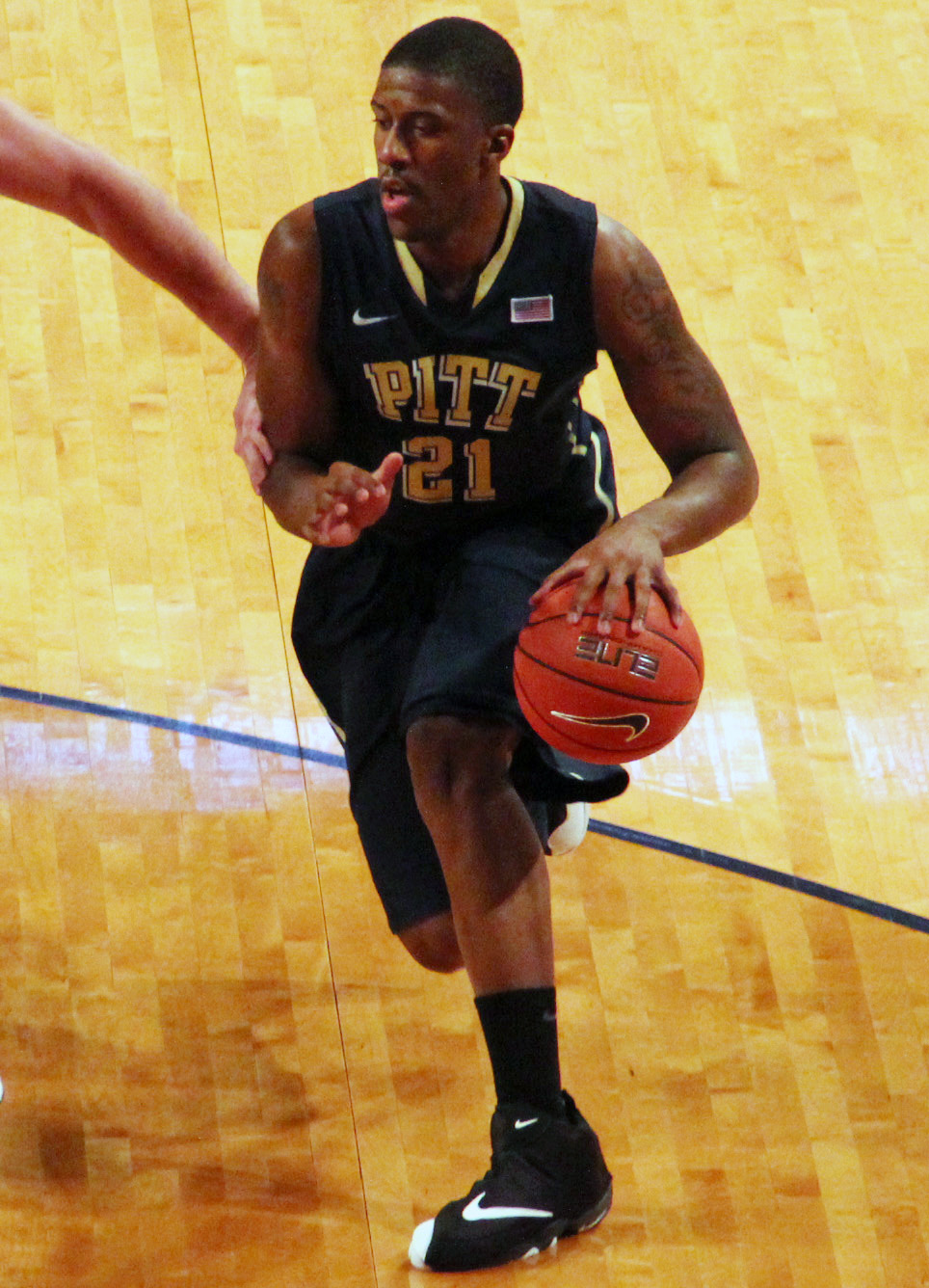
- Patterson with the Pittsburgh Panthers in 2014

No. 24 – Illawarra Hawks
- Position: Small forward / shooting guard
- League: NBL

Personal information
- Born: August 12, 1991 (age 35) Lancaster, Pennsylvania, U.S.
- Listed height: 6 ft 5 in (196 cm)
- Listed weight: 220 lb (100 kg)

Career information
- High school: McCaskey (Lancaster, Pennsylvania); Saint Benedict's (Newark, New Jersey)
- College: Pittsburgh (2009–2014)
- NBA draft: 2014: 2nd round, 48th overall pick
- Drafted by: Milwaukee Bucks
- Playing career: 2014–present

Career history
- 2014–2015: Tofaş
- 2015–2016: Atlanta Hawks
- 2015–2016: →Austin Spurs
- 2016: →Canton Charge
- 2016–2017: Reno Bighorns
- 2017: Atlanta Hawks
- 2017: Santeros de Aguada
- 2017–2018: Auxilium Torino
- 2018: Lhasa Pure Land
- 2018–2020: Brisbane Bullets
- 2019: Wuhan Dangdai
- 2020: Piratas de Quebradillas
- 2020–2021: New Zealand Breakers
- 2021–2022: Brisbane Bullets
- 2021: Southern Districts Spartans
- 2022: Gold Coast Rollers
- 2022: Cariduros de Fajardo
- 2023–2024: South West Metro Pirates
- 2025: Mumbai Titans
- 2025–2026: Ipswich Force
- 2025–2026: Brisbane Bullets
- 2026–present: Illawarra Hawks

Career highlights
- NBL1 North champion (2022); NBL1 North Most Valuable Player (2025); NBL1 North All Star First Team (2025); NBL1 North scoring champion (2025); NBL1 National Finals All-Star Five (2022); 2× All-NBL First Team (2019, 2020); NBL (China) scoring champion (2018); Italian Cup champion (2018); AP honorable mention All-American (2014); Second-team All-ACC (2014); CBI MVP (2012)
- Stats at NBA.com
- Stats at Basketball Reference

Lamar Alexander Lee Patterson (born August 12, 1991) is an American professional basketball player for the Illawarra Hawks of the Australian National Basketball League (NBL). He played college basketball for the Pittsburgh Panthers.

== College career ==
Patterson, a 6'5" swingman from Lancaster, Pennsylvania, starred at J. P. McCaskey High School, then Saint Benedict's Preparatory School in Newark, New Jersey. He chose to play college basketball for the Pitt Panthers. During his freshman year, he suffered an ankle injury in a game against Wichita State in November 2009 and missed the majority of the season, gaining a medical redshirt. Patterson returned to the court for the 2010–11 season and became a key rotation player for the Panthers. As a redshirt sophomore in 2011–12, Patterson became a starter and raised his scoring average from 2.6 points per game to 9.6. He finished the season on a high note, as he led the team to the 2012 College Basketball Invitational title. Patterson averaged 13.3 points, 6 rebounds and 4.5 assists per game for the tournament and was named MVP.

As a junior, Patterson helped lead the Panthers back to the NCAA tournament. Once there, however, Pitt lost to eventual Final Four participant Wichita State. Patterson returned for his senior season as the Panthers moved to the Atlantic Coast Conference. Patterson enjoyed a breakout season as he was one of the top players in the league, raising his scoring average to 17.1 from 10.0 as a junior. At the close of the season, Patterson was named second team All-ACC by both the league's coaches and media.

== Professional career ==
=== Tofas (2014–2015) ===
On June 26, 2014, Patterson was selected with the 48th overall pick in the 2014 NBA draft by the Milwaukee Bucks. He was later traded to the Atlanta Hawks on draft night. In July 2014, he joined the Hawks for the 2014 NBA Summer League. On August 5, 2014, he signed with Tofaş of the Turkish Basketball League (TBL). In 29 TBL games for Tofaş in 2014–15, he averaged 11.2 points, 3.4 rebounds, 2.2 assists and 1.0 steals per game.

=== Atlanta Hawks (2015–2016) ===
On July 24, 2015, Patterson signed with the Atlanta Hawks after averaging 13.1 points, 5.1 rebounds, 3.4 assists and 1.6 steals in seven Summer League games for the team. On October 27, 2015, he made his NBA debut, recording five points and two assists in a loss to the Detroit Pistons. During his rookie season, using the flexible assignment rule, Patterson received multiple assignments to the Austin Spurs and Canton Charge of the NBA Development League. On July 12, 2016, he was waived by the Hawks.

On July 15, 2016, Patterson was claimed off waivers by the Sacramento Kings. On October 19, 2016, he was waived by the Kings after appearing in four preseason games.

=== Reno Bighorns and Atlanta Hawks (2016–2017) ===
On October 31, 2016, Patterson was acquired by the Reno Bighorns of the NBA Development League as an affiliate player of the Kings. On January 29, 2017, Patterson signed a 10-day contract with the Atlanta Hawks, returning to the franchise for a second stint. On February 8, 2017, he signed a second 10-day contract with the Hawks. On February 18, 2017, after the second 10-day contract expired, Patterson returned to Reno. Six days later, Patterson signed a multi-year contract with the Hawks. However, on February 26, he was waived again; the team and Patterson agreed to his release to allow Patterson to address a personal matter. Two days later, he was reacquired by the Bighorns. On March 18, 2017, Patterson was waived by the Bighorns.

=== Santeros de Aguada (2017) ===
In June 2017, Patterson joined Puerto Rican team Santeros de Aguada. In 14 games, he averaged 15.8 points, 5.6 rebounds, 5.4 assists and 1.1 steals per game.

=== Auxilium Pallacanestro Torino (2017–2018) ===
On July 31, 2017, Patterson signed with Italian team Fiat Torino. In March 2018, he was released by Torino.

=== Lhasa Pure Land (2018) ===
On May 24, 2018, Patterson signed with Lhasa Pure Land of the Chinese NBL.

=== Brisbane Bullets and Wuhan Dangdai (2018–2020) ===
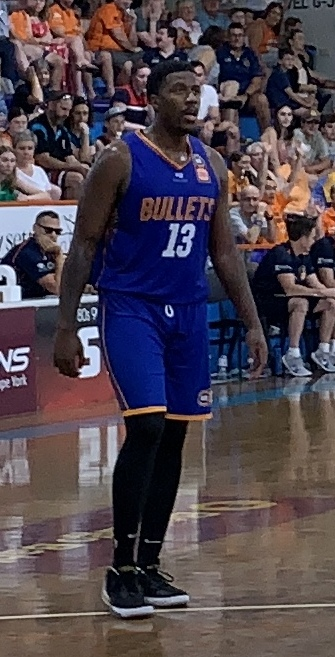
Patterson with the Brisbane Bullets in 2019

On October 31, 2018, Patterson signed with the Brisbane Bullets for the rest of the 2018–19 NBL season. He was named to the All-NBL First Team and averaged 17.8 points, 6.3 rebounds, 3.8 assists, and 1.3 steals, in 24 games.

In May 2019, Patterson returned to China to play for Wuhan Dangdai. In five games, he averaged 22.4 points, 6.4 rebounds and 4.2 assists per game.

On July 31, 2019, Patterson re-signed with the Brisbane Bullets for the 2019–20 NBL season. He was named to the All-NBL First Team.

=== Piratas de Quebradillas (2020) ===
On February 16, 2020, Patterson signed with Piratas de Quebradillas of the Baloncesto Superior Nacional. The season was suspended in March due to the COVID-19 pandemic; Patterson re-joined Quebradillas in October 2020 ahead of the season relaunch in November. He helped Quebradillas reach the BSN Finals, where they lost to Vaqueros de Bayamón.

=== New Zealand Breakers (2020–2021) ===
On August 4, 2020, Patterson signed with the New Zealand Breakers for the 2020–21 NBL season, returning to the Australian NBL for a third season. He struggled early for the Breakers and appeared out of prime playing condition. He averaged 10.8 points and 3.7 rebounds in six games—down from a career 18.7 points per game—and shot just 37 percent from the floor before going down with a knee injury that kept him out for the final seven games of the NBL Cup. He was released by the Breakers on March 16, 2021.

=== Brisbane Bullets, NBL1 and Puerto Rico (2021–2024) ===
On March 17, 2021, Patterson signed with the Brisbane Bullets for the rest of the 2020–21 NBL season. In his first game back for the Bullets on April 7, he fouled out in the third quarter with just four points in an 88–82 win over the Illawarra Hawks. In 17 games, he averaged 14.2 points, 4.8 rebounds, 3.0 assists and 1.5 steals per game.

Patterson played for the Southern Districts Spartans of the NBL1 North during the 2021 season.

On July 29, 2021, Patterson re-signed with the Bullets for the 2021–22 season.

Patterson joined the Gold Coast Rollers for the start of the 2022 NBL1 North season. He then had a brief six-game stint in Puerto Rico with Cariduros de Fajardo before re-joining the Rollers and helping them win the 2022 NBL North championship.

In December 2022, Patterson signed with the South West Metro Pirates for the 2023 NBL1 North season.

In November 2023, Patterson re-signed with the Pirates for the 2024 NBL1 North season.

=== Mumbai Titans (2025) ===
Patterson joined the Mumbai Titans of the Indian National Basketball League (INBL) for the 2025 season.

=== Ipswich Force and Brisbane Bullets (2025–2026) ===
In April 2025, Patterson signed with the Ipswich Force for the 2025 NBL1 North season. On June 27, he scored 45 points in a 98–86 win over the Mackay Meteors. On July 5, he had another 45-point game in a 130–125 overtime win over the Brisbane Capitals. He was named NBL1 North Most Valuable Player, NBL1 North All Star First Team, and NBL1 North scoring champion.

On September 10, 2025, Patterson signed with the Brisbane Bullets as a nominated replacement player for the 2025–26 NBL season, returning to the team for a third stint. Following the departure of Javon Freeman-Liberty, Patterson joined the playing group early in the season and played his 100th game for the Bullets on October 17 against Melbourne United. On November 13, he was elevated to the playing squad again following a season-ending injury to Casey Prather. Patterson went on to suffer a hamstring injury on November 20 against the South East Melbourne Phoenix, and later ruled out for the rest of the season on December 7.

In April 2026, Patterson re-signed with the Force for the 2026 NBL1 North season. In June 2026, he played in the same game as his son, 18-year-old Zaiden, who debuted in the NBL1 North for Ipswich. He helped the Force reach the NBL1 North grand final series, where they lost 2–0 to the Gold Coast Rollers despite Patterson's game highs of 32 points in game one and 40 points in game two.

=== Illawarra Hawks (2026–present) ===
On August 18, 2026, Patterson signed with the Illawarra Hawks on a one-year injury replacement deal.

== NBA career statistics ==
Legend
| GP | Games played | GS | Games started | MPG | Minutes per game |
| FG% | Field goal percentage | 3P% | 3-point field goal percentage | FT% | Free throw percentage |
| RPG | Rebounds per game | APG | Assists per game | SPG | Steals per game |
| BPG | Blocks per game | PPG | Points per game | **Bold** | Career high |

=== Regular season ===
| Year | Team | GP | GS | MPG | FG% | 3P% | FT% | RPG | APG | SPG | BPG | PPG |
|---|---|---|---|---|---|---|---|---|---|---|---|---|
| 2015–16 | Atlanta | **35** | 0 | **11.3** | **.350** | **.245** | **.727** | **1.4** | 1.1 | **.3** | **.1** | **2.4** |
| 2016–17 | Atlanta | 5 | 0 | 8.0 | .200 | .167 | .667 | **1.4** | **1.2** | .2 | .0 | 1.8 |
| Career | | 40 | 0 | 10.9 | .326 | .236 | .720 | 1.4 | 1.1 | .3 | .1 | 2.3 |

=== Playoffs ===
| Year | Team | GP | GS | MPG | FG% | 3P% | FT% | RPG | APG | SPG | BPG | PPG |
|---|---|---|---|---|---|---|---|---|---|---|---|---|
| 2016 | Atlanta | 4 | 0 | 5.0 | .286 | .333 | 1.000 | 1.3 | .8 | .3 | .0 | 1.5 |
| Career | | 4 | 0 | 5.0 | .286 | .333 | 1.000 | 1.3 | .8 | .3 | .0 | 1.5 |

== Personal life ==
Patterson has two sons.

In November 2026, Patterson passed his Australian citizenship test.

== See also ==
- List of NCAA Division I men's basketball players with 145 games played
