= Mirko Đerić =

Australian-Serbian basketball player

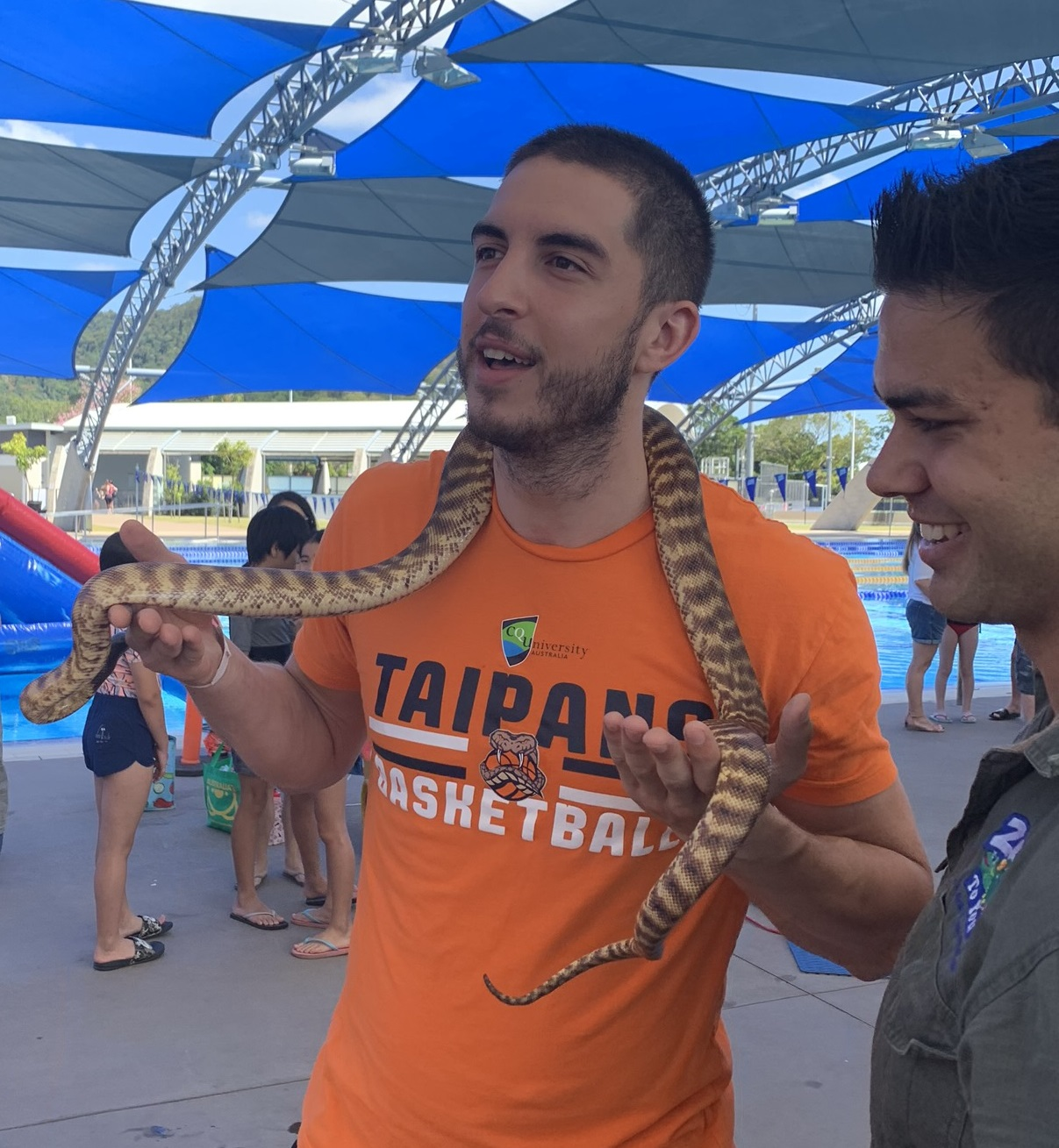
- Đerić in September 2019

KFUM Nässjö
- Position: Shooting guard / point guard
- League: Basketligan

Personal information
- Born: 17 April 1995 (age 31) Bankstown, New South Wales
- Listed height: 193 cm (6 ft 4 in)
- Listed weight: 94 kg (207 lb)

Career information
- NBA draft: 2017: undrafted
- Playing career: 2012–present

Career history
- 2012: Bankstown Bruins
- 2012–2013: Wollongong Hawks
- 2013–2015: Townsville Crocodiles
- 2015: Bankstown Bruins
- 2015–2016: Townsville Crocodiles
- 2016: Townsville Heat
- 2016: FMP
- 2016–2018: Vršac
- 2018–2019: Dynamic Belgrade
- 2019–2023: Cairns Taipans
- 2021: Cairns Marlins
- 2024-: KFUM Nässjö

Career highlights
- QBL Youth Player of the Year (2016)
Medals
Men's basketball
Representing Australia
U17 World Championship
Silver medal – second place	2012 Lithuania	Team

Mirko Đerić (Anglicized: Mirko Djeric; Serbian Cyrillic: Мирко Ђерић; born 17 April 1995) is an Australian-Serbian professional basketball player who plays for KFUM Nässjö of the Swedish Basketligan.

== Professional career ==
In 2011 and 2012, Djeric attended the Australian Institute of Sport (AIS) in Canberra.

Djeric started his career in 2012. He played for the Bankstown Bruins of the Waratah League, the NBL teams the Wollongong Hawks and the Townsville Crocodiles, and for the Townsville Heat of the Queensland Basketball League.

Prior to 2016–17 season, he signed for FMP of the Adriatic League. Later in 2016, he moved to Vršac of the Basketball League of Serbia. On 27 December 2017, he hit 9 three-pointers out of 11 attempts against Split.

On 30 May 2019, Djeric signed for the Cairns Taipans of the Australian NBL.

On 8 June 2021, Djeric joined the Cairns Marlins of the NBL1 North.

Djeric parted ways with the Taipans following the 2022–23 NBL season.

Djeric joined the Diamond Valley Eagles of the NBL1 South for the 2026 NBL1 season. He was the recipient of the NBL1 South Golden Hands Award.

== National team career ==
Djeric was a member of the Australia national under-17 basketball team that won the silver medal at the 2012 FIBA Under-17 World Championship. Over eight tournament games, he averaged 9.8 points, 2.0 rebounds and 5.6 assists per game.

== See also ==
- List of foreign basketball players in Serbia
