= D.J. Newbill =

American basketball player (born 1992)

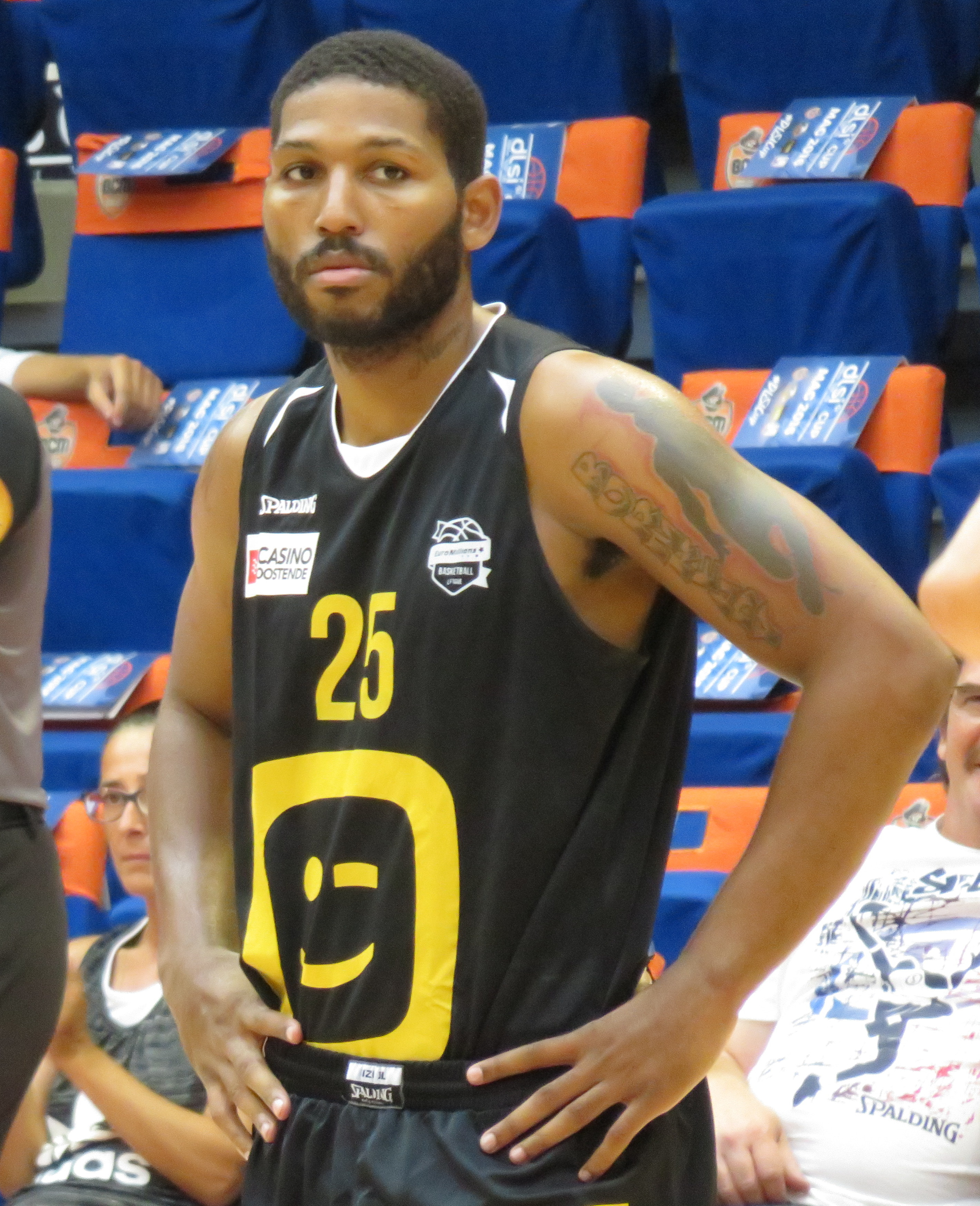
- Newbill with Telenet Oostende in 2016

No. 25 – Utsunomiya Brex
- Position: Shooting guard / point guard
- League: B.League

Personal information
- Born: May 22, 1992 (age 34) Philadelphia, Pennsylvania, U.S.
- Listed height: 6 ft 4 in (1.93 m)
- Listed weight: 210 lb (95 kg)

Career information
- High school: Strawberry Mansion (Philadelphia, Pennsylvania)
- College: Southern Miss (2010–2011); Penn State (2012–2015)
- NBA draft: 2015: undrafted
- Playing career: 2015–present

Career history
- 2015–2016: ASVEL
- 2016: Akhisar Belediyespor
- 2016–2017: Telenet Oostende
- 2017–2018: New Zealand Breakers
- 2018: Polski Cukier Toruń
- 2018–2020: Cairns Taipans
- 2019: Avtodor Saratov
- 2020–2023: Osaka Evessa
- 2023–present: Utsunomiya Brex

Career highlights
- B.League Champion (2025); 2× B.League MVP (2024, 2025); NBL Best Defensive Player (2020); All-NBL Second Team (2020); Belgian League champion (2017); Belgian Cup champion (2017); 2× Second-team All-Big Ten (2014, 2015); Conference USA All-Freshman Team (2011)

Devonte Jerrell Newbill (born May 22, 1992) is an American professional basketball player for Utsunomiya Brex of the Japanese B.League. He played college basketball for the Penn State Nittany Lions before playing professionally in France, Turkey, Belgium, New Zealand, Poland, Australia and Russia.

== High school career ==
Newbill attended Strawberry Mansion High School in Philadelphia. As a junior in 2008–09, he averaged 19.0 points, 7.0 rebounds, 4.0 assists and 3.0 steals per game and garnered Second Team All-State and All-Public League honors. As a senior in 2009–10, he was named the Pennsylvania Class AA Player of the Year and Public League Player of the Year after averaging 24.2 points, 9.0 rebounds, 5.0 assists and 4.0 steals per game. He led Strawberry Mansion to a 28–2 record and the Class AA State Championship.

=== Recruiting ===
College recruiting
Name	Hometown	School	Height	Weight	Commit date
D.J. Newbill; SG / PG	Philadelphia, Pennsylvania	Strawberry Mansion HS (PA)	6 ft 4 in (1.93 m)	210 lb (95 kg)	Sep 9, 2010
D.J. Newbill; SG / PG	Recruit ratings: Rivals: 247Sports: (88)				
Overall recruit ranking: Rivals: 111 (PG)
Note: In many cases, Scout, Rivals, 247Sports, On3, and ESPN may conflict in their listings of height and weight.; In these cases, the average was taken. ESPN grades are on a 100-point scale.; Sources: "2010 Player Commits". ESPN.; "2010 Team Ranking". Rivals.

== College career ==
=== Southern Miss ===
As a freshman at Southern Miss in 2010–11, Newbill ranked third on the Golden Eagle team posting 9.2 points and second with 6.2 rebounds per game for a veteran squad that posted a 22–10 mark. He started all 32 contests, playing 30.5 minutes per game while shooting 53.5 percent from the floor to earn Conference USA All-Freshman Team honors.

=== Penn State ===
In August 2011, Newbill transferred to Penn State. Due to NCAA transfer regulations, he was forced to sit out the 2011–12 season.

As a redshirt sophomore in 2012–13, Newbill was thrust into the role of point guard after an early season injury to Tim Frazier. As a result, Newbill led Penn State in scoring (16.3) and assists (4.0) and was second in rebounding (5.0) and steals (1.2). He was also named team captain in his first season. At the season's end, he was named an honorable-mention All-Big Ten selection. He became the 17th Lion to score 500 points (504) in a season. On January 16, 2013, he posted a career-high 27 points to go with six assists on 8-of-12 shooting against Michigan State.

As a junior in 2013–14, Newbill was named second-team All-Big Ten by coaches and media, becoming Penn State's 12th second-team selection and fourth picked by both entities. He was also a NABC Second Team All-District 7 member. He became Penn State's 31st 1,000-point scorer during the season and ranked 21st all-time in career scoring with 1,108 points at the season's end. He became the fourth Penn State player to reach 500-plus points in multiple campaigns. He led the team and was second in the Big Ten in scoring (17.8 ppg) and was second on team in rebounds (4.9 rpg). He scored the game-tying and game-winning field goals against Ohio State on January 29, 2014, ending night with a season-high tying 25 points, 17 of which were scored in the second half and overtime.

As a senior in 2014–15, Newbill was named second-team All-Big Ten for a second straight year. He also picked up USBWA All-District II Team, NABC All-District 7 Second Team and Big Ten All-Tournament Team honors. In 34 games, he averaged 20.7 points, 4.7 rebounds, 3.1 assists and 1.3 steals per game.

=== College statistics ===
Year	Team	GP	GS	MPG	FG%	3P%	FT%	RPG	APG	SPG	BPG	PPG
2010–11	Southern Miss	32	32	30.5	.535	.429	.690	6.2	1.6	.8	.1	9.2
2012–13	Penn State	31	31	36.5	.405	.267	.684	5.0	4.0	1.2	.3	16.3
2013–14	Penn State	34	34	34.4	.452	.326	.753	4.9	1.7	.8	.3	17.8
2014–15	Penn State	34	34	37.1	.450	.370	.758	4.7	3.1	1.3	.2	20.7
Career		131	124	34.7	.448	.337	.724	5.2	2.6	1.0	.2	16.1

== Professional career ==
In April 2015, prior to the 2015 NBA draft, Newbill competed in the Portsmouth Invitational Tournament and helped his team Cherry Bekaert win the championship while claiming Portsmouth Invitational All-Tournament Team honors.

After going undrafted in the 2015 NBA draft, Newbill joined the Los Angeles Clippers for the 2015 NBA Summer League. In four games for the Clippers, he averaged 10.3 points, 3.5 rebounds, 2.8 assists and 2.8 steals per game.

On July 29, 2015, Newbill signed with French team ASVEL for the 2015–16 season. On January 11, 2016, he parted ways with ASVEL. In 15 LNB Pro A games, he averaged 6.7 points, 1.7 rebounds and 1.8 assists per game. He also averaged 13.0 points, 2.3 rebounds, 2.4 assists and 1.0 steals in seven FIBA Europe Cup games.

In February 2016, Newbill signed with Turkish team Akhisar Belediyespor for the rest of the season. In eight games for Akhisar, he averaged 10.6 points, 4.8 rebounds, 2.6 assists and 1.5 steals per game.

On July 17, 2016, Newbill signed with Belgian team Telenet Oostende for the 2016–17 season. He helped Oostende win both the Belgian League championship and Belgian Cup crown; he also helped Oostende reach the final of the Belgian Supercup. In 45 league games, he averaged 8.4 points, 2.3 rebounds and 1.7 assists per game. He also averaged 8.0 points, 2.2 rebounds and 2.0 assists in six FIBA Europe Cup games, and 5.8 points, 1.6 rebounds and 1.5 assists in 14 BCL games.

On August 10, 2017, Newbill signed with the New Zealand Breakers for the 2017–18 NBL season. In 30 games, he averaged 13.8 points, 4.3 rebounds, 3.2 assists and 1.3 steals per game. In March 2018, he joined Polish team Polski Cukier Toruń.

On June 29, 2018, Newbill signed with the Cairns Taipans for the 2018–19 NBL season. In 27 games, he averaged 14.6 points, 4.2 rebounds, 2.5 assists and 1.2 steals per game. On February 26, 2019, he signed with Russian team Avtodor Saratov.

On August 17, 2019, Newbill re-signed with the Cairns Taipans for the 2019–20 NBL season. He was named to the All-NBL Second Team.

On August 21, 2020, Newbill signed with Osaka Evessa of the Japanese B.League.

On June 30, 2023, Newbill signed with Utsunomiya Brex.

== Career statistics ==
Legend
GP	Games played	GS	Games started	MPG	Minutes per game
FG%	Field-goal percentage	3P%	3-point field-goal percentage	FT%	Free-throw percentage
RPG	Rebounds per game	APG	Assists per game	SPG	Steals per game
BPG	Blocks per game	PPG	Points per game	PIR	Performance index rating
**Bold**	Career high

=== B.League ===
==== Regular season ====
Year	Team	GP	GS	MPG	FG%	3P%	FT%	RPG	APG	SPG	BPG	PPG
2020-21	Osaka	52	52	30.5	**.530**	**.446**	.798	3.8	5.9	1.2	.1	19.5
2021-22	Osaka	44	44	32.8	.491	.394	**.819**	5.3	5.0	1.3	.1	**23.0**
2022-23	Osaka	60	60	**33.4**	.481	.378	.754	4.2	5.5	1.3	.1	19.4
2023-24	Utsunomiya	**63**	**62**	28.8	.473	.373	.616	4.9	4.7	1.3	**.2**	16.5
2024-25	Utsunomiya	55	55	31.0	.479	.391	.721	**5.7**	**6.2**	**1.4**	.0	17.7
Career		274	273	31.2	.489	.394	.747	4.8	5.4	1.3	.1	19.0

Source: basketball-stats.de (Date: 02. February 2022)
