= Melo Trimble =

American basketball player

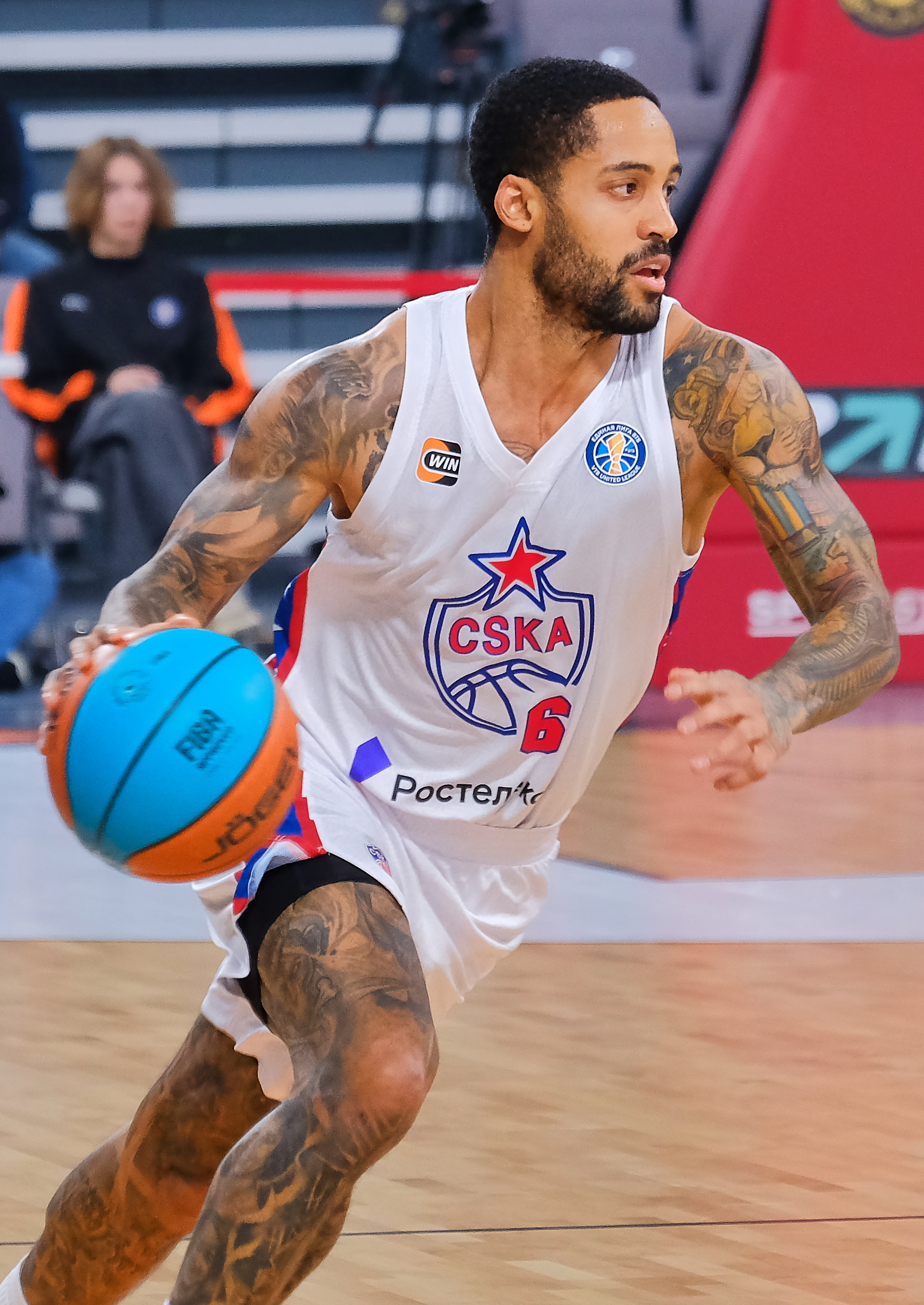
- Trimble with CSKA Moscow in 2025

No. 6 – PBC CSKA Moscow
- Position: Point guard
- League: VTB United League

Personal information
- Born: February 2, 1995 (age 31) Washington, D.C., U.S.
- Listed height: 6 ft 2 in (1.88 m)
- Listed weight: 190 lb (86 kg)

Career information
- High school: Bishop O'Connell (Arlington, Virginia)
- College: Maryland (2014–2017)
- NBA draft: 2017: undrafted
- Playing career: 2017–present

Career history
- 2017–2018: Iowa Wolves
- 2018–2019: Cairns Taipans
- 2019: Piratas de Quebradillas
- 2019–2020: Melbourne United
- 2020: Estudiantes
- 2020–2021: Fuenlabrada
- 2021–2022: Galatasaray Nef
- 2022–2023: Shanghai Sharks
- 2023–present: CSKA Moscow

Career highlights
- 3× VTB United League champion (2024–2026); VTB League Supercup winner (2024, 2025); VTB United League MVP (2026); 3× VTB United League Playoffs MVP (2024–2026); All-Liga ACB Second Team (2021); VTB United League Sixth Man of the Year (2024); VTB United League Supercup MVP (2025); All-NBL Second Team (2019); Second-team All-American – SN (2015); AP Honorable Mention All-American (2016); First-team All-Big Ten (2017); First-team All-Big Ten – Media (2015); Second-team All-Big Ten – Coaches (2015); Big Ten All-Freshman team (2015); McDonald's All-American (2014)
- Stats at Basketball Reference
Medals
Representing the United States
Pan American Games
Bronze medal – third place	2015 Toronto	National team

Romelo Delante Trimble (born February 2, 1995) is an American professional basketball player for CSKA Moscow of the VTB United League. He played at Bishop Denis J. O'Connell High School in Arlington, Virginia, where he was a McDonald's All-American. He played college basketball at the University of Maryland. He is considered to be one of Maryland's greatest point guards in recent history.

== College career ==
College recruiting
Name	Hometown	School	Height	Weight	Commit date
Romelo Trimble; SG	Upper Marlboro, MD	Bishop Denis J. O'Connell High School	6 ft 2 in (1.88 m)	175 lb (79 kg)	Dec 13, 2012
Romelo Trimble; SG	Recruit ratings: Scout: Rivals: 247Sports: ESPN:				
Overall recruit ranking: Scout: 29 Rivals: 39 247Sports: 31 ESPN: 29
Note: In many cases, Scout, Rivals, 247Sports, On3, and ESPN may conflict in their listings of height and weight.; In these cases, the average was taken. ESPN grades are on a 100-point scale.; Sources: "Maryland 2014 Basketball Commitments". Rivals.; "2014 Maryland Commits". Scout.; "ESPN". ESPN.; "Scout.com Team Recruiting Rankings". Scout.; "2014 Team Ranking". Rivals.; "Maryland 2014 Basketball Commits". 247Sports.

=== Maryland (2014–2017) ===
Trimble committed to play for Mark Turgeon's Maryland Terrapins in December 2012.

His performance as a freshman earned him a selection on the John R. Wooden Award mid-season Top 25. On January 17, 2015, Trimble scored 21 points and five three-pointers in the first half versus Michigan State. Trimble has scored 20 points or more in seven contests in his first season, with a career-high 31 points in a win over Arizona State.

On January 9, 2016, Trimble hit a game-winning three-point shot against Wisconsin, helping the Terps improve to 15–1 on the season, one of the best starts in school history. On February 1, 2016, he was named one of ten finalists for the Bob Cousy Point Guard of the Year Award. He was named to the 35-man mid-season watchlist for the Naismith Trophy on February 11.

Trimble returned to Maryland for his junior year. He hit a three-point shot with 1.1 seconds left in the Terps' final home game of the 2016–17 season to beat Michigan State 63–60, earning Maryland a tie for second place in the Big Ten after being picked 10th in the media's preseason poll. Trimble was named to the mid-season watchlist for the Naismith Trophy award for the second straight year, and he was unanimously named by the coaches to the All-Big Ten first team.

At the conclusion of his junior season, Trimble announced his intention to forgo his final season of collegiate eligibility and enter the 2017 NBA draft.

=== College statistics ===
Year	Team	GP	GS	MPG	FG%	3P%	FT%	RPG	APG	SPG	BPG	PPG
2014–15	Maryland	35	35	33.5	.444	.412	.863	3.9	3.0	1.3	.1	16.2
2015–16	Maryland	36	36	32.9	.410	.314	.863	3.6	4.9	1.3	.2	14.8
2016–17	Maryland	33	33	32.1	.436	.317	.789	3.6	3.7	1.1	.2	16.8
Career		104	104	32.8	.429	.343	.841	3.7	3.9	1.2	.1	15.9

== Professional career ==
Trimble worked out for nine NBA teams, including his hometown Washington Wizards, after the NBA Combine concluded. After going undrafted in 2017 NBA draft, Trimble joined the Philadelphia 76ers for the 2017 NBA Summer League. Trimble averaged 10.3 points per game in three games for the 76ers in the Summer League. On September 18, 2017, Trimble signed with the Minnesota Timberwolves. He was waived on October 14 as one of the team's final preseason roster cuts. He joined the Iowa Wolves in the NBA G League as an affiliate player. In July 2018, he played for the Chicago Bulls in the 2018 NBA Summer League.

On August 9, 2018, Trimble signed with the Cairns Taipans for the 2018–19 NBL season. In his debut for the Taipans on October 13, 2018, Trimble scored 32 points in an 88–70 win over the Brisbane Bullets, setting the most points scored by a Taipans player on debut. He played in all 28 games, finishing second in scoring after averaging 22.5 points along with 4.6 assists, 3.9 rebounds and 1.2 steals in 34 minutes of action per game. He subsequently earned All-NBL Second Team honors. Following the NBL season, he moved to Puerto Rico to play for Piratas de Quebradillas. In 26 games for Quebradillas, he averaged 17.4 points, 2.8 rebounds and 6.3 assists per game.

On April 26, 2019, Trimble signed with the Melbourne United for the 2019–20 NBL season. He appeared in all 31 games for United, averaging 19.9 points, 3.3 rebounds, 4.5 assists and 1.3 steals per game.

On March 11, 2020, Trimble signed with Estudiantes of the Spanish Liga ACB for the rest of the 2019–20 season.

On June 22, 2020, Trimble signed with Fuenlabrada for the 2020–21 ACB season.

On August 10, 2021, he signed with Galatasaray of the Turkish BSL.

On July 18, 2022, he signed with Shanghai Sharks of the Chinese Basketball Association (CBA).

On July 27, 2023, he signed with CSKA Moscow of the VTB United League.

== National team career ==
Trimble represented the United States national team at the 2015 Pan American Games, where he won a bronze medal.
