= 2020 NBL Finals =

Tournament details
- Country: Australia
- Dates: 28 February – 15 March
- Season: 2019–20
- Teams: 4
- Defending champions: Perth Wildcats

Final positions
- Champions: Perth Wildcats (10th title)
- Runners-up: Sydney Kings
- Semifinalists: Cairns Taipans; Melbourne United

Tournament statistics
- Matches played: 9
- Attendance: 66,000 (7,333 per match)
- Scoring leader(s): Bryce Cotton

Awards
- MVP: Bryce Cotton (Perth Wildcats)

The 2020 NBL Finals was the championship series of the 2019–20 NBL season and the conclusion of the season. The semi-finals started on 28 February and finished on 5 March 2020, with the following Grand Final starting on 8 March and being cancelled on 15 March 2020.

The Grand Final series was due to finish by 22 March 2020, however the COVID-19 pandemic forced the series to finish on 15 March 2020. The Perth Wildcats were leading 2–1 over the Sydney Kings in the best-of-five series when the remaining games were cancelled, which led the NBL to award Perth the title.

== Format ==
The finals was played in February and March 2020 between the top four teams of the regular season, consisting of two best-of-three semi-final and one best-of-five final series, where the higher seed hosts the first, third and fifth games.

=== Impact of the COVID-19 pandemic ===
Prior to Game 2 of the Grand Final, the NBL announced that the remainder of the Grand Final series would be played behind closed doors due to the COVID-19 pandemic, with only players, essential personnel and friends and family would be permitted to attend the remaining games. In the event of a player being diagnosed with COVID-19, the Grand Final series would be immediately suspended.

Following Game 3, the Sydney Kings informed the NBL that they did not wish to proceed with the remaining two games. Subsequently, the NBL decided to cancel Games 4 and 5. With the Perth Wildcats leading the series 2–1, the NBL announced that the Wildcats were declared the champions.

== Qualification ==
=== Qualified teams ===
| Team | Date of qualification | Round of qualification | Finals appearance | Previous appearance | Previous best performance |
|---|---|---|---|---|---|
| Sydney Kings | 24 January 2020 | 17 | 15th | 2019 | Champions (2003, 2004, 2005) |
| Perth Wildcats | 1 February 2020 | 18 | 34th | 2019 | Champions (1990, 1991, 1995, 2000, 2010, 2014, 2016, 2017, 2019) |
| Cairns Taipans | 8 February 2020 | 19 | 8th | 2017 | Runners-up (2011, 2015) |
| Melbourne United | 16 February 2020 | 20 | 25th | 2019 | Champions (1993, 1997, 2006, 2008, 2018) |

=== Ladder ===
| Pos | 2019–20 NBL season | | | | | | | | | | | |
| Pos | Team | Pld | W | L | PCT | Last 5 | Streak | Home | Away | PF | PA | PP |
|---|---|---|---|---|---|---|---|---|---|---|---|---|
| 1 | Sydney Kings | 28 | 20 | 8 | 71.43% | 4–1 | W2 | 12–2 | 8–6 | 2642 | 2472 | 106.88% |
| 2 | Perth Wildcats | 28 | 19 | 9 | 67.86% | 4–1 | W3 | 11–3 | 8–6 | 2529 | 2409 | 104.98% |
| 3 | Cairns Taipans | 28 | 16 | 12 | 57.14% | 3–2 | L2 | 11–3 | 5–9 | 2587 | 2547 | 101.57% |
| 4 | Melbourne United | 28 | 15 | 13 | 53.57% | 4–1 | W3 | 9–5 | 6–8 | 2638 | 2560 | 103.05% |
| 5 | Brisbane Bullets | 28 | 15 | 13 | 53.57% | 3–2 | W1 | 10–4 | 5–9 | 2607 | 2557 | 101.96% |
| 6 | New Zealand Breakers | 28 | 15 | 13 | 53.57% | 4–1 | W4 | 9–5 | 6–8 | 2514 | 2468 | 101.86% |
| 7 | Adelaide 36ers | 28 | 12 | 16 | 42.86% | 1–4 | L2 | 8–6 | 4–10 | 2654 | 2768 | 95.88% |
| 8 | S.E. Melbourne Phoenix | 28 | 9 | 19 | 32.14% | 0–5 | L8 | 6–8 | 3–11 | 2671 | 2761 | 96.74% |
| 9 | Illawarra Hawks | 28 | 5 | 23 | 17.86% | 0–5 | L10 | 3–11 | 2–12 | 2354 | 2654 | 88.70% |

Updated to match(es) played on 16 February 2020. Source: NBL.com.au

=== Ladder progression ===
- Numbers highlighted in green indicate that the team finished the round inside the top four.
- Numbers highlighted in blue indicates the team finished first on the ladder in that round.
- Numbers highlighted in red indicates the team finished last place on the ladder in that round.

2019–20 NBL season
| Team | 1 | 2 | 3 | 4 | 5 | 6 | 7 | 8 | 9 | 10 | 11 | 12 | 13 | 14 | 15 | 16 | 17 | 18 | 19 | 20 |
|---|---|---|---|---|---|---|---|---|---|---|---|---|---|---|---|---|---|---|---|---|
| Adelaide 36ers | – | 8 | 4 | 4 | 5 | 6 | 6 | 5 | 5 | 6 | 4 | 5 | 5 | 5 | 5 | 7 | 7 | 7 | 7 | 7 |
| Brisbane Bullets | 2 | 4 | 5 | 5 | 4 | 5 | 5 | 6 | 7 | 7 | 7 | 7 | 8 | 7 | 6 | 5 | 4 | 4 | 5 | 5 |
| Cairns Taipans | 7 | 7 | 6 | 6 | 8 | 8 | 7 | 7 | 6 | 4 | 6 | 4 | 4 | 4 | 3 | 3 | 3 | 3 | 3 | 3 |
| Illawarra Hawks | 6 | 5 | 7 | 9 | 9 | 9 | 9 | 8 | 9 | 9 | 9 | 9 | 9 | 9 | 9 | 9 | 9 | 9 | 9 | 9 |
| Melbourne United | 5 | 6 | 8 | 8 | 6 | 4 | 3 | 3 | 4 | 3 | 3 | 3 | 3 | 3 | 4 | 4 | 5 | 6 | 6 | 4 |
| New Zealand Breakers | – | – | 9 | 7 | 7 | 7 | 8 | 9 | 8 | 8 | 8 | 8 | 7 | 6 | 8 | 6 | 6 | 5 | 4 | 6 |
| Perth Wildcats | 4 | 2 | 3 | 2 | 2 | 3 | 2 | 2 | 2 | 2 | 2 | 2 | 2 | 2 | 2 | 2 | 2 | 2 | 2 | 2 |
| S.E. Melbourne Phoenix | 3 | 3 | 2 | 3 | 3 | 2 | 4 | 4 | 3 | 5 | 5 | 6 | 6 | 8 | 7 | 8 | 8 | 8 | 8 | 8 |
| Sydney Kings | 1 | 1 | 1 | 1 | 1 | 1 | 1 | 1 | 1 | 1 | 1 | 1 | 1 | 1 | 1 | 1 | 1 | 1 | 1 | 1 |

=== Seedings ===
1. Sydney Kings
2. Perth Wildcats
3. Cairns Taipans
4. Melbourne United

The NBL tie-breaker system as outlined in the NBL Rules and Regulations states that in the case of an identical win–loss record, the overall points percentage will determine order of seeding.

==== Playoff Bracket ====
Semifinals
1 | Sydney Kings | 86 | 80 | 89
4 | Melbourne United | 80 | 125 | 87
2 | Perth Wildcats | 108 | 74 | 93
3 | Cairns Taipans | 107 | 85 | 82

Grand Final
1 | Sydney Kings | 86 | 97 | 96
2 | Perth Wildcats | 88 | 83 | 111

== Semi-finals series ==
=== (2) Perth Wildcats vs. (3) Cairns Taipans ===
| 28 February 2020 | Perth Wildcats | 108–107(OT) (Series: Perth leads series, 1–0) | Cairns Taipans | RAC Arena, Perth, Western Australia |
| 18:30 | Scoring by quarter: 29–20, 16–34, 23–17, 25–22, Overtime: 15–14 |
| ESPN; SBS Viceland | Pts: Cotton 42; Rebs: Kay 9 Asts: Cotton, Kay 6 | boxscore broadcast report | Pts: Machado 32; Rebs: Oliver 18; Asts: Machado 9 | Attendance: 10,858; Referees: Vaughan Mayberry, Chris Reid, Nico Fernandes |

| 1 March 2020 | Cairns Taipans | 85–74 (Series: Series tied 1–1) | Perth Wildcats | Cairns Convention Centre, Cairns, Queensland |
| 16:00 | Scoring by quarter: 30–16, 17–15, 16–22, 22–21 |
| ESPN; SBS Viceland | Pts: Oliver 22; Rebs: Oliver 19; Asts: Machado 4 | boxscore broadcast report | Pts: Steindl 18; Rebs: Kay 10; Asts: Kay 4 | Attendance: 5,188; Referees: Vaughan Mayberry, Chris Reid, Nico Fernandes |

| 5 March 2020 | Perth Wildcats | 93–82 (Series: Perth wins series, 2–1) | Cairns Taipans | RAC Arena, Perth, Western Australia |
| 18:30 | Scoring by quarter: 25–24, 27–20, 24–22, 17–16 |
| ESPN; SBS Viceland | Pts: White 26; Rebs: Kay 12; Asts: Cotton 8 | boxscore broadcast report | Pts: Oliver 20; Rebs: Oliver 8 Asts: Machado 6 | Attendance: 10,215; Referees: Michael Aylen, Damien Lyons, Nico Fernandes |

==== Regular season series ====
Cairns won 2–1 in the regular season series:

| 18 October 2019 | Perth Wildcats | 76–99 | Cairns Taipans | RAC Arena, Perth, Western Australia |

| 23 November 2019 | Cairns Taipans | 91–84 | Perth Wildcats | Cairns Convention Centre, Cairns, Queensland |

| 12 December 2019 | Cairns Taipans | 84–88 | Perth Wildcats | Cairns Convention Centre, Cairns, Queensland |

=== (1) Sydney Kings vs. (4) Melbourne United ===
| 29 February 2020 | Sydney Kings | 86–80 (Series: Sydney leads series, 1–0) | Melbourne United | Qudos Bank Arena, Sydney, New South Wales |
| 19:30 | Scoring by quarter: 16–20, 21–23, 23–26, 26–11 |
| ESPN; SBS Viceland | Pts: Tate 23; Rebs: Bogut 10; Asts: Ware 5 | boxscore broadcast report | Pts: Trimble 34; Rebs: Long 11; Asts: Trimble 5 | Attendance: 13,103; Referees: Michael Aylen, Damien Lyons, James Boyer |

| 2 March 2020 | Melbourne United | 125–80 (Series: Series tied 1–1) | Sydney Kings | Melbourne Arena, Melbourne, Victoria |
| 19:30 | Scoring by quarter: 26–24, 32–7, 45–24, 22–25 |
| ESPN; SBS Viceland | Pts: Long 26; Rebs: Long 11; Asts: McCarron 5 | boxscore broadcast report | Pts: Tate 18; Rebs: Cooks 7 Asts: Louzada 2 | Attendance: 6,914; Referees: Michael Aylen, Vaughan Mayberry, James Boyer |

| 5 March 2020 | Sydney Kings | 89–87 (Series: Sydney wins series, 2–1) | Melbourne United | Qudos Bank Arena, Sydney, New South Wales |
| 19:30 | Scoring by quarter: 24–22, 20–28, 23–18, 21–19 |
| ESPN; SBS Viceland | Pts: Tate 20; Rebs: Cooks 9 Asts: Lisch 4 | boxscore broadcast report | Pts: Goulding 19; Rebs: Long 9 Asts: Ili 5 | Attendance: 8,075; Referees: Vaughan Mayberry, Chris Reid, James Boyer |

==== Regular season series ====
Sydney won 3–1 in the regular season series:

| 4 November 2019 | Melbourne United | 107–104 | Sydney Kings | Melbourne Arena, Melbourne, Victoria |

| 1 December 2019 | Sydney Kings | 111–101 | Melbourne United | Qudos Bank Arena, Sydney, New South Wales |

| 14 December 2019 | Melbourne United | 81–104 | Sydney Kings | Melbourne Arena, Melbourne, Victoria |

| 26 January 2020 | Sydney Kings | 106–88 | Melbourne United | Qudos Bank Arena, Sydney, New South Wales |

== Grand Final series ==
=== (1) Sydney Kings vs. (2) Perth Wildcats ===
| 8 March 2020 | Sydney Kings | 86–88 (Series: Perth leads series, 1–0) | Perth Wildcats | Qudos Bank Arena, Sydney, New South Wales |
| 5:00pm | Scoring by quarter: 26–24, 23–28, 24–16, 13–20 |
| ESPN; SBS Viceland | Pts: Bogut 18; Rebs: Bogut, Cooks 11; Asts: Ware 4 | boxscore broadcast report | Pts: Cotton 32; Rebs: Plumlee 7 Asts: Cotton, Norton 4 | Attendance: 11,647; Referees: Vaughan Mayberry, Michael Aylen, James Boyer |

| 13 March 2020 | Perth Wildcats | 83–97 (Series: Series tied 1–1) | Sydney Kings | RAC Arena, Perth, Western Australia |
| 6:30pm | Scoring by quarter: 27–31, 24–26, 22–19, 12–21 |
| ESPN; SBS Viceland | Pts: Cotton 27; Rebs: Plumlee 8 Asts: Cotton, Norton 3 | boxscore broadcast report | Pts: Tate 20; Rebs: Bogut 13; Asts: Newley 5 | Attendance: closed event Referees: Michael Aylen, Vaughan Mayberry, Chris Reid |

| 15 March 2020 | Sydney Kings | 96–111 (Series: Perth wins series, 2–1) | Perth Wildcats | Qudos Bank Arena, Sydney, New South Wales |
| 5:00pm | Scoring by quarter: 18–29, 28–27, 24–28, 26–27 |
| ESPN; SBS Viceland | Pts: Tate 20; Rebs: Cooks 9 Asts: Bogut, Bruce 3 | boxscore broadcast report | Pts: Cotton 31; Rebs: Kay 12; Asts: Cotton 7 | Attendance: closed event Referees: Vaughan Mayberry, Michael Aylen, Chris Reid |

Games 4 and 5 were cancelled and the Perth Wildcats declared champions after the Sydney Kings indicated they did not wish to proceed due to the COVID-19 pandemic.

== See also ==
- 2019–20 NBL season
