= 2019–20 Perth Wildcats season =

- NBL champions
- Head coach: (Australia) Trevor Gleeson
- Captain: (Australia) Damian Martin
- Arena: Perth Arena

NBL results
- Record: 19–9 (67.9%)
- Ladder: 2nd
- Finals finish: Champions (10th title) (Defeated Kings 2–1)
- Stats at NBL.com.au

Player records
- Points: (United States) Cotton 22.5
- Rebounds: (Australia) Kay 7.6
- Assists: (United States) Cotton 3.7

Uniforms
| Home | Away |
- All statistics correct as of 21 April 2020.

The 2019–20 NBL season was the 39th season for the Perth Wildcats in the NBL.

== Roster ==
2019–20 Perth Wildcats roster
Players
Coaches

| Pos. | No. | Nat. | Name | Ht. | Wt. |
|---|---|---|---|---|---|
| G | 2 | (Australia) | Pozoglou, Nic (DP) | 1.96 m (6 ft 5 in) | 97 kg (214 lb) |
| F | 3 | (Australia) | Kay, Nick | 2.06 m (6 ft 9 in) | 106 kg (234 lb) |
| G | 5 | (Australia) | Britt, Taylor (DP) | 1.88 m (6 ft 2 in) | 79 kg (174 lb) |
| G | 8 | (Australia) | Norton, Mitch | 1.86 m (6 ft 1 in) | 91 kg (201 lb) |
| G/F | 9 | (Australia) | Swaka Lo Buluk, Wani | 1.94 m (6 ft 4 in) | 87 kg (192 lb) |
| G/F | 10 | (Australia) | Travers, Luke (DP) | 2.01 m (6 ft 7 in) | 93 kg (205 lb) |
| G | 11 | (United States) | Cotton, Bryce (I) | 1.82 m (6 ft 0 in) | 75 kg (165 lb) |
| G | 12 | (Australia) | Reath, Chuatwech (DP) | 1.90 m (6 ft 3 in) |
| C | 18 | (United States) | Plumlee, Miles (I) | 2.11 m (6 ft 11 in) | 113 kg (249 lb) |
| F/C | 22 | (South Sudan) | Majok, Majok | 2.06 m (6 ft 9 in) | 111 kg (245 lb) |
| G | 23 | (United States) | White, Terrico (I) | 1.97 m (6 ft 6 in) | 95 kg (209 lb) |
| F | 24 | (Australia) | Wagstaff, Jesse | 2.03 m (6 ft 8 in) | 103 kg (227 lb) |
| F | 25 | (Australia) | Vague, Rhys | 2.06 m (6 ft 9 in) | 104 kg (229 lb) |
| G/F | 35 | (Australia) | Steindl, Clint | 2.00 m (6 ft 7 in) | 91 kg (201 lb) |
| G | 53 | (Australia) | Martin, Damian (C) | 1.86 m (6 ft 1 in) | 92 kg (203 lb) |

Head coach

- (Australia) Trevor Gleeson

Assistant coach(es)

- (United States) Scott Roth
- (Australia) Jacob Chance
- (Australia) Luke Brennan

Strength & conditioning coach(es)

- (Australia) Josh Cavanagh

Legend

- (C) Team captain
- (DP) Development player
- (IN) Inactive
- (I) Import player
- (TP) Training player
- (NS) Next Star player
- Injured

- Roster
Updated: 9 February 2020

=== Depth chart ===
| Pos. | Starting 5 | Bench 1 | Bench 2 | Development |
|---|---|---|---|---|
| C | Miles Plumlee | Majok Majok |
| PF | Nick Kay | Jesse Wagstaff | Rhys Vague | Luke Travers |
| SF | Terrico White | Clint Steindl | | Nic Pozoglou |
| SG | Bryce Cotton | Wani Swaka Lo Buluk | | Chuatwech Reath |
| PG | Damian Martin | Mitch Norton | | Taylor Britt |

== Preseason ==
The Wildcats pre-season included 4 regular pre-season games and 2 NBL Blitz games. Their first three games were held in Perth against the Adelaide 36ers. As a club in the NBL they also took part in the NBL Blitz and played games against the Illawarra Hawks and Melbourne United, which was followed by another pre-season game in Melbourne against Melbourne United. They decided to opt out of the NBLxNBA games in the United States.

=== Ladder ===
2019–20 NBL pre-season ladder
Ladder
Information

| Pos. | Nat. | Name | Pld. | W. | L. | Last 5 | Streak | Home | Away | For | Against | Pts % | Win % |
|---|---|---|---|---|---|---|---|---|---|---|---|---|---|
| 1 | (Australia) | Sydney | 5 | 4 | 1 | 4–1 | W3 | 1–0 | 3–1 | 486 | 394 | 123.35% | 80.00% |
| 2 | (Australia) | Cairns | 9 | 6 | 3 | 4–1 | W4 | 3–1 | 3–2 | 811 | 763 | 106.29% | 66.67% |
| 3 | (Australia) | S.E. Melbourne (NT) | 9 | 6 | 3 | 4–1 | W2 | 3–2 | 3–1 | 819 | 784 | 104.46% | 66.67% |
| 4 | (Australia) | Melbourne | 12 | 6 | 6 | 2–3 | L2 | 4–3 | 2–3 | 1167 | 1095 | 106.58% | 50.00% |
| 5 | (Australia) | Brisbane | 8 | 4 | 4 | 3–2 | W3 | 1–1 | 3–3 | 676 | 676 | 100.00% | 50.00% |
| 6 | (Australia) | Illawarra | 6 | 3 | 3 | 2–3 | L2 | 1–1 | 2–2 | 598 | 631 | 94.77% | 50.00% |
| 7 | (Australia) | Adelaide | 10 | 4 | 6 | 1–4 | L2 | 1–1 | 3–5 | 892 | 920 | 96.96% | 40.00% |
| 8 | (Australia) | Perth (RC) | 7 | 2 | 5 | 1–4 | L1 | 1–2 | 1–3 | 625 | 671 | 93.14% | 28.57% |
| 9 | (New Zealand) | New Zealand | 6 | 1 | 5 | 0–5 | L5 | 0–0 | 1–5 | 501 | 574 | 87.28% | 16.67% |

Total Rounds
11 weeks

Total Games
46 games

Legend
- (NT) New Team
- (RC) Reigning Champion

- Updated: 17 October 2019

=== Game log ===
2019–20 game log
Pre-Season: 1–2 (Home: 1–2; Road: 0–0)

| Game | Date | Team | Score | High points | High rebounds | High assists | Location Attendance | Record |
|---|---|---|---|---|---|---|---|---|
| 1 | 4 September | Adelaide 36ers | L 84-90 | Bryce Cotton (23) | Rhys Vague (8) | Bryce Cotton (6) | Mandurah Aquatic & Recreation Centre | 0-1 |
| 2 | 6 September | Adelaide 36ers | W 100-98 | Rhys Vague (20) | Rhys Vague (7) | Damian Martin (6) | South West Sports Centre | 1-1 |
| 3 | 8 September | Adelaide 36ers | L 77-83 | Rhys Vague (16) | Majok Majok (8) | Mitchell Norton (6) | HBF Arena | 1-2 |

NBL Blitz: 0–2 (Home: 0–0; Road: 0–2)

| Game | Date | Team | Score | High points | High rebounds | High assists | Location Attendance | Record |
|---|---|---|---|---|---|---|---|---|
| 1 | 20 September | Illawarra Hawks | L 122-119 | Bryce Cotton (27) | Bryce Cotton (6) | Bryce Cotton (8) | Kingborough Sports Centre | 0-1 |
| 2 | 22 September | Melbourne United | L 71-103 | Clint Steindl (17) | Majok Majok (12) | Clint Steindl (4) | Derwent Entertainment Centre | 0-2 |

Pre-Season: 1–1 (Home: 0–0; Road: 1–1)

| Game | Date | Team | Score | High points | High rebounds | High assists | Location Attendance | Record |
|---|---|---|---|---|---|---|---|---|
| 4 | 25 September | @ Melbourne United | W 90-92 | Nick Kay (21) | Nic Pozoglou (9) | Bryce Cotton, Dario Hunt (6) | Geelong Arena | 2-2 |
| 5 | 27 September | @ Brisbane Bullets | L 85-82 | Clint Steindl (17) | Hunt, Kay, Majok (7) | Bryce Cotton, Damian Martin (3) | University of the Sunshine Coast | 2-3 |

== Regular season ==
=== Ladder ===
| Pos | 2019–20 NBL season | | | | | | | | | | | |
| Pos | Team | Pld | W | L | PCT | Last 5 | Streak | Home | Away | PF | PA | PP |
|---|---|---|---|---|---|---|---|---|---|---|---|---|
| 1 | Sydney Kings | 28 | 20 | 8 | 71.43% | 4–1 | W2 | 12–2 | 8–6 | 2642 | 2472 | 106.88% |
| 2 | Perth Wildcats | 28 | 19 | 9 | 67.86% | 4–1 | W3 | 11–3 | 8–6 | 2529 | 2409 | 104.98% |
| 3 | Cairns Taipans | 28 | 16 | 12 | 57.14% | 3–2 | L2 | 11–3 | 5–9 | 2587 | 2547 | 101.57% |
| 4 | Melbourne United | 28 | 15 | 13 | 53.57% | 4–1 | W3 | 9–5 | 6–8 | 2638 | 2560 | 103.05% |
| 5 | Brisbane Bullets | 28 | 15 | 13 | 53.57% | 3–2 | W1 | 10–4 | 5–9 | 2607 | 2557 | 101.96% |
| 6 | New Zealand Breakers | 28 | 15 | 13 | 53.57% | 4–1 | W4 | 9–5 | 6–8 | 2514 | 2468 | 101.86% |
| 7 | Adelaide 36ers | 28 | 12 | 16 | 42.86% | 1–4 | L2 | 8–6 | 4–10 | 2654 | 2768 | 95.88% |
| 8 | S.E. Melbourne Phoenix | 28 | 9 | 19 | 32.14% | 0–5 | L8 | 6–8 | 3–11 | 2671 | 2761 | 96.74% |
| 9 | Illawarra Hawks | 28 | 5 | 23 | 17.86% | 0–5 | L10 | 3–11 | 2–12 | 2354 | 2654 | 88.70% |

Updated to match(es) played on 16 February 2020. Source: NBL.com.au

=== Ladder progression ===
- Numbers highlighted in green indicate that the team finished the round inside the top four.
- Numbers highlighted in blue indicates the team finished first on the ladder in that round.
- Numbers highlighted in red indicates the team finished last place on the ladder in that round.

2019–20 NBL season
| Team | 1 | 2 | 3 | 4 | 5 | 6 | 7 | 8 | 9 | 10 | 11 | 12 | 13 | 14 | 15 | 16 | 17 | 18 | 19 | 20 |
|---|---|---|---|---|---|---|---|---|---|---|---|---|---|---|---|---|---|---|---|---|
| Adelaide 36ers | – | 8 | 4 | 4 | 5 | 6 | 6 | 5 | 5 | 6 | 4 | 5 | 5 | 5 | 5 | 7 | 7 | 7 | 7 | 7 |
| Brisbane Bullets | 2 | 4 | 5 | 5 | 4 | 5 | 5 | 6 | 7 | 7 | 7 | 7 | 8 | 7 | 6 | 5 | 4 | 4 | 5 | 5 |
| Cairns Taipans | 7 | 7 | 6 | 6 | 8 | 8 | 7 | 7 | 6 | 4 | 6 | 4 | 4 | 4 | 3 | 3 | 3 | 3 | 3 | 3 |
| Illawarra Hawks | 6 | 5 | 7 | 9 | 9 | 9 | 9 | 8 | 9 | 9 | 9 | 9 | 9 | 9 | 9 | 9 | 9 | 9 | 9 | 9 |
| Melbourne United | 5 | 6 | 8 | 8 | 6 | 4 | 3 | 3 | 4 | 3 | 3 | 3 | 3 | 3 | 4 | 4 | 5 | 6 | 6 | 4 |
| New Zealand Breakers | – | – | 9 | 7 | 7 | 7 | 8 | 9 | 8 | 8 | 8 | 8 | 7 | 6 | 8 | 6 | 6 | 5 | 4 | 6 |
| Perth Wildcats | 4 | 2 | 3 | 2 | 2 | 3 | 2 | 2 | 2 | 2 | 2 | 2 | 2 | 2 | 2 | 2 | 2 | 2 | 2 | 2 |
| S.E. Melbourne Phoenix | 3 | 3 | 2 | 3 | 3 | 2 | 4 | 4 | 3 | 5 | 5 | 6 | 6 | 8 | 7 | 8 | 8 | 8 | 8 | 8 |
| Sydney Kings | 1 | 1 | 1 | 1 | 1 | 1 | 1 | 1 | 1 | 1 | 1 | 1 | 1 | 1 | 1 | 1 | 1 | 1 | 1 | 1 |

=== Game log ===
The regular season of the NBL consists of 28 games, with the Wildcats' 14 home games to be played at RAC Arena.

2019–20 game log
October: 5–1 (Home: 3–1; Road: 2–0)

| Game | Date | Team | Score | High points | High rebounds | High assists | Location Attendance | Record |
|---|---|---|---|---|---|---|---|---|
| 1 | 5 October | Melbourne United | W 94-93 | Bryce Cotton (21) | Nick Kay (8) | Nick Kay (7) | RAC Arena | 1-0 |
| 2 | 11 October | Illawarra Hawks | W 103-76 | Bryce Cotton (28) | Dario Hunt (10) | Bryce Cotton (7) | RAC Arena | 2-0 |
| 3 | 18 October | Cairns Taipans | L 76-99 | Nick Kay, Terrico White (15) | Dario Hunt (8) | Damian Martin (6) | RAC Arena | 2-1 |
| 4 | 20 October | @ Melbourne United | W 93-95 | Bryce Cotton (28) | Nick Kay (8) | Dario Hunt (7) | Melbourne Arena | 3-1 |
| 5 | 25 October | South East Melbourne Phoenix | W 110-79 | Terrico White (17) | Nick Kay (13) | Bryce Cotton (8) | RAC Arena | 4-1 |
| 6 | 27 October | @ Illawarra Hawks | W 76-81 | Bryce Cotton (21) | Damian Martin (10) | Bryce Cotton, Damian Martin (4) | WIN Entertainment Centre | 5-1 |

November: 3–3 (Home: 1–0; Road: 2–3)

| Game | Date | Team | Score | High points | High rebounds | High assists | Location Attendance | Record |
|---|---|---|---|---|---|---|---|---|
| 7 | 1 November | @ Brisbane Bullets | L 87-78 | Terrico White (23) | Nick Kay (9) | Damian Martin (4) | Nissan Arena | 5-2 |
| 8 | 3 November | @ New Zealand Breakers | W 79-84 | Dario Hunt (21) | Dario Hunt (11) | Bryce Cotton (7) | iLT Stadium Southland | 6-2 |
| 9 | 10 November | @ Sydney Kings | L 104-85 | Bryce Cotton (36) | Dario Hunt (10) | Bryce Cotton, Dario Hunt (3) | Qudos Bank Arena | 6-3 |
| 10 | 15 November | @ Adelaide 36ers | W 95-99 | Nick Kay (21) | Nick Kay, Dario Hunt (8) | Nick Kay (5) | Adelaide Entertainment Centre | 7-3 |
| 11 | 17 November | New Zealand Breakers | W 88-77 | Bryce Cotton (34) | Nick Kay (8) | Damian Martin, Terrico White (5) | RAC Arena | 8-3 |
| 12 | 23 November | @ Cairns Taipans | L 91-84 | Clint Steindl 17 | Damian Martin 5 | Nick Kay, Damian Martin 4 | Cairns Convention Centre | 8-4 |

December: 5–2 (Home: 2–2; Road: 3–0)

| Game | Date | Team | Score | High points | High rebounds | High assists | Location Attendance | Record |
|---|---|---|---|---|---|---|---|---|
| 13 | 1 December | Adelaide 36ers | L 88-99 | Bryce Cotton (18) | Jesse Wagstaff (6) | Kay, Travers, Wagstaff (4) | RAC Arena | 8-5 |
| 14 | 6 December | Sydney Kings | W 96-77 | Bryce Cotton (27) | Nick Kay (13) | Bryce Cotton (4) | RAC Arena | 9-5 |
| 15 | 8 December | @ South East Melbourne Phoenix | W 98-108 | Bryce Cotton (26) | Nick Kay (12) | Damian Martin, Jesse Wagstaff (4) | Melbourne Arena | 10-5 |
| 16 | 12 December | @ Cairns Taipans | W 84-88 | Bryce Cotton (24) | Nick Kay (11) | Nick Kay (5) | Cairns Convention Centre | 11-5 |
| 17 | 14 December | Brisbane Bullets | W 86-78 | Bryce Cotton (23) | Damien Martin (8) | Mitch Norton (3) | RAC Arena | 12-5 |
| 18 | 21 December | Melbourne United | L 74-87 | Bryce Cotton (15) | Nick Kay (5) | Cotton, Martin, White (3) | RAC Arena | 12-6 |
| 19 | 28 December | @ Sydney Kings | W 85-98 | Bryce Cotton (39) | Nick Kay (10) | Dario Hunt (4) | Qudos Bank Arena | 13-6 |

January: 3–3 (Home: 2–0; Road: 1–3)

| Game | Date | Team | Score | High points | High rebounds | High assists | Location Attendance | Record |
|---|---|---|---|---|---|---|---|---|
| 20 | 1 January | @ Adelaide 36ers | L 100-97 | Bryce Cotton (22) | Majok Majok (10) | Bryce Cotton (4) | Adelaide Entertainment Centre | 13-7 |
| 21 | 5 January | @ Brisbane Bullets | L 97-85 | Bryce Cotton (24) | Bryce Cotton (6) | Nick Kay (4) | Nissan Arena | 13-8 |
| 22 | 10 January | @ Illawarra Hawks | W 77-99 | Bryce Cotton (23) | Nick Kay (10) | Bryce Cotton (6) | WIN Entertainment Centre | 14-8 |
| 23 | 17 January | South East Melbourne Phoenix | W 97-71 | Bryce Cotton (25) | Majok Majok (10) | Bryce Cotton (7) | RAC Arena | 15-8 |
| 24 | 25 January | New Zealand Breakers | W 90-89 | Bryce Cotton, Miles Plumlee (23) | Miles Plumlee (17) | Bryce Cotton, Mitch Norton (4) | RAC Arena | 16-8 |
| 25 | 29 January | @ Melbourne United | L 77-67 | Nick Kay (23) | Nick Kay (8) | Mitch Norton (4) | Melbourne Arena | 16-9 |

February: 2–0 (Home: 2–0; Road: 0–0)

| Game | Date | Team | Score | High points | High rebounds | High assists | Location Attendance | Record |
|---|---|---|---|---|---|---|---|---|
| 26 | 1 February | Sydney Kings | W 110-100 | Bryce Cotton (30) | Nick Kay (10) | Mitch Norton (5) | RAC Arena | 17-9 |
| 27 | 7 February | Brisbane Bullets | W 85-72 | Bryce Cotton (25) | Nick Kay (8) | Bryce Cotton, Nick Kay (5) | RAC Arena | 18-9 |
| 28 | 14 February | Adelaide 36ers | W 94-79 | Nick Kay (23) | Mitch Norton (8) | Mitch Norton (5) | RAC Arena | 19-9 |

== Postseason ==
2020 finals game log
Semifinals: 2–1 (Home: 2–0; Road: 0–1)

| Game | Date | Team | Score | High points | High rebounds | High assists | Location Attendance | Record |
|---|---|---|---|---|---|---|---|---|
| 1 | 28 February | Cairns Taipans | W 108-107 | Bryce Cotton (42) | Nick Kay (9) | Bryce Cotton, Nick Kay (6) | RAC Arena | 1-0 |
| 2 | 1 March | @ Cairns Taipans | L 85-74 | Clint Steindl (18) | Nick Kay (10) | Nick Kay (4) | Cairns Convention Centre | 1-1 |
| 3 | 5 March | Cairns Taipans | W 93-82 | Terrico White (26) | Nick Kay (12) | Bryce Cotton (8) | RAC Arena | 2-1 |

NBL Finals: 2–1 (Home: 0–1; Road: 2–0)

| Game | Date | Team | Score | High points | High rebounds | High assists | Location Attendance | Series |
|---|---|---|---|---|---|---|---|---|
| 1 | 8 March | @ Sydney Kings | W 86-88 | Bryce Cotton (32) | Miles Plumlee (7) | Bryce Cotton, Mitch Norton (4) | Qudos Bank Arena | 1-0 |
| 2 | 13 March | Sydney Kings | L 85-97 | Bryce Cotton 27 | Miles Plumlee 8 | Bryce Cotton, Mitch Norton 3 | RAC Arena | 1-1 |
| 3 | 15 March | @ Sydney Kings | W 96-111 | Bryce Cotton (31) | Nick Kay (12) | Bryce Cotton (7) | Qudos Bank Arena | 2-1 |

== Awards ==
=== Player of the Week ===
Round 2, Bryce Cotton

Round 10, Nick Kay

Round 17, Miles Plumlee

Round 18, Nick Kay

== See also ==
- 2019–20 NBL season
- Perth Wildcats
