= Sek Henry =

American-Jamaican basketball player

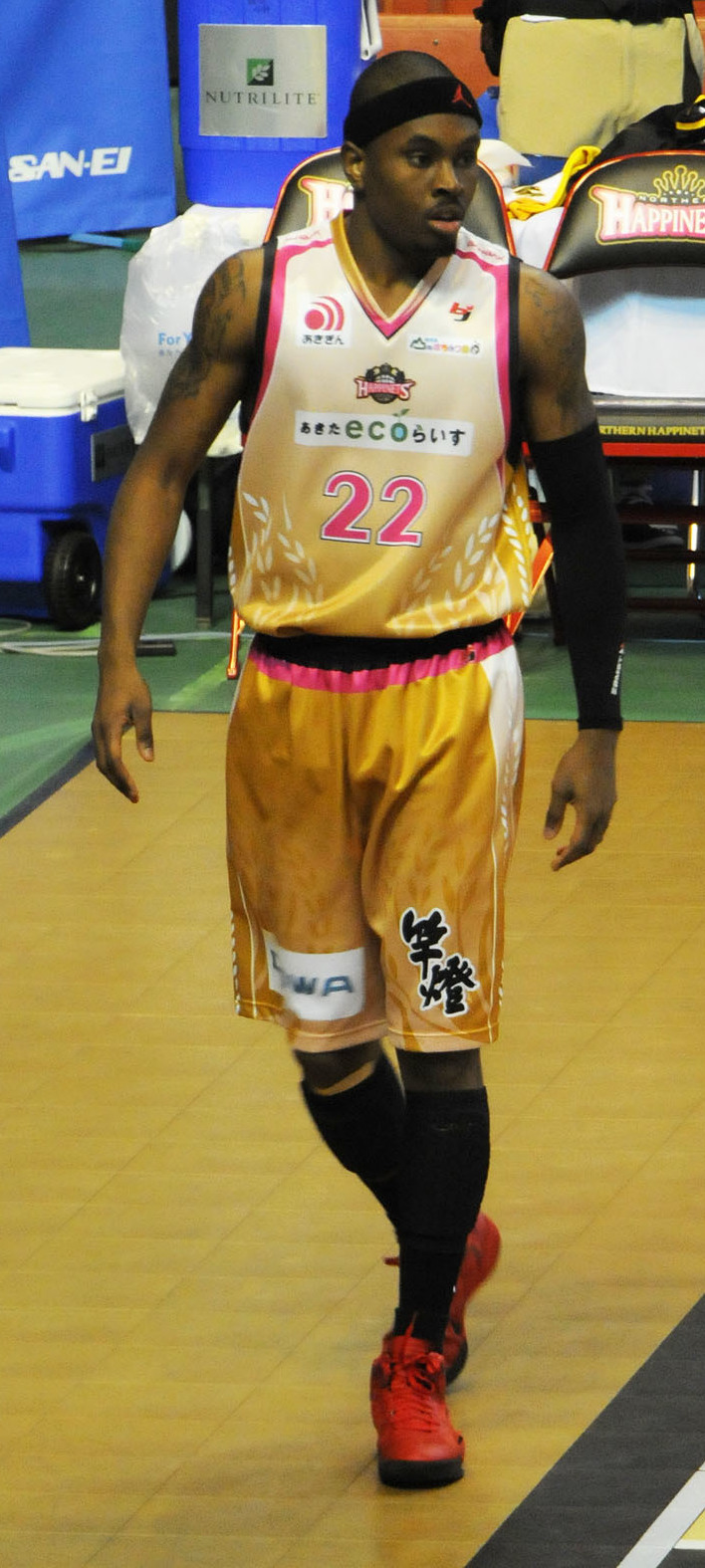
- Henry with Akita Northern Happinets in 2011

No. 5 – Leones de Quilpué
- Position: Shooting guard
- League: LNB Chile

Personal information
- Born: June 27, 1989 (age 37) Los Angeles, California, U.S.
- Listed height: 6 ft 4 in (1.93 m)
- Listed weight: 200 lb (91 kg)

Career information
- High school: Lynwood (Los Angeles, California)
- College: Nebraska (2006–2010)
- NBA draft: 2010: undrafted
- Playing career: 2010–present

Career history
- 2010–2011: Akita Northern Happinets
- 2012: Bucaneros de La Guaira
- 2012–2014: AZS Koszalin
- 2014: Brindisi
- 2014–2015: Orlandina
- 2015: Piratas de Quebradillas
- 2015–2016: Zaragoza
- 2016: Pau-Orthez
- 2016–2017: BCM Gravelines
- 2017–2018: Maccabi Ashdod
- 2018: Hunan Jinjian Rice Industry
- 2018–2019: Pınar Karşıyaka
- 2019–2020: New Zealand Breakers
- 2020: Hapoel Tel Aviv
- 2020–2021: Pınar Karşıyaka
- 2021–2022: JDA Dijon
- 2023–2024: Samsunspor
- 2024: Scafati
- 2024: Halcones de Xalapa
- 2025: Qadsia
- 2025–2026: Trepça
- 2026–present: Leones de Quilpué

Career highlights
- Kosovo Superleague champion (2026); Kosovo Cup winner (2026); Israeli League MVP (2018); All-Israeli League First Team (2018); Israeli League All-Star (2018)

Seketoure Michael "Sek" Henry (born June 27, 1989) is an American-Jamaican professional basketball player for the Leones de Quilpué of the LNB Chile. He played college basketball for University of Nebraska before playing professionally in Japan, Venezuela, Poland, Italy, Spain, France, Israel, Turkey and Australia. Playing for Maccabi Ashdod, he was named the 2018 Israeli Basketball Premier League MVP.

== Early life and college career ==
Henry attended Lynwood High School in Los Angeles, California. He played college basketball for University of Nebraska's Cornhuskers, where he averaged 7.5 points, 3.3 rebounds and 2.7 assists per game in his senior year.

== Professional career ==
=== Akita Northern Happinets (2010–2011) ===
In 2010, Henry started his professional career with the Japanese team Akita Northern Happinets of the bj league.

=== AZS Koszalin (2012–2014) ===
In 2012, Henry signed with the Polish team AZS Koszalin for the 2012–13 season. In his first season playing for Koszalin, he led the team to the 2013 Polish Cup Finals, where they fell short to Trefl Sopot.

On August 15, 2013, Henry signed a one-year contract extension with Koszalin. On February 15, 2014, Henry recorded a career-high 33 points, shooting 10-of-20 from the field, along with five rebounds and five assists in an 81–85 loss to Starogard Gdański. In 18 games played during the 2013–14 season, he averaged 15.7 points and 4.2 assists per game.

=== Brindisi / Orlandina (2014–2015) ===
On June 20, 2014, Henry signed with the Italian team Basket Brindisi for the 2014–15 season. However, on November 21, 2014, Henry parted ways with Brindisi to join Orlandina Basket for the rest of the season as a replacement for Jonny Flynn.

=== Zaragoza (2015–2016) ===
On August 4, 2015, Henry signed with the Spanish team Zaragoza for the 2015–16 season. During that season, Henry helped Zaragoza reach 2015–16 EuroCup Eighthfinals, where they eventually were eliminated by Trento.

=== Pau-Orthez / Gravelines (2016–2017) ===
On September 21, 2016, Henry signed a short-term contract with the French team Pau-Orthez as injury cover for Yannick Bokolo. In 7 games played for Pau-Orthez, he averaged 11.2 points and 2.8 assists per game. On November 3, 2016, Henry parted ways with Pau-Orthez to join BCM Gravelines for the rest of the season.

=== Maccabi Ashdod (2017–2018) ===
On July 16, 2017, Henry signed with the Israeli team Maccabi Ashdod for the 2017–18 season. On October 29, 2017, Henry recorded 26 points, shooting 7-for-8 from the field in an 86–74 win over Hapoel Jerusalem. Two days later, Henry was named co-Israeli League Round 4 MVP, alongside his teammate David Laury. On February 1, 2018, Henry was named Israeli League Player of the Month for games played in January.

Henry led Ashdod to the 2018 Israeli League Playoffs as the fourth seed, but they eventually were eliminated to Hapoel Tel Aviv in the Quarterfinals. Henry finished the season as the league fourth-leading scorer with 17.3 points per game and second in assists with 6.2 per game. Henry was named the Israeli League Regular Season MVP and earned a spot in the All-Israeli League First Team.

=== Pınar Karşıyaka (2018–19) ===
On July 28, 2018, Henry signed a one-year deal with the Turkish team Pınar Karşıyaka.

=== New Zealand Breakers (2019–2020) ===
On August 6, 2019, Henry signed with the New Zealand Breakers for the 2019–20 NBL season. He appeared in 25 games for the Breakers, averaging 13.4 points and 3.5 assists per game. He played alongside NBA player R. J. Hampton.

=== Hapoel Tel Aviv (2020) ===
On February 21, 2020, Henry returned to Israel for a second stint, signing with Hapoel Tel Aviv for the rest of the season.

=== Return to Pınar Karşıyaka (2020–2021) ===
On July 6, 2020, he has signed one year contract and return to Pınar Karşıyaka.

=== JDA Dijon (2021–2022) ===
On July 21, 2021, Henry signed with JDA Dijon Basket of the LNB Pro A and the Basketball Champions League.

=== Enemies (2022–2023) ===
On May 25, 2022, Henry was drafted by Enemies with the tenth overall pick of the 2022 BIG3 draft.

=== Samsunspor (2023–2024) ===
On September 24, 2023, he signed with Samsunspor of the Basketball Super League (BSL).

=== Scafati Basket (2024) ===
On March 7, 2024, he signed with Scafati Basket of the Lega Basket Serie A (LBA).

=== Trepça (2025–2026) ===
On November 11, 2025, Henry signed with Trepça of the Kosovo Basketball Superleague.

== Personal ==
His father, Ras Michael, is a Jamaican reggae singer. His girlfriend Amaka Kai'ro, is Nigerian afrobeat singer.

== Career statistics ==
Legend
| GP | Games played | MPG | Minutes per game | FG% | Field goal percentage |
| 3P% | 3-point field goal percentage | FT% | Free throw percentage | RPG | Rebounds per game |
| APG | Assists per game | SPG | Steals per game | BPG | Blocks per game |
| PPG | Points per game | **Bold** | Career high | | Led the league |

=== College ===
| Year | Team | GP | GS | MPG | FG% | 3P% | FT% | RPG | APG | SPG | BPG | PPG |
|---|---|---|---|---|---|---|---|---|---|---|---|---|
| 2006–07 | Nebraska | 31 | 18 | 21.3 | .400 | .254 | .600 | 1.97 | 1.68 | 0.74 | 0.16 | 5.81 |
| 2007–08 | Nebraska | 33 | 19 | 23.1 | .394 | .274 | .621 | 3.45 | 1.48 | 0.88 | 0.12 | 5.88 |
| 2008–09 | Nebraska | 31 | 29 | 25.5 | .440 | .338 | .688 | 3.39 | 2.06 | 0.94 | 0.26 | 8.03 |
| 2009–10 | Nebraska | 33 | 33 | 27.4 | .407 | .372 | .679 | 3.33 | 2.76 | 0.76 | 0.42 | 7.55 |
| Career | | 128 | 99 | 24.3 | .411 | .314 | .651 | 3.05 | 2.00 | 0.83 | 0.24 | 6.81 |

=== Professional ===
==== Regular season ====
| Year | Team | League | GP | MPG | FG% | 3P% | FT% | RPG | APG | SPG | BPG | PPG |
|---|---|---|---|---|---|---|---|---|---|---|---|---|
| 2010–11 | (Japan) Akita | bj league | **47** | 30.5 | .448 | .305 | .637 | **5.7** | 5.0 | **1.6** | **.3** | 18.7 |
| 2011–12 | (Venezuela) Bucaneros | LPB | 24 | 30.1 | **.514** | .376 | .670 | 3.2 | 1.9 | 1.5 | .2 | 14.7 |
| 2012–13 | (Poland) Koszalin | PLK | 38 | 27.5 | .439 | .292 | .616 | 3.3 | 2.6 | 1.4 | .2 | 10.8 |
| 2013–14 | (Poland) Koszalin | PLK | 18 | 33.3 | .500 | **.415** | .803 | 4.0 | 4.2 | 1.1 | **.3** | 15.6 |
| 2014–15 | (Italy) Brindisi | LBA | 6 | 20.3 | .471 | .333 | **1.000** | 2.6 | 2.0 | 1.3 | .1 | 6.1 |
| 2014–15 | (Italy) Orlandina | LBA | 24 | 33.3 | .455 | .388 | .676 | 4.4 | 3.4 | 1.2 | .2 | 13.3 |
| 2015–16 | (Spain) Zaragoza | ACB | 31 | 16.3 | .383 | .290 | .825 | 1.4 | 1.6 | .3 | .1 | 5.3 |
| 2016–17 | (France) Pau-Orthez | Pro A | 5 | 27.8 | .412 | .286 | .800 | 2.2 | 2.8 | .8 | .0 | 11.2 |
| 2016–17 | (France) Gravelines | Pro A | 27 | 30.3 | .434 | .358 | .768 | 3.0 | 2.4 | 1.4 | .2 | 12.5 |
| 2017–18 | (Israel) Ashdod | IPL | 37 | 34.2 | .461 | .396 | .744 | 3.4 | **5.9** | .9 | **.3** | 17.1 |
| 2018 | (China) Hunan Jinjian Rice Industry | NBL | 31 | **39.0** | .582 | .258 | .746 | 4.7 | 1.1 | 1.1 | .2 | **21.9** |
| 2018–19 | (Turkey) Karşıyaka | BSL | 26 | 31.3 | .462 | .396 | .690 | 2.8 | 4.4 | 1.0 | .2 | 13.8 |

Source: RealGM

==== Playoffs ====
| Year | Team | GP | GS | MPG | FG% | 3P% | FT% | RPG | APG | SPG | BPG | PPG |
|---|---|---|---|---|---|---|---|---|---|---|---|---|
| 2010–11 | Akita | 2 | | 29.0 | .514 | .375 | .667 | 2.0 | 4.0 | 0.5 | 0.5 | 24.0 |
| 2012–13 | Koszalin | 9 | | 32.2 | .443 | .348 | .765 | 3.0 | 4.2 | 1.8 | 0.4 | 13.9 |

Source: Pro Ballers

=== NBA preseason ===
| Year | Team | GP | GS | MPG | FG% | 3P% | FT% | RPG | APG | SPG | BPG | PPG |
|---|---|---|---|---|---|---|---|---|---|---|---|---|
| 2019 | NZ Breakers | 2 | 0 | 31.6 | .333 | .200 | .000 | 1.50 | 2.50 | 1.00 | 0.0 | 7.00 |
