= Urban Henry =

American gridiron football player (1935–1979)

No. 65, 67, 83, 74
- Position: Defensive tackle

Personal information
- Born: June 7, 1935; Berwick, Louisiana, U.S.
- Died: February 26, 1979 (aged 43); Franklin, Louisiana, U.S.
- Listed height: 6 ft 4 in (1.93 m)
- Listed weight: 265 lb (120 kg)

Career information
- High school: Morgan City (LA)
- College: Georgia Tech
- NFL draft: 1958: 4th round, 38th overall pick

Career history
- BC Lions (1958–1960); Los Angeles Rams (1961); Edmonton Eskimos (1962); Green Bay Packers (1963); Pittsburgh Steelers (1964)

Awards and highlights
- CFL West All-Star (1959)

Career NFL statistics
- Fumble recoveries: 1
- Sacks: 3.5
- Stats at Pro Football Reference

Career CFL statistics
- Games played: 47

Urban A. Henry (June 7, 1935 – February 26, 1979) was an American professional football defensive lineman who was an All-State football player at Morgan City High School in 1953 and played collegiately for Georgia Tech. He played professionally in the Canadian Football League (CFL) for the BC Lions and Edmonton Eskimos, and in the National Football League (NFL) for the Los Angeles Rams, Green Bay Packers, and Pittsburgh Steelers. He died of a heart attack at age 43.
