= 2019–20 Melbourne United season =

- Head coach: (Australia) Dean Vickerman
- Captain: (Australia) Chris Goulding
- Arena: Melbourne Arena

NBL results
- Record: 15–13 (53.6%)
- Ladder: 4th
- Finals finish: Semifinalist (lost to Kings 1–2)
- Stats at NBL.com.au

Player records
- Points: (United States) Trimble 19.4
- Rebounds: (United States) Long 9.4
- Assists: (United States) Trimble 4.5
- Efficiency: (United States) Stith 71%
- All statistics correct as of 21 April 2020.

The 2019–20 NBL season was the 37th season for Melbourne United in the NBL, and the 6th under the banner of Melbourne United.

== Roster ==
2019–20 Melbourne United roster
Players
Coaches

Pos.	No.	Nat.	Name	Ht.	Wt.
C	0	(South Sudan)	Lual-Acuil, Jo	2.13 m (7 ft 0 in)	102 kg (225 lb)
G	1	(United States)	Trimble, Melo (I)	1.91 m (6 ft 3 in)	88 kg (194 lb)
F	2	(United States)	Stith, Dillon (IN)	2.01 m (6 ft 7 in)	98 kg (216 lb)
G	5	(Australia)	Short, Sam (DP)	1.95 m (6 ft 5 in)	78 kg (172 lb)
G	10	(Australia)	McCarron, Mitch	1.89 m (6 ft 2 in)	97 kg (214 lb)
F	11	(United States)	Kidd, Stanton (I)	1.98 m (6 ft 6 in)	98 kg (216 lb)
F	12	(Australia)	Purchase, Jack (DP)	2.06 m (6 ft 9 in)	95 kg (209 lb)
F	14	(New Zealand)	Smith-Milner, Tohi	2.05 m (6 ft 9 in)	112 kg (247 lb)
F	20	(Australia)	Barlow, David	2.05 m (6 ft 9 in)	97 kg (214 lb)
C	21	(United States)	Long, Shawn (I)	2.06 m (6 ft 9 in)	112 kg (247 lb)
F	23	(United States)	Prather, Casey (injured) (I)	1.98 m (6 ft 6 in)	96 kg (212 lb)
G/F	30	(Australia)	McDaniel, Sam	1.95 m (6 ft 5 in)	100 kg (220 lb)
C	35	(New Zealand)	Pledger, Alex	2.15 m (7 ft 1 in)	113 kg (249 lb)
G	43	(Australia)	Goulding, Chris (C)	1.92 m (6 ft 4 in)	92 kg (203 lb)
G	55	(New Zealand)	Ili, Shea	1.83 m (6 ft 0 in)	85 kg (187 lb)

Head coach

- (Australia) Dean Vickerman

Assistant coach(es)

- (Australia) Justin Schueller
- (New Zealand) Ross McMains

Strength & conditioning coach(es)

- (Australia) Nik Popovic

Legend

- (C) Team captain
- (DP) Development player
- (IN) Inactive
- (I) Import player
- (TP) Training player
- (NS) Next Star player
- Injured

- Roster
Updated: 20 December 2019

=== Depth chart ===
Pos.	Starting 5	Bench 1	Bench 2	Development
C	Shawn Long	Jo Lual-Acuil	Alex Pledger
PF	David Barlow	Tohi Smith-Milner		Jack Purchase
SF	Mitch McCarron	Dillon Stith	Casey Prather
SG	Chris Goulding	Sam McDaniel
PG	Melo Trimble	Shea Ili		Sam Short

== Game log ==
=== Preseason ===
2019–20 pre-season game log
Pre-Season: 4–2 (Home: 4–2; Road: 0–0)

Game	Date	Team	Score	High points	High rebounds	High assists	Location Attendance	Record
1	6 August	California Baptist Lancers	L 78-79	David Barlow (30)	Short, Lual-Acuil & Diing (6)	Sam Short (5)	Melbourne Sports and Aquatic Centre	0-1
2	18 August	Zhejiang Lions	W 97-77	Jo Lual-Acuil (20)	Jack Purchase (11)	Mitch McCarron (6)	Melbourne Sports and Aquatic Centre	1-1
3	3 September	Shanxi Loongs	W 111-66	Shawn Long (22)	Mitch McCarron (10)	Casey Prather (6)	State Basketball Centre	2-1
4	6 September	Cairns Taipans	W 104-88	Jo Lual-Acuil (25)	Jo Lual-Acuil (9)	Mitch McCarron (6)	Casey Stadium	3-1
5	8 September	Brisbane Bullets	L 80-102	Shawn Long (22)	Shawn Long, Jo Lual-Acuil (10)	Melo Trimble (4)	Melbourne Sports and Aquatic Centre	3-2
6	13 September	Illawarra Hawks	W 111-70	Casey Prather (31)	Shawn Long (11)	Mitch McCarron (6)	Ballarat Sports Events Centre	4-2

NBL Blitz: 1–1 (Home: 0–0; Road: 1–1)

Game	Date	Team	Score	High points	High rebounds	High assists	Location Attendance	Record
1	20 September	New Zealand Breakers	L 76-97	Shawn Long (24)	Shawn Long (8)	Melo Trimble (3)	Kingborough Sports Centre	0-1
2	22 September	Illawarra Hawks	W 110-91	Casey Prather (23)	Shawn Long (11)	Shea Ili (5)	Derwent Entertainment Centre	1-1

Pre-Season: 1–1 (Home: 0–1; Road: 1–0)

Game	Date	Team	Score	High points	High rebounds	High assists	Location Attendance	Record
7	25 September	Perth Wildcats	L 90-92	Melo Trimble (17)	Long, Pledger, Trimble (5)	Melo Trimble (7)	Geelong Arena	4-3
8	27 September	@ Adelaide 36ers	W 91-100	Melo Trimble (19)	Jo Lual-Acuil, Mitch McCarron (8)	Mitch McCarron (8)	Adelaide Entertainment Centre	5-3

NBLxNBA: 0–2 (Home: 0–0; Road: 0–2)

Game	Date	Team	Score	High points	High rebounds	High assists	Location Attendance	Record
1	13 October	@ Los Angeles Clippers	L 110-118	Melo Trimble (22)	Shawn Long (9)	Melo Trimble (6)	STAPLES Center	5-4
2	16 October	@ Sacramento Kings	L 110-124	Chris Goulding (25)	Shawn Long (15)	Melo Trimble (6)	Golden 1 Center	5-5

=== Ladder ===
Pos	2019–20 NBL season											
Pos	Team	Pld	W	L	PCT	Last 5	Streak	Home	Away	PF	PA	PP
1	Sydney Kings	28	20	8	71.43%	4–1	W2	12–2	8–6	2642	2472	106.88%
2	Perth Wildcats	28	19	9	67.86%	4–1	W3	11–3	8–6	2529	2409	104.98%
3	Cairns Taipans	28	16	12	57.14%	3–2	L2	11–3	5–9	2587	2547	101.57%
4	Melbourne United	28	15	13	53.57%	4–1	W3	9–5	6–8	2638	2560	103.05%
5	Brisbane Bullets	28	15	13	53.57%	3–2	W1	10–4	5–9	2607	2557	101.96%
6	New Zealand Breakers	28	15	13	53.57%	4–1	W4	9–5	6–8	2514	2468	101.86%
7	Adelaide 36ers	28	12	16	42.86%	1–4	L2	8–6	4–10	2654	2768	95.88%
8	S.E. Melbourne Phoenix	28	9	19	32.14%	0–5	L8	6–8	3–11	2671	2761	96.74%
9	Illawarra Hawks	28	5	23	17.86%	0–5	L10	3–11	2–12	2354	2654	88.70%

Updated to match(es) played on 16 February 2020. Source: NBL.com.au

=== Ladder progression ===
- Numbers highlighted in green indicate that the team finished the round inside the top four.
- Numbers highlighted in blue indicates the team finished first on the ladder in that round.
- Numbers highlighted in red indicates the team finished last place on the ladder in that round.

2019–20 NBL season
Team	1	2	3	4	5	6	7	8	9	10	11	12	13	14	15	16	17	18	19	20
Adelaide 36ers	–	8	4	4	5	6	6	5	5	6	4	5	5	5	5	7	7	7	7	7
Brisbane Bullets	2	4	5	5	4	5	5	6	7	7	7	7	8	7	6	5	4	4	5	5
Cairns Taipans	7	7	6	6	8	8	7	7	6	4	6	4	4	4	3	3	3	3	3	3
Illawarra Hawks	6	5	7	9	9	9	9	8	9	9	9	9	9	9	9	9	9	9	9	9
Melbourne United	5	6	8	8	6	4	3	3	4	3	3	3	3	3	4	4	5	6	6	4
New Zealand Breakers	–	–	9	7	7	7	8	9	8	8	8	8	7	6	8	6	6	5	4	6
Perth Wildcats	4	2	3	2	2	3	2	2	2	2	2	2	2	2	2	2	2	2	2	2
S.E. Melbourne Phoenix	3	3	2	3	3	2	4	4	3	5	5	6	6	8	7	8	8	8	8	8
Sydney Kings	1	1	1	1	1	1	1	1	1	1	1	1	1	1	1	1	1	1	1	1

=== Regular season ===
2019–20 game log
October: 1–4 (Home: 1–2; Road: 0–2)

Game	Date	Team	Score	High points	High rebounds	High assists	Location Attendance	Record
1	3 October	S.E. Melbourne	L 88–91	Chris Goulding (27)	Shawn Long (13)	Melo Trimble (6)	Melbourne Arena	0–1
2	5 October	@ Perth	L 94–93	Melo Trimble (25)	Melo Trimble (8)	Melo Trimble (5)	RAC Arena	0–2
3	20 October	Perth	L 93–95	Melo Trimble (21)	Shawn Long 12	Melo Trimble 5	Melbourne Arena	0–3
4	26 October	New Zealand	W 104–98	Shawn Long (27)	Shawn Long (11)	Mitch McCarron (7)	Melbourne Arena	1–3
5	28 October	@ Cairns	L 90–85	Shawn Long, Melo Trimble (21)	Shawn Long (17)	Chris Goulding (5)	Cairns Convention Centre	1–4

November: 6–1 (Home: 4–0; Road: 2–1)

Game	Date	Team	Score	High points	High rebounds	High assists	Location Attendance	Record
6	2 November	@ S.E. Melbourne	W 98–110	Shawn Long (31)	Shawn Long (11)	Mitch McCarron (4)	Melbourne Arena	2–4
7	4 November	Sydney	W 107–104	Melo Trimble (27)	Shawn Long (14)	Melo Trimble (5)	Melbourne Arena	3–4
8	7 November	@ New Zealand	W 101–104	Chris Goulding (24)	Shawn Long (8)	Melo Trimble (5)	Spark Arena	4–4
9	10 November	Adelaide	W 109–90	Melo Trimble (32)	David Barlow (7)	Mitch McCarron (5)	Melbourne Arena	5–4
10	16 November	S.E. Melbourne	W 96–95	Melo Trimble (22)	Shawn Long, Mitch McCarron (8)	Shea Ili (4)	Melbourne Arena	6–4
11	24 November	Brisbane	W 108–94	Melo Trimble (25)	Jo Lual-Acuil (13)	Mitch McCarron (7)	Melbourne Arena	7–4
12	29 November	@ Cairns	L 93–86	Chris Goulding (19)	Shawn Long (14)	Chris Goulding, Melo Trimble (4)	Cairns Convention Centre	7–5

December: 3–4 (Home: 1–3; Road: 2–1)

Game	Date	Team	Score	High points	High rebounds	High assists	Location Attendance	Record
13	1 December	@ Sydney	L 111–101	Melo Trimble (32)	Mitch McCarron (6)	Melo Trimble (4)	Qudos Bank Arena	7–6
14	7 December	Adelaide	W 112–90	Shawn Long (34)	Shawn Long (15)	Chris Goulding, Mitch McCarron (4)	Melbourne Arena	8–6
15	14 December	Sydney	L 81–104	Melo Trimble (19)	Jo Lual-Acuil (6)	Melo Trimble (5)	Melbourne Arena	8–7
16	16 December	@ Illawarra	W 73–94	Melo Trimble (22)	Shawn Long (14)	Melo Trimble (6)	WIN Entertainment Centre	9–7
17	21 December	@ Perth	W 74–87	Shawn Long, Melo Trimble (23)	Shawn Long (13)	Melo Trimble (6)	RAC Arena	10–7
18	26 December	Cairns	L 75–77	Melo Trimble (16)	Shawn Long (12)	Goulding, Ili, McCarron (2)	Melbourne Arena	10–8
19	29 December	Brisbane	L 96–102	Shawn Long (25)	Stanton Kidd, Shawn Long (8)	Melo Trimble (7)	Melbourne Arena	10–9

January: 2–3 (Home: 1–0; Road: 1–3)

Game	Date	Team	Score	High points	High rebounds	High assists	Location Attendance	Record
20	4 January	@ Illawarra	W 91–104	Chris Goulding, Stanton Kidd (21)	Shawn Long (7)	Melo Trimble (5)	WIN Entertainment Centre	11–9
21	11 January	@ Adelaide	L 100–86	Chris Goulding (26)	Shawn Long (15)	Mitch McCarron, Melo Trimble (5)	Adelaide Entertainment Centre	11–10
22	19 January	@ New Zealand	L 90–68	Shawn Long (18)	Kidd, Long, Lual-Acuil, Trimble (4)	Melo Trimble 5	Spark Arena	11–11
23	26 January	@ Sydney	L 106–88	Melo Trimble (26)	Stanton Kidd (7)	Melo Trimble (2)	Qudos Bank Arena	11–12
24	29 January	Perth	W 77–67	Chris Goulding (17)	Jo Lual-Acuil (10)	Ili, McCarron, Trimble (3)	Melbourne Arena	12–12

February: 3–1 (Home: 2–0; Road: 1–1)

Game	Date	Team	Score	High points	High rebounds	High assists	Location Attendance	Record
25	1 February	@ Brisbane	L 87–83	Melo Trimble (36)	Shawn Long (9)	Melo Trimble (6)	Nissan Arena	12–13
26	8 February	Illawarra	W 95–72	Chris Goulding (20)	Stanton Kidd (10)	Melo Trimble (9)	Melbourne Arena	13–13
27	13 February	Cairns	W 99–83	Chris Goulding (23)	Shawn Long (10)	Mitch McCarron (8)	Melbourne Arena	14–13
28	16 February	@ S.E. Melbourne	W 90–109	Chris Goulding (28)	Shawn Long (11)	Mitch McCarron (7)	Melbourne Arena	15–13

=== Postseason ===
2020 finals game log
Semifinals: 1–2 (Home: 1–0; Road: 0–2)

Game	Date	Team	Score	High points	High rebounds	High assists	Location Attendance	Record
1	29 February	@ Sydney	L 86–80	Melo Trimble (34)	Shawn Long (11)	Melo Trimble (5)	Qudos Bank Arena	0–1
2	2 March	Sydney	W 125–80	Shawn Long (26)	Shawn Long (11)	Mitch McCarron (5)	Melbourne Arena	1–1
3	5 March	@ Sydney	L 89–87	Chris Goulding (11)	Shawn Long (9)	Shea Ili (5)	Qudos Bank Arena	1–2

== Transactions ==
=== Re-signed ===
Player	Signed
David Barlow	29 April
Alex Pledger	30 April
Tohi Smith-Milner	7 May

=== Additions ===
Player	Signed	Former team
Melo Trimble	26 April	Cairns Taipans
Shawn Long	30 May	New Zealand Breakers
Shea Ili	20 June	New Zealand Breakers
Casey Prather	17 July	Promitheas Patras
Jack Purchase	9 August	Melbourne Tigers (NBL1)
Jo Lual-Acuil	20 August	Hapoel Galil Elyon
Dillon Stith	15 December	Belfast Star
Stanton Kidd	20 December	Utah Jazz

=== Subtractions ===
Player	Reason left	New team
Dan Trist	Released	South East Melbourne Phoenix
Casper Ware	Free agent	Sydney Kings
Craig Moller	Free agent	Sydney Kings
Josh Boone	Free agent	Illawarra Hawks
Casey Prather	Released	Hapoel Eilat

== Awards ==
=== Player of the Week ===
- Round 4, Shawn Long
- Round 20, Chris Goulding

=== Melbourne United Awards ===
- Most Valuable Player: Shawn Long
- Best Defensive Player: Shea Ili
- Coaches Award: Shea Ili & Mitch McCarron

== See also ==
- 2019–20 NBL season
- Melbourne United
