= 2019–20 New Zealand Breakers season =

- Head coach: (Israel) Dan Shamir
- Captain: (New Zealand) Thomas Abercrombie
- Arena: Spark Arena

NBL results
- Record: 15–13 (53.6%)
- Ladder: 6th
- Finals finish: Did not qualify
- Stats at NBL.com.au

Player records
- Points: (New Zealand) Webster 19.6
- Rebounds: (United States) Ashley 6.5
- Assists: (United States) Hopson 4.7

Uniforms
Home	Away
- All statistics correct as of 21 April 2020.

The 2019–20 NBL season was the 17th season for the New Zealand Breakers in the NBL.

== Season summary ==
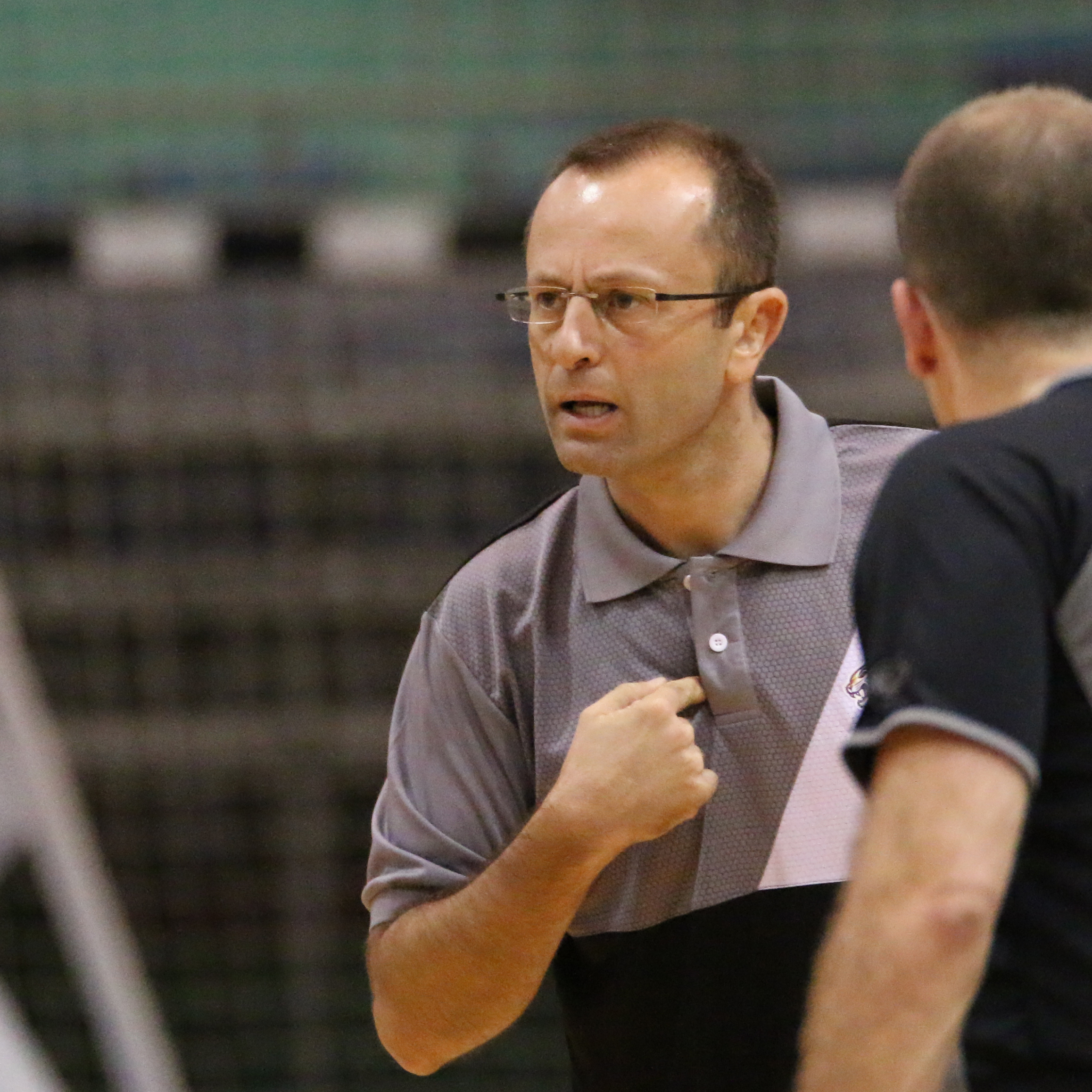
Dan Shamir

For the 2019–20 season, the Breakers acquired the services of internationally respected Israeli coach Dan Shamir, replacing Kevin Braswell. He bought with him nearly two decades of extensive experience coaching in Europe and Israel, the highlight being part of two Euroleague championship wins with Israel's Maccabi Tel Aviv.

Shamir recruited seven new players, including US teen sensation R. J. Hampton as part of the NBL Next Stars program. The Breakers and SKY Sport agreed to a multi-year naming rights sponsorship through to 2023, along with broadcast rights for the next four years, including free to air viewing of 14 games on Prime in New Zealand. The club also announced it would take four games around New Zealand, one each to New Plymouth and Invercargill, plus two in Christchurch after a near 15-year hiatus. The Breakers began their 2019–20 campaign with a pre-season trip to the United States with games against NBA teams the Memphis Grizzlies and Oklahoma City Thunder, losing both by double digits.

Turmoil engulfed the early stages of the season, with their on-court woes of a 2–7 start coinciding with off-court woes. An injury to import Scotty Hopson led to the controversial signing of troubled American journeyman Glen Rice Jr., who less than two weeks after arriving in Auckland was arrested after a scuffle in a bar and subsequently suspended indefinitely by the club. Additionally, Breakers owner Matt Walsh was fined $5000 and given a two-game ban for getting into a heated argument with the NBL commissioner after a game, and forward Tom Vodanovich was met by police following a flight from Perth to Auckland in November after taking a sleeping pill in conjunction with alcohol that led to misbehaviour on the flight. The multitude of incidents led to the questioning of the club's culture, with the new ownership seemingly moving away from the family values installed under previous owners Paul and Liz Blackwell. Despite the controversy surrounding the club, the Breakers were playing to record home crowds and the 24 October encounter against the Illawarra Hawks—which saw Hampton matched-up with LaMelo Ball—was the most-watched game in NBL history with nearly two million views globally on Facebook. There were an estimated five million views on highlights from the game shared on social media platforms including Twitter, Instagram and YouTube.

A loss against the Adelaide 36ers on 24 November saw them drop to 2–8 — their worst start to a campaign since their debut in 2003–04 when they also lost eight of their first 10 games. Additionally, the team lost Corey Webster to an ankle injury. Rice was reinstated to the roster for round 10 following an investigation by Basketball Australia, but following his return match against the Taipans, he was arrested again for breaching bail conditions and was subsequently sacked by the Breakers. His release coincided with the return of Hopson from injury. After dropping to a 4–10 record, Webster left for China. A remarkable turn around occurred from round 13 onwards with the Breakers reaching 8–10 by the end of December following a four-game winning streak, and then winning 11 of their last 14 games to finish the season 15–13, only missing the playoffs on points differential. The late-season push saw the Breakers being dubbed "the team no one wants to play in the playoffs".

== Roster ==
2019–20 New Zealand Breakers roster
Players
Coaches

Pos.	No.	Nat.	Name	Ht.	Wt.
G	0	(China)	Li, Terry (DP)	1.98 m (6 ft 6 in)
G/F	1	(United States)	Hopson, Scotty (I)	2.01 m (6 ft 7 in)	104 kg (229 lb)
F	3	(New Zealand)	Delany, Finn	1.98 m (6 ft 6 in)	102 kg (225 lb)
G/F	10	(New Zealand)	Abercrombie, Thomas (C)	1.98 m (6 ft 6 in)	90 kg (198 lb)
F	13	(New Zealand)	Vodanovich, Tom	2.01 m (6 ft 7 in)	100 kg (220 lb)
G	14	(United States)	Hampton, R. J. (injured) (IN, NS)	1.93 m (6 ft 4 in)	82 kg (181 lb)
F/C	15	(New Zealand)	Loe, Robert	2.11 m (6 ft 11 in)	111 kg (245 lb)
F	20	(New Zealand)	Ngatai, Jordan	1.95 m (6 ft 5 in)	98 kg (216 lb)
F	21	(United States)	Ashley, Brandon (I)	2.06 m (6 ft 9 in)	104 kg (229 lb)
G	22	(United States)	Henry, Sek (I)	1.93 m (6 ft 4 in)	90 kg (198 lb)
G/F	25	(New Zealand)	Rusbatch, Ethan	1.96 m (6 ft 5 in)	97 kg (214 lb)
C	33	(Lebanon)	Majok, Ater (injured)	2.08 m (6 ft 10 in)	106 kg (234 lb)
G/F	45	(South Sudan)	Deng, Deng	2.03 m (6 ft 8 in)	93 kg (205 lb)
G	97	(Australia)	Weeks, Jarrad	1.85 m (6 ft 1 in)	80 kg (176 lb)

Head coach

- (Israel) Dan Shamir

Assistant coach(es)

- (New Zealand) Zico Coronel
- (Israel) Mody Maor

Legend

- (C) Team captain
- (DP) Development player
- (IN) Inactive
- (I) Import player
- (NS) Next Star player
- Injured

- Roster
Updated: 18 December 2019

=== Depth chart ===
Pos.	Starting 5	Bench 1	Bench 2	Development
C	Ater Majok	Robert Loe
PF	Brandon Ashley	Finn Delany	Tom Vodanovich
SF	Scotty Hopson	Thomas Abercrombie	Jordan Ngatai
SG	Sek Henry	Ethan Rusbatch
PG	R. J. Hampton	Jarrad Weeks		Terry Li

== Pre-season ==
The Breakers pre-season games included one regular pre-season game against the Adelaide 36ers, two games in the NBL Blitz and another two games in the NBLxNBA series, and only played a total of five games.

=== Game log ===
2019–20 game log
NBL Blitz: 1–1 (Home: 0–0; Road: 1–1)

Game	Date	Team	Score	High points	High rebounds	High assists	Location Attendance	Record
1	20 September	Melbourne United	W 76-97	Corey Webster (24)	Robert Loe (7)	Corey Webster (5)	Kingborough Sports Centre	1-0
2	22 September	South East Melbourne Phoenix	L 102-95	R. J. Hampton (20)	R. J. Hampton, Chris Obekpa (5)	Scotty Hopson (4)	Derwent Entertainment Centre	1-1

Pre-season: 0–2 (Home: 0–0; Road: 0–2)

Game	Date	Team	Score	High points	High rebounds	High assists	Location Attendance	Record
1	24 September	@ Adelaide 36ers	L 93-67	R. J. Hampton (19)	Rob Loe (9)	R. J. Hampton (3)	Titanium Security Arena	0-1
2	26 September	@ Sydney Kings	L 81-64	R. J. Hampton (18)	Ethan Rusbatch (11)	R. J. Hampton (7)	Sydney Uni Sports & Aquatic Centre	0-2

NBLxNBA: 0–2 (Home: 0–0; Road: 0–2)

Game	Date	Team	Score	High points	High rebounds	High assists	Location Attendance	Record
1	8 October	@ Memphis Grizzlies	L 108-94	Corey Webster (19)	Scotty Hopson (8)	Corey Webster (8)	FedExForum	0-3
2	10 October	@ Oklahoma City Thunder	L 84-110	Rob Loe (19)	Scotty Hopson, Ater Majok (6)	R. J. Hampton, Sek Henry (5)	Chesapeake Energy Arena	0-4

== Regular season ==
The regular season of the NBL consisted of 28 games, with 10 of the Breakers' 14 home games held at Spark Arena, two held at Horncastle Arena, one at TSB Stadium and one at iLT Stadium Southland.

=== Standings ===
Pos	2019–20 NBL season											
Pos	Team	Pld	W	L	PCT	Last 5	Streak	Home	Away	PF	PA	PP
1	Sydney Kings	28	20	8	71.43%	4–1	W2	12–2	8–6	2642	2472	106.88%
2	Perth Wildcats	28	19	9	67.86%	4–1	W3	11–3	8–6	2529	2409	104.98%
3	Cairns Taipans	28	16	12	57.14%	3–2	L2	11–3	5–9	2587	2547	101.57%
4	Melbourne United	28	15	13	53.57%	4–1	W3	9–5	6–8	2638	2560	103.05%
5	Brisbane Bullets	28	15	13	53.57%	3–2	W1	10–4	5–9	2607	2557	101.96%
6	New Zealand Breakers	28	15	13	53.57%	4–1	W4	9–5	6–8	2514	2468	101.86%
7	Adelaide 36ers	28	12	16	42.86%	1–4	L2	8–6	4–10	2654	2768	95.88%
8	S.E. Melbourne Phoenix	28	9	19	32.14%	0–5	L8	6–8	3–11	2671	2761	96.74%
9	Illawarra Hawks	28	5	23	17.86%	0–5	L10	3–11	2–12	2354	2654	88.70%

Updated to match(es) played on 16 February 2020. Source: NBL.com.au

=== Ladder progression ===
- Numbers highlighted in green indicate that the team finished the round inside the top four.
- Numbers highlighted in blue indicates the team finished first on the ladder in that round.
- Numbers highlighted in red indicates the team finished last place on the ladder in that round.

2019–20 NBL season
Team	1	2	3	4	5	6	7	8	9	10	11	12	13	14	15	16	17	18	19	20
Adelaide 36ers	–	8	4	4	5	6	6	5	5	6	4	5	5	5	5	7	7	7	7	7
Brisbane Bullets	2	4	5	5	4	5	5	6	7	7	7	7	8	7	6	5	4	4	5	5
Cairns Taipans	7	7	6	6	8	8	7	7	6	4	6	4	4	4	3	3	3	3	3	3
Illawarra Hawks	6	5	7	9	9	9	9	8	9	9	9	9	9	9	9	9	9	9	9	9
Melbourne United	5	6	8	8	6	4	3	3	4	3	3	3	3	3	4	4	5	6	6	4
New Zealand Breakers	–	–	9	7	7	7	8	9	8	8	8	8	7	6	8	6	6	5	4	6
Perth Wildcats	4	2	3	2	2	3	2	2	2	2	2	2	2	2	2	2	2	2	2	2
S.E. Melbourne Phoenix	3	3	2	3	3	2	4	4	3	5	5	6	6	8	7	8	8	8	8	8
Sydney Kings	1	1	1	1	1	1	1	1	1	1	1	1	1	1	1	1	1	1	1	1

=== Game log ===
2019–20 game log
October: 2–3 (Home: 2–1; Road: 0–2)

Game	Date	Team	Score	High points	High rebounds	High assists	Location Attendance	Record
1	18 October	@ Sydney Kings	L 96-91	Scotty Hopson (27)	Thomas Abercrombie (11)	Scotty Hopson, Corey Webster (3)	Qudos Bank Arena	0-1
2	20 October	Sydney Kings	L 66-76	Corey Webster (14)	Brandon Ashley, Robert Loe (8)	Scotty Hopson (4)	Spark Arena	0-2
3	24 October	Illawarra Hawks	W 103-72	Sek Henry (21)	Scotty Hopson (9)	Corey Webster (6)	Spark Arena	1-2
4	26 October	@ Melbourne United	L 104-98	Brandon Ashley (24)	Thomas Abercrombie (8)	Corey Webster 6	Melbourne Arena	1-3
5	31 October	Cairns Taipans	W 93-85	Corey Webster (23)	Brandon Ashley (11)	Corey Webster (8)	Spark Arena	2-3

November: 1–5 (Home: 1–2; Road: 0–3)

Game	Date	Team	Score	High points	High rebounds	High assists	Location Attendance	Record
6	3 November	Perth Wildcats	L 79-84	Brandon Ashley, Corey Webster (21)	R. J. Hampton (7)	Corey Webster (6)	iLT Stadium Southland	2-4
7	7 November	Melbourne United	L 101-104	Glen Rice Jr. (26)	Brandon Ashley, Corey Webster (8)	Corey Webster (4)	Spark Arena	2-5
8	9 November	@ South East Melbourne Phoenix	L 103-78	Corey Webster (22)	Brandon Ashley (12)	Sek Henry (8)	Melbourne Arena	2-6
9	17 November	@ Perth Wildcats	L 88-77	Corey Webster (23)	Brandon Ashley, Corey Webster (7)	R. J. Hampton (5)	RAC Arena	2-7
10	24 November	@ Adelaide 36ers	L 117-100	Sek Henry (18)	Brandon Ashley (8)	R. J. Hampton (6)	Adelaide Entertainment Centre	2-8
11	30 November	Illawarra Hawks	W 91-79	Sek Henry (25)	Brandon Ashley (14)	Sek Henry (3)	Spark Arena	3-8

December: 5–2 (Home: 2–1; Road: 3–1)

Game	Date	Team	Score	High points	High rebounds	High assists	Location Attendance	Record
12	6 December	@ Cairns Taipans	L 108-90	Glen Rice Jr. (30)	Glen Rice Jr. (12)	Glen Rice Jr. (8)	Cairns Convention Centre	3-9
13	9 December	Brisbane Bullets	W 96-85	Corey Webster (23)	Finn Delany (8)	Finn Delany, Corey Webster (3)	Spark Arena	4-9
14	15 December	Adelaide 36ers	L 96-99	Thomas Abercrombie (22)	Thomas Abercrombie (9)	Scotty Hopson (6)	Spark Arena	4-10
15	20 December	South East Melbourne Phoenix	W 90-84	Scotty Hopson (24)	Scotty Hopson (9)	Sek Henry (4)	Horncastle Arena	5-10
16	22 December	@ Illawarra Hawks	W 89-91	Scotty Hopson (19)	Scotty Hopson (7)	Sek Henry (6)	WIN Entertainment Centre	6-10
17	27 December	@ Brisbane Bullets	W 96-99	Scotty Hopson (27)	Brandon Ashley, Finn Delany (7)	Sek Henry, Scotty Hopson (4)	Nissan Arena	7-10
18	29 December	@ Adelaide 36ers	W 87-96	Scotty Hopson (31)	Brandon Ashley (9)	Sek Henry (8)	Adelaide Entertainment Centre	8-10

January: 4–3 (Home: 3–1; Road: 1–2)

Game	Date	Team	Score	High points	High rebounds	High assists	Location Attendance	Record
19	5 January	@ South East Melbourne Phoenix	W 92-97	Thomas Abercrombie (24)	Robert Loe (7)	Scotty Hopson (6)	State Basketball Centre	9-10
20	9 January	@ Cairns Taipans	L 85-79	Robert Loe (24)	Abercrombie, Loe, Hopson (7)	Hopson (8)	Cairns Convention Centre	9-11
21	12 January	Brisbane Bullets	L 85-95	Thomas Abercrombie, Sek Henry (17)	Finn Delany (6)	Scotty Hopson (6)	Spark Arena	9-12
22	17 January	Sydney Kings	W 86-81	Scotty Hopson (30)	Finn Delany (13)	Scotty Hopson (5)	TSB Stadium	10-12
23	19 January	Melbourne United	W 90-68	Scotty Hopson (22)	Finn Delany (10)	Thomas Abercrombie (5)	Spark Arena	11-12
24	25 January	@ Perth Wildcats	L 90-89	Brandon Ashley (21)	Brandon Ashley (11)	Scotty Hopson, Jarrad Weeks (5)	RAC Arena	11-13
25	31 January	Adelaide 36ers	W 113-89	Thomas Abercrombie (31)	Finn Delany (10)	Sek Henry (8)	Spark Arena	12-13

February: 3–0 (Home: 1–0; Road: 2–0)

Game	Date	Team	Score	High points	High rebounds	High assists	Location Attendance	Record
26	2 February	@ Illawarra Hawks	W 56-65	Sek Henry (17)	Finn Delany (6)	Scotty Hopson (9)	WIN Entertainment Centre	13-13
27	7 February	@ Brisbane Bullets	W 87-91	Scotty Hopson (31)	Finn Delany (12)	Sek Henry (5)	Nissan Arena	14-13
28	14 February	South East Melbourne Phoenix	W 92-83	Scotty Hopson (23)	Abercrombie, Ashley, Loe, Hopson (5)	Scotty Hopson (10)	Spark Arena	15-13

== Awards ==
=== Player of the Week ===
Round 12, Scotty Hopson

Round 16, Scotty Hopson

== See also ==
- 2019–20 NBL season
- New Zealand Breakers
