= Majok Majok =

South Sudanese-Australian basketball player (born 1992)

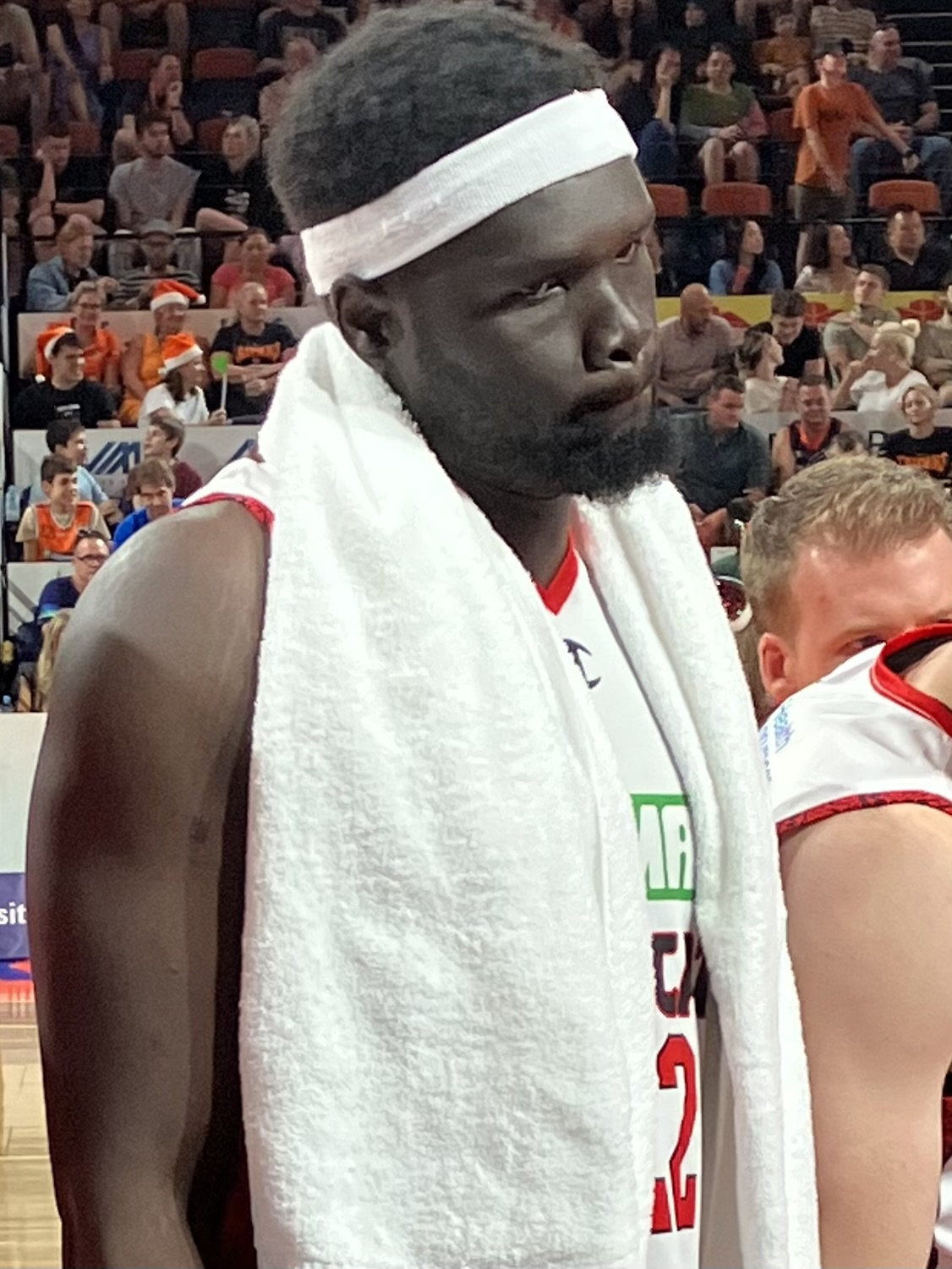
- Majok with the Perth Wildcats in 2022

Albury Wodonga Bandits
- Position: Center / power forward
- League: NBL1 East

Personal information
- Born: 10 December 1992 (age 33) Rumbek, South Sudan
- Listed height: 210 cm (6 ft 11 in)
- Listed weight: 112 kg (247 lb)

Career information
- High school: Kingsway Christian College (Perth, Western Australia); Northfield Mount Hermon (Northfield, Massachusetts)
- College: Midland College (2010–2012); Ball State (2012–2014)
- NBA draft: 2014: undrafted
- Playing career: 2007–present

Career history
- 2007: East Perth Eagles
- 2008: Kalamunda Eastern Suns
- 2014–2015: Helios Suns
- 2015–2018: Melbourne United
- 2018: Wellington Saints
- 2018–2019: New Zealand Breakers
- 2019: Frankston Blues
- 2019–2023: Perth Wildcats
- 2022: Warwick Senators
- 2023: North Gold Coast Seahawks
- 2024–2025: Ballarat Miners
- 2024–2025: South East Melbourne Phoenix
- 2026–present: Albury Wodonga Bandits

Career highlights
- 3× NBL champion (2018, 2020, 2024); NBL Cup winner (2021); 2× Third-team All-MAC (2013, 2014)

Majok Maker Majok (born 10 December 1992) is a South Sudanese-Australian professional basketball player for the Albury Wodonga Bandits of the NBL1 East. He played college basketball for the Ball State Cardinals for two years, leading the Mid-American Conference (MAC) in rebounding and earning third-team all-conference honors in both seasons. He debuted in the National Basketball League (NBL) in 2015. He is a three-time NBL champion, winning in 2018 with Melbourne United and 2020 with the Perth Wildcats, and being part of the Tasmania JackJumpers' extended squad when they won the championship in 2024.

== Early life and career ==
Majok was born in Rumbek, South Sudan, and moved to Australia when he was eight. His family settled in Perth. He initially played soccer before developing a liking for basketball in high school at Kingsway Christian College. In 2007 and 2008, he played in the State Basketball League (SBL) for the East Perth Eagles and Kalamunda Eastern Suns respectively.

After drawing interest from overseas scouts, Majok moved to the United States and played two years of high school ball at Northfield Mount Hermon School in Massachusetts.

== College career ==
Majok played two seasons in junior college at Midland College in Texas before transferring to Ball State University in Indiana. He played two seasons for the Cardinals, leading the MAC in rebounding and earning third-team all-conference honors in both years. As a senior in 2013–14, he averaged 11.2 points and 10 rebounds per game to become the first Ball State player to average a double-double in a season since Theron Smith in 2001–02.

== Professional career ==
After college, Majok moved to Slovenia and joined Helios Suns for the 2014–15 season. In 32 games, he averaged 6.9 points and 6.2 rebounds per game.

After feeling homesick, Majok returned to Australia and signed with Melbourne United of the National Basketball League on 9 July 2015. He helped Melbourne win the minor premiership in 2015–16 with a league-best 18–10 record while averaging 5.5 points and 7.1 rebounds per game. He averaged 5.7 points and 5.9 rebounds in 2016–17.

On 21 April 2017, Majok re-signed with United for the 2017–18 NBL season. During the offseason, he participated in a mini-camp with the Dallas Mavericks before their 2017 NBA Summer League. In March 2018, he was a member of United's championship-winning team. Injuries restricted much of his season, and in 22 games, he averaged 2.7 points and 2.7 rebounds per game.

On 16 April 2018, Majok signed with the Wellington Saints for the 2018 New Zealand NBL season.

On 4 May 2018, Majok signed a one-year deal with the New Zealand Breakers.

On 10 March 2019, Majok signed with the Frankston Blues for the 2019 NBL1 season.

On 8 July 2019, Majok signed a two-year deal with the Perth Wildcats. In March 2020, he was crowned an NBL champion for the second time in his career. In June 2020, the Wildcats exercised the club option on Majok's contract to retain him for the 2020–21 NBL season. However, in November 2020, he was ruled out for the season after suffering an Achilles tendon injury at team training. In March 2021, the Wildcats won the mid-season NBL Cup.

On 6 July 2021, Majok re-signed with the Wildcats on a two-year deal. He averaged 5.3 points and 5.2 rebounds in 28 games during the 2021–22 NBL season.

In July 2022, Majok joined the Warwick Senators of the NBL1 West for the rest of the 2022 season.

Majok returned to the Wildcats for the 2022–23 NBL season and then played for the North Gold Coast Seahawks of the NBL1 North during the 2023 NBL1 season.

On 7 August 2023, Majok signed with the Tasmania JackJumpers as a nominated replacement player (NRP) ahead of the 2023–24 NBL season. On 5 January 2024, his NRP contract came to an end and he was re-assigned to a training player. He did not play for the JackJumpers during the season but was a member of their championship-winning squad in March 2024, becoming a three-time NBL champion.

Majok joined the Ballarat Miners of the NBL1 South for the 2024 season.

On 15 August 2024, Majok signed with the South East Melbourne Phoenix for the 2024–25 NBL season.

Majok re-joined the Ballarat Miners for the 2025 NBL1 South season.

In February 2026, Majok signed with the Albury Wodonga Bandits of the NBL1 East for the 2026 season.

== National team career ==
In June 2017, Majok was named in a 20-man Australian national team squad ahead of the 2017 FIBA Asia Cup.
