= Morgan City High School =

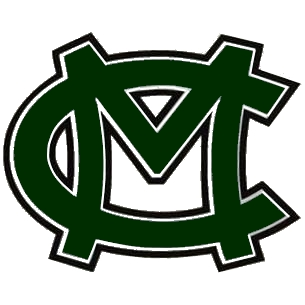

Location
- 2400 Tiger Drive; Morgan City, Louisiana 70380; United States; 29.71695°N 91.20409°W

Information
- Type: Public
- School district: St. Mary Parish School Board
- Principal: Lacie Quintanilla
- Staff: 49.51 (FTE)
- Enrollment: 711 (2023-2024)
- Student to teacher ratio: 14.36
- Colors: Green and White
- Mascot: Tiger
- Nickname: Tigers
- Website: mchs.stmaryk12.net

Morgan City High School is a public secondary school located in Morgan City, Louisiana, United States. It is operated by the St. Mary Parish School Board.

The school colors are green and white. The school opened in 1911 and celebrated its centennial year in 2011. MCHS was rated as a Bronze Medal School in the 2015 U.S. News & World Report "Best High Schools" rankings.

== Athletics ==
Morgan City High athletics competes in the LHSAA.

=== Championships ===
Football championships

- (4) State Championships: 1913, 1922, 1923, 1957

Baseball championship

- (1) State Championships: 1973

Cross country championship

- (1) State Championships: 1974

Softball championships

- (1) State Championship: 1984

== Notable alumni ==
- Eddie Dyer (1899–1964), baseball player and manager
- Urban Henry (1935–1979), football player
- Shawn Long, basketball player
- Merlin O'Neill, US Coast Guard Admiral and tenth Commandant of the Coast Guard
- M. David Stirling, lawyer and politician
- Vernon Norwood, track and field athlete
