= Rhys Vague =

Australian basketball player

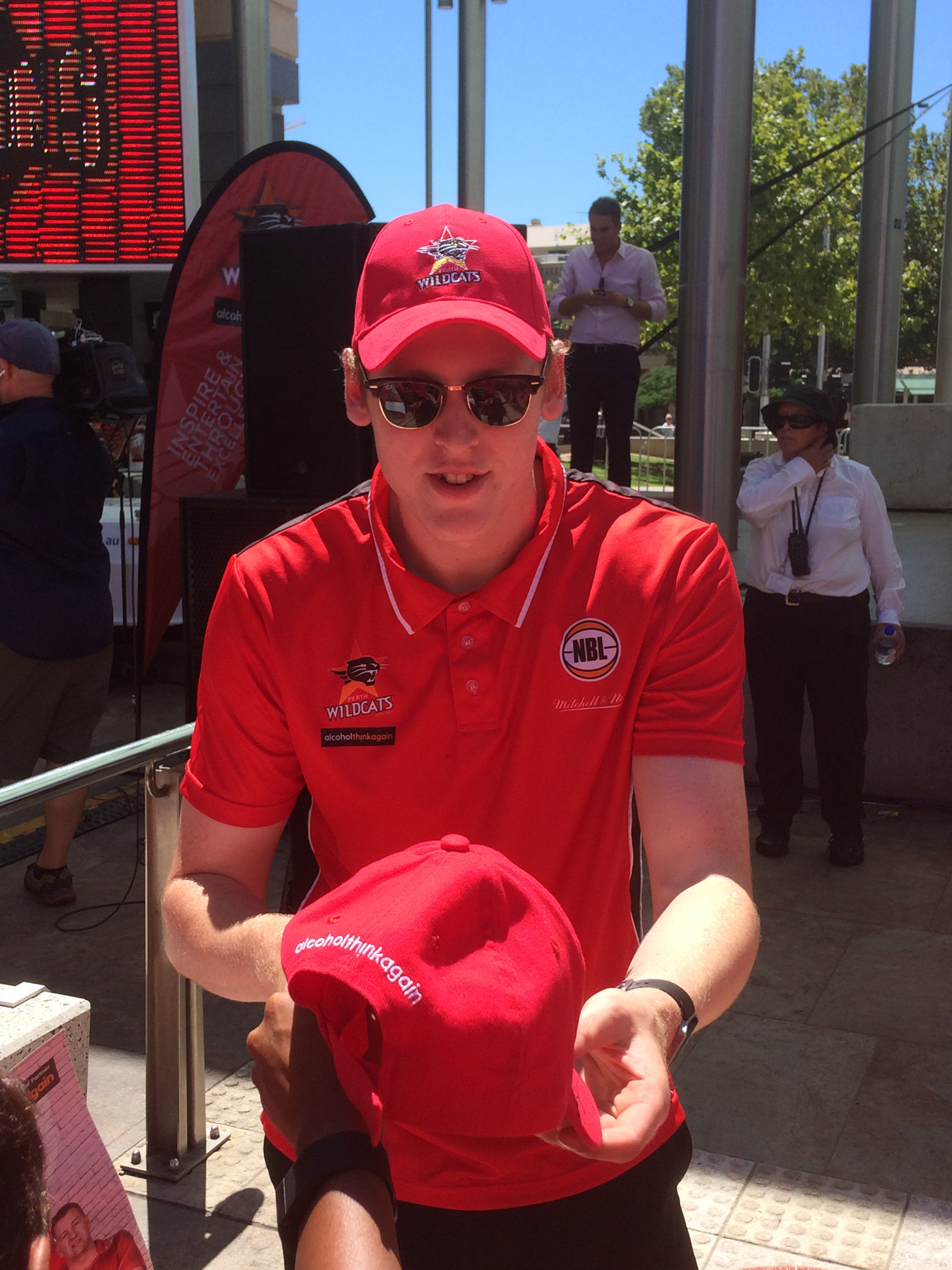
- Vague with the Perth Wildcats in 2017

Tokyo Hachioji Bee Trains
- Position: Forward
- League: B.League

Personal information
- Born: 17 January 1996 (age 30)
- Listed height: 206 cm (6 ft 9 in)
- Listed weight: 104 kg (229 lb)

Career information
- High school: Willetton Senior (Perth, Western Australia)
- Playing career: 2013–present

Career history
- 2013–2014: Cockburn Cougars
- 2014: BA Centre of Excellence
- 2014–2020: Perth Wildcats
- 2015–2016: East Perth Eagles
- 2017: Stirling Senators
- 2018: Dandenong Rangers
- 2019: Nelson Giants
- 2020–2023: Kagawa Five Arrows
- 2021: Hawke's Bay Hawks
- 2023–2024: South East Melbourne Phoenix
- 2024: Cockburn Cougars
- 2024–2026: Tokyo United
- 2026–present: Tokyo Hachioji Bee Trains

Career highlights
- 4× NBL champion (2016, 2017, 2019, 2020); SBL Most Improved Player (2015)
Medals
Men's basketball
Representing Australia
FIBA Asia Cup
Gold medal – first place	2022 Jakarta

Rhys Anthony Vague (born 17 January 1996) is an Australian professional basketball player for Tokyo Hachioji Bee Trains of the B.League. He made his debut for his hometown Perth Wildcats in the National Basketball League (NBL) as a development player in 2014. After four seasons as a development player, he was elevated to a fully contracted player in 2018. In his six seasons with the Wildcats, he was a part of four championship teams in 2016, 2017, 2019 and 2020. Vague also made a name for himself in the State Basketball League (SBL), playing for the Cockburn Cougars, East Perth Eagles and Stirling Senators, earning the State Basketball League Most Improved Player Award in 2015. Between 2020 and 2023, he played in Japan for the Kagawa Five Arrows.

== Early life and career ==
Vague grew up in Perth, Western Australia, in the suburb of Kardinya. He played his first game of basketball at the age of seven, starting at the Spearwood Hawks Junior Basketball Club before joining the Cockburn Cougars junior program. He is also a product of the rich basketball program at Willetton Senior High School.

In 2013, Vague debuted for the Cockburn Cougars in the State Basketball League (SBL) at the age of 17. He appeared in two games in his first season. He continued on with the Cougars in 2014 and averaged 3.7 points and 2.8 rebounds in 16 games. He also had a three-game stint with the BA Centre of Excellence in the South East Australian Basketball League (SEABL) midway through the year.

== Professional career ==
In 2014, Vague began training with the Perth Wildcats of the National Basketball League (NBL) during pre-season before earning selection as a development player for the 2014–15 season. He made his debut for the Wildcats on 24 October 2014, receiving 45 seconds of action deep into the game against the Sydney Kings, a match the Wildcats won 84–63. Vague was active for three more games but did not appear in any further action.

Following the NBL season, Vague joined the East Perth Eagles for the 2015 SBL season. In 22 games, he averaged 18.2 points, 10.0 rebounds and 2.1 assists per game. He was subsequently named the SBL's Most Improved Player.

Vague appeared in six games for the Wildcats during the 2015–16 NBL season and was a member of their championship-winning squad. He subsequently re-joined the Eagles for the 2016 SBL season and averaged 19.0 points, 11.0 rebounds and 3.2 assists in 26 games.

Vague received no game time in the 2016–17 NBL season but earned back-to-back championships with the Wildcats. He subsequently joined the Stirling Senators for the 2017 SBL season and averaged 18.0 points, 8.29 rebounds and 3.18 assists in 28 games.

With the Wildcats in 2017–18, Vague appeared in 13 games and averaged 1.5 points. He subsequently joined the Dandenong Rangers in the 2018 SEABL season and averaged 15.8 points, 7.7 rebounds and 1.7 assists in 19 games.

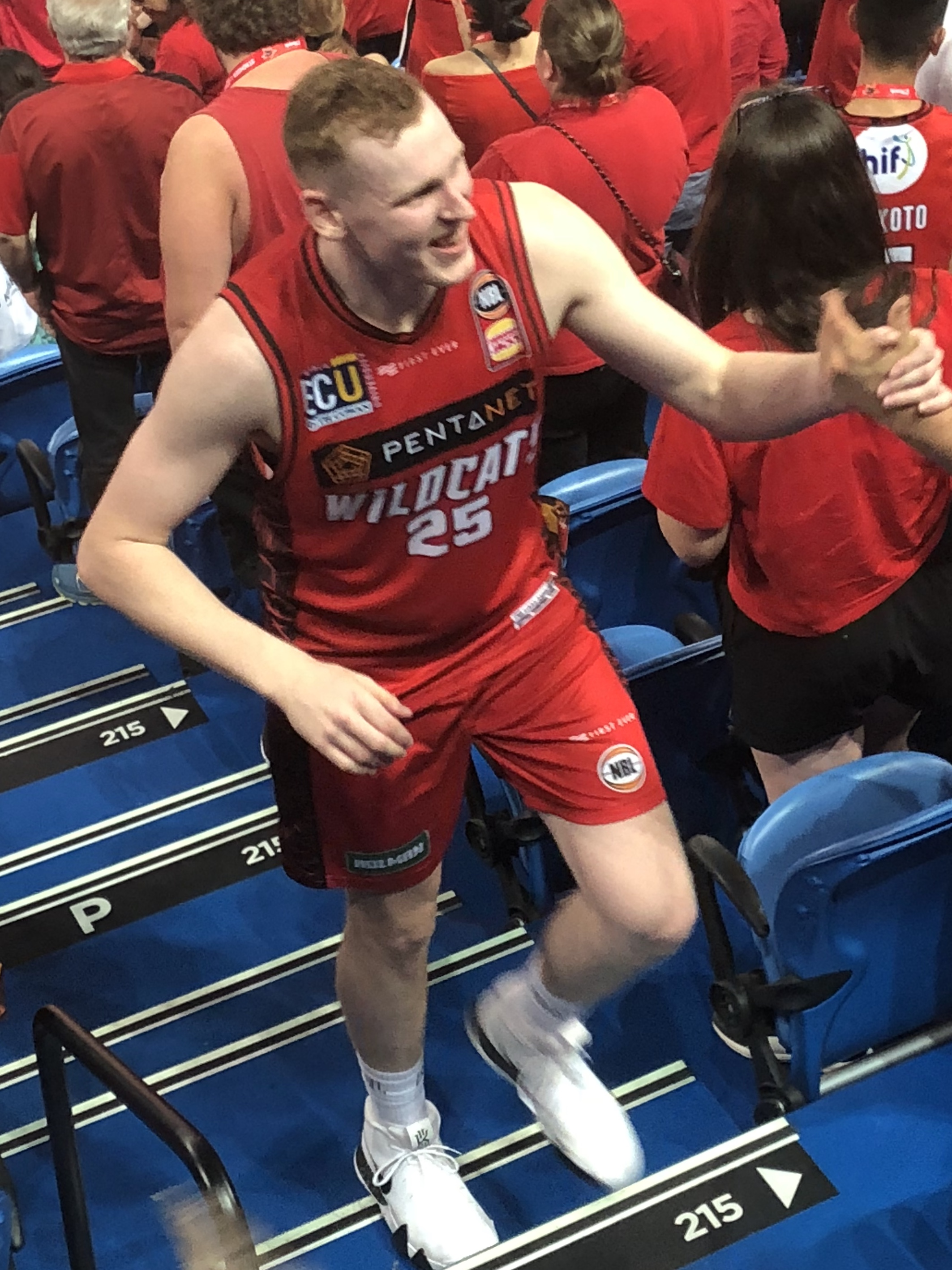
Vague with the Wildcats in November 2018

On 19 April 2018, Vague signed a two-year deal with the Wildcats, earning elevation to the team's full-time roster after four years as a development player. On 17 January 2019, on his 23rd birthday, Vague made his first career start and had 10 points, five rebounds and four assists in 25 minutes in a 97–84 loss to the Adelaide 36ers. In March 2019, he was a member of the Wildcats' championship-winning team.

Vague joined the Nelson Giants for the 2019 New Zealand NBL season and averaged 16.8 points, 8.5 rebounds and 2.2 assists in 18 games.

With the Wildcats in 2019–20, Vague won his fourth NBL championship.

In July 2020, Vague signed with the Kagawa Five Arrows of the Japanese B.League for the 2020–21 season. In 50 games, he averaged 10.0 points, 8.8 rebounds and 1.8 assists per game. He subsequently joined the Hawke's Bay Hawks for the 2021 New Zealand NBL season.

On 18 June 2021, Vague re-signed with the Five Arrows for the 2021–22 season. He averaged 12.8 points per game.

On 8 June 2022, Vague re-signed with the Five Arrows for the 2022–23 season.

On 24 April 2023, Vague signed a two-year deal with the South East Melbourne Phoenix of the NBL. On 28 March 2024, he was released by the Phoenix.

Vague joined the Cockburn Cougars for the 2024 NBL1 West season.

On 9 July 2024, Vague signed with Tokyo United, returning to the B.League for a second stint. He averaged 13.6 points, 6.5 rebounds and 2.6 assists in 27.2 minutes with 36% three-point shooting.

On 29 May 2025, Vague re-signed with Tokyo United.

On 4 August 2026, Vague signed with Tokyo Hachioji Bee Trains for the 2026–27 B.League One season.

== National team career ==
In December 2013, Vague won a silver medal with Australia at the FIBA Oceania Pacific Championships in New Zealand.

In December 2014, Vague won a gold medal with the Australian Emus at the FIBA Oceania Under 19 Championships in Fiji. In April 2015, he was named in a 16-man Australian Emus squad in the lead up to the 2015 FIBA Under-19 World Championships in Greece, but ultimately missed out on the final squad.

In June 2017, Vague was named in the 12-man Emerging Boomers squad for the 2017 Summer Universiade in Taiwan. The team consisted of players under the age of 25 who were completing university studies.

In February 2022, Vague was named in a 17-man Australian Boomers squad ahead of the FIBA World Cup Qualifiers in Japan. He re-joined the team for proceeding qualifying windows in August 2022 and February 2023.
