= Clint Steindl =

Australian basketball player (born 1989)

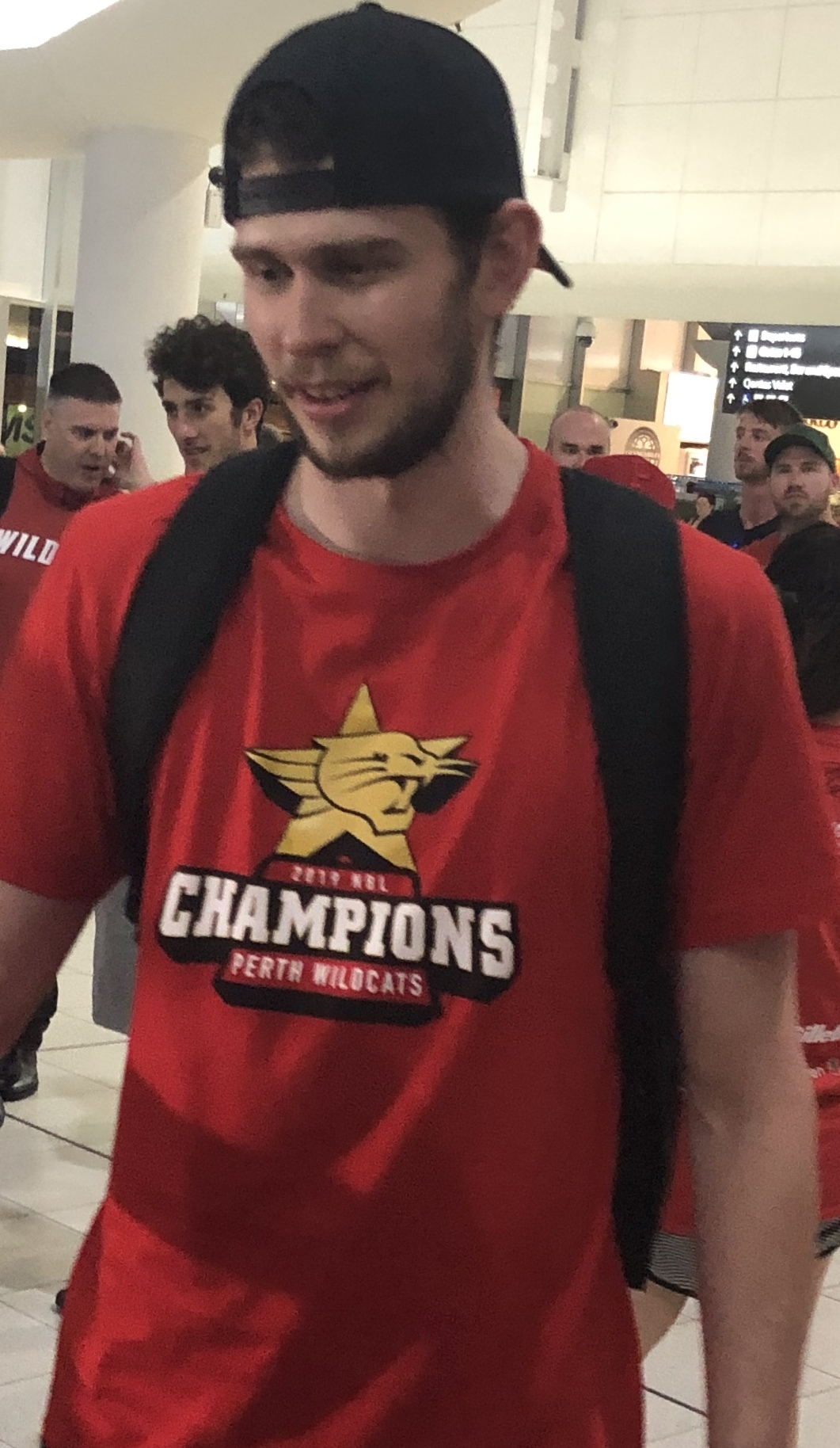
- Steindl in 2019

Personal information
- Born: 15 March 1989 (age 37) Mackay, Queensland, Australia
- Listed height: 200 cm (6 ft 7 in)
- Listed weight: 89 kg (196 lb)

Career information
- High school: Anglican Church Grammar School (Brisbane, Queensland)
- College: Saint Mary's (2008–2012)
- NBA draft: 2012: undrafted
- Playing career: 2007–2025
- Position: Small forward / shooting guard

Career history
- 2007–2008: Australian Institute of Sport
- 2012–2014: Cairns Taipans
- 2014–2015: Mackay Meteors
- 2014–2016: Townsville Crocodiles
- 2016–2017: Leuven Bears
- 2017: Panionios
- 2017–2021: Perth Wildcats
- 2018: Cockburn Cougars
- 2019: Perry Lakes Hawks
- 2021–2025: Tasmania JackJumpers
- 2024: Hobart Chargers

Career highlights
- 3× NBL champion (2019, 2020, 2024); NBL Cup winner (2021); NBL Most Improved Player (2016)
Medals
Men's basketball
Representing Australia
FIBA Asia Cup
Gold medal – first place	2022 Jakarta

Clinton Harold Steindl (born 15 March 1989) is an Australian former professional basketball player who played 12 seasons in the National Basketball League (NBL). He played college basketball in the United States for the Saint Mary's Gaels before debuting in the NBL in 2012 with the Cairns Taipans. After two seasons with the Taipans, he spent two seasons with the Townsville Crocodiles and won the NBL Most Improved Player in 2016. After stints in Belgium and Greece, he joined the Perth Wildcats in 2017, going on to win two NBL championships in 2019 and 2020. He won his third NBL championship in 2024 with the JackJumpers. He also represented the Australian national team. He retired from professional basketball in February 2025.

== Early life and career ==
Steindl was born and raised in Mackay, Queensland, before moving to Brisbane for high school, where he attended Anglican Church Grammar School.

In 2007 and 2008, Steindl attended the Australian Institute of Sport (AIS) in Canberra, where he played for the AIS men's team in the South East Australian Basketball League (SEABL).

== College career ==
In 2008, Steindl moved to the United States to play college basketball for the Saint Mary's Gaels. In 122 games over four seasons, he made 70 starts and averaged 6.2 points and 2.4 rebounds in 20.6 minutes per game.

As a senior in 2011–12, Steindl began the season in the starting lineup, but had to miss three games in the middle of the season after injuring his ankle against Missouri State. When he returned, his starting spot had been claimed. Left to come off the bench, Steindl operated as a 3-point specialist and defensive stopper. An injury to Stephen Holt in February led to Steindl moving back into the starting lineup. In the five games during Holt's absence, Steindl averaged 12.2 points per game. In three of those five games, he led the Gaels in scoring. His roommates as a senior were fellow Australians Matthew Dellavedova and Mitchell Young.

=== College statistics ===
Year	Team	GP	GS	MPG	FG%	3P%	FT%	RPG	APG	SPG	BPG	PPG
2008–09	Saint Mary's	24	0	9.0	.333	.333	.800	1.0	.2	.0	.0	2.7
2009–10	Saint Mary's	34	26	23.8	.415	.377	.813	2.6	1.1	.6	.1	6.9
2010–11	Saint Mary's	34	30	23.0	.427	.423	.615	2.7	1.0	.4	.2	6.6
2011–12	Saint Mary's	30	14	23.5	.408	.420	.938	2.9	.9	.6	.2	7.9
Career		122	70	20.6	.408	.400	.828	2.4	.8	.4	.2	6.2

== Professional career ==
=== NBL and Europe ===
Steindl joined the Cairns Taipans of the National Basketball League for the 2011–12 season. He averaged 4.1 points in his first season and 7.4 points in the 2013–14 season.

Steindl joined the Townsville Crocodiles for the 2014–15 NBL season, where he averaged 9.6 points in 28 games. He returned to the Crocodiles for the 2015–16 season and won the NBL Most Improved Player Award. In 28 games, he averaged 12.7 points per game.

For the 2016–17 season, Steindl joined the Leuven Bears of the Belgian Pro Basketball League. In 26 games, he averaged 12.8 points per game.

During the 2017 pre-season, Stint trained and played with the Perth Wildcats of the NBL. He later joined Greek team Panionios for the 2017–18 season, but appeared in just three games before returning to Australia. He reunited with the Wildcats in November 2017 and averaged 2.8 points in 23 games during the 2017–18 NBL season.

Steindl re-joined the Wildcats for the 2018–19 NBL season and won his first NBL championship. In 34 games, he averaged 6.9 points per game.

On 6 April 2019, Steindl re-signed with the Wildcats on a two-year deal. In March 2020, he was crowned an NBL champion for the second year in a row.

In January 2021, Steindl played his 200th NBL game. On 19 May 2021, he scored a career-high-tying 25 points with six 3-pointers in a 91–88 loss to the Brisbane Bullets. He helped the Wildcats reach the 2021 NBL Grand Final series, but was hampered by a groin injury during the series, as the Wildcats lost 3–0 to Melbourne United. He parted ways with the Wildcats following the season.

On 5 July 2021, Steindl signed a two-year deal with the Tasmania JackJumpers, a new franchise entering the NBL for the first time in 2021–22. He was named the JackJumpers' inaugural captain.

Steindl missed the first six weeks of the 2022–23 NBL season due to stress fractures in his shins. On 16 November 2022, he signed a two-year contract extension with the JackJumpers.

Steindl returned for his third season as captain of the JackJumpers in 2023–24. In November 2023, he played his 300th NBL game. He went on to help the JackJumpers win the NBL championship with a 3–2 grand final series victory over Melbourne United. It marked his third career NBL championship.

In January 2025, Steindl played his 350th NBL game.

On 14 February 2025, Steindl announced his retirement from professional basketball after a 356-game NBL career. He hit 519 three-pointers in his career, ranking seventh most in the 40-minute era.

=== State leagues ===
In 2014, Steindl played for the Mackay Meteors in the Queensland Basketball League (QBL), averaging 13.6 points in 17 games. He returned for a four-game stint with the Meteors in 2015.

In 2018, Steindl joined the Cockburn Cougars of the State Basketball League (SBL). He suffered a fractured left wrist in just his second game.

In 2019, Steindl played for the Perry Lakes Hawks in the SBL.

In 2024, Steindl played for the Hobart Chargers of the NBL1 South.

== National team career ==
Steindl was selected to compete on the Australian under-19 squad that toured France in 2007. In 2011, he made his debut for the senior national team, the Australian Boomers. In 2013, he won gold at the Stanković Cup and silver at the World University Games.

In June 2022, Steindl was named in the Boomers' World Cup Qualifiers team.

== Personal life ==
Steindl's wife is former Perth Lynx player Kayla Standish. The couple have two children.

As of February 2025, Steindl was completing his master's degree in teaching at the University of Tasmania.
