= Shawn Long =

American basketball player (born 1993)

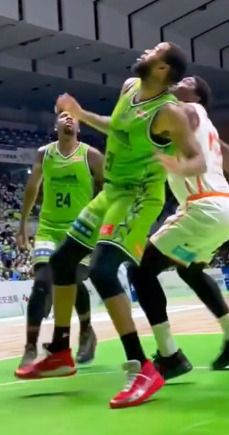

No. 36 – Busan KCC Egis
- Position: Power forward / center
- League: Korean Basketball League

Personal information
- Born: January 29, 1993 (age 33) Morgan City, Louisiana, U.S.
- Listed height: 6 ft 9 in (2.06 m)
- Listed weight: 248 lb (112 kg)

Career information
- High school: Morgan City (Morgan City, Louisiana)
- College: Louisiana (2012–2016)
- NBA draft: 2016: undrafted
- Playing career: 2016–present

Career history
- 2016–2017: Delaware 87ers
- 2017: Philadelphia 76ers
- 2017: Xinjiang Flying Tigers
- 2017–2018: Delaware 87ers
- 2018–2019: New Zealand Breakers
- 2019: Guizhou Guwutang Tea
- 2019–2020: Melbourne United
- 2020–2021: Ulsan Mobis Phoebus
- 2021–2023: Levanga Hokkaido
- 2023–2024: Osaka Evessa
- 2024–2025: Ulsan Mobis Phoebus
- 2025–present: Busan KCC Egis

Career highlights
- KBL champion (2026); KBL Foreign MVP (2021); All-NBL Second Team (2019); All-NBA D-League Second Team (2017); NBA D-League All-Star (2017); AP Honorable Mention All-American (2016); Sun Belt Player of the Year (2016); 3× First-team All-Sun Belt (2014–2016); Second-team All-Sun Belt (2013); Sun Belt Freshman of the Year (2013)
- Stats at NBA.com
- Stats at Basketball Reference
Medals
Representing the United States
Pan American Games
Bronze medal – third place	2015 Toronto	National team

Shawn Michael Long (born January 29, 1993) is an American professional basketball player for the Busan KCC Egis of the Korean Basketball League (KBL). He played college basketball for the Louisiana Ragin' Cajuns and represented the United States at the 2015 Pan American Games in Toronto.

== High school career ==
Long attended Morgan City High School. As a senior, he averaged 21.4 points, 15.2 rebounds and 9.1 blocks, helping team to a 26–5 record. He was named district MVP, earned first team all-district honors for two straight year and was the district defensive player of the year as a senior.

== College career ==
Long originally enrolled at Mississippi State University of the Southeastern Conference, but became immediately unhappy with his choice. After the first semester, and without playing in any games, Long transferred to Louisiana–Lafayette and received an NCAA waiver to allow him to play the following season without sitting out the customary full year. Long first suited up for the Ragin' Cajuns in the 2012–13 season, averaging 15.5 points and 10.2 rebounds per game to earn Sun Belt Conference Freshman of the Year and second-team All-conference honors. Over his next two seasons, Long would again average a double-double and was named first-team All-Sun Belt both years.

For his senior season, Long was named the preseason Sun Belt Player of the Year. On January 23, 2016, in a game against the Troy Trojans, Long scored his 2,000th point and became the first player in school and conference history to record 2,000 points and 1,000 rebounds for his career. He was also selected for the National Association of Basketball Coaches (NABC) college All-Star game to be held at the 2016 Final Four in Houston.

== Professional career ==
=== Delaware and Philadelphia (2016–2017) ===
After going undrafted in the 2016 NBA draft, Long signed with the Philadelphia 76ers on July 8, 2016. He was waived by the 76ers on October 24 after appearing in seven preseason games. Five days later, he was acquired by the Delaware 87ers of the NBA Development League as an affiliate player of the 76ers. On January 6, 2017, Long had 45 points and 14 rebounds in a 129–105 win over the Erie BayHawks. He was selected to play in the 2017 NBA D-League All-Star Game. On March 6, 2017, he was called up by the 76ers, who signed him to a 10-day contract to help the team deal with numerous injuries. Philadelphia had to use an NBA hardship exemption in order to sign him as he made their roster stand at 16, one over the allowed limited of 15. He made his NBA debut that night, recording 13 points and seven rebounds in a 112–98 loss to the Milwaukee Bucks. On March 16, 2017, he signed a partially guaranteed, multiyear deal with the 76ers. Seven days later, in a 117–107 win over the Chicago Bulls, Long had 18 points in just his ninth career game.

On June 28, 2017, Long was traded to the Houston Rockets in exchange for a 2018 second-round pick and cash considerations. He was waived by the Rockets on September 26, 2017.

=== China and G League (2017–2018) ===
On October 10, 2017, Long signed a two-month contract with the Xinjiang Flying Tigers of the Chinese Basketball Association. He left the team in mid-November after averaging 12.7 points and 6.1 rebounds in seven games.

On December 18, 2017, Long was acquired by the Delaware 87ers of the NBA G League.

=== New Zealand Breakers and Guizhou Guwutang Tea (2018–2019) ===
On September 5, 2018, Long signed with the New Zealand Breakers for the 2018–19 NBL season. He averaged 18.3 points, 8.9 rebounds and 1.5 blocks per game and was named to the All-NBL Second Team.

On May 2, 2019, Long signed with the Guizhou Guwutang Tea of the Chinese NBL. He had a one-game stint with the team.

=== Melbourne United (2019–2020) ===
On May 30, 2019, Long signed with Melbourne United for the 2019–20 NBL season.

=== Ulsan Mobis Phoebus (2020–2021) ===
On June 16, 2020, Long signed with the Ulsan Mobis Phoebus of the Korean Basketball League (KBL). He averaged 21.3 points and 10.9 rebounds per game, ranking No. 1 in both scoring and rebounding. He was subsequently named the KBL's Foreign MVP for the 2020–21 season.

=== Levanga Hokkaido (2021–2023) ===
On June 18, 2021, Long signed with the Levanga Hokkaido of the B.League. On May 22, 2022, he re-signed with the Levanga Hokkaido.

=== Osaka Evessa (2023–2024) ===
On June 16, 2023, Long signed with the Osaka Evessa of the B.League.

=== Second stint with the Ulsan Mobis Phoebus (2024–present) ===
On June 14, 2024, Long rejoined the Ulsan Mobis Phoebus of the Korean Basketball League (KBL).

== National team career ==
Long represented the United States national team at the 2015 Pan American Games, where he won a bronze medal.

== Career statistics ==
Legend
GP	Games played	GS	Games started	MPG	Minutes per game
FG%	Field goal percentage	3P%	3-point field goal percentage	FT%	Free throw percentage
RPG	Rebounds per game	APG	Assists per game	SPG	Steals per game
BPG	Blocks per game	PPG	Points per game	**Bold**	Career high

=== NBA ===
==== Regular season ====
Year	Team	GP	GS	MPG	FG%	3P%	FT%	RPG	APG	SPG	BPG	PPG
2016–17	Philadelphia	18	0	12.7	.594	.412	.543	4.5	.8	.5	.5	8.2
Career		18	0	12.7	.594	.412	.543	4.5	.8	.5	.5	8.2

=== B.League ===
==== Regular season ====
Year	Team	GP	GS	MPG	FG%	3P%	FT%	RPG	APG	SPG	BPG	PPG
2021-22	Hokkaido	56	56	32.5	.573	.392	.676	10.5	2.5	1.1	1.0	25.0
Career		56	56	32.5	.573	.392	.676	10.5	2.5	1.1	1.0	25.0

Source: basketball-stats.de (Date: 27. May 2022)

== Personal life ==
Long's sister, Shelly, died in 2018 after suffering from an autoimmune disease.

== See also ==
- List of NCAA Division I men's basketball players with 2,000 points and 1,000 rebounds
