= 2019–20 NBL season =

Professional basketball season

- League: National Basketball League
- Season: 2019–20
- Duration: 3 October 2019 – 15 March 2020
- Games played: 126
- Teams: 9
- TV partners: Australia: SBS Viceland ESPN; New Zealand: Sky Sport; Online: SBS On Demand NBL TV Twitch Facebook Watch

Regular season
- Season champions: Sydney Kings
- Season MVP: (United States) Bryce Cotton (Perth)

Finals
- Champions: Perth Wildcats (10th title)
- Runners-up: Sydney Kings
- Semi-finalists: Cairns Taipans; Melbourne United
- Finals MVP: (United States) Bryce Cotton (Perth)

Statistical leaders
Points	(United States) Bryce Cotton (Perth)	22.5
Rebounds	(United States) Shawn Long (Melbourne)	9.4
Assists	(Brazil) Scott Machado (Cairns)	7.9
Efficiency	(Australia) Jordan Hunter (Sydney)	73%

Records
- Biggest home win: 45 points United 125–80 Kings (2 March 2020)
- Biggest away win: 23 points Wildcats 76–99 Taipans (18 October 2019); United 81–104 Kings (14 December 2019); Hawks 79–102 Kings (24 January 2020)
- Highest scoring: 224 points 36ers 113–111 Phoenix (13 December 2019)
- Winning streak: 6 games Melbourne United (2 – 29 November 2019); Sydney Kings (4 October – 4 November 2019); Brisbane Bullets (5 January – 7 February 2020)
- Losing streak: 10 games Illawarra Hawks (4 January – 15 February 2020)
- Highest attendance: 17,514 – Qudos Bank Arena; Kings vs Hawks (17 November 2019)
- Lowest attendance: 2,054 – ILT Stadium Southland; Breakers vs Wildcats (3 November 2019)
- Attendance: 896,408
- Average attendance: 6,903

NBL seasons
- ← 2018–19 2020–21 →
- All statistics correct as of 17 March 2020.

The 2019–20 NBL season was the 42nd season of the National Basketball League since its establishment in 1979. The Perth Wildcats became champions. They drew an average home attendance of 12,974, the highest in the 2019–20 NBL season.

== Teams ==
Nine teams competed in the 2019–20 Season with the addition of South East Melbourne Phoenix.

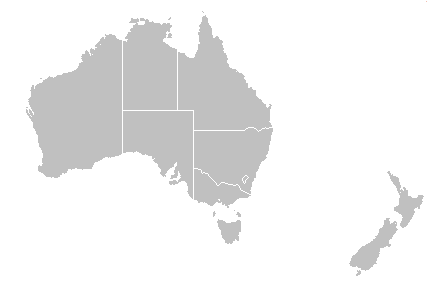

Team	Location	Coach	Captain	Stadium	Capacity	Founded	Main Sponsor
Adelaide 36ers	Adelaide	(United States) Joey Wright	(Australia) Brendan Teys (Australia) Kevin White	Adelaide Entertainment Centre	11,300	1982	Scouts Australia
Brisbane Bullets	Brisbane	(Australia) Andrej Lemanis	Rotating captaincy	Nissan Arena	5,000	1979	Tyrepower
Cairns Taipans	Cairns	(United States) Mike Kelly	(Australia) Nathan Jawai (United States) D. J. Newbill	Cairns Convention Centre	5,300	1999	CQUniversity
Illawarra Hawks	Wollongong	(Australia) Matt Flinn	(Australia) David Andersen (Australia) Todd Blanchfield	WIN Entertainment Centre	6,000	1979	SLAM Media Inc.
Illawarra Hawks	Wollongong	(Australia) Matt Flinn	(Australia) David Andersen (Australia) Todd Blanchfield	AIS Arena	5,200	1979	SLAM Media Inc.
Melbourne United	Melbourne	(Australia) Dean Vickerman	(Australia) Chris Goulding	Melbourne Arena	10,500	1984	SodaStream
New Zealand Breakers	Auckland	(Israel) Dan Shamir	(New Zealand) Thomas Abercrombie	Spark Arena	9,300	2003	Sky Sport
New Zealand Breakers	Auckland	(Israel) Dan Shamir	(New Zealand) Thomas Abercrombie	Eventfinda Stadium	4,400	2003	Sky Sport
New Zealand Breakers	Auckland	(Israel) Dan Shamir	(New Zealand) Thomas Abercrombie	ILT Stadium Southland	4,000	2003	Sky Sport
Perth Wildcats	Perth	(Australia) Trevor Gleeson	(Australia) Damian Martin	Perth Arena	14,800	1982	Pentanet
South East Melbourne Phoenix	Melbourne	(Australia) Simon Mitchell	(Australia) Mitch Creek (Australia) Adam Gibson	Melbourne Arena	10,500	2019	Dreamstreet Lending
South East Melbourne Phoenix	Melbourne	(Australia) Simon Mitchell	(Australia) Mitch Creek (Australia) Adam Gibson	State Basketball Centre	3,200	2019	Dreamstreet Lending
Sydney Kings	Sydney	(United States) Will Weaver	(Australia) Kevin Lisch	Qudos Bank Arena	18,200	1988	Hostplus

=== Off-season changes ===
- The South East Melbourne Phoenix joined the NBL.
- Will Weaver replaced Andrew Gaze as head coach of the Sydney Kings.
- Dan Shamir replaced Kevin Braswell as head coach of the New Zealand Breakers.
- Matt Flinn replaced Rob Beveridge as head coach of the Illawarra Hawks.

== Pre-season ==
The pre-season games started on 19 June 2019 and ended on 16 October 2019. The pre-season featured games in China, the Philippines and the United States, and featured the NBLxNBA 2019 Tour in which five NBL teams played a total of seven games.

=== Ladder ===
2019–20 NBL pre-season ladder
Ladder
Information

Pos.	Nat.	Name	Pld.	W.	L.	Last 5	Streak	Home	Away	For	Against	Pts %	Win %
1	(Australia)	Sydney	5	4	1	4–1	W3	1–0	3–1	486	394	123.35%	80.00%
2	(Australia)	Cairns	9	6	3	4–1	W4	3–1	3–2	811	763	106.29%	66.67%
3	(Australia)	S.E. Melbourne (NT)	9	6	3	4–1	W2	3–2	3–1	819	784	104.46%	66.67%
4	(Australia)	Melbourne	12	6	6	2–3	L2	4–3	2–3	1167	1095	106.58%	50.00%
5	(Australia)	Brisbane	8	4	4	3–2	W3	1–1	3–3	676	676	100.00%	50.00%
6	(Australia)	Illawarra	6	3	3	2–3	L2	1–1	2–2	598	631	94.77%	50.00%
7	(Australia)	Adelaide	10	4	6	1–4	L2	1–1	3–5	892	920	96.96%	40.00%
8	(Australia)	Perth (RC)	7	2	5	1–4	L1	1–2	1–3	625	671	93.14%	28.57%
9	(New Zealand)	New Zealand	6	1	5	0–5	L5	0–0	1–5	501	574	87.28%	16.67%

Total Rounds
11 weeks

Total Games
46 games

Legend
- (NT) New Team
- (RC) Reigning Champion

- Updated: 17 October 2019

==== NBL Blitz ladder ====
2019 NBL Blitz ladder
Ladder
Information

Pos.	Nat.	Name	Pld.	W.	L.	QW	Last 5	Streak	For	Against	Pts %	Win %	Pts.
1	(Australia)	Brisbane	2	2	0	6.5	2–0	W2	198	142	139.44%	100.00%	12.5
2	(Australia)	Cairns	2	2	0	5	2–0	W2	187	167	111.98%	100.00%	11
3	(Australia)	S.E. Melbourne (NT)	2	2	0	5	2–0	W2	198	182	108.79%	100.00%	11
4	(Australia)	Sydney	2	1	1	5	1–1	W1	190	167	113.77%	50.00%	8
5	(New Zealand)	New Zealand	2	1	1	5	1–1	L1	192	178	107.87%	50.00%	8
6	(Australia)	Melbourne	2	1	1	5	1–1	W1	186	188	98.94%	50.00%	8
7	(Australia)	Illawarra	2	1	1	1.5	1–1	L1	213	229	93.01%	50.00%	4.5
8	(Australia)	Adelaide (RC)	2	0	2	3.5	0–2	L2	184	192	95.83%	0.00%	3.5
9	(Australia)	Perth	2	0	2	2.5	0–2	L2	190	225	84.44%	0.00%	2.5
10	(Australia)	NBL1 All Stars (NT)	2	0	2	1	0–2	L2	125	193	64.77%	0.00%	1

Total Rounds
4 days
Games per Team
2
Total Games
10

Legend
- (NT) New Team
- (RC) Reigning Champion

- Updated: 22 September 2019

== Regular season ==
The 2019–20 regular season took place over 20 rounds between 3 October 2019 and 16 February 2020.

=== Ladder ===
Pos	2019–20 NBL season											
Pos	Team	Pld	W	L	PCT	Last 5	Streak	Home	Away	PF	PA	PP
1	Sydney Kings	28	20	8	71.43%	4–1	W2	12–2	8–6	2642	2472	106.88%
2	Perth Wildcats	28	19	9	67.86%	4–1	W3	11–3	8–6	2529	2409	104.98%
3	Cairns Taipans	28	16	12	57.14%	3–2	L2	11–3	5–9	2587	2547	101.57%
4	Melbourne United	28	15	13	53.57%	4–1	W3	9–5	6–8	2638	2560	103.05%
5	Brisbane Bullets	28	15	13	53.57%	3–2	W1	10–4	5–9	2607	2557	101.96%
6	New Zealand Breakers	28	15	13	53.57%	4–1	W4	9–5	6–8	2514	2468	101.86%
7	Adelaide 36ers	28	12	16	42.86%	1–4	L2	8–6	4–10	2654	2768	95.88%
8	S.E. Melbourne Phoenix	28	9	19	32.14%	0–5	L8	6–8	3–11	2671	2761	96.74%
9	Illawarra Hawks	28	5	23	17.86%	0–5	L10	3–11	2–12	2354	2654	88.70%

Updated to match(es) played on 16 February 2020. Source: NBL.com.au

The NBL tie-breaker system as outlined in the NBL Rules and Regulations states that in the case of an identical win–loss record, the overall points percentage between the teams will determine order of seeding.

^{1}Melbourne United won on overall points percentage. Brisbane Bullets finished 5th on overall points percentage.

=== Ladder progression ===
- Numbers highlighted in green indicate that the team finished the round inside the top four.
- Numbers highlighted in blue indicates the team finished first on the ladder in that round.
- Numbers highlighted in red indicates the team finished last place on the ladder in that round.

2019–20 NBL season
Team	1	2	3	4	5	6	7	8	9	10	11	12	13	14	15	16	17	18	19	20
Adelaide 36ers	–	8	4	4	5	6	6	5	5	6	4	5	5	5	5	7	7	7	7	7
Brisbane Bullets	2	4	5	5	4	5	5	6	7	7	7	7	8	7	6	5	4	4	5	5
Cairns Taipans	7	7	6	6	8	8	7	7	6	4	6	4	4	4	3	3	3	3	3	3
Illawarra Hawks	6	5	7	9	9	9	9	8	9	9	9	9	9	9	9	9	9	9	9	9
Melbourne United	5	6	8	8	6	4	3	3	4	3	3	3	3	3	4	4	5	6	6	4
New Zealand Breakers	–	–	9	7	7	7	8	9	8	8	8	8	7	6	8	6	6	5	4	6
Perth Wildcats	4	2	3	2	2	3	2	2	2	2	2	2	2	2	2	2	2	2	2	2
S.E. Melbourne Phoenix	3	3	2	3	3	2	4	4	3	5	5	6	6	8	7	8	8	8	8	8
Sydney Kings	1	1	1	1	1	1	1	1	1	1	1	1	1	1	1	1	1	1	1	1

== Finals ==
The 2020 NBL Finals were played in February and March 2020, consisting of two best-of-three semi-final series and a best-of-five Grand Final series. In the semi-finals, the higher seed hosted the first and third games. In the Grand Final, the higher seed hosts the first, third and fifth games.

Despite the threat of the COVID-19 pandemic and multiple other sporting events being cancelled due to the pandemic, the Grand Final series started on 8 March 2020. Beginning with Game 2, all remaining games would be played behind closed doors with no spectators. After Game 3, the Sydney Kings (who were trailing 2–1 in the series) announced that they would pull out of the Grand Final due to COVID-19 concerns. The NBL therefore cancelled the remainder of the series, and named the Perth Wildcats as NBL champions by default.

=== Playoff bracket ===
Semifinals
1	Sydney Kings	86	80	89
4	Melbourne United	80	125	87
2	Perth Wildcats	108	74	93
3	Cairns Taipans	107	85	82

Grand Final
1	Sydney Kings	86	97	96
2	Perth Wildcats	88	83	111

== Awards ==
=== Pre-season ===
- Most Valuable Player (Ray Borner Medal): John Roberson (South East Melbourne Phoenix)
- 3 Point Shootout: David Barlow (Melbourne United)
- Dunk Contest: Terry Armstrong (South East Melbourne Phoenix)

=== Regular season ===
==== Player of the Week ====
Rounds	Player	Team
Round 1	Mitch Creek	South East Melbourne Phoenix
Round 2	Bryce Cotton	Perth Wildcats
Round 3	Andrew Bogut	Sydney Kings
Round 4	Shawn Long	Melbourne United
Round 5	Jason Cadee	Brisbane Bullets
Round 6	LaMelo Ball	Illawarra Hawks
Round 7	Jerome Randle	Adelaide 36ers
Round 8	LaMelo Ball	Illawarra Hawks
Round 9	Cameron Oliver	Cairns Taipans
Round 10	Nick Kay	Perth Wildcats
Round 11	John Roberson	South East Melbourne Phoenix
Round 11	Jerome Randle	Adelaide 36ers
Round 12	Scotty Hopson	New Zealand Breakers
Round 13	Lamar Patterson	Brisbane Bullets
Round 14	Dane Pineau	South East Melbourne Phoenix
Round 15	Scott Machado	Cairns Taipans
Round 16	Scotty Hopson	New Zealand Breakers
Round 17	Miles Plumlee	Perth Wildcats
Round 18	Nick Kay	Perth Wildcats
Round 19	Cameron Oliver	Cairns Taipans
Round 20	Chris Goulding	Melbourne United

==== Awards night ====
- Most Valuable Player (Andrew Gaze Trophy): Bryce Cotton (Perth Wildcats)
- Rookie of the Year: LaMelo Ball (Illawarra Hawks)
- Best Defensive Player: D. J. Newbill (Cairns Taipans)
- Best Sixth Man: Jason Cadee (Brisbane Bullets)
- Most Improved Player: Will Magnay (Brisbane Bullets)
- Fans MVP: Scott Machado (Cairns Taipans)
- Coach of the Year (Lindsay Gaze Trophy): Mike Kelly (Cairns Taipans)
- Referee of the Year: Vaughan Mayberry
- GameTime by Kmart: Dane Pineau (South East Melbourne Phoenix)
- All-NBL First Team:
  - Scott Machado (Cairns Taipans)
  - Bryce Cotton (Perth Wildcats)
  - Lamar Patterson (Brisbane Bullets)
  - Jae'Sean Tate (Sydney Kings)
  - Nick Kay (Perth Wildcats)
- All-NBL Second Team:
  - Casper Ware (Sydney Kings)
  - D. J. Newbill (Cairns Taipans)
  - Scotty Hopson (New Zealand Breakers)
  - Cameron Oliver (Cairns Taipans)
  - Andrew Bogut (Sydney Kings)

=== Post-season ===
- Semi-finals MVP: Nick Kay (Perth Wildcats), Jae'Sean Tate (Sydney Kings)
- Grand Final Series MVP (Larry Sengstock Medal): Bryce Cotton (Perth Wildcats)

== Media ==
Australian Broadcast Rights to the 2019–20 season were held by SBS Viceland in the first year of a two-year deal. All 126 games were available live and free on streaming platforms such as SBS On Demand. ESPN also broadcast 59 games including all games after 7.30pm AEDT. In New Zealand, Sky Sport were the official league broadcaster. The NBL also became the first Australian sports body to broadcast their matches online with them signing a two-year deal with Twitch which included all pre-season games. The NBL also signed a deal with Facebook Watch, which broadcast 52 games across the season in the United States.
