= NBL Fans MVP Award =

Australian basketball award

The National Basketball League Fans MVP is an annual award from the Australian National Basketball League (NBL) with fans deciding on who receives the award. Bryce Cotton has won the award five times.

== Winners ==
Year	Player	Nationality	Team
2015–16	Jerome Randle	United States	Adelaide 36ers
2016–17	Jerome Randle (2)	United States	Adelaide 36ers
2017–18	Mitch Creek	Australia	Adelaide 36ers
2018–19	Bryce Cotton	United States	Perth Wildcats
2019–20	Scott Machado	Brazil	Cairns Taipans
2020–21	Bryce Cotton (2)	United States	Perth Wildcats
2021–22	Kai Sotto	Philippines	Adelaide 36ers
2022–23	Kai Sotto (2)	Philippines	Adelaide 36ers
2023–24	Bryce Cotton (3)	United States	Perth Wildcats
2024–25	Bryce Cotton (4)	United States	Perth Wildcats
2025–26	Bryce Cotton (5)	United States	Adelaide 36ers
