= Jerome Randle =

American-Ukrainian basketball player (born 1987)

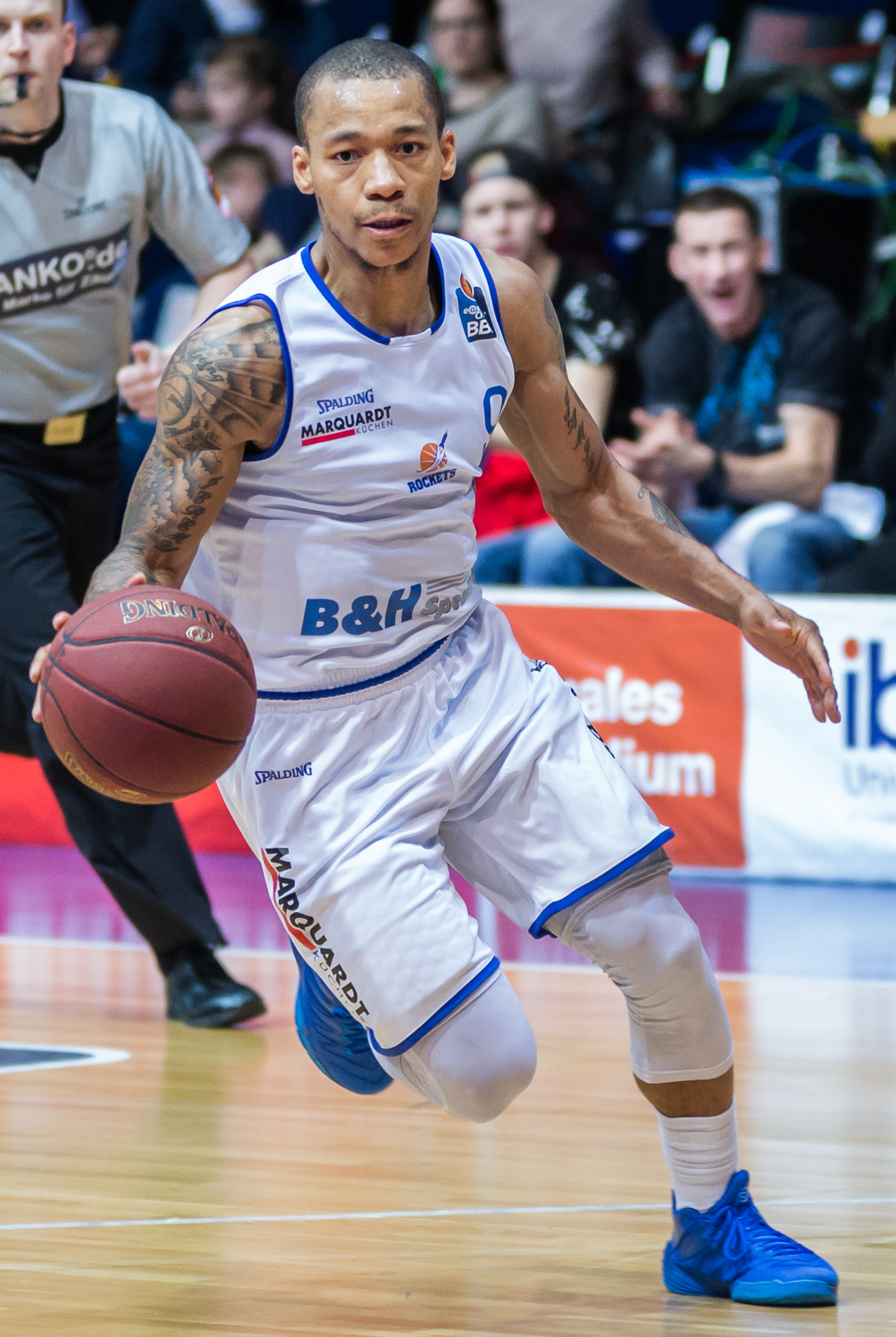
- Randle with Rockets Gotha in 2018

Personal information
- Born: May 21, 1987 (age 39) Chicago, Illinois, U.S.
- Listed height: 5 ft 9 in (1.75 m)
- Listed weight: 174 lb (79 kg)

Career information
- High school: Hales Franciscan (Chicago, Illinois)
- College: California (2006–2010)
- NBA draft: 2010: undrafted
- Playing career: 2010–2023
- Position: Point guard

Career history
- 2010–2011: Aliağa Petkim
- 2011: Türk Telekom
- 2011: Barak Netanya
- 2011: Texas Legends
- 2011–2012: Maine Red Claws
- 2012: Azovmash
- 2012–2013: Spirou Charleroi
- 2013–2014: Aliağa Petkim
- 2014: Trabzonspor
- 2014–2015: Eskişehir
- 2015–2017: Adelaide 36ers
- 2016: Žalgiris Kaunas
- 2017: Limoges CSP
- 2017: Bahçeşehir
- 2017–2019: Sydney Kings
- 2018: Rockets Gotha
- 2019: Lokomotiv Kuban
- 2019–2020: Adelaide 36ers
- 2020: Fuenlabrada
- 2021: Real Betis
- 2021–2022: BC Budivelnyk
- 2022: Metropolitans 92
- 2023: US Monastir

Career highlights
- Tunisian League champion (2023); Tunisian Cup winner (2023); NBL Most Valuable Player (2017); 2x NBL Fans MVP (2016, 2017); 2× All-NBL First Team (2016, 2017); 2× All-NBL Second Team (2018, 2019); 2× NBL scoring champion (2016, 2018); NBL assist champion (2018); LKL champion (2016); LKL Finals MVP (2016); Turkish League All-Star (2011); Fourth-team All-American - SN (2010); Pac-10 Player of the Year (2010); 2× First-team All-Pac-10 (2009, 2010)
- Stats at Basketball Reference

Jerome Jerry Randle (born May 21, 1987; ) is an American-Ukrainian former professional basketball player. He played college basketball for the California Golden Bears before playing professionally in several European countries. Randle has a Ukrainian passport and represented Ukraine at EuroBasket 2015.

While playing for the Golden Bears, Randle was a two-time first-team All-Pac-10 honoree and won the Pac-10 Player of the Year in 2010. He was named to the Pac-12 Hall of Honor in January 2017.

Randle began his National Basketball League (NBL) career in 2015 with the Adelaide 36ers. He was named to the All-NBL First Team in his first season and then went on to win a championship in Lithuania while earning LKL Finals MVP honors. In his second season with Adelaide, he was named the NBL's Most Valuable Player after helping the 36ers win the minor premiership. He spent the next two seasons with the Sydney Kings, before returning to Adelaide in 2019.

== High school career ==
Randle attended Hales Franciscan High School in Chicago, Illinois. In 2005, he won a pair of championships after guiding his high school team to a 27–4 record and the Illinois state title and helping his Chicago Ferrari team to the 17-and-under AAU national crown, earning tournament MVP honors after scoring 44 points in one tournament game. He averaged 12.3 points and 5.2 assists per game as a junior before increasing those averages to 25 points, 1.5 rebounds, 4 assists and 3 steals as senior in earning state Class A Player of the Year honors from the Chicago Sun-Times.

After considering signing with Tulsa, Randle committed to California in October 2005.

== College career ==
Randle was a three-year starter at the University of California, Berkeley, earning first-team All-Pacific-10 Conference in both his junior and senior years with the California Golden Bears. He was also named Pac-10 Player of the Year as a senior, and was named a third-team All-American by Sporting News and received honorable mention from the Associated Press. He finished his career at Cal as the school's all-time leading scorer with 1,835 career points. Randle also set school marks for three-pointers made with 252, and free throw accuracy at 88.1% for his career. In 2010, Randle led the program to its first conference title since 1960. Following his senior season, he was named a recipient of the Pacific-10 Tom Hansen Conference Medal, and earned the Most Outstanding Player honor of the 2010 Reese's College All-Star Game. In January 2017, he was named to the Pac-12 Hall of Honor.

== Professional career ==
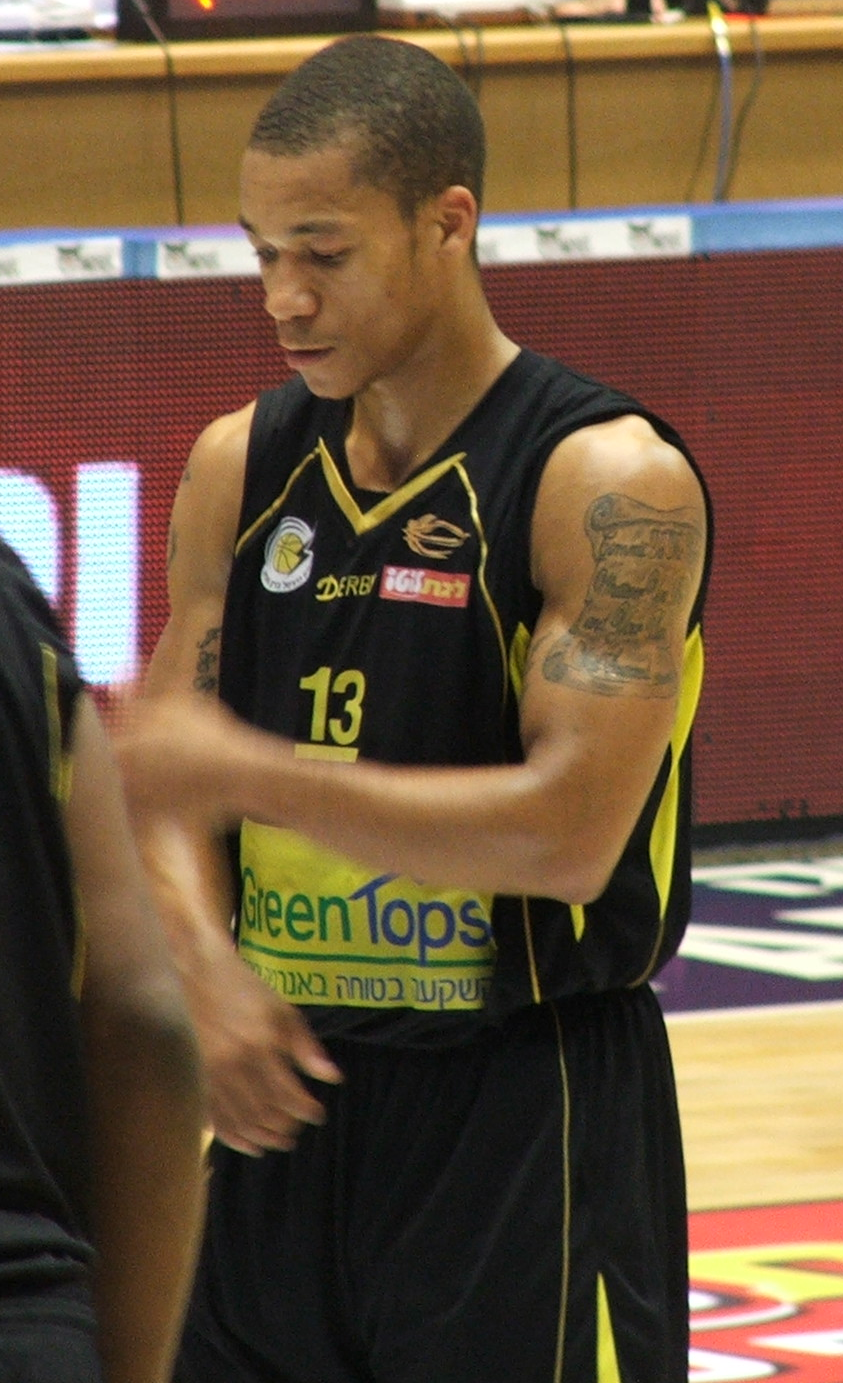
Randle with Barak Netanya in October 2011

After going undrafted in the 2010 NBA draft, Randle played for the Orlando Magic and Washington Wizards during the NBA Summer League. He went on to split the 2010–11 season in Turkey with Aliağa Petkim and Türk Telekom.

Randle began the 2011–12 season in Israel with Barak Netanya before returning to the United States and joining the Dallas Mavericks in December 2011 following the conclusion of the NBA lockout. He spent preseason with the Mavericks and then had a one-game stint with their D-League affiliate, the Texas Legends. On December 30, he was traded to the Maine Red Claws. In February 2012, he left the Red Claws and moved to Ukraine to play out the season with BC Azovmash.

After playing for the Memphis Grizzlies during the 2012 NBA Summer League, Randle initially signed in China with the Foshan Dralions, but a foot injury derailed his stint and thus did not debut. He later joined Belgian team Spirou Charleroi in late December 2012.

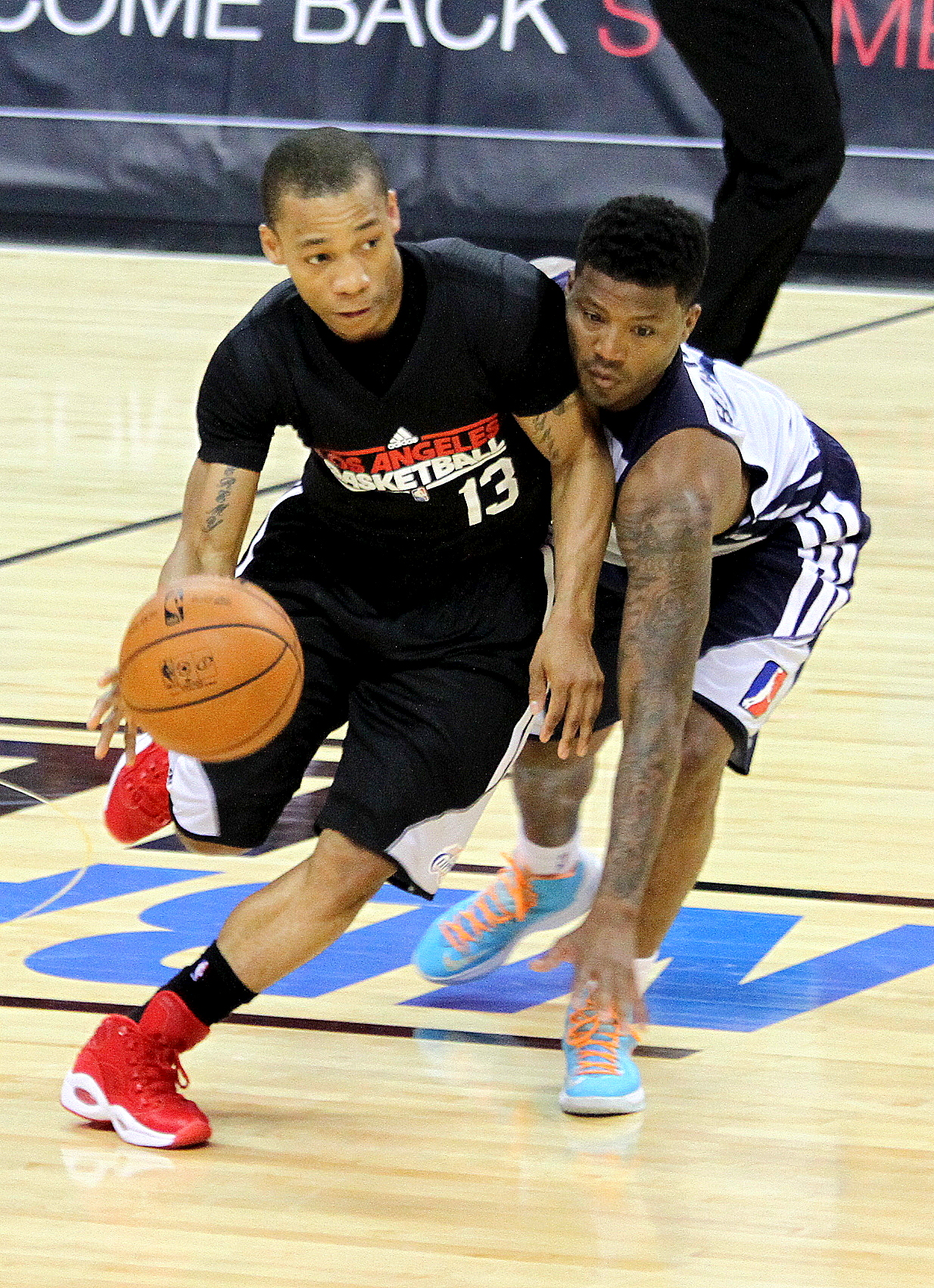
Randle with the Los Angeles Clippers during the 2013 NBA Summer League

After playing for the Los Angeles Clippers during the 2013 NBA Summer League, Randle split the 2013–14 season in Turkey with Aliağa Petkim and Trabzonspor. He returned to Trabzonspor for the 2014–15 season, but left the team in late October. In November 2014, he joined Eskişehir Basket for the rest of the season.

After playing for the Milwaukee Bucks during the 2015 NBA Summer League, Randle moved to Australia to play for the Adelaide 36ers in the 2015–16 NBL season. He scored 30 points or more three times, including having a 41-point effort on January 20 against the Sydney Kings. He led the league in scoring—the first 36er to do so—with 23.0 points per game and finished second in assists with 5.2, becoming only the second player in league history to finish top-two in points and assists, joining Andrew Gaze. He was named the inaugural NBL Australia Post Fan's MVP, and earned All-NBL First Team honors. Following the conclusion of the NBL season, Randle moved to Lithuania and helped Žalgiris Kaunas win the LKL championship behind his Finals MVP performance.

Randle returned to Adelaide for the 2016–17 NBL season. He scored 30 points or more four times, including a 40-point effort on November 5 against the Perth Wildcats. He helped the 36ers claim the minor premiership with a first-place finish and a 17–11 record. He was subsequently named the NBL's Most Valuable Player, becoming just the second 36ers player to be named MVP, joining Mark Davis in 1987. He was also named to his second consecutive All-NBL First Team, as well as winning the NBL Australia Post Fan's MVP for the second straight season. Following the conclusion of the NBL season, Randle moved to France to play out the season with Limoges CSP.

Randle started the 2017–18 season in Turkey with Bahçeşehir, but later joined the Sydney Kings in November 2017, returning to the NBL once again. For the season, Randle became the first player to lead the league in both points (19.78) and assists (5.26) per game since Andrew Gaze in 1989. He was named to the All-NBL Second Team. Following the conclusion of the NBL season, Randle moved to Germany to play out the season with Rockets Gotha.

Randle returned to Sydney for the 2018–19 NBL season, and battled through a glute injury. He once again earned All-NBL Second Team honors. Following the conclusion of the NBL season, Randle moved to Russia to play out the season with Lokomotiv Kuban.

After not being offered a new contract by the Sydney Kings, Randle reunited with the Adelaide 36ers ahead of the 2019–20 NBL season, signing a two-year deal on October 2, 2019. The 36ers opted out of the second year of Randle's contract at the conclusion of the 2019–20 season.

On February 27, 2020, Randle signed with Fuenlabrada of the Spanish Liga ACB. He ruptured his right ACL in his debut game for the team two days later and was ruled out for the rest of the season. On March 3, Fuenlabrada offered Randle a contract extension for the 2020–21 Liga ACB season.

On December 18, 2020, Randle signed with Real Betis of the Liga ACB. He averaged 9.0 points, 2.2 assists and 1.0 rebounds per game during the 2020–21 season.

In November 2021, Randle signed with BC Budivelnyk of the Ukrainian Basketball SuperLeague.

On April 9, 2022, he has signed with Metropolitans 92 of the LNB Pro A.

In January 2023, Randle signed with the Tunisian champions US Monastir. In 2023, he announced his retirement from his playing career after the 2022–23 season, while stating his intention to go into coaching. Randle finished his career by winning the Championnat Pro A and the Tunisian Cup with Monastir.

== National team career ==
For EuroBasket 2015, Randle replaced Pooh Jeter on the Ukrainian national team after obtaining a Ukrainian passport. In five games, he averaged 13.2 points, 2.0 rebounds and 4.4 assists per game.

== Personal life ==
Randle is married to wife Zhordan. Randle's younger brother, Jamie Adams, is also a professional basketball player.
