= Bryce Cotton =

American-Australian basketball player (born 1992)

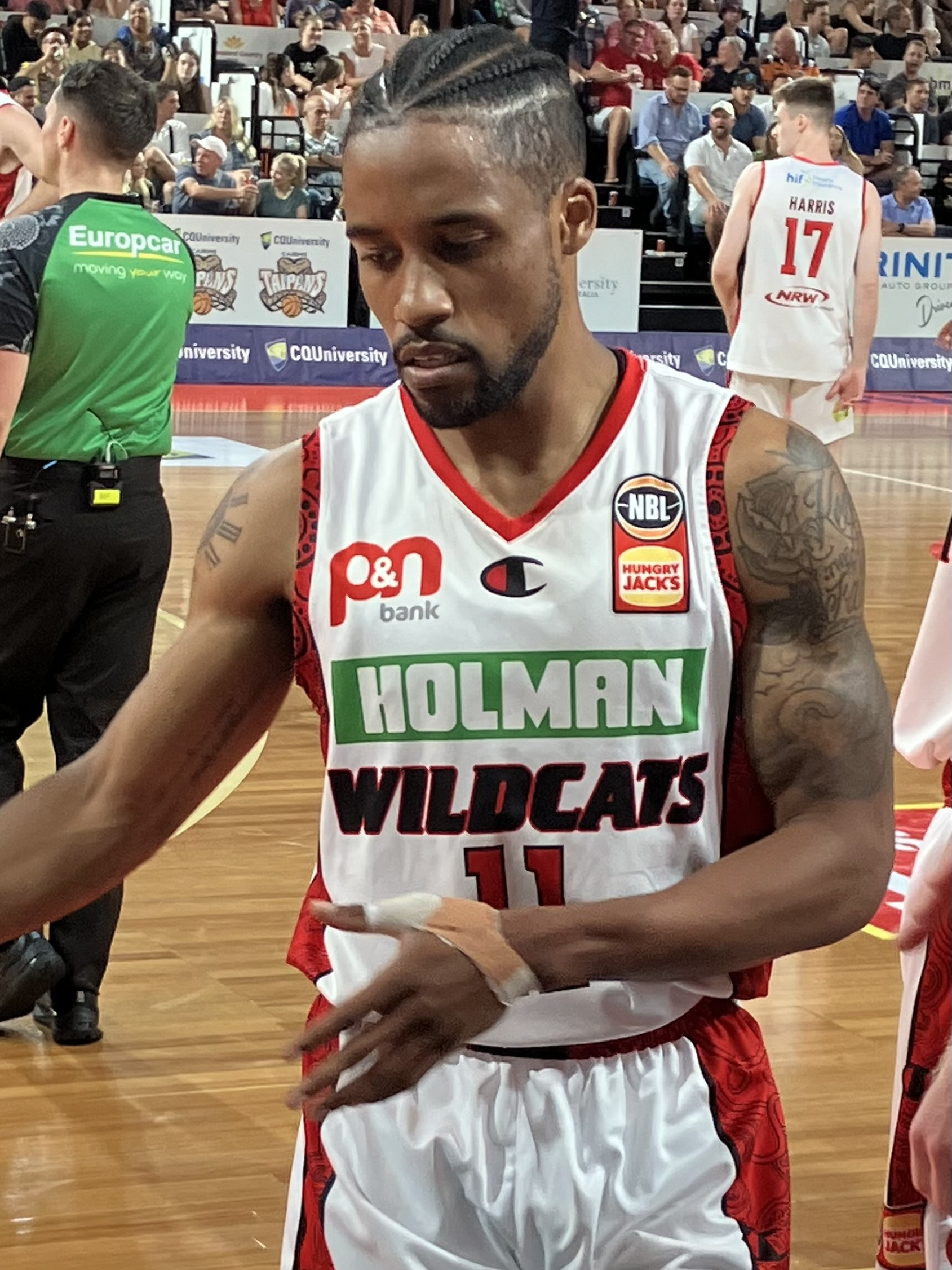
- Cotton with the Perth Wildcats in 2022

No. 11 – Adelaide 36ers
- Position: Point guard
- League: NBL

Personal information
- Born: August 11, 1992 (age 34) Tucson, Arizona, U.S.
- Listed height: 182 cm (6 ft 0 in)
- Listed weight: 76 kg (168 lb)

Career information
- High school: Palo Verde (Tucson, Arizona)
- College: Providence (2010–2014)
- NBA draft: 2014: undrafted
- Playing career: 2014–present

Career history
- 2014–2016: Austin Spurs
- 2015: Utah Jazz
- 2015–2016: Phoenix Suns
- 2016: Xinjiang Flying Tigers
- 2016: Memphis Grizzlies
- 2016: Anadolu Efes
- 2017–2025: Perth Wildcats
- 2018: Brescia Leonessa
- 2025: Mets de Guaynabo
- 2025–present: Adelaide 36ers

Career highlights
- 3× NBL champion (2017, 2019, 2020); NBL Cup winner (2021); 2× NBL Grand Final MVP (2017, 2020); 6× NBL Most Valuable Player (2018, 2020, 2021, 2024–2026); 5× NBL Fans MVP (2019, 2021, 2024–2026); 9× All-NBL First Team (2018–2026); 9× NBL scoring champion (2017, 2019–2026); NBA D-League All-Star (2015); All-NBA D-League Second Team (2015); NBA D-League All-Rookie First Team (2015); 2× First-team All-Big East (2013, 2014); Big East tournament MVP (2014)
- Stats at NBA.com
- Stats at Basketball Reference

Bryce Jiron Cotton (born August 11, 1992) is an American-Australian professional basketball player for the Adelaide 36ers of the Australian National Basketball League (NBL). As a member of the Perth Wildcats between 2017 and 2025, he won three NBL championships and five NBL Most Valuable Player Awards. In 2026, he won his sixth NBL MVP as a member of the 36ers. He is also a two-time NBL Grand Final MVP, nine-time All-NBL First Team recipient, and has collected nine NBL scoring titles.

Cotton played college basketball for four seasons with the Providence Friars, where he was a two-time first-team All-Big East honoree in 2013 and 2014. After going undrafted in the 2014 NBA draft, Cotton had a number of short stints in the NBA over his first two professional seasons, playing for the Utah Jazz, Phoenix Suns and Memphis Grizzlies. He also played in the NBA Development League, China, Turkey and Italy between 2014 and 2018.

Cotton arrived in Australia to play for the Wildcats midway through the 2016–17 NBL season, going on to lead Perth to the NBL championship in the 2017 NBL Finals behind a grand final MVP performance. After winning his first league MVP in 2018, he won his second and third NBL championships in 2019 and 2020 while also garnering his second NBL MVP and second grand final MVP in 2020. He won his third, fourth and fifth NBL MVPs in 2021, 2024 and 2025 respectively. In 2025, he set a club record with his seventh Wildcats Club MVP.

After nine seasons with the Wildcats, Cotton joined the Adelaide 36ers in 2025 and in the 2025–26 season, he collected his sixth NBL MVP, coming within one of Andrew Gaze's all-time best seven league MVPs.

In 2025, Cotton became an Australian citizen. The following year, he debuted for the Australia men's national basketball team.

== Early life ==
Cotton was born and raised in Tucson, Arizona. His parents separated when he was a toddler and his father worked as a police officer on the other side of the country. He reconnected with his father in New York while in college. His uncle, former NFL player David Adams, often provided the family with financial assistance during tough times. Cotton's grandmother, Mary, helped raise him and his brother Justin while their mother worked in real estate.

Cotton loved sports as a child, playing basketball, football and baseball. He was advised during fifth grade to no longer play football due to the high risk of head injuries which could lead to seizures. He was diagnosed with a rare form of epilepsy and his mother was told that he "wasn't going to make it past sixth grade, and that she should start planning for the funeral". The last seizure Cotton experienced was on his final day of sixth grade. He remained on medication for several years, but eventually no longer required treatment.

Focusing on basketball, one of Cotton's biggest deficiencies was his lack of height. He worked with his uncle for an edge to combat taller opponents and modelled his game on NBA star Allen Iverson. He spent much of his youth on outdoor basketball courts playing pick-up games.

== High school career ==
After spending his junior year in Las Vegas, Cotton completed secondary school at Palo Verde High School in Tucson. Cotton helped lead Palo Verde to a 24–7 record and a berth in the state 4A semifinals in the 2009–10 season. He averaged 23.6 points, 7.5 rebounds, 4.0 assists and 3.7 steals per game as a senior, and scored 30 or more points nine times, including a career-high 40 points in an 85–82 win over Buckeye on February 16, 2010. He also set a school record for the highest triple-double with 37 points, 11 rebounds and 11 assists against Rio Rico on December 11, 2009. He earned First Team All-City and First Team All-State honors in 2010. He also had perfect grades and a high GPA.

Cotton was not highly recruited out of high school. He was turned down by Montana State and Northern Arizona, and was later also turned away by Division II school Chico State. He also reportedly tried to obtain a scholarship from Houston Baptist.

== College career ==
=== Freshman season ===
Cotton's family could not afford to pay for college tuition and his scholarship dream looked over until Providence College made an offer just three days before freshman orientation. After reportedly signing with Miami Dade College on August 18, 2010, Cotton instead committed to the Providence Friars on August 30. He scored 15 points in the Friars' season opener against Dartmouth on November 13, 2010. He was a bench player in his freshman season and was unable to break through in a rotation that featured MarShon Brooks, Vincent Council, Gerard Coleman and Duke Mondy. In 31 games in 2010–11, Cotton averaged 4.0 points and 1.5 rebounds in 15.3 minutes per game.

=== Sophomore season ===
As a sophomore in 2011–12, Cotton became a starter and was the team's second leading scorer, averaging 14.3 points per game while shooting 37.9 percent from 3-point range. On December 10, 2011, Cotton scored 20 of his career-high 34 points in the first half of the Friars' 72–61 win over Bryant. He went 11-of-16 from the field with a perfect 10-of-10 from the free throw line against Bryant. He later scored 27 points on 5-of-6 shooting from the field, with a perfect 5-of-5 from 3-point range and 10-of-12 from the free throw line against Louisville on January 10, 2012.

=== Junior season ===
Despite reports of Cotton leaving Providence following his sophomore season, he continued on with the Friars in 2012–13.

Following a breakout sophomore year, Cotton came into his junior season still in the shadows of senior point guard Vincent Council. Cotton was forced to step into the forefront for Providence to make up for injuries in the backcourt to Council and highly touted freshman guard Kris Dunn. Cotton also had to take on a leadership role with a young team. He registered his first career double-double with 24 points and 11 rebounds against Bryant on November 12, 2012. On December 1, he injured his knee and missed the second half against Mississippi State. It turned out he had torn his meniscus, but decided to play through the pain for the rest of the season. He scored a season-high 33 points and was 7-of-14 from 3-point territory against Boston College on December 22. He led the Big East Conference in scoring with 18.3 points per game, becoming the fifth Friar all-time to lead the league in scoring. He subsequently earned first-team All-Big East honors. In total, Cotton averaged 19.7 points, 3.6 rebounds and 2.9 assists in 37.8 minutes per game over 32 games.

During the off-season, Cotton had surgery to repair his meniscus.

=== Senior season ===
To conclude the 2013–14 regular season, Cotton was the only player in the nation to average more than 40 minutes per game (40.1), having averaged 41.9 minutes in Big East competition. His high minutes per game were as a result of Providence's six overtime games, four of which went to a second overtime. In those four double-overtime outings, Cotton played 200 minutes of a possible 200 minutes. His tireless play carried the Friars to their best season in a decade, as they headed into the Big East tournament with a 20–11 record. After going 3–0 in the Big East tournament, the Friars reached the NCAA Tournament for the first time since 2004. It marked Providence's first Big East tournament title since 1994, and Cotton was selected as the tournament MVP. In Providence's 79–77 loss to North Carolina in the NCAA tournament, Cotton scored a career-high 36 points.

In 35 games as a senior, Cotton averaged 21.8 points, 3.5 rebounds, 5.9 assists and 1.0 steals per game. He led the Big East in assists and was second in scoring. He subsequently earned first-team All-Big East honors for the second straight season, as well as being named to the AP Honorable Mention All-America Team. He finished his career ranked fourth all-time in scoring at Providence (1,975 points), and became the fifth player from a major conference to average 20-plus points and five-or-more assists in a season since 2002.

Cotton graduated from Providence with a 3.1 GPA in sociology.

== Professional career ==
=== NBA, D-League, China, and Turkey (2014–2016) ===
After going undrafted in the 2014 NBA draft, Cotton signed with the San Antonio Spurs on July 7, 2014. He played in six Summer League games and five preseason games for San Antonio, before being waived on October 23, 2014. He subsequently joined San Antonio's NBA Development League affiliate team, the Austin Spurs. He appeared in 34 games (all starts) for Austin in the 2014–15 season, averaging 22.4 points (third in the D-League), 4.7 rebounds, 4.6 assists and 1.3 steals in 40.5 minutes (first in the D-League) per contest. He scored in double figures on 31 occasions and recorded 20-plus points in 20 games. He also registered 40-or-more points twice, including a season-high 43 points, eight rebounds, nine assists and two steals against the Reno Bighorns on February 19, 2015. He was named D-League Performer of the Week on February 23 after averaging 30.0 points, 5.7 rebounds, 5.3 assists and 1.3 steals for the week. For the season, he was named to the Western Conference All-Star team for the NBA D-League All-Star Game and earned All-NBA D-League Second Team and NBA D-League All-Rookie First Team honors.

On February 24, 2015, Cotton signed a 10-day contract with the Utah Jazz. He made his NBA debut three days later, recording three points, two rebounds, one assist and one steal in just under seven minutes off the bench in a 104–82 win over the Denver Nuggets. He signed a second 10-day contract with the Jazz on March 6, and a multi-year deal on March 16. Over the final four games of the season, he averaged 14.3 points per game, scoring in double figures all four times, including a season-high 21 points against the Dallas Mavericks on April 13. In 15 games for the Jazz to finish the 2014–15 season, he averaged 5.3 points, 1.2 rebounds and 1.0 assists in 10.6 minutes per game. After playing for the Jazz during the 2015 NBA Summer League and making two appearances during the preseason, Cotton was waived by Utah on October 20, 2015.

Cotton re-joined the Austin Spurs for the 2015–16 NBA Development League season. After averaging 22.0 points in four D-League games, he signed with the Phoenix Suns on November 25, 2015. He made his debut for the Suns on December 30 following injuries to Eric Bledsoe and Ronnie Price, scoring two points on 1-of-6 shooting in a 112–79 loss to the San Antonio Spurs. He also had three steals and two assists in just over 21 minutes off the bench. Cotton appeared in the Suns' next two games before being waived on January 7, 2016. He subsequently returned to the Austin Spurs, where he played two more D-League games.

In late January 2016, Cotton signed with the Xinjiang Flying Tigers of the Chinese Basketball Association (CBA). In nine games to finish the 2015–16 CBA season, including the 2016 CBA Playoffs, he averaged 21.2 points, 3.2 rebounds and 2.7 assists per game.

On April 1, 2016, Cotton signed a 10-day contract with the Memphis Grizzlies. On April 11, he signed with the Grizzlies for the remainder of the 2015–16 regular season. He appeared in five games for the Grizzlies before parting ways with the team prior to the start of the playoffs.

After playing for the Atlanta Hawks during the 2016 NBA Summer League, Cotton signed with Turkish club Anadolu Efes on August 27, 2016. A mutual termination of his contract took place on December 12, 2016, with Cotton citing that the country's safety concerns were a major factor in him leaving. He averaged 8.0 points in 10 EuroLeague games and 10.4 points in seven Turkish League games.

=== Perth Wildcats (2017–2025) ===
==== 2016–17 season: Championship and grand final MVP ====
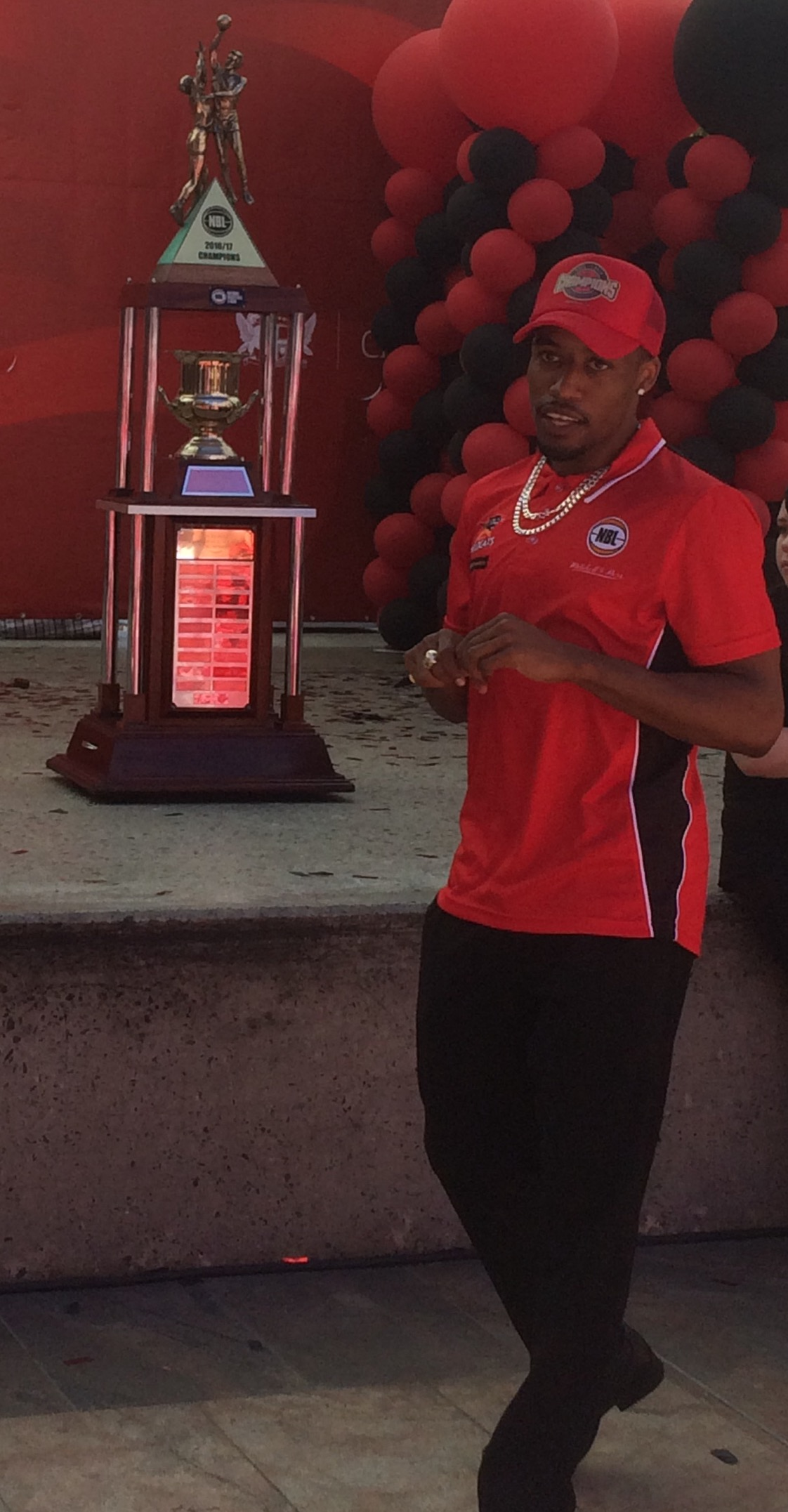
Cotton in March 2017, standing in front of the Wildcats' championship trophy

By late December 2016, reports surfaced that Cotton was moving to Australia. On January 3, 2017, Cotton signed with the Perth Wildcats of the National Basketball League (NBL) for the rest of the 2016–17 NBL season. In his debut on January 7, Cotton scored 26 points in an 80–74 win over the Sydney Kings, setting a Wildcats debut scoring record. In his fifth game for the Wildcats on January 20, Cotton scored a season-high 27 points in an 84–78 overtime win over the Cairns Taipans. In late January, Cotton committed to remaining with the Wildcats for the rest of the season after rejecting a 10-day contract from the Atlanta Hawks. On February 3, he scored a game-high 25 points on 8-of-11 shooting, including five 3-pointers, in a 94–63 win over the Brisbane Bullets. In the Wildcats' regular-season finale on February 12, Cotton scored 19 points in a 96–94 win over Melbourne United. The win propelled the Wildcats into the finals as they finished the regular season in third place with a 15–13 record. His 22.1 points per game during 11 regular season games saw him win the NBL's scoring title as the league's leading scorer.

In game one of the Wildcats' best-of-three semi-final series against the second-seeded Taipans in Cairns on February 17, Cotton had a 34-point effort to lead his team to a 91–69 win. His 34 points were the most scored by a Wildcat in a post-season game since Shawn Redhage had 35 in 2008. He also had a team-high five assists and three steals. Cotton scored nine points in game two in Perth three days later, as the Wildcats defeated the Taipans 74–66 to sweep the series and move on to the NBL Grand Final. The Wildcats went on to sweep the best-of-five grand final series, defeating the Illawarra Hawks 3–0 behind a grand final MVP performance from Cotton. Over the three games, Cotton averaged 27.7 points, which included a 45-point effort in a 95–86 title-clinching win in game three. He shot 12-of-17 from the field, 7-of-12 from 3-point range, and 14-of-15 from the free throw line in game three, with his 45 points setting the new all-time NBL Grand Final scoring record. In 16 games for the Wildcats, he averaged 23.1 points, 3.2 rebounds, 3.1 assists and 1.3 steals per game.

==== 2017–18 season: NBL MVP ====
After attempting to re-enter the NBA via minicamps and the Summer League, Cotton made the decision to return to Perth, re-signing with the Wildcats for 2017–18 NBL season on July 14, 2017. Cotton was considered a long-shot to re-join the Wildcats and reportedly turned down an offer from Spanish club Unicaja Málaga.

In the Wildcats' season opener on October 7, Cotton scored a game-high 24 points in a 96–86 win over the Brisbane Bullets. On December 10, he scored a season-high 36 points in a 99–91 win over the Illawarra Hawks. In the Wildcats' regular-season finale on February 18, Cotton scored a game-high 24 points with six 3-pointers and six assists in an 89–61 win over the Cairns Taipans. The Wildcats finished the regular season in third place with a 16–12 record, while Cotton finished as the NBL's leader in 3-pointers made with 84. The mark came from 187 attempts, giving him a 3-point shooting percentage of 44.9 – the best in the league for any player taking an average of at least one attempt per game. His 84 3-pointers was also third-most in Wildcats history for a regular season, behind Jermaine Beal (87, 2014) and James Harvey (85, 2006). Cotton also led the league in total points scored with 544, averaging 19.4 points per game. He was subsequently named the NBL Most Valuable Player for the 2017–18 season. He became just the third Wildcat to win the award, joining Paul Rogers (2000) and Kevin Lisch (2012). He was also named to the All-NBL First Team.

In game one of their semi-final series against the second-seeded Adelaide 36ers, the Wildcats were defeated 109–74 despite Cotton's 22-point effort. The Wildcats went on to lose game two 89–88, with Cotton scoring 19 of his game-high 31 points in the first quarter, to bow out of the finals at the hands of a 2–0 sweep. His 19 first-quarter points set a record for any Wildcat in one quarter during a final. Cotton appeared in all 30 games for the Wildcats in 2017–18, averaging 19.8 points, 3.2 rebounds, 3.1 assists and 1.2 steals per game. He was named the Wildcats' Club MVP for the 2017–18 season.

On April 3, 2018, Cotton signed with Brescia Leonessa of the Italian Lega Basket Serie A (LBA). He appeared in four regular-season games and seven playoff games to finish the 2017–18 LBA season, averaging 12.3 points, 2.2 rebounds and 1.9 assists per game. He had a season-high 23 points in his third game.

==== 2018–19 season: Second championship ====
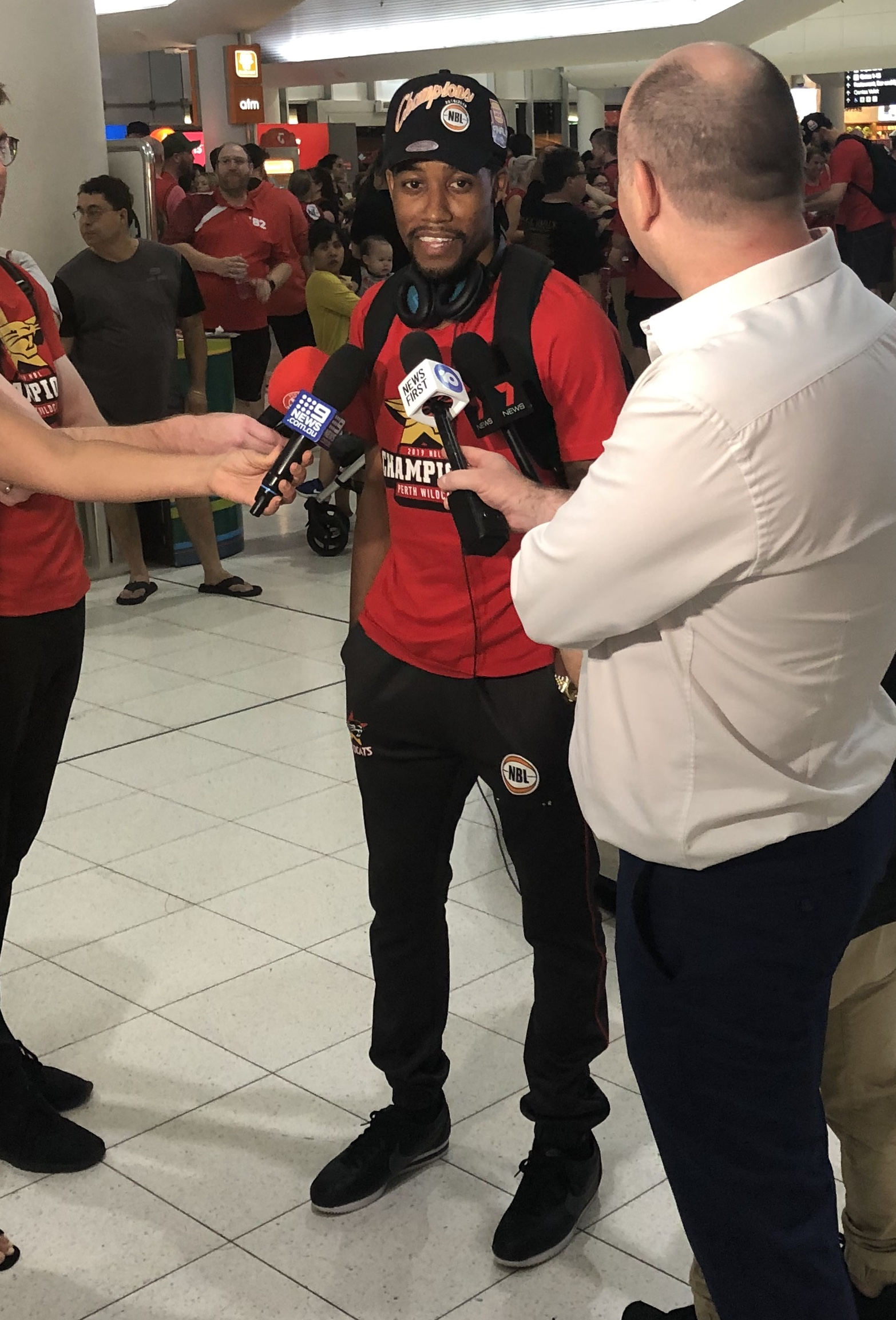
Cotton in March 2019, at Perth Airport after winning the NBL championship

On June 5, 2018, Cotton signed a three-year deal to return to the Wildcats, with the contract including an NBA out-clause. At the NBL Pre-Season Blitz, Cotton won the Ray Borner Medal as tournament's most valuable player. In the Wildcats' season opener on October 11, Cotton scored 22 points in a 99–91 win over the Adelaide 36ers. On October 27, he scored a game-high 31 points in a 101–96 double-overtime win over Melbourne United. On November 9, he scored a season-high 37 points and hit the game-winning 3-pointer with 0.4 seconds left on the clock to lift the Wildcats to a 90–87 win over the Brisbane Bullets. On November 23, he scored a game-high 24 points in a 98–93 overtime win over the New Zealand Breakers. However, he checked out with two minutes remaining in overtime clutching his right thumb after his hand was pinned on the backboard on a fast break layup. He subsequently missed the Wildcats' following game two days later, a game the Wildcats won to move to 10–1 on the season. He missed a second game on December 6 against the Sydney Kings, before returning to action on December 9, scoring a game-high 21 points in a 94–72 win over the Cairns Taipans. Cotton later missed the Wildcats' New Year's Eve game against the Taipans in Cairns due to hamstring tightness. The Wildcats fell to 12–9 by early January, leading to increasing external pressure for roster changes. Instead, the playing group was backed by the club to return to form and enjoy success in the latter part of the season. On February 10, after going scoreless in the first half, Cotton had 24 of his 27 points in the fourth quarter and overtime of the Wildcats' 95–86 win over Kings. On February 15, he scored 24 of his 29 points in the second half of the Wildcats' 93–85 win over the 36ers, helping the Wildcats secure the minor premiership with a sixth straight win. A loss to Melbourne in overtime in the regular-season finale two days later saw the Wildcats finish with an 18–10 record. Overlooked for NBL MVP, Cotton was named All-NBL First Team and Fans MVP, and was crowned the league's scoring champion for the second time in three years.

In game one of the Wildcats' semi-final series against the Bullets, Cotton scored a game-high 22 points in an 89–59 win. In game two, he had 19 points and a career-high 10 assists in an 84–79 win, as they swept the series and moved onto the NBL Grand Final. In game one of the grand final series against Melbourne United, despite going 4-of-16 from the field and 0-of-9 from three, Cotton had eight assists and seven rebounds to go with his 10 points in an 81–71 win. The Wildcats went on to lose game two 92–74 despite Cotton's 19 points and five 3-pointers. In game three, Cotton recorded 16 points and nine assists to help the Wildcats take a 2–1 lead in the series with a 96–67 win. In game four in Melbourne, Cotton scored a game-high 28 points in a 97–84 win, as Cotton claimed his second NBL championship in three years. In 31 games, he averaged 21.8 points, 4.0 rebounds, 3.7 assists and 1.3 steals per game. At the Wildcats MVP Ball, Cotton was crowned the Gordon Ellis Medalist as the club's Most Valuable Player for the 2018–19 season, becoming the ninth Wildcat to win back-to-back club MVP honors.

==== 2019–20 season: NBL MVP, grand final MVP and championship ====
Cotton returned to the Wildcats for the 2019–20 season having had a quiet off-season rehabbing a nagging thumb injury that he withstood throughout the 2018–19 season. In the Wildcats' season opener on October 5, Cotton scored 21 points in a 94–93 win over Melbourne United. On October 20, he scored 27 points and made the game-winning two-pointer to lift the Wildcats to a 95–93 win over United. On November 10, he scored a then season-high 36 points with six 3-pointers in a 104–85 loss to the Sydney Kings. On November 17, he scored 34 points with six 3-pointers in an 88–77 win over the New Zealand Breakers. The Wildcats fell to an 8–5 record after losses to Cairns and Adelaide. Cotton responded with 100 points over the next four games to help the Wildcats win four straight. By the end of that four-game stretch, Cotton had reached 2,000 career points, becoming the 15th Wildcat to do so and the fastest Wildcat to reach the milestone. He did so in 94 games and 3,165 minutes, beating former teammate Shawn Redhage's previous record of 95 games and 3,400 minutes. On December 28, he scored 18 of his season-high 39 points in the fourth quarter and had a then career-high eight 3-pointers in a 98–85 win over the Kings. On February 1, he recorded 30 points and five steals in a 110–100 win over the Kings. He sat out the final regular season game, as the Wildcats earned the second seed for the finals with a 19–9 record. He finished the regular season as the NBL's scoring leader, averaging 22.6 points per game. Along with his 1.7 steals per game, he became the first player in NBL history to lead the league in both scoring and steals. At the NBL's end-of-season awards night, Cotton was named in the All-NBL First Team for the third straight year and claimed the NBL Most Valuable Player Award for the second time in three years. In doing so, he became the seventh player in NBL history to win the league's MVP award more than once.

In game one of their semi-final series against the Cairns Taipans, Cotton scored 42 points with a career-high 10 3-pointers in a 108–107 overtime win. He became the first player to make 10 3-pointers in an NBL semi-final. The Wildcats went on to lose game two with Cotton scoring 11 points, before going on to win game three despite Cotton only scoring five points. In game one of the NBL Grand Final series against the Kings in Sydney, Cotton scored 32 points in an 88–86 win. After scoring a game-high 27 points in a game two loss at home, Cotton had 31 points, seven rebounds and seven assists in a 111–96 win in Sydney in game three. Due to the COVID-19 pandemic, the Kings refused to complete the five-game series. As a result, the NBL announced the Wildcats as the 2020 champions with Cotton named the grand final MVP. He became the first player in Wildcats history to be named league MVP, grand final MVP and win a championship all in the same season. In 33 games, he averaged 22.9 points, 4.1 rebounds, 4.0 assists and 1.5 steals per game.

For the season, Cotton was crowned the Gordon Ellis Medalist as the club's Most Valuable Player for the third straight year, joining Kevin Lisch, Shawn Redhage and Ricky Grace as three-time winners of the club MVP award.

==== 2020–21 season: Third NBL MVP ====
On April 30, 2020, Cotton opted out of the final year of his contract due to the salary cuts that were implemented by the NBL to protect the league during the COVID-19 pandemic. After exploring playing opportunities overseas, Cotton re-signed with the Wildcats on a three-year deal reportedly worth $2 million on May 26, 2020. The 2020–21 NBL season began in January 2021. In the Wildcats' season opener on January 24, Cotton recorded 27 points, seven assists and five steals in an 88–76 win over the South East Melbourne Phoenix. He recorded 32 points and six assists five days later in a 90–89 loss to the Phoenix. On February 23, he recorded 30 points and nine assists in a 113–106 win over the Sydney Kings. On March 14, he recorded a season-high 34 points, seven assists and three steals in a 97–88 win over the Adelaide 36ers. He scored 20 second-half points in leading a 26-point comeback. With seven wins in eight NBL Cup games, the Wildcats were crowned winners of the inaugural NBL Cup. On March 22, he set a new season high with 36 points in a 92–82 win over the 36ers. On April 13, he scored 34 points in an 85–79 overtime win over the New Zealand Breakers. He hit the game-tying buzzer-beating 3-pointer at the end of regulation to send the game into overtime. On May 9, he recorded 32 points, 10 assists and six rebounds in a 98–84 win over the Breakers, becoming the first Wildcat since Shawn Redhage in 2006 to have 30 points and 10 assists in a game. On May 24, he was ruled out for the rest of the season after suffering a hematoma to his left quadriceps. He averaged career highs in points (23.5) and assists (5.7), earning his fourth NBL scoring title. He was subsequently named NBL MVP for the third time, becoming the first player to win back-to-back MVPs since Andrew Gaze in 1998 and joined Gaze and Leroy Loggins as the only three-time winners. He was also voted Fans MVP and named to the All-NBL First Team for the fourth consecutive season. Without Cotton, the Wildcats reached the grand final series but lost in a 3–0 sweep to Melbourne United.

==== 2021–22 season: Fifth scoring title and All-NBL First Team ====
Cotton entered the 2021–22 season fully recovered from the hematoma and surgery. In the second game of the season on December 5, he scored 31 points in a 90–67 win over the Cairns Taipans. On December 31, he scored 19 of his 29 points in the second quarter of the Wildcats' 84–78 win over the Taipans. On January 22, 2022, against the Illawarra Hawks, Cotton played his 150th game for the Wildcats. Five days later, also against the Hawks, he helped the Wildcats move to a 7–2 record with a 94–80 win. He scored 20 of his game-high 28 points in the first half. On February 12, he scored 31 points in a 93–87 loss to Melbourne United. On February 19, he scored a game-high 33 points with eight 3-pointers in a 98–95 loss to the Sydney Kings. On March 14, he recorded 32 points, nine rebounds and eight assists in a 104–102 overtime win over the New Zealand Breakers. He made a 3-pointer and was fouled with 1.4 seconds to play, missing the free throw and seeing Perth to the win. In the season finale on April 24, Cotton scored a game-high 28 points in a 102–100 overtime loss to the South East Melbourne Phoenix. The Wildcats finished in fifth place with a 16–12 record. They subsequently missed the finals which ended the club's 35-year finals appearance streak.

For the fourth straight season and the fifth time in six years, Cotton was named NBL scoring champion with 22.7 points per game. He played all 28 games and totalled 635 points, the most points scored by Cotton in a 28-game regular season. He also hit 88 3-pointers, the most ever by a Wildcat in a regular season. He was subsequently named to the All-NBL First Team for the fifth straight year and was named Wildcats Club MVP for the fourth time.

==== 2022–23 season: Sixth scoring title and All-NBL First Team ====
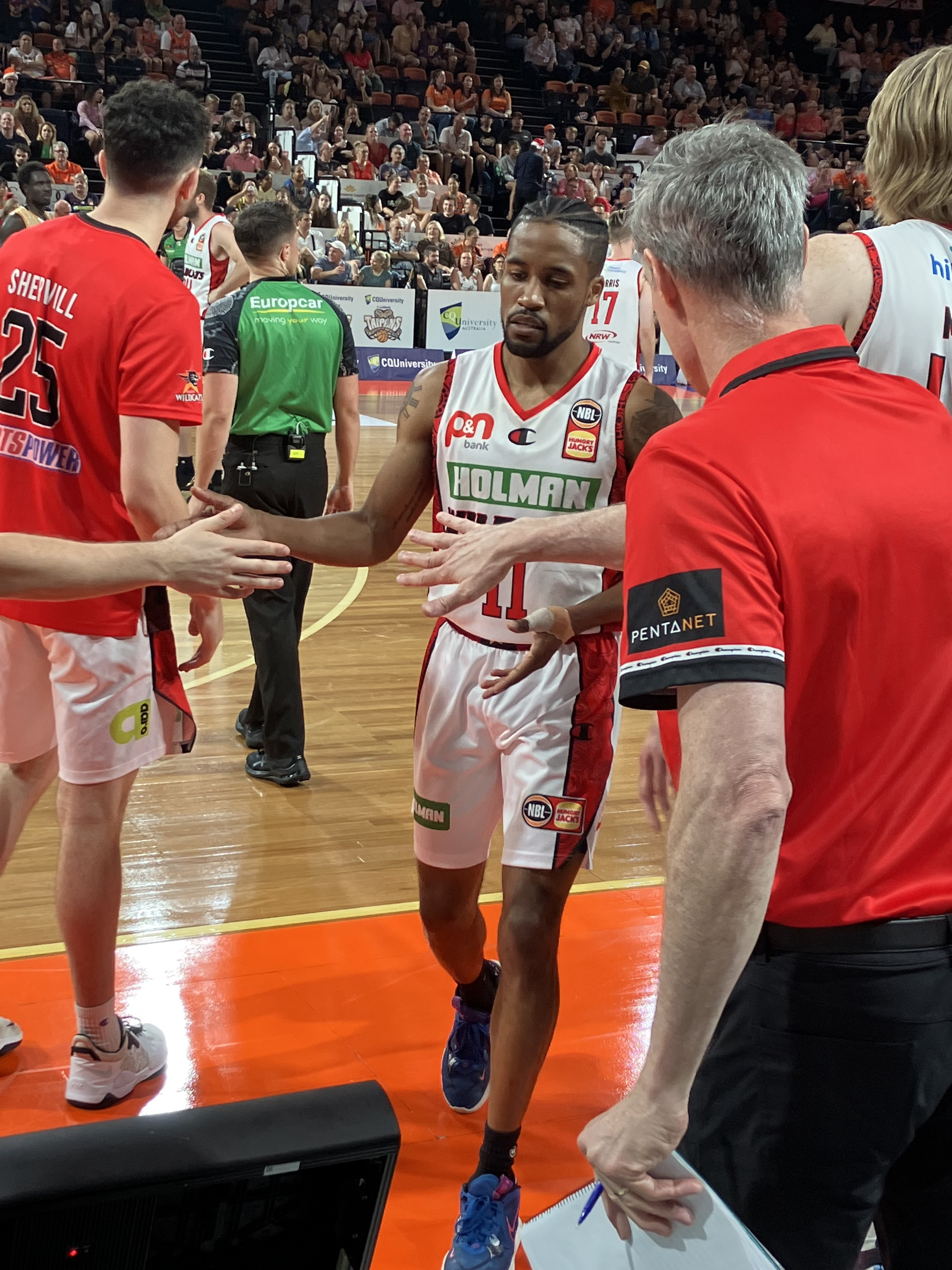
Cotton with the Wildcats in Cairns against the Taipans in December 2022

On May 4, 2022, Cotton re-signed with the Wildcats on a new three-year deal. In the 2022–23 season opener on October 2, he recorded 23 points, 12 rebounds, six assists and six steals in an 87–73 win over the Brisbane Bullets. With two 3-pointers against the Bullets, he reached 500 career 3-pointers. On January 20, 2023, he had 21 points and a career-high 11 assists in a 111–104 win over the Sydney Kings. On January 27, he scored 40 points with seven 3-pointers in a 106–86 win over the Illawarra Hawks. It was his first NBL regular-season game with 40 points and the third 40-point game of his NBL career. On February 3, he scored a game-high 28 points to go with 13 rebounds and seven assists in an 84–71 loss to the Cairns Taipans. Two days later, despite Cotton's 1-of-19 from the field, the Wildcats defeated the Kings 96–84 in the final regular season game to qualify for the post-season. For the fifth straight season and the sixth time in seven years, Cotton was named NBL scoring champion with 23.5 points per game. He was also named to the All-NBL First Team for the sixth straight year. In the play-in qualifier, Cotton scored 20 of his game-high 26 points in the fourth quarter of the Wildcats' 106–99 win over the South East Melbourne Phoenix. In the play-in game three days later, the Wildcats bowed out of the finals with a 91–78 loss to the Taipans, with Cotton recording 19 points and 10 assists. He was named Wildcats Club MVP for the fifth time.

==== 2023–24 season: Fourth NBL MVP ====
After scoring 21 points in a season-opening win over the Tasmania JackJumpers, a form slump from Cotton saw the Wildcats win just two of their first six games. He averaged 15.2 points on 32 per cent from the field over the first four rounds, where he had two matches scoring 11 points and one where he was restricted to seven points. The Wildcats fell to 2–5 after a loss to the Brisbane Bullets, where Cotton scored 10 points at 16 per cent from the field. On November 4, he scored 29 points in a 99–88 win over the Adelaide 36ers, helping the Wildcats snap a four-game losing streak. Two days later, he scored 24 points in a 102–95 overtime win over Melbourne United. On November 10, he scored 37 points in a 94–76 win over the New Zealand Breakers. On December 1, he scored a season-high 41 points in a 114–105 win over the Sydney Kings, marking a sixth straight victory. The Wildcats' six-game win streak was ended on December 8 with a loss to the Illawarra Hawks, where Cotton scored seven points. On December 23, he scored 36 points with six 3-pointers in a 109–103 overtime loss to Melbourne. The Wildcats went on to win six straight games, with Cotton reaching 5000 NBL career points on January 21 against the Kings. He became the third player in the NBL's 40-minute era to score 5000 points, joining Chris Goulding and Daniel Johnson. Cotton averaged 26.6 points on 43 per cent shooting during a 13–2 run between rounds six and sixteen that set up the Wildcats for a top-two finish on the ladder. He missed the regular-season finale with a knee injury as the Wildcats finished in second place with a 17–11 record. He led the league in minutes played with a career-high 37:31 per game. For the sixth straight season and the seventh time in eight years, Cotton was named NBL scoring champion with a league-high 23.1 points per game. He was named NBL MVP for the fourth time, becoming the second player after Andrew Gaze to win four MVPs. He was also voted Fans MVP and named to the All-NBL First Team for the seventh consecutive season. He was subsequently touted as Australian sport's most dominant athlete of the last decade. He went on to set a record-equalling sixth Wildcats Club MVP, joining Ricky Grace and Shawn Redhage as six-time winners.

In the semi-finals series against the JackJumpers, the Wildcats won game one 89–81 with Cotton scoring 15 points before going on to lose game two 102–94 despite Cotton's game-high 26 points. In game three, the Wildcats bowed out of the finals with a 100–84 loss at home, with Cotton scoring a team-high 21 points. He was limited to nine shots and seven free throws in game three, with Tasmania consistently denying him the ball.

Cotton led the league for average time on court for the sixth year in a row. His 38 minutes per game in 2023–24 was five minutes longer than any other player. Teams attempted to wear him down all season by sending multiple opponents to defend him, which resulted in him being the most fouled player in the NBL.

==== 2024–25 season: Fifth NBL MVP ====
Cotton entered the 2024–25 NBL season in the best physical shape of his career after spending the winter bulking up in America. In the season opener on September 20, he scored 26 points with eight 3-pointers in a 106–98 win over the South East Melbourne Phoenix. The Wildcats went on to lose their next three games with Cotton averaging a career-low 18.8 points per game. On October 10, he scored a game-high 35 points with seven 3-pointers in a 90–87 win over the Cairns Taipans. On October 19, Cotton took a knock to his ribs in the opening 40 seconds against the New Zealand Breakers in Auckland. He remained in the game for another two minutes before leaving the court in pain and was later rushed to hospital with an expected fractured rib. He was cleared to fly home from Auckland with the team the next day and was later ruled out for roughly a month. He missed five games and returned to action on November 15, scoring a game-high 33 points in a 97–84 win over the Phoenix.

On December 1, Cotton scored 59 points in a 123–112 win over the Breakers, finishing with 18-of-28 from the field, 7-of-15 from 3-point range and 16-of-17 from the free throw line. He had 20 points in the opening quarter, 11 in the second, 17 in the third and 11 in the fourth. He set the most points scored by any player since the league reverted to 40-minute games in 2009–10 and he surpassed James Crawford's all-time Wildcats scoring record of 57 in 1987. It was the most points in any NBL game since Shane Heal's 61 for the Brisbane Bullets in 1994 and he threatened the all-time 40-minute mark of 63 points set by Reg Biddings for the Forestville Eagles in 1981. Cotton's 59 points tied sixth for the most ever in an NBL game and 28 field goal attempts were the fewest by any player to have scored 55 or more in a game. On December 6, he scored 40 points in a 121–111 loss to the Illawarra Hawks, recording successive 40-point games for the first time in his career. Two days later, he scored 49 points in a 115–105 win over the Adelaide 36ers, becoming the first NBL player since Andrew Gaze in 1991 to have three consecutive 40-point games. On December 14, he scored 44 points in a 128–92 win over the Taipans, once again becoming the first since Gaze in 1991 and the third ever after Gaze and Al Green to have four consecutive 40-point games. On December 28, he had 21 points and a career-high 12 assists in a 116–92 win over the 36ers. On January 5, he scored 41 points in a 96–86 win over the Breakers. He helped the team go 6–1 over seven consecutive games on the road between mid December and mid January.

On January 25, Cotton scored 38 points on 12-of-37 shooting in a 125–116 double-overtime loss to the Taipans. On February 7, in the regular-season finale, he scored 49 points with nine 3-pointers in a 112–104 win over the 36ers. It marked his sixth 40-plus point haul of the season, the first player to do so since Gaze in 1993. He finished the regular season with a career-high 28.6 points per game to become an eight-time scoring champion, as the Wildcats finished the regular season in third place with an 18–11 record. He was subsequently named NBL MVP for the fifth time, alongside All-NBL First Team for the eighth consecutive season, as well as Fans MVP. He went on to win his seventh Wildcats Club MVP, setting a club record.

In the NBL Seeding Qualifier, Cotton scored 27 points in a 122–105 win over the Phoenix, helping the Wildcats advance to the semi-finals. In the semi-finals series against United, Cotton scored 22 points in a game one loss, 18 points in a game two win, and 33 points in a season-ending game three loss.

Cotton was offered the largest contract in NBL history by the Wildcats, about $1 million per season, but he wanted to test free agency. On March 25, 2025, the Wildcats announced that Cotton had been unable to commit to the club. In nine seasons for the Wildcats, he played a total of 258 games and averaged 23.1 points per game.

=== Mets de Guaynabo (2025) ===
On March 6, 2025, Cotton signed with Mets de Guaynabo of the Baloncesto Superior Nacional for the 2025 season. On May 18, he scored a season-high 29 points in a 111–99 loss to Criollos de Caguas. His final game for the team came on May 23. In 23 games, he averaged 17.2 points, 3.1 rebounds, 5.1 assists and 1.5 steals in 33 minutes per game.

=== Adelaide 36ers (2025–present) ===
==== 2025–26 season: Sixth NBL MVP ====
Cotton with the 36ers in January 2026

On May 23, 2025, Cotton signed a three-year deal with the Adelaide 36ers reportedly worth over $1 million a season. There had been a widespread expectation that Cotton would accept a lucrative deal to move overseas but the 36ers were constantly in contact with his agent and soon learnt that he was interested in returning to the NBL. He was lured to Adelaide to play for head coach Mike Wells, who was an assistant at the Utah Jazz when Cotton played for the franchise in 2015. Prior to the start of the season, Cotton was named co-captain of the 36ers alongside Isaac Humphries and Dejan Vasiljevic.

In his debut for the 36ers on September 28, 2025, Cotton scored 39 points with six 3-pointers and six assists in an 87–80 win over the Brisbane Bullets, marking the highest-scoring debut in team history. On October 18, he scored 53 points in a 91–86 win over the Cairns Taipans, breaking the previous franchise record of 48 points scored by Darryl Pearce in 1988. On November 9, in his first game against the Perth Wildcats, Cotton scored a game-high 23 points with seven 3-pointers in a 94–87 loss in Adelaide. On November 16, he scored 41 points in a 105–101 overtime win over the Taipans. Three days later, he recorded 31 points and a career-high 13 assists in a 97–85 win over the Illawarra Hawks. On December 7, in his first appearance in Perth as a 36er, Cotton recorded 21 points and 12 assists in a 95–94 win. On December 12, he had 33 points, 13 assists, seven rebounds and four steals in a 114–105 overtime win over Melbourne United. On December 28, he scored 36 points in a 95–84 win over the Wildcats. On January 23, 2026, he scored a game-high 33 points, including the game-winning 3-pointer, in a 112–110 overtime win over the New Zealand Breakers. On February 14, he scored 42 points in a 92–89 win over the Breakers, playing every second of the game and finishing with seven 3-pointers. He missed the 36ers' final regular season game on February 20 against the Wildcats with back soreness, but returned two days later for the NBL Ignite Cup Final. In the Ignite Cup Final, Cotton had game highs with 34 points and nine assists in a 111–107 loss to the Breakers.

For the season, Cotton helped the 36ers finish second on the ladder with a 23–10 record. In 32 regular season games, he averaged a league-leading 25.7 points (ninth scoring title), 7.6 assists (league-leader and career-high), 3.6 rebounds and 1.8 steals (career-high). He was subsequently named NBL Most Valuable Player for the sixth time, coming within one of Andrew Gaze's all-time best seven league MVPs. He also joined Gaze as the only men to have been named MVP for three consecutive seasons. He was also named All-NBL First Team for the ninth consecutive season, as well as Fans MVP for the third consecutive season and fifth overall. He claimed the Mark Davis Perpetual Trophy as the 36ers' Club MVP.

In game one of the semi-final playoff series against the South East Melbourne Phoenix, Cotton scored 42 points with six 3-pointers in a 104–97 win. In game two, he scored a team-high 29 points in a 101–92 loss. In game three, he had 38 points, six rebounds and seven assists in a 108–96 victory to win the series 2–1 over the Phoenix, helping advance the 36ers through to the NBL Championship Series. He became the first player since Andrew Gaze in 1993 to record 38 points, six rebounds and seven assists in a Finals game. In game one of the Championship Series against the Sydney Kings, Cotton was held to 10 points as the 36ers lost 112–68. In game two of the series against the Kings, Cotton scored a game-high 28 points and made the game-winning buzzer-beating layup to lift the 36ers to a 91–89 win. In game three, he recorded 15 points and 12 assists in a 106–93 loss. In game four, he recorded 19 points and 12 assists in a 92–91 win. In game five, he scored an equal game-high 35 points to go with nine assists in a 113–101 overtime loss, with the 36ers losing the series 3–2 to finish as runners-up.

==== 2026–27 season ====
Following the unexpected off-season departure of Mike Wells, Cotton was reunited with his former Perth Wildcats coach, Trevor Gleeson, who was appointed the 36ers' new head coach in May 2026. The pair previously won three championships together. He was appointed as captain for the season. In the season opener on September 19, he recorded 29 points and seven assists in a 97–95 win over Melbourne United. On September 24, in his 300th NBL game, he recorded 37 points, nine assists and four steals in a 98–97 loss to the Perth Wildcats. The 36ers started the season with a 2–4 record. On October 16, he scored 35 points in a 94–88 win over the Tasmania JackJumpers. On October 24, he recorded 37 points and eight assists in a 108–94 loss to the South East Melbourne Phoenix.

== National team ==
After becoming an Australian citizen in 2025, Cotton entertained the possibility of representing the Australian 3x3 team at the 2026 Commonwealth Games in Glasgow, Scotland.

On May 14, 2026, it was announced that Cotton would debut for the Australia men's national basketball team, the Boomers, during the FIBA World Cup qualifiers in Perth in July 2026. He was officially named in his first Boomers squad on June 1. In his Boomers debut on July 3, he recorded 18 points and five assists in a 124–52 win over Guam. Three days later, he scored a game-high 21 points in a 92–49 win over Philippines.

== Career statistics ==
Legend
GP	Games played	GS	Games started	MPG	Minutes per game
FG%	Field goal percentage	3P%	3-point field goal percentage	FT%	Free throw percentage
RPG	Rebounds per game	APG	Assists per game	SPG	Steals per game
BPG	Blocks per game	PPG	Points per game	**Bold**	Career high
†	Won an NBA championship	*	Led the league

=== NBA ===
Regular season

Year	Team	GP	GS	MPG	FG%	3P%	FT%	RPG	APG	SPG	BPG	PPG
2014–15	Utah	**15**	0	10.6	.420	**.350**	**.833**	**1.2**	**1.0**	.3	.0	**5.3**
2015–16	Phoenix	3	0	**11.0**	.250	.000	.000	.0	**1.0**	**1.0**	.0	1.3
2015–16	Memphis	5	0	1.2	**1.000**	.000	.000	.0	.0	.0	.0	.8
**Career**		23	0	8.6	.418	.304	.833	.8	.8	.3	.0	3.8

=== NBL ===
Regular season and playoffs

Year	Team	GP	GS	MPG	FG%	3P%	FT%	RPG	APG	SPG	BPG	PPG
2016–17	Perth	16	16	33.2	**.474**	.352	.889	3.2	3.1	1.3	.0	23.1
2017–18	Perth	30	30	32.7	.441	**.448**	.869	3.0	3.1	1.3	.0	19.8
2018–19	Perth	31	31	35.2	.404	.352	.860	4.0	3.8	1.4	.1	21.8
2019–20	Perth	**33**	**33**	34.6	.427	.387	.848	4.1	4.1	1.5	.0	22.9
2020–21	Perth	32	32	35.5	.407	.319	.900	2.8	5.7	1.4	.1	23.5
2021–22	Perth	28	28	35.2	.412	.359	**.913**	3.8	4.9	1.4	.0	22.7
2022–23	Perth	30	30	36.4	.404	.362	**.913**	**4.6**	4.9	1.6	.0	23.4
2023–24	Perth	30	30	37.7	.404	.349	.890	3.9	4.1	1.5	.1	22.9
2024–25	Perth	28	28	34.9	.456	.431	.870	3.4	4.7	1.1	**.3**	**28.1**
2025–26	Adelaide	**33**	**33**	**38.0**	.447	.387	.897	3.5	**7.5**	**1.8**	.2	26.2

=== College ===
Year	Team	GP	GS	MPG	FG%	3P%	FT%	RPG	APG	SPG	BPG	PPG
2010–11	Providence	31	1	15.3	.387	.259	.784	1.5	.5	.7	.0	4.0
2011–12	Providence	32	32	38.6	.413	**.379**	**.891**	2.5	2.3	**1.0**	**.2**	14.3
2012–13	Providence	32	31	37.8	**.437**	.364	.798	**3.6**	2.9	.9	.1	19.7
2013–14	Providence	**35**	**35**	**39.9**	.419	.367	.853	3.5	**5.9**	**1.0**	.1	**21.8**
**Career**		130	99	33.2	.421	.361	.838	2.8	3.0	.9	.1	15.2

== Personal life ==
Cotton is the son of Yvonne and Charles Cotton. He has three brothers: Justin Tarpley, Chaz Cotton and Elijah Cotton. College life allowed Cotton to reconnect with his father in New York and meet Chaz and Elijah. Chaz played college lacrosse at Cairn University. One of his brothers died by suicide in 2021. His uncle, David Adams, played football at the University of Arizona and had a short stint with the Dallas Cowboys in the NFL.

Cotton married for the first time in 2014 to fellow Providence graduate, Simone Tubman. He later married for a second time to wife Rachel, who is from Perth. The couple's first child, a daughter, was born in Australia in November 2019.

Prior to 2020, Cotton would typically return to the United States after each NBL season, splitting time in Tucson and Providence, Rhode Island.

Cotton is a close friend of fellow basketball player and former teammate, Devondrick Walker.

Cotton is a supporter of the Collingwood Football Club in the Australian Football League. Cotton and former Collingwood ruckman, Mason Cox, shared the same lawyer in relation to becoming an Australian citizen.

=== Australian citizenship journey ===
In July 2019, Cotton applied for an Australian Distinguished Talent visa, as Basketball Australia worked to secure his eligibility for the 2020 Olympics. At the time, Cotton believed that obtaining permanent residency through the Distinguished Talent visa (DTV) would expedite the process for Australian citizenship. However, delays quickly arose due to the COVID-19 pandemic. In 2020, the Federal government informed Cotton that he would need to leave Australia to finalise the DTV process. But due to the country's border closure, he was stuck in limbo for six months. It wasn't until February 2021 that the government invited him to a meeting in Melbourne, while the Perth Wildcats were there for the NBL Cup. After receiving his DTV, Cotton promptly submitted his citizenship application.

"Why would I go through with permanent residency if you told me it would delay the process of getting citizenship?

Going into it, I thought it was part of the process of me getting closer to citizenship. In fact it has delayed it and who knows how long I will be waiting."

— Bryce Cotton, April 2023

Over the following two years, Cotton continued to await approval for his citizenship, despite public outcry and scarce updates on his status. During this period, Basketball Australia withdrew its request to the Australian Olympic Committee (AOC) to urge the Federal government to fast-track Cotton's citizenship application. This decision came after the AOC insisted that Basketball Australia guarantee Cotton's place on the final 2024 Olympic team.

In April 2023, it was revealed that during the meeting to secure his Distinguished Talent visa, Cotton's original visa had to be cancelled, and he was legally detained for about 30 minutes while the new paperwork was processed. This brief period without a valid visa was classified as Cotton being unlawfully in Australia, and as a result of this technicality, the Federal government ruled him ineligible for citizenship. He was also banned from reapplying until 2025. Additional delays arose in 2025 due to Cotton spending over 90 days outside of Australia in the previous 12 months. Had Cotton become an Australian player while with the Perth Wildcats, the club could have signed him as a local marquee player, offering him a salary of any size, with only a small portion counting against the salary cap. As an import, however, every dollar of his salary was included in the cap.

On September 5, 2025, it was announced that Cotton's Australian citizenship application had been approved after hiring a workplace migration law expert to help guide his citizenship process. On September 17, he received his citizenship at a ceremony ahead of the start of the 2025–26 NBL season.
