= 2016–17 NBL season =

Australian basketball season

- League: National Basketball League
- Season: 2016–17
- Dates: 6 October 2016 – 5 March 2017
- Teams: 8
- TV partners: Australia: Fox Sports; SBS; New Zealand: Sky Sport; Online: NBL TV

Regular season
- Season champions: Adelaide 36ers
- Season MVP: (United States) Jerome Randle (Adelaide)

Finals
- Champions: Perth Wildcats (8th title)
- Runners-up: Illawarra Hawks
- Semi-finalists: Adelaide 36ers Cairns Taipans
- Finals MVP: (United States) Bryce Cotton (Perth)

Statistical leaders
Points	(United States) Bryce Cotton (Perth)	22.1
Rebounds	(United States) Josh Boone (Melbourne)	9.3
Assists	(United States) Jerome Randle (Adelaide)	5.3

Records
- Attendance: 725,749 (6,048 per game)

NBL seasons
- ← 2015–16 2017–18 →

The 2016–17 NBL season was the 39th season of the National Basketball League since its establishment in 1979. A total of eight teams contested the league. The regular season was played between October 2016 and February 2017, followed by a post-season featuring the top four in late February and March 2017.

During the off-season Townsville Crocodiles folded with Brisbane Bullets returning.

Australian broadcast rights to the season were held by Fox Sports, in the second year of a five-year deal, with one game per week simulcast on SBS. In New Zealand, Sky Sport are the official league broadcaster.

== Pre-season ==
=== 2016 NBL All-Australian Tour of China ===
6 May	China	57–49	NBL All-Australian Team	Guangxi Sports Center Gymnasium, Nanning, China
Fox Sports

8 May	China	64–72	NBL All-Australian Team	Tianhe Gymnasium, Guangzhou, China
Fox Sports				Attendance: collapsible

10 May	China	65–76	NBL All-Australian Team	Beijing National Indoor Stadium, Beijing, China
Fox Sports				Attendance: 18,000

NBL All-Australian Team won the series 2–1.

=== 2016 Australian Basketball Challenge ===
A pre-season tournament featuring all eight teams and two invited CBA teams was held on 23–26 September 2016 at Brisbane Convention Centre, Brisbane. The winner will receive the fourth annual Loggins–Bruton Cup.

23 September 2016	Perth Wildcats	109–66	Tianjin Ronggang Gold Lions	Brisbane Convention Centre, Brisbane
NBL TV

23 September 2016	Sydney Kings	94–65	New Zealand Breakers	Brisbane Convention Centre, Brisbane
NBL TV

23 September 2016	Brisbane Bullets	117–73	Zhejiang Golden Bulls	Brisbane Convention Centre, Brisbane
NBL TV

24 September 2016	Cairns Taipans	93–83	Adelaide 36ers	Brisbane Convention Centre, Brisbane
NBL TV

24 September 2016	Illawarra Hawks	123–75	Zhejiang Golden Bulls	Brisbane Convention Centre, Brisbane
NBL TV

24 September 2016	Melbourne United	133–62	Tianjin Ronggang Gold Lions	Brisbane Convention Centre, Brisbane
NBL TV

24 September 2016	Brisbane Bullets	83–79	Sydney Kings	Brisbane Convention Centre, Brisbane
NBL TV

25 September 2016	New Zealand Breakers	68–79	Cairns Taipans	Brisbane Convention Centre, Brisbane
NBL TV

25 September 2016	Illawarra Hawks	98–77	Perth Wildcats	Brisbane Convention Centre, Brisbane
NBL TV

25 September 2016	Tianjin Ronggang Gold Lions	93–102	Zhejiang Golden Bulls	Brisbane Convention Centre, Brisbane
NBL TV

25 September 2016	Adelaide 36ers	97–100	Melbourne United	Brisbane Convention Centre, Brisbane
NBL TV

26 September 2016	Perth Wildcats	81–69	Sydney Kings	Brisbane Convention Centre, Brisbane
NBL TV

26 September 2016	Adelaide 36ers	103–89	New Zealand Breakers	Brisbane Convention Centre, Brisbane
NBL TV

26 September 2016	Brisbane Bullets	61–91	Cairns Taipans	Brisbane Convention Centre, Brisbane
NBL TV

26 September 2016	Illawarra Hawks	94–86	Melbourne United	Brisbane Convention Centre, Brisbane
NBL TV

Illawarra Hawks are pre-season champions.

== Regular season ==
=== Round 1 ===
6 October 2016	Brisbane Bullets	72–65	Perth Wildcats	Brisbane Entertainment Centre, Brisbane
18:30	Scoring by quarter: 9–20, 21–20, 29–14, 13–11
Fox Sports		boxscore		Attendance: 6,619

7 October 2016	New Zealand Breakers	76–71	Melbourne United	Vector Arena, Auckland
19:30	Scoring by quarter: 17–16, 23–15, 8–21, 28–19
Sky Sport		boxscore		Attendance: 5,639

7 October 2016	Illawarra Hawks	122–88	Adelaide 36ers	WIN Entertainment Centre, Wollongong
19:30	Scoring by quarter: 31–22, 24–34, 34–10, 33–22
Fox Sports		boxscore		Attendance: 3,247

8 October 2016	Sydney Kings	73–77	Brisbane Bullets	Qudos Bank Arena, Sydney
17:30	Scoring by quarter: 14–17, 20–21, 16–18, 23–21
Fox Sports		boxscore		Attendance: 8,035

8 October 2016	Perth Wildcats	84–74(OT)	Cairns Taipans	Perth Arena, Perth
18:30	Scoring by quarter: 19–8, 12–15, 16–25, 21–20, Overtime: 16–6
Fox Sports		boxscore		Attendance: 12,701

9 October 2016	Melbourne United	79–87	Adelaide 36ers	Hisense Arena, Melbourne
15:00	Scoring by quarter: 20–24, 22–27, 16–22, 21–14
Fox Sports		boxscore		Attendance: 8,519

=== Round 2 ===
13 October 2016	Illawarra Hawks	84–88	Sydney Kings	WIN Entertainment Centre, Wollongong
19:30	Scoring by quarter: 23–22, 27–26, 12–23, 22–17
Fox Sports		boxscore		Attendance: 3,000

14 October 2016	Adelaide 36ers	87–98	Melbourne United	Titanium Security Arena, Adelaide
19:00	Scoring by quarter: 22–23, 17–32, 22–25, 26–18
Fox Sports		boxscore		Attendance: 6,000

14 October 2016	Perth Wildcats	75–73	New Zealand Breakers	Perth Arena, Perth
18:30	Scoring by quarter: 22–25, 25–11, 8–23, 20–14
Fox Sports		boxscore		Attendance: 12,169

15 October 2016	Sydney Kings	92–78	Cairns Taipans	Qudos Bank Arena, Sydney
19:30	Scoring by quarter: 23–24, 19–15, 23–27, 27–12
Fox Sports		boxscore		Attendance: 5,246

16 October 2016	Melbourne United	95–83	Illawarra Hawks	Hisense Arena, Melbourne
15:00	Scoring by quarter: 20–25, 26–20, 29–18, 20–20
Fox Sports		boxscore		Attendance: 7,512

16 October 2016	Brisbane Bullets	93–96(OT)	Adelaide 36ers	Brisbane Convention Centre, Brisbane
18:00	Scoring by quarter: 23–21, 25–17, 16–21, 19–24, Overtime: 10–13
Fox Sports		boxscore		Attendance: 3,500

=== Round 3 ===
20 October 2016	New Zealand Breakers	78–92	Sydney Kings	North Shore Events Centre, Auckland
19:30	Scoring by quarter: 18–23, 24–27, 20–22, 16–20
Sky Sport		boxscore		Attendance: not available

20 October 2016	Melbourne United	78–70	Brisbane Bullets	Hisense Arena, Melbourne
19:30	Scoring by quarter: 12–16, 29–10, 16–20, 21–24
Fox Sports		boxscore		Attendance: 5,080

21 October 2016	Adelaide 36ers	83–67	Cairns Taipans	Titanium Security Arena, Adelaide
19:00	Scoring by quarter: 29–16, 17–16, 18–20, 19–15
Fox Sports		boxscore		Attendance: not available

21 October 2016	Perth Wildcats	80–73	Illawarra Hawks	Perth Arena, Perth
18:30	Scoring by quarter: 17–20, 22–13, 24–21, 17–19
Fox Sports		boxscore		Attendance: 11,534

22 October 2016	Brisbane Bullets	88–82	New Zealand Breakers	Brisbane Convention Centre, Brisbane
18:30	Scoring by quarter: 26–17, 24–20, 14–26, 24–19
Fox Sports		boxscore		Attendance: not available

23 October 2016	Melbourne United	69–72	Perth Wildcats	Hisense Arena, Melbourne
15:00	Scoring by quarter: 15–10, 23–24, 14–22, 17–16
Fox Sports		boxscore		Attendance: 8,655

24 October 2016	Sydney Kings	90–73	Illawarra Hawks	Qudos Bank Arena, Sydney
19:30	Scoring by quarter: 25–23, 28–22, 25–6, 12–22
Fox Sports		boxscore		Attendance: not available

=== Round 4 ===
27 October 2016	Cairns Taipans	83–75	Melbourne United	Cairns Convention Centre, Cairns
18:30	Scoring by quarter: 19–20, 30–16, 16–17, 18–22
Fox Sports		boxscore		Attendance: not available

28 October 2016	Illawarra Hawks	81–76	Perth Wildcats	WIN Entertainment Centre, Wollongong
19:30	Scoring by quarter: 24–24, 23–21, 20–17, 14–14
Fox Sports		boxscore		Attendance: not available

29 October 2016	New Zealand Breakers	119–93	Adelaide 36ers	Vector Arena, Auckland
19:30	Scoring by quarter: 35–19, 27–24, 30–25, 27–25
Sky Sport		boxscore		Attendance: 5,542

30 October 2016	Sydney Kings	87–78	Brisbane Bullets	Qudos Bank Arena, Sydney
15:00	Scoring by quarter: 13–17, 23–12, 23–23, 28–26
Fox Sports		boxscore		Attendance: not available

30 October 2016	Illawarra Hawks	83–98	Cairns Taipans	WIN Entertainment Centre, Wollongong
19:00	Scoring by quarter: 23–27, 18–25, 24–21, 18–25
Fox Sports		boxscore		Attendance: not available

=== Round 5 ===
4 November 2016	Melbourne United	92–98(OT)	New Zealand Breakers	Hisense Arena, Melbourne
19:30	Scoring by quarter: 17–27, 23–14, 30–21, 13–21, Overtime: 9–15
Fox Sports		boxscore		Attendance: not available

5 November 2016	Cairns Taipans	64–57	Sydney Kings	Cairns Convention Centre, Cairns
18:30	Scoring by quarter: 16–10, 16–17, 14–13, 18–17
Fox Sports		boxscore		Attendance: not available

5 November 2016	Perth Wildcats	106–103	Adelaide 36ers	Perth Arena, Perth
18:30	Scoring by quarter: 29–18, 31–26, 23–27, 23–32
Fox Sports		boxscore		Attendance: not available

6 November 2016	New Zealand Breakers	86–70	Brisbane Bullets	Vector Arena, Auckland
15:00	Scoring by quarter: 22–23, 27–17, 16–21, 21–9
Sky Sport		boxscore		Attendance: not available

6 November 2016	Illawarra Hawks	82–73	Melbourne United	WIN Entertainment Centre, Wollongong
15:00	Scoring by quarter: 21–20, 20–10, 12–20, 29–23
Fox Sports		boxscore		Attendance: not available

7 November 2016	Sydney Kings	79–77	Cairns Taipans	Qudos Bank Arena, Sydney
	Scoring by quarter: 16–22, 23–14, 15–19, 25–22
Fox Sports		boxscore		Attendance: not available

=== Round 6 ===
10 November 2016	Brisbane Bullets	86–73	Sydney Kings	Brisbane Convention Centre, Brisbane
18:30	Scoring by quarter: 19–22, 20–11, 23–27, 24–13
Fox Sports		boxscore		Attendance: not available

11 November 2016	New Zealand Breakers	79–86	Cairns Taipans	Vector Arena, Auckland
19:30	Scoring by quarter: 22–17, 18–22, 22–20, 17–27
Sky Sport		boxscore		Attendance: not available

12 November 2016	Adelaide 36ers	74–85	Illawarra Hawks	Titanium Security Arena, Adelaide
17:00	Scoring by quarter: 28–24, 18–17, 17–20, 11–24
Fox Sports		boxscore		Attendance: not available

12 November 2016	Melbourne United	71–87	Sydney Kings	Hisense Arena, Melbourne
19:30	Scoring by quarter: 29–29, 15–20, 15–14, 12–24
Fox Sports		boxscore		Attendance: not available

13 November 2016	Cairns Taipans	76–84	Brisbane Bullets	Cairns Convention Centre, Cairns
14:00	Scoring by quarter: 16–17, 27–28, 17–24, 16–15
Fox Sports		boxscore		Attendance: not available

13 November 2016	Perth Wildcats	86–87(OT)	New Zealand Breakers	Perth Arena, Perth
16:00	Scoring by quarter: 21–19, 20–27, 19–17, 19–16, Overtime: 7–8
Fox Sports		boxscore		Attendance: not available

=== Round 7 ===
17 November 2016	Perth Wildcats	93–80	Sydney Kings	Perth Arena, Perth
18:30	Scoring by quarter: 29–19, 29–27, 14–18, 21–16
Fox Sports		boxscore		Attendance: not available

18 November 2016	New Zealand Breakers	100–85	Illawarra Hawks	North Shore Events Centre, Auckland
19:30	Scoring by quarter: 33–16, 24–22, 23–31, 20–16
Sky Sport		boxscore		Attendance: not available

18 November 2016	Melbourne United	84–79	Cairns Taipans	Hisense Arena, Melbourne
19:30	Scoring by quarter: 20–12, 16–10, 28–35, 20–22
Fox Sports		boxscore		Attendance: not available

19 November 2016	Adelaide 36ers	87–105	Brisbane Bullets	Titanium Security Arena, Adelaide
17:00	Scoring by quarter: 19–31, 27–25, 20–34, 21–15
Fox Sports		boxscore		Attendance: not available

19 November 2016	Sydney Kings	83–72	Perth Wildcats	Qudos Bank Arena, Sydney
19:30	Scoring by quarter: 23–12, 17–25, 20–12, 23–18
Fox Sports		boxscore		Attendance: not available

20 November 2016	Illawarra Hawks	109–78	New Zealand Breakers	WIN Entertainment Centre, Wollongong
15:00	Scoring by quarter: 26–20, 30–24, 27–20, 26–14
Fox Sports		boxscore		Attendance: not available

=== Round 8 ===
24 November 2016	Brisbane Bullets	83–101	Adelaide 36ers	Brisbane Entertainment Centre, Brisbane
18:30	Scoring by quarter: 18–36, 20–21, 17–20, 28–24
Fox Sports		boxscore		Attendance: not available

26 November 2016	Melbourne United	95–92	Sydney Kings	Hisense Arena, Melbourne
19:30	Scoring by quarter: 26–22, 23–20, 21–22, 25–28
Fox Sports		boxscore		Attendance: not available

27 November 2016	Cairns Taipans	91–80	New Zealand Breakers	Cairns Convention Centre, Cairns
14:00	Scoring by quarter: 25–18, 28–20, 12–19, 26–23
Fox Sports		boxscore		Attendance: not available

27 November 2016	Perth Wildcats	85–89	Illawarra Hawks	Perth Arena, Perth
16:00	Scoring by quarter: 29–24, 17–28, 17–21, 22–16
Fox Sports		boxscore		Attendance: not available

28 November 2016	Sydney Kings	85–91	Adelaide 36ers	Qudos Bank Arena, Sydney
19:30	Scoring by quarter: 25–20, 19–25, 23–21, 18–25
Fox Sports		boxscore		Attendance: not available

=== Round 9 ===
1 December 2016	Perth Wildcats	75–90	Brisbane Bullets	Perth Arena, Perth
18:30	Scoring by quarter: 18–28, 11–21, 25–16, 21–25
Fox Sports		boxscore		Attendance: not available

2 December 2016	New Zealand Breakers	95–91	Illawarra Hawks	North Shore Events Centre, Auckland
19:30	Scoring by quarter: 24–29, 16–26, 23–23, 28–17
Sky Sport		boxscore		Attendance: not available

3 December 2016	Brisbane Bullets	84–89	Cairns Taipans	Brisbane Convention Centre, Brisbane
16:30	Scoring by quarter: 21–27, 17–21, 22–21, 24–20
Fox Sports		boxscore		Attendance: not available

3 December 2016	Adelaide 36ers	92–86(OT)	Perth Wildcats	Titanium Security Arena, Adelaide
19:00	Scoring by quarter: 25–19, 21–17, 22–24, 12–20, Overtime: 12–6
Fox Sports		boxscore		Attendance: 4,709

4 December 2016	Melbourne United	98–74	New Zealand Breakers	Hisense Arena, Melbourne
15:00	Scoring by quarter: 20–20, 28–18, 22–13, 28–23
Fox Sports		boxscore		Attendance: 10,300

5 December 2016	Illawarra Hawks	93–99	Sydney Kings	WIN Entertainment Centre, Wollongong
19:30	Scoring by quarter: 25–25, 19–27, 22–26, 27–21
Fox Sports		boxscore		Attendance: not available

=== Round 10 ===
8 December 2016	New Zealand Breakers	82–75	Brisbane Bullets	Vector Arena, Auckland
19:30	Scoring by quarter: 23–20, 16–19, 24–16, 19–20
Sky Sport		boxscore		Attendance: not available

9 December 2016	Cairns Taipans	78–86	Sydney Kings	Cairns Convention Centre, Cairns
18:30	Scoring by quarter: 26–16, 19–22, 18–17, 15–31
Fox Sports		boxscore		Attendance: not available

9 December 2016	Perth Wildcats	92–89	Melbourne United	Perth Arena, Perth
18:30	Scoring by quarter: 31–30, 17–14, 22–18, 22–27
Fox Sports		boxscore		Attendance: not available

10 December 2016	Adelaide 36ers	101–92	New Zealand Breakers	Titanium Security Arena, Adelaide
17:00	Scoring by quarter: 20–28, 29–19, 25–23, 28–22
Fox Sports		boxscore		Attendance: not available

10 December 2016	Brisbane Bullets	88–98	Illawarra Hawks	Brisbane Convention Centre, Brisbane
18:30	Scoring by quarter: 22–26, 23–20, 22–23, 21–29
Fox Sports		boxscore		Attendance: not available

11 December 2016	Sydney Kings	81–88	Melbourne United	Qudos Bank Arena, Sydney
15:00	Scoring by quarter: 16–20, 23–21, 18–28, 24–19
Fox Sports		boxscore		Attendance: not available

12 December 2016	Cairns Taipans	83–96	Adelaide 36ers	Cairns Convention Centre, Cairns
18:30	Scoring by quarter: 20–23, 27–19, 14–32, 22–22
Fox Sports		boxscore		Attendance: not available

=== Round 11 ===
15 December 2016	New Zealand Breakers	69–57	Perth Wildcats	Vector Arena, Auckland
19:30	Scoring by quarter: 17–15, 16–8, 21–23, 15–11
Sky Sport		boxscore		Attendance: not available

16 December 2016	Adelaide 36ers	82–80	Sydney Kings	Titanium Security Arena, Adelaide
19:00	Scoring by quarter: 31–26, 10–16, 15–23, 26–15
Fox Sports		boxscore		Attendance: not available

17 December 2016	Cairns Taipans	99–82	Illawarra Hawks	Cairns Convention Centre, Cairns
16:30	Scoring by quarter: 26–21, 19–32, 28–11, 26–18
Fox Sports		boxscore		Attendance: not available

17 December 2016	Brisbane Bullets	100–90	Melbourne United	Brisbane Convention Centre, Brisbane
18:30	Scoring by quarter: 20–23, 30–26, 29–23, 21–18
Fox Sports		boxscore		Attendance: not available

18 December 2016	Sydney Kings	96–103	Adelaide 36ers	Qudos Bank Arena, Sydney
15:00	Scoring by quarter: 26–25, 25–24, 23–30, 22–24
Fox Sports		boxscore		Attendance: 6,488

19 December 2016	Brisbane Bullets	85–91(OT)	Illawarra Hawks	Brisbane Convention Centre, Brisbane
18:30	Scoring by quarter: 17–18, 17–24, 19–21, 24–14, Overtime: 8–14
Fox Sports		boxscore		Attendance: not available

=== Round 12 ===
22 December 2016	Adelaide 36ers	78–74	Perth Wildcats	Titanium Security Arena, Adelaide
19:00	Scoring by quarter: 24–23, 17–21, 18–16, 19–14
Fox Sports		boxscore		Attendance: 6,328

23 December 2016	Sydney Kings	75–87	Illawarra Hawks	Qudos Bank Arena, Sydney
19:30	Scoring by quarter: 17–23, 21–18, 25–17, 12–29
Fox Sports		boxscore		Attendance: not available

26 December 2016	Melbourne United	97–59	Brisbane Bullets	Hisense Arena, Melbourne
19:30	Scoring by quarter: 21–24, 23–13, 20–12, 33–10
Fox Sports		boxscore		Attendance: not available

=== Round 13 ===
29 December 2016	Cairns Taipans	78–79	Melbourne United	Cairns Convention Centre, Cairns
18:30	Scoring by quarter: 21–20, 23–18, 20–24, 14–17
Fox Sports		boxscore		Attendance: not available

30 December 2016	Sydney Kings	85–80	New Zealand Breakers	Qudos Bank Arena, Sydney
19:30	Scoring by quarter: 23–20, 23–22, 15–21, 24–17
Fox Sports		boxscore		Attendance: not available

31 December 2016	Illawarra Hawks	87–95	Perth Wildcats	WIN Entertainment Centre, Wollongong
17:30	Scoring by quarter: 24–26, 23–24, 25–19, 15–26
Fox Sports		boxscore		Attendance: not available

31 December 2016	Brisbane Bullets	93–76	Cairns Taipans	Brisbane Convention Centre, Brisbane
18:30	Scoring by quarter: 18–18, 24–19, 22–24, 29–15
Fox Sports		boxscore		Attendance: not available

1 January 2017	Melbourne United	104–73	Adelaide 36ers	State Netball Hockey Centre, Melbourne
15:00	Scoring by quarter: 27–17, 33–26, 16–8, 28–22
Fox Sports		boxscore		Attendance: 3,500

=== Round 14 ===
5 January 2017	Adelaide 36ers	117–85	Illawarra Hawks	Titanium Security Arena, Adelaide
19:00	Scoring by quarter: 37–27, 30–15, 29–19, 21–24
Fox Sports		boxscore		Attendance: 8,104

6 January 2017	Cairns Taipans	65–63	New Zealand Breakers	Cairns Convention Centre, Cairns
18:30	Scoring by quarter: 11–11, 17–19, 14–17, 23–16
Fox Sports		boxscore		Attendance: not available

7 January 2017	Illawarra Hawks	106–88	Melbourne United	WIN Entertainment Centre, Wollongong
17:30	Scoring by quarter: 25–25, 32–26, 25–20, 24–17
Fox Sports		boxscore		Attendance: not available

7 January 2017	Sydney Kings	74–80	Perth Wildcats	Qudos Bank Arena, Sydney
19:30	Scoring by quarter: 18–27, 16–11, 20–19, 20–23
Fox Sports		boxscore		Attendance: not available

8 January 2017	New Zealand Breakers	95–113	Adelaide 36ers	North Shore Events Centre, Auckland
17:00	Scoring by quarter: 20–31, 20–31, 32–25, 23–26
Sky Sport		boxscore		Attendance: not available

9 January 2017	Brisbane Bullets	68–72	Perth Wildcats	Brisbane Convention Centre, Brisbane
18:30	Scoring by quarter: 13–22, 22–12, 16–10, 17–28
Fox Sports		boxscore		Attendance: not available

=== Round 15 ===
12 January 2017	Adelaide 36ers	100–73	Melbourne United	Titanium Security Arena, Adelaide
19:00	Scoring by quarter: 17–24, 24–18, 24–17, 35–14
Fox Sports		boxscore		Attendance: 7,106

13 January 2017	New Zealand Breakers	92–74	Sydney Kings	Vector Arena, Auckland
19:30	Scoring by quarter: 24–21, 19–15, 17–25, 32–13
Sky Sport		boxscore		Attendance: not available

13 January 2017	Illawarra Hawks	85–80	Brisbane Bullets	WIN Entertainment Centre, Wollongong
19:30	Scoring by quarter: 23–30, 14–19, 24–17, 24–14
Fox Sports		boxscore		Attendance: not available

14 January 2017	Melbourne United	92–85	Cairns Taipans	State Netball Hockey Centre, Melbourne
19:30	Scoring by quarter: 23–25, 23–14, 28–29, 18–17
Fox Sports		boxscore		Attendance: 3,500

14 January 2017	Perth Wildcats	84–95	Adelaide 36ers	Perth Arena, Perth
18:30	Scoring by quarter: 24–17, 20–24, 22–25, 18–29
Fox Sports		boxscore		Attendance: 13,611

15 January 2017	Brisbane Bullets	82–84	New Zealand Breakers	Brisbane Convention Centre, Brisbane
14:00	Scoring by quarter: 21–14, 22–21, 18–18, 21–31
Fox Sports		boxscore		Attendance: not available

16 January 2017	Cairns Taipans	80–78	Perth Wildcats	Cairns Convention Centre, Cairns
18:30	Scoring by quarter: 19–15, 14–19, 26–22, 21–22
Fox Sports		boxscore		Attendance: not available

=== Round 16 ===
19 January 2017	Adelaide 36ers	101–68	Brisbane Bullets	Titanium Security Arena, Adelaide
19:00	Scoring by quarter: 29–15, 29–22, 23–15, 20–16
Fox Sports		boxscore		Attendance: 7,436

20 January 2017	Illawarra Hawks	86–95	New Zealand Breakers	WIN Entertainment Centre, Wollongong
19:30	Scoring by quarter: 31–23, 21–27, 14–26, 20–19
Fox Sports		boxscore		Attendance: not available

20 January 2017	Perth Wildcats	84–78(OT)	Cairns Taipans	Perth Arena, Perth
18:30	Scoring by quarter: 22–20, 20–19, 10–16, 20–17, Overtime: 12–6
Fox Sports		boxscore		Attendance: not available

21 January 2017	Brisbane Bullets	88–71	Melbourne United	Brisbane Entertainment Centre, Brisbane
16:30	Scoring by quarter: 17–20, 24–12, 22–23, 25–16
Fox Sports		boxscore		Attendance: not available

21 January 2017	Adelaide 36ers	87–73	Sydney Kings	Titanium Security Arena, Adelaide
19:00	Scoring by quarter: 25–28, 20–9, 23–22, 19–14
Fox Sports		boxscore		Attendance: 8,096

22 January 2017	Cairns Taipans	85–79	Illawarra Hawks	Cairns Convention Centre, Cairns
14:00	Scoring by quarter: 22–15, 23–23, 22–15, 18–26
Fox Sports		boxscore		Attendance: not available

22 January 2017	New Zealand Breakers	86–82	Perth Wildcats	Vector Arena, Auckland
19:00	Scoring by quarter: 20–18, 19–16, 15–13, 32–35
Sky Sport		boxscore		Attendance: not available

=== Round 17 ===
26 January 2017	New Zealand Breakers	81–94	Cairns Taipans	North Shore Events Centre, Auckland
19:30	Scoring by quarter: 24–21, 17–23, 18–22, 22–28
Sky Sport		boxscore		Attendance: not available

27 January 2017	Brisbane Bullets	77–80	Sydney Kings	Brisbane Convention Centre, Brisbane
18:30	Scoring by quarter: 17–24, 18–12, 23–23, 19–21
Fox Sports		boxscore		Attendance: not available

28 January 2017	Illawarra Hawks	95–92	Adelaide 36ers	WIN Entertainment Centre, Wollongong
19:30	Scoring by quarter: 25–29, 19–20, 27–21, 24–22
Fox Sports		boxscore		Attendance: not available

28 January 2017	Perth Wildcats	73–71	Melbourne United	Perth Arena, Perth
18:30	Scoring by quarter: 16–19, 25–19, 14–16, 18–17
Fox Sports		boxscore		Attendance: not available

29 January 2017	Sydney Kings	84–57	New Zealand Breakers	Qudos Bank Arena, Sydney
15:00	Scoring by quarter: 23–19, 22–13, 26–7, 13–18
Fox Sports		boxscore		Attendance: not available

29 January 2017	Cairns Taipans	97–83	Brisbane Bullets	Cairns Convention Centre, Cairns
18:00	Scoring by quarter: 14–20, 30–19, 22–25, 31–19
Fox Sports		boxscore		Attendance: not available

=== Round 18 ===
3 February 2017	Illawarra Hawks	90–73	Cairns Taipans	WIN Entertainment Centre, Wollongong
19:30	Scoring by quarter: 30–23, 24–11, 17–20, 19–19
Fox Sports		boxscore		Attendance: not available

3 February 2017	Perth Wildcats	94–63	Brisbane Bullets	Perth Arena, Perth
18:30	Scoring by quarter: 29–20, 24–17, 21–12, 20–14
Fox Sports		boxscore		Attendance: not available

4 February 2017	Adelaide 36ers	87–88	New Zealand Breakers	Titanium Security Arena, Adelaide
17:00	Scoring by quarter: 16–22, 29–27, 27–12, 15–27
Fox Sports		boxscore		Attendance: not available

4 February 2017	Sydney Kings	76–89	Melbourne United	Qudos Bank Arena, Sydney
19:30	Scoring by quarter: 18–30, 21–15, 16–15, 21–29
Fox Sports		boxscore		Attendance: 11,005

5 February 2017	Cairns Taipans	85–77	Perth Wildcats	Cairns Convention Centre, Cairns
14:00	Scoring by quarter: 17–19, 19–22, 24–18, 25–18
Fox Sports		boxscore		Attendance: 4,086

6 February 2017	Melbourne United	78–72	Illawarra Hawks	Hisense Arena, Melbourne
19:30	Scoring by quarter: 20–15, 17–22, 21–15, 20–20
Fox Sports		boxscore		Attendance: 6,947

=== Round 19 ===
9 February 2017	Cairns Taipans	89–85	Adelaide 36ers	Cairns Convention Centre, Cairns
18:30	Scoring by quarter: 18–18, 31–27, 15–23, 25–17
Fox Sports		boxscore		Attendance: not available

10 February 2017	New Zealand Breakers	88–70	Melbourne United	North Shore Events Centre, Auckland
19:30	Scoring by quarter: 21–18, 17–20, 20–15, 30–17
Sky Sport		boxscore		Attendance: not available

10 February 2017	Perth Wildcats	101–74	Sydney Kings	Perth Arena, Perth
18:30	Scoring by quarter: 29–24, 27–18, 16–13, 29–19
Fox Sports		boxscore		Attendance: not available

11 February 2017	Illawarra Hawks	106–79	Brisbane Bullets	WIN Entertainment Centre, Wollongong
17:30	Scoring by quarter: 33–18, 31–16, 23–19, 19–26
Fox Sports		boxscore		Attendance: not available

11 February 2017	Adelaide 36ers	89–98	Cairns Taipans	Titanium Security Arena, Adelaide
19:00	Scoring by quarter: 24–19, 28–24, 17–33, 20–22
Fox Sports		boxscore		Attendance: not available

12 February 2017	Melbourne United	94–96	Perth Wildcats	Hisense Arena, Melbourne
15:00	Scoring by quarter: 29–21, 18–25, 18–23, 29–27
Fox Sports		boxscore		Attendance: 9,545

== Ladder ==
Pos	2016–17 NBL season											
Pos	Team	Pld	W	L	PCT	Last 5	Streak	Home	Away	PF	PA	PP
1	Adelaide 36ers	28	17	11	60.71%	1–4	L4	9–5	8–6	2582	2505	103.07%
2	Cairns Taipans^{1}	28	15	13	53.57%	4–1	W3	10–4	5–9	2305	2301	100.17%
3	Perth Wildcats^{1}	28	15	13	53.57%	4–1	W2	10–4	5–9	2294	2257	101.64%
4	Illawarra Hawks^{1}	28	15	13	53.57%	3–2	W1	9–5	6–8	2486	2444	101.72%
5	New Zealand Breakers	28	14	14	50.00%	3–2	W2	9–5	5–9	2353	2387	98.58%
6	Melbourne United^{2}	28	13	15	46.43%	2–3	L2	9–5	4–10	2351	2337	100.60%
7	Sydney Kings^{2}	28	13	15	46.43%	2–3	L2	7–7	6–8	2295	2311	99.31%
8	Brisbane Bullets	28	10	18	35.71%	1–4	L4	6–8	4–10	2268	2392	94.82%

Updated to match(es) played on 12 February 2017. Source: NBL.com.au

The NBL tie-breaker system as outlined in the NBL Rules and Regulations states that in the case of an identical win–loss record, the results in games played between the teams will determine order of seeding.

^{1}3-way Head-to-Head between Cairns Taipans (5-3), Perth Wildcats (4-4) and Illawarra Hawks (3-5).

^{2}Melbourne United won Head-to-Head (3-1).

=== Ladder progression ===
- Numbers highlighted in green indicate that the team finished the round inside the top four.
- Numbers highlighted in blue indicates the team finished first on the ladder in that round.
- Numbers highlighted in red indicates the team finished last place on the ladder in that round.

2016–17 NBL season
Team	1	2	3	4	5	6	7	8	9	10	11	12	13	14	15	16	17	18	19
Adelaide 36ers	5	6	4	4	6	7	8	7	5	2	1	1	1	1	1	1	1	1	1
Brisbane Bullets	2	2	3	3	5	4	2	3	2	6	4	7	5	6	8	8	8	8	8
Cairns Taipans	8	8	8	7	4	6	6	6	4	8	6	6	8	7	7	7	4	5	2
Illawarra Hawks	1	7	7	8	7	5	5	4	3	3	2	2	3	3	2	2	2	2	4
Melbourne United	7	4	5	5	8	8	7	8	6	5	8	4	2	4	3	4	7	3	6
New Zealand Breakers	3	5	6	6	3	3	4	5	8	7	5	5	7	8	6	3	6	7	5
Perth Wildcats	4	3	2	2	2	2	3	2	7	4	7	8	6	2	5	5	5	4	3
Sydney Kings	6	1	1	1	1	1	1	1	1	1	3	3	4	5	4	6	3	6	7

== Finals ==
The 2016–17 National Basketball League finals were played in late February and March 2017, consisting of two best-of-three semi-final series and the best-of-five Grand Final series. In the semi-finals, the higher seed hosted the first and third games. In the Grand Final, the higher seed hosted the first, third and fifth games.

=== Playoff Seedings ===
1. Adelaide 36ers
2. Cairns Taipans
3. Perth Wildcats
4. Illawarra Hawks

The NBL tie-breaker system as outlined in the NBL Rules and Regulations states that in the case of an identical win–loss record, the results in games played between the teams will determine order of seeding.

=== Playoff bracket ===
Semifinals
1	Adelaide 36ers	93	94	98
4	Illawarra Hawks	78	100	106
2	Cairns Taipans	69	66	X
3	Perth Wildcats	91	74	X

Grand Final
3	Perth Wildcats	89	89	95	X	X
4	Illawarra Hawks	77	77	86	X	X

=== Semi-finals ===
Adelaide 36ers (1) vs. Illawarra Hawks (4)

16 February 2017	Adelaide 36ers	93–78 (Series: Adelaide leads series, 1–0)	Illawarra Hawks	Titanium Security Arena, Adelaide
19:00	Scoring by quarter: 24–27, 28–15, 21–23, 20–13
Fox Sports	Pts: Randle 26; Rebs: Hodgson 11; Asts: Randle, Sobey 4	boxscore	Pts: Coenraad 26; Rebs: Ogilvy 9 Asts: Kay 4	Attendance: 5,056

19 February 2017	Illawarra Hawks	100–94 (Series: Series tied, 1–1)	Adelaide 36ers	WIN Entertainment Centre, Wollongong
15:00	Scoring by quarter: 28–22, 26–27, 25–29, 21–16
Fox Sports	Pts: Coenraad, Norton 17; Rebs: Ogilvy 11; Asts: Kay 5	boxscore	Pts: Randle 20; Rebs: Hodgson 8 Asts: Randle 7	Attendance: 3,500

23 February 2017	Adelaide 36ers	98–106 (Series: Illawarra wins series, 2–1)	Illawarra Hawks	Titanium Security Arena, Adelaide
19:00	Scoring by quarter: 18–27, 24–29, 22–26, 34–24
Fox Sports	Pts: Randle 26; Rebs: Teys 8 Asts: Randle, Sobey 6	boxscore	Pts: Clarke 20; Rebs: Forman, Holyfield 6 Asts: Coenraad, Martin 4	Attendance: 7,203

Cairns Taipans (2) vs. Perth Wildcats (3)

17 February 2017	Cairns Taipans	69–91 (Series: Perth leads series, 1–0)	Perth Wildcats	Cairns Convention Centre, Cairns
18:30	Scoring by quarter: 21–31, 16–17, 20–22, 12–21
Fox Sports	Pts: Trice 15; Rebs: McCarron 7 Asts: Gliddon 5	boxscore	Pts: Cotton 34; Rebs: Knight 6 Asts: Cotton 5	Attendance: 5,200

20 February 2017	Perth Wildcats	74–66 (Series: Perth wins series, 2–0)	Cairns Taipans	Perth Arena, Perth
18:30	Scoring by quarter: 16–8, 21–14, 15–22, 22–22
Fox Sports	Pts: Prather 24; Rebs: Prather 10; Asts: Cotton, Prather 4	boxscore	Pts: Trice 22; Rebs: Gliddon 8 Asts: Trice 5	Attendance: 10,993

=== Grand final ===
Perth Wildcats (3) vs. Illawarra Hawks (4)

26 February 2017	Perth Wildcats	89–77 (Series: Perth leads series, 1–0)	Illawarra Hawks	Perth Arena, Perth
16:00	Scoring by quarter: 21–26, 21–16, 26–20, 21–15
Fox Sports	Pts: Prather 22; Rebs: Knight 11; Asts: Martin, Prather 5	boxscore	Pts: Ellis 12; Rebs: Ogilvy 6 Asts: Clarke 6	Attendance: 10,828

1 March 2017	Illawarra Hawks	77–89 (Series: Perth leads series, 2–0)	Perth Wildcats	WIN Entertainment Centre, Wollongong
19:30	Scoring by quarter: 24–18, 21–22, 14–23, 18–26
Fox Sports	Pts: Clarke, Ogilvy 21; Rebs: Ogilvy 10; Asts: Kay 5	boxscore	Pts: Cotton 20; Rebs: Brandt 11; Asts: Martin, Prather 6	Attendance: 5,036

5 March 2017	Perth Wildcats	95–86 (Series: Perth wins series, 3–0)	Illawarra Hawks	Perth Arena, Perth
12:00	Scoring by quarter: 26–17, 20–24, 25–22, 24–23
Fox Sports	Pts: Cotton 45; Rebs: Brandt, McKay 7 Asts: Brandt, Prather 4	boxscore	Pts: Clarke 30; Rebs: Ogilvy 7 Asts: Clarke, Harris, Kay, Norton 3	Attendance: 13,611

== Awards ==
=== Player of the Month ===
Month	Player	Team
October	Chris Goulding	Melbourne United
November	Brad Newley	Sydney Kings
December	Kevin Lisch	Sydney Kings
January	Jerome Randle	Adelaide 36ers

=== Coach of the Month ===
Month	Player	Team
October	Andrew Gaze	Sydney Kings
November	Joey Wright	Adelaide 36ers
December	Joey Wright	Adelaide 36ers
January	Joey Wright	Adelaide 36ers

=== Pre-season ===
- Most Valuable Player (Ray Borner Medal): Cameron Gliddon, Cairns Taipans

=== Season ===
- Most Valuable Player (Andrew Gaze Trophy): Jerome Randle, Adelaide 36ers
- Rookie of the Year: Anthony Drmic, Adelaide 36ers
- Best Defensive Player: Torrey Craig, Brisbane Bullets
- Best Sixth Man: Rotnei Clarke, Illawarra Hawks
- Most Improved Player: Nathan Sobey, Adelaide 36ers
- Coach of the Year (Lindsay Gaze Trophy): Joey Wright, Adelaide 36ers
- Referee of the Year: Vaughan Mayberry
- All-NBL First Team:
  - Jerome Randle – Adelaide 36ers
  - Casper Ware – Melbourne United
  - Casey Prather – Perth Wildcats
  - Daniel Johnson – Adelaide 36ers
  - Andrew Ogilvy – Illawarra Hawks
- All-NBL Second Team:
  - Kevin Lisch – Sydney Kings
  - Nathan Sobey – Adelaide 36ers
  - Brad Newley – Sydney Kings
  - Torrey Craig – Brisbane Bullets
  - Daniel Kickert – Brisbane Bullets

=== Finals ===
- Grand Final Series MVP (Larry Sengstock Medal): Bryce Cotton, Perth Wildcats
