= 2021–22 Cairns Taipans season =

- Head coach: (Australia) Adam Forde
- Captain: (Brazil) Scott Machado
- Arena: Cairns Convention Centre

NBL results
- Record: 9–19 (32.1%)
- Ladder: 9th
- Finals finish: Did not qualify
- Stats at NBL.com.au

Player records
- Points: (United States) McCall 16.1
- Rebounds: (United States) Zimmerman 9.6
- Assists: (United States) McCall 5.6
- All statistics correct as of 24 April 2022.

The 2021–22 NBL season was the 23rd season for the Cairns Taipans in the NBL, and their first under the leadership of their new head coach Adam Forde.

== Squad ==
=== Signings ===
- Imports Scott Machado and Cameron Oliver, and Next Star Mojave King had already signed two-season contracts the season prior.
- After their penultimate game of the 2020–21 season, the Taipans announced that head coach Mike Kelly would not be returning for the 2021–22 season.
- On 25 June, the team option on Jordan Ngatai's contract was taken up by the club. His original contract was a two-year contract (with the second year being a team option), having only joined the Taipans at the start of the 2020–21 season.
- On 26 June, Kouat Noi signed a new two-season contract with the club (the second year being a mutual option). This extends his time in Cairns up to potentially four seasons, having joined the team before the 2019–20 season. Nathan Jawai and the club also took up their mutual option on the second year of his contract, extending his time in Cairns to seven seasons.
- On 27 June, the final day before free agency began, the Taipans took up the mutual option on the contract of Majok Deng. They also abandoned the option on the contract of Mirko Đerić, instead signing him to a three-year deal (the final year being a mutual option).
- On 29 June, Adam Forde was announced as the club's new head coach, signing on a two-year deal. Forde joined the club as an experienced coach in the NBL, having spent eight years as an assistant coach with the Perth Wildcats, followed by a two-year stint with the Sydney Kings, both as an assistant coach and as a head coach.
- On 13 July, Deng re-signed for three seasons, overriding the mutual option that himself and the club had taken up weeks earlier. The new extension will see Deng remain in Cairns until 2024.
- On 14 July, King was transferred to the Adelaide 36ers.
- On 19 July, Keanu Pinder was signed as the club's first new player for the season. He signed on a two-year deal (second-year mutual option).
- On 24 July, Jarrod Kenny re-signed with the Taipans for the 2021–22 season. This will be Kenny’s fourth season with the Taipans after he joined the club for the 2018–19 season.
- On 5 August, Sam Gruggen was signed as an assistant coach on a two-year deal. Gruggen joined the club after serving as an assistant coach for Forde during the 2020–21 season, as well as serving time with the Townsville Crocodiles.
- On 6 August, Tahjere McCall signed with the Taipans on a one-year deal. McCall joined the Taipans after serving as an injury replacement player with Orléans Loiret Basket and winning the NBA G League championship with the Lakeland Magic. During his time with the Magic, McCall was voted into the G League's All-Defensive Team.
- 13 August, Bul Kuol was signed on a two-year deal and filled the final place on the roster. Kuol played College basketball with the California Baptist Lancers and Detroit Mercy Titans before returning to Australia, where he averaged 18.2 points and 4.8 rebounds with the Knox Raiders of the NBL1 South.
- On 18 August, Kerry Williams was signed as the second assistant coach. Williams spent the season prior as the head coach of the Cairns Marlins of the NBL1 North, and before that also spent multiple seasons with the Cairns Dolphins of the Queensland Basketball League. Williams also spent five seasons with the Taipans as a player before transitioning into a front office role with the club.
- On 16 September, the Taipans announced that import Cameron Oliver had been released from the final year of his contract after signing an Exhibit 10 contract with a California based National Basketball Association team, later revealed to be the Los Angeles Lakers.
- On 17 September, Stephen Zimmerman was signed as Oliver's replacement on a one-year deal. Zimmerman signed with the club after winning the Czech National Basketball League with Basketball Nymburk, where he averaged 8.9 points and 7.9 rebounds across 17 minutes per game.
- On 7 October, Brayden Inger was signed by the Taipans as a development player. He joined the club after competing in the NZNBL with the Southland Sharks.
- On 30 December, Marshall Nelson was signed as an Injury Replacement Player for Machado.

=== Roster ===
Note: Flags indicate national team eligibility at FIBA-sanctioned events. Players may hold other non-FIBA nationalities not displayed.

2021–22 Cairns Taipans roster
Players
Coaches

Pos.	No.	Nat.	Name	Ht.	Wt.	Age
G	3	(Brazil)	Machado, Scott (injured) (I & C)	1.85 m (6 ft 1 in)	82 kg (181 lb)	36 – 8 June 1990
G	5	(Australia)	Đerić, Mirko	1.88 m (6 ft 2 in)	82 kg (181 lb)	31 – 17 April 1995
G	6	(New Zealand)	Kenny, Jarrod	1.88 m (6 ft 2 in)	87 kg (192 lb)	41 – 17 September 1985
F	9	(New Zealand)	Inger, Brayden (DP)	2.03 m (6 ft 8 in)	95 kg (209 lb)	27 – 18 March 1999
G	10	(Australia)	Ayre, Ben	1.88 m (6 ft 2 in)	82 kg (181 lb)	30 – 8 December 1995
F	11	(New Zealand)	Ngatai, Jordan	1.96 m (6 ft 5 in)	98 kg (216 lb)	33 – 7 March 1993
F	12	(Australia)	Noi, Kouat	2.01 m (6 ft 7 in)	93 kg (205 lb)	29 – 29 October 1997
F	13	(South Sudan)	Deng, Majok	2.08 m (6 ft 10 in)	84 kg (185 lb)	33 – 1 March 1993
C	15	(Australia)	Jawai, Nathan	2.09 m (6 ft 10 in)	140 kg (309 lb)	40 – 10 October 1986
G	22	(United States)	McCall, Tahjere (I)	1.93 m (6 ft 4 in)	86 kg (190 lb)	32 – 17 August 1994
F	25	(Australia)	Pinder, Keanu	2.05 m (6 ft 9 in)	100 kg (220 lb)	31 – 28 May 1995
C	33	(United States)	Zimmerman, Stephen (I)	2.11 m (6 ft 11 in)	109 kg (240 lb)	30 – 9 October 1996
F	42	(South Sudan)	Kuol, Bul	2.01 m (6 ft 7 in)	93 kg (205 lb)	29 – 10 January 1997
G	44	(Australia)	Nelson, Marshall	1.88 m (6 ft 2 in)	85 kg (187 lb)	32 – 31 January 1994
G	45	(Australia)	Heath, Robbie (TP)	1.90 m (6 ft 3 in)	82 kg (181 lb)	27 – 27 November 1998

Head coach

- (Australia) Adam Forde

Assistant coach(es)

- (Australia) Sam Gruggen
- (Australia) Kerry Williams

Legend

- (C) Team captain
- (DP) Development player
- (IN) Inactive
- (I) Import player
- (SRP) Special restricted player
- (NS) Next Star player
- Injured

- Roster
Updated: 2 April 2022

=== Depth chart ===
Pos.	Starting 5	Bench 1	Bench 2	Development
C	Stephen Zimmerman	Nathan Jawai
PF	Majok Deng	Keanu Pinder
SF	Kouat Noi	Jordan Ngatai	Bul Kuol	Brayden Inger
SG	Tahjere McCall	Mirko Djeric
PG	Scott Machado	Jarrod Kenny		Robbie Heath

== Pre-season ==
=== Game log ===
2021 NBL Blitz game log
Total: 0–5 (Home: 0–3; Road: 0–2)
November: 0–5 (Home: 0–3; Road: 0–2)

Game	Date	Team	Score	High points	High rebounds	High assists	Location Attendance	Record
1	14 November	Adelaide	L 87–91 (OT)	Deng, Zimmerman (18)	Stephen Zimmerman (11)	Scott Machado (5)	MyState Bank Arena not available	0–1
2	16 November	Tasmania	L 66–81	Stephen Zimmerman (16)	Stephen Zimmerman (11)	Scott Machado (9)	MyState Bank Arena not available	0–2
3	21 November	@ Perth	L 96–87	Nate Jawai (21)	Tahjere McCall (13)	Tahjere McCall (6)	Ulverstone Sports & Leisure Centre not available	0–3
4	24 November	Brisbane	L 86–94	Tahjere McCall (17)	Keanu Pinder (10)	Noi, Machado (5)	Ulverstone Sports & Leisure Centre not available	0–4
5	26 November	@ Tasmania	L 83–68	Kouat Noi (12)	Stephen Zimmerman (8)	Tahjere McCall (5)	Elphin Sports Centre not available	0–5

== Regular season ==
=== Ladder ===
Pos	2021–22 NBL season											
Pos	Team	Pld	W	L	PCT	Last 5	Streak	Home	Away	PF	PA	PP
1	Melbourne United	28	20	8	71.43%	4–1	L1	9–5	11–3	2455	2244	109.40%
2	Illawarra Hawks	28	19	9	67.86%	4–1	W2	8–6	11–3	2498	2345	106.52%
3	Sydney Kings	28	19	9	67.86%	3–2	L1	9–5	10–4	2397	2313	103.63%
4	Tasmania JackJumpers	28	17	11	60.71%	4–1	W4	8–6	9–5	2230	2220	100.45%
5	Perth Wildcats	28	16	12	57.14%	2–3	L2	7–7	9–5	2495	2377	104.96%
6	S.E. Melbourne Phoenix	28	15	13	53.57%	3–2	W2	7–7	8–6	2456	2424	101.32%
7	Adelaide 36ers	28	10	18	35.71%	3–2	W1	6–8	4–10	2283	2346	97.31%
8	Brisbane Bullets	28	10	18	35.71%	2–3	L2	6–8	4–10	2379	2500	95.16%
9	Cairns Taipans	28	9	19	32.14%	1–4	W1	5–9	4–10	2228	2408	92.52%
10	New Zealand Breakers	28	5	23	17.86%	0–5	L10	2–12	3–11	2234	2478	90.15%

Updated to match(es) played on 24 April 2022. Source: NBL.com.au

=== Ladder progression ===
- Numbers highlighted in green indicate that the team finished the round inside the top four.
- Numbers highlighted in blue indicates the team finished first on the ladder in that round.
- Numbers highlighted in red indicates the team finished last place on the ladder in that round.

2021–22 NBL season
Team	1	2	3	4	5	6	7	8	9	10	11	12	13	14	15	16	17	18	19	20	21
Adelaide 36ers	8	6	8	8	8	8	7	8	8	8	8	7	8	8	8	8	8	9	9	8	7
Brisbane Bullets	7	5	7	6	6	7	6	5	7	9	7	8	7	7	7	7	7	7	7	7	8
Cairns Taipans	9	7	4	4	5	5	5	6	9	7	9	10	9	9	10	9	9	8	8	9	9
Illawarra Hawks	3	2	3	3	3	3	3	4	4	5	4	5	4	4	5	4	4	3	3	3	2
Melbourne United	6	9	6	5	4	4	1	1	2	3	1	1	1	1	1	1	1	1	1	1	1
New Zealand Breakers	10	10	10	10	10	10	10	10	10	10	10	9	10	10	9	10	10	10	10	10	10
Perth Wildcats	2	3	1	1	1	1	2	2	3	1	2	3	3	3	2	2	3	4	4	4	5
S.E. Melbourne Phoenix	1	1	2	2	2	2	4	3	1	2	3	2	2	2	4	5	5	6	6	6	6
Sydney Kings	5	4	5	7	7	6	8	7	5	6	5	4	5	5	3	3	2	2	2	2	3
Tasmania JackJumpers	4	8	9	9	9	9	9	9	6	4	6	6	6	6	6	6	6	5	5	5	4

=== Game log ===
2021–22 game log
Total: 9–19 (Home: 5–9; Road: 4–10)
December: 2–2 (Home: 2–1; Road: 0–1)

Game	Date	Team	Score	High points	High rebounds	High assists	Location Attendance	Record
1	5 December	@ Perth	L 90–67	Kouat Noi (17)	Stephen Zimmerman (14)	Scott Machado (6)	RAC Arena, Perth; 10,800	0–1
2	11 December	Tasmania	W 69–62	Tahjere McCall (20)	Stephen Zimmerman (12)	Tahjere McCall (5)	Cairns Convention Centre; 4,015	1–1
3	18 December	Adelaide	W 93–67	Majok Deng (23)	Stephen Zimmerman (9)	Tahjere McCall (10)	Cairns Convention Centre; 3,314	2–1
4	31 December	Perth	L 78–84	Majok Deng (27)	Stephen Zimmerman (9)	Kenny, Kuol, Noi (4)	Cairns Convention Centre; 4,339	2–2

January: 0–2 (Home: 0–1; Road: 0–1)

Game	Date	Team	Score	High points	High rebounds	High assists	Location Attendance	Record
5	25 January	@ S.E. Melbourne	L 87–77	Tahjere McCall (16)	Stephen Zimmerman (8)	Tahjere McCall (9)	Gippsland Regional Indoor Sports Stadium; 2,634	2–3
6	29 January	Illawarra	L 75–94	Tahjere McCall (19)	Keanu Pinder (12)	Tahjere McCall (6)	Cairns Convention Centre; 3,095	2–4

February: 2–5 (Home: 1–2; Road: 1–3)

Game	Date	Team	Score	High points	High rebounds	High assists	Location Attendance	Record
7	5 February	@ Brisbane	W 94–102	Deng, Kuol (26)	Stephen Zimmerman (14)	Tahjere McCall (6)	Nissan Arena; 2,695	3–4
8	12 February	@ Illawarra	L 87–81	Tahjere McCall (17)	Keanu Pinder (9)	Tahjere McCall (4)	WIN Entertainment Centre; 2,652	3–5
9	14 February	New Zealand	L 83–84	Majok Deng (21)	Stephen Zimmerman (11)	Tahjere McCall (6)	Cairns Convention Centre; 2,795	3–6
10	18 February	@ Illawarra	L 79–54	Majok Deng (11)	Stephen Zimmerman (8)	Tahjere McCall (3)	WIN Entertainment Centre; 2,275	3–7
11	20 February	@ Adelaide	L 82–71	Stephen Zimmerman (21)	Stephen Zimmerman (13)	Tahjere McCall (5)	Adelaide Entertainment Centre; 5,068	3–8
12	24 February	Brisbane	W 73–69	Scott Machado (17)	Stephen Zimmerman (12)	Scott Machado (7)	Cairns Convention Centre; 2,853	4–8
13	27 February	Melbourne	L 73–89	Tahjere McCall (16)	Keanu Pinder (9)	Tahjere McCall (7)	Cairns Convention Centre; 3,272	4–9

March: 2–5 (Home: 0–3; Road: 2–2)

Game	Date	Team	Score	High points	High rebounds	High assists	Location Attendance	Record
14	6 March	@ Sydney	L 98–88	Scott Machado (26)	Stephen Zimmerman (14)	Scott Machado (8)	Qudos Bank Arena; 9,112	4–10
15	11 March	Tasmania	L 69–85	Stephen Zimmerman (19)	Stephen Zimmerman (8)	Kenny, Machado (5)	Cairns Convention Centre; 3,300	4–11
16	13 March	Sydney	L 77–86	Tahjere McCall (21)	Majok Deng (8)	Tahjere McCall (7)	Cairns Convention Centre; 3,629	4–12
17	18 March	@ Adelaide	L 83–57	Keanu Pinder (15)	Keanu Pinder (14)	Scott Machado (6)	Adelaide Entertainment Centre; 3,596	4–13
18	20 March	@ Brisbane	W 88–98	Tahjere McCall (21)	Keanu Pinder (9)	Scott Machado (11)	Nissan Arena; 2,409	5–13
19	25 March	S.E. Melbourne	L 74–86	Tahjere McCall (14)	McCall, Pinder (9)	McCall, Machado (5)	Cairns Convention Centre; 3,044	5–14
20	27 March	@ New Zealand	W 90–93	Kouat Noi (19)	Deng, Noi (6)	Scott Machado (6)	Cairns Convention Centre closed event	6–14

April: 3–5 (Home: 2–2; Road: 1–3)

Game	Date	Team	Score	High points	High rebounds	High assists	Location Attendance	Record
21	2 April	S.E. Melbourne	W 90–85	Keanu Pinder (21)	Keanu Pinder (13)	Scott Machado (11)	Cairns Convention Centre; 3,206	7–14
22	4 April	@ New Zealand	W 77–87	Keanu Pinder (21)	Kouat Noi (14)	Scott Machado (6)	MyState Bank Arena closed event	8–14
23	8 April	@ Tasmania	L 87–80	Nathan Jawai (17)	Keanu Pinder (9)	Scott Machado (6)	MyState Bank Arena; 4,738	8–15
24	10 April	Melbourne	L 63–92	Keanu Pinder (15)	Keanu Pinder (12)	Ben Ayre (5)	Cairns Convention Centre; 3,418	8–16
25	16 April	@ Perth	L 106–87	Keanu Pinder (24)	Keanu Pinder (8)	Tahjere McCall (11)	RAC Arena; 10,314	8–17
26	18 April	@ Melbourne	L 92–80	Ben Ayre (20)	Keanu Pinder (9)	Ben Ayre (10)	John Cain Arena; 6,042	8–18
27	21 April	Sydney	L 77–87	Tahjere McCall (22)	Keanu Pinder (14)	Tahjere McCall (4)	Cairns Convention Centre; 3,150	8–19
28	23 April	Brisbane	W 112–98	Tahjere McCall (42)	Keanu Pinder (7)	Tahjere McCall (10)	Cairns Convention Centre; 3,552	9–19

2021–22 season schedule

== Awards ==
=== Club awards ===
- Club MVP: Tahjere McCall

== See also ==
- 2021–22 NBL season
- Cairns Taipans
