= 2021–22 Melbourne United season =

- Regular season champions
- Head coach: (Australia) Dean Vickerman
- Captain: (Australia) Chris Goulding
- Arena: John Cain Arena

NBL results
- Record: 20–8 (71.4%)
- Ladder: 1st
- Finals finish: Semifinalist (lost to JackJumpers 1–2)
- Stats at NBL.com.au

Player records
- Points: (South Sudan) Lual-Acuil 16.6
- Rebounds: (South Sudan) Lual-Acuil 9.2
- Assists: (Australia) Dellavedova 4.9
- All statistics correct as of 2 May 2022.

The 2021–22 NBL season was the 39th season for Melbourne United in the NBL, and their 8th under the banner of Melbourne United.

== Roster ==
Note: Flags indicate national team eligibility at FIBA-sanctioned events. Players may hold other non-FIBA nationalities not displayed.

2021–22 Melbourne United roster
Players
Coaches

Pos.	No.	Nat.	Name	Ht.	Wt.	Age
C	0	(South Sudan)	Lual-Acuil, Jo	2.11 m (6 ft 11 in)	103 kg (227 lb)	32 – 26 April 1994
G	1	(Australia)	Triplett, Zac (DP)	1.98 m (6 ft 6 in)	85 kg (187 lb)	24 – 19 October 2001
G/F	4	(Australia)	Newley, Brad	1.98 m (6 ft 6 in)	96 kg (212 lb)	41 – 18 February 1985
G	6	(Australia)	Hickey, William (DP)	1.94 m (6 ft 4 in)	92 kg (203 lb)	27 – 18 January 1999
G	7	(Nigeria)	Agada, Caleb (I)	1.93 m (6 ft 4 in)	95 kg (209 lb)	32 – 31 August 1994
G	8	(Australia)	Dellavedova, Matthew	1.93 m (6 ft 4 in)	91 kg (201 lb)	36 – 8 September 1990
F/C	12	(Australia)	Dalton, Callum (injured)	2.06 m (6 ft 9 in)	115 kg (254 lb)	26 – 4 May 2000
G/F	13	(New Zealand)	Prewster, Dion	1.95 m (6 ft 5 in)	96 kg (212 lb)	36 – 10 January 1990
F	14	(Australia)	White, Jack	2.00 m (6 ft 7 in)	102 kg (225 lb)	29 – 5 August 1997
C	15	(Germany)	Hukporti, Ariel (NS)	2.13 m (7 ft 0 in)	113 kg (249 lb)	24 – 12 April 2002
G	18	(Japan)	Baba, Yudai (SRP)	1.96 m (6 ft 5 in)	90 kg (198 lb)	30 – 7 November 1995
F	20	(Australia)	Barlow, David	2.05 m (6 ft 9 in)	103 kg (227 lb)	42 – 22 October 1983
F	22	(Australia)	Peatling, Mason	2.03 m (6 ft 8 in)	105 kg (231 lb)	29 – 31 March 1997
F	35	(Australia)	Okwera, David (DP)	2.08 m (6 ft 10 in)	90 kg (198 lb)	24 – 31 July 2002
G	43	(Australia)	Goulding, Chris (C)	1.92 m (6 ft 4 in)	92 kg (203 lb)	37 – 24 October 1988
G	51	(New Zealand)	Ili, Shea	1.84 m (6 ft 0 in)	87 kg (192 lb)	33 – 6 October 1992

Head coach

- (Australia) Dean Vickerman

Assistant coach(es)

- (Australia) Rhys Carter
- (Australia) Darryl McDonald
- (Australia) Justin Schueller

Team manager

- (Australia) Stephan Semerci

Legend

- (C) Team captain
- (DP) Development player
- (IN) Inactive
- (I) Import player
- (SRP) Special restricted player
- (NS) Next Star player
- Injured

- Roster
Updated: 23 March 2022

== Standings ==
=== Ladder ===
Pos	2021–22 NBL season											
Pos	Team	Pld	W	L	PCT	Last 5	Streak	Home	Away	PF	PA	PP
1	Melbourne United	28	20	8	71.43%	4–1	L1	9–5	11–3	2455	2244	109.40%
2	Illawarra Hawks	28	19	9	67.86%	4–1	W2	8–6	11–3	2498	2345	106.52%
3	Sydney Kings	28	19	9	67.86%	3–2	L1	9–5	10–4	2397	2313	103.63%
4	Tasmania JackJumpers	28	17	11	60.71%	4–1	W4	8–6	9–5	2230	2220	100.45%
5	Perth Wildcats	28	16	12	57.14%	2–3	L2	7–7	9–5	2495	2377	104.96%
6	S.E. Melbourne Phoenix	28	15	13	53.57%	3–2	W2	7–7	8–6	2456	2424	101.32%
7	Adelaide 36ers	28	10	18	35.71%	3–2	W1	6–8	4–10	2283	2346	97.31%
8	Brisbane Bullets	28	10	18	35.71%	2–3	L2	6–8	4–10	2379	2500	95.16%
9	Cairns Taipans	28	9	19	32.14%	1–4	W1	5–9	4–10	2228	2408	92.52%
10	New Zealand Breakers	28	5	23	17.86%	0–5	L10	2–12	3–11	2234	2478	90.15%

Updated to match(es) played on 24 April 2022. Source: NBL.com.au

The NBL tie-breaker system as outlined in the NBL Rules and Regulations states that in the case of an identical win–loss record, the overall points percentage will determine order of seeding.

=== Ladder progression ===
- Numbers highlighted in green indicate that the team finished the round inside the top four.
- Numbers highlighted in blue indicates the team finished first on the ladder in that round.
- Numbers highlighted in red indicates the team finished last place on the ladder in that round.

2021–22 NBL season
Team	1	2	3	4	5	6	7	8	9	10	11	12	13	14	15	16	17	18	19	20	21
Adelaide 36ers	8	6	8	8	8	8	7	8	8	8	8	7	8	8	8	8	8	9	9	8	7
Brisbane Bullets	7	5	7	6	6	7	6	5	7	9	7	8	7	7	7	7	7	7	7	7	8
Cairns Taipans	9	7	4	4	5	5	5	6	9	7	9	10	9	9	10	9	9	8	8	9	9
Illawarra Hawks	3	2	3	3	3	3	3	4	4	5	4	5	4	4	5	4	4	3	3	3	2
Melbourne United	6	9	6	5	4	4	1	1	2	3	1	1	1	1	1	1	1	1	1	1	1
New Zealand Breakers	10	10	10	10	10	10	10	10	10	10	10	9	10	10	9	10	10	10	10	10	10
Perth Wildcats	2	3	1	1	1	1	2	2	3	1	2	3	3	3	2	2	3	4	4	4	5
S.E. Melbourne Phoenix	1	1	2	2	2	2	4	3	1	2	3	2	2	2	4	5	5	6	6	6	6
Sydney Kings	5	4	5	7	7	6	8	7	5	6	5	4	5	5	3	3	2	2	2	2	3
Tasmania JackJumpers	4	8	9	9	9	9	9	9	6	4	6	6	6	6	6	6	6	5	5	5	4

== Game log ==
=== Pre-season ===
2021 NBL Blitz game log
Total: 1–3 (home: 1–1; road: 0–2)
November: 1–3 (Home: 1–1; Road: 0–2)

Game	Date	Team	Score	High points	High rebounds	High assists	Location Attendance	Record
1	13 November	New Zealand	W 90–84	Jo Lual-Acuil (37)	Jo Lual-Acuil (11)	Matthew Dellavedova (6)	Melbourne Sports and Aquatic Centre closed event	1–0
2	15 November	@ Sydney	L 80–75	Jo Lual-Acuil (13)	Mason Peatling (8)	Caleb Agada (4)	Melbourne Sports and Aquatic Centre closed event	1–1
3	20 November	Illawarra	L 90–97	Jo Lual-Acuil (20)	Jo Lual-Acuil (9)	Matthew Dellavedova (6)	Melbourne Sports and Aquatic Centre closed event	1–2
4	28 November	@ S.E. Melbourne	L 89–87	Chris Goulding (26)	Jo Lual-Acuil (10)	Matthew Dellavedova (9)	Melbourne Sports Centre closed event	1–3

=== Regular season ===
2021–22 game log
Total: 20–8 (home: 9–5; road: 11–3)
December: 3–2 (Home: 2–1; Road: 1–1)

Game	Date	Team	Score	High points	High rebounds	High assists	Location Attendance	Record
1	5 December	@ Sydney	L 79–74	Jo Lual-Acuil (12)	Mason Peatling (9)	Matthew Dellavedova (6)	Qudos Bank Arena; 8,632	0–1
2	12 December	S.E. Melbourne	L 86–94	Matthew Dellavedova (19)	Dellavedova, Newley (9)	Matthew Dellavedova (5)	John Cain Arena; 6,361	0–2
3	16 December	Sydney	W 89–47	Caleb Agada (21)	Jo Lual-Acuil (8)	Matthew Dellavedova (5)	John Cain Arena; 4,786	1–2
4	19 December	New Zealand	W 83–60	Chris Goulding (21)	Jo Lual-Acuil (9)	Matthew Dellavedova (7)	John Cain Arena; 5,479	2–2
5	26 December	@ Sydney	W 68–82	Caleb Agada (24)	Caleb Agada (14)	Matthew Dellavedova (4)	Qudos Bank Arena; 4,725	3–2

January: 5–1 (Home: 0–0; Road: 5–1)

Game	Date	Team	Score	High points	High rebounds	High assists	Location Attendance	Record
6	1 January	@ Tasmania	W 72–76	Jo Lual-Acuil (19)	Jo Lual-Acuil (8)	Matthew Dellavedova (5)	MyState Bank Arena; 4,685	4–2
7	14 January	@ New Zealand	W 78–89	Chris Goulding (23)	Jo Lual-Acuil (13)	Matthew Dellavedova (5)	MyState Bank Arena closed event	5–2
8	16 January	@ Illawarra	W 84–88	Matthew Dellavedova (33)	Caleb Agada (15)	Matthew Dellavedova (8)	WIN Entertainment Centre; 1,753	6–2
9	22 January	@ Adelaide	W 78–97	Goulding, Lual-Acuil (18)	Jo Lual-Acuil (8)	Shea Ili (7)	Adelaide Entertainment Centre; 4,819	7–2
10	26 January	@ Brisbane	W 82–84	Matthew Dellavedova (16)	Jo Lual-Acuil (10)	Agada, Ili (4)	Nissan Arena; 2,479	8–2
11	30 January	@ Adelaide	L 88–83 (OT)	Jo Lual-Acuil (23)	Jo Lual-Acuil (12)	Matthew Dellavedova (9)	Adelaide Entertainment Centre; 4,906	8–3

February: 4–1 (Home: 3–1; Road: 1–0)

Game	Date	Team	Score	High points	High rebounds	High assists	Location Attendance	Record
12	6 February	Tasmania	L 85–94	Chris Goulding (29)	Jo Lual-Acuil (21)	Shea Ili (5)	John Cain Arena; 8,499	8–4
13	12 February	Perth	W 93–87	Jo Lual-Acuil (22)	Agada, Lual-Acuil (13)	Matthew Dellavedova (5)	John Cain Arena; 6,401	9–4
14	17 February	S.E. Melbourne	W 94–87	Jo Lual-Acuil (30)	Jack White (14)	Shea Ili (8)	John Cain Arena; 5,012	10–4
15	20 February	New Zealand	W 108–73	Caleb Agada (17)	Caleb Agada (9)	Matthew Dellavedova (9)	John Cain Arena; 6,033	11–4
16	27 February	@ Cairns	W 73–89	Chris Goulding (21)	Hukporti, Peatling, White (8)	Matthew Dellavedova (5)	Cairns Convention Centre; 3,272	12–4

March: 3–2 (Home: 2–2; Road: 1–0)

Game	Date	Team	Score	High points	High rebounds	High assists	Location Attendance	Record
17	5 March	Brisbane	W 95–83	Jo Lual-Acuil (20)	Lual-Acuil, White (8)	Shea Ili (6)	John Cain Arena; 6,086	13–4
18	10 March	Perth	L 87–97	Jo Lual-Acuil (16)	Jack White (9)	Matthew Dellavedova (5)	John Cain Arena; 4,169	13–5
19	13 March	@ S.E. Melbourne	W 90–98	Matthew Dellavedova (22)	Jo Lual-Acuil (15)	Shea Ili (5)	John Cain Arena; 8,319	14–5
20	20 March	Adelaide	W 101–74	Lual-Acuil, Newley (15)	Jo Lual-Acuil (9)	Chris Goulding (6)	John Cain Arena; 5,814	15–5
21	27 March	Illawarra	L 77–92	Jo Lual-Acuil (18)	Caleb Agada (13)	Caleb Agada (5)	John Cain Arena; 5,017	15–6

April: 5–2 (Home: 2–1; Road: 3–1)

Game	Date	Team	Score	High points	High rebounds	High assists	Location Attendance	Record
22	2 April	Illawarra	L 90–96	Jack White (17)	Hukporti, Lual-Acuil, Newley (5)	Shea Ili (5)	John Cain Arena; 4,517	15–7
23	4 April	@ Perth	W 75–84	Chris Goulding (18)	Jack White (10)	Matthew Dellavedova (6)	RAC Arena; 10,192	16–7
24	7 April	@ S.E. Melbourne	W 88–90	Chris Goulding (20)	Jo Lual-Acuil (11)	Dellavedova, Ili, Lual-Acuil (4)	John Cain Arena; 4,167	17–7
25	10 April	@ Cairns	W 63–92	Jo Lual-Acuil (23)	Jo Lual-Acuil (11)	Matthew Dellavedova (7)	Cairns Convention Centre; 3,418	18–7
26	16 April	Brisbane	W 88–79	Jo Lual-Acuil (25)	Jo Lual-Acuil (13)	Shea Ili (8)	John Cain Arena; 5,721	19–7
27	18 April	Cairns	W 92–80	Chris Goulding (27)	Ariel Hukporti (9)	Shea Ili (8)	John Cain Arena; 6,042	20–7
28	23 April	@ Tasmania	L 83–61	Caleb Agada (22)	Agada, Lual-Acuil (8)	Chris Goulding (3)	MyState Bank Arena; 4,865	20–8

2021–22 season schedule

=== Postseason ===
2022 finals game log
Total: 1–1 (home: 1–0; road: 0–1)
Semifinals: 1–1 (Home: 1–0; Road: 0–1)

Game	Date	Team	Score	High points	High rebounds	High assists	Location Attendance	Series
1	28 April	Tasmania	W 74–63	Caleb Agada (16)	Jack White (10)	Matthew Dellavedova (5)	John Cain Arena; 5,268	1–0
2	30 April	@ Tasmania	L 79–72	Chris Goulding (18)	Jack White (8)	Agada, Dellavedova, Ili, Lual-Acuil (3)	MyStateBank Arena; 4,865	1–1
3	2 May	Tasmania	L 73–76	Shea Ili (18)	Jack White (15)	Matthew Dellavedova (7)	John Cain Arena; 4,816	1–2

2022 finals schedule

== Transactions ==
=== Re-signed ===
Player	Signed
Shea Ili	27 June
Jo Lual-Acuil	30 June
David Barlow	5 July
Ariel Hukporti	27 April

=== Additions ===
Player	Signed	Former team
Zac Triplett	27 June	Portland Pilots
Brad Newley	8 July	Sydney Kings
Matthew Dellavedova	9 July	Cleveland Cavaliers
Dion Prewster	20 July	Wellington Saints
Ariel Hukporti	28 July	Nevėžis Kėdainiai
David Okwera	28 July	Australian Institute of Sport
Callum Dalton	30 July	Brisbane Bullets
Caleb Agada	24 August	Hapoel Be'er Sheva
William Hickey	9 September	Ballarat Miners
Yudai Baba	23 March	Texas Legends

=== Subtractions ===
Player	Reason left	New team
Sam McDaniel	Free agent	Tasmania JackJumpers
Mitch McCarron	Free agent	Adelaide 36ers
Jock Landale	Free agent	San Antonio Spurs
Scotty Hopson	Free agent	Oklahoma City Thunder
Yudai Baba	Free agent	Texas Legends
David Andersen	Retired	N/A
Sam Short	Free agent	New Zealand Breakers

== Awards ==
=== Club awards ===
- SHARE Award: Shea Ili
- Defensive Player: Shea Ili
- Club MVP: Jo Lual-Acuil
- Vince Crivelli Club Person of the Year: Tom Lewis (Commercial Operations Assistant)

== See also ==
- 2021–22 NBL season
- Melbourne United
