= 2021–22 Perth Wildcats season =

- Head coach: (Canada) Scott Morrison
- Captain: (Australia) Jesse Wagstaff
- Arena: Perth Arena

NBL results
- Record: 16–12 (57.1%)
- Ladder: 5th
- Finals finish: Did not qualify
- Stats at NBL.com.au

Player records
- Points: (United States) Cotton 22.7
- Rebounds: (United States) Law 8.2
- Assists: (United States) Cotton 4.9
- All statistics correct as of 24 April 2022.

The 2021–22 NBL season was the 41st season for the Perth Wildcats in the NBL.

The 2022 season marks the first time in 35 years that the Perth Wildcats have not qualified for the finals, having last failed to do so in 1986.

== Roster ==
Note: Flags indicate national team eligibility at FIBA-sanctioned events. Players may hold other non-FIBA nationalities not displayed.

2021–22 Perth Wildcats roster
Players
Coaches

Pos.	No.	Nat.	Name	Ht.	Wt.	Age
F	1	(United States)	Law, Vic (I)	2.01 m (6 ft 7 in)	91 kg (201 lb)	30 – 19 December 1995
F	2	(Australia)	Purchase, Jack	2.06 m (6 ft 9 in)	95 kg (209 lb)	31 – 26 June 1995
G	3	(Australia)	White, Kevin	1.87 m (6 ft 2 in)	94 kg (207 lb)	39 – 7 April 1987
F/C	5	(Australia)	Hayes-Brown, Oliver (DP)	2.08 m (6 ft 10 in)	114 kg (251 lb)	26 – 28 April 2000
G	8	(Australia)	Norton, Mitch	1.86 m (6 ft 1 in)	91 kg (201 lb)	33 – 1 April 1993
G	9	(Australia)	Zunic, Kyle (DP)	1.88 m (6 ft 2 in)	91 kg (201 lb)	27 – 4 May 1999
G	11	(United States)	Cotton, Bryce (I)	1.82 m (6 ft 0 in)	75 kg (165 lb)	34 – 11 August 1992
G/F	12	(Australia)	Blanchfield, Todd	2.00 m (6 ft 7 in)	95 kg (209 lb)	34 – 7 November 1991
C	18	(Australia)	Hodgson, Matt	2.11 m (6 ft 11 in)	115 kg (254 lb)	35 – 2 August 1991
G	20	(United States)	Frazier II, Michael (I)	1.93 m (6 ft 4 in)	91 kg (201 lb)	32 – 8 March 1994
F/C	22	(South Sudan)	Majok, Majok	2.06 m (6 ft 9 in)	111 kg (245 lb)	33 – 10 December 1992
G	23	(Australia)	Travers, Luke	2.01 m (6 ft 7 in)	93 kg (205 lb)	25 – 3 September 2001
F	24	(Australia)	Wagstaff, Jesse (C)	2.03 m (6 ft 8 in)	103 kg (227 lb)	40 – 30 April 1986
F	25	(Australia)	Shervill, Corey (injured) (DP)	2.01 m (6 ft 7 in)	100 kg (220 lb)	28 – 19 March 1998
G	41	(Australia)	Clarke, Mitch (DP)	1.85 m (6 ft 1 in)		26 – 26 November 1999

Head coach

- (Canada) Scott Morrison

Assistant coach(es)

- (United States) Mike Kelly
- (Australia) Luke Brennan
- (Australia) Keegan Crawford

Strength & conditioning coach(es)

- (Australia) Josh Cavanagh

Legend

- (C) Team captain
- (DP) Development player
- (IN) Inactive
- (I) Import player
- (SRP) Special restricted player
- (NS) Next Star player
- Injured

- Roster
Updated: 11 January 2022

== Pre-season ==
=== Game log ===
2021 NBL Blitz game log
Total: 2–3 (Home: 2–1; Road: 0–2)
November: 2–3 (Home: 2–1; Road: 0–2)

Game	Date	Team	Score	High points	High rebounds	High assists	Location Attendance	Record
1	16 November	Adelaide	L 56–63	Law, Wagstaff (11)	Hodgson, Law (8)	Cotton, Wagstaff (3)	MyState Bank Arena not available	0–1
2	19 November	@ Brisbane	L 100–90	Bryce Cotton (22)	Vic Law (6)	Cotton, Law (5)	Ulverstone Sports & Leisure Centre not available	0–2
3	21 November	Cairns	W 96–87	Vic Law (28)	Vic Law (12)	Luke Travers (5)	Ulverstone Sports & Leisure Centre not available	1–2
4	24 November	Tasmania	W 98–68	Bryce Cotton (18)	Vic Law (9)	Bryce Cotton (6)	Ulverstone Sports & Leisure Centre not available	2–2
5	26 November	@ Adelaide	L 97–93	Vic Law (24)	Oliver Hayes-Brown (11)	Kyle Zunic (5)	Elphin Sports Centre not available	2–3

== Regular season ==
=== Ladder ===
Pos	2021–22 NBL season											
Pos	Team	Pld	W	L	PCT	Last 5	Streak	Home	Away	PF	PA	PP
1	Melbourne United	28	20	8	71.43%	4–1	L1	9–5	11–3	2455	2244	109.40%
2	Illawarra Hawks	28	19	9	67.86%	4–1	W2	8–6	11–3	2498	2345	106.52%
3	Sydney Kings	28	19	9	67.86%	3–2	L1	9–5	10–4	2397	2313	103.63%
4	Tasmania JackJumpers	28	17	11	60.71%	4–1	W4	8–6	9–5	2230	2220	100.45%
5	Perth Wildcats	28	16	12	57.14%	2–3	L2	7–7	9–5	2495	2377	104.96%
6	S.E. Melbourne Phoenix	28	15	13	53.57%	3–2	W2	7–7	8–6	2456	2424	101.32%
7	Adelaide 36ers	28	10	18	35.71%	3–2	W1	6–8	4–10	2283	2346	97.31%
8	Brisbane Bullets	28	10	18	35.71%	2–3	L2	6–8	4–10	2379	2500	95.16%
9	Cairns Taipans	28	9	19	32.14%	1–4	W1	5–9	4–10	2228	2408	92.52%
10	New Zealand Breakers	28	5	23	17.86%	0–5	L10	2–12	3–11	2234	2478	90.15%

Updated to match(es) played on 24 April 2022. Source: NBL.com.au

=== Ladder progression ===
- Numbers highlighted in green indicate that the team finished the round inside the top four.
- Numbers highlighted in blue indicates the team finished first on the ladder in that round.
- Numbers highlighted in red indicates the team finished last place on the ladder in that round.

2021–22 NBL season
Team	1	2	3	4	5	6	7	8	9	10	11	12	13	14	15	16	17	18	19	20	21
Adelaide 36ers	8	6	8	8	8	8	7	8	8	8	8	7	8	8	8	8	8	9	9	8	7
Brisbane Bullets	7	5	7	6	6	7	6	5	7	9	7	8	7	7	7	7	7	7	7	7	8
Cairns Taipans	9	7	4	4	5	5	5	6	9	7	9	10	9	9	10	9	9	8	8	9	9
Illawarra Hawks	3	2	3	3	3	3	3	4	4	5	4	5	4	4	5	4	4	3	3	3	2
Melbourne United	6	9	6	5	4	4	1	1	2	3	1	1	1	1	1	1	1	1	1	1	1
New Zealand Breakers	10	10	10	10	10	10	10	10	10	10	10	9	10	10	9	10	10	10	10	10	10
Perth Wildcats	2	3	1	1	1	1	2	2	3	1	2	3	3	3	2	2	3	4	4	4	5
S.E. Melbourne Phoenix	1	1	2	2	2	2	4	3	1	2	3	2	2	2	4	5	5	6	6	6	6
Sydney Kings	5	4	5	7	7	6	8	7	5	6	5	4	5	5	3	3	2	2	2	2	3
Tasmania JackJumpers	4	8	9	9	9	9	9	9	6	4	6	6	6	6	6	6	6	5	5	5	4

=== Game log ===
2021–22 game log
Total: 16–12 (Home: 7–7; Road: 9–5)
December: 5–1 (Home: 4–1; Road: 1–0)

Game	Date	Team	Score	High points	High rebounds	High assists	Location Attendance	Record
1	3 December	Adelaide	W 85–73	Vic Law (37)	Majok Majok (12)	Bryce Cotton (5)	RAC Arena; 11,950	1–0
2	5 December	Cairns	W 90–67	Bryce Cotton (31)	Luke Travers (13)	Bryce Cotton (5)	RAC Arena; 10,800	2–0
3	12 December	Brisbane	L 94–97 (2OT)	Vic Law (29)	Majok Majok (14)	Cotton, Travers (5)	RAC Arena; 11,295	2–1
4	17 December	Brisbane	W 83–70	Bryce Cotton (29)	Law, Travers (9)	Luke Travers (4)	RAC Arena; 11,745	3–1
5	19 December	Tasmania	W 101–83	Vic Law (32)	Vic Law (12)	Cotton, White (6)	RAC Arena; 13,615	4–1
6	31 December	@ Cairns	W 78–84	Bryce Cotton (29)	Majok Majok (9)	Bryce Cotton (6)	Cairns Convention Centre; 4,339	5–1

January: 2–2 (Home: 0–0; Road: 2–2)

Game	Date	Team	Score	High points	High rebounds	High assists	Location Attendance	Record
7	18 January	@ Adelaide	L 87–74	Vic Law (16)	Vic Law (14)	Michael Frazier II (4)	Adelaide Entertainment Centre; 4,758	5–2
8	22 January	@ Illawarra	W 78–94	Bryce Cotton (24)	Michael Frazier II (10)	Mitch Norton (6)	WIN Entertainment Centre; 2,278	6–2
9	27 January	@ Illawarra	W 80–94	Bryce Cotton (28)	Frazier II, Law (8)	Mitch Norton (6)	WIN Entertainment Centre; 2,240	7–2
10	30 January	@ Sydney	L 96–81	Cotton, Law (20)	Vic Law (9)	Bryce Cotton (4)	Qudos Bank Arena; 5,864	7–3

February: 2–3 (Home: 0–0; Road: 2–3)

Game	Date	Team	Score	High points	High rebounds	High assists	Location Attendance	Record
11	5 February	@ S.E. Melbourne	W 79–101	Luke Travers (24)	Michael Frazier II (9)	Bryce Cotton (6)	John Cain Arena; 3,727	8–3
12	12 February	@ Melbourne	L 93–87	Bryce Cotton (31)	Vic Law (10)	Cotton, Norton (4)	John Cain Arena; 6,401	8–4
13	19 February	@ Sydney	L 98–95	Bryce Cotton (33)	Hodgson, Majok, Norton, Travers (5)	Cotton, Norton (4)	Qudos Bank Arena; 7,143	8–5
14	26 February	@ S.E. Melbourne	L 86–80	Vic Law (22)	Vic Law (9)	Mitch Norton (7)	John Cain Arena; 3,606	8–6
15	28 February	@ Tasmania	W 78–89	Bryce Cotton (20)	Vic Law (13)	Bryce Cotton (5)	MyState Bank Arena; 4,738	9–6

March: 5–2 (Home: 1–2; Road: 4–0)

Game	Date	Team	Score	High points	High rebounds	High assists	Location Attendance	Record
16	6 March	@ Adelaide	W 73–92	Bryce Cotton (27)	Vic Law (10)	Bryce Cotton (7)	Adelaide Entertainment Centre; 4,157	10–6
17	10 March	@ Melbourne	W 87–97	Mitch Norton (26)	Vic Law (18)	Bryce Cotton (5)	John Cain Arena; 4,169	11–6
18	12 March	@ Brisbane	W 83–95	Vic Law (24)	Vic Law (8)	Vic Law (4)	Nissan Arena; 3,202	12–6
19	14 March	@ New Zealand	W 102–104 (OT)	Vic Law (39)	Cotton, Law (8)	Bryce Cotton (8)	MyState Bank Arena closed event	13–6
20	20 March	New Zealand	W 95–85	Vic Law (26)	Law, Majok (12)	Bryce Cotton (6)	RAC Arena; 6,927	14–6
21	24 March	Tasmania	L 83–85	Bryce Cotton (23)	Vic Law (10)	Cotton, Travers (5)	RAC Arena; 6,678	14–7
22	26 March	Sydney	L 80–102	Cotton, Travers (20)	Vic Law (10)	Kyle Zunic (3)	RAC Arena; 6,906	14–8

April: 2–4 (Home: 2–4; Road: 0–0)

Game	Date	Team	Score	High points	High rebounds	High assists	Location Attendance	Record
23	4 April	Melbourne	L 75–84	Bryce Cotton (18)	Matt Hodgson (11)	Cotton, Travers (4)	RAC Arena; 10,192	14–9
24	7 April	New Zealand	W 89–80	Vic Law (18)	Luke Travers (9)	Bryce Cotton (5)	RAC Arena; 10,270	15–9
25	14 April	Adelaide	L 70–82	Vic Law (20)	Matt Hodgson (6)	Bryce Cotton (5)	RAC Arena; 10,272	15–10
26	16 April	Cairns	W 106–87	Bryce Cotton (22)	Todd Blanchfield (7)	Bryce Cotton (10)	RAC Arena; 10,314	16–10
27	22 April	Illawarra	L 77–82	Bryce Cotton (25)	Majok Majok (10)	Mitch Norton (8)	RAC Arena; 10,251	16–11
28	24 April	S.E. Melbourne	L 100–102 (OT)	Bryce Cotton (28)	Matt Hodgson (10)	Bryce Cotton (8)	RAC Arena; 10,271	16–12

2021–22 season schedule

== Transactions ==
=== Re-signed ===
Player	Signed
Mitch Norton	1 July
Jesse Wagstaff	5 July
Majok Majok	6 July
Corey Shervill	7 July
Kevin White	18 August
Bryce Cotton	4 May

=== Additions ===
Player	Signed	Former team
Vic Law	27 August	Brisbane Bullets
Kyle Zunic	6 September	Winthrop Eagles
Jack Purchase	14 September	Adelaide 36ers
Michael Frazier II	15 October	Delaware Blue Coats
Matt Hodgson	15 October	Brisbane Bullets
Oliver Hayes-Brown	29 October	Dandenong Rangers
Mitch Clarke	2 December	Perry Lakes Hawks

=== Subtractions ===
Player	Reason left	New team
Clint Steindl	Free agent	Tasmania JackJumpers
Will Magnay	Free agent	Tasmania JackJumpers
Jarred Bairstow	Free agent	Tasmania JackJumpers
John Mooney	Free agent	Chiba Jets Funabashi
Luke Travers	NBA draft	N/A

== Awards ==
=== Club awards ===
- Members MVP: Bryce Cotton
- Coaches’ Award: Jack Purchase
- Players’ Player: Bryce Cotton
- Most Improved Player: Luke Travers
- Best Defensive Player: Mitch Norton
- Club MVP: Bryce Cotton

== See also ==
- 2021–22 NBL season
- Perth Wildcats
