= 2021–22 Tasmania JackJumpers season =

- Head coach: (United States) Scott Roth
- Captain: (Australia) Clint Steindl
- Arena: Derwent Entertainment Centre

NBL results
- Record: 17–11 (60.7%)
- Ladder: 4th
- Finals finish: Runners-up (lost to Kings 0–3)
- Stats at NBL.com.au

Player records
- Points: (United States) Adams 16.6
- Rebounds: (Australia) Magnay 5.5
- Assists: (United States) Magette 5.9
- All statistics correct as of 24 April 2022.

The 2021–22 NBL season was the 1st season for the Tasmania JackJumpers in the NBL.

== Roster ==
Note: Flags indicate national team eligibility at FIBA-sanctioned events. Players may hold other non-FIBA nationalities not displayed.

2021–22 Tasmania JackJumpers roster
Players
Coaches

Pos.	No.	Nat.	Name	Ht.	Wt.	Age
F	0	(Canada)	McIntosh, MiKyle (I)	2.01 m (6 ft 7 in)	109 kg (240 lb)	32 – 19 July 1994
G	1	(Australia)	Kenyon, Matt	1.96 m (6 ft 5 in)	91 kg (201 lb)	28 – 8 February 1998
G	2	(United States)	Magette, Josh (I)	1.85 m (6 ft 1 in)	73 kg (161 lb)	36 – 28 November 1989
G	7	(Australia)	Deans, Sejr (DP)	1.87 m (6 ft 2 in)	88 kg (194 lb)	23 – 29 January 2003
G	9	(Australia)	McVeigh, Jack	2.03 m (6 ft 8 in)	95 kg (209 lb)	30 – 27 June 1996
G	13	(Australia)	Macdonald, Sean (DP)	1.88 m (6 ft 2 in)	87 kg (192 lb)	26 – 21 April 2000
G	14	(United States)	Adams, Josh (I)	1.88 m (6 ft 2 in)	86 kg (190 lb)	32 – 16 November 1993
C	15	(Australia)	Perry, Jock (DP)	2.16 m (7 ft 1 in)	113 kg (249 lb)	27 – 20 May 1999
F	20	(Australia)	Krslovic, Fabijan	2.03 m (6 ft 8 in)	108 kg (238 lb)	31 – 23 June 1995
F	21	(Australia)	Bairstow, Jarred	2.01 m (6 ft 7 in)	104 kg (229 lb)	33 – 5 November 1992
C	22	(Australia)	Magnay, Will (injured)	2.08 m (6 ft 10 in)	106 kg (234 lb)	28 – 10 June 1998
G	30	(Australia)	McDaniel, Sam	1.98 m (6 ft 6 in)	95 kg (209 lb)	30 – 9 December 1995
G/F	35	(Australia)	Steindl, Clint (C)	2.00 m (6 ft 7 in)	91 kg (201 lb)	37 – 15 March 1989
G	97	(Australia)	Weeks, Jarrad	1.83 m (6 ft 0 in)	80 kg (176 lb)	37 – 11 July 1989

Head coach

- (United States) Scott Roth

Assistant coach(es)

- (Australia) Jacob Chance
- (Australia) Mark Radford
- (Australia) Jack Fleming

Team manager

- (Australia) Mark Chivers

Legend

- (C) Team captain
- (DP) Development player
- (IN) Inactive
- (I) Import player
- (SRP) Special restricted player
- (NS) Next Star player
- Injured

- Roster
Updated: 11 March 2022

== Pre-season ==
=== Game log ===
2021 NBL Blitz game log
Total: 2–3 (home: 1–1; road: 1–2)
November: 2–3 (Home: 1–1; Road: 1–2)

Game	Date	Team	Score	High points	High rebounds	High assists	Location Attendance	Record
1	14 November	Brisbane	L 79–89	Josh Adams (18)	McDaniel, McVeigh (6)	Josh Magette (5)	MyState Bank Arena; 4,500	0–1
2	16 November	@ Cairns	W 66–81	Josh Adams (15)	Josh Magette (6)	Josh Magette (4)	MyState Bank Arena not available	1–1
3	21 November	@ Adelaide	L 82–80	Clint Steindl (17)	McDaniel, Magnay (4)	Josh Magette (8)	Ulverstone Sports & Leisure Centre not available	1–2
4	24 November	@ Perth	L 98–68	Josh Adams (17)	Will Magnay (5)	Josh Magette (7)	Ulverstone Sports & Leisure Centre not available	1–3
5	26 November	Cairns	W 83–68	Josh Magette (26)	Will Magnay (9)	Josh Magette (6)	Elphin Sports Centre not available	2–3

== Regular season ==
=== Ladder ===
Pos	2021–22 NBL season											
Pos	Team	Pld	W	L	PCT	Last 5	Streak	Home	Away	PF	PA	PP
1	Melbourne United	28	20	8	71.43%	4–1	L1	9–5	11–3	2455	2244	109.40%
2	Illawarra Hawks	28	19	9	67.86%	4–1	W2	8–6	11–3	2498	2345	106.52%
3	Sydney Kings	28	19	9	67.86%	3–2	L1	9–5	10–4	2397	2313	103.63%
4	Tasmania JackJumpers	28	17	11	60.71%	4–1	W4	8–6	9–5	2230	2220	100.45%
5	Perth Wildcats	28	16	12	57.14%	2–3	L2	7–7	9–5	2495	2377	104.96%
6	S.E. Melbourne Phoenix	28	15	13	53.57%	3–2	W2	7–7	8–6	2456	2424	101.32%
7	Adelaide 36ers	28	10	18	35.71%	3–2	W1	6–8	4–10	2283	2346	97.31%
8	Brisbane Bullets	28	10	18	35.71%	2–3	L2	6–8	4–10	2379	2500	95.16%
9	Cairns Taipans	28	9	19	32.14%	1–4	W1	5–9	4–10	2228	2408	92.52%
10	New Zealand Breakers	28	5	23	17.86%	0–5	L10	2–12	3–11	2234	2478	90.15%

Updated to match(es) played on 24 April 2022. Source: NBL.com.au

=== Ladder progression ===
- Numbers highlighted in green indicate that the team finished the round inside the top four.
- Numbers highlighted in blue indicates the team finished first on the ladder in that round.
- Numbers highlighted in red indicates the team finished last place on the ladder in that round.

2021–22 NBL season
Team	1	2	3	4	5	6	7	8	9	10	11	12	13	14	15	16	17	18	19	20	21
Adelaide 36ers	8	6	8	8	8	8	7	8	8	8	8	7	8	8	8	8	8	9	9	8	7
Brisbane Bullets	7	5	7	6	6	7	6	5	7	9	7	8	7	7	7	7	7	7	7	7	8
Cairns Taipans	9	7	4	4	5	5	5	6	9	7	9	10	9	9	10	9	9	8	8	9	9
Illawarra Hawks	3	2	3	3	3	3	3	4	4	5	4	5	4	4	5	4	4	3	3	3	2
Melbourne United	6	9	6	5	4	4	1	1	2	3	1	1	1	1	1	1	1	1	1	1	1
New Zealand Breakers	10	10	10	10	10	10	10	10	10	10	10	9	10	10	9	10	10	10	10	10	10
Perth Wildcats	2	3	1	1	1	1	2	2	3	1	2	3	3	3	2	2	3	4	4	4	5
S.E. Melbourne Phoenix	1	1	2	2	2	2	4	3	1	2	3	2	2	2	4	5	5	6	6	6	6
Sydney Kings	5	4	5	7	7	6	8	7	5	6	5	4	5	5	3	3	2	2	2	2	3
Tasmania JackJumpers	4	8	9	9	9	9	9	9	6	4	6	6	6	6	6	6	6	5	5	5	4

=== Game log ===
2021–22 game log
Total: 17–11 (home: 8–6; road: 9–5)
December: 2–4 (Home: 2–1; Road: 0–3)

Game	Date	Team	Score	High points	High rebounds	High assists	Location Attendance	Record
1	3 December	Brisbane	W 83–74 (OT)	Josh Adams (20)	Will Magnay (10)	Josh Magette (6)	MyState Bank Arena; 4,738	1–0
2	9 December	Adelaide	L 80–83	Clint Steindl (22)	Jack McVeigh (6)	Josh Magette (8)	MyState Bank Arena; 4,738	1–1
3	11 December	@ Cairns	L 69–62	Josh Magette (19)	Sam McDaniel (8)	Josh Magette (5)	Cairns Convention Centre; 4,015	1–2
4	19 December	@ Perth	L 101–83	Josh Magette (17)	Josh Magette (7)	Josh Magette (6)	RAC Arena; 13,615	1–3
5	22 December	@ Sydney	L 83–71	Clint Steindl (15)	Krslovic, Magnay (7)	Krslovic, Magette (3)	Qudos Bank Arena; 4,612	1–4
6	26 December	New Zealand	W 84–75	Josh Adams (21)	McDaniel, McVeigh (6)	Josh Magette (7)	MyState Bank Arena; 4,623	2–4

January: 2–2 (Home: 1–2; Road: 1–0)

Game	Date	Team	Score	High points	High rebounds	High assists	Location Attendance	Record
7	1 January	Melbourne	L 72–76	Josh Adams (23)	MiKyle McIntosh (6)	Bairstow, Magette, Weeks (2)	MyState Bank Arena; 4,685	2–5
8	23 January	S.E. Melbourne	L 63–76	Clint Steindl (16)	Will Magnay (8)	Josh Magette (9)	MyState Bank Arena; 4,235	2–6
9	28 January	Adelaide	W 76–71	Josh Adams (24)	Will Magnay (9)	Josh Magette (7)	MyState Bank Arena; 4,632	3–6
10	30 January	@ New Zealand	W 59–83	Josh Magette (22)	Matt Kenyon (8)	Josh Magette (8)	MyState Bank Arena; 1,477	4–6

February: 3–3 (Home: 1–1; Road: 2–2)

Game	Date	Team	Score	High points	High rebounds	High assists	Location Attendance	Record
11	4 February	Sydney	W 77–70	Josh Magette (18)	Magnay, McVeigh (7)	Josh Adams (4)	MyState Bank Arena; 4,643	5–6
12	6 February	@ Melbourne	W 85–94	Jack McVeigh (17)	Sam McDaniel (6)	Josh Magette (6)	John Cain Arena; 8,499	6–6
13	13 February	@ S.E. Melbourne	L 83–71	Josh Adams (23)	Jack McVeigh (6)	Josh Magette (5)	John Cain Arena; 3,875	6–7
14	20 February	@ Illawarra	W 86–96	Josh Adams (28)	Jack McVeigh (7)	Josh Magette (5)	WIN Entertainment Centre; 2,325	7–7
15	26 February	@ Brisbane	L 94–86	McIntosh, McVeigh (21)	Clint Steindl (7)	Josh Magette (8)	Nissan Arena; 2,683	7–8
16	28 February	Perth	L 78–89	Jack McVeigh (16)	Krslovic, Magette, McVeigh (5)	Josh Magette (6)	MyState Bank Arena; 4,738	7–9

March: 5–1 (Home: 2–1; Road: 3–0)

Game	Date	Team	Score	High points	High rebounds	High assists	Location Attendance	Record
17	5 March	New Zealand	W 66–62	MiKyle McIntosh (21)	Kenyon, McDaniel (7)	Josh Magette (7)	Silverdome; 3,532	8–9
18	11 March	@ Cairns	69–85	Josh Adams (20)	Adams, Bairstow, Kenyon, Magette (5)	Magette, Weeks (3)	Cairns Convention Centre; 3,300	9–9
19	13 March	Illawarra	W 81–77	Clint Steindl (20)	Matt Kenyon (10)	Josh Magette (7)	MyState Bank Arena; 4,738	10–9
20	19 March	Illawarra	L 65–91	Josh Adams (21)	Jack McVeigh (7)	Josh Magette (6)	Silverdome; 3,532	10–10
21	24 March	@ Perth	W 83–85	Jack McVeigh (19)	Jack McVeigh (7)	Adams, Magette (5)	RAC Arena; 6,678	11–10
22	26 March	@ Brisbane	W 82–84	Magette, McVeigh (15)	Sam McDaniel (7)	Josh Magette (8)	Nissan Arena; 2,489	12–10

April: 5–1 (Home: 2–1; Road: 3–0)

Game	Date	Team	Score	High points	High rebounds	High assists	Location Attendance	Record
23	1 April	@ Adelaide	W 72–80	Josh Adams (31)	Fabijan Krslovic (8)	Josh Magette (7)	Adelaide Entertainment Centre; 3,407	13–10
24	3 April	Sydney	L 83–103	Josh Adams (18)	Sam McDaniel (7)	Sean Macdonald (4)	MyState Bank Arena; 4,738	13–11
25	8 April	Cairns	W 87–80	Jack McVeigh (16)	Jack McVeigh (7)	Josh Magette (7)	MyState Bank Arena; 4,738	14–11
26	15 April	@ New Zealand	W 86–88	Josh Adams (23)	Kenyon, Magette, McIntosh, McVeigh (6)	Josh Magette (8)	MyState Bank Arena closed event	15–11
27	17 April	@ S.E. Melbourne	W 80–84	Jack McVeigh (26)	Jack McVeigh (9)	Fabijan Krslovic (6)	John Cain Arena; 3,056	16–11
28	23 April	Melbourne	W 83–61	MiKyle McIntosh (20)	Jack McVeigh (10)	Josh Magette (6)	MyState Bank Arena; 4,865	17–11

2021–22 season schedule

== Postseason ==
2022 finals game log
Total: 2–4 (home: 1–1; road: 1–3)
Semifinals: 2–1 (Home: 1–0; Road: 1–1)

Game	Date	Team	Score	High points	High rebounds	High assists	Location Attendance	Series
1	28 April	@ Melbourne	L 74–63	Josh Adams (16)	Adams, Krslovic (5)	Josh Magette (6)	John Cain Arena; 5,268	0–1
2	30 April	Melbourne	W 79–72	Jack McVeigh (15)	Magette, McDaniel (5)	Jarred Bairstow (4)	MyStateBank Arena; 4,865	1–1
3	2 May	@ Melbourne	W 73–76	Josh Adams (30)	MiKyle McIntosh (9)	Josh Magette (7)	John Cain Arena; 4,816	2–1

NBL Finals: 0–3 (Home: 0–1; Road: 0–2)

Game	Date	Team	Score	High points	High rebounds	High assists	Location Attendance	Record
4	6 May	@ Sydney	L 95–78	McIntosh, McVeigh (14)	Josh Adams (8)	Josh Magette (10)	Qudos Bank Arena; 12,765	2–2
5	8 May	Sydney	L 86–90	Josh Adams (36)	Fabijan Krslovic (10)	Josh Magette (5)	MyStateBank Arena; 4,738	2–3
6	11 May	@ Sydney	L 97–88	Josh Adams (27)	Josh Magette (9)	Josh Magette (7)	Qudos Bank Arena; 16,149	2–4

2022 finals schedule

== Transactions ==
=== Re-signed ===
Player	Signed
Matt Kenyon	7 April
Will Magnay	21 April

=== Additions ===
Player	Signed	Former team
Sejr Deans	14 April	North-West Tasmania Thunder
Sam McDaniel	1 July	Melbourne United
Clint Steindl	5 July	Perth Wildcats
Jack McVeigh	6 July	Adelaide 36ers
Jarred Bairstow	7 July	Perth Wildcats
Will Magnay	12 July	Perth Wildcats
Fabijan Krslovic	14 July	Cairns Taipans
Jarrad Weeks	14 July	Sydney Kings
Josh Adams	20 July	Virtus Bologna
Josh Magette	28 July	Darüşşafaka Tekfen
Nikita Mikhailovskii	29 July	Avtodor Saratov
MiKyle McIntosh	12 August	ESSM Le Portel
Matt Kenyon	17 August	Ballarat Miners
Jock Perry	17 August	Ballarat Miners
Sean Macdonald	17 August	Dandenong Rangers

=== Subtractions ===
Player	Reason left	New team
Nikita Mikhailovskii	Mutual release	N/A

== Awards ==
=== Club awards ===
- Coaches Award: Fabijan Krslovic
- Fan Favourite: Jack McVeigh
- Defensive Player: Matt Kenyon
- Players Award: Jarrad Weeks
- Club MVP: Josh Adams
- Spirit of the JackJumpers: Jack Soward (Operations Coordinator)

== See also ==
- 2021–22 NBL season
- Tasmania JackJumpers
