= 2021–22 S.E. Melbourne Phoenix season =

- Head coach: (Australia) Simon Mitchell
- Captain: (Australia) Kyle Adnam
- Arena: John Cain Arena

NBL results
- Record: 15–13 (53.6%)
- Ladder: 6th
- Finals finish: Did not qualify
- Stats at NBL.com.au

Player records
- Points: (Australia) Creek 20.5
- Rebounds: (Australia) Broekhoff 6.7
- Assists: (United States) Munford 4.3
- All statistics correct as of 24 April 2022.

The 2021–22 NBL season was the 3rd season for the South East Melbourne Phoenix in the NBL.

== Roster ==
Note: Flags indicate national team eligibility at FIBA-sanctioned events. Players may hold other non-FIBA nationalities not displayed.

2021–22 South East Melbourne Phoenix roster
Players
Coaches

Pos.	No.	Nat.	Name	Ht.	Wt.	Age
G	1	(Australia)	Gibson, Adam	1.88 m (6 ft 2 in)	95 kg (209 lb)	39 – 30 October 1986
G	3	(Australia)	Gliddon, Cameron	1.97 m (6 ft 6 in)	94 kg (207 lb)	37 – 16 August 1989
G	4	(Australia)	Adnam, Kyle (C)	1.86 m (6 ft 1 in)	83 kg (183 lb)	32 – 18 November 1993
G	5	(United States)	Munford, Xavier (I)	1.93 m (6 ft 4 in)	78 kg (172 lb)	34 – 1 June 1992
G/F	7	(New Zealand)	Te Rangi, Reuben	1.98 m (6 ft 6 in)	105 kg (231 lb)	32 – 14 October 1994
G	8	(New Zealand)	Le'afa, Izayah	1.88 m (6 ft 2 in)	90 kg (198 lb)	29 – 7 November 1996
G	9	(Australia)	Sapwell, Koen (DP)	1.93 m (6 ft 4 in)
F	13	(United States)	Ashley, Brandon (I)	2.06 m (6 ft 9 in)	104 kg (229 lb)	32 – 15 July 1994
F	14	(New Zealand)	Smith-Milner, Tohi	2.05 m (6 ft 9 in)	112 kg (247 lb)	31 – 6 October 1995
C	22	(Australia)	Pineau, Dane	2.06 m (6 ft 9 in)	102 kg (225 lb)	32 – 2 August 1994
F	25	(United States)	Taylor Jr., Steve (IN)	2.06 m (6 ft 9 in)	109 kg (240 lb)	33 – 15 February 1993
C	26	(China)	Zhou Qi (SRP)	2.16 m (7 ft 1 in)	96 kg (212 lb)	30 – 16 January 1996
G	30	(Australia)	Foxwell, Owen (DP)	1.87 m (6 ft 2 in)	78 kg (172 lb)	23 – 17 August 2003
F/C	34	(Australia)	Forsyth, Tristan (DP)	2.08 m (6 ft 10 in)	107 kg (236 lb)	28 – 19 January 1998
G	40	(Australia)	Barker, Lachlan	1.88 m (6 ft 2 in)	83 kg (183 lb)	30 – 14 July 1996
G/F	45	(Australia)	Broekhoff, Ryan	1.98 m (6 ft 6 in)	98 kg (216 lb)	36 – 23 August 1990
G/F	55	(Australia)	Creek, Mitch	1.96 m (6 ft 5 in)	98 kg (216 lb)	34 – 27 April 1992

Head coach

- (Australia) Simon Mitchell

Assistant coach(es)

- (New Zealand) Judd Flavell
- (Australia) Luke Kendall

Legend

- (C) Team captain
- (DP) Development player
- (IN) Inactive
- (I) Import player
- (SRP) Special restricted player
- (NS) Next Star player
- Injured

- Roster
Updated: 10 February 2022

== Pre-season ==
=== Game log ===
2021 NBL Blitz game log
Total: 2–2 (Home: 1–1; Road: 1–1)
November: 2–2 (Home: 1–1; Road: 1–1)

Game	Date	Team	Score	High points	High rebounds	High assists	Location Attendance	Record
1	13 November	@ Sydney	W 75–81	Adnam, Creek (17)	Ryan Broekhoff (9)	Izayah Le'afa (4)	Melbourne Sports and Aquatic Centre closed event	1–0
2	15 November	Illawarra	L 112–116 (OT)	Reuben Te Rangi (18)	Zhou Qi (12)	Kyle Adnam (12)	Melbourne Sports and Aquatic Centre closed event	1–1
3	20 November	@ New Zealand	L 92–90	Kyle Adnam (21)	Zhou Qi (9)	Xavier Munford (4)	Melbourne Sports and Aquatic Centre closed event	1–2
4	28 November	Melbourne	W 89–87	Ryan Broekhoff (21)	Ryan Broekhoff (7)	Le'Afa, Munford (4)	Melbourne Sports Centre closed event	2–2

== Regular season ==
=== Ladder ===
Pos	2021–22 NBL season											
Pos	Team	Pld	W	L	PCT	Last 5	Streak	Home	Away	PF	PA	PP
1	Melbourne United	28	20	8	71.43%	4–1	L1	9–5	11–3	2455	2244	109.40%
2	Illawarra Hawks	28	19	9	67.86%	4–1	W2	8–6	11–3	2498	2345	106.52%
3	Sydney Kings	28	19	9	67.86%	3–2	L1	9–5	10–4	2397	2313	103.63%
4	Tasmania JackJumpers	28	17	11	60.71%	4–1	W4	8–6	9–5	2230	2220	100.45%
5	Perth Wildcats	28	16	12	57.14%	2–3	L2	7–7	9–5	2495	2377	104.96%
6	S.E. Melbourne Phoenix	28	15	13	53.57%	3–2	W2	7–7	8–6	2456	2424	101.32%
7	Adelaide 36ers	28	10	18	35.71%	3–2	W1	6–8	4–10	2283	2346	97.31%
8	Brisbane Bullets	28	10	18	35.71%	2–3	L2	6–8	4–10	2379	2500	95.16%
9	Cairns Taipans	28	9	19	32.14%	1–4	W1	5–9	4–10	2228	2408	92.52%
10	New Zealand Breakers	28	5	23	17.86%	0–5	L10	2–12	3–11	2234	2478	90.15%

Updated to match(es) played on 24 April 2022. Source: NBL.com.au

=== Ladder progression ===
- Numbers highlighted in green indicate that the team finished the round inside the top four.
- Numbers highlighted in blue indicates the team finished first on the ladder in that round.
- Numbers highlighted in red indicates the team finished last place on the ladder in that round.

2021–22 NBL season
Team	1	2	3	4	5	6	7	8	9	10	11	12	13	14	15	16	17	18	19	20	21
Adelaide 36ers	8	6	8	8	8	8	7	8	8	8	8	7	8	8	8	8	8	9	9	8	7
Brisbane Bullets	7	5	7	6	6	7	6	5	7	9	7	8	7	7	7	7	7	7	7	7	8
Cairns Taipans	9	7	4	4	5	5	5	6	9	7	9	10	9	9	10	9	9	8	8	9	9
Illawarra Hawks	3	2	3	3	3	3	3	4	4	5	4	5	4	4	5	4	4	3	3	3	2
Melbourne United	6	9	6	5	4	4	1	1	2	3	1	1	1	1	1	1	1	1	1	1	1
New Zealand Breakers	10	10	10	10	10	10	10	10	10	10	10	9	10	10	9	10	10	10	10	10	10
Perth Wildcats	2	3	1	1	1	1	2	2	3	1	2	3	3	3	2	2	3	4	4	4	5
S.E. Melbourne Phoenix	1	1	2	2	2	2	4	3	1	2	3	2	2	2	4	5	5	6	6	6	6
Sydney Kings	5	4	5	7	7	6	8	7	5	6	5	4	5	5	3	3	2	2	2	2	3
Tasmania JackJumpers	4	8	9	9	9	9	9	9	6	4	6	6	6	6	6	6	6	5	5	5	4

=== Game log ===
2021–22 game log
Total: 15–13 (Home: 7–7; Road: 8–6)
December: 3–1 (Home: 2–0; Road: 1–1)

Game	Date	Team	Score	High points	High rebounds	High assists	Location Attendance	Record
1	4 December	New Zealand	W 89–65	Xavier Munford (27)	Munford, Pineau (7)	Xavier Munford (5)	John Cain Arena; 3,453	1–0
2	10 December	New Zealand	W 95–88	Mitch Creek (36)	Cameron Gliddon (6)	Xavier Munford (6)	John Cain Arena; 3,752	2–0
3	12 December	@ Melbourne	W 86–94	Zhou Qi (22)	Zhou Qi (10)	Creek, Le'afa (5)	John Cain Arena; 6,361	3–0
4	18 December	@ Sydney	L 84–73	Mitch Creek (22)	Zhou Qi (13)	Izayah Le'afa (4)	Qudos Bank Arena; 6,379	3–1

January: 3–1 (Home: 1–0; Road: 2–1)

Game	Date	Team	Score	High points	High rebounds	High assists	Location Attendance	Record
5	15 January	@ Brisbane	L 100–84	Mitch Creek (19)	Mitch Creek (8)	Xavier Munford (7)	Nissan Arena; 2,389	3–2
6	23 January	@ Tasmania	W 63–76	Mitch Creek (21)	Ashley, Broekhoff (11)	Kyle Adnam (5)	MyState Bank Arena; 4,235	4–2
7	25 January	Cairns	W 87–77	Mitch Creek (26)	Broekhoff, Creek (8)	Xavier Munford (4)	Gippsland Regional Indoor Sports Stadium; 2,634	5–2
8	29 January	@ Brisbane	W 73–88	Mitch Creek (22)	Ashley, Broekhoff (7)	Xavier Munford (5)	Nissan Arena; 2,552	6–2

February: 4–3 (Home: 3–2; Road: 1–1)

Game	Date	Team	Score	High points	High rebounds	High assists	Location Attendance	Record
9	5 February	Perth	L 79–101	Xavier Munford (18)	Ashley, Creek (9)	Ashley, Creek, Munford (3)	John Cain Arena; 3,727	6–3
10	7 February	@ Illawarra	W 87–88	Xavier Munford (24)	Ryan Broekhoff (16)	Xavier Munford (5)	WIN Entertainment Centre; 2,040	7–3
11	10 February	Sydney	L 87–92	Ryan Broekhoff (25)	Zhou Qi (10)	Izayah Le'afa (6)	John Cain Arena; 2,133	7–4
12	13 February	Tasmania	W 83–71	Ryan Broekhoff (18)	Ryan Broekhoff (8)	Kyle Adnam (5)	John Cain Arena; 3,875	8–4
13	17 February	@ Melbourne	L 94–87	Mitch Creek (23)	Zhou Qi (9)	Xavier Munford (5)	John Cain Arena; 5,012	8–5
14	19 February	Brisbane	W 98–94	Cameron Gliddon (20)	Ryan Broekhoff (8)	Kyle Adnam (5)	John Cain Arena; 3,252	9–5
15	26 February	Perth	W 86–80	Kyle Adnam (24)	Ryan Broekhoff (11)	Kyle Adnam (6)	John Cain Arena; 3,606	10–5

March: 2–5 (Home: 0–3; Road: 2–2)

Game	Date	Team	Score	High points	High rebounds	High assists	Location Attendance	Record
16	4 March	@ Adelaide	W 76–83	Mitch Creek (29)	Creek, Zhou Qi (7)	Mitch Creek (5)	Adelaide Entertainment Centre; 4,775	11–5
17	6 March	Illawarra	L 77–83	Mitch Creek (18)	Broekhoff, Munford, Zhou Qi (7)	Xavier Munford (6)	John Cain Arena; 2,989	11–6
18	13 March	Melbourne	L 90–98	Mitch Creek (27)	Zhou Qi (12)	Mitch Creek (5)	John Cain Arena; 8,319	11–7
19	17 March	@ Illawarra	L 103–97	Zhou Qi (25)	Zhou Qi (8)	Kyle Adnam (6)	WIN Entertainment Centre; 2,324	11–8
20	19 March	Sydney	L 89–91	Xavier Munford (26)	Zhou Qi (8)	Adnam, Munford (5)	John Cain Arena; 2,717	11–9
21	25 March	@ Cairns	W 74–86	Brandon Ashley (25)	Mitch Creek (8)	Xavier Munford (4)	Cairns Convention Centre; 3,044	12–9
22	27 March	@ Adelaide	L 100–92	Mitch Creek (27)	Mitch Creek (12)	Xavier Munford (3)	Adelaide Entertainment Centre; 3,765	12–10

April: 3–3 (Home: 1–2; Road: 2–1)

Game	Date	Team	Score	High points	High rebounds	High assists	Location Attendance	Record
23	2 April	@ Cairns	L 90–85	Mitch Creek (21)	Xavier Munford (7)	Mitch Creek (4)	Cairns Convention Centre; 3,206	12–11
24	7 April	Melbourne	L 88–90	Mitch Creek (20)	Zhou Qi (7)	Izayah Le'afa (6)	John Cain Arena; 4,167	12–12
25	10 April	@ New Zealand	W 89–99	Xavier Munford (25)	Mitch Creek (8)	Xavier Munford (8)	Bendigo Stadium not available	13–12
26	17 April	Tasmania	L 80–84	Mitch Creek (27)	Mitch Creek (7)	Xavier Munford (5)	John Cain Arena; 3,056	13–13
27	22 April	Adelaide	W 94–91	Cameron Gliddon (24)	Brandon Ashley (11)	Xavier Munford (7)	John Cain Arena; 4,673	14–13
28	24 April	@ Perth	W 100–102 (OT)	Xavier Munford (24)	Dane Pineau (8)	Xavier Munford (10)	RAC Arena; 10,271	15–13

2021–22 season schedule

== Transactions ==
=== Re-signed ===
Player	Signed
Mitch Creek	18 June
Kyle Adnam	22 June
Izayah Le'afa	24 June
Ryan Broekhoff	28 June
Tristan Forsyth	20 October
Adam Gibson	10 February
Reuben Te Rangi	24 March

=== Additions ===
Player	Signed	Former team
Zach Hankins	28 July	Maccabi Rishon LeZion
Tohi Smith-Milner	13 August	Wellington Saints
Xavier Munford	1 September	Bursaspor Basketbol
Zhou Qi	8 September	Xinjiang Flying Tigers
Owen Foxwell	18 November	Bulleen Boomers
Devin Thomas	19 November	BC Kalev
Koen Sapwell	3 December	Hobart Chargers
Brandon Ashley	11 January	Fortitudo Bologna
Steve Taylor Jr.	14 January	Al-Ahli Jeddah
Lachlan Barker	25 January	Frankston Blues

=== Subtractions ===
Player	Reason left	New team
Yanni Wetzell	Free agent	New Zealand Breakers
Keifer Sykes	Free agent	Indiana Pacers
Devondrick Walker	Free agent	VEF Rīga
Zach Hankins	Released	N/A
Devin Thomas	Released	N/A

== Awards ==
=== Club awards ===
- Club MVP: Mitch Creek

== See also ==
- 2021–22 NBL season
- South East Melbourne Phoenix
