= 2021–22 Illawarra Hawks season =

Australian basketball club season

- Head coach: (United States) Brian Goorjian
- Captain: (Australia) Andrew Ogilvy
- Arena: Wollongong Entertainment Centre

NBL results
- Record: 19–9 (67.9%)
- Ladder: 2nd
- Finals finish: Semifinalist (lost to Kings 0–2)
- Stats at NBL.com.au

Player records
- Points: (United States) Harvey 16.1
- Rebounds: (Australia) S.Froling 7.5
- Assists: (Canada) Rathan-Mayes 4.2
- All statistics correct as of 24 April 2022.

The 2021–22 Illawarra Hawks season was the 44th season of the franchise in the National Basketball League (NBL).

== Roster ==
Note: Flags indicate national team eligibility at FIBA-sanctioned events. Players may hold other non-FIBA nationalities not displayed.

2021–22 Illawarra Hawks roster
Players
Coaches

Pos.	No.	Nat.	Name	Ht.	Wt.	Age
G	0	(United States)	Cleveland, Antonius (I)	1.96 m (6 ft 5 in)	88 kg (194 lb)	32 – 2 February 1994
G	1	(United States)	Harvey, Tyler (I)	1.93 m (6 ft 4 in)	84 kg (185 lb)	33 – 17 July 1993
G	2	(Australia)	White, Isaac	1.88 m (6 ft 2 in)	82 kg (181 lb)	28 – 22 June 1998
G	3	(Australia)	Naar, Emmett	1.85 m (6 ft 1 in)	88 kg (194 lb)	32 – 3 July 1994
C	6	(Australia)	Ogilvy, Andrew (C)	2.11 m (6 ft 11 in)	115 kg (254 lb)	38 – 17 June 1988
G	7	(Australia)	Dent, Lachlan (DP)	1.83 m (6 ft 0 in)		26 – 1 February 2000
G	8	(Canada)	Rathan-Mayes, Xavier (I)	1.93 m (6 ft 4 in)	91 kg (201 lb)	32 – 29 April 1994
G	10	(United States)	Jessup, Justinian (NS)	2.01 m (6 ft 7 in)	92 kg (203 lb)	28 – 23 May 1998
G/F	11	(Australia)	Grida, Daniel (injured)	1.97 m (6 ft 6 in)	93 kg (205 lb)	28 – 26 April 1998
F/C	13	(Australia)	Froling, Sam	2.13 m (7 ft 0 in)	109 kg (240 lb)	26 – 10 February 2000
G	15	(Australia)	Mudronja, Alex	1.96 m (6 ft 5 in)	88 kg (194 lb)	27 – 3 September 1999
F	22	(Australia)	Coenraad, Tim	1.99 m (6 ft 6 in)	97 kg (214 lb)	41 – 5 June 1985
F/C	26	(Australia)	Reath, Duop	2.11 m (6 ft 11 in)	111 kg (245 lb)	30 – 26 June 1996
C	31	(Australia)	Froling, Harry	2.11 m (6 ft 11 in)	120 kg (265 lb)	28 – 20 April 1998
F	47	(Australia)	Gak, Akoldah	2.11 m (6 ft 11 in)	91 kg (201 lb)	24 – 12 July 2002

Head coach

- (United States) Brian Goorjian

Assistant coach(es)

- (Australia) Jacob Jackomas
- (Australia) Shaun Roger

Legend

- (C) Team captain
- (DP) Development player
- (IN) Inactive
- (I) Import player
- (SRP) Special restricted player
- (NS) Next Star player
- Injured

- Roster
Updated: 15 November 2021

== Pre-season ==
=== Game log ===
2021 NBL Blitz game log
Total: 2–0 (home: 0–0; road: 2–0)
November: 2–0 (Home: 0–0; Road: 2–0)

Game	Date	Team	Score	High points	High rebounds	High assists	Location Attendance	Record
1	15 November	@ South East Melbourne	W 112–116 (OT)	Justinian Jessup (27)	Cleveland, Coenraad, H. Froling, S. Froling, Jessup (5)	Xavier Rathan-Mayes (7)	Melbourne Sports and Aquatic Centre closed event	1–0
2	20 November	@ Melbourne	W 90–97	Antonius Cleveland (21)	Duop Reath (6)	Harvey, Rathan-Mayes (3)	Melbourne Sports and Aquatic Centre closed event	2–0

Cancelled

Game	Date	Team	Score	High points	High rebounds	High assists	Location Attendance	Record
1	25 November	New Zealand	Cancelled					
2	27 November	Sydney	Cancelled					

== Regular season ==
=== Ladder ===
Pos	2021–22 NBL season											
Pos	Team	Pld	W	L	PCT	Last 5	Streak	Home	Away	PF	PA	PP
1	Melbourne United	28	20	8	71.43%	4–1	L1	9–5	11–3	2455	2244	109.40%
2	Illawarra Hawks	28	19	9	67.86%	4–1	W2	8–6	11–3	2498	2345	106.52%
3	Sydney Kings	28	19	9	67.86%	3–2	L1	9–5	10–4	2397	2313	103.63%
4	Tasmania JackJumpers	28	17	11	60.71%	4–1	W4	8–6	9–5	2230	2220	100.45%
5	Perth Wildcats	28	16	12	57.14%	2–3	L2	7–7	9–5	2495	2377	104.96%
6	S.E. Melbourne Phoenix	28	15	13	53.57%	3–2	W2	7–7	8–6	2456	2424	101.32%
7	Adelaide 36ers	28	10	18	35.71%	3–2	W1	6–8	4–10	2283	2346	97.31%
8	Brisbane Bullets	28	10	18	35.71%	2–3	L2	6–8	4–10	2379	2500	95.16%
9	Cairns Taipans	28	9	19	32.14%	1–4	W1	5–9	4–10	2228	2408	92.52%
10	New Zealand Breakers	28	5	23	17.86%	0–5	L10	2–12	3–11	2234	2478	90.15%

Updated to match(es) played on 24 April 2022. Source: NBL.com.au

=== Ladder progression ===
- Numbers highlighted in green indicate that the team finished the round inside the top four.
- Numbers highlighted in blue indicates the team finished first on the ladder in that round.
- Numbers highlighted in red indicates the team finished last place on the ladder in that round.

2021–22 NBL season
Team	1	2	3	4	5	6	7	8	9	10	11	12	13	14	15	16	17	18	19	20	21
Adelaide 36ers	8	6	8	8	8	8	7	8	8	8	8	7	8	8	8	8	8	9	9	8	7
Brisbane Bullets	7	5	7	6	6	7	6	5	7	9	7	8	7	7	7	7	7	7	7	7	8
Cairns Taipans	9	7	4	4	5	5	5	6	9	7	9	10	9	9	10	9	9	8	8	9	9
Illawarra Hawks	3	2	3	3	3	3	3	4	4	5	4	5	4	4	5	4	4	3	3	3	2
Melbourne United	6	9	6	5	4	4	1	1	2	3	1	1	1	1	1	1	1	1	1	1	1
New Zealand Breakers	10	10	10	10	10	10	10	10	10	10	10	9	10	10	9	10	10	10	10	10	10
Perth Wildcats	2	3	1	1	1	1	2	2	3	1	2	3	3	3	2	2	3	4	4	4	5
S.E. Melbourne Phoenix	1	1	2	2	2	2	4	3	1	2	3	2	2	2	4	5	5	6	6	6	6
Sydney Kings	5	4	5	7	7	6	8	7	5	6	5	4	5	5	3	3	2	2	2	2	3
Tasmania JackJumpers	4	8	9	9	9	9	9	9	6	4	6	6	6	6	6	6	6	5	5	5	4

=== Game log ===
2021–22 game log
Total: 19–9 (home: 8–6; road: 11–3)
December: 3–1 (Home: 1–0; Road: 2–1)

Game	Date	Team	Score	High points	High rebounds	High assists	Location Attendance	Record
1	5 December	@ Adelaide	W 71–81	Duop Reath (18)	Duop Reath (9)	Tyler Harvey (6)	Adelaide Entertainment Centre; 4,802	1–0
2	11 December	@ Sydney	W 84–92	Duop Reath (27)	Sam Froling (13)	Jessup, Rathan-Mayes (4)	Qudos Bank Arena; 6,212	2–0
3	17 December	New Zealand	W 97–96 (2OT)	Tyler Harvey (26)	Duop Reath (13)	Justinian Jessup (4)	WIN Entertainment Centre; 2,873	3–0
4	19 December	@ Brisbane	L 96–92	H.Froling, Reath (15)	Sam Froling (11)	H.Froling, Jessup (4)	Nissan Arena; 3,584	3–1

January: 3–3 (Home: 2–3; Road: 1–0)

Game	Date	Team	Score	High points	High rebounds	High assists	Location Attendance	Record
5	13 January	Sydney	W 97–89	Sam Froling (27)	Sam Froling (10)	Tyler Harvey (5)	WIN Entertainment Centre; 1,994	4–1
6	16 January	Melbourne	L 84–88	Justinian Jessup (18)	Sam Froling (13)	Xavier Rathan-Mayes (5)	WIN Entertainment Centre; 1,753	4–2
7	22 January	Perth	L 78–94	Jessup, Rathan-Mayes (17)	Cleveland, S.Froling, Rathan-Mayes (8)	Harvey, Rathan-Mayes (4)	WIN Entertainment Centre; 2,278	4–3
8	24 January	Adelaide	W 100–89	Harry Froling (27)	Harry Froling (9)	Xavier Rathan-Mayes (7)	WIN Entertainment Centre; 2,141	5–3
9	27 January	Perth	L 80–94	Antonius Cleveland (22)	Cleveland, Reath (7)	S.Froling, Harvey, Rathan-Mayes (3)	WIN Entertainment Centre; 2,240	5–4
10	29 January	@ Cairns	W 75–94	Tyler Harvey (24)	Sam Froling (13)	Harvey, Jessup (3)	Cairns Convention Centre; 3,095	6–4

February: 3–3 (Home: 3–2; Road: 0–1)

Game	Date	Team	Score	High points	High rebounds	High assists	Location Attendance	Record
11	2 February	@ New Zealand	L 90–67	Tyler Harvey (17)	Cleveland, S.Froling (7)	Tyler Harvey (3)	MyState Bank Arena closed event	6–5
12	7 February	S.E. Melbourne	L 87–88	Tyler Harvey (20)	Rathan-Mayes, Reath (8)	Xavier Rathan-Mayes (5)	WIN Entertainment Centre; 2,040	6–6
13	12 February	Cairns	W 87–81	Jessup, Reath (18)	Duop Reath (10)	Xavier Rathan-Mayes (5)	WIN Entertainment Centre; 2,652	7–6
14	18 February	Cairns	W 79–54	Duop Reath (16)	Sam Froling (10)	Xavier Rathan-Mayes (4)	WIN Entertainment Centre; 2,275	8–6
15	20 February	Tasmania	L 86–96	Duop Reath (25)	Xavier Rathan-Mayes (10)	Xavier Rathan-Mayes (9)	WIN Entertainment Centre; 2,325	8–7
16	25 February	Adelaide	W 87–71	Duop Reath (18)	Sam Froling (9)	Antonius Cleveland (6)	WIN Entertainment Centre; 3,002	9–7

March: 6–1 (Home: 2–0; Road: 4–1)

Game	Date	Team	Score	High points	High rebounds	High assists	Location Attendance	Record
17	1 March	@ New Zealand	W 87–102	Justinian Jessup (23)	Coenraad, S.Froling (8)	Xavier Rathan-Mayes (7)	MyState Bank Arena closed event	10–7
18	6 March	@ S.E. Melbourne	W 77–83	Xavier Rathan-Mayes (19)	Cleveland, Jessup (7)	Cleveland, H.Froling, Harvey, Rathan-Mayes (3)	John Cain Arena; 2,989	11–7
19	13 March	@ Tasmania	L 81–77	Tyler Harvey (16)	Duop Reath (7)	Sam Froling (4)	MyState Bank Arena; 4,738	11–8
20	17 March	S.E. Melbourne	W 103–97	Harvey, Reath (22)	Duop Reath (12)	Antonius Cleveland (4)	WIN Entertainment Centre; 2,324	12–8
21	19 March	@ Tasmania	W 65–91	Antonius Cleveland (22)	Duop Reath (11)	Xavier Rathan-Mayes (5)	Silverdome; 3,532	13–8
22	27 March	@ Melbourne	W 77–92	Antonius Cleveland (20)	Antonius Cleveland (8)	Xavier Rathan-Mayes (7)	John Cain Arena; 5,017	14–8
23	31 March	Brisbane	W 87–70	Justinian Jessup (29)	Antonius Cleveland (9)	Antonius Cleveland (6)	WIN Entertainment Centre; 2,262	15–8

April: 4–1 (Home: 0–1; Road: 4–0)

Game	Date	Team	Score	High points	High rebounds	High assists	Location Attendance	Record
24	2 April	@ Melbourne	W 90–96	Xavier Rathan-Mayes (25)	Jessup, Reath (9)	Xavier Rathan-Mayes (8)	John Cain Arena; 4,517	16–8
25	9 April	@ Brisbane	W 77–108	Duop Reath (28)	Duop Reath (11)	Cleveland, Harvey (6)	Nissan Arena; 3,652	17–8
26	14 April	Sydney	L 102–107 (OT)	Tyler Harvey (35)	Sam Froling (13)	Tyler Harvey (5)	WIN Entertainment Centre; 4,872	17–9
27	22 April	@ Perth	W 77–82	Tyler Harvey (22)	Cleveland, S.Froling (11)	Xavier Rathan-Mayes (4)	RAC Arena; 10,251	18–9
28	24 April	@ Sydney	W 84–87	Justinian Jessup (24)	Cleveland, Reath (6)	Xavier Rathan-Mayes (4)	Qudos Bank Arena; 12,632	19–9

2021–22 season schedule

== Postseason ==
2022 finals game log
Total: 0–2 (home: 0–1; road: 0–1)
Semifinals: 0–2 (Home: 0–1; Road: 0–1)

Game	Date	Team	Score	High points	High rebounds	High assists	Location Attendance	Series
1	29 April	Sydney	L 79–89	Duop Reath (26)	Duop Reath (11)	Xavier Rathan-Mayes (4)	WIN Entertainment Centre; 5,621	1–0
2	1 May	@ Sydney	L 99–87	Tyler Harvey (21)	Antonius Cleveland (12)	Harvey, Jessup (3)	Qudos Bank Arena; 9,824	0–2

2022 finals schedule

== Transactions ==
=== Re-signed ===
Player	Signed
Tyler Harvey	9 July
Isaac White	13 July
Lachlan Dent	14 July
Andrew Ogilvy	16 July
Tim Coenraad	1 September
Sam Froling	25 February
Daniel Grida	17 March

=== Additions ===
Player	Signed	Former team
Duop Reath	19 July	Crvena zvezda
Travis Trice	21 July	Galatasaray
Harry Froling	23 July	Brisbane Bullets
Xavier Rathan-Mayes	18 October	CSU Sibiu
Alex Mudronja	15 November	Adelaide 36ers

=== Subtractions ===
Player	Reason left	New team
Deng Deng	Free agent	Brisbane Bullets
Max Darling	Released	Canterbury Rams
Justin Simon	Free agent	ratiopharm Ulm
Travis Trice	Mutual consent	Śląsk Wrocław
Cameron Bairstow	Free agent	Adelaide 36ers

== Awards ==
=== Club awards ===
- Club MVP: Duop Reath
- Members Choice Award: Antonius Cleveland
- Player's Player Award: Antonius Cleveland
- Defensive Player: Antonius Cleveland
- Community Award: Daniel Grida
- Club Person of the Year: Joe Tertzakian

=== NBL Awards ===
- NBL Best Defensive Player Award: Antonius Cleveland
- All-NBL First Team: Antonius Cleveland

== See also ==
- 2021–22 NBL season
- Illawarra Hawks
