= 2021–22 Brisbane Bullets season =

Australian basketball club season

- Head coach: (Canada) James Duncan
- Captain: (Australia) Jason Cadee
- Arena: Nissan Arena

NBL results
- Record: 10–18 (35.7%)
- Ladder: 8th
- Finals finish: Did not qualify
- Stats at NBL.com.au

Player records
- Points: (United States) Franks 18.2
- Rebounds: (United States) Franks 8.9
- Assists: (Australia) Cadee 4.9
- All statistics correct as of 24 April 2022.

The 2021–22 NBL season was the 36th season for the Brisbane Bullets in the NBL.

== Roster ==
Note: Flags indicate national team eligibility at FIBA-sanctioned events. Players may hold other non-FIBA nationalities not displayed.

2021–22 Brisbane Bullets roster
Players
Coaches

Pos.	No.	Nat.	Name	Ht.	Wt.	Age
G	0	(Australia)	Wigness, Tamuri	1.80 m (5 ft 11 in)	84 kg (185 lb)	24 – 26 March 2002
F	1	(United States)	Franks, Robert (I)	2.01 m (6 ft 7 in)	102 kg (225 lb)	29 – 18 December 1996
F	2	(New Zealand)	Samuel, Taane (DP)	2.00 m (6 ft 7 in)	105 kg (231 lb)	27 – 26 April 1999
G/F	3	(Australia)	Drmic, Anthony	1.98 m (6 ft 6 in)	93 kg (205 lb)	34 – 25 February 1992
G	4	(United States)	Moss, Isaiah (I)	1.96 m (6 ft 5 in)	94 kg (207 lb)	29 – 8 October 1996
G	5	(Australia)	Cadee, Jason (C)	1.86 m (6 ft 1 in)	80 kg (176 lb)	35 – 15 April 1991
F	9	(Australia)	Mackinnon, Max (DP)	1.96 m (6 ft 5 in)	96 kg (212 lb)	22 – 9 October 2003
G/F	10	(France)	Digbeu, Tom (NS)	1.96 m (6 ft 5 in)	77 kg (170 lb)	24 – 24 September 2001
G/F	13	(United States)	Patterson, Lamar (I)	1.96 m (6 ft 5 in)	100 kg (220 lb)	34 – 12 August 1991
G	17	(Australia)	Krebs, Tanner	1.98 m (6 ft 6 in)	91 kg (201 lb)	30 – 4 January 1996
G	20	(Australia)	Sobey, Nathan	1.88 m (6 ft 2 in)	86 kg (190 lb)	35 – 14 July 1990
C	21	(China)	Chuanxing Liu (DP & SRP)	2.26 m (7 ft 5 in)	130 kg (287 lb)	28 – 30 July 1997
C	24	(New Zealand)	Harrison, Tyrell	2.14 m (7 ft 0 in)	95 kg (209 lb)	26 – 6 July 1999
F	27	(South Sudan)	Deng, Deng	2.03 m (6 ft 8 in)	93 kg (205 lb)	34 – 5 January 1992
C	33	(New Zealand)	Salt, Jack	2.08 m (6 ft 10 in)	117 kg (258 lb)	30 – 11 February 1996

Head coach

- (Canada) James Duncan

Assistant coach(es)

- (Australia) Greg Vanderjagt
- (Australia) Peter Crawford

Legend

- (C) Team captain
- (DP) Development player
- (IN) Inactive
- (I) Import player
- (SRP) Special restricted player
- (NS) Next Star player
- Injured

- Roster
Updated: 11 October 2021

== Pre-season ==
=== Game log ===
2021 NBL Blitz game log
Total: 3–1 (Home: 1–1; Road: 2–0)
November: 3–1 (Home: 1–1; Road: 2–0)

Game	Date	Team	Score	High points	High rebounds	High assists	Location Attendance	Record
1	14 November	@ Tasmania	W 79–89	Nathan Sobey (17)	Franks, Sobey (7)	Lamar Patterson (6)	MyState Bank Arena; 4,500	1–0
2	19 November	Perth	W 100–90	Digbeu, Harrison, Patterson (16)	Tyrell Harrison (9)	Lamar Patterson (7)	Ulverstone Sports & Leisure Centre not available	2–0
3	24 November	@ Cairns	W 86–94	Nathan Sobey (27)	Robert Franks (8)	Nathan Sobey (8)	Ulverstone Sports & Leisure Centre not available	3–0
4	28 November	Adelaide	L 67–72	Tanner Krebs (15)	Deng, Salt (9)	Jason Cadee (3)	MyState Bank Arena not available	3–1

== Regular season ==
=== Ladder ===
Pos	2021–22 NBL season											
Pos	Team	Pld	W	L	PCT	Last 5	Streak	Home	Away	PF	PA	PP
1	Melbourne United	28	20	8	71.43%	4–1	L1	9–5	11–3	2455	2244	109.40%
2	Illawarra Hawks	28	19	9	67.86%	4–1	W2	8–6	11–3	2498	2345	106.52%
3	Sydney Kings	28	19	9	67.86%	3–2	L1	9–5	10–4	2397	2313	103.63%
4	Tasmania JackJumpers	28	17	11	60.71%	4–1	W4	8–6	9–5	2230	2220	100.45%
5	Perth Wildcats	28	16	12	57.14%	2–3	L2	7–7	9–5	2495	2377	104.96%
6	S.E. Melbourne Phoenix	28	15	13	53.57%	3–2	W2	7–7	8–6	2456	2424	101.32%
7	Adelaide 36ers	28	10	18	35.71%	3–2	W1	6–8	4–10	2283	2346	97.31%
8	Brisbane Bullets	28	10	18	35.71%	2–3	L2	6–8	4–10	2379	2500	95.16%
9	Cairns Taipans	28	9	19	32.14%	1–4	W1	5–9	4–10	2228	2408	92.52%
10	New Zealand Breakers	28	5	23	17.86%	0–5	L10	2–12	3–11	2234	2478	90.15%

Updated to match(es) played on 24 April 2022. Source: NBL.com.au

=== Ladder progression ===
- Numbers highlighted in green indicate that the team finished the round inside the top four.
- Numbers highlighted in blue indicates the team finished first on the ladder in that round.
- Numbers highlighted in red indicates the team finished last place on the ladder in that round.

2021–22 NBL season
Team	1	2	3	4	5	6	7	8	9	10	11	12	13	14	15	16	17	18	19	20	21
Adelaide 36ers	8	6	8	8	8	8	7	8	8	8	8	7	8	8	8	8	8	9	9	8	7
Brisbane Bullets	7	5	7	6	6	7	6	5	7	9	7	8	7	7	7	7	7	7	7	7	8
Cairns Taipans	9	7	4	4	5	5	5	6	9	7	9	10	9	9	10	9	9	8	8	9	9
Illawarra Hawks	3	2	3	3	3	3	3	4	4	5	4	5	4	4	5	4	4	3	3	3	2
Melbourne United	6	9	6	5	4	4	1	1	2	3	1	1	1	1	1	1	1	1	1	1	1
New Zealand Breakers	10	10	10	10	10	10	10	10	10	10	10	9	10	10	9	10	10	10	10	10	10
Perth Wildcats	2	3	1	1	1	1	2	2	3	1	2	3	3	3	2	2	3	4	4	4	5
S.E. Melbourne Phoenix	1	1	2	2	2	2	4	3	1	2	3	2	2	2	4	5	5	6	6	6	6
Sydney Kings	5	4	5	7	7	6	8	7	5	6	5	4	5	5	3	3	2	2	2	2	3
Tasmania JackJumpers	4	8	9	9	9	9	9	9	6	4	6	6	6	6	6	6	6	5	5	5	4

=== Game log ===
2021–22 game log
Total: 10–18 (Home: 6–8; Road: 4–10)
December: 2–2 (Home: 1–0; Road: 1–2)

Game	Date	Team	Score	High points	High rebounds	High assists	Location Attendance	Record
1	3 December	@ Tasmania	L 83–74 (OT)	Nathan Sobey (24)	Franks, Harrison (11)	Lamar Patterson (6)	MyState Bank Arena; 4,738	0–1
2	12 December	@ Perth	W 94–97 (2OT)	Lamar Patterson (27)	Tyrell Harrison (14)	Jason Cadee (7)	RAC Arena; 11,295	1–1
3	17 December	@ Perth	L 83–70	Robert Franks (28)	Robert Franks (9)	Nathan Sobey (4)	RAC Arena; 11,745	1–2
4	19 December	Illawarra	W 96–92	Nathan Sobey (17)	Tyrell Harrison (8)	Nathan Sobey (5)	Nissan Arena; 3,584	2–2

January: 2–4 (Home: 2–3; Road: 0–1)

Game	Date	Team	Score	High points	High rebounds	High assists	Location Attendance	Record
5	9 January	New Zealand	L 83–88	Lamar Patterson (17)	Robert Franks (9)	Nathan Sobey (7)	Nissan Arena; 2,925	2–3
6	15 January	S.E. Melbourne	W 100–84	Nathan Sobey (18)	Robert Franks (10)	Lamar Patterson (8)	Nissan Arena; 2,389	3–3
7	21 January	Sydney	W 96–87	Nathan Sobey (30)	Tyrell Harrison (13)	Jason Cadee (5)	Nissan Arena; 2,574	4–3
8	23 January	@ Sydney	L 97–73	Lamar Patterson (16)	Franks, Patterson (8)	Krebs, Sobey (3)	Qudos Bank Arena; 4,237	4–4
9	26 January	Melbourne	L 82–84	Lamar Patterson (21)	Robert Franks (8)	Jason Cadee (4)	Nissan Arena; 2,479	4–5
10	29 January	S.E. Melbourne	L 73–88	Lamar Patterson (26)	Deng Deng (11)	Lamar Patterson (5)	Nissan Arena; 2,552	4–6

February: 2–4 (Home: 2–1; Road: 0–3)

Game	Date	Team	Score	High points	High rebounds	High assists	Location Attendance	Record
11	5 February	Cairns	L 94–102	Robert Franks (22)	Tyrell Harrison (8)	Jason Cadee (5)	Nissan Arena; 2,695	4–7
12	11 February	Adelaide	W 77–73	Lamar Patterson (32)	Drmic, Franks (5)	Jason Cadee (9)	Nissan Arena; 2,358	5–7
13	13 February	@ Sydney	L 71–69	Robert Franks (18)	Robert Franks (9)	Jason Cadee (6)	Qudos Bank Arena; 5,543	5–8
14	19 February	@ S.E. Melbourne	L 98–94	Lamar Patterson (27)	Robert Franks (8)	Jason Cadee (8)	John Cain Arena; 3,252	5–9
15	24 February	@ Cairns	L 73–69	Jason Cadee (15)	Tyrell Harrison (7)	Jason Cadee (8)	Cairns Convention Centre; 2,853	5–10
16	26 February	Tasmania	W 94–86	Robert Franks (23)	Robert Franks (11)	Lamar Patterson (10)	Nissan Arena; 2,683	6–10

March: 2–5 (Home: 0–3; Road: 2–2)

Game	Date	Team	Score	High points	High rebounds	High assists	Location Attendance	Record
17	5 March	@ Melbourne	L 95–83	Robert Franks (20)	Cadee, Salt (5)	Cadee, Patterson (5)	John Cain Arena; 6,086	6–11
18	7 March	@ New Zealand	W 74–92	Robert Franks (23)	Robert Franks (10)	Jason Cadee (9)	MyState Bank Arena closed event	7–11
19	12 March	Perth	L 83–95	Robert Franks (21)	Robert Franks (8)	Lamar Patterson (8)	Nissan Arena; 3,202	7–12
20	20 March	Cairns	L 88–98	Robert Franks (22)	Robert Franks (10)	Drmic, Patterson (4)	Nissan Arena; 2,409	7–13
21	24 March	@ New Zealand	W 100–101 (OT)	Robert Franks (31)	Robert Franks (12)	Jason Cadee (11)	Cairns Convention Centre closed event	8–13
22	26 March	Tasmania	L 82–84	Robert Franks (21)	Robert Franks (12)	Lamar Patterson (6)	Nissan Arena; 2,489	8–14
23	31 March	@ Illawarra	L 87–70	Digbeu, Franks (13)	Robert Franks (13)	Franks, Patterson (5)	WIN Entertainment Centre; 2,262	8–15

April: 2–3 (Home: 1–1; Road: 1–2)

Game	Date	Team	Score	High points	High rebounds	High assists	Location Attendance	Record
24	3 April	Adelaide	W 92–91	Jason Cadee (26)	Robert Franks (12)	Jason Cadee (5)	Nissan Arena; 3,280	9–15
25	9 April	Illawarra	L 77–108	Robert Franks (19)	Lamar Patterson (6)	Cadee, Digbeu (5)	Nissan Arena; 3,652	9–16
26	11 April	@ Adelaide	W 85–93	Cadee, Digbeu, Patterson (15)	Deng Deng (8)	Anthony Drmic (4)	Adelaide Entertainment Centre; 3,829	10–16
27	16 April	@ Melbourne	L 88–79	Lamar Patterson (23)	Lamar Patterson (10)	Jason Cadee (6)	John Cain Arena; 5,721	10–17
28	23 April	@ Cairns	L 112–98	Robert Franks (30)	Robert Franks (15)	Cadee, Drmic (7)	Cairns Convention Centre; 3,552	10–18

2021–22 season schedule

== Transactions ==
=== Re-signed ===
Player	Signed
Tyrell Harrison	11 May
Jason Cadee	2 July
Lamar Patterson	29 July
Nathan Sobey	27 April

=== Additions ===
Player	Signed	Former team
Jack Salt	7 July	Canterbury Rams
Deng Deng	10 July	Illawarra Hawks
Isaiah Moss	12 July	Otago Nuggets
Taane Samuel	6 August	Wellington Saints
Robert Franks	28 August	Orlando Magic
Tom Digbeu	6 September	BC Prienai
Liu Chuanxing	7 September	Qingdao Eagles
Max Mackinnon	15 September	Australian Institute of Sport

=== Subtractions ===
Player	Reason left	New team
Harry Froling	Free agent	Illawarra Hawks
Callum Dalton	Free agent	Melbourne United
Vic Law	Free agent	Perth Wildcats
Matt Hodgson	Free agent	Perth Wildcats
B. J. Johnson	Free agent	Orlando Magic

== Awards ==
=== Club awards ===
- Young Player Award: Chuanxing Liu
- Defensive Player: Deng Deng
- Members MVP: Robert Franks
- Players Player Award: Jack Salt
- Club MVP: Robert Franks

== See also ==
- 2021–22 NBL season
- Brisbane Bullets
