= 2021–22 Adelaide 36ers season =

National Basketball League team season

- Head coach: (Australia) C. J. Bruton
- Captain: (Australia) Mitch McCarron
- Arena: Adelaide Entertainment Centre

NBL results
- Record: 10–18 (35.7%)
- Ladder: 7th
- Finals finish: Did not qualify
- Stats at NBL.com.au

Player records
- Points: (Australia) Johnson 16.1
- Rebounds: (Australia) Bairstow 8.0
- Assists: (Australia) McCarron 4.9
- All statistics correct as of 24 April 2022.

The 2021–22 NBL season was the 41st season for the Adelaide 36ers in the NBL.

== Roster ==
Note: Flags indicate national team eligibility at FIBA-sanctioned events. Players may hold other non-FIBA nationalities not displayed.

2021–22 Adelaide 36ers roster
Players
Coaches

Pos.	No.	Nat.	Name	Ht.	Wt.	Age
G	1	(Australia)	Dufelmeier, Tad	1.83 m (6 ft 0 in)	79 kg (174 lb)	30 – 9 February 1996
F	2	(South Sudan)	Malou, Emmanuel	2.06 m (6 ft 9 in)	98 kg (216 lb)	32 – 3 November 1993
G	3	(United States)	Hannahs, Dusty (I)	1.93 m (6 ft 4 in)	88 kg (194 lb)	32 – 2 October 1993
G	7	(New Zealand)	King, Mojave (NS)	1.95 m (6 ft 5 in)	88 kg (194 lb)	23 – 11 June 2002
C	8	(Australia)	Humphries, Isaac (injured)	2.11 m (6 ft 11 in)	116 kg (256 lb)	28 – 5 January 1998
F	9	(Australia)	Marshall, Nick (DP)	1.98 m (6 ft 6 in)	93 kg (205 lb)	26 – 5 July 1999
G	10	(Australia)	McCarron, Mitch (C)	1.89 m (6 ft 2 in)	97 kg (214 lb)	33 – 30 June 1992
C	11	(Philippines)	Sotto, Kai (SRP)	2.20 m (7 ft 3 in)	105 kg (231 lb)	23 – 11 May 2002
F	21	(Australia)	Johnson, Daniel	2.12 m (6 ft 11 in)	108 kg (238 lb)	37 – 3 April 1988
F	22	(New Zealand)	Harris, Hyrum	1.98 m (6 ft 6 in)	90 kg (198 lb)	29 – 6 March 1996
F	25	(Australia)	Gattorna, Isaac (DP)	2.01 m (6 ft 7 in)	94 kg (207 lb)	26 – 8 May 1999
G	30	(Australia)	Olbrich, Lachlan (DP)	2.08 m (6 ft 10 in)		22 – 30 December 2003
F	35	(United States)	Withers, Todd (I)	2.02 m (6 ft 8 in)	98 kg (216 lb)	29 – 6 May 1996
F	41	(Australia)	Bairstow, Cameron	2.06 m (6 ft 9 in)	113 kg (249 lb)	35 – 7 December 1990
G	44	(South Sudan)	Dech, Sunday	1.95 m (6 ft 5 in)	93 kg (205 lb)	32 – 1 January 1994

Head coach

- (Australia) C. J. Bruton

Assistant coach(es)

- (Australia) Jamie Pearlman

Legend

- (C) Team captain
- (DP) Development player
- (IN) Inactive
- (I) Import player
- (SRP) Special restricted player
- (NS) Next Star player
- Injured

- Roster
Updated: 13 February 2022

== Pre-season ==
=== Game log ===
2021 NBL Blitz game log
Total: 5–0 (Home: 2–0; Road: 3–0)
November: 5–0 (Home: 2–0; Road: 3–0)

Game	Date	Team	Score	High points	High rebounds	High assists	Location Attendance	Record
1	14 November	@ Cairns	W 87–91 (OT)	Daniel Johnson (33)	Cameron Bairstow (11)	Dech, McCarron (4)	MyState Bank Arena; 4,500	1–0
2	16 November	@ Perth	W 56–63	Hannahs, King (11)	Bairstow, Humphries (7)	Mitch McCarron (4)	MyState Bank Arena not available	2–0
3	21 November	Tasmania	W 82–80	Dusty Hannahs (19)	Isaac Humphries (6)	Mitch McCarron (12)	Ulverstone Sports & Leisure Centre not available	3–0
4	26 November	Perth	W 97–93	Hannahs, Withers (19)	Daniel Johnson (6)	Mitch McCarron (9)	Elphin Sports Centre not available	4–0
5	28 November	@ Brisbane	W 67–72	Daniel Johnson (16)	Nick Marshall (12)	Mitch McCarron (8)	MyState Bank Arena not available	5–0

== Regular season ==
=== Ladder ===
Pos	2021–22 NBL season											
Pos	Team	Pld	W	L	PCT	Last 5	Streak	Home	Away	PF	PA	PP
1	Melbourne United	28	20	8	71.43%	4–1	L1	9–5	11–3	2455	2244	109.40%
2	Illawarra Hawks	28	19	9	67.86%	4–1	W2	8–6	11–3	2498	2345	106.52%
3	Sydney Kings	28	19	9	67.86%	3–2	L1	9–5	10–4	2397	2313	103.63%
4	Tasmania JackJumpers	28	17	11	60.71%	4–1	W4	8–6	9–5	2230	2220	100.45%
5	Perth Wildcats	28	16	12	57.14%	2–3	L2	7–7	9–5	2495	2377	104.96%
6	S.E. Melbourne Phoenix	28	15	13	53.57%	3–2	W2	7–7	8–6	2456	2424	101.32%
7	Adelaide 36ers	28	10	18	35.71%	3–2	W1	6–8	4–10	2283	2346	97.31%
8	Brisbane Bullets	28	10	18	35.71%	2–3	L2	6–8	4–10	2379	2500	95.16%
9	Cairns Taipans	28	9	19	32.14%	1–4	W1	5–9	4–10	2228	2408	92.52%
10	New Zealand Breakers	28	5	23	17.86%	0–5	L10	2–12	3–11	2234	2478	90.15%

Updated to match(es) played on 24 April 2022. Source: NBL.com.au

=== Ladder progression ===
- Numbers highlighted in green indicate that the team finished the round inside the top four.
- Numbers highlighted in blue indicates the team finished first on the ladder in that round.
- Numbers highlighted in red indicates the team finished last place on the ladder in that round.

2021–22 NBL season
Team	1	2	3	4	5	6	7	8	9	10	11	12	13	14	15	16	17	18	19	20	21
Adelaide 36ers	8	6	8	8	8	8	7	8	8	8	8	7	8	8	8	8	8	9	9	8	7
Brisbane Bullets	7	5	7	6	6	7	6	5	7	9	7	8	7	7	7	7	7	7	7	7	8
Cairns Taipans	9	7	4	4	5	5	5	6	9	7	9	10	9	9	10	9	9	8	8	9	9
Illawarra Hawks	3	2	3	3	3	3	3	4	4	5	4	5	4	4	5	4	4	3	3	3	2
Melbourne United	6	9	6	5	4	4	1	1	2	3	1	1	1	1	1	1	1	1	1	1	1
New Zealand Breakers	10	10	10	10	10	10	10	10	10	10	10	9	10	10	9	10	10	10	10	10	10
Perth Wildcats	2	3	1	1	1	1	2	2	3	1	2	3	3	3	2	2	3	4	4	4	5
S.E. Melbourne Phoenix	1	1	2	2	2	2	4	3	1	2	3	2	2	2	4	5	5	6	6	6	6
Sydney Kings	5	4	5	7	7	6	8	7	5	6	5	4	5	5	3	3	2	2	2	2	3
Tasmania JackJumpers	4	8	9	9	9	9	9	9	6	4	6	6	6	6	6	6	6	5	5	5	4

=== Game log ===
2021–22 game log
Total: 10–18 (Home: 6–8; Road: 4–10)
December: 2–3 (Home: 1–1; Road: 1–2)

Game	Date	Team	Score	High points	High rebounds	High assists	Location Attendance	Record
1	3 December	@ Perth	L 85–73	Daniel Johnson (22)	Todd Withers (11)	Mitch McCarron (9)	RAC Arena; 11,950	0–1
2	5 December	Illawarra	L 71–81	Cameron Bairstow (15)	Todd Withers (13)	Bairstow, McCarron (4)	Adelaide Entertainment Centre; 4,802	0–2
3	9 December	@ Tasmania	W 80–83	Dusty Hannahs (15)	Humphries, McCarron (6)	Dusty Hannahs (4)	MyState Bank Arena; 4,738	1–2
4	12 December	New Zealand	W 98–85	Dusty Hannahs (25)	Mitch McCarron (13)	Mitch McCarron (5)	Adelaide Entertainment Centre; 4,445	2–2
5	18 December	@ Cairns	L 93–67	Dusty Hannahs (20)	Isaac Humphries (10)	Mitch McCarron (4)	Cairns Convention Centre; 3,314	2–3

January: 2–3 (Home: 2–1; Road: 0–2)

Game	Date	Team	Score	High points	High rebounds	High assists	Location Attendance	Record
6	18 January	Perth	W 87–74	Daniel Johnson (21)	Mitch McCarron (12)	Mitch McCarron (8)	Adelaide Entertainment Centre; 4,758	3–3
7	22 January	Melbourne	L 78–97	Cameron Bairstow (18)	Mitch McCarron (10)	Mitch McCarron (7)	Adelaide Entertainment Centre; 4,819	3–4
8	24 January	@ Illawarra	L 100–89	Sunday Dech (20)	Cameron Bairstow (10)	Mitch McCarron (5)	WIN Entertainment Centre; 2,141	3–5
9	28 January	@ Tasmania	L 76–71	Dusty Hannahs (22)	Cameron Bairstow (18)	Daniel Johnson (5)	MyState Bank Arena; 4,632	3–6
10	30 January	Melbourne	W 88–83 (OT)	Dusty Hannahs (19)	Cameron Bairstow (13)	Bairstow, McCarron (5)	Adelaide Entertainment Centre; 4,906	4–6

February: 1–3 (Home: 1–1; Road: 0–2)

Game	Date	Team	Score	High points	High rebounds	High assists	Location Attendance	Record
11	11 February	@ Brisbane	L 77–73	Daniel Johnson (15)	Daniel Johnson (14)	Johnson, McCarron (4)	Nissan Arena; 2,358	4–7
12	20 February	Cairns	W 82–71	Daniel Johnson (18)	Daniel Johnson (9)	Dech, McCarron (5)	Adelaide Entertainment Centre; 5,068	5–7
13	25 February	@ Illawarra	L 87–71	Sunday Dech (18)	Cameron Bairstow (12)	Mitch McCarron (4)	WIN Entertainment Centre; 3,001	5–8
14	27 February	Sydney	L 90–93	Dusty Hannahs (24)	Bairstow, Johnson (8)	Mitch McCarron (7)	Adelaide Entertainment Centre; 4,813	5–9

March: 2–4 (Home: 2–2; Road: 0–2)

Game	Date	Team	Score	High points	High rebounds	High assists	Location Attendance	Record
15	4 March	S.E. Melbourne	L 76–83	Daniel Johnson (31)	Johnson, Sotto (8)	Mitch McCarron (9)	Adelaide Entertainment Centre; 4,775	5–10
16	6 March	Perth	L 73–92	Daniel Johnson (19)	Daniel Johnson (12)	Mitch McCarron (6)	Adelaide Entertainment Centre; 4,157	5–11
17	12 March	@ New Zealand	L 84–75	Kai Sotto (14)	Sunday Dech (8)	Sunday Dech (7)	Adelaide Arena; 3,044	5–12
18	18 March	Cairns	W 83–57	Mitch McCarron (21)	Mitch McCarron (10)	Dech, McCarron (3)	Adelaide Entertainment Centre; 3,596	6–12
19	20 March	@ Melbourne	L 101–74	Daniel Johnson (18)	Sunday Dech (6)	Dufelmeier, McCarron (3)	John Cain Arena; 5,814	6–13
20	27 March	S.E. Melbourne	W 100–92	Daniel Johnson (22)	Daniel Johnson (10)	Tad Dufelmeier (4)	Adelaide Entertainment Centre; 3,765	7–13

April: 3–5 (Home: 0–3; Road: 3–2)

Game	Date	Team	Score	High points	High rebounds	High assists	Location Attendance	Record
21	1 April	Tasmania	L 72–80	Daniel Johnson (16)	Mitch McCarron (6)	Mitch McCarron (8)	Adelaide Entertainment Centre; 3,407	7–14
22	3 April	@ Brisbane	L 92–91	Daniel Johnson (28)	Mitch McCarron (10)	Mitch McCarron (7)	Nissan Arena; 3,280	7–15
23	9 April	Sydney	L 77–84	Daniel Johnson (20)	Johnson, McCarron (7)	Johnson, McCarron (4)	Adelaide Entertainment Centre; 4,748	7–16
24	11 April	Brisbane	L 85–93	Kai Sotto (21)	Daniel Johnson (10)	Johnson, McCarron (6)	Adelaide Entertainment Centre; 3,829	7–17
25	14 April	@ Perth	W 70–82	Dech, Hannahs, Johnson (23)	Dech, McCarron (9)	Mitch McCarron (6)	RAC Arena; 10,272	8–17
26	17 April	@ Sydney	W 82–90	Dusty Hannahs (22)	Daniel Johnson (12)	Dusty Hannahs (4)	Qudos Bank Arena; 10,260	9–17
27	22 April	@ S.E. Melbourne	L 94–91	Sunday Dech (20)	Daniel Johnson (6)	Dech, Dufelmeier (6)	John Cain Arena; 4,673	9–18
28	24 April	@ New Zealand	W 60–93	Sunday Dech (19)	Dech, Sotto, Withers (7)	Tad Dufelmeier (5)	MyState Bank Arena closed event	10–18

2021–22 season schedule

== Transactions ==
=== Re-signed ===
Player	Signed
Isaac Humphries	9 July
Sunday Dech	29 April
Hyrum Harris	3 May

=== Additions ===
Player	Signed	Former team
Kai Sotto	21 April	N/A
Mitch McCarron	13 July	Melbourne United
Mojave King	14 July	Cairns Taipans
Dusty Hannahs	20 July	Santa Cruz Warriors
Tad Dufelmeier	22 July	Cairns Taipans
Emmanuel Malou	28 July	Mackay Meteors
Todd Withers	5 August	Fortitudo Bologna
Lachlan Olbrich	16 October	Southern Tigers
Zac Gattorna	26 October	Perth Redbacks
Hyrum Harris	3 November	Hawke's Bay Hawks
Cameron Bairstow	8 November	Illawarra Hawks
Nick Marshall	10 November	Mount Gambier Pioneers

=== Subtractions ===
Player	Reason left	New team
Alex Mudronja	Released	Illawarra Hawks
Jack McVeigh	Free agent	Tasmania JackJumpers
Brandon Paul	Free agent	Club Joventut Badalona
Keanu Pinder	Free agent	Cairns Taipans
Josh Giddey	NBA draft	Oklahoma City Thunder
Jack Purchase	Free agent	Perth Wildcats
Tony Crocker	Free agent	SIG Strasbourg
Daniel Dillon	Free agent	Waverley Falcons
Brendan Teys	Free agent	N/A
Kai Sotto	NBA draft	N/A

== Awards ==
=== Pre-season ===
- Loggins-Bruton Cup: Adelaide 36ers
- Most Valuable Player (Ray Borner Medal): Mitch McCarron

=== Club awards ===
- Most Improved: Hyrum Harris
- Coaches Award: Cameron Bairstow
- Members Choice: Daniel Johnson
- Best Defensive Player: Sunday Dech
- Chairman's Award: Mitch McCarron
- Club MVP: Daniel Johnson

== See also ==
- 2021–22 NBL season
- Adelaide 36ers
