= Caleb Agada =

Nigerian basketball player

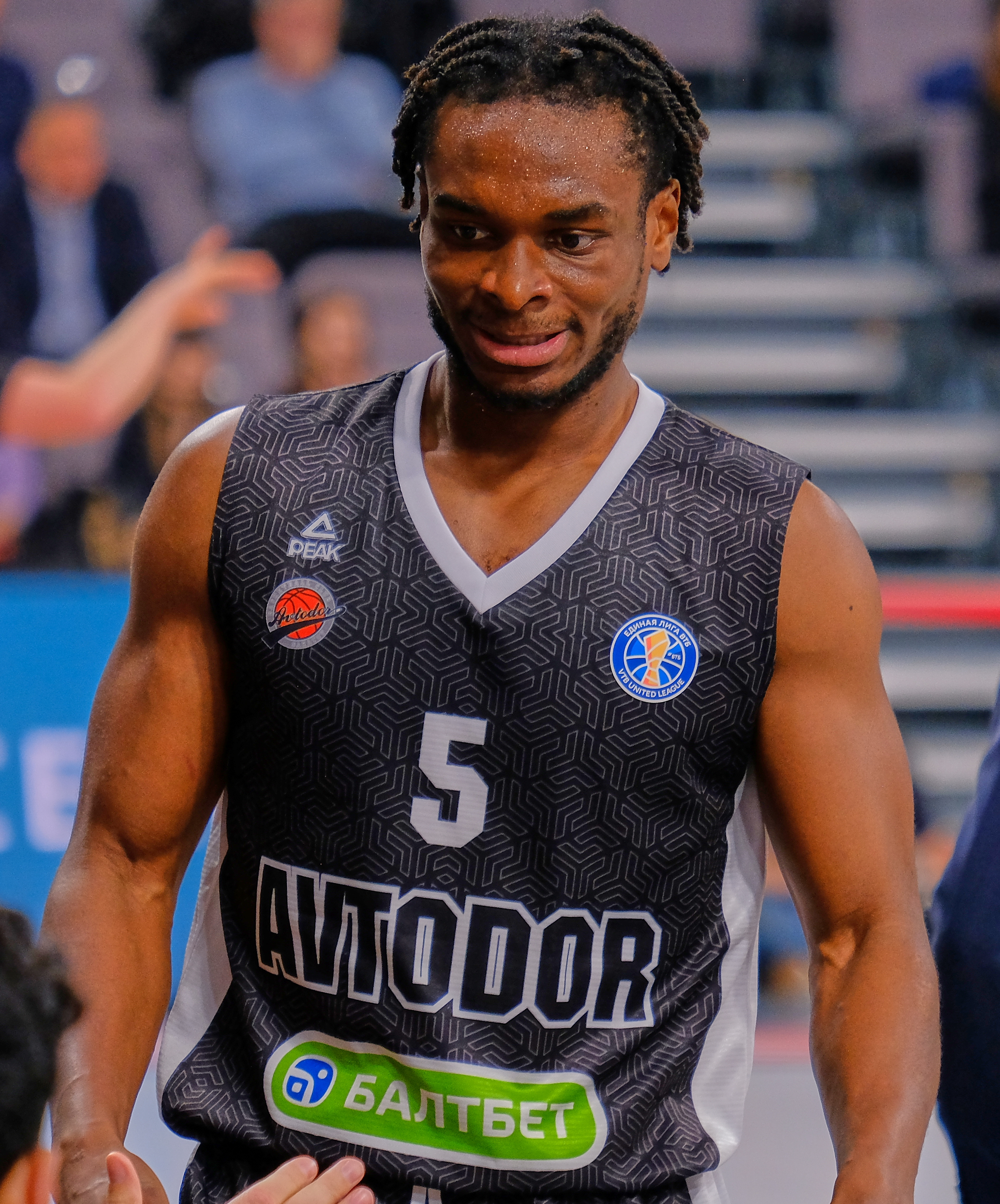
- Agada with Avtodor in 2024

No. 3 – Obradoiro CAB
- Position: Point guard
- League: Liga ACB

Personal information
- Born: August 31, 1994 (age 32) Lafia, Nigeria
- Listed height: 6 ft 4 in (1.93 m)
- Listed weight: 209 lb (95 kg)

Career information
- High school: Assumption (Burlington, Ontario)
- College: Ottawa (2012–2017)
- NBA draft: 2016: undrafted
- Playing career: 2017–present

Career history
- 2017–2018: Prat
- 2018–2019: Hamilton Honey Badgers
- 2018–2020: Melilla
- 2020–2021: Hapoel Be'er Sheva
- 2021–2022: Melbourne United
- 2022–2024: Prometey
- 2023: Ottawa Blackjacks
- 2024–2025: Avtodor
- 2025: Al Ahli Tripoli
- 2025–2026: Força Lleida
- 2026–present: Obradoiro

Career highlights
- BAL champion (2025); All-BAL Defensive First Team (2025); Israeli Basketball League Top Scorer (2021); 2x U SPORTS Defensive Player of the Year (2016, 2017); 3x OUA First Team All-Star (2015, 2016, 2017); 2x OUA Defensive Player of the Year (2016, 2017); U SPORTS Second Team All-Canadian (2017); U SPORTS Championship Tournament All-Star (2014)

Caleb Apochi Agada (born 31 August 1994) is a Nigerian-Canadian professional basketball player for Obradoiro of the Liga ACB.

Born in Nigeria and raised in Canada, he represents the Nigerian national basketball team, and played at the 2021 Olympics. In 2020-21 he led the Israel Basketball Premier League in points per game and steals per game.

== Early life ==
Agada was born in Lafia, Nigeria, and moved to the Canadian city of Burlington, Ontario, at the age of six.

== College career ==
Agada played college basketball for the University of Ottawa Gee-Gees from 2012–2017.

He was awarded back-to-back national U SPORTS Defensive Player of the Year honours in 2015-16 and 2016-17. At the conference level, Agada was named an OUA First Team All-Star in three consecutive seasons from 2014 to 2017.

In the 2016–17 season, he averaged 14.9 points, 6.4 rebounds and 3.3 assists per game as a fifth-year senior, earning Second Team All-Canadian honours.

== Professional career ==
Agada started his career at the Spanish side Prat Joventud in 2017–18 season, he averaged 14.4 points, 4.5 rebounds and 3.3 assists. He moved to the Melilla Baloncesto in the 2018–19 season, averaging 12 points, 6.4 rebounds and 2.2 assists. He also played for the Canadian side Hamilton Honey Badgers in the Canadian Elite Basketball League where he played two games for the team averaging 10 points, 7.5 rebounds and 4 assists in the 2018–19 season. In the 2019–20 season, he averaged 14.7 points, 5.3 rebounds and 3.7 assists.

On 19 May 2020, he signed with Hapoel Be'er Sheva of the Israeli Basketball Premier League. Agada averaged 15 points, 6 rebounds, 3 assists and 2 steals per game. On 26 July, he exercised his option to stay with Hapoel Beer Sheva in the 2020-21 season. On 14 September, Agada was named player of the week after contributing 25 points, eight rebounds, and six assists in a win against Maccabi Rishon LeZion. In 2020-21 he led the Israel Basketball Premier League in points per game (22.9) and steals per game (2.4).

On 24 August 2021, Agada signed with Melbourne United for the 2021–22 NBL season.

On 10 July 2022, Agada signed with Prometey of the Latvian-Estonian Basketball League and EuroCup.

On 23 June 2023, Agada signed with the Ottawa BlackJacks of the Canadian Elite Basketball League, but was released on 3 July.

On 4 July 2023, Agada signed for a second stint with Prometey of the Latvian-Estonian Basketball League.

On 11 September 2024, Agada signed with the Avtodor of the VTB League ^{[27]}

In May 2025, Agada was on the roster of Al Ahli Tripoli in the 2025 BAL season. He helped them win their first BAL championship. Agada was also named to the BAL All-Defensive First Team, as he averaged 2.3 steals per game.

After playing the 2025–26 season for Força Lleida of the Liga ACB, Agada signed for Obradoiro on July 21, 2026.

== National team career ==
Agada had been previously called up to play for a Canadian national basketball team side. He was called up to play for the Nigerian national basketball team during the 2019 FIBA Basketball World Cup qualification games, during the February 23–24, 2019 qualifying window in Lagos, he averaged 4.3 points, 4.7 rebounds and 4.3 assists. He was invited for the Nigerian 2019 FIBA Basketball World Cup preliminary squad but he didn't make the final list of players. In 2021, he represented Nigeria at the Tokyo Olympics.
