= Tahjere McCall =

American basketball player (born 1994)

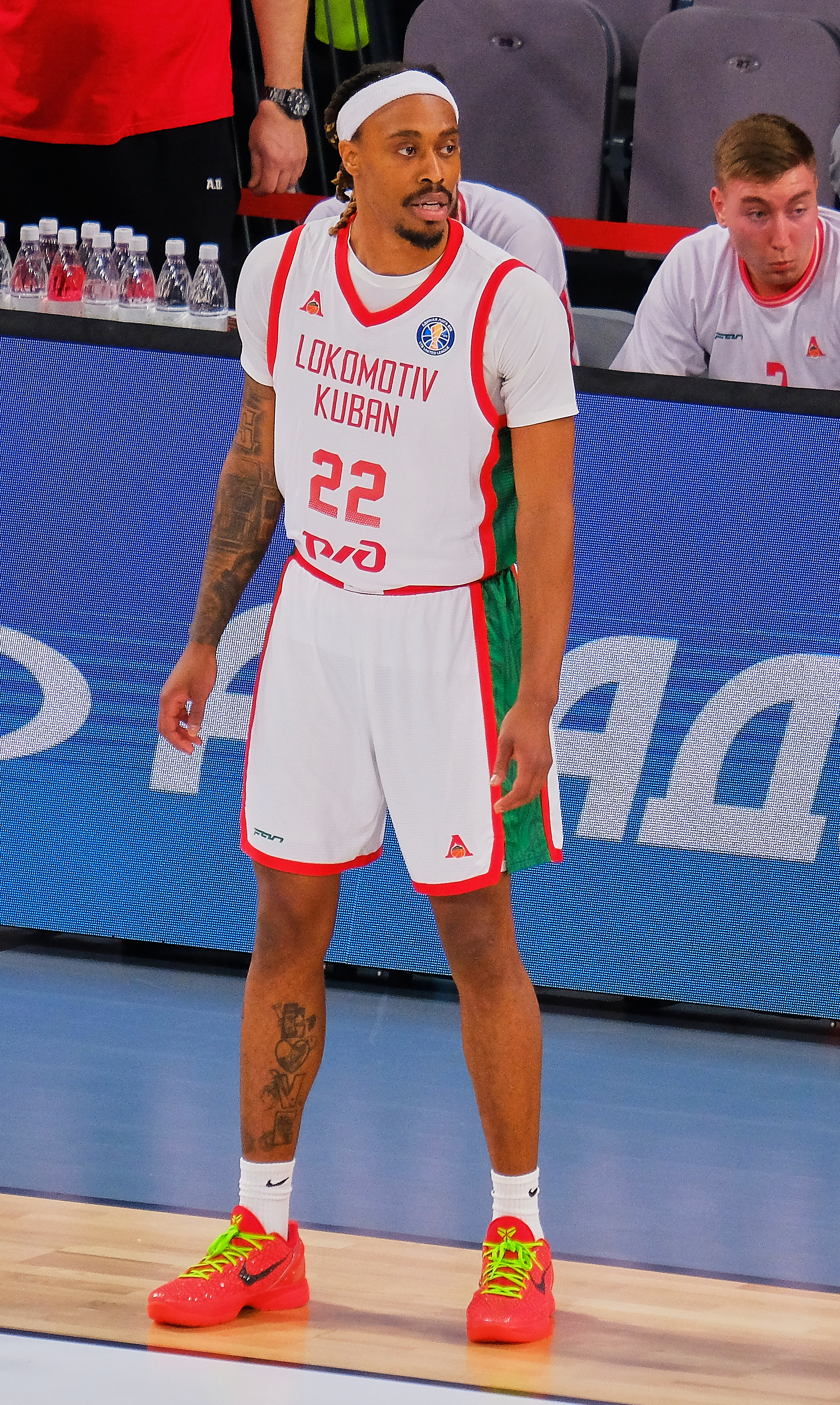
- McCall with the Lokomotiv Kuban in 2025

No. 22 – Guangzhou Loong Lions
- Position: Shooting guard
- League: CBA

Personal information
- Born: August 17, 1994 (age 32) Philadelphia, Pennsylvania, U.S.
- Listed height: 6 ft 4 in (1.93 m)
- Listed weight: 195 lb (88 kg)

Career information
- High school: Carver (Philadelphia, Pennsylvania)
- College: Niagara (2012–2014); Tennessee State (2015–2017)
- NBA draft: 2017: undrafted
- Playing career: 2017–present

Career history
- 2017–2019: Long Island Nets
- 2019: Brooklyn Nets
- 2019–2020: College Park Skyhawks
- 2021: Lakeland Magic
- 2021: Orléans Loiret Basket
- 2021–2024: Cairns Taipans
- 2022: Otago Nuggets
- 2023: Fos Provence Basket
- 2024: Hapoel Holon
- 2024–2025: Guangzhou Loong Lions
- 2025: Lokomotiv Kuban
- 2025–2026: Guangdong Southern Tigers
- 2026–present: Guangzhou Loong Lions

Career highlights
- NBA G League champion (2021); NBA G League All-Defensive Team (2021); 2× First-team All-OVC (2016, 2017); 2× OVC Defensive Player of the Year (2016, 2017)
- Stats at NBA.com
- Stats at Basketball Reference

Tahjere McCall (born August 17, 1994) is an American professional basketball player for Guangzhou Loong Lions of the Chinese Basketball Association (CBA). He played college basketball for the Niagara Purple Eagles and Tennessee State Tigers.

== Early life ==
McCall was born in Philadelphia, Pennsylvania. His father is a locomotive engineer and his mother rehabilitates crack cocaine addicts.

McCall attended Carver High School where he did not play on the basketball team until his junior season. He was preparing to play NCAA Division II basketball at Holy Family University when Niagara University presented him with a scholarship offer.

== College career ==
McCall began his college basketball career with the Niagara Purple Eagles. He served as a starter during his freshman season under head coach Joe Mihalich in 2012–13. McCall was moved to a bench role for his sophomore season by new head coach Chris Casey. He chose to transfer from the team at the end of the season and joined the Tennessee State Tigers under head coach Dana Ford. Ford discovered him through a recommendation from Anthony Mason whose son, Antoine, played alongside McCall at Niagara. McCall was selected as the Ohio Valley Conference (OVC) Defensive Player of the Year and earned All-OVC honors during his two seasons at Tennessee State.

== Professional career ==
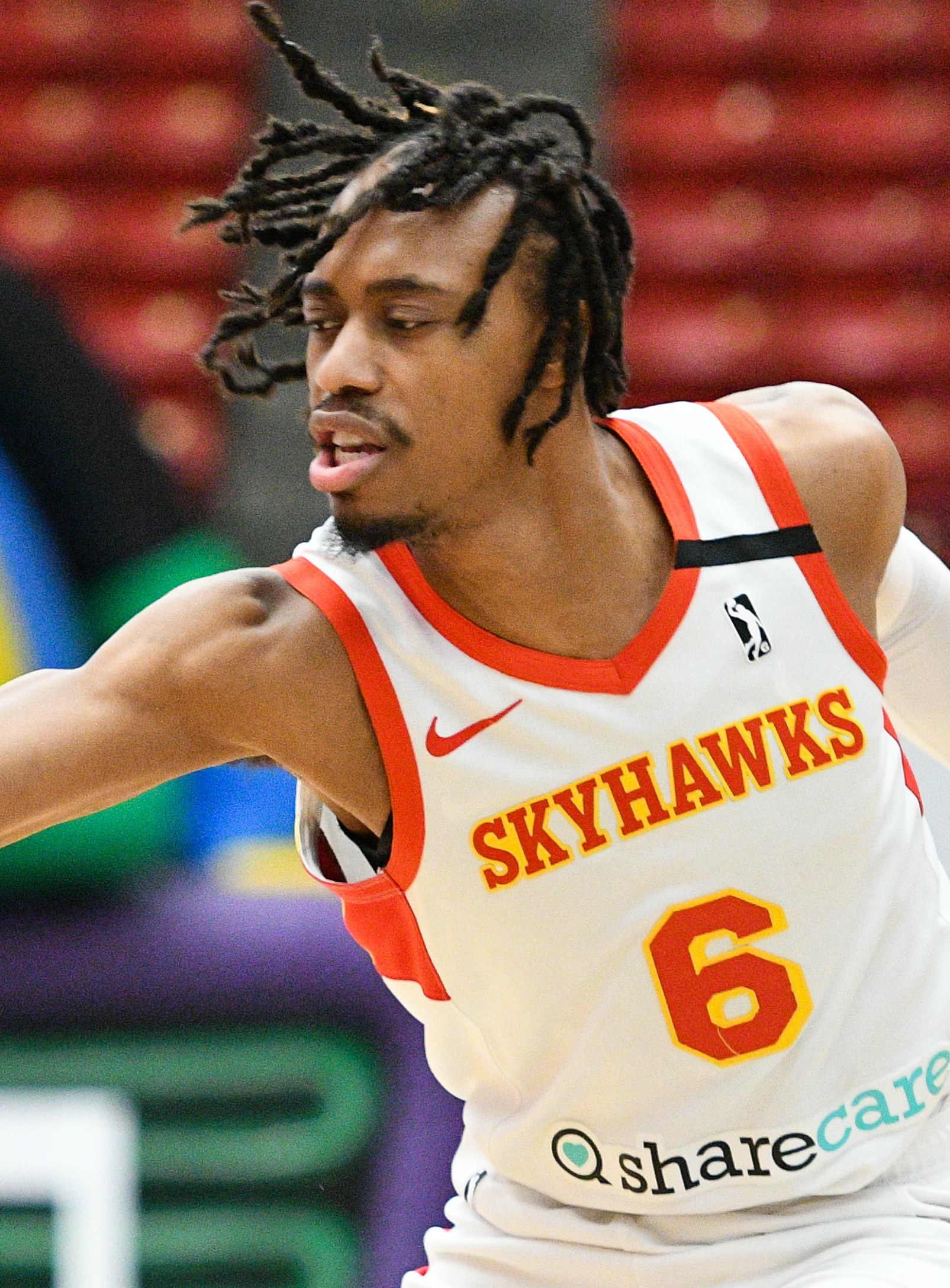
McCall with the College Park Skyhawks in 2020

After going undrafted in 2017 NBA draft, McCall joined the Brooklyn Nets for the 2017 NBA Summer League and would join them for training camp. McCall played two seasons with the Nets NBA G League affiliate in Long Island. On February 26, 2019, he signed a 10-day contract with the Brooklyn Nets. McCall re-joined the Long Island Nets after the conclusion of his 10-day contract with the Brooklyn Nets.

On September 20, 2019, McCall signed an Exhibit 10 contract with the Atlanta Hawks. On October 18, 2019, the Hawks waived McCall. He was then added to the roster of the Hawks’ G League affiliate, the College Park Skyhawks. On December 27, 2019, McCall had 28 points, six rebounds, five assists, three steals and one block in a win against the Delaware Blue Coats. McCall had two triple-doubles. He averaged 12.7 points on 46 percent shooting, 4.7 assists, 1.9 steals, and 6.1 rebounds per game.

On January 11, 2021, McCall was selected by the Lakeland Magic as the 5th overall pick of the month's 2021 NBA G League draft and averaged 11.3 points, 7.1 rebounds and 3.1 assists through the season.

On March 29, 2021, McCall signed with Orléans Loiret Basket of the French Jeep Élite.

On August 6, 2021, McCall signed with the Cairns Taipans for the 2021–22 NBL season.

On April 23, 2022, McCall signed with the Otago Nuggets for the 2022 New Zealand NBL season. He left the team in mid June after being invited to an NBA summer training camp.

On May 31, 2022, McCall re-signed with the Taipans on a two-year deal. Following the 2022–23 NBL season, he joined Fos Provence Basket of the LNB Pro A. On December 9, 2023, he had 19 points and 15 assists in a 116–101 win over the Adelaide 36ers. Following the 2023–24 NBL season, he joined Hapoel Holon in Israel.

On November 26, 2024, McCall signed with the Guangzhou Loong Lions of the Chinese Basketball Association.

On February 7, 2025, McCall signed with the Lokomotiv Kuban of the VTB United League.

On November 16, 2025, Tahjere signed with Guangdong Southern Tigers of the Chinese Basketball Association (CBA).

== Career statistics ==
Legend
GP	Games played	GS	Games started	MPG	Minutes per game
FG%	Field goal percentage	3P%	3-point field goal percentage	FT%	Free throw percentage
RPG	Rebounds per game	APG	Assists per game	SPG	Steals per game
BPG	Blocks per game	PPG	Points per game	**Bold**	Career high

=== NBA ===
==== Regular season ====
Year	Team	GP	GS	MPG	FG%	3P%	FT%	RPG	APG	SPG	BPG	PPG
2018–19	Brooklyn	1	0	8.0	.667	.000	.000	1.0	0.0	0.0	0.0	4.0

=== College ===
Year	Team	GP	GS	MPG	FG%	3P%	FT%	RPG	APG	SPG	BPG	PPG
2012–13	Niagara	**32**	23	19.8	.369	.000	.436	3.3	2.4	1.2	.0	4.0
2013–14	Niagara	27	14	22.7	.413	.083	.734	3.0	2.0	1.3	.3	7.5
2015–16	Tennessee State	31	**28**	30.1	**.455**	**.278**	**.756**	**5.1**	3.0	2.3	.4	**14.6**
2016–17	Tennessee State	27	27	**32.1**	.435	.243	.637	5.0	**5.1**	**2.8**	**.5**	14.3
Career		117	92	26.0	.427	.230	.677	4.1	3.1	1.9	.3	10.0

== Personal life ==
McCall's first child was born in the United States in October 2023.
