= Will Magnay =

Australian basketball player (born 1998)

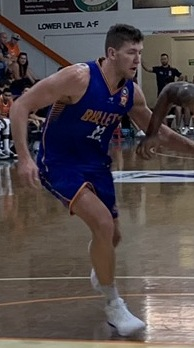
- Magnay with the Brisbane Bullets in 2019

No. 22 – Tasmania JackJumpers
- Position: Center / power forward
- League: NBL

Personal information
- Born: 10 June 1998 (age 28) Brisbane, Queensland, Australia
- Listed height: 208 cm (6 ft 10 in)
- Listed weight: 111 kg (245 lb)

Career information
- High school: Nudgee College (Brisbane, Queensland)
- College: Tulsa (2016–2017)
- NBA draft: 2018: undrafted
- Playing career: 2016–present

Career history
- 2016: BA Centre of Excellence
- 2017–2020: Brisbane Bullets
- 2018: Southern Districts Spartans
- 2019: Brisbane Capitals
- 2020–2021: New Orleans Pelicans
- 2021: →Erie BayHawks
- 2021: Perth Wildcats
- 2021–present: Tasmania JackJumpers
- 2023: Obradoiro CAB
- 2024: Gold Coast Rollers
- 2025: Mersin MSK

Career highlights
- NBL champion (2024); NBL Most Improved Player (2020); QBL champion (2019)
- Stats at NBA.com
- Stats at Basketball Reference
Medals
Men's basketball
Representing Australia
FIBA Asia Cup
Gold medal – first place	2025 Saudi Arabia

Will Scott Magnay (born 10 June 1998) is an Australian professional basketball player for the Tasmania JackJumpers of the National Basketball League (NBL). He played one season of college basketball for the Tulsa Golden Hurricane.

== Early life ==
Magnay was born in Brisbane, Queensland, where he attended Nudgee College. He played for the Northside Wizards as a junior. He moved to the Australian Institute of Sport in Canberra, where he played for the BA Centre of Excellence in the South East Australian Basketball League in 2016.

== College career ==
Magnay played college basketball for the Tulsa Golden Hurricane during the 2016–17 season. He averaged 3.9 points and 3 rebounds in 32 games played.

== Professional career ==
=== NBL ===
In October 2017, Magnay left the Tulsa Golden Hurricane program and signed a three-year deal with his hometown team, the Brisbane Bullets of the National Basketball League (NBL). He spent the 2017–18 NBL season as a development player. For the 2018–19 NBL season, Magnay was elevated to a fully-rostered player.

Magnay had a breakout year during the 2019–20 NBL season that saw him enter the Bullets' starting line-up and receive attention from National Basketball Association (NBA) scouts. He was subsequently named the NBL Most Improved Player for the 2019–20 season and initially re-signed with the Bullets on a two-year contract.

On 6 May 2021, following an NBA stint, Magnay signed with the Perth Wildcats for the rest of the 2020–21 NBL season. He averaged 4.7 points, 2.9 rebounds and 1.7 assists per game in 15 games played with the Wildcats.

On 12 July 2021, Magnay signed a one-year deal with the Tasmania JackJumpers, a new club entering the NBL for the first time in 2021–22. He was limited to 11 games in 2021–22 due to a knee injury. He subsequently re-signed with the JackJumpers on a two-year deal on 21 April 2022.

Magnay missed the start of the 2023–24 NBL season due to a foot injury. He went on to help the JackJumpers win their maiden NBL championship with a 3–2 grand final series victory over Melbourne United,

On 10 March 2024, Magnay re-signed with the JackJumpers on a two-year deal. On 19 December 2024, he was ruled out for six to eight weeks after suffering a fractured toe in practice.

Magnay was named JackJumpers captain for the 2025–26 NBL season. On 12 November 2025, he was sidelined due to a knee injury. On 21 January 2026, he was ruled out for the rest of the season with an acute fracture of the second toe on his left foot. Over his first five seasons for the JackJumpers, he played just 56 per cent all of games.

On 12 May 2026, Magnay re-signed with the JackJumpers on a two-year deal. He was chosen as team captain for a second season.

=== NBA ===
On 2 December 2020, Magnay signed a two-way contract with the New Orleans Pelicans and their NBA G League affiliate, the Erie BayHawks. He played 10 games for the BayHawks in February 2021 during the G League hub season. He made his NBA debut on 23 March 2021 against the Los Angeles Lakers, going scoreless over the final three minutes of the game. On 12 April 2021, he was waived by the Pelicans.

In July 2025, Magnay joined the Memphis Grizzlies for the 2025 NBA Summer League.

=== Europe ===
In February 2023, Magnay joined Spanish club Obradoiro CAB of the Liga ACB for the rest of the 2022–23 season.

On 9 March 2025, Magnay signed with Mersin MSK of the Basketbol Süper Ligi (BSL) for the rest of the 2024–25 season.

=== State leagues ===
Magnay played for the Southern Districts Spartans of the Queensland Basketball League (QBL) during the 2018 season. In 2019, he helped the Brisbane Capitals win the QBL championship.

Magnay joined the Gold Coast Rollers of the NBL1 North for the 2024 season. He appeared in four games for the Rollers.

== National team career ==
In July 2024, Magnay was named in the Australian Boomers' final squad for the Paris Olympics.

In July 2025, Magnay was named in the Boomers squad in the lead up to the 2025 FIBA Asia Cup in Saudi Arabia. He was named captain of the team for the tournament.

In October 2025, Magnay was named in the Boomers squad for the first window of the FIBA Basketball World Cup 2027 Asian Qualifiers. He was later replaced in the squad due to injury.

== Career statistics ==
Legend
GP	Games played	GS	Games started	MPG	Minutes per game
FG%	Field goal percentage	3P%	3-point field goal percentage	FT%	Free throw percentage
RPG	Rebounds per game	APG	Assists per game	SPG	Steals per game
BPG	Blocks per game	PPG	Points per game	**Bold**	Career high

=== NBA ===
==== Regular season ====
Year	Team	GP	GS	MPG	FG%	3P%	FT%	RPG	APG	SPG	BPG	PPG
2020–21	New Orleans	1	0	3.0	.000	.000	–	.0	.0	.0	.0	.0
Career		1	0	3.0	.000	.000	–	.0	.0	.0	.0	.0

=== College ===
Year	Team	GP	GS	MPG	FG%	3P%	FT%	RPG	APG	SPG	BPG	PPG
2016–17	Tulsa	32	12	14.0	.578	.000	.571	3.0	0.3	0.1	0.9	3.9

== Personal life ==
Magnay's older brother, Campbell, is a rugby player.
