= 2021 NBL pre-season =

Pre-season basketball tournament

2021 NBL Blitz logo

The pre-season of the 2021–22 NBL season, the 44th season of Australia's National Basketball League, ran from 13 November 2021 to 28 November 2021.

== Games ==
=== 2021 NBL Blitz ===
The NBL Blitz is an annual pre-season tournament featuring all NBL teams. This season games were held in New South Wales, Tasmania, and Victoria from the 13th to the 28th of November 2021. The league was separated into two conferences, with New South Wales and Victoria-based teams competing in Melbourne and Wollongong and all other teams competing in Hobart, Ulverstone and Launceston.

==== New South Wales/Victoria conference ====
13 November 2021	Melbourne United	90–84	New Zealand Breakers	Melbourne Sports and Aquatic Centre, Melbourne
17:30	Scoring by quarter: 25–23, 15–20, 23–19, 27–22
Kayo Freebies	Pts: Lual-Acuil 37; Rebs: Lual-Acuil 11; Asts: Dellavedova 6	boxscore report	Pts: Delany 20; Rebs: Timmins 7 Asts: Siva 3	Attendance: closed event Referees: Daniel Battye, Mitch Hare, Elliot Green

13 November 2021	Sydney Kings	75–81	South East Melbourne Phoenix	Melbourne Sports and Aquatic Centre, Melbourne
19:30	Scoring by quarter: 13–29, 16–17, 25–22, 21–13
Kayo Freebies	Pts: Martin 15; Rebs: Martin, Vodanovich 9 Asts: Cooks 3	boxscore report	Pts: Creek 17; Rebs: Broekhoff 10; Asts: Le'afa 4	Attendance: closed event Referees: Chris Reid, Todd Spain, Jack Taylor

15 November 2021	South East Melbourne Phoenix	112–116(OT)	Illawarra Hawks	Melbourne Sports and Aquatic Centre, Melbourne
17:30	Scoring by quarter: 26–27, 30–24, 25–28, 19–21, Overtime: 12–16
Kayo Freebies	Pts: Te Rangi 18; Rebs: Zhou 12; Asts: Adnam 12	boxscore report	Pts: Jessup 27; Rebs: Cleveland, Coenraad, H. Froling, S. Froling, Jessup 5 Asts: Rathan-Mayes 7	Attendance: closed event Referees: Chris Reid, Elliot Green, Jason Kelly

15 November 2021	Sydney Kings	80–75	Melbourne United	Melbourne Sports and Aquatic Centre, Melbourne
19:30	Scoring by quarter: 25–15, 14–22, 22–12, 19–26
Kayo Freebies	Pts: Glover 18; Rebs: Cooks 14; Asts: Bayles, Cooks 4	boxscore report	Pts: Lual-Acuil 13; Rebs: Peatling 8 Asts: Agada 4	Attendance: closed event Referees: Mitch Hare, Damian Lyons, David Baddock

18 November 2021	New Zealand Breakers	97–93	Sydney Kings	Melbourne Sports and Aquatic Centre, Melbourne
19:30	Scoring by quarter: 20–26, 25–23, 21–22, 31–22
Kayo Freebies	Pts: Martin 23; Rebs: Siva 6 Asts: Martin, Siva 7	boxscore report	Pts: Adams 16; Rebs: Cooks 11; Asts: Adams, Cooks 3	Attendance: closed event Referees: Chris Reid, Daniel Battye, Damian Lyons

20 November 2021	New Zealand Breakers	92–90	South East Melbourne Phoenix	Melbourne Sports and Aquatic Centre, Melbourne
17:30	Scoring by quarter: 24–18, 15–22, 27–24, 26–26
Kayo Freebies	Pts: Besson 24; Rebs: Wetzell 12; Asts: McDowell-White, Siva 4	boxscore report	Pts: Adnam 21; Rebs: Zhou 2 Asts: Munford 4	Attendance: closed event Referees: Chris Reid, Mitch Hare, Jack Taylor

20 November 2021	Melbourne United	90–97	Illawarra Hawks	Melbourne Sports and Aquatic Centre, Melbourne
19:30	Scoring by quarter: 28–30, 33–22, 10–23, 19–22
Kayo Freebies	Pts: Lual-Acuil 20; Rebs: Lual-Acuil 9 Asts: Dellavedova 6	boxscore report	Pts: Cleveland 21; Rebs: Reath 6 Asts: Harvey, Rathan-Mayes (3)	Attendance: closed event Referees: Damian Lyons, Daniel Battye, David Baddock

25 November 2021	Illawarra Hawks	vs.	New Zealand Breakers	WIN Entertainment Centre, Wollongong
cancelled
		report

27 November 2021	Illawarra Hawks	vs.	Sydney Kings	WIN Entertainment Centre, Wollongong
cancelled
		report

28 November 2021	South East Melbourne Phoenix	89–87	Melbourne United	Melbourne Sports Centre, Melbourne
15:00	Scoring by quarter: 20–25, 24–19, 26–25, 19–18
Kayo Freebies	Pts: Broekhoff 21; Rebs: Broekhoff 7 Asts: Le'Afa, Munford 4	boxscore report	Pts: Goulding 26; Rebs: Lual-Acuil 10; Asts: Dellavedova 9	Attendance: closed event Referees: Mitch Hare, Damian Lyons, Jon Chapman

==== Tasmania conference ====
14 November 2021	Tasmania JackJumpers	79–89	Brisbane Bullets	MyState Bank Arena, Hobart
13:00	Scoring by quarter: 21–18, 17–21, 24–28, 17–22
Kayo Freebies	Pts: Adams 18; Rebs: McDaniel, McVeigh 6 Asts: Magette 5	boxscore report	Pts: Sobey 17; Rebs: Franks, Sobey 7 Asts: Patterson 6	Attendance: 4,500; Referees: Michael Aylen, Jacqui Dover, James Grigoul

14 November 2021	Cairns Taipans	87–91(OT)	Adelaide 36ers	MyState Bank Arena, Hobart
15:00	Scoring by quarter: 17–17, 19–25, 20–15, 23–22, Overtime: 8–12
Kayo Freebies	Pts: Deng, Sotto 46; Rebs: Sotto 11; Asts: Machado 5	boxscore report	Pts: Johnson 33; Rebs: Bairstow 11; Asts: Dech, McCarron 4	Attendance: 4,500; Referees: not available

16 November 2021	Perth Wildcats	56–63	Adelaide 36ers	MyState Bank Arena, Hobart
17:30	Scoring by quarter: 12–17, 16–19, 20–15, 8–12
Kayo Freebies	Pts: Law, Wagstaff 11; Rebs: Hodgson, Law 8 Asts: Cotton, Wagstaff 3	boxscore report	Pts: Hannahs, King 11; Rebs: Bairstow, Humphries 7 Asts: McCarron 4	Attendance: not available Referees: not available

16 November 2021	Cairns Taipans	66–81	Tasmania JackJumpers	MyState Bank Arena, Hobart
19:30	Scoring by quarter: 16–21, 22–23, 13–15, 15–22
Kayo Freebies	Pts: Sotto 45; Rebs: Sotto 33; Asts: Machado 9	boxscore report	Pts: Adams 15; Rebs: Magette 6 Asts: Magette 4	Attendance: not available Referees: not available

19 November 2021	Brisbane Bullets	100–90	Perth Wildcats	Ulverstone Sports & Leisure Centre, Ulverstone
19:30	Scoring by quarter: 22–22, 33–25, 27–23, 18–20
Kayo Freebies	Pts: Digbeu, Harrison, Patterson 16; Rebs: Harrison 9 Asts: Patterson 7	boxscore report	Pts: Cotton 22; Rebs: Law 6 Asts: Cotton, Law 5	Attendance: not available Referees: Nathan Durant, Ruben Woolcock, Mark Grist

21 November 2021	Perth Wildcats	96–87	Cairns Taipans	Ulverstone Sports & Leisure Centre, Ulverstone
13:00	Scoring by quarter: 25–24, 25–25, 22–24, 24–14
Kayo Freebies	Pts: Law 28; Rebs: Law 12; Asts: Travers 5	boxscore report	Pts: Jawai 21; Rebs: McCall 13; Asts: Djeric, Machado 7	Attendance: not available Referees: Mark Mill, Ruben Woolcock, James Griguol

21 November 2021	Adelaide 36ers	82–80	Tasmania JackJumpers	Ulverstone Sports & Leisure Centre, Ulverstone
15:00	Scoring by quarter: 12–33, 21–17, 22–11, 27–19
Kayo Freebies	Pts: Hannahs 19; Rebs: Humphries 6 Asts: McCarron 12	boxscore report	Pts: Steindl 17; Rebs: McDaniel, Magnay 4 Asts: Magette 8	Attendance: not available Referees: Michael Aylen, Mark Grist, Travis Stewart

24 November 2021	Cairns Taipans	86–94	Brisbane Bullets	Ulverstone Sports & Leisure Centre, Ulverstone
17:30	Scoring by quarter: 24–25, 27–21, 16–24, 19–24
Kayo Freebies	Pts: McCall 17; Rebs: Pinder 10; Asts: Machado, Noi 5	boxscore report	Pts: Sobey 27; Rebs: Franks 8 Asts: Sobey 8	Attendance: not available Referees: Mark Mill, Craig Copes, Alex McEwan

24 November 2021	Perth Wildcats	98–68	Tasmania JackJumpers	Ulverstone Sports & Leisure Centre, Ulverstone
19:30	Scoring by quarter: 23–21, 25–17, 22–15, 28–15
Kayo Freebies	Pts: Cotton 18; Rebs: Law 9 Asts: Cotton 6	boxscore report	Pts: Adams 17; Rebs: Magnay 5 Asts: Magette 7	Attendance: not available Referees: not available

26 November 2021	Tasmania JackJumpers	83–68	Cairns Taipans	Elphin Sports Centre, Launceston
17:30	Scoring by quarter: 22–21, 17–15, 21–17, 23–15
Kayo Freebies	Pts: Magette 26; Rebs: Magnay 9 Asts: Magette 6	boxscore report	Pts: Noi 12; Rebs: Zimmerman 8 Asts: McCall 5	Attendance: not available Referees: Ruben Woolcock, Jacqui Dover, Hugh Starkey
Note: Does not count towards Blitz ladder

26 November 2021	Adelaide 36ers	97–93	Perth Wildcats	Elphin Sports Centre, Launceston
19:30	Scoring by quarter: 29–27, 23–34, 18–18, 27–14
Kayo Freebies	Pts: Hannahs, Withers 19; Rebs: Johnson 6 Asts: McCarron 9	boxscore report	Pts: Law 24; Rebs: Hayes-Brown 11; Asts: Zunic 5	Attendance: not available Referees: not available
Note: Does not count towards Blitz ladder

28 November 2021	Brisbane Bullets	67–72	Adelaide 36ers	MyState Bank Arena, Hobart
13:00	Scoring by quarter: 17–10, 19–27, 16–13, 15–22
Kayo Freebies	Pts: Krebs 15; Rebs: Deng, Salt 9 Asts: Cadee 3	boxscore report	Pts: Johnson 16; Rebs: Marshall 12; Asts: McCarron 8	Attendance: not available Referees: Craig Copes, Alex McEwan, Jacqui Dover

== Pre-season ladder ==
2021–22 NBL pre-season ladder
Ladder
Information

Pos.	Nat.	Name	Pld.	W.	L.	Last 5	Streak	Home	Away	For	Against	Pts %	Win %
1	(Australia)	Illawarra	2	2	0	2–0	W2	0–0	2–0	213	202	105.45%	100.00%
2	(Australia)	Adelaide	5	5	0	5–0	W5	2–0	3–0	401	383	104.70%	100.00%
3	(Australia)	Brisbane	4	3	1	3–1	L1	1–1	2–0	350	327	107.03%	75.00%
4	(New Zealand)	New Zealand	3	2	1	2–1	W2	2–0	0–1	273	273	100.00%	66.67%
5	(Australia)	S.E. Melbourne	4	2	2	2–2	W1	1–0	1–2	376	375	100.27%	50.00%
6	(Australia)	Perth	5	2	3	2–3	L1	2–1	0–2	433	415	104.34%	40.00%
7	(Australia)	Tasmania (NT)	5	2	3	2–3	W1	1–1	1–2	391	403	97.02%	40.00%
8	(Australia)	Sydney	3	1	2	1–2	L1	1–1	0–1	248	253	98.02%	33.33%
9	(Australia)	Melbourne (RC)	4	1	3	1–3	L3	1–1	0–2	342	350	97.71%	25.00%
10	(Australia)	Cairns	5	0	5	0–5	L5	0–3	0–2	394	447	88.14%	0.00%

Total Rounds
2 weeks

Total Games
21 games

Legend
- (NT) New Team
- (RC) Reigning Champion

- Updated: 28 November 2021

=== NBL Blitz ladder ===
2021 NBL Blitz ladder
Ladder
Information

Pos.	Nat.	Name	Pld.	W.	L.	QW	Last 5	Streak	For	Against	Pts %	Win %	Pts.
1	(Australia)	Adelaide	4	4	0	9.5	4–0	W4	308	290	106.21%	100.00%	21.5
2	(Australia)	Brisbane (RC)	4	3	1	10.5	3–1	L1	350	327	107.03%	75.00%	19.5
3	(Australia)	Illawarra^{†}	2	2	0	6	2–0	W2	213	202	105.45%	100.00%	19
4	(Australia)	Perth	4	2	2	9	2–2	W2	340	318	106.92%	50.00%	15
5	(New Zealand)	New Zealand^{†}	3	2	1	5.5	2–1	W2	273	273	100.00%	66.67%	15
6	(Australia)	S.E. Melbourne	4	2	2	7.5	2–2	W1	376	375	100.27%	50.00%	13.5
7	(Australia)	Sydney^{†}	3	1	2	6	1–2	L1	248	253	98.02%	33.33%	12.5
8	(Australia)	Melbourne	4	1	3	7	1–3	L3	342	350	97.71%	25.00%	10
9	(Australia)	Tasmania (NT)	4	1	3	6	1–3	L2	308	335	91.94%	25.00%	9
10	(Australia)	Cairns	4	0	4	5	0–4	L4	326	362	90.06%	0.00%	5
^{†} Multiple games were cancelled due to NBL COVID-19 protocols. Teams were awarded 3.5 points per effected game.

Total Rounds
2 weeks

Total Games
19 games

Legend
- (NT) New Team
- (RC) Reigning Champion

- Updated: 28 November 2021
