= 2021–22 NBL regular season =

The regular season of the 2021–22 NBL season, the 44th season of the National Basketball League (Australia), started on 3 December 2021, with ten teams participating. It consisted of 140 games spread across 21 rounds, with the final game being played on 24 April 2022.

On 24 April 2022, Melbourne United claimed their 6th regular season championship.

== Games ==
=== Round 1 ===
3 December 2021	Tasmania JackJumpers	83–74(OT)	Brisbane Bullets	MyState Bank Arena, Hobart
19:30	Scoring by quarter: 27–19, 15–22, 14–12, 13–16, Overtime: 14–5
ESPN	Pts: Adams 20; Rebs: Magnay 10; Asts: Magette 6	boxscore report	Pts: Sobey 24; Rebs: Franks, Harrison 11; Asts: Patterson 6	Attendance: 4,738

3 December 2021	Perth Wildcats	85–73	Adelaide 36ers	RAC Arena, Perth
19:30	Scoring by quarter: 22–19, 25–24, 23–20, 15–10
ESPN	Pts: Law 37; Rebs: Majok 12; Asts: Cotton 5	boxscore report	Pts: Johnson 22; Rebs: Withers 11; Asts: McCarron 9	Attendance: 11,950

4 December 2021	South East Melbourne Phoenix	89–65	New Zealand Breakers	John Cain Arena, Melbourne
20:00	Scoring by quarter: 17–11, 27–12, 22–23, 23–19
ESPN	Pts: Munford 27; Rebs: Munford, Pineau 7 Asts: Munford 5	boxscore report	Pts: Delany 18; Rebs: Delany 9 Asts: Martin 4	Attendance: 3,453

5 December 2021	Adelaide 36ers	71–81	Illawarra Hawks	Adelaide Entertainment Centre, Adelaide
12:30	Scoring by quarter: 16–13, 19–27, 15–26, 21–15
10 Peach	Pts: Bairstow 15; Rebs: Withers 13; Asts: Bairstow, McCarron 4	boxscore report	Pts: Reath 18; Rebs: Reath 9 Asts: Harvey 6	Attendance: 4,802

5 December 2021	Sydney Kings	79–74	Melbourne United	Qudos Bank Arena, Sydney
15:00	Scoring by quarter: 17–20, 22–10, 25–22, 15–22
10 Peach	Pts: Adams 15; Rebs: Adams, Martin 8 Asts: Cooks 5	boxscore report	Pts: Lual-Acuil 12; Rebs: Peatling 9 Asts: Dellavedova 6	Attendance: 8,632

5 December 2021	Perth Wildcats	90–67	Cairns Taipans	RAC Arena, Perth
15:30	Scoring by quarter: 16–21, 23–13, 31–20, 20–13
ESPN	Pts: Cotton 31; Rebs: Travers 13; Asts: Cotton 5	boxscore report	Pts: Noi 17; Rebs: Zimmerman 14; Asts: Machado 6	Attendance: 10,800

=== Round 2 ===
9 December 2021	Tasmania JackJumpers	80–83	Adelaide 36ers	MyState Bank Arena, Hobart
19:30	Scoring by quarter: 22–25, 12–17, 22–24, 24–17
ESPN	Pts: Steindl 22; Rebs: McVeigh 6 Asts: Magette 8	boxscore report	Pts: Hannahs 15; Rebs: Humphries, McCarron 6 Asts: Hannahs 4	Attendance: 4,738

10 December 2021	South East Melbourne Phoenix	95–88	New Zealand Breakers	John Cain Arena, Melbourne
19:30	Scoring by quarter: 35–22, 13–23, 22–22, 25–21
ESPN	Pts: Creek 36; Rebs: Gliddon 6 Asts: Munford 6	boxscore report	Pts: Delany 26; Rebs: Besson 8 Asts: McDowell-White 8	Attendance: 3,752

11 December 2021	Sydney Kings	84–92	Illawarra Hawks	Qudos Bank Arena, Sydney
17:30	Scoring by quarter: 25–24, 18–22, 17–21, 24–25
ESPN	Pts: Glover 16; Rebs: Cooks 11; Asts: Bruce, Cooks 5	boxscore report	Pts: Reath 27; Rebs: Froling 13; Asts: Jessup, Rathan-Mayes 4	Attendance: 6,212

11 December 2021	Cairns Taipans	69–62	Tasmania JackJumpers	Cairns Convention Centre, Cairns
19:00	Scoring by quarter: 22–21, 6–13, 19–6, 22–22
ESPN	Pts: McCall 20; Rebs: Zimmerman 12; Asts: McCall 5	boxscore report	Pts: Magette 19; Rebs: McDaniel 8 Asts: Magette 5	Attendance: 4,015

12 December 2021	Melbourne United	86–94	South East Melbourne Phoenix	John Cain Arena, Melbourne
13:00	Scoring by quarter: 12–27, 25–21, 32–22, 17–24
10 Peach	Pts: Dellavedova 19; Rebs: Dellavedova, Newley 9 Asts: Dellavedova 5	boxscore report	Pts: Zhou 22; Rebs: Zhou 10; Asts: Creek, Le'afa 5	Attendance: 6,361

12 December 2021	Adelaide 36ers	98–85	New Zealand Breakers	Adelaide Entertainment Centre, Adelaide
14:30	Scoring by quarter: 15–28, 27–31, 27–12, 29–14
10 Peach	Pts: Hannahs 25; Rebs: McCarron 13; Asts: McCarron 6	boxscore report	Pts: McDowell-White 27; Rebs: Loe 6 Asts: McDowell-White 7	Attendance: 4,445

12 December 2021	Perth Wildcats	94–97(2OT)	Brisbane Bullets	RAC Arena, Perth
14:30	Scoring by quarter: 22–17, 17–26, 18–15, 19–18, Overtime: 8–8, 10–13
ESPN	Pts: Law 29; Rebs: Majok 14; Asts: Cotton, Travers 5	boxscore report	Pts: Patterson 27; Rebs: Harrison 14; Asts: Cadee 7	Attendance: 11,295

=== Round 3 ===
16 December 2021	Melbourne United	89–47	Sydney Kings	John Cain Arena, Melbourne
19:30	Scoring by quarter: 34–5, 21–16, 18–15, 16–11
ESPN	Pts: Agada 21; Rebs: Lual-Acuil 8 Asts: Dellavedova 5	boxscore report	Pts: Cooks 12; Rebs: Cooks 6 Asts: Bayles 4	Attendance: 4,786

17 December 2021	Illawarra Hawks	97–96(2OT)	New Zealand Breakers	WIN Entertainment Centre, Wollongong
19:30	Scoring by quarter: 14–27, 25–14, 18–19, 20–17, Overtime: 7–7, 13–12
ESPN	Pts: Harvey 26; Rebs: Reath 13; Asts: Jessup 4	boxscore report	Pts: Wetzell 25; Rebs: Wetzell 17; Asts: Delany, McDowell-White 4	Attendance: 2,873

17 December 2021	Perth Wildcats	83–70	Brisbane Bullets	RAC Arena, Perth
19:30	Scoring by quarter: 14–19, 22–17, 25–19, 22–15
ESPN	Pts: Cotton 29; Rebs: Law, Travers 9 Asts: Travers 4	boxscore	Pts: Franks 28; Rebs: Franks 9 Asts: Sobey 4	Attendance: 11,745

18 December 2021	Sydney Kings	84–73	South East Melbourne Phoenix	Qudos Bank Arena, Sydney
17:30	Scoring by quarter: 29–14, 14–17, 14–15, 27–27
ESPN	Pts: Cooks 19; Rebs: Martin 13; Asts: Bayles, Bruce, Cooks, Glover 2	boxscore report	Pts: Creek 22; Rebs: Zhou 13; Asts: Le'afa 4	Attendance: 6,379

18 December 2021	Cairns Taipans	93–67	Adelaide 36ers	Cairns Convention Centre, Cairns
19:00	Scoring by quarter: 31–20, 23–13, 23–10, 16–24
ESPN	Pts: Deng 23; Rebs: Zimmerman 9 Asts: McCall 10	boxscore report	Pts: Hannahs 20; Rebs: Humphries 10; Asts: McCarron 4	Attendance: 3,314

19 December 2021	Melbourne United	83–60	New Zealand Breakers	John Cain Arena, Melbourne
13:00	Scoring by quarter: 21–14, 13–17, 18–12, 31–17
10 Peach	Pts: Goulding 21; Rebs: Lual-Acuil 9 Asts: Dellavedova 7	boxscore report	Pts: Delany 14; Rebs: Delany 9 Asts: Delany, Martin 4	Attendance: 5,479

19 December 2021	Brisbane Bullets	96–92	Illawarra Hawks	Nissan Arena, Brisbane
14:00	Scoring by quarter: 30–20, 24–25, 21–22, 21–25
10 Peach	Pts: Sobey 17; Rebs: Harrison 8 Asts: Sobey 5	boxscore report	Pts: Froling, Reath 15; Rebs: Froling 11; Asts: Froling, Jessup 4	Attendance: 3,584

19 December 2021	Perth Wildcats	101–83	Tasmania JackJumpers	RAC Arena, Perth
15:30	Scoring by quarter: 21–15, 28–23, 25–21, 27–24
ESPN	Pts: Law 32; Rebs: Law 12; Asts: Cotton, White 6	boxscore report	Pts: Magette 17; Rebs: Magette 7 Asts: Magette 6	Attendance: 13,615

22 December 2021	Sydney Kings	83–71	Tasmania JackJumpers	Qudos Bank Arena, Sydney
19:30	Scoring by quarter: 17–20, 22–28, 15–15, 29–8
ESPN	Pts: Martin 24; Rebs: Martin 11; Asts: Bruce 5	boxscore report	Pts: Steindl 15; Rebs: Krslovic, Magnay 7 Asts: Krslovic, Magette 3	Attendance: 4,612

=== Round 4 ===
26 December 2021	Tasmania JackJumpers	84–75	New Zealand Breakers	MyState Bank Arena, Hobart
13:00	Scoring by quarter: 25–16, 25–23, 19–17, 15–19
10 Peach	Pts: Adams 21; Rebs: McDaniel, McVeigh 6 Asts: Magette 7	boxscore report	Pts: Martin 24; Rebs: Wetzell 10; Asts: Martin 8	Attendance: 4,623

26 December 2021	Sydney Kings	68–82	Melbourne United	Qudos Bank Arena, Sydney
15:00	Scoring by quarter: 26–24, 14–20, 19–22, 9–16
10 Peach	Pts: Martin 19; Rebs: Cooks 10; Asts: Cooks 4	boxscore report	Pts: Agada 24; Rebs: Agada 14; Asts: Dellavedova 4	Attendance: 4,725

=== Round 5 ===
31 December 2021	Cairns Taipans	78–84	Perth Wildcats	Cairns Convention Centre, Cairns
19:00	Scoring by quarter: 25–11, 22–33, 19–24, 12–16
ESPN	Pts: Deng 27; Rebs: Zimmerman 9 Asts: Kenny, Kuol, Noi 4	boxscore report	Pts: Cotton 29; Rebs: Majok 9 Asts: Cotton 6	Attendance: 4,339

1 January 2022	Tasmania JackJumpers	72–76	Melbourne United	MyState Bank Arena, Hobart
17:30	Scoring by quarter: 27–22, 16–22, 22–19, 7–13
ESPN	Pts: Adams 23; Rebs: McIntosh 6 Asts: Bairstow, Magette, Weeks 2	boxscore report	Pts: Lual-Acuil 19; Rebs: Agada 8 Asts: Dellavedova 5	Attendance: 4,685

=== Round 6 ===
9 January 2022	Brisbane Bullets	83–88	New Zealand Breakers	Nissan Arena, Brisbane
15:00	Scoring by quarter: 13–26, 23–19, 23–21, 24–22
10 Peach	Pts: Patterson 17; Rebs: Franks 9 Asts: Sobey 7	boxscore report	Pts: Wetzell 27; Rebs: Wetzell 8 Asts: Martin 8	Attendance: 2,925

=== Round 7 ===
13 January 2022	Illawarra Hawks	97–89	Sydney Kings	WIN Entertainment Centre, Wollongong
19:30	Scoring by quarter: 28–22, 21–26, 26–30, 22–11
ESPN	Pts: S.Froling 27; Rebs: S.Froling 10; Asts: Harvey 5	boxscore report	Pts: Martin 23; Rebs: Cooks 14; Asts: Adams 8	Attendance: 1,994
Note: Original date - 31 December 2021

14 January 2022	New Zealand Breakers	78–89	Melbourne United	MyState Bank Arena, Hobart
19:30	Scoring by quarter: 22–21, 17–17, 21–27, 18–24
ESPN	Pts: Martin 20; Rebs: Wetzell 9 Asts: Siva 5	boxscore report	Pts: Goulding 23; Rebs: Lual-Acuil 13; Asts: Dellavedova 5	Attendance: closed event

15 January 2022	Brisbane Bullets	100–84	South East Melbourne Phoenix	Nissan Arena, Brisbane
16:30	Scoring by quarter: 31–6, 26–23, 22–24, 21–31
ESPN	Pts: Sobey 18; Rebs: Franks 10; Asts: Patterson 8	boxscore report	Pts: Creek 19; Rebs: Creek 8 Asts: Munford 7	Attendance: 2,389

16 January 2022	Illawarra Hawks	84–88	Melbourne United	WIN Entertainment Centre, Wollongong
13:00	Scoring by quarter: 20–22, 22–25, 26–23, 16–18
10 Peach	Pts: Jessup 18; Rebs: S.Froling 13; Asts: Rathan-Mayes 5	boxscore report	Pts: Dellavedova 33; Rebs: Agada 15; Asts: Dellavedova 8	Attendance: 1,753
Note: Original date - 9 January 2022

16 January 2022	Sydney Kings	75–82	New Zealand Breakers	Qudos Bank Arena, Sydney
15:00	Scoring by quarter: 24–17, 10–13, 23–22, 18–30
10 Peach	Pts: Cooks 19; Rebs: Cooks 12; Asts: Bruce, Vasiljevic 4	boxscore report	Pts: Martin 22; Rebs: Delany 9 Asts: Siva 5	Attendance: 4,356

18 January 2022	Adelaide 36ers	87–74	Perth Wildcats	Adelaide Entertainment Centre, Adelaide
19:00	Scoring by quarter: 29–13, 26–21, 12–24, 20–16
ESPN	Pts: Johnson 21; Rebs: McCarron 12; Asts: McCarron 8	boxscore report	Pts: Law 16; Rebs: Law 14; Asts: Frazier II 4	Attendance: 4,758
Note: Original date - 28 December 2021

=== Round 8 ===
21 January 2022	Brisbane Bullets	96–87	Sydney Kings	Nissan Arena, Brisbane
18:30	Scoring by quarter: 15–31, 20–13, 30–28, 31–15
ESPN	Pts: Sobey 30; Rebs: Harrison 13; Asts: Cadee 5	boxscore report	Pts: Adams 33; Rebs: Martin 12; Asts: Adams 7	Attendance: 2,574

22 January 2022	Adelaide 36ers	78–97	Melbourne United	Adelaide Entertainment Centre, Adelaide
17:00	Scoring by quarter: 24–26, 20–25, 20–21, 14–25
ESPN	Pts: Bairstow 18; Rebs: McCarron 10; Asts: McCarron 7	boxscore report	Pts: Goulding, Lual-Acuil 18; Rebs: Lual-Acuil 8 Asts: Ili 7	Attendance: 4,819

22 January 2022	Illawarra Hawks	78–94	Perth Wildcats	WIN Entertainment Centre, Wollongong
20:00	Scoring by quarter: 23–13, 18–23, 16–30, 21–28
ESPN	Pts: Jessup, Rathan-Mayes 17; Rebs: Cleveland, Rathan-Mayes, S.Froling 8 Asts: Harvey, Rathan-Mayes 4	boxscore report	Pts: Cotton 24; Rebs: Frazier II 10; Asts: Norton 6	Attendance: 2,278

23 January 2022	Sydney Kings	97–73	Brisbane Bullets	Qudos Bank Arena, Sydney
13:00	Scoring by quarter: 28–18, 25–14, 25–18, 19–23
10 Peach	Pts: Vasiljevic 23; Rebs: Martin 12; Asts: Adams 6	boxscore report	Pts: Patterson 16; Rebs: Patterson, Franks 8 Asts: Krebs, Sobey 3	Attendance: 4,237

23 January 2022	Tasmania JackJumpers	63–76	South East Melbourne Phoenix	MyState Bank Arena, Hobart
15:00	Scoring by quarter: 24–23, 14–12, 15–32, 10–9
10 Peach	Pts: Steindl 16; Rebs: Magnay 8 Asts: Magette 9	boxscore report	Pts: Creek 21; Rebs: Ashley, Broekhoff 11; Asts: Adnam 5	Attendance: 4,235

24 January 2022	Illawarra Hawks	100–89	Adelaide 36ers	WIN Entertainment Centre, Wollongong
19:30	Scoring by quarter: 23–19, 27–26, 31–14, 19–30
ESPN	Pts: H.Froling 27; Rebs: H.Froling 9 Asts: Rathan-Mayes 7	boxscore report	Pts: Dech 20; Rebs: Bairstow 10; Asts: McCarron 5	Attendance: 2,141

25 January 2022	South East Melbourne Phoenix	87–77	Cairns Taipans	Gippsland Regional Indoor Sports Stadium, Traralgon
19:30	Scoring by quarter: 19–19, 30–18, 15–19, 23–21
ESPN	Pts: Creek 26; Rebs: Broekhoff, Creek 8 Asts: Munford 4	boxscore report	Pts: McCall 16; Rebs: Zimmerman 8 Asts: McCall 9	Attendance: 2,634

26 January 2022	Brisbane Bullets	82–84	Melbourne United	Nissan Arena, Brisbane
14:00	Scoring by quarter: 28–17, 12–24, 24–18, 18–25
ESPN	Pts: Patterson 21; Rebs: Franks 8 Asts: Cadee 4	boxscore report	Pts: Dellavedova 16; Rebs: Lual-Acuil 10; Asts: Agada, Ili 4	Attendance: 2,479

=== Round 9 ===
27 January 2022	Illawarra Hawks	80–94	Perth Wildcats	WIN Entertainment Centre, Wollongong
19:30	Scoring by quarter: 22–21, 22–25, 21–29, 15–19
ESPN	Pts: Cleveland 22; Rebs: Cleveland, Reath 7 Asts: S.Froling, Harvey, Rathan-Mayes 3	boxscore report	Pts: Cotton 28; Rebs: Frazier II, Law 8 Asts: Norton 6	Attendance: 2,240

28 January 2022	Tasmania JackJumpers	76–71	Adelaide 36ers	MyState Bank Arena, Hobart
19:30	Scoring by quarter: 15–24, 26–23, 11–12, 24–12
ESPN	Pts: Adams 24; Rebs: Magnay 9 Asts: Magette 7	boxscore report	Pts: Hannahs 22; Rebs: Bairstow 18; Asts: Johnson 5	Attendance: 4,632

29 January 2022	Cairns Taipans	75–94	Illawarra Hawks	Cairns Convention Centre, Cairns
16:30	Scoring by quarter: 20–23, 20–20, 19–25, 16–26
ESPN	Pts: McCall 19; Rebs: Pinder 12; Asts: McCall 6	boxscore report	Pts: Harvey 24; Rebs: S.Froling 13; Asts: Harvey, Jessup 3	Attendance: 3,095

29 January 2022	Brisbane Bullets	73–88	South East Melbourne Phoenix	Nissan Arena, Brisbane
19:00	Scoring by quarter: 26–29, 13–21, 28–21, 6–17
ESPN	Pts: Patterson 26; Rebs: Deng 11; Asts: Patterson 5	boxscore report	Pts: Creek 22; Rebs: Ashley, Broekhoff 7 Asts: Munford 5	Attendance: 2,552

30 January 2022	Adelaide 36ers	88–83(OT)	Melbourne United	Adelaide Entertainment Centre, Adelaide
12:30	Scoring by quarter: 17–19, 21–11, 21–21, 15–23, Overtime: 14–9
10 Peach	Pts: Hannahs 19; Rebs: Bairstow 13; Asts: Bairstow, McCarron 5	boxscore report	Pts: Lual-Acuil 23; Rebs: Lual-Acuil 12; Asts: Dellavedova 9	Attendance: 4,906

30 January 2022	Sydney Kings	96–81	Perth Wildcats	Qudos Bank Arena, Sydney
15:00	Scoring by quarter: 30–21, 25–17, 17–21, 24–22
10 Peach	Pts: Adams 30; Rebs: Cooks 9 Asts: Adams 9	boxscore report	Pts: Cotton, Law 20; Rebs: Law 9 Asts: Cotton 4	Attendance: 5,864

30 January 2022	New Zealand Breakers	59–83	Tasmania JackJumpers	MyState Bank Arena, Hobart
17:30	Scoring by quarter: 13–23, 14–30, 20–14, 12–16
ESPN	Pts: Besson 19; Rebs: Besson 8 Asts: McDowell-White 7	boxscore report	Pts: Magette 22; Rebs: Kenyon 8 Asts: Magette 8	Attendance: 1,477

=== Round 10 ===
2 February 2022	New Zealand Breakers	90–67	Illawarra Hawks	MyState Bank Arena, Hobart
19:30	Scoring by quarter: 26–20, 26–13, 18–24, 20–10
ESPN	Pts: Wetzell 22; Rebs: Delany 13; Asts: McDowell-White 6	boxscore report	Pts: Harvey 17; Rebs: Cleveland, S.Froling 7 Asts: Harvey 3	Attendance: closed event

4 February 2022	Tasmania JackJumpers	77–70	Sydney Kings	MyState Bank Arena, Hobart
19:30	Scoring by quarter: 15–24, 29–14, 14–16, 19–16
ESPN	Pts: Magette 18; Rebs: Magnay, McVeigh 7 Asts: Adams 4	boxscore report	Pts: Adams 24; Rebs: Cooks 15; Asts: Adams 3	Attendance: 4,643
Note: Original date - 8 January 2022

5 February 2022	Brisbane Bullets	94–102	Cairns Taipans	Nissan Arena, Brisbane
16:30	Scoring by quarter: 25–30, 28–23, 18–20, 23–29
ESPN	Pts: Franks 22; Rebs: Harrison 8 Asts: Cadee 5	boxscore report	Pts: Deng, Kuol 26; Rebs: Zimmerman 14; Asts: McCall 6	Attendance: 2,695
Note: Original date - 26 December 2021

5 February 2022	South East Melbourne Phoenix	79–101	Perth Wildcats	John Cain Arena, Melbourne
20:00	Scoring by quarter: 27–15, 11–33, 18–23, 23–30
ESPN	Pts: Munford 18; Rebs: Ashley, Creek 9 Asts: Ashley, Creek, Munford 3	boxscore report	Pts: Travers 24; Rebs: Frazier II 9 Asts: Cotton 6	Attendance: 3,727

6 February 2022	Sydney Kings	84–65	New Zealand Breakers	Qudos Bank Arena, Sydney
13:00	Scoring by quarter: 25–16, 26–19, 9–16, 24–14
10 Peach	Pts: Vasiljevic 23; Rebs: Martin 12; Asts: Adams 7	boxscore report	Pts: Wetzell 16; Rebs: Delany, Dieng, Wetzell 5 Asts: McDowell-White, Wetzell 3	Attendance: 5,011
Note: Original date - 13 February 2022

6 February 2022	Melbourne United	85–94	Tasmania JackJumpers	John Cain Arena, Melbourne
15:00	Scoring by quarter: 23–36, 22–21, 21–16, 19–21
10 Peach	Pts: Goulding 29; Rebs: Lual-Acuil 21; Asts: Ili 5	boxscore report	Pts: McVeigh 17; Rebs: McDaniel 6 Asts: Magette 6	Attendance: 8,499

7 February 2022	Illawarra Hawks	87–88	South East Melbourne Phoenix	WIN Entertainment Centre, Wollongong
19:30	Scoring by quarter: 18–28, 20–19, 25–19, 24–22
ESPN	Pts: Harvey 20; Rebs: Rathan-Mayes, Reath 8 Asts: Rathan-Mayes 5	boxscore report	Pts: Munford 24; Rebs: Broekhoff 16; Asts: Munford 5	Attendance: 2,040
Note: Original date - 23 December 2021

=== Round 11 ===
10 February 2022	South East Melbourne Phoenix	87–92	Sydney Kings	John Cain Arena, Melbourne
19:30	Scoring by quarter: 22–29, 17–14, 23–21, 25–28
ESPN	Pts: Broekhoff 25; Rebs: Zhou Qi 10; Asts: Le'afa 6	boxscore report	Pts: Cooks 23; Rebs: Adams, Martin 8 Asts: Adams 6	Attendance: 2,133
Note: Original date - 10 February 2022

11 February 2022	Brisbane Bullets	77–73	Adelaide 36ers	Nissan Arena, Brisbane
18:30	Scoring by quarter: 21–25, 15–13, 21–23, 20–12
ESPN	Pts: Patterson 32; Rebs: Drmic, Franks 5 Asts: Cadee 9	boxscore report	Pts: Johnson 15; Rebs: Johnson 14; Asts: Johnson, McCarron 4	Attendance: 2,358

12 February 2022	Illawarra Hawks	87–81	Cairns Taipans	WIN Entertainment Centre, Wollongong
17:30	Scoring by quarter: 29–28, 23–21, 17–14, 18–18
ESPN	Pts: Jessup, Reath 18; Rebs: Reath 10; Asts: Rathan-Mayes 5	boxscore report	Pts: McCall 17; Rebs: Pinder 9 Asts: McCall 4	Attendance: 2,652
Note: Original date - 2 January 2022

12 February 2022	Melbourne United	93–87	Perth Wildcats	John Cain Arena, Melbourne
20:00	Scoring by quarter: 16–29, 37–19, 26–13, 14–26
ESPN	Pts: Lual-Acuil 22; Rebs: Agada, Lual-Acuil 13; Asts: Dellavedova 5	boxscore report	Pts: Cotton 31; Rebs: Law 10; Asts: Cotton, Norton 4	Attendance: 6,401

13 February 2022	South East Melbourne Phoenix	83–71	Tasmania JackJumpers	John Cain Arena, Melbourne
13:00	Scoring by quarter: 16–14, 22–26, 21–12, 24–19
10 Peach	Pts: Broekhoff 18; Rebs: Broekhoff 8 Asts: Adnam 5	boxscore report	Pts: Adams 23; Rebs: McVeigh 6 Asts: Magette 5	Attendance: 3,875

13 February 2022	Sydney Kings	71–69	Brisbane Bullets	Qudos Bank Arena, Sydney
15:00	Scoring by quarter: 17–20, 22–15, 15–22, 17–12
10 Peach	Pts: Martin 17; Rebs: Cooks 12; Asts: Adams, Bruce, Glover 4	boxscore report	Pts: Franks 18; Rebs: Franks 9 Asts: Cadee 6	Attendance: 5,543

14 February 2022	Cairns Taipans	83–84	New Zealand Breakers	Cairns Convention Centre, Cairns
18:30	Scoring by quarter: 12–30, 23–25, 32–14, 16–15
ESPN	Pts: Deng 21; Rebs: Zimmerman 11; Asts: McCall 6	boxscore report	Pts: Wetzell 23; Rebs: Wetzell 12; Asts: Besson 5	Attendance: 2,795
Note: Original date - 23 January 2022

=== Round 12 ===
17 February 2022	Melbourne United	94–87	South East Melbourne Phoenix	John Cain Arena, Melbourne
19:30	Scoring by quarter: 30–17, 11–25, 23–26, 30–19
ESPN	Pts: Lual-Acuil 30; Rebs: White 14; Asts: Ili 8	boxscore report	Pts: Creek 23; Rebs: Zhou Qi 9 Asts: Munford 5	Attendance: 5,012

18 February 2022	Illawarra Hawks	79–54	Cairns Taipans	WIN Entertainment Centre, Wollongong
19:30	Scoring by quarter: 17–21, 24–16, 16–9, 22–8
ESPN	Pts: Reath 16; Rebs: S.Froling 10; Asts: Rathan-Mayes 4	boxscore report	Pts: Deng 11; Rebs: Zimmerman 8 Asts: McCall 3	Attendance: 2,275

19 February 2022	South East Melbourne Phoenix	98–94	Brisbane Bullets	John Cain Arena, Melbourne
17:30	Scoring by quarter: 30–23, 20–24, 27–24, 21–23
ESPN	Pts: Gliddon 20; Rebs: Broekhoff 8 Asts: Adnam 5	boxscore report	Pts: Patterson 27; Rebs: Franks 8 Asts: Cadee 8	Attendance: 3,252
Note: Original date - 13 February 2022

19 February 2022	Sydney Kings	98–95	Perth Wildcats	Qudos Bank Arena, Sydney
20:00	Scoring by quarter: 31–24, 14–27, 29–16, 24–28
ESPN	Pts: Adams 31; Rebs: Cooks 9 Asts: Adams 10	boxscore report	Pts: Cotton 33; Rebs: Hodgson, Majok, Norton, Travers 5 Asts: Cotton, Norton 4	Attendance: 7,143

20 February 2022	Adelaide 36ers	82–71	Cairns Taipans	Adelaide Entertainment Centre, Adelaide
12:30	Scoring by quarter: 9–23, 25–11, 20–13, 28–24
10 Peach	Pts: Johnson 18; Rebs: Johnson 9 Asts: Dech, McCarron 5	boxscore report	Pts: Zimmerman 21; Rebs: Zimmerman 13; Asts: McCall 5	Attendance: 5,068
Note: Original date - 3 February 2022

20 February 2022	Melbourne United	108–73	New Zealand Breakers	John Cain Arena, Melbourne
15:00	Scoring by quarter: 30–20, 30–13, 24–11, 24–29
10 Peach	Pts: Agada 17; Rebs: Agada 9 Asts: Dellavedova 9	boxscore report	Pts: Besson, Siva 17; Rebs: Besson, Delany 5 Asts: Siva 5	Attendance: 6,033
Note: Original date - 12 February 2022

20 February 2022	Illawarra Hawks	86–96	Tasmania JackJumpers	WIN Entertainment Centre, Wollongong
17:30	Scoring by quarter: 22–20, 21–26, 20–27, 23–23
ESPN	Pts: Reath 25; Rebs: Rathan-Mayes 10; Asts: Rathan-Mayes 9	boxscore report	Pts: Adams 28; Rebs: McVeigh 7 Asts: Magette 5	Attendance: 2,325
Note: Original date - 12 February 2022

=== Round 13 ===
24 February 2022	Cairns Taipans	73–69	Brisbane Bullets	Cairns Convention Centre, Cairns
18:30	Scoring by quarter: 32–19, 19–22, 9–12, 13–16
ESPN	Pts: Machado 17; Rebs: Zimmerman 12; Asts: Machado 7	boxscore report	Pts: Cadee 15; Rebs: Harrison 7 Asts: Cadee 8	Attendance: 2,853

25 February 2022	Illawarra Hawks	87–71	Adelaide 36ers	WIN Entertainment Centre, Wollongong
19:30	Scoring by quarter: 26–20, 24–17, 12–20, 25–14
ESPN	Pts: Reath 18; Rebs: S.Froling 9 Asts: Cleveland 6	boxscore report	Pts: Dech 18; Rebs: Bairstow 12; Asts: McCarron 4	Attendance: 3,002

26 February 2022	Brisbane Bullets	94–86	Tasmania JackJumpers	Nissan Arena, Brisbane
16:30	Scoring by quarter: 24–22, 29–22, 16–17, 25–25
ESPN	Pts: Franks 23; Rebs: Franks 11; Asts: Patterson 10	boxscore report	Pts: McIntosh, McVeigh 21; Rebs: Steindl 7 Asts: Magette 8	Attendance: 2,683
Note: Original date - 10 February 2022

26 February 2022	South East Melbourne Phoenix	86–80	Perth Wildcats	John Cain Arena, Melbourne
20:00	Scoring by quarter: 21–15, 24–16, 18–26, 23–23
ESPN	Pts: Adnam 24; Rebs: Broekhoff 11; Asts: Adnam 6	boxscore report	Pts: Law 22; Rebs: Law 9 Asts: Norton 7	Attendance: 3,606
Note: Original date - 13 February 2022

27 February 2022	Adelaide 36ers	90–93	Sydney Kings	Adelaide Entertainment Centre, Adelaide
12:30	Scoring by quarter: 25–23, 22–22, 24–24, 19–24
10 Peach	Pts: Hannahs 24; Rebs: Bairstow, Johnson 8 Asts: McCarron 7	boxscore report	Pts: Adams 26; Rebs: Cooks 10; Asts: Adams 8	Attendance: 4,813

27 February 2022	Cairns Taipans	73–89	Melbourne United	Cairns Convention Centre, Cairns
14:00	Scoring by quarter: 13–23, 22–25, 22–13, 16–28
10 Peach	Pts: McCall 16; Rebs: Pinder 9 Asts: McCall 7	boxscore report	Pts: Goulding 21; Rebs: Hukporti, Peatling, White 8 Asts: Dellavedova 5	Attendance: 3,272
Note: Original date - 15 January 2022

28 February 2022	Tasmania JackJumpers	78–89	Perth Wildcats	MyState Bank Arena, Hobart
19:30	Scoring by quarter: 22–16, 17–28, 12–20, 27–25
ESPN	Pts: McVeigh 16; Rebs: Krslovic, Magette, McVeigh 5 Asts: Magette 6	boxscore report	Pts: Cotton 20; Rebs: Law 13; Asts: Cotton 5	Attendance: 4,738

1 March 2022	New Zealand Breakers	87–102	Illawarra Hawks	MyState Bank Arena, Hobart
20:00	Scoring by quarter: 22–20, 25–29, 20–30, 20–23
ESPN	Pts: Besson 20; Rebs: Besson 7 Asts: Siva 8	boxscore report	Pts: Jessup 23; Rebs: Coenraad, S.Froling 8 Asts: Rathan-Mayes 7	Attendance: closed event

=== Round 14 ===
4 March 2022	Adelaide 36ers	76–83	South East Melbourne Phoenix	Adelaide Entertainment Centre, Adelaide
19:00	Scoring by quarter: 25–26, 17–24, 12–15, 22–18
ESPN	Pts: Johnson 31; Rebs: Johnson, Sotto 8 Asts: McCarron 9	boxscore report	Pts: Creek 29; Rebs: Creek, Zhou Qi 7 Asts: Creek 5	Attendance: 4,775
Note: Original date - 2 January 2022

5 March 2022	Tasmania JackJumpers	66–62	New Zealand Breakers	Silverdome, Launceston
17:30	Scoring by quarter: 23–19, 15–20, 12–14, 16–9
ESPN	Pts: McIntosh 21; Rebs: Kenyon, McDaniel 7 Asts: Magette 7	boxscore report	Pts: Randle 18; Rebs: Dieng 9 Asts: Siva 9	Attendance: 3,532

5 March 2022	Melbourne United	95–83	Brisbane Bullets	John Cain Arena, Melbourne
20:00	Scoring by quarter: 20–20, 16–17, 26–18, 33–28
ESPN	Pts: Lual-Acuil 20; Rebs: Lual-Acuil, White 8 Asts: Ili 6	boxscore report	Pts: Franks 20; Rebs: Cadee, Salt 5 Asts: Cadee, Patterson 5	Attendance: 6,086

6 March 2022	Adelaide 36ers	73–92	Perth Wildcats	Adelaide Entertainment Centre, Adelaide
12:30	Scoring by quarter: 20–27, 14–23, 26–26, 13–16
10 Peach	Pts: Johnson 19; Rebs: Johnson 12; Asts: McCarron 6	boxscore report	Pts: Cotton 27; Rebs: Law 10; Asts: Cotton 7	Attendance: 4,157

6 March 2022	Sydney Kings	98–88	Cairns Taipans	Qudos Bank Arena, Sydney
15:00	Scoring by quarter: 25–25, 22–19, 26–17, 25–27
10 Peach	Pts: Cooks 23; Rebs: Cooks 13; Asts: Cooks 5	boxscore report	Pts: Machado 26; Rebs: Zimmerman 14; Asts: Machado 8	Attendance: 9,112
Note: Original date - 6 February 2022

6 March 2022	South East Melbourne Phoenix	77–83	Illawarra Hawks	John Cain Arena, Melbourne
17:30	Scoring by quarter: 18–18, 15–15, 22–24, 22–26
ESPN	Pts: Creek 18; Rebs: Broekhoff, Munford, Zhou Qi 7 Asts: Munford 6	boxscore report	Pts: Rathan-Mayes 19; Rebs: Cleveland, Jessup 7 Asts: Cleveland, H.Froling, Harvey, Rathan-Mayes 3	Attendance: 2,989
Note: Original date - 10 February 2022

7 March 2022	New Zealand Breakers	74–92	Brisbane Bullets	MyState Bank Arena, Hobart
19:30	Scoring by quarter: 18–19, 13–20, 12–27, 31–26
ESPN	Pts: Randle 20; Rebs: Delany 6 Asts: Siva 6	boxscore report	Pts: Franks 23; Rebs: Franks 10; Asts: Cadee 9	Attendance: closed event

=== Round 15 ===
10 March 2022	Melbourne United	87–97	Perth Wildcats	John Cain Arena, Melbourne
19:30	Scoring by quarter: 25–26, 23–20, 16–23, 23–28
ESPN	Pts: Lual-Acuil 16; Rebs: White 9 Asts: Dellavedova 5	boxscore report	Pts: Norton 26; Rebs: Law 18; Asts: Cotton 5	Attendance: 4,169

11 March 2022	Cairns Taipans	69–85	Tasmania JackJumpers	Cairns Convention Centre, Cairns
18:30	Scoring by quarter: 19–15, 9–24, 15–18, 26–28
ESPN	Pts: Zimmerman 19; Rebs: Zimmerman 8 Asts: Kenny, Machado 5	boxscore report	Pts: Adams 20; Rebs: Adams, Bairstow, Kenyon, Magette 5 Asts: Magette, Weeks 3	Attendance: 3,300

12 March 2022	Brisbane Bullets	83–95	Perth Wildcats	Nissan Arena, Brisbane
16:30	Scoring by quarter: 17–15, 30–27, 8–26, 28–27
ESPN	Pts: Franks 21; Rebs: Franks 8 Asts: Patterson 8	boxscore report	Pts: Law 24; Rebs: Law 8 Asts: Law 4	Attendance: 3,202
Note: Original date - 1 January 2022

12 March 2022	New Zealand Breakers	84–75	Adelaide 36ers	Adelaide Arena, Adelaide
19:30	Scoring by quarter: 30–16, 16–24, 22–17, 16–18
ESPN	Pts: Besson 17; Rebs: Wetzell 9 Asts: Siva 6	boxscore report	Pts: Sotto 14; Rebs: Dech 8 Asts: Dech 7	Attendance: 3,044

13 March 2022	Tasmania JackJumpers	81–77	Illawarra Hawks	MyState Bank Arena, Hobart
13:00	Scoring by quarter: 16–15, 31–17, 15–20, 19–25
10 Peach	Pts: Steindl 20; Rebs: Kenyon 10; Asts: Magette 7	boxscore report	Pts: Harvey 16; Rebs: Reath 7 Asts: S.Froling 4	Attendance: 4,738

13 March 2022	South East Melbourne Phoenix	90–98	Melbourne United	John Cain Arena, Melbourne
15:00	Scoring by quarter: 30–29, 19–25, 24–12, 17–32
10 Peach	Pts: Creek 27; Rebs: Zhou Qi 12; Asts: Creek 5	boxscore report	Pts: Dellavedova 22; Rebs: Lual-Acuil 15; Asts: Ili 5	Attendance: 8,319

13 March 2022	Cairns Taipans	77–86	Sydney Kings	Cairns Convention Centre, Cairns
16:30	Scoring by quarter: 15–27, 16–17, 20–21, 26–21
ESPN	Pts: McCall 21; Rebs: Deng 8 Asts: McCall 7	boxscore report	Pts: Adams 24; Rebs: Maker 10; Asts: Adams 7	Attendance: 3,629

14 March 2022	New Zealand Breakers	102–104(OT)	Perth Wildcats	MyState Bank Arena, Hobart
19:30	Scoring by quarter: 17–24, 23–23, 28–20, 20–21, Overtime: 14–16
ESPN	Pts: Besson 23; Rebs: Wetzell 18; Asts: Siva 7	boxscore report	Pts: Law 39; Rebs: Cotton, Law 8 Asts: Cotton 8	Attendance: closed event

=== Round 16 ===
17 March 2022	Illawarra Hawks	103–97	South East Melbourne Phoenix	WIN Entertainment Centre, Wollongong
19:30	Scoring by quarter: 30–20, 23–28, 31–18, 19–31
ESPN	Pts: Harvey, Reath 22; Rebs: Reath 12; Asts: Cleveland 4	boxscore report	Pts: Zhou Qi 25; Rebs: Zhou Qi 8 Asts: Adnam 6	Attendance: 2,324

18 March 2022	Adelaide 36ers	83–57	Cairns Taipans	Adelaide Entertainment Centre, Adelaide
19:00	Scoring by quarter: 20–16, 24–23, 17–12, 22–6
ESPN	Pts: McCarron 21; Rebs: McCarron 10; Asts: Dech, McCarron 3	boxscore report	Pts: Pinder 15; Rebs: Pinder 14; Asts: Machado 6	Attendance: 3,596

19 March 2022	Tasmania JackJumpers	65–91	Illawarra Hawks	Silverdome, Launceston
17:30	Scoring by quarter: 26–17, 15–32, 12–22, 12–20
ESPN	Pts: Adams 21; Rebs: McVeigh 7 Asts: Magette 6	boxscore report	Pts: Cleveland 22; Rebs: Reath 11; Asts: Rathan-Mayes 5	Attendance: 3,532

19 March 2022	South East Melbourne Phoenix	89–91	Sydney Kings	John Cain Arena, Melbourne
20:00	Scoring by quarter: 22–23, 28–25, 17–22, 22–21
ESPN	Pts: Munford 26; Rebs: Zhou Qi 8 Asts: Adnam, Munford 5	boxscore report	Pts: Martin 24; Rebs: Martin 8 Asts: Adams 8	Attendance: 2,717

20 March 2022	Melbourne United	101–74	Adelaide 36ers	John Cain Arena, Melbourne
13:00	Scoring by quarter: 18–20, 28–21, 23–15, 32–18
10 Peach	Pts: Lual-Acuil, Newley 15; Rebs: Lual-Acuil 9 Asts: Goulding 6	boxscore report	Pts: Johnson 18; Rebs: Sunday 6 Asts: Dufelmeier, McCarron 3	Attendance: 5,814

20 March 2022	Brisbane Bullets	88–98	Cairns Taipans	Nissan Arena, Brisbane
14:00	Scoring by quarter: 12–32, 33–22, 21–25, 22–19
10 Peach	Pts: Franks 22; Rebs: Franks 10; Asts: Drmic, Patterson 4	boxscore report	Pts: McCall 21; Rebs: Pinder 9 Asts: Machado 11	Attendance: 2,409

20 March 2022	Perth Wildcats	95–85	New Zealand Breakers	RAC Arena, Perth
14:30	Scoring by quarter: 28–34, 15–15, 26–15, 26–21
ESPN	Pts: Law 26; Rebs: Law, Majok 12; Asts: Cotton 6	boxscore report	Pts: Wetzell 15; Rebs: Wetzell 6 Asts: Siva 9	Attendance: 6,927
Note: Original date - 6 February 2022

=== Round 17 ===
24 March 2022	New Zealand Breakers	100–101(OT)	Brisbane Bullets	Cairns Convention Centre, Cairns
18:30	Scoring by quarter: 29–22, 28–24, 18–22, 13–20, Overtime: 12–13
ESPN	Pts: Wetzell 23; Rebs: Wetzell 10; Asts: Siva 8	boxscore report	Pts: Franks 31; Rebs: Franks 12; Asts: Cadee 11	Attendance: closed event

24 March 2022	Perth Wildcats	83–85	Tasmania JackJumpers	RAC Arena, Perth
18:30	Scoring by quarter: 20–27, 28–19, 19–23, 16–16
ESPN	Pts: Cotton 23; Rebs: Law 10; Asts: Cotton, Travers 5	boxscore report	Pts: McVeigh 19; Rebs: McVeigh 7 Asts: Adams, Magette 5	Attendance: 6,678

25 March 2022	Cairns Taipans	74–86	South East Melbourne Phoenix	Cairns Convention Centre, Cairns
18:30	Scoring by quarter: 22–24, 16–19, 21–26, 15–17
ESPN	Pts: McCall 14; Rebs: McCall, Pinder 9 Asts: McCall, Machado 5	boxscore report	Pts: Ashley 25; Rebs: Creek 8 Asts: Munford 4	Attendance: 3,044

26 March 2022	Brisbane Bullets	82–84	Tasmania JackJumpers	Nissan Arena, Brisbane
16:30	Scoring by quarter: 16–24, 27–22, 15–17, 24–21
ESPN	Pts: Franks 21; Rebs: Franks 12; Asts: Patterson 6	boxscore report	Pts: Magette, McVeigh 15; Rebs: McDaniel 7 Asts: Magette 8	Attendance: 2,489

26 March 2022	Perth Wildcats	80–102	Sydney Kings	RAC Arena, Perth
17:00	Scoring by quarter: 14–35, 25–29, 26–20, 15–18
ESPN	Pts: Cotton, Travers 20; Rebs: Law 10; Asts: Zunic 3	boxscore report	Pts: Adams 20; Rebs: Maker 9 Asts: Adams 8	Attendance: 6,906

27 March 2022	Adelaide 36ers	100–92	South East Melbourne Phoenix	Adelaide Entertainment Centre, Adelaide
12:30	Scoring by quarter: 25–18, 19–27, 25–18, 31–29
10 Peach	Pts: Johnson 22; Rebs: Johnson 10; Asts: Dufelmeier 4	boxscore report	Pts: Creek 27; Rebs: Creek 12; Asts: Munford 3	Attendance: 3,765

27 March 2022	Melbourne United	77–92	Illawarra Hawks	John Cain Arena, Melbourne
15:00	Scoring by quarter: 19–25, 16–21, 23–24, 19–22
10 Peach	Pts: Lual-Acuil 18; Rebs: Agada 13; Asts: Agada 5	boxscore report	Pts: Cleveland 20; Rebs: Cleveland 8 Asts: Rathan-Mayes 7	Attendance: 5,017

27 March 2022	New Zealand Breakers	90–93	Cairns Taipans	Cairns Convention Centre, Cairns
16:30	Scoring by quarter: 17–24, 28–19, 23–28, 22–22
ESPN	Pts: Wetzell 21; Rebs: Wetzell 8 Asts: Besson 6	boxscore report	Pts: Noi 19; Rebs: Deng, Noi 6 Asts: Machado 6	Attendance: closed event

=== Round 18 ===
31 March 2022	Illawarra Hawks	87–70	Brisbane Bullets	WIN Entertainment Centre, Wollongong
19:30	Scoring by quarter: 29–15, 24–24, 15–17, 19–14
ESPN	Pts: Jessup 29; Rebs: Cleveland 9 Asts: Cleveland 6	boxscore report	Pts: Digbeu, Franks 13; Rebs: Franks 13; Asts: Franks, Patterson 5	Attendance: 2,262

1 April 2022	Adelaide 36ers	72–80	Tasmania JackJumpers	Adelaide Entertainment Centre, Adelaide
19:00	Scoring by quarter: 15–24, 28–17, 19–17, 10–22
ESPN	Pts: Johnson 16; Rebs: McCarron 6 Asts: McCarron 8	boxscore report	Pts: Adams 31; Rebs: Krslovic 8 Asts: Magette 7	Attendance: 3,407

2 April 2022	Melbourne United	90–96	Illawarra Hawks	John Cain Arena, Melbourne
17:30	Scoring by quarter: 30–32, 20–15, 25–24, 15–25
ESPN	Pts: White 17; Rebs: Hukporti, Lual-Acuil, Newley 5 Asts: Ili 5	boxscore report	Pts: Rathan-Mayes 25; Rebs: Jessup, Reath 9 Asts: Rathan-Mayes 8	Attendance: 4,517

2 April 2022	Cairns Taipans	90–85	South East Melbourne Phoenix	Cairns Convention Centre, Cairns
19:00	Scoring by quarter: 29–26, 27–22, 13–17, 21–20
ESPN	Pts: Pinder 21; Rebs: Pinder 13; Asts: Machado 11	boxscore report	Pts: Creek 21; Rebs: Munford 7 Asts: Creek 4	Attendance: 3,206

3 April 2022	Tasmania JackJumpers	83–103	Sydney Kings	MyState Bank Arena, Hobart
13:00	Scoring by quarter: 14–30, 15–27, 27–21, 27–25
10 Peach	Pts: Adams 18; Rebs: McDaniel 7 Asts: Macdonald 4	boxscore report	Pts: Adams 20; Rebs: Cooks 9 Asts: Cooks 9	Attendance: 4,738

3 April 2022	Brisbane Bullets	92–91	Adelaide 36ers	Nissan Arena, Brisbane
15:00	Scoring by quarter: 30–26, 21–24, 14–20, 27–21
10 Peach	Pts: Cadee 26; Rebs: Franks 12; Asts: Cadee 5	boxscore report	Pts: Johnson 28; Rebs: McCarron 10; Asts: McCarron 7	Attendance: 3,280

4 April 2022	New Zealand Breakers	77–87	Cairns Taipans	MyState Bank Arena, Hobart
19:30	Scoring by quarter: 18–23, 22–24, 14–12, 23–28
ESPN	Pts: Wetzell 24; Rebs: Wetzell 9 Asts: McDowell-White 4	boxscore report	Pts: Pinder 21; Rebs: Noi 14; Asts: Machado 6	Attendance: closed event

4 April 2022	Perth Wildcats	75–84	Melbourne United	RAC Arena, Perth
19:30	Scoring by quarter: 23–25, 21–15, 18–22, 13–22
ESPN	Pts: Cotton 18; Rebs: Hodgson 11; Asts: Cotton, Travers 4	boxscore report	Pts: Goulding 18; Rebs: White 10; Asts: Dellavedova 6	Attendance: 10,192

=== Round 19 ===
7 April 2022	South East Melbourne Phoenix	88–90	Melbourne United	John Cain Arena, Melbourne
19:30	Scoring by quarter: 24–29, 22–16, 23–17, 19–28
ESPN	Pts: Creek 20; Rebs: Zhou Qi 7 Asts: Le'afa 6	boxscore report	Pts: Goulding 20; Rebs: Lual-Acuil 11; Asts: Dellavedova, Ili, Lual-Acuil 4	Attendance: 4,167

7 April 2022	Perth Wildcats	89–80	New Zealand Breakers	RAC Arena, Perth
19:30	Scoring by quarter: 19–16, 25–20, 21–19, 24–25
ESPN	Pts: Law 18; Rebs: Travers 9 Asts: Cotton 5	boxscore report	Pts: Wetzell 22; Rebs: Wetzell 10; Asts: Siva 6	Attendance: 10,270

8 April 2022	Tasmania JackJumpers	87–80	Cairns Taipans	MyState Bank Arena, Hobart
19:30	Scoring by quarter: 19–22, 21–27, 26–10, 21–21
ESPN	Pts: McVeigh 16; Rebs: McVeigh 7 Asts: Magette 7	boxscore report	Pts: Jawai 17; Rebs: Pinder 9 Asts: Machado 6	Attendance: 4,738

9 April 2022	Brisbane Bullets	77–108	Illawarra Hawks	Nissan Arena, Brisbane
17:30	Scoring by quarter: 15–32, 24–22, 20–29, 18–25
ESPN	Pts: Franks 19; Rebs: Patterson 6 Asts: Cadee, Digbeu 5	boxscore report	Pts: Reath 28; Rebs: Reath 11; Asts: Cleveland, Harvey 6	Attendance: 3,652
Note: Original date - 5 February 2022

9 April 2022	Adelaide 36ers	77–84	Sydney Kings	Adelaide Entertainment Centre, Adelaide
19:30	Scoring by quarter: 18–19, 21–26, 12–19, 26–20
ESPN	Pts: Johnson 20; Rebs: Johnson, McCarron 7 Asts: Johnson, McCarron 4	boxscore report	Pts: Cooks 22; Rebs: Cooks 9 Asts: Adams 5	Attendance: 4,748

10 April 2022	New Zealand Breakers	89–99	South East Melbourne Phoenix	Bendigo Stadium, Bendigo
13:00	Scoring by quarter: 25–23, 19–29, 10–25, 35–22
10 Peach	Pts: Dieng 22; Rebs: Dieng, Wetzell 6 Asts: Delany 7	boxscore report	Pts: Munford 25; Rebs: Creek 8 Asts: Munford 8	Attendance: not available

10 April 2022	Cairns Taipans	63–92	Melbourne United	Cairns Convention Centre, Cairns
15:00	Scoring by quarter: 20–28, 18–15, 10–28, 15–21
10 Peach	Pts: Pinder 15; Rebs: Pinder 12; Asts: Ayre 5	boxscore report	Pts: Lual-Acuil 23; Rebs: Lual-Acuil 11; Asts: Dellavedova 7	Attendance: 3,418

11 April 2022	Adelaide 36ers	85–93	Brisbane Bullets	Adelaide Entertainment Centre, Adelaide
19:00	Scoring by quarter: 24–23, 17–18, 15–25, 29–27
ESPN	Pts: Sotto 21; Rebs: Johnson 10; Asts: Johnson, McCarron 6	boxscore report	Pts: Cadee, Digbeu, Patterson 15; Rebs: Deng 8 Asts: Drmic 4	Attendance: 3,829
Note: Original date - 3 February 2022

12 April 2022	New Zealand Breakers	70–76	Sydney Kings	Bendigo Stadium, Bendigo
19:30	Scoring by quarter: 20–17, 10–24, 23–17, 17–18
ESPN	Pts: Wetzell 22; Rebs: Wetzell 14; Asts: McDowell-White, Siva 6	boxscore report	Pts: Adams 19; Rebs: Cooks 7 Asts: Adams 5	Attendance: 1,543

=== Round 20 ===
14 April 2022	Illawarra Hawks	102–107(OT)	Sydney Kings	WIN Entertainment Centre, Wollongong
19:30	Scoring by quarter: 23–24, 30–29, 22–25, 17–14, Overtime: 10–15
ESPN	Pts: Harvey 35; Rebs: S.Froling 13; Asts: Harvey 5	boxscore report	Pts: Vasiljevic 33; Rebs: Cooks 13; Asts: Adams, Cooks 7	Attendance: 4,872

14 April 2022	Perth Wildcats	70–82	Adelaide 36ers	RAC Arena, Perth
19:30	Scoring by quarter: 15–30, 23–19, 13–21, 19–12
ESPN	Pts: Law 20; Rebs: Hodgson 6 Asts: Cotton 5	boxscore report	Pts: Dech, Hannahs, Johnson 23; Rebs: Dech, McCarron 9 Asts: McCarron 6	Attendance: 10,272

15 April 2022	New Zealand Breakers	86–88	Tasmania JackJumpers	MyState Bank Arena, Hobart
19:30	Scoring by quarter: 22–28, 22–17, 26–23, 16–20
ESPN	Pts: Loe 27; Rebs: Loe 7 Asts: Besson 7	boxscore report	Pts: Adams 23; Rebs: Kenyon, Magette, McIntosh, McVeigh 6 Asts: Magette 8	Attendance: closed event
Note: Original date - 19 January 2022

16 April 2022	Melbourne United	88–79	Brisbane Bullets	John Cain Arena, Melbourne
17:30	Scoring by quarter: 23–26, 22–20, 16–15, 27–18
ESPN	Pts: Lual-Acuil 25; Rebs: Lual-Acuil 13; Asts: Ili 8	boxscore report	Pts: Patterson 23; Rebs: Patterson 10; Asts: Cadee 6	Attendance: 5,721

16 April 2022	Perth Wildcats	106–87	Cairns Taipans	RAC Arena, Perth
18:00	Scoring by quarter: 30–29, 25–19, 26–19, 25–20
ESPN	Pts: Cotton 22; Rebs: Blanchfield 7 Asts: Cotton 10	boxscore report	Pts: Pinder 24; Rebs: Pinder 8 Asts: McCall 11	Attendance: 10,314
Note: Original date - 10 February 2022

17 April 2022	South East Melbourne Phoenix	80–84	Tasmania JackJumpers	John Cain Arena, Melbourne
13:00	Scoring by quarter: 19–19, 29–17, 18–32, 14–16
10 Peach	Pts: Creek 27; Rebs: Creek 7 Asts: Munford 5	boxscore report	Pts: McVeigh 26; Rebs: McVeigh 9 Asts: Krslovic 6	Attendance: 3,056

17 April 2022	Sydney Kings	82–90	Adelaide 36ers	Qudos Bank Arena, Sydney
15:00	Scoring by quarter: 21–19, 19–19, 21–24, 21–28
10 Peach	Pts: Adams 28; Rebs: Cooks 14; Asts: Adams 4	boxscore report	Pts: Hannahs 22; Rebs: Johnson 12; Asts: Hannahs 4	Attendance: 10,260

18 April 2022	Melbourne United	92–80	Cairns Taipans	John Cain Arena, Melbourne
19:30	Scoring by quarter: 19–18, 29–21, 20–14, 24–27
ESPN	Pts: Goulding 27; Rebs: Hukporti 9 Asts: Ili 8	boxscore report	Pts: Ayre 20; Rebs: Pinder 9 Asts: Ayre 10	Attendance: 6,042
Note: Original date - 12 February 2022

=== Round 21 ===
21 April 2022	Cairns Taipans	77–87	Sydney Kings	Cairns Convention Centre, Cairns
19:30	Scoring by quarter: 17–18, 26–25, 6–19, 28–25
ESPN	Pts: McCall 22; Rebs: Pinder 14; Asts: McCall 4	boxscore report	Pts: Clark 21; Rebs: Cooks 12; Asts: Bruce 4	Attendance: 3,150

22 April 2022	South East Melbourne Phoenix	94–91	Adelaide 36ers	John Cain Arena, Melbourne
19:30	Scoring by quarter: 19–22, 22–27, 19–25, 34–17
ESPN	Pts: Gliddon 24; Rebs: Ashley 11; Asts: Munford 7	boxscore report	Pts: Dech 20; Rebs: Johnson 6 Asts: Dech, Dufelmeier 6	Attendance: 4,673
Note: Original date - 5 February 2022

22 April 2022	Perth Wildcats	77–82	Illawarra Hawks	RAC Arena, Perth
19:30	Scoring by quarter: 24–24, 21–26, 17–17, 15–15
ESPN	Pts: Cotton 25; Rebs: Majok 10; Asts: Norton 8	boxscore report	Pts: Harvey 22; Rebs: Cleveland, S.Froling 11; Asts: Rathan-Mayes 4	Attendance: 10,251

23 April 2022	Tasmania JackJumpers	83–61	Melbourne United	MyState Bank Arena, Hobart
17:30	Scoring by quarter: 18–20, 15–17, 29–9, 21–15
ESPN	Pts: McIntosh 20; Rebs: McVeigh 10; Asts: Magette 6	boxscore report	Pts: Agada 22; Rebs: Agada, Lual-Acuil 8 Asts: Goulding 3	Attendance: 4,865

23 April 2022	Cairns Taipans	112–98	Brisbane Bullets	Cairns Convention Centre, Cairns
20:00	Scoring by quarter: 20–25, 29–18, 32–18, 31–37
ESPN	Pts: McCall 42; Rebs: Pinder 7 Asts: McCall 10	boxscore report	Pts: Franks 30; Rebs: Franks 15; Asts: Cadee, Drmic 7	Attendance: 3,552

24 April 2022	New Zealand Breakers	60–93	Adelaide 36ers	MyState Bank Arena, Hobart
13:00	Scoring by quarter: 16–21, 18–20, 8–23, 18–29
10 Peach	Pts: Bach, Randle 14; Rebs: Loe 10; Asts: Siva 7	boxscore report	Pts: Dech 19; Rebs: Dech, Sotto, Withers 7 Asts: Dufelmeier 5	Attendance: closed event

24 April 2022	Sydney Kings	84–87	Illawarra Hawks	Qudos Bank Arena, Sydney
15:00	Scoring by quarter: 18–32, 25–24, 28–17, 13–14
10 Peach	Pts: Cooks 20; Rebs: Cooks 14; Asts: Clark 6	boxscore report	Pts: Jessup 24; Rebs: Cleveland, Reath 6 Asts: Rathan-Mayes 4	Attendance: 12,632

24 April 2022	Perth Wildcats	100–102(OT)	South East Melbourne Phoenix	RAC Arena, Perth
15:30	Scoring by quarter: 25–22, 27–24, 17–20, 21–24, Overtime: 10–12
ESPN	Pts: Cotton 28; Rebs: Hodgson 10; Asts: Cotton 8	boxscore report	Pts: Munford 24; Rebs: Pineau 8 Asts: Munford 10	Attendance: 10,271

== Ladder ==
Pos	2021–22 NBL season											
Pos	Team	Pld	W	L	PCT	Last 5	Streak	Home	Away	PF	PA	PP
1	Melbourne United	28	20	8	71.43%	4–1	L1	9–5	11–3	2455	2244	109.40%
2	Illawarra Hawks	28	19	9	67.86%	4–1	W2	8–6	11–3	2498	2345	106.52%
3	Sydney Kings	28	19	9	67.86%	3–2	L1	9–5	10–4	2397	2313	103.63%
4	Tasmania JackJumpers	28	17	11	60.71%	4–1	W4	8–6	9–5	2230	2220	100.45%
5	Perth Wildcats	28	16	12	57.14%	2–3	L2	7–7	9–5	2495	2377	104.96%
6	S.E. Melbourne Phoenix	28	15	13	53.57%	3–2	W2	7–7	8–6	2456	2424	101.32%
7	Adelaide 36ers	28	10	18	35.71%	3–2	W1	6–8	4–10	2283	2346	97.31%
8	Brisbane Bullets	28	10	18	35.71%	2–3	L2	6–8	4–10	2379	2500	95.16%
9	Cairns Taipans	28	9	19	32.14%	1–4	W1	5–9	4–10	2228	2408	92.52%
10	New Zealand Breakers	28	5	23	17.86%	0–5	L10	2–12	3–11	2234	2478	90.15%

Updated to match(es) played on 24 April 2022. Source: NBL.com.au

=== Ladder progression ===
- Numbers highlighted in green indicate that the team finished the round inside the top four.
- Numbers highlighted in blue indicates the team finished first on the ladder in that round.
- Numbers highlighted in red indicates the team finished last place on the ladder in that round.

2021–22 NBL season
Team	1	2	3	4	5	6	7	8	9	10	11	12	13	14	15	16	17	18	19	20	21
Adelaide 36ers	8	6	8	8	8	8	7	8	8	8	8	7	8	8	8	8	8	9	9	8	7
Brisbane Bullets	7	5	7	6	6	7	6	5	7	9	7	8	7	7	7	7	7	7	7	7	8
Cairns Taipans	9	7	4	4	5	5	5	6	9	7	9	10	9	9	10	9	9	8	8	9	9
Illawarra Hawks	3	2	3	3	3	3	3	4	4	5	4	5	4	4	5	4	4	3	3	3	2
Melbourne United	6	9	6	5	4	4	1	1	2	3	1	1	1	1	1	1	1	1	1	1	1
New Zealand Breakers	10	10	10	10	10	10	10	10	10	10	10	9	10	10	9	10	10	10	10	10	10
Perth Wildcats	2	3	1	1	1	1	2	2	3	1	2	3	3	3	2	2	3	4	4	4	5
S.E. Melbourne Phoenix	1	1	2	2	2	2	4	3	1	2	3	2	2	2	4	5	5	6	6	6	6
Sydney Kings	5	4	5	7	7	6	8	7	5	6	5	4	5	5	3	3	2	2	2	2	3
Tasmania JackJumpers	4	8	9	9	9	9	9	9	6	4	6	6	6	6	6	6	6	5	5	5	4

Preceded by 2020–21 season	NBL seasons 2021–22	Succeeded by 2022–23 season
