= Alain Digbeu =

French basketball player (born 1975)

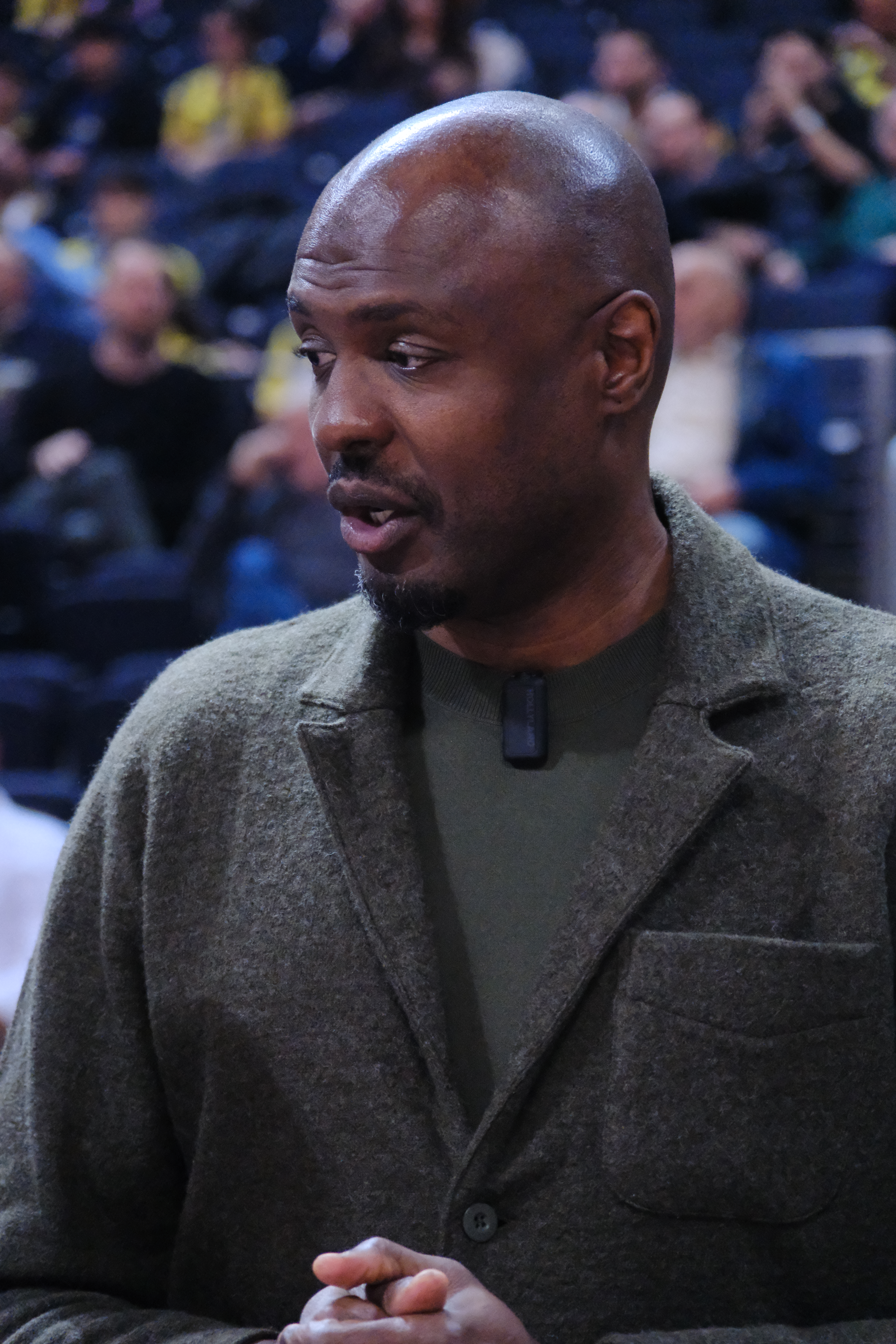
- Digbeu in 2026

Personal information
- Born: 13 November 1975 (age 50) Mâcon, Saône-et-Loire, France
- Listed height: 6 ft 6 in (1.98 m)
- Listed weight: 220 lb (100 kg)

Career information
- NBA draft: 1997: 2nd round, 49th overall pick
- Drafted by: Atlanta Hawks
- Playing career: 1993–2011
- Position: Small forward

Career history
- 1993–1999: ASVEL Lyon-Villeurbanne
- 1999–2002: FC Barcelona
- 2002–2003: Real Madrid Baloncesto
- 2003–2004: DKV Joventut
- 2004–2005: Casti Group Varese
- 2005–2006: Etosa Alicante
- 2006–2007: Climamio Bologna
- 2007–2008: Alicante Costablanca
- 2008–2009: Kavala
- 2009: Pau-Orthez
- 2009–2011: Strasbourg IG

Career highlights
- French League French Player's MVP (1999)
- Stats at Basketball Reference

Alain Donald Digbeu (born 13 November 1975) is a French former professional basketball player. He was drafted by the NBA pro club the Atlanta Hawks with the 49th pick in the 1997 NBA draft. He is 6 ft 6 in (1.98 m) in height and 220 lb (100 kg) in weight. He can play at both the shooting guard and small forward positions.

== Professional career ==
At the pro club level, Digbeu played in the French League with ASVEL Lyon-Villeurbanne from 1993 to 1999. With ASVEL he won the French Cup in the years 1996 and 1997. He was also the French League Rising Star Award in 1994 and 1995, a L'Équipe French League French Player's MVP in 1998, and a 3 time French League All-Star (1997, 1998, 1999) with ASVEL. He played in the Spanish League with FC Barcelona from 1999 to 2002 and he won the Spanish League championship and the Spanish Cup championship with Barcelona in the year 2001.

Digbeu has also played with the Spanish club Real Madrid in the 2002–03 season, with the Spanish club Joventut Badalona in the 2003–04 season, and with the Spanish Club CB Lucentum Alicante in the 2005–06 season. He also played in the Italian League with Casti Group Varese in the 2004–05 season and with Climamio Bologna in the 2006–07 season. Digbeu returned to the Spanish team CB Lucentum Alicante for the 2007–08 season.

He signed with the Greek League club Kavala-Panorama for the 2008–09 season.

== National team career ==
Digbeu played for the senior men's French national basketball team at the EuroBasket 1999, the EuroBasket 2001, and the EuroBasket 2003.

== Personal life ==
He is married to Turkish national Burcu Özcan and speaks Turkish fluently. His son, Tom, is also a professional basketball player.
