= Xavier Rathan-Mayes =

Canadian basketball player (born 1994)

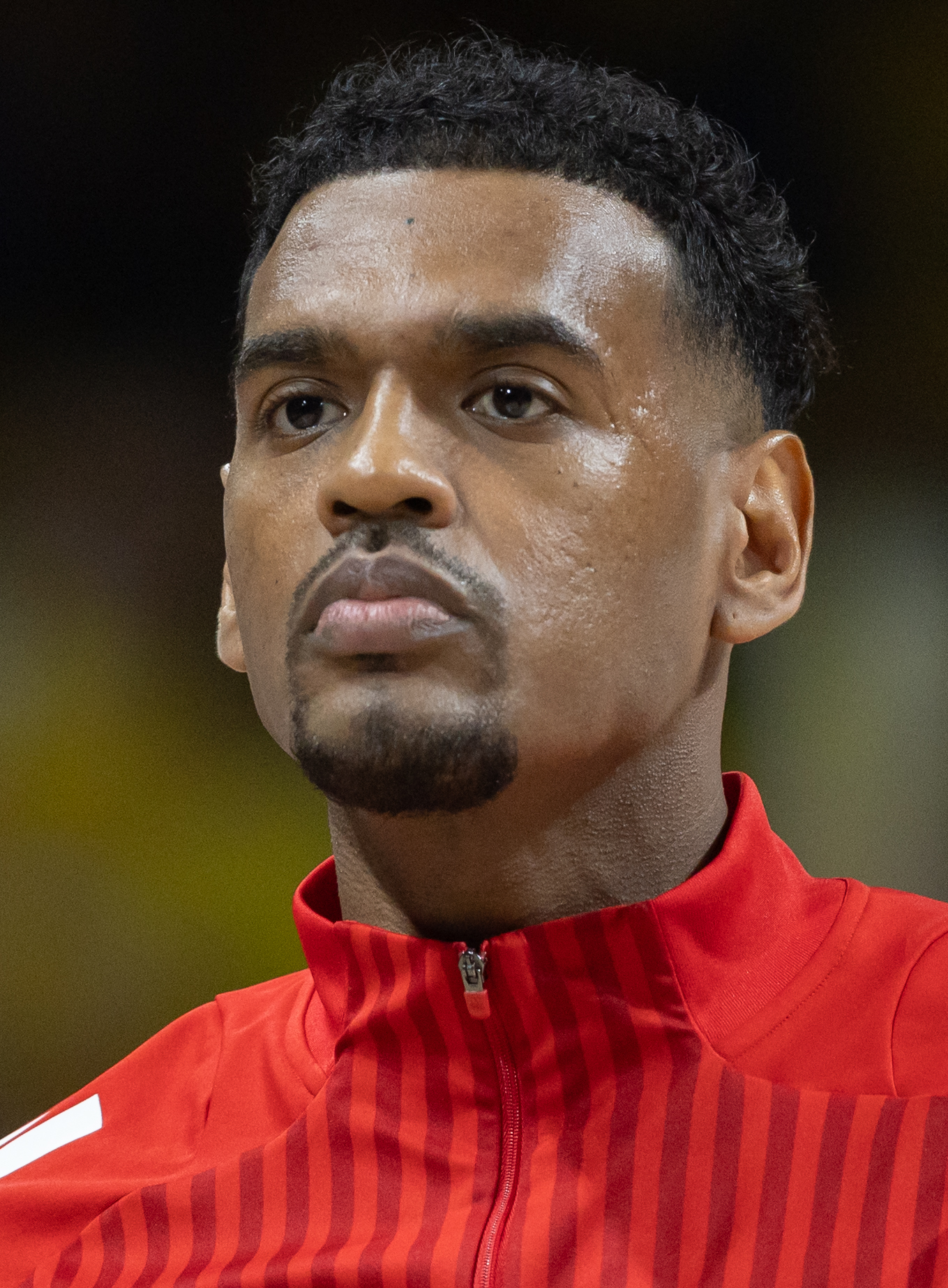
- Rathan-Mayes with Bayern Munich in 2026

No. 8 – UNICS Kazan
- Position: Shooting guard / point guard
- League: VTB United League

Personal information
- Born: April 29, 1994 (age 32) Markham, Ontario, Canada
- Listed height: 6 ft 3 in (1.91 m)
- Listed weight: 207 lb (94 kg)

Career information
- High school: Christian Faith Center Academy (Creedmoor, North Carolina); Huntington Prep (Huntington, West Virginia)
- College: Florida State (2014–2017)
- NBA draft: 2017: undrafted
- Playing career: 2017–present

Career history
- 2017–2018: Westchester Knicks
- 2018: Memphis Grizzlies
- 2018: AEK Athens
- 2019: Texas Legends
- 2019: Bnei Herzliya
- 2019: Hamilton Honey Badgers
- 2019: Texas Legends
- 2019–2020: Agua Caliente Clippers
- 2021: CSU Sibiu
- 2021–2022: Illawarra Hawks
- 2022: Scarborough Shooting Stars
- 2022–2023: Melbourne United
- 2023: Merkezefendi
- 2023–2024: Enisey
- 2024–2025: Real Madrid
- 2025–2026: Bayern Munich
- 2026–present: UNICS Kazan

Career highlights
- Liga ACB champion (2025); VTB United League Top Scorer (2024); ACC All-Defensive team (2017); ACC All-Freshman team (2015)
- Stats at NBA.com
- Stats at Basketball Reference

Xavier Andrew Rathan-Mayes (born April 29, 1994) is a Canadian professional basketball player for UNICS Kazan of the VTB United League. He played college basketball for the Florida State Seminoles.

== High school career ==
Born in Markham, Ontario, he started playing high school basketball at Christian Faith Center Academy in North Carolina. However, the NCAA was declining to accept credits received from the school, prompting him to transfer to Huntington Prep School in West Virginia. At Huntington Prep School, he played with current NBA player Andrew Wiggins, and he was considered a top 30 player in his class (2013).

== College career ==
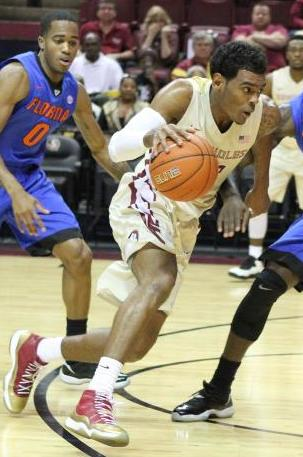
Rathan-Mayes with Florida State in December 2014

Rathan-Mayes played three years of college basketball for the Florida State Seminoles between 2014 and 2017.

As a freshman in 2014–15, Rathan-Mayes had three games with 30 points or more. He averaged 14.9 points per game, becoming only the second freshman to lead Florida State in scoring. He was named to the All-ACC Freshman Team. He averaged 11.8 points in 2015–16 and 10.6 points in 2016–17. In 2017, he graduated from Florida State University with a degree in Sociology.

== Professional career ==
After going undrafted in the 2017 NBA draft, Rathan-Mayes played for the New York Knicks in the NBA Summer League and then joined the Westchester Knicks of the NBA G League for the 2017–18 season. On March 5, 2018, he signed a 10-day contract with the Memphis Grizzlies. He played five games for the Grizzlies.

After playing for the Los Angeles Lakers in the 2018 NBA Summer League, Rathan-Mayes joined AEK Athens of the Greek Basket League for the 2018–19 season. His final game for AEK came on December 29, 2018.

On January 8, 2019, he was acquired by the Texas Legends of the NBA G League. In 25 games played for the Legends, he averaged 14.2 points, 4.6 rebounds, 6 assists and 1.1 steals per game.

On March 28, 2019, he signed with Bnei Herzliya of the Israeli Premier League for the rest of the season. On April 22, 2019, he recorded a season-high 28 points, shooting 6-of-11 from three-point range, along with five rebounds and three assists in a 76–72 win over Ironi Nahariya. He was subsequently named Israeli League Round 28 MVP.

In July and August 2019, Rathan-Mayes played with the Hamilton Honey Badgers of the Canadian Elite Basketball League (CEBL). He helped the team reach the final of the 2019 season, scoring 24 points in a loss to the Saskatchewan Rattlers.

In October 2019, Rathan-Mayes re-joined the Texas Legends. On December 3, 2019, he was acquired by the Agua Caliente Clippers in a trade.

On February 26, 2021, Rathan-Mayes joined CSU Sibiu of the Romanian National League.

On October 18, 2021, Rathan-Mayes signed with the Illawarra Hawks in Australia for the 2021–22 NBL season.

In May 2022, Rathan-Mayes joined the Scarborough Shooting Stars of the CEBL. He played six games between May 26 and June 18.

On August 3, 2022, Rathan-Mayes signed with Melbourne United in Australia for the 2022–23 NBL season. In his debut for United on October 2, 2022, he recorded 33 points, nine rebounds, and five assists in a 101–97 overtime win over the New Zealand Breakers.

On February 9, 2023, he signed with Merkezefendi Bld. Denizli Basket of the Turkish Basketball Super League (BSL).

Rathan-Mayes spent the 2023-2024 campaign with Russian club BC Enisey, averaging a career-high of 25.4 points, 4.2 rebounds and 4.5 assists per game.

On July 12, 2024, Rathan-Mayes signed a two-year contract with Spanish powerhouse Real Madrid, moving to the EuroLeague for the first time in his career.

On July 8, 2026, Rathan-Mayes signed with UNICS Kazan of the VTB United League.

== National team career ==
Rathan-Mayes represented his country, Canada, five games in international competition. He participated at the 2012 U-18 Americas Championship and the 2013 U-19 World Championship.

== Personal life ==
His stepfather is former NBA player Tharon Mayes.

Rathan-Mayes has an Australian wife who lives in Sydney, Australia and they have one daughter.

== Career statistics ==
Legend
GP	Games played	GS	Games started	MPG	Minutes per game
FG%	Field goal percentage	3P%	3-point field goal percentage	FT%	Free throw percentage
RPG	Rebounds per game	APG	Assists per game	SPG	Steals per game
BPG	Blocks per game	PPG	Points per game	**Bold**	Career high

=== NBA Regular season ===
Year	Team	GP	GS	MPG	FG%	3P%	FT%	RPG	APG	SPG	BPG	PPG
2017–18	Memphis	5	0	23.6	.286	.071	.444	1.0	3.6	1.2	.6	5.8
**Career**		5	0	23.6	.286	.071	.444	1.0	3.6	1.2	.6	5.8

=== FIBA Champions League ===
Year	Team	GP	MPG	FG%	3P%	FT%	RPG	APG	SPG	BPG	PPG
2018–19	A.E.K.	8	21.8	.343	.227	.600	2.3	3.6	.4	0	8.5

=== Domestic Leagues ===
==== Regular season ====
Note: Only games in the primary domestic competitions are included. Therefore, games in cup or European competitions are left out.

Year	Team	League	GP	MPG	FG%	3P%	FT%	RPG	APG	SPG	BPG	PPG
2018–19	AEK	GBL	9	21.8	.333	.370	.568	2.3	2.8	.6	0	9.7
2021–22	ILL	NBL	28	23.81	.440	.220	.640	5.57	4.18	0.86	0.18	10.21
2022–23	MEL	NBL	21	29.52	.430	.360	.490	5.57	4.67	1.05	0.14	13.76
