= 2019–20 NBA G League season =

- League: NBA G League
- Sport: Basketball

Draft
- Top draft pick: Anthony Lawrence
- Picked by: Northern Arizona Suns

Regular season
- Season MVP: Frank Mason III (Wisconsin Herd)

NBA G League seasons
- ← 2018–19 2020–21 →

The 2019–20 NBA G League season was the 19th season of the NBA G League, the official minor league basketball organization owned by the National Basketball Association (NBA). The season was suspended indefinitely on March 12, 2020, following the NBA's suspension due to the COVID-19 pandemic. The remainder of the season was cancelled on June 4.

== League changes ==
The Atlanta Hawks' G League franchise that had been playing as the Erie BayHawks since 2017 relocated as planned to College Park, Georgia, following the completion of the Gateway Center Arena and were renamed the College Park Skyhawks. The New Orleans Pelicans then launched its own expansion team for the 2019–20 season that will operate another iteration of the Erie BayHawks, but plan to relocate their G League franchise to Birmingham, Alabama, at a renovated Legacy Arena by 2022.

The Maine Red Claws agreed to a sale to their parent team, the Boston Celtics, after having a hybrid affiliation with the Celtics since 2012.

== Regular season ==
Final standings when the season was curtailed on March 12, 2020:

x – qualified for playoffs; y – Division champion; z – Conference champion

=== Eastern Conference ===
Atlantic Division

Team (affiliate)	W	L	PCT	GB	Home	Road
Maine Red Claws (BOS)	28	14	.667	0	14–6	14–8
Delaware Blue Coats (PHI)	22	21	.512	6.5	10–12	12–9
Raptors 905 (TOR)	22	21	.512	6.5	12–8	10–13
Long Island Nets (BKN)	19	23	.452	9	10–14	9–9
Westchester Knicks (NYK)	17	24	.415	10.5	7–13	10–11

Central Division

Team (affiliate)	W	L	PCT	GB	Home	Road
x – Wisconsin Herd (MIL)	33	10	.767	0	16–7	17–3
x – Canton Charge (CLE)	29	14	.674	4	20–4	9–10
Grand Rapids Drive (DET)	25	18	.581	8	12–7	13–11
Fort Wayne Mad Ants (IND)	21	22	.488	12	16–8	5–14
Windy City Bulls (CHI)	17	26	.395	16	7–13	10–13

Southeast Division

Team (affiliate)	W	L	PCT	GB	Home	Road
Lakeland Magic (ORL)	25	17	.595	0	11–11	14–6
Capital City Go-Go (WAS)	22	21	.512	3.5	14–7	8–14
College Park Skyhawks (ATL)	20	23	.465	5.5	9–10	11–13
Erie BayHawks (NO)	13	30	.302	12.5	8–12	5–18
Greensboro Swarm (CHA)	9	34	.209	16.5	4–17	5–17

=== Western Conference ===
Midwest Division

Team (affiliate)	W	L	PCT	GB	Home	Road
Memphis Hustle (MEM)	26	15	.634	0	14–7	12–8
Sioux Falls Skyforce (MIA)	22	20	.524	4.5	15–7	7–13
Oklahoma City Blue (OKC)	20	22	.476	6.5	12–10	8–12
Iowa Wolves (MIN)	19	24	.442	8	10–13	9–11

Pacific Division

Team (affiliate)	W	L	PCT	GB	Home	Road
Stockton Kings (SAC)	24	19	.558	0	12–8	12–11
Santa Cruz Warriors (GSW)	21	21	.500	2.5	8–12	13–9
Agua Caliente Clippers (LAC)	22	22	.500	2.5	12–10	10–12
South Bay Lakers (LAL)	19	25	.432	5.5	13–6	6–19
Northern Arizona Suns (PHX)	8	34	.190	15.5	3–18	5–16

Southwest Division

Team (affiliate)	W	L	PCT	GB	Home	Road
x – Salt Lake City Stars (UTA)	30	12	.714	0	17–6	13–6
Austin Spurs (SAS)	24	18	.571	6	13–9	11–9
Texas Legends (DAL)	24	19	.558	6.5	12–11	12–8
Rio Grande Valley Vipers (HOU)	15	27	.357	15	6–13	9–14

== Awards ==
=== Player of the Week ===
Date	Player	Ref
November 11–18	Marial Shayok	
November 18–25	Tremont Waters	
November 25–December 2	Dusty Hannahs	
December 2–9	Josh Magette	
December 9–16	Gary Payton II	
December 16–23	PJ Dozier	
December 23–January 6	Dragan Bender	
January 6–13	Tremont Waters	
January 13–20	Mfiondu Kabengele	
January 20–27	Jaylen Adams	
January 27–February 3	Cat Barber	
February 3–10	Theo Pinson	
February 10–March 2	Cameron Payne	
March 2–9	Isaiah Hartenstein	
