= Vic Law =

American basketball player (born 1995)

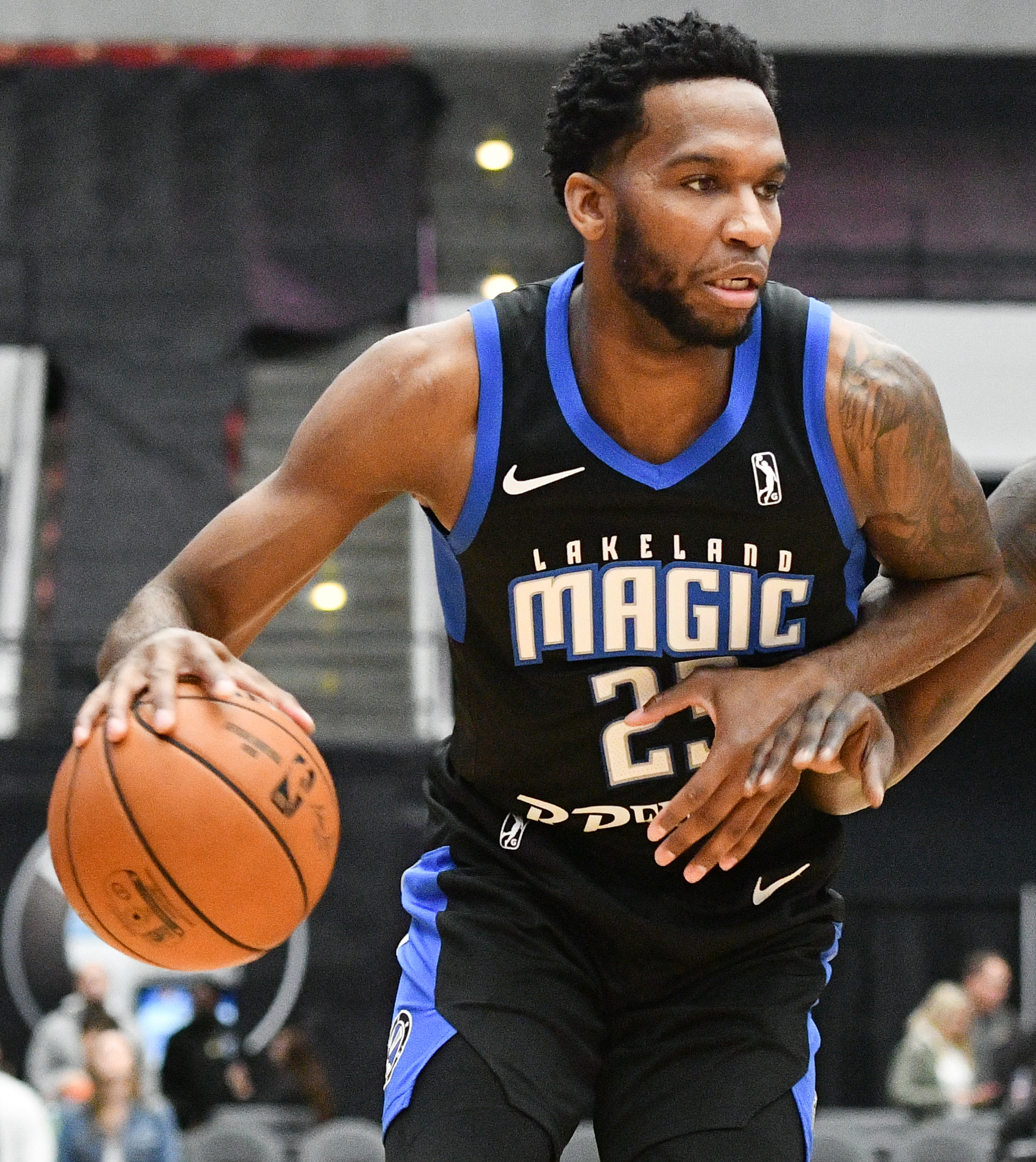
- Law with the Lakeland Magic in 2019

No. 4 – Ibaraki Robots
- Position: Small forward
- League: B.League

Personal information
- Born: December 19, 1995 (age 30) Chicago, Illinois, U.S.
- Listed height: 6 ft 7 in (2.01 m)
- Listed weight: 201 lb (91 kg)

Career information
- High school: St. Rita (Chicago, Illinois)
- College: Northwestern (2014–2019)
- NBA draft: 2019: undrafted
- Playing career: 2019–present

Career history
- 2019–2020: Lakeland Magic
- 2020: Orlando Magic
- 2020: →Lakeland Magic
- 2020–2021: Brisbane Bullets
- 2021–2022: Perth Wildcats
- 2022–2023: Chiba Jets
- 2023–2026: Ryukyu Golden Kings
- 2026–present: Ibaraki Robots

Career highlights
- All-NBL First Team (2022); All-NBA G League Third Team (2020); Big Ten All-Defensive Team (2017)
- Stats at NBA.com
- Stats at Basketball Reference

Victor Lamar Law Jr. (born December 19, 1995) is an American professional basketball player for the Ibaraki Robots of the Japanese B.League. He played college basketball for the Northwestern Wildcats.

== High school career ==
Law was born in Chicago, Illinois and attended St. Rita of Cascia High School. In his sophomore year at St. Rita he was selected in the Catholic League All-Conference team; in his junior year he averaged 14.5 points and 9.5 rebounds, and was selected in the All-State third team. As a high school senior Law was included in the top 100 players in the nation by ESPN (which ranked him 66th), Scout.com (70th), 247Sports.com (89th) and Rivals.com (86th). He received interest from several Division I colleges, and was offered scholarships by Bradley, Creighton, Colorado, Harvard, Providence and Northwestern, among others; he committed to Northwestern on July 4, 2013 and signed on November 13 of the same year.

=== Recruiting ===
College recruiting
Name	Hometown	School	Height	Weight	Commit date
Vic Law; SF	South Holland, IL	St. Rita of Cascia High School	6 ft 6 in (1.98 m)	185 lb (84 kg)	Jul 4, 2013
Vic Law; SF	Recruit ratings: Scout: Rivals: 247Sports: ESPN:				
Overall recruit ranking: Scout: 70 Rivals: 86 ESPN: 66
Note: In many cases, Scout, Rivals, 247Sports, On3, and ESPN may conflict in their listings of height and weight.; In these cases, the average was taken. ESPN grades are on a 100-point scale.; Sources: "2014 Team Ranking". Rivals.

== College career ==
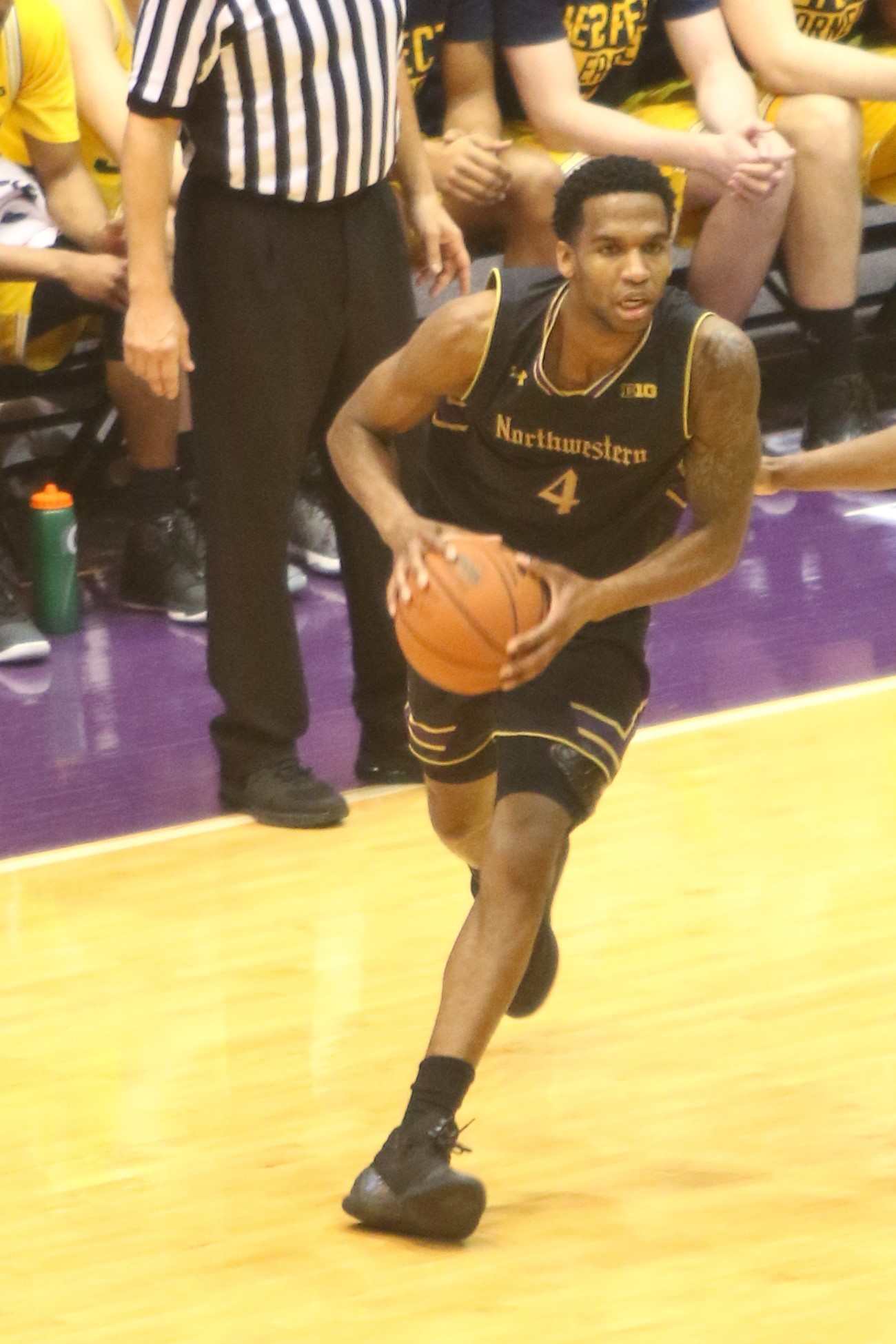
Law at Northwestern in 2017

He joined the Northwestern Wildcats in 2014 after his senior year of high school. He had a strong freshman season, starting 19 games as a freshman and averaging 7.0 points and 4.8 rebounds per game. Law shot 44.2% from behind the arc, which was fifth best in the Big Ten Conference. He tore a labrum in the summer of 2015 and missed the 2015–16 season after undergoing shoulder surgery.

As a redshirt sophomore, Law averaged 12.3 points, 5.8 rebounds and 1.8 assists per game. Law was a Big Ten All-Defensive Team selection in 2017. He helped Northwestern reach the NCAA tournament for the first time in the school's history. During his junior season, he averaged 12.0 points and 5.8 rebounds per game. In March 2018, he underwent an unusual diaphragm surgery to address a deficiency in his lung capacity. As a senior, Law started 30 games and averaged 15.0 points, 6.4 rebounds, 3.0 assists, and 1.03 blocks per game. He was named Academic All-Big Ten for the second year in a row. Law appeared in 125 career games in four seasons at Northwestern, averaging 11.5 points, 5.7 rebounds and 2.0 assists per game.

== Professional career ==
=== Lakeland Magic (2019–2020) ===
After going undrafted in the 2019 NBA draft, Law played for the Orlando Magic in the NBA Summer League and joined them for training camp and preseason. He was allocated by Orlando to their NBA G League affiliate, the Lakeland Magic.

=== Orlando Magic (2020) ===
On January 11, 2020, Law signed a two-way contract with Orlando. Under the terms of the deal, he split time between Orlando and Lakeland. Law was named to the All-NBA G League Third Team. In 33 games for Lakeland during the 2019–20 season, he averaged 19.7 points, 8.1 rebounds and 2.7 assist per game. He also played in eight NBA regular season games and one playoff game with Orlando.

=== Brisbane Bullets (2020–2021) ===
On December 4, 2020, Law signed with the Brisbane Bullets in Australia for the 2020–21 NBL season. He was ruled out for the rest of the season on April 8, 2021, due to a torn tendon in his ankle that required surgery.

For the 2021 NBA Summer League, Law played for the Los Angeles Lakers.

=== Perth Wildcats (2021–2022) ===
On August 27, 2021, Law signed with the Perth Wildcats for the 2021–22 NBL season. In his debut for the Wildcats on December 3, 2021, he scored 37 points in an 85–73 season-opening win over the Adelaide 36ers. His 37 points set the highest score ever by a player in their Perth Wildcats debut. On March 10, 2022, he recorded 20 points and a career-high 18 rebounds in a 97–87 win over Melbourne United. Four days later, he scored a game-high 39 points in a 104–102 overtime win over the New Zealand Breakers. It was the highest-scoring individual effort by any player during the 2021–22 season. On April 21, he was ruled out for the rest of the season after suffering a syndesmosis injury to his right ankle. For the season, he was named to the All-NBL First Team.

=== Chiba Jets Funabashi (2022–present) ===
Law joined the Utah Jazz for the 2022 NBA Summer League and then moved to Japan to play for the Chiba Jets Funabashi in the 2022–23 B.League season.

== Career statistics ==
Legend
GP	Games played	GS	Games started	MPG	Minutes per game
FG%	Field goal percentage	3P%	3-point field goal percentage	FT%	Free throw percentage
RPG	Rebounds per game	APG	Assists per game	SPG	Steals per game
BPG	Blocks per game	PPG	Points per game	**Bold**	Career high

=== NBA ===
Year	Team	GP	GS	MPG	FG%	3P%	FT%	RPG	APG	SPG	BPG	PPG
2019–20	Orlando	8	0	7.8	.333	.143	.333	1.4	.4	.3	.0	1.9
Career		8	0	7.8	.333	.143	.333	1.4	.4	.3	.0	1.9

=== College ===
Year	Team	GP	GS	MPG	FG%	3P%	FT%	RPG	APG	SPG	BPG	PPG
2014–15	Northwestern	32	19	24.4	.387	.355	.766	4.8	1.3	.7	.5	7.0
2015–16	Northwestern	Redshirt										
2016–17	Northwestern	**36**	**36**	32.1	.403	**.399**	.738	5.8	1.8	**1.1**	.5	12.3
2017–18	Northwestern	27	27	31.6	**.418**	.383	**.824**	5.8	2.2	**1.1**	.6	12.0
2018–19	Northwestern	30	30	**33.4**	.396	.335	.786	**6.4**	**3.0**	1.0	**1.0**	**15.0**
Career		125	112	30.3	.402	.368	.774	5.7	2.0	1.0	.6	11.5
