= Josh Magette =

American basketball player (born 1989)

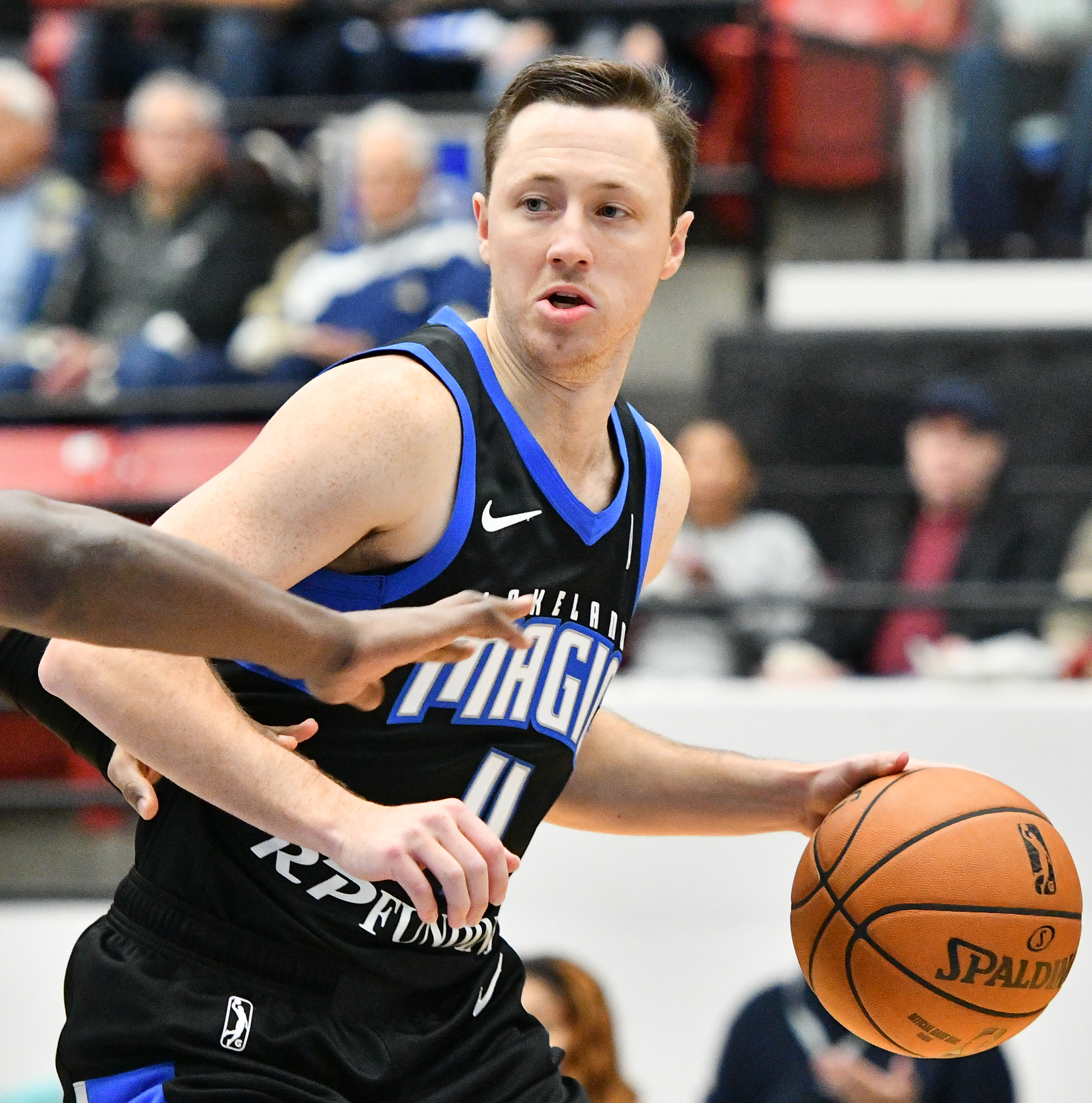
- Magette with the Lakeland Magic in 2019

Personal information
- Born: November 28, 1989 (age 36) Birmingham, Alabama, U.S.
- Listed height: 6 ft 1 in (1.85 m)
- Listed weight: 160 lb (73 kg)

Career information
- High school: Spain Park (Hoover, Alabama)
- College: Alabama–Huntsville (2008–2012)
- NBA draft: 2012: undrafted
- Playing career: 2012–2023
- Position: Point guard
- Number: 2, 4, 7, 9, 11

Career history
- 2012–2013: Landstede Zwolle
- 2013–2014: Los Angeles D-Fenders
- 2014–2015: Koroivos Amaliadas
- 2015–2017: Los Angeles D-Fenders
- 2017–2018: Atlanta Hawks
- 2017–2018: →Erie BayHawks
- 2018: Cedevita Zagreb
- 2018–2019: Gran Canaria
- 2019–2020: Orlando Magic
- 2019–2020: →Lakeland Magic
- 2020: Lakeland Magic
- 2020–2021: Darüşşafaka Tekfen
- 2021–2023: Tasmania JackJumpers

Career highlights
- NBA D-League All-Star (2017); 2× All-NBA G League Second Team (2017, 2020); NBA G League assists leader (2018); Dutch Basketball League steals leader (2013); 2× First-team Division II All-American (2011, 2012); Gulf South Co-Player of the Year (2012); First-team All-Gulf South (2012); First-team All-Gulf South East Division (2011); Second-team All-Gulf South East Division (2010); Gulf South East Division Freshman of the Year (2009); Gulf South tournament MVP (2012)
- Stats at NBA.com
- Stats at Basketball Reference

Joshua Adam Magette (born November 28, 1989) is an American former professional basketball player who played for the Atlanta Hawks and Orlando Magic in the National Basketball Association (NBA), and for several overseas teams. He played college basketball for the University of Alabama in Huntsville.

== Early life ==
Born in Birmingham, Alabama, he graduated from Spain Park High School in Hoover, Alabama. He spent his collegiate career at the University of Alabama in Huntsville where he led the Chargers to three Gulf South Conference championships and two NCAA Men's Division II Basketball Championship Elite Eight appearances. He ended his career as the school's and the Gulf South Conference's all-time leader in assists.

== Professional career ==
=== Landstede Basketbal (2012–2013) ===
After going undrafted in the 2012 NBA draft, Magette joined the Memphis Grizzlies for the 2012 NBA Summer League, but did not appear in any games for the team. In August 2012, he signed with Landstede Basketbal of the Netherlands for the 2012–13 season. In 39 games for Landstede, he averaged 11.5 points, 2.8 rebounds, 5.7 assists and 2.5 steals per game.

=== Los Angeles D-Fenders (2013–2014) ===
On November 1, 2013, Magette was selected in the second round of the 2013 NBA Development League draft by the Los Angeles D-Fenders. In 52 games for the D-Fenders in 2013–14, he averaged 10.4 points, 3.5 rebounds, 6.9 assists and 1.9 steals per game.

=== Koroivos Amaliadas (2014–2015) ===
In July 2014, Magette joined the Orlando Magic for the 2014 NBA Summer League. On August 14, 2014, he signed with the Greek League club Koroivos Amaliadas. In 28 games for Koroivos in 2014–15, he averaged 7.1 points, 3.5 rebounds, 4.8 assists and 1.4 steals per game.

=== Return to the D-Fenders (2015–2017) ===
On October 31, 2015, Magette was acquired by the Los Angeles D-Fenders, returning to the franchise for a second stint. In 54 games for the D-Fenders in 2015–16, he averaged 12.1 points, 4.4 rebounds, 8.8 assists and 2.4 steals per game.

In July 2016, Magette joined the Brooklyn Nets for the 2016 NBA Summer League. On October 3, 2016, he signed with the Atlanta Hawks, but was waived on October 22 after appearing in three preseason games. On October 30, he was reacquired by the Los Angeles D-Fenders.

=== Atlanta Hawks (2017–2018) ===
In June 2017, Magette joined the Atlanta Hawks for the 2017 NBA Summer League. On September 6, two months after a successful Summer League stint, he was signed to the Hawks as the team's first-ever two-way contract. Under the terms of the deal, he split time between the Hawks and their new G League affiliate, the Erie BayHawks. Magette made his NBA debut on October 18, 2017, in a 117–111 victory over the Dallas Mavericks where he sank his first NBA shot attempt, a 29-foot three-pointer. He had another phenomenal year in the G League, averaging 15.1 points, 10.2 assists, 3.3 rebounds and 1.2 steals. Additionally, he had a solid rookie season in the NBA averaging over 3 assists per game.

=== Cedevita Zagreb (2018) ===
On June 27, 2018, it was announced that he will join the Golden State Warriors for the 2018 NBA Summer League. On July 27, 2018, he signed with Croatian club Cedevita Zagreb. On November 10, 2018, he was released by Cedevita.

=== Gran Canaria (2018–2019) ===
On December 25, 2018, Magette agreed to join EuroLeague team CB Gran Canaria.

Magette played for the Memphis Grizzlies during the 2019 NBA Summer League.

=== Orlando Magic (2019–2020) ===
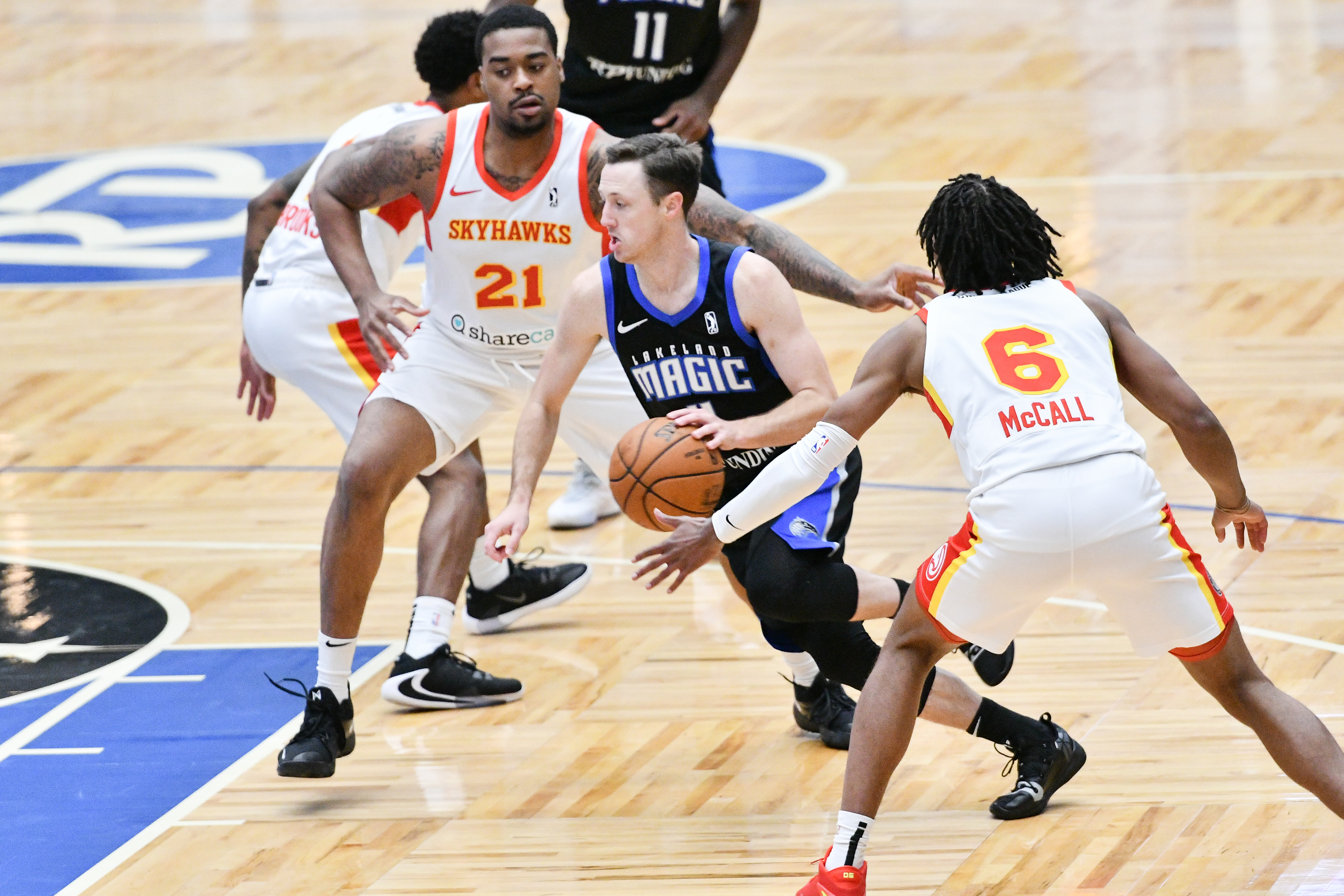
Magette with the Lakeland Magic in November 2019

On July 17, 2019, the Orlando Magic agreed to sign Magette to a two-way contract. On July 23, the deal was officially announced. On January 11, 2020, the Magic signed with Magette a 10-day contract, but was later waived by the team on January 14, 2020.

=== Lakeland Magic (2020) ===
The Lakeland Magic re-signed Magette after his release from the parent club. In his G League return, he registered 24 points, six assists, two rebounds, two steals and a block in a game against the Canton Charge. Magette was named Midseason All-NBA G League for the Eastern Conference. On March 11, he posted 25 points, 15 assists, eight rebounds and two steals in a win over the Erie BayHawks. Magette averaged 21.1 points, 10.6 assists, 4.1 rebounds and 2.0 steals per game during the 2019–20 G League season. He was named to the All-NBA G League Second Team.

=== Darüşşafaka (2020–2021) ===
On December 6, 2020, Magette signed with Darüşşafaka of the Basketball Super League.

=== Tasmania JackJumpers (2021–2023) ===
On July 28, 2021, Magette signed with the Tasmania JackJumpers for the 2021–22 NBL season. He helped the JackJumpers reach the NBL Grand Final in their first season.

On June 8, 2022, Magette re-signed with the JackJumpers for the 2022–23 NBL season. He underwent season-ending surgery in February 2023 to repair a broken cheekbone and fractured eye socket.

On October 2, 2023, Magette announced his retirement from basketball.

== NBA career statistics ==
Legend
GP	Games played	GS	Games started	MPG	Minutes per game
FG%	Field goal percentage	3P%	3-point field goal percentage	FT%	Free throw percentage
RPG	Rebounds per game	APG	Assists per game	SPG	Steals per game
BPG	Blocks per game	PPG	Points per game	**Bold**	Career high

=== Regular season ===
Year	Team	GP	GS	MPG	FG%	3P%	FT%	RPG	APG	SPG	BPG	PPG
2017–18	Atlanta	**18**	0	**12.0**	.326	**.364**	**1.000**	**1.1**	**3.2**	**.4**	**.1**	**2.6**
2019–20	Orlando	8	0	4.8	**.333**	.250	.500	.8	.6	**.4**	**.1**	1.5
Career		26	0	9.8	.328	.346	.900	1.0	2.4	.4	.1	2.2

== National team career ==
Magette played with the senior USA men's national team in early 2020, against Puerto Rico, at the 2021 FIBA AmeriCup qualification. Team USA faced Puerto Rico twice and won both games. He was also named to the 2021 USA Select Team, which trains with the men's Olympic basketball team.
