= Dusty Hannahs =

American basketball player (born 1993)

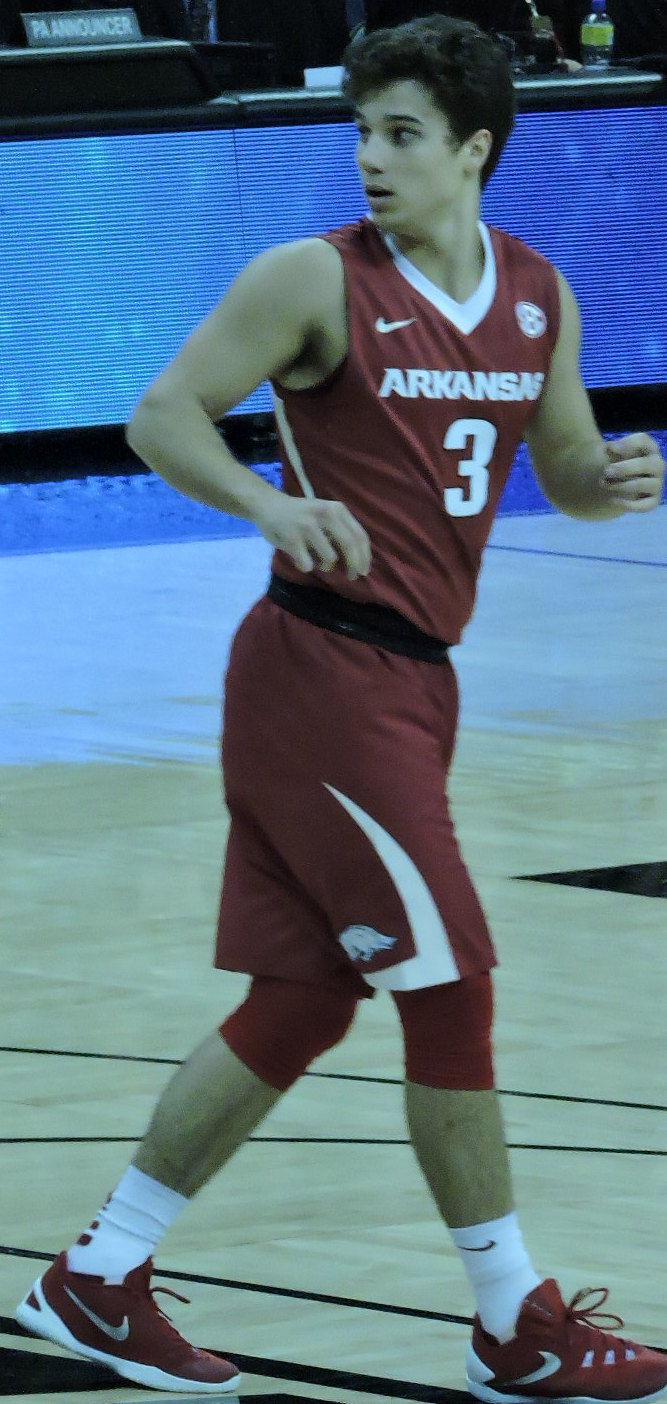
- Hannahs with the Arkansas Razorbacks in 2015

No. 9 – Bnei Herzliya
- Position: Shooting guard
- League: Israeli Basketball Premier League

Personal information
- Born: September 2, 1993 (age 33) Little Rock, Arkansas, U.S.
- Listed height: 6 ft 3 in (1.91 m)
- Listed weight: 210 lb (95 kg)

Career information
- High school: Pulaski Academy (Little Rock, Arkansas)
- College: Texas Tech (2012–2014); Arkansas (2015–2017)
- NBA draft: 2017: undrafted
- Playing career: 2017–present

Career history
- 2017–2020: Memphis Hustle
- 2019–2020: Memphis Grizzlies
- 2020: Kolossos Rodou
- 2021–2022: Adelaide 36ers
- Ironi Ness Ziona
- 2024: Hapoel Tel Aviv
- 2024: Mexico City Capitanes
- 2024–2025: Hapoel Eilat
- 2026–present: Bnei Herzliya

Career highlights
- All-NBA G League Third Team (2020)
- Stats at NBA.com
- Stats at Basketball Reference

Gerald Ellis "Dusty" Hannahs III (born September 2, 1993) is an American-Israeli professional basketball player for Bnei Herzliya of the Israeli Basketball Premier League. He played college basketball for Texas Tech and Arkansas, with whom in his senior season he led the Southeastern Conference with a 90.8% free throw percentage.

== Early life and high school ==
Hannahs was born and raised in Little Rock, Arkansas and attended high school at Pulaski Academy. He was a three-time All-District selection, and was named first team 4A All-State in his junior and senior seasons with the Bruins. He committed to Texas Tech University after his junior season after averaging 26.2 points per game and shooting 51 percent from three. In his senior season, Hannahs averaged 20 points per game, and led PA to the 4A state championship game and scored 43 points in a loss to Clarksville High School.

== College career ==
=== Texas Tech ===
Hannahs began his collegiate career at Texas Tech. He averaged 6.9 points as a freshman and 7.7 points per game as a sophomore, while appearing mostly as a three-point specialist and sixth man off the bench. He set the Texas Tech season record for free throw percentage with 92.3 in his sophomore season. Following the end of the season, Hannahs announced that he would be transferring to the University of Arkansas.

=== Arkansas ===
Hannahs played for the Arkansas Razorbacks for the final two seasons of his eligibility after sitting out one year due to NCAA transfer rules. In his first season with the team, Hannahs led the Razorbacks with 16.5 points per game (8th in the SEC), had a .458 field goal percentage (8th), and led the Southeastern Conference (SEC) with 81 three pointers made, and .870 free throw percentage, and a .433 three-point percentage. He was named to the Jerry West Award watchlist going into his redshirt senior season.

Hannahs again led Arkansas in scoring in his final season with 14.4 points per game and led the Southeastern Conference (SEC) with a 90.8% free throw percentage (10th-best in the nation) and was named second team All-SEC by NBCSports.com. He scored 1,047 points for the Razorbacks, becoming the fifth Arkansas player to score 1,000 points in two seasons, and finished ninth in school history with 155 three pointers made and with the third-best free throw percentage at .889.

== Professional career ==
=== Memphis Hustle / Grizzlies (2017–2020) ===
Hannahs originally committed to play overseas for AZS Koszalin of the Polish Basketball League, but ultimately opted to sign with the Memphis Hustle of the NBA G League on October 6, 2017. In his first professional season, Hannahs appeared mostly as the Hustle's sixth man and averaged 9.2 points per game while shooting 44.1 percent on three point shots and 90.5 percent from the free throw line.

Hannahs returned to the Hustle for a second season and was the only player on from the previous year's team on the roster. He averaged 14.5 points, 1.8 rebounds, and 1.4 assists in 49 games, again as the Hustle's primary option off the bench, and led the G League with a 92.6 free throw percentage. Following the end of the season, Hannahs participated in the 2019 G-League Elite Camp along with other top G League players and college prospects.

On March 30, 2019, the Memphis Grizzlies signed Hannahs to a 10-day contract. Hannahs made his NBA debut on March 31, 2019, in a 113–96 loss to the Los Angeles Clippers, scoring four points on 2-of-7 shooting with four assists and one rebound in 13 minutes of play. He was waived by the Grizzlies on April 4, 2019, after appearing in two games, scoring eight points with a rebound and five assists. Following the end of the NBA season, Hannahs was named to the Grizzlies roster for the 2019 NBA Summer League.

Hannahs was named to the NBA G League Elite Team for the G League International Challenge in Montevideo, Uruguay. He averaged 14 points per game in the tournament, including a 21-point performance off the bench in the quarterfinals against the Uruguayan League Elite team, as the G League Elite eventually fell in the final to Bayern Munich of the EuroLeague.

Hannahs was re-signed by the Grizzlies on October 14, 2019, but was waived the next day.

On October 27, 2019, Hannahs returned to the Hustle for a third season. Hannahs was named the G League Player of the Week on December 2, 2019, after scoring 28 points against the Oklahoma City Blue and 32 points against the Maine Red Claws. Hannahs was named Midseason All-NBA G League for the Western Conference. Hannahs averaged a team-leading 21.4 points per game on the season and was named third team All-NBA G League.

Hannahs was signed to a second 10-day contract on February 21, 2020. Hannahs was later waived by the Grizzlies on February 27, 2020.

=== Kolossos Rodou (2020) ===
On November 27, 2020, Hannahs signed with Kolossos Rodou of the Greek Basket League. On December 22, 2020, Hannahs parted ways with the Greek club citing family matters overseas.

=== Santa Cruz Warriors (2021) ===
On January 11, 2021, the Memphis Hustle announced that they had acquired the returning rights to David Stockton from the South Bay Lakers in exchange for the returning rights to Hannahs'. His returning rights was later traded to the Santa Cruz Warriors for a 2022 first round pick. The next day, Hannahs was included in the roster of the Warriors.

=== Adelaide 36ers (2021–2022) ===
On July 20, 2021, Hannahs signed with the Adelaide 36ers for the 2021–22 NBL season. He averaged 13.5 points per game and shot 94% from the free throw line.

=== Return to Santa Cruz (2022–2023) ===
On October 24, 2022, Hannahs rejoined the Santa Cruz Warriors roster for training camp.

=== Ironi Hai Motors Nes Ziona (2023–2024) ===
In July, 2023, Hannahs signed with Ironi Nes Ziona of the Israeli Basketball Premier League. During the Gaza war, Hannahs has refused to return to Israel and continue to play for Ness Ziona.

=== Hapoel Tel Aviv (2024) ===
In February 2024, Hannahs signed with Hapoel Tel Aviv of the Israeli Basketball Premier League.

=== Mexico City Capitanes (2024) ===
On December 20, 2024, Hannahs joined the Mexico City Capitanes of the NBA G League, but was waived six days later.

=== Hapoel Yossi Avrahami Eilat (2025–2026) ===
On January 7, 2025, Hannahs signed with Hapoel Eilat of the Israeli Premier League.

== Personal life ==
Hannahs is the son of former Arkansas and MLB pitcher Gerry Hannahs. Hannahs' father nicknamed him "Dusty" after former Los Angeles Dodgers teammate Dusty Baker.

== Career statistics ==
Legend
GP	Games played	GS	Games started	MPG	Minutes per game
FG%	Field goal percentage	3P%	3-point field goal percentage	FT%	Free throw percentage
RPG	Rebounds per game	APG	Assists per game	SPG	Steals per game
BPG	Blocks per game	PPG	Points per game	**Bold**	Career high

=== NBA ===
==== Regular season ====
Year	Team	GP	GS	MPG	FG%	3P%	FT%	RPG	APG	SPG	BPG	PPG
2018–19	Memphis	**2**	0	**13.0**	.250	.000	**1.000**	**.5**	**2.5**	**.5**	.0	4.0
2019–20	Memphis	**2**	0	6.5	**.444**	**.667**	**1.000**	**.5**	.0	.0	.0	**6.0**
Career		4	0	9.8	.333	.250	1.000	.5	1.3	.3	.0	5.0

=== College ===
Year	Team	GP	GS	MPG	FG%	3P%	FT%	RPG	APG	SPG	BPG	PPG
2012–13	Texas Tech	31	17	22.4	.393	.374	.806	1.1	.4	.5	0.0	6.9
2013–14	Texas Tech	32	10	22.1	.378	.369	**.923**	1.3	**1.4**	.4	0.0	7.7
2014–15	Arkansas	Did not play – transfer										
2015–16	Arkansas	32	20	**27.1**	**.458**	**.433**	.870	**2.4**	.9	**.6**	0.0	**16.5**
2016–17	Arkansas	**37**	**23**	24.7	.439	.387	.908	1.7	1.2	.4	**.1**	14.4
Career		131	70	24.1	.428	.395	.888	1.7	.9	.5	0.0	11.5
