= Robert Franks (basketball) =

American basketball player (born 1996)

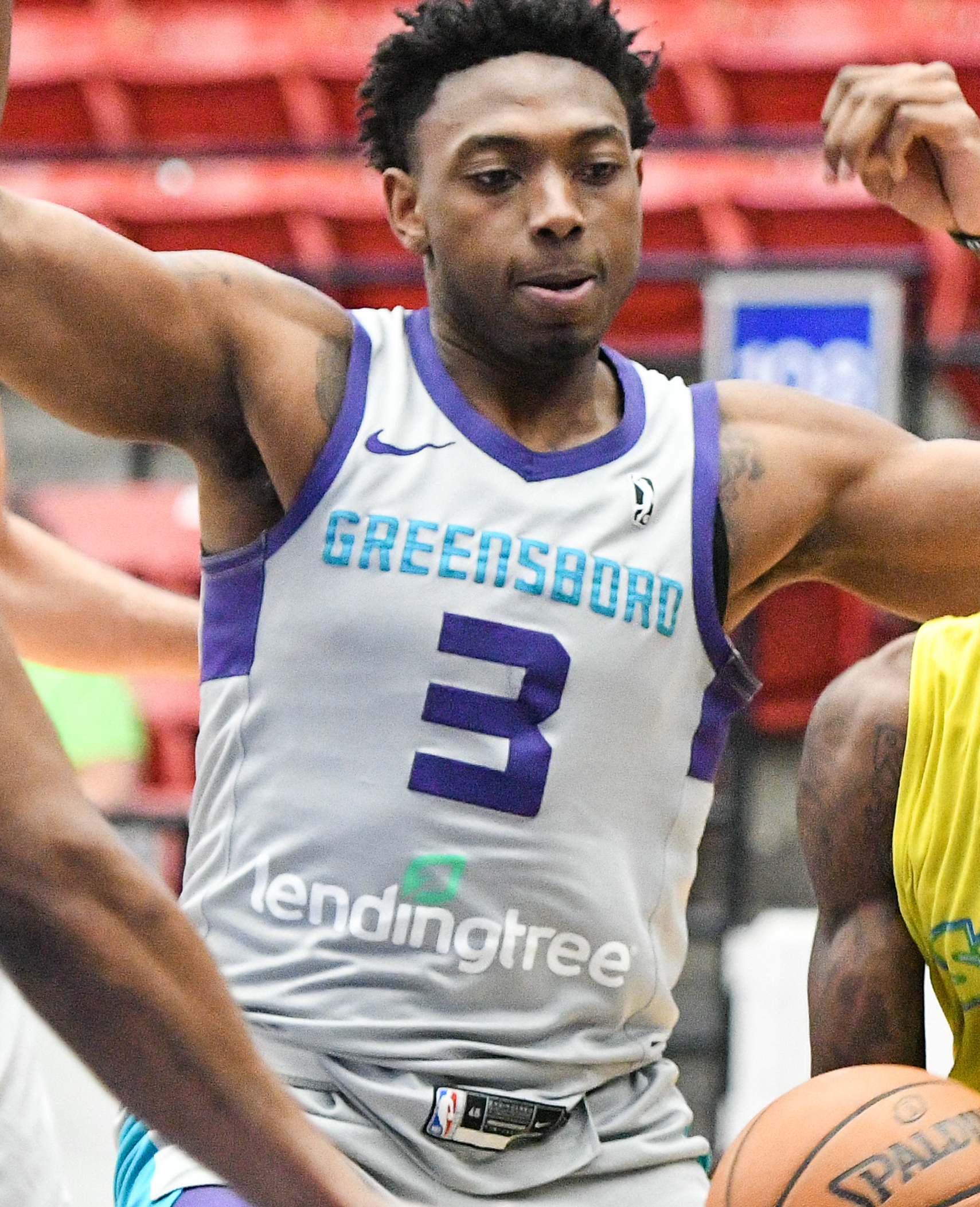
- Franks with the Greensboro Swarm in 2019

No. 8 – Partizan Belgrade
- Position: Power forward
- League: Serbian SuperLeague; ABA League; EuroLeague

Personal information
- Born: December 18, 1996 (age 29) Seattle, Washington, U.S.
- Listed height: 6 ft 8 in (2.03 m)
- Listed weight: 235 lb (107 kg)

Career information
- High school: Evergreen (Vancouver, Washington)
- College: Washington State (2015–2019)
- NBA draft: 2019: undrafted
- Playing career: 2019–present

Career history
- 2019–2020: Greensboro Swarm
- 2020: Stockton Kings
- 2021: Lakeland Magic
- 2021: Orlando Magic
- 2021–2022: Brisbane Bullets
- 2022–2023: Adelaide 36ers
- 2023: Hapoel Gilboa Galil
- 2023–2024: Nagoya Diamond Dolphins
- 2024–2026: Ibaraki Robots
- 2026: Nanjing Monkey Kings
- 2026–present: Partizan

Career highlights
- NBA G League champion (2021); First-team All-Pac-12 (2019); Pac-12 Most Improved Player (2018)
- Stats at NBA.com
- Stats at Basketball Reference

Robert Christopher Franks Jr. (born December 18, 1996) is an American professional basketball player for Partizan of the Serbian SuperLeague, the ABA League, and the EuroLeague. He played college basketball for the Washington State Cougars.

== Early life ==
Franks grew up in Vancouver, Washington and attended Evergreen High School, where he was a captain of the school's basketball team for his final three years. As a junior, he averaged 19 points and eight rebounds per game and was named All-Region by The Columbian and honorable mention Class 4A All-State by the Associated Press. Rated a three star recruit and one of the 25 top recruits in the state by The Seattle Times, Franks committed to play college basketball at Washington State University going into his senior year. Franks was again named All-Region and honorable mention All-State as a senior.

== College career ==
Franks played four seasons for the Washington State Cougars, playing exclusively off the bench during his first two years with the team. He appeared in 23 games as a freshman, averaging 2.2 points per game and 8.3 minutes played. In his sophomore season, he appeared in all 30 of the Cougars games and averaged 6.3 points and 3.3 rebounds per game. He entered the starting lineup at the beginning of his junior year after losing over 25 pounds during the offseason. Franks finished the season 7th in the Pac-12 Conference with 17.4 points per game while also averaging 6.6 rebounds and 1.9 assists and was named honorable mention All-Pac-12 and the Pac-12 Most Improved Player of the Year. During the season he set a school record for most three-pointers made in a game with ten (on 13 attempts) against California on January 13, 2018, scoring a then-career high 34 points in total. Following the season Franks declared for the 2018 NBA draft, but did not hire an agent. He ultimately withdrew from the draft after deciding to return to Washington State for his senior season. As a senior Franks played in 27 games (26 starts) for Washington State, missing five games due to injury, and averaged a conference-best 21.6 points per game (24th highest in the nation) and finished with the ninth-highest rebounding average with 7.2 per game and was named first team All-Pac-12 and became the first WSU player to be named to the NABC All-District 20 team since Brock Motum in 2012.

== Professional career ==
=== Greensboro Swarm (2019–2020) ===
Franks worked out for several teams and participated in the NBA G League Elite Camp before the 2019 NBA draft, but was not selected. Franks signed a two-way contract with the Charlotte Hornets and their NBA G League affiliate, the Greensboro Swarm on July 3, 2019. On January 15, 2020, the Charlotte Hornets announced that they had waived Franks, without his appearing in a game for the parent team. He averaged 18.5 points, 5.6 rebounds and 1.6 assists per game for the Swarm.

=== Stockton Kings (2020) ===
On February 4, 2020, Franks was traded to the Stockton Kings in exchange for the returning player rights to Daniel Ochefu and the Kings' first-round pick in the 2020 G League draft. On February 19, Franks recorded 29 points and 10 rebounds in a loss to the Agua Caliente Clippers.

=== Lakeland / Orlando Magic (2021) ===
On November 27, 2020, Franks signed with the Orlando Magic. He was waived at the conclusion of training camp, but added to the roster of their G League affiliate, the Lakeland Magic. He played in 14 games and averaged 12.1 points, 6.6 rebounds and 1.5 assists in 24.5 minutes, while shooting .508 from the floor and .356 from three-point range and in three playoff matches, he averaged 16 points, 8 rebounds and 1 assist in 29.7 minutes, while shooting .581 from the field and .563 from behind the arc en route to the G League title.

On April 12, 2021, Franks signed a 10-day contract with Orlando. On April 22, he signed a second 10-day contract, but was waived five days later.

=== Brisbane Bullets (2021–2022) ===
On August 28, 2021, Franks signed with the Brisbane Bullets in Australia for the 2021–22 NBL season.

=== Adelaide 36ers (2022–2023) ===
On June 10, 2022, Franks signed a two-year deal with the Adelaide 36ers. He parted ways with the 36ers after one season.

=== Hapoel Gilboa Galil (2023) ===
On February 14, 2023, Franks signed with Hapoel Gilboa Galil of the Israeli Basketball Premier League.

=== Nagoya Diamond Dolphins (2023–2024) ===
On July 18, 2023, Franks signed with the Nagoya Diamond Dolphins of the Japanese B.League.

=== Ibaraki Robots (2024–2026) ===
On June 28, 2024, Franks signed with the Ibaraki Robots of the Japanese B.League.

=== Nanjing Monkey Kings (2026) ===
On September 7, 2026, Franks signed with the Nanjing Monkey Kings of the Chinese Basketball Association (CBA). However, on October 22, 2026, Franks and the Monkey Kings agreed to part ways.

=== Partizan (2026–present) ===
On October 23, 2026, Franks signed a one-year contract with Partizan of the Serbian SuperLeague, the ABA League, and the EuroLeague.

== Career statistics ==
Legend
GP	Games played	GS	Games started	MPG	Minutes per game
FG%	Field goal percentage	3P%	3-point field goal percentage	FT%	Free throw percentage
RPG	Rebounds per game	APG	Assists per game	SPG	Steals per game
BPG	Blocks per game	PPG	Points per game	**Bold**	Career high

=== Regular season ===
Year	Team	GP	GS	MPG	FG%	3P%	FT%	RPG	APG	SPG	BPG	PPG
2020–21	Orlando	7	0	14.4	.464	.333	.923	2.0	.7	.4	.4	6.1
Career		7	0	14.4	.464	.333	.923	2.0	.7	.4	.4	6.1

=== College ===
Year	Team	GP	GS	MPG	FG%	3P%	FT%	RPG	APG	SPG	BPG	PPG
2015–16	Washington State	23	0	8.3	.280	.222	.762	1.3	.4	0.0	.2	2.3
2016–17	Washington State	30	0	16.6	.442	.311	.732	3.3	.8	.1	.6	6.4
2017–18	Washington State	**30**	**30**	33.0	.476	**.405**	**.854**	6.6	1.9	.5	**1.0**	17.4
2018–19	Washington State	27	26	**34.4**	**.493**	.399	.848	**7.2**	**2.6**	**.7**	.7	**21.6**
Career		110	56	23.7	.467	.378	.829	4.7	1.5	.3	.6	12.2
