= Tom Digbeu =

French basketball player (born 2001)

No. 8 – Metropolitans 92
- Position: Small forward
- League: Élite 2

Personal information
- Born: 24 September 2001 (age 25) Barcelona, Spain
- Listed height: 1.99 m (6 ft 6 in)
- Listed weight: 80 kg (176 lb)

Career information
- Playing career: 2016–present

Career history
- 2016–2019: Barcelona B
- 2020–2021: Žalgiris Kaunas
- 2020–2021: → CBet Prienai
- 2021–2022: Brisbane Bullets
- 2022–2023: Alliance Sport Alsace
- 2023–2024: Gran Canaria
- 2023–2024: → Hestia Menorca
- 2025–2026: Stade Rochelais
- 2026–present: Metropolitans 92

Tom Digbeu (born 24 September 2001) is a Spanish-French professional basketball player for Metropolitans 92 of the French Élite 2. He usually plays as a small forward.

== Professional career ==
Digbeu played for Barcelona B between 2016 and 2019.

In the 2020–21 season, Digbeu split his time between Zalgiris Kaunas and Prienu Vytautas.

Digbeu joined the Brisbane Bullets in Australia for the 2021–22 NBL season.

== Personal life ==
He is son of French former professional basketball player Alain Digbeu. He also has Spanish citizenship.

== International ==
Born in Spain, Digbeu is eligible to play for both the Spanish and French national teams.
