= 2024 NBL Finals =

Australasian basketball tournament

Team	Coach	Wins
Melbourne United	Dean Vickerman	2
Tasmania JackJumpers	Scott Roth	3
- Countries: Australia; New Zealand
- Dates: 28 February – 31 March
- Season: 2023–24
- Teams: 6
- Defending champions: Sydney Kings
- MVP: Jack McVeigh (Tasmania)
- Semifinalists: Perth Wildcats; Illawarra Hawks
- Matches played: 14
- Attendance: 98,469 (7,034 per match)
- Scoring leader: Jack McVeigh 17.8
- All statistics correct as of 31 March 2024.

The 2024 NBL Finals was the postseason tournament of the National Basketball League's 2023–24 season.

As Australia and New Zealand participated in 2025 FIBA Asia Cup qualification, the league took a break during the FIBA international window of 18–28 February 2024.

== Format ==
The finals was played in February and March 2024 between the top six teams of the regular season, consisting of three play-in games, two best-of-three semifinal series and the best-of-five Grand Final series, where the highest seed hosted the first, third and fifth games.

The top two seeds in the regular season automatically qualified to the semifinals. Teams ranked three to six competed in the play-in tournament. The third seed played the fourth seed for third spot and the loser played the winner of fifth or sixth for the fourth seed.

== Qualification ==
=== Qualified teams ===
Team	Date of qualification	Round of qualification	Finals appearance	Previous appearance	Previous best performance	Ref.
Melbourne United	26 January 2024	17	28th	2022	Champions (1993, 1997, 2006, 2008, 2018, 2021)	
Perth Wildcats	27 January 2024	17	37th	2023	Champions (1990, 1991, 1995, 2000, 2010, 2014, 2016, 2017, 2019, 2020)	
Tasmania JackJumpers	10 February 2024	19	3rd	2023	Runners-up (2022)	
Illawarra Hawks	15 February 2024	20	23rd	2022	Champions (2001)	
Sydney Kings	17 February 2024	20	18th	2023	Champions (2003, 2004, 2005, 2022, 2023)	
New Zealand Breakers	18 February 2024	20	10th	2023	Champions (2011, 2012, 2013, 2015)	

=== Ladder ===
Pos	2023–24 NBL season											
Pos	Team	Pld	W	L	PCT	Last 5	Streak	Home	Away	PF	PA	PP
1	Melbourne United	28	20	8	71.43%	3–2	W1	11–3	9–5	2615	2454	106.56%
2	Perth Wildcats	28	17	11	60.71%	2–3	L2	10–4	7–7	2630	2563	102.61%
3	Tasmania JackJumpers	28	16	12	57.14%	4–1	W4	8–6	8–6	2564	2378	107.82%
4	Illawarra Hawks	28	14	14	50.00%	3–2	L1	8–6	6–8	2547	2518	101.15%
5	Sydney Kings	28	13	15	46.43%	2–3	W1	7–7	6–8	2672	2602	102.69%
6	New Zealand Breakers	28	13	15	46.43%	3–2	L1	8–6	5–9	2498	2480	100.73%
7	Brisbane Bullets	28	13	15	46.43%	2–3	L1	8–6	5–9	2458	2534	97.00%
8	Cairns Taipans	28	12	16	42.86%	1–4	W1	7–7	5–9	2506	2589	96.79%
9	Adelaide 36ers	28	12	16	42.86%	3–2	W1	9–5	3–11	2457	2563	95.86%
10	S.E. Melbourne Phoenix	28	10	18	35.71%	1–4	L4	7–7	3–11	2425	2691	90.12%

Updated to match(es) played on 18 February 2024. Source: NBL.com.au

=== Ladder progression ===
Leader and qualification to semifinals
Qualification to semifinals
Qualification to play-in games
Last place

2023–24 NBL season
Team ╲ Round	1	2	3	4	5	6	7	8	9	10	11	12	13	14	15	16	17	18	19	20
Adelaide 36ers	9	10	10	9	7	8	8	8	9	10	10	10	10	10	10	9	9	9	9	9
Brisbane Bullets	1	2	6	7	6	5	7	6	6	6	7	9	9	6	5	4	5	6	5	7
Cairns Taipans	8	6	3	4	3	7	6	7	7	7	6	6	7	9	7	6	7	8	8	8
Illawarra Hawks	10	8	9	10	9	10	10	10	10	8	8	8	8	5	6	8	6	4	4	4
Melbourne United	3	1	1	1	1	1	1	1	1	1	1	1	1	1	1	1	1	1	1	1
New Zealand Breakers	4	7	5	6	10	9	9	9	8	9	9	7	6	8	9	7	8	7	6	6
Perth Wildcats	6	5	8	8	8	6	5	4	3	5	3	2	2	2	2	2	2	2	2	2
S.E. Melbourne Phoenix	5	9	7	5	2	3	4	5	5	3	5	5	5	7	8	10	10	10	10	10
Sydney Kings	2	3	2	3	4	2	2	2	4	4	2	4	3	4	4	5	4	5	7	5
Tasmania JackJumpers	7	4	4	2	5	4	3	3	2	2	4	3	4	3	3	3	3	3	3	3

Updated to match(es) played on 18 February 2024. Source: NBL.com.au

=== Seedings ===
1. Melbourne United
2. Perth Wildcats
3. Tasmania JackJumpers
4. Illawarra Hawks
5. Sydney Kings
6. New Zealand Breakers

The NBL tie-breaker system as outlined in the NBL Rules and Regulations states that in the case of an identical win–loss record, the overall points percentage will determine order of seeding.

=== Playoff Bracket ===
Play-in / Seeding qualifier
5	Sydney Kings	76
6	New Zealand Breakers	83
3	Tasmania JackJumpers	92
4	Illawarra Hawks	76

Play-in game
4	Illawarra Hawks	88
6	New Zealand Breakers	85

Semifinals
1	Melbourne United	115	108	100
4	Illawarra Hawks	106	113	94
2	Perth Wildcats	89	94	84
3	Tasmania JackJumpers	81	102	100

Championship
1	Melbourne United	104	77	91	88	81
3	Tasmania JackJumpers	81	82	93	86	83

== Play-in tournament ==
=== (3) Tasmania JackJumpers vs. (4) Illawarra Hawks ===
ESPN

28 February 2024
17:30

boxscore
report

Tasmania JackJumpers	92–76	Illawarra Hawks
Scoring by quarter: 29–17, 22–27, 19–19, 22–13
Pts: McVeigh 26; Rebs: McVeigh 11; Asts: Doyle 10		Pts: Clark 21; Rebs: Clark 10; Asts: Robinson 3

Derwent Entertainment Centre, Hobart
Attendance: 4,340
Referees: Vaughan Mayberry, Kenny Widgeon, Mitch Hare

Regular season series
Tasmania won 2–1 in the regular season series

12 October 2023

boxscore

Tasmania JackJumpers 103, Illawarra Hawks 73

Derwent Entertainment Centre, Hobart

23 December 2023

boxscore

Illawarra Hawks 89, Tasmania JackJumpers 100

Wollongong Entertainment Centre, Wollongong

12 January 2024

boxscore

Tasmania JackJumpers 107, Illawarra Hawks 108 (2OT)

Derwent Entertainment Centre, Hobart

=== (5) Sydney Kings vs. (6) New Zealand Breakers ===
ESPN

28 February 2024
19:30

boxscore
report

Sydney Kings	76–83	New Zealand Breakers
Scoring by quarter: 22–15, 25–23, 13–22, 16–23
Pts: Adams 18; Rebs: Valentine 8 Asts: Adams 5		Pts: Jackson-Cartwright 34; Rebs: Mathiang 10; Asts: Jackson-Cartwright 6

Sydney SuperDome, Sydney
Attendance: 8,231
Referees: Michael Aylen, Chris Reid, Nico Fernandes

Regular season series
Sydney won 2–1 in the regular season series

5 November 2023

boxscore

Sydney Kings 87, New Zealand Breakers 85

Sydney SuperDome, Sydney

22 December 2023

boxscore

New Zealand Breakers 109, Sydney Kings 101

Spark Arena, Auckland

14 January 2024

boxscore

Sydney Kings 105, New Zealand Breakers 76

Sydney SuperDome, Sydney

=== (4) Illawarra Hawks vs. (6) New Zealand Breakers ===
ESPN

4 March 2024
19:30

boxscore
report

Illawarra Hawks	88–85	New Zealand Breakers
Scoring by quarter: 31–17, 11–25, 24–21, 22–22
Pts: Robinson 26; Rebs: Froling 9 Asts: Robinson 3		Pts: Jackson-Cartwright 19; Rebs: Cheatham 9 Asts: Jackson-Cartwright 9

Wollongong Entertainment Centre, Wollongong
Attendance: 5,178
Referees: Vaughan Mayberry, Chris Reid, James Griguol

Regular season series
Illawarra won 2–1 in the regular season series

19 November 2023

boxscore

New Zealand Breakers 65, Illawarra Hawks 69

Spark Arena, Auckland

28 January 2024

boxscore

Illawarra Hawks 89, New Zealand Breakers 85

Wollongong Entertainment Centre, Wollongong

9 February 2024

boxscore

New Zealand Breakers 88, Illawarra Hawks 85

Spark Arena, Auckland

== Semifinals series ==
=== (1) Melbourne United vs. (4) Illawarra Hawks ===
ESPN

7 March 2024
19:30

boxscore
report

Melbourne United	115–106 (OT)	Illawarra Hawks
Scoring by quarter: 25–29, 31–28, 18–27, 26–16, Overtime: 15–6
Pts: Dellavedova 30; Rebs: Lual-Acuil 9 Asts: Dellavedova 10		Pts: Froling 26; Rebs: Clark 12; Asts: Robinson 7
Melbourne leads series, 1–0

John Cain Arena, Melbourne
Attendance: 8,232
Referees: Michael Aylen, Mitch Hare, Ruben Woolcock

10 Peach

10 March 2024
15:00

boxscore
report

Illawarra Hawks	113–108 (OT)	Melbourne United
Scoring by quarter: 19–25, 31–24, 23–26, 24–22, Overtime: 16–11
Pts: Clark 31; Rebs: Clark 16; Asts: Froling 4		Pts: Dellavedova 20; Rebs: Lual-Acuil, Travers 7 Asts: Dellavedova 8
Series tied, 1–1

Wollongong Entertainment Centre, Wollongong
Attendance: 5,631
Referees: Michael Aylen, Mitch Hare, Ruben Woolcock

ESPN

13 March 2024
19:30

boxscore
report

Melbourne United	100–94	Illawarra Hawks
Scoring by quarter: 30–24, 24–23, 22–18, 24–29
Pts: Ili 22; Rebs: Travers 11; Asts: Dellavedova 5		Pts: Froling 23; Rebs: Clark, Hickey 6 Asts: Robinson 7
Melbourne wins series, 2–1

John Cain Arena, Melbourne
Attendance: 6,288
Referees: Michael Aylen, Mitch Hare, Ruben Woolcock

Regular season series
Melbourne won 3–0 in the regular season series

20 October 2023

boxscore

Illawarra Hawks 91, Melbourne United 101

Wollongong Entertainment Centre, Wollongong

29 October 2023

boxscore

Melbourne United 96, Illawarra Hawks 84

John Cain Arena, Melbourne

18 February 2024

boxscore

Melbourne United 92, Illawarra Hawks 87

John Cain Arena, Melbourne

=== (2) Perth Wildcats vs. (3) Tasmania JackJumpers ===
ESPN

8 March 2024
18:30

boxscore
report

Perth Wildcats	89–81	Tasmania JackJumpers
Scoring by quarter: 24–24, 22–19, 16–15, 27–23
Pts: Pinder 25; Rebs: Cotton, Pinder 7 Asts: Cotton 5		Pts: Crawford 19; Rebs: Magnay 8 Asts: Doyle 6
Perth leads series, 1–0

Perth Arena, Perth
Attendance: 10,624
Referees: Vaughan Mayberry, Chris Reid, Nico Fernandes

ESPN

11 March 2024
19:30

boxscore
report

Tasmania JackJumpers	102–94	Perth Wildcats
Scoring by quarter: 21–29, 26–23, 27–21, 28–21
Pts: Doyle 24; Rebs: Magnay 7 Asts: Macdonald 5		Pts: Cotton 26; Rebs: Doolittle 9 Asts: H.Harris, Usher 4
Series tied, 1–1

Derwent Entertainment Centre, Hobart
Attendance: 4,340
Referees: Vaughan Mayberry, Chris Reid, Nico Fernandes

ESPN

13 March 2024
18:30

boxscore
report

Perth Wildcats	84–100	Tasmania JackJumpers
Scoring by quarter: 19–21, 24–31, 21–25, 20–23
Pts: Cotton 21; Rebs: Pinder 7 Asts: H.Harris, T.Webster 3		Pts: McVeigh 27; Rebs: Magnay 9 Asts: Doyle 9
Tasmania wins series, 2–1

Perth Arena, Perth
Attendance: 7,467
Referees: Vaughan Mayberry, Chris Reid, James Griguol

Regular season series
Perth won 2–1 in the regular season series

29 September 2023

boxscore

Perth Wildcats 101, Tasmania JackJumpers 95

Perth Arena, Perth

15 December 2023

boxscore

Perth Wildcats 89, Tasmania JackJumpers 88

Perth Arena, Perth

17 February 2024

boxscore

Tasmania JackJumpers 86, Perth Wildcats 72

Derwent Entertainment Centre, Hobart

== Championship series ==
=== (1) Melbourne United vs. (3) Tasmania JackJumpers ===
10 Peach

17 March 2024
16:00

boxscore
report

Melbourne United	104–81	Tasmania JackJumpers
Scoring by quarter: 26–24, 25–17, 25–22, 28–18
Pts: Goulding 22; Rebs: Lual-Acuil 11; Asts: Dellavedova 6		Pts: Drmic 18; Rebs: Doyle 8 Asts: Macdonald, McVeigh 3
Melbourne leads series, 1–0

John Cain Arena, Melbourne
Attendance: 9,108
Referees: Vaughan Mayberry, Michael Aylen, Mitch Hare

10 Peach

22 March 2024
19:30

boxscore
report

Tasmania JackJumpers	82–77	Melbourne United
Scoring by quarter: 23–23, 17–21, 20–19, 22–14
Pts: McVeigh 16; Rebs: Doyle 10; Asts: Crawford, McVeigh 4		Pts: Ili 20; Rebs: Lual-Acuil 11; Asts: Dellavedova 7
Series tied, 1–1

Derwent Entertainment Centre, Hobart
Attendance: 4,340
Referees: Vaughan Mayberry, Michael Aylen, Mitch Hare

ESPN

24 March 2024
17:30

boxscore
report

Melbourne United	91–93	Tasmania JackJumpers
Scoring by quarter: 25–20, 19–23, 25–19, 22–31
Pts: Dellavedova 21; Rebs: Hukporti 9 Asts: Dellavedova 8		Pts: McVeigh 18; Rebs: McVeigh 12; Asts: Doyle 7
Tasmania leads series, 2–1

John Cain Arena, Melbourne
Attendance: 10,175
Referees: Vaughan Mayberry, Michael Aylen, Mitch Hare

ESPN

28 March 2024
19:30

boxscore
report

Tasmania JackJumpers	86–88	Melbourne United
Scoring by quarter: 20–17, 19–24, 27–26, 20–21
Pts: McVeigh 28; Rebs: Drmic 8 Asts: Doyle, Drmic 3		Pts: Clark 18; Rebs: Travers 11; Asts: Dellavedova 6
Series tied, 2–2

Derwent Entertainment Centre, Hobart
Attendance: 4,340
Referees: Michael Aylen, Vaughan Mayberry, Mitch Hare

ESPN

31 March 2024
16:00

boxscore
report

Melbourne United	81–83	Tasmania JackJumpers
Scoring by quarter: 31–26, 13–18, 19–15, 18–24
Pts: Lual-Acuil 14; Rebs: Hukporti 15; Asts: Dellavedova 7		Pts: Crawford 32; Rebs: Magnay 12; Asts: Doyle, Macdonald 2
Tasmania wins series, 3–2

John Cain Arena, Melbourne
Attendance: 10,175
Referees: Vaughan Mayberry, Michael Aylen, Mitch Hare

Regular season series
Tasmania won 2–1 in the regular season series

8 October 2023

boxscore

Melbourne United 75, Tasmania JackJumpers 80

John Cain Arena, Melbourne

27 October 2023

boxscore

Tasmania JackJumpers 82, Melbourne United 90

Derwent Entertainment Centre, Hobart

19 January 2024

boxscore

Tasmania JackJumpers 107, Melbourne United 86

Derwent Entertainment Centre, Hobart

== Media coverage ==
=== Television ===
Australian broadcast rights to the season are held by ESPN. All games are available live on ESPN and the streaming platform Kayo Freebies. Network 10 will broadcast Sunday afternoon games on 10 Peach and 10 Play.

== See also ==
- 2023–24 NBL season
- 2023–24 NBL regular season
