= 2023 NBL Finals =

Australasian basketball tournament

Team	Coach	Wins
Sydney Kings	Chase Buford	3
New Zealand Breakers	Mody Maor	2
- Countries: Australia; New Zealand
- Dates: 9 February – 15 March
- Season: 2022–23
- Teams: 6
- Defending champions: Sydney Kings
- MVP: Derrick Walton (Sydney)
- Semifinalists: Cairns Taipans; Tasmania JackJumpers
- Matches played: 14
- Attendance: 114,653 (8,190 per match)
- Scoring leader: Barry Brown Jr. 18.4
- All statistics correct as of 15 March 2023.

The 2023 NBL Finals was the postseason tournament of the National Basketball League's 2022–23 season.

== Format ==
The finals will be played in February and March 2023 between the top six teams of the regular season, consisting of three play-in games, two best-of-three semifinal series and the best-of-five Grand Final series, where the higher seed hosts the first, third and fifth games.

The top two seeds in the regular season will automatically qualify to the semifinals. Teams ranked three to six will compete in the play-in tournament. The third seed will play the fourth seed for third spot and the loser will play the winner of fifth or sixth for the fourth seed. This will be the first season the league will introduce play-in games.

== Qualification ==
=== Qualified teams ===
Team	Date of qualification	Round of qualification	Finals appearance	Previous appearance	Previous best performance	Ref.
Sydney Kings	16 January 2023	15	17th	2022	Champions (2003, 2004, 2005, 2022)	
New Zealand Breakers	28 January 2023	17	9th	2018	Champions (2011, 2012, 2013, 2015)	
Cairns Taipans	28 January 2023	17	9th	2020	Runners-up (2011, 2015)	
Tasmania JackJumpers	4 February 2023	18	2nd	2022	Runners-up (2022)	
S.E. Melbourne Phoenix	5 February 2023	18	2nd	2021	Semifinalist (2021)	
Perth Wildcats	5 February 2023	18	36th	2021	Champions (1990, 1991, 1995, 2000, 2010, 2014, 2016, 2017, 2019, 2020)	

=== Ladder ===
Pos	2022–23 NBL season											
Pos	Team	Pld	W	L	PCT	Last 5	Streak	Home	Away	PF	PA	PP
1	Sydney Kings	28	19	9	67.86%	2–3	L2	10–4	9–5	2679	2468	108.55%
2	New Zealand Breakers	28	18	10	64.29%	5–0	W5	7–7	11–3	2423	2246	107.88%
3	Cairns Taipans	28	18	10	64.29%	2–3	W1	8–6	10–4	2455	2376	103.32%
4	Tasmania JackJumpers	28	16	12	57.14%	3–2	W2	7–7	9–5	2385	2305	103.47%
5	S.E. Melbourne Phoenix	28	15	13	53.57%	3–2	L1	11–3	4–10	2553	2512	101.63%
6	Perth Wildcats	28	15	13	53.57%	2–3	W1	9–5	6–8	2580	2568	100.47%
7	Melbourne United	28	15	13	53.57%	4–1	W1	8–6	7–7	2434	2424	100.41%
8	Adelaide 36ers	28	13	15	46.43%	2–3	L1	8–6	5–9	2546	2597	98.04%
9	Brisbane Bullets	28	8	20	28.57%	2–3	L3	4–10	4–10	2365	2600	90.96%
10	Illawarra Hawks	28	3	25	10.71%	1–4	L4	2–12	1–13	2261	2585	87.47%

Updated to match(es) played on 5 February 2023. Source: NBL.com.au

=== Ladder progression ===
Leader and qualification to semifinals
Qualification to semifinals
Qualification to play-in games
Last place

2022–23 NBL season
Team ╲ Round	1	2	3	4	5	6	7	8	9	10	11	12	13	14	15	16	17	18
Adelaide 36ers	—	—	7	4	8	8	7	6	6	7	7	7	7	5	8	8	8	8
Brisbane Bullets	9	9	10	9	9	9	9	9	8	9	9	9	9	9	9	9	9	9
Cairns Taipans	1	3	4	3	4	3	3	3	3	4	3	4	3	3	2	2	2	3
Illawarra Hawks	7	6	9	10	10	10	10	10	10	10	10	10	10	10	10	10	10	10
Melbourne United	5	5	6	8	6	6	8	8	9	8	8	8	8	8	6	7	7	7
New Zealand Breakers	6	4	3	2	1	2	2	1	2	2	1	2	2	2	3	3	3	2
Perth Wildcats	2	1	2	5	7	7	5	7	7	6	5	6	5	7	5	5	5	6
S.E. Melbourne Phoenix	4	7	8	7	3	4	4	4	4	3	4	3	4	6	7	6	6	5
Sydney Kings	3	2	1	1	2	1	1	2	1	1	2	1	1	1	1	1	1	1
Tasmania JackJumpers	8	8	5	6	5	5	6	5	5	5	6	5	6	4	4	4	4	4

Updated to match(es) played on 5 February 2023. Source: NBL.com.au

=== Seedings ===
1. Sydney Kings
2. New Zealand Breakers
3. Cairns Taipans
4. Tasmania JackJumpers
5. S.E. Melbourne Phoenix
6. Perth Wildcats

The NBL tie-breaker system as outlined in the NBL Rules and Regulations states that in the case of an identical win–loss record, the overall points percentage will determine order of seeding.

==== Playoff Bracket ====
Play-in / Seeding qualifier
5	S.E. Melbourne Phoenix	99
6	Perth Wildcats	106
3	Cairns Taipans	79
4	Tasmania JackJumpers	87

Play-in game
3	Cairns Taipans	91
6	Perth Wildcats	78

Semifinals
1	Sydney Kings	95	82	79
3	Cairns Taipans	87	93	64
2	New Zealand Breakers	88	78	92
4	Tasmania JackJumpers	68	89	77

Championship
1	Sydney Kings	87	81	91	70	77
2	New Zealand Breakers	95	74	68	80	69

== Play-in tournament ==
=== (5) S.E. Melbourne Phoenix vs. (6) Perth Wildcats ===
9 February 2023	S.E. Melbourne Phoenix	99–106	Perth Wildcats	John Cain Arena, Melbourne
18:30	Scoring by quarter: 22–18, 29–29, 25–18, 23–41
ESPN	Pts: Creek 24; Rebs: Williams 17; Asts: Browne 5	boxscore report	Pts: Cotton 26; Rebs: Travers 9 Asts: Thomas 8	Attendance: 5,176; Referees: Michael Aylen, Chris Reid, Ruben Woolcock

Regular season series
S.E. Melbourne won 2–1 in the regular season series

28 October 2022

boxscore

Perth Wildcats 90, S.E. Melbourne Phoenix 91

RAC Arena, Perth

17 November 2022

boxscore

Perth Wildcats 103, S.E. Melbourne Phoenix 96

RAC Arena, Perth

22 January 2023

boxscore

S.E. Melbourne Phoenix 112, Perth Wildcats 91

State Basketball Centre, Melbourne

=== (3) Cairns Taipans vs. (4) Tasmania JackJumpers ===
9 February 2023	Cairns Taipans	79–87	Tasmania JackJumpers	Cairns Convention Centre, Cairns
19:30	Scoring by quarter: 16–25, 21–21, 18–19, 24–22
ESPN	Pts: McCall 24; Rebs: Hogg 8 Asts: Hogg 4	boxscore report	Pts: Doyle 25; Rebs: Kelly 12; Asts: Doyle, Kelly 4	Attendance: 3,670; Referees: Vaughan Mayberry, Nico Fernandez, Mitch Hare

Regular season series
Cairns won 2–1 in the regular season series

3 October 2022

boxscore

Tasmania JackJumpers 84, Cairns Taipans 106

MyState Bank Arena, Hobart

17 December 2022

boxscore

Tasmania JackJumpers 82, Cairns Taipans 91

MyState Bank Arena, Hobart

20 January 2023

boxscore

Cairns Taipans 77, Tasmania JackJumpers 85

Cairns Convention Centre, Cairns

=== (3) Cairns Taipans vs. (6) Perth Wildcats ===
12 February 2023	Cairns Taipans	91–78	Perth Wildcats	Cairns Convention Centre, Cairns
13:00	Scoring by quarter: 25–19, 27–24, 19–16, 20–19
10 Peach	Pts: Hogg 32; Rebs: Waardenburg 10; Asts: Scott 8	boxscore report	Pts: Cotton 19; Rebs: Manek 10; Asts: Cotton 10	Attendance: 3,020; Referees: Vaughan Mayberry, Chris Reid, Nico Fernandez

Regular season series
Perth won 2–1 in the regular season series

10 October 2022

boxscore

Cairns Taipans 76, Perth Wildcats 105

Cairns Convention Centre, Cairns

20 December 2022

boxscore

Cairns Taipans 83, Perth Wildcats 105

Cairns Convention Centre, Cairns

3 February 2023

boxscore

Perth Wildcats 71, Cairns Taipans 84

RAC Arena, Perth

== Semifinals series ==
=== (2) New Zealand Breakers vs. (4) Tasmania JackJumpers ===
12 February 2023	New Zealand Breakers	88–68 (Series: New Zealand leads series, 1–0)	Tasmania JackJumpers	Spark Arena, Auckland
18:00	Scoring by quarter: 19–12, 20–25, 26–17, 23–14
10 Peach	Pts: Pardon 15; Rebs: Pardon 9 Asts: McDowell-White 7	boxscore report	Pts: Kelly 12; Rebs: Kenyon 6 Asts: Doyle 4	Attendance: 5,479; Referees: Michael Aylen, Mitch Hare, James Griguol

16 February 2023	Tasmania JackJumpers	89–78 (Series: Series tied, 1–1)	New Zealand Breakers	MyState Bank Arena, Hobart
19:30	Scoring by quarter: 18–14, 24–28, 22–18, 25–18
ESPN	Pts: Doyle 23; Rebs: Kenyon, Magnay 6 Asts: Doyle 5	boxscore report	Pts: Brown 19; Rebs: Pardon 11; Asts: McDowell-White 4	Attendance: 4,293; Referees: Michael Aylen, Mitch Hare, Ruben Woolcock

19 February 2023	New Zealand Breakers	92–77 (Series: New Zealand wins series, 2–1)	Tasmania JackJumpers	Spark Arena, Auckland
18:00	Scoring by quarter: 21–25, 28–17, 18–22, 25–13
10 Peach	Pts: Brown 32; Rebs: Pardon 14; Asts: McDowell-White 4	boxscore report	Pts: McVeigh 22; Rebs: McVeigh 7 Asts: Doyle, Krslovic 3	Attendance: 6,410; Referees: Michael Aylen, Mitch Hare, Ruben Woolcock

Regular season series
New Zealand won 3–1 in the regular season series

7 October 2022

boxscore

New Zealand Breakers 71, Tasmania JackJumpers 65

Spark Arena, Auckland

30 October 2022

boxscore

New Zealand Breakers 94, Tasmania JackJumpers 62

Spark Arena, Auckland

18 November 2022

boxscore

Tasmania JackJumpers 76, New Zealand Breakers 84

Silverdome, Launceston

26 December 2022

boxscore

Tasmania JackJumpers 93, New Zealand Breakers 82

MyState Bank Arena, Hobart

=== (1) Sydney Kings vs. (3) Cairns Taipans ===
15 February 2023	Sydney Kings	95–87 (Series: Sydney leads series, 1–0)	Cairns Taipans	Qudos Bank Arena, Sydney
19:30	Scoring by quarter: 25–26, 25–33, 27–10, 18–18
ESPN	Pts: Cooks 27; Rebs: Cooks 14; Asts: Walton 5	boxscore report	Pts: Hogg 24; Rebs: Waardenburg 7 Asts: Scott 7	Attendance: 7,367; Referees: Vaughan Mayberry, Chris Reid, Nico Fernandez

17 February 2023	Cairns Taipans	93–82 (Series: Series tied, 1–1)	Sydney Kings	Cairns Convention Centre, Cairns
18:30	Scoring by quarter: 27–19, 27–22, 17–14, 22–27
ESPN	Pts: Hogg 25; Rebs: Waardenburg 10; Asts: McCall 7	boxscore report	Pts: Walton 22; Rebs: Simon 10; Asts: Walton 6	Attendance: 4,626; Referees: Vaughan Mayberry, Chris Reid, Nico Fernandez

19 February 2023	Sydney Kings	79–64 (Series: Sydney wins series, 2–1)	Cairns Taipans	Qudos Bank Arena, Sydney
14:00	Scoring by quarter: 20–26, 28–13, 14–19, 17–6
ESPN	Pts: Vasiljevic 15; Rebs: Cooks, Noi 11; Asts: Walton 9	boxscore report	Pts: Ayre 20; Rebs: Waardenburg 12; Asts: Ayre 4	Attendance: 7,123; Referees: Vaughan Mayberry, Chris Reid, James Griguol

Regular season series
Cairns won 2–1 in the regular season series

14 October 2022

boxscore

Sydney Kings 78, Cairns Taipans 83

Qudos Bank Arena, Sydney

29 October 2022

boxscore

Sydney Kings 106, Cairns Taipans 103

Qudos Bank Arena, Sydney

28 November 2022

boxscore

Cairns Taipans 94, Sydney Kings 88 (OT)

Cairns Convention Centre, Cairns

== Championship series ==
=== (1) Sydney Kings vs. (2) New Zealand Breakers ===
3 March 2023	Sydney Kings	87–95 (Series: New Zealand leads series, 1–0)	New Zealand Breakers	Qudos Bank Arena, Sydney
19:30	Scoring by quarter: 23–30, 20–24, 27–22, 17–19
10 Peach	Pts: Simon 18; Rebs: Simon 6 Asts: Walton 6	boxscore report	Pts: Brown, McDowell-White 19; Rebs: McDowell-White 9 Asts: McDowell-White 9	Attendance: 13,145; Referees: Vaughan Mayberry, Michael Aylen, Mitch Hare

5 March 2023	New Zealand Breakers	74–81 (Series: Series tied, 1–1)	Sydney Kings	Spark Arena, Auckland
18:00	Scoring by quarter: 9–21, 21–13, 11–23, 33–24
10 Peach	Pts: Brown 21; Rebs: Pardon 11; Asts: McDowell-White 4	boxscore report	Pts: Noi 20; Rebs: Hunter 10; Asts: Bruce 3	Attendance: 8,429; Referees: Vaughan Mayberry, Michael Aylen, Mitch Hare

10 March 2023	Sydney Kings	91–68 (Series: Sydney leads series, 2–1)	New Zealand Breakers	Qudos Bank Arena, Sydney
19:30	Scoring by quarter: 22–24, 21–23, 24–12, 24–9
ESPN	Pts: Vasiljevic 15; Rebs: Cooks 8 Asts: Walton 9	boxscore report	Pts: McDowell-White 11; Rebs: Le'afa, McDowell-White 6 Asts: Brown, Le'afa 3	Attendance: 18,049; Referees: Michael Aylen, Vaughan Mayberry, Mitch Hare

12 March 2023	New Zealand Breakers	80–70 (Series: Series tied, 2–2)	Sydney Kings	Spark Arena, Auckland
18:00	Scoring by quarter: 18–12, 21–15, 15–25, 26–18
Sky Sports	Pts: Brantley 23; Rebs: Loe, McDowell-White, Pardon 6 Asts: McDowell-White 5	boxscore report	Pts: Walton 18; Rebs: Simon 7 Asts: Walton 4	Attendance: 9,742; Referees: Michael Aylen, Vaughan Mayberry, Mitch Hare

15 March 2023	Sydney Kings	77–69 (Series: Sydney wins series, 3–2)	New Zealand Breakers	Qudos Bank Arena, Sydney
19:30	Scoring by quarter: 11–22, 24–14, 21–20, 21–13
ESPN	Pts: Walton 21; Rebs: Cooks 11; Asts: Walton 6	boxscore report	Pts: Brown 22; Rebs: Pardon 9 Asts: McDowell-White 5	Attendance: 18,124; Referees: Vaughan Mayberry, Michael Aylen, Mitch Hare

Regular season series
Sydney won 2–1 in the regular season series

6 November 2022

boxscore

New Zealand Breakers 77, Sydney Kings 81

Spark Arena, Auckland

8 December 2022

boxscore

New Zealand Breakers 81, Sydney Kings 88

Spark Arena, Auckland

22 January 2023

boxscore

Sydney Kings 88, New Zealand Breakers 93

Qudos Bank Arena, Sydney

== Media coverage ==
=== Television ===
Australian broadcast rights to the season are held by ESPN. All games are available live on ESPN and the streaming platform Kayo Freebies. Network 10 will broadcast Sunday afternoon games on 10 Peach and 10 Play.

== See also ==
- 2022–23 NBL season
- 2022–23 NBL regular season
