= 2022 NBL Finals =

Team	Coach	Wins
Sydney Kings	Chase Buford	3
Tasmania JackJumpers	Scott Roth	0
- Country: Australia
- Dates: 28 April – 11 May
- Season: 2021–22
- Teams: 4
- Defending champions: Melbourne United
- MVP: Xavier Cooks (Sydney)
- Semifinalists: Melbourne United; Illawarra Hawks
- Matches played: 8
- Attendance: 64,046 (8,006 per match)
- Scoring leader: Jaylen Adams 25.7

The 2022 NBL Finals was the championship series of the 2021–22 NBL season and the conclusion of the season.

== Format ==
The finals was played in April and May 2022 between the top four teams of the regular season, consisting of two best-of-three semi-final and one best-of-five final series, where the higher seed hosts the first, third and fifth games.

== Qualification ==
The 2022 NBL Finals marked the first time in 35 years that the Perth Wildcats have not qualified for the finals, having last failed to do so in 1986.

=== Qualified teams ===
Team	Date of qualification	Round of qualification	Finals appearance	Previous appearance	Previous best performance	Ref.
Melbourne United	10 April 2022	19	27th	2021	Champions (1993, 1997, 2006, 2008, 2018, 2021)	
Sydney Kings	14 April 2022	20	16th	2020	Champions (2003, 2004, 2005)	
Illawarra Hawks	22 April 2022	21	22nd	2021	Champions (2001)	
Tasmania JackJumpers	24 April 2022	21	1st	N/A		

=== Ladder ===
Pos	2021–22 NBL season											
Pos	Team	Pld	W	L	PCT	Last 5	Streak	Home	Away	PF	PA	PP
1	Melbourne United	28	20	8	71.43%	4–1	L1	9–5	11–3	2455	2244	109.40%
2	Illawarra Hawks	28	19	9	67.86%	4–1	W2	8–6	11–3	2498	2345	106.52%
3	Sydney Kings	28	19	9	67.86%	3–2	L1	9–5	10–4	2397	2313	103.63%
4	Tasmania JackJumpers	28	17	11	60.71%	4–1	W4	8–6	9–5	2230	2220	100.45%
5	Perth Wildcats	28	16	12	57.14%	2–3	L2	7–7	9–5	2495	2377	104.96%
6	S.E. Melbourne Phoenix	28	15	13	53.57%	3–2	W2	7–7	8–6	2456	2424	101.32%
7	Adelaide 36ers	28	10	18	35.71%	3–2	W1	6–8	4–10	2283	2346	97.31%
8	Brisbane Bullets	28	10	18	35.71%	2–3	L2	6–8	4–10	2379	2500	95.16%
9	Cairns Taipans	28	9	19	32.14%	1–4	W1	5–9	4–10	2228	2408	92.52%
10	New Zealand Breakers	28	5	23	17.86%	0–5	L10	2–12	3–11	2234	2478	90.15%

Updated to match(es) played on 24 April 2022. Source: NBL.com.au

=== Ladder progression ===
- Numbers highlighted in green indicate that the team finished the round inside the top four.
- Numbers highlighted in blue indicates the team finished first on the ladder in that round.
- Numbers highlighted in red indicates the team finished last place on the ladder in that round.

2021–22 NBL season
Team	1	2	3	4	5	6	7	8	9	10	11	12	13	14	15	16	17	18	19	20	21
Adelaide 36ers	8	6	8	8	8	8	7	8	8	8	8	7	8	8	8	8	8	9	9	8	7
Brisbane Bullets	7	5	7	6	6	7	6	5	7	9	7	8	7	7	7	7	7	7	7	7	8
Cairns Taipans	9	7	4	4	5	5	5	6	9	7	9	10	9	9	10	9	9	8	8	9	9
Illawarra Hawks	3	2	3	3	3	3	3	4	4	5	4	5	4	4	5	4	4	3	3	3	2
Melbourne United	6	9	6	5	4	4	1	1	2	3	1	1	1	1	1	1	1	1	1	1	1
New Zealand Breakers	10	10	10	10	10	10	10	10	10	10	10	9	10	10	9	10	10	10	10	10	10
Perth Wildcats	2	3	1	1	1	1	2	2	3	1	2	3	3	3	2	2	3	4	4	4	5
S.E. Melbourne Phoenix	1	1	2	2	2	2	4	3	1	2	3	2	2	2	4	5	5	6	6	6	6
Sydney Kings	5	4	5	7	7	6	8	7	5	6	5	4	5	5	3	3	2	2	2	2	3
Tasmania JackJumpers	4	8	9	9	9	9	9	9	6	4	6	6	6	6	6	6	6	5	5	5	4

=== Seedings ===
1. Melbourne United
2. Illawarra Hawks
3. Sydney Kings
4. Tasmania JackJumpers

The NBL tie-breaker system as outlined in the NBL Rules and Regulations states that in the case of an identical win–loss record, the overall points percentage will determine order of seeding.

==== Playoff Bracket ====
Semifinals
1	Melbourne United	74	72	73
4	Tasmania JackJumpers	63	79	76
2	Illawarra Hawks	79	87	X
3	Sydney Kings	89	99	X

Grand Final
3	Sydney Kings	95	90	97	X	X
4	Tasmania JackJumpers	78	86	88	X	X

== Semifinals series ==
=== (1) Melbourne United vs. (4) Tasmania JackJumpers ===
28 April 2022	Melbourne United	74–63 (Series: Melbourne leads series, 1–0)	Tasmania JackJumpers	John Cain Arena, Melbourne
19:30	Scoring by quarter: 20–15, 21–21, 21–7, 12–20
ESPN	Pts: Agada 16; Rebs: White 10; Asts: Dellavedova 5	boxscore report	Pts: Adams 16; Rebs: Adams, Krslovic 5 Asts: Magette 6	Attendance: 5,268; Referees: Chris Reid, Mitch Hare, Nico Fernandez

30 April 2022	Tasmania JackJumpers	79–72 (Series: Series tied, 1–1)	Melbourne United	MyState Bank Arena, Hobart
20:00	Scoring by quarter: 17–12, 21–22, 21–25, 20–13
ESPN	Pts: McVeigh 15; Rebs: Magette, McDaniel 5 Asts: Bairstow 4	boxscore report	Pts: Goulding 18; Rebs: White 8 Asts: Agada, Dellavedova, Ili, Lual-Acuil 3	Attendance: 4,865; Referees: Chris Reid, Nico Fernandez, Mitch Hare

2 May 2022	Melbourne United	73–76 (Series: Tasmania wins series, 2–1)	Tasmania JackJumpers	John Cain Arena, Melbourne
19:30	Scoring by quarter: 25–21, 15–19, 14–20, 19–16
ESPN	Pts: Ili 18; Rebs: White 15; Asts: Dellavedova 7	boxscore report	Pts: Adams 30; Rebs: McIntosh 9 Asts: Magette 7	Attendance: 4,816; Referees: Chris Reid, Mitch Hare, James Griguol

Regular season series
Tasmania won 2–1 in the regular season series

1 January 2022

boxscore

Tasmania JackJumpers 72, Melbourne United 76

MyState Bank Arena, Hobart

6 February 2022

boxscore

Melbourne United 85, Tasmania JackJumpers 94

John Cain Arena, Melbourne

23 April 2022

boxscore

Tasmania JackJumpers 83, Melbourne United 61

MyState Bank Arena, Hobart

=== (2) Illawarra Hawks vs. (3) Sydney Kings ===
29 April 2022	Illawarra Hawks	79–89 (Series: Sydney leads series, 1–0)	Sydney Kings	WIN Entertainment Centre, Wollongong
19:30	Scoring by quarter: 24–22, 9–30, 24–22, 22–15
ESPN	Pts: Reath 26; Rebs: Reath 11; Asts: Rathan-Mayes 4	boxscore report	Pts: Adams 30; Rebs: Cooks, Martin 10; Asts: Adams 5	Attendance: 5,621; Referees: Vaughan Mayberry, Michael Aylen, Ruben Woolcock

1 May 2022	Sydney Kings	99–87 (Series: Sydney wins series, 2–0)	Illawarra Hawks	Qudos Bank Arena, Sydney
15:00	Scoring by quarter: 22–23, 22–31, 25–13, 30–20
10 Peach	Pts: Adams 29; Rebs: Cooks 11; Asts: Adams, Cooks 3	boxscore report	Pts: Harvey 21; Rebs: Cleveland 12; Asts: Harvey, Jessup 3	Attendance: 9,824; Referees: Vaughan Mayberry, Michael Aylen, Damien Lyons

Regular season series
Illawarra won 3–1 in the regular season series

11 December 2021

boxscore

Sydney Kings 84, Illawarra Hawks 92

Qudos Bank Arena, Sydney

13 January 2022

boxscore

Illawarra Hawks 97, Sydney Kings 89

WIN Entertainment Centre, Wollongong

14 April 2022

boxscore

Illawarra Hawks 102, Sydney Kings 107 (OT)

WIN Entertainment Centre, Wollongong

24 April 2022

boxscore

Sydney Kings 84, Illawarra Hawks 87

Qudos Bank Arena, Sydney

== Grand Final series ==
=== (3) Sydney Kings vs. (4) Tasmania JackJumpers ===
6 May 2022	Sydney Kings	95–78 (Series: Sydney leads series, 1–0)	Tasmania JackJumpers	Qudos Bank Arena, Sydney
19:30	Scoring by quarter: 23–19, 20–21, 28–18, 24–20
ESPN	Pts: Adams 18; Rebs: Cooks 11; Asts: Cooks 7	boxscore report	Pts: McIntosh, McVeigh 14; Rebs: Adams 8 Asts: Magette 10	Attendance: 12,765; Referees: Chris Reid, Vaughan Mayberry, Michael Aylen

8 May 2022	Tasmania JackJumpers	86–90 (Series: Sydney leads series, 2–0)	Sydney Kings	MyState Bank Arena, Hobart
14:30	Scoring by quarter: 27–17, 21–27, 22–24, 16–22
10 Peach	Pts: Adams 36; Rebs: Krslovic 10; Asts: Magette 5	boxscore report	Pts: Cooks, Martin, Vasiljevic 20; Rebs: Cooks, Martin 10; Asts: Bruce 7	Attendance: 4,738; Referees: Michael Aylen, Vaughan Mayberry, Chris Reid

11 May 2022	Sydney Kings	97–88 (Series: Sydney wins series, 3–0)	Tasmania JackJumpers	Qudos Bank Arena, Sydney
19:30	Scoring by quarter: 22–25, 25–23, 19–21, 31–19
ESPN	Pts: Cooks 23; Rebs: Martin 17; Asts: Bruce 8	boxscore report	Pts: Adams 27; Rebs: Magette 9 Asts: Magette 7	Attendance: 16,149; Referees: Vaughan Mayberry, Michael Aylen, Chris Reid

Regular season series
Sydney won 2–1 in the regular season series

22 December 2021

boxscore

Sydney Kings 83, Tasmania JackJumpers 71

Qudos Bank Arena, Sydney

4 February 2022

boxscore

Tasmania JackJumpers 77, Sydney Kings 70

MyState Bank Arena, Hobart

3 April 2022

boxscore

Tasmania JackJumpers 83, Sydney Kings 103

MyState Bank Arena, Hobart

== Media coverage ==
=== Television ===
Australian broadcast rights to the season are held by ESPN. All games are available live on ESPN and the streaming platform Kayo Freebies. Network 10 will broadcast Sunday afternoon games on 10 Peach and 10 Play.

== See also ==
- 2021–22 NBL season
- 2021–22 NBL regular season
