= 2021–22 Sydney Kings season =

Australian basketball club season

- NBL champions
- Head coach: (United States) Chase Buford
- Co-captains: (Australia) Shaun Bruce (Australia) Xavier Cooks
- Arena: Sydney SuperDome

NBL results
- Record: 19–9 (67.9%)
- Ladder: 3rd
- Finals finish: Champions (4th title) (Defeated JackJumpers 3–0)
- Stats at NBL.com.au

Player records
- Points: (United States) Adams 20.1
- Rebounds: (Australia) Cooks 9.8
- Assists: (United States) Adams 6.1
- All statistics correct as of 24 April 2022.

The 2021–22 NBL season was the 33rd season for the Sydney Kings in the NBL.

== Roster ==
Note: Flags indicate national team eligibility at FIBA-sanctioned events. Players may hold other non-FIBA nationalities not displayed.

2021–22 Sydney Kings roster
Players
Coaches

Pos.	No.	Nat.	Name	Ht.	Wt.	Age
C	1	(Australia)	Hunter, Jordan (injured)	2.08 m (6 ft 10 in)	104 kg (229 lb)	29 – 20 August 1997
G	2	(United States)	Adams, Jaylen (injured) (I)	1.88 m (6 ft 2 in)	86 kg (190 lb)	30 – 4 May 1996
G	3	(Australia)	Vasiljevic, Dejan	1.91 m (6 ft 3 in)	86 kg (190 lb)	29 – 26 April 1997
C	4	(Australia)	Maker, Makur (NS)	2.11 m (6 ft 11 in)	107 kg (236 lb)	26 – 4 November 2000
G	5	(Australia)	Glover, Angus	1.93 m (6 ft 4 in)	87 kg (192 lb)	28 – 8 September 1998
F	6	(Australia)	Galloway, Jaylin (DP)	2.01 m (6 ft 7 in)	82 kg (181 lb)	23 – 21 December 2002
G	7	(Australia)	Bruce, Shaun (C)	1.90 m (6 ft 3 in)	82 kg (181 lb)	35 – 13 January 1991
F/C	8	(South Sudan)	Maker, Matur	2.08 m (6 ft 10 in)	95 kg (209 lb)	28 – 1 January 1998
G/F	9	(Australia)	Swaka Lo Buluk, Wani	1.94 m (6 ft 4 in)	87 kg (192 lb)	25 – 9 June 2001
F	10	(Australia)	Cooks, Xavier (C)	2.03 m (6 ft 8 in)	84 kg (185 lb)	31 – 19 September 1995
F	12	(United States)	Martin, Jarell (I)	2.08 m (6 ft 10 in)	108 kg (238 lb)	32 – 24 May 1994
F	13	(New Zealand)	Vodanovich, Tom	2.01 m (6 ft 7 in)	104 kg (229 lb)	32 – 28 July 1994
G	14	(Australia)	Bayles, Biwali	1.88 m (6 ft 2 in)	84 kg (185 lb)	24 – 15 February 2002
G	20	(Australia)	Mitchell, Iggy (DP)	1.85 m (6 ft 1 in)	83 kg (183 lb)
G	21	(United States)	Clark, Ian (I)	1.91 m (6 ft 3 in)	79 kg (174 lb)	35 – 7 March 1991
G	30	(Australia)	Hodgson, Jayden (DP)	1.90 m (6 ft 3 in)

Head coach

- (United States) Chase Buford

Assistant coach(es)

- (United States) Kevin Lisch
- (Australia) Fleur McIntyre
- (Australia) Lachlan Lonergan
- (Australia) Daniel Kickert

Legend

- (C) Team captain
- (DP) Development player
- (IN) Inactive
- (I) Import player
- (SRP) Special restricted player
- (NS) Next Star player
- Injured

- Roster
Updated: 7 May 2022

== Pre-season ==
=== Game log ===
2021 NBL Blitz game log
Total: 1–2 (Home: 1–1; Road: 0–1)
November: 1–2 (Home: 1–1; Road: 0–1)

Game	Date	Team	Score	High points	High rebounds	High assists	Location Attendance	Record
1	13 November	S.E. Melbourne	L 75–81	Jarell Martin (15)	Martin, Vodanovich (9)	Xavier Cooks (3)	Melbourne Sports and Aquatic Centre closed event	0–1
2	15 November	Melbourne	W 80–75	Angus Glover (18)	Xavier Cooks (14)	Bayles, Cooks (4)	Melbourne Sports and Aquatic Centre closed event	1–1
3	18 November	@ New Zealand	L 97–93	Jaylen Adams (16)	Xavier Cooks (11)	Adams, Cooks (3)	Melbourne Sports and Aquatic Centre closed event	1–2

Cancelled

Game	Date	Team	Score	High points	High rebounds	High assists	Location Attendance	Record
1	27 November	@ Illawarra	Cancelled					

== Regular season ==
=== Ladder ===
Pos	2021–22 NBL season											
Pos	Team	Pld	W	L	PCT	Last 5	Streak	Home	Away	PF	PA	PP
1	Melbourne United	28	20	8	71.43%	4–1	L1	9–5	11–3	2455	2244	109.40%
2	Illawarra Hawks	28	19	9	67.86%	4–1	W2	8–6	11–3	2498	2345	106.52%
3	Sydney Kings	28	19	9	67.86%	3–2	L1	9–5	10–4	2397	2313	103.63%
4	Tasmania JackJumpers	28	17	11	60.71%	4–1	W4	8–6	9–5	2230	2220	100.45%
5	Perth Wildcats	28	16	12	57.14%	2–3	L2	7–7	9–5	2495	2377	104.96%
6	S.E. Melbourne Phoenix	28	15	13	53.57%	3–2	W2	7–7	8–6	2456	2424	101.32%
7	Adelaide 36ers	28	10	18	35.71%	3–2	W1	6–8	4–10	2283	2346	97.31%
8	Brisbane Bullets	28	10	18	35.71%	2–3	L2	6–8	4–10	2379	2500	95.16%
9	Cairns Taipans	28	9	19	32.14%	1–4	W1	5–9	4–10	2228	2408	92.52%
10	New Zealand Breakers	28	5	23	17.86%	0–5	L10	2–12	3–11	2234	2478	90.15%

Updated to match(es) played on 24 April 2022. Source: NBL.com.au

=== Ladder progression ===
- Numbers highlighted in green indicate that the team finished the round inside the top four.
- Numbers highlighted in blue indicates the team finished first on the ladder in that round.
- Numbers highlighted in red indicates the team finished last place on the ladder in that round.

2021–22 NBL season
Team	1	2	3	4	5	6	7	8	9	10	11	12	13	14	15	16	17	18	19	20	21
Adelaide 36ers	8	6	8	8	8	8	7	8	8	8	8	7	8	8	8	8	8	9	9	8	7
Brisbane Bullets	7	5	7	6	6	7	6	5	7	9	7	8	7	7	7	7	7	7	7	7	8
Cairns Taipans	9	7	4	4	5	5	5	6	9	7	9	10	9	9	10	9	9	8	8	9	9
Illawarra Hawks	3	2	3	3	3	3	3	4	4	5	4	5	4	4	5	4	4	3	3	3	2
Melbourne United	6	9	6	5	4	4	1	1	2	3	1	1	1	1	1	1	1	1	1	1	1
New Zealand Breakers	10	10	10	10	10	10	10	10	10	10	10	9	10	10	9	10	10	10	10	10	10
Perth Wildcats	2	3	1	1	1	1	2	2	3	1	2	3	3	3	2	2	3	4	4	4	5
S.E. Melbourne Phoenix	1	1	2	2	2	2	4	3	1	2	3	2	2	2	4	5	5	6	6	6	6
Sydney Kings	5	4	5	7	7	6	8	7	5	6	5	4	5	5	3	3	2	2	2	2	3
Tasmania JackJumpers	4	8	9	9	9	9	9	9	6	4	6	6	6	6	6	6	6	5	5	5	4

=== Game log ===
2021–22 game log
Total: 19–9 (Home: 9–5; Road: 10–4)
December: 3–3 (Home: 3–2; Road: 0–1)

Game	Date	Team	Score	High points	High rebounds	High assists	Location Attendance	Record
1	5 December	Melbourne	W 79–74	Jaylen Adams (15)	Adams, Martin (8)	Xavier Cooks (5)	Qudos Bank Arena; 8,632	1–0
2	11 December	Illawarra	L 84–92	Angus Glover (16)	Xavier Cooks (11)	Bruce, Cooks (5)	Qudos Bank Arena; 6,212	1–1
3	16 December	@ Melbourne	L 89–47	Xavier Cooks (12)	Xavier Cooks (6)	Biwali Bayles (4)	John Cain Arena; 4,786	1–2
4	18 December	S.E. Melbourne	W 84–73	Xavier Cooks (19)	Jarell Martin (13)	Bayles, Bruce, Cooks, Glover (2)	Qudos Bank Arena; 6,379	2–2
5	22 December	Tasmania	W 83–71	Jarell Martin (24)	Jarell Martin (11)	Shaun Bruce (5)	Qudos Bank Arena; 4,612	3–2
6	26 December	Melbourne	L 68–82	Jarell Martin (19)	Xavier Cooks (10)	Xavier Cooks (4)	Qudos Bank Arena; 4,725	3–3

January: 2–3 (Home: 2–1; Road: 0–2)

Game	Date	Team	Score	High points	High rebounds	High assists	Location Attendance	Record
7	13 January	@ Illawarra	L 97–89	Jarell Martin (23)	Xavier Cooks (14)	Jaylen Adams (8)	WIN Entertainment Centre; 1,994	3–4
8	16 January	New Zealand	L 75–82	Xavier Cooks (19)	Xavier Cooks (12)	Bruce, Vasiljevic (4)	Qudos Bank Arena; 4,356	3–5
9	21 January	@ Brisbane	L 96–87	Jaylen Adams (33)	Jarell Martin (12)	Jaylen Adams (7)	Nissan Arena; 2,574	3–6
10	23 January	Brisbane	W 97–73	Dejan Vasiljevic (23)	Jarell Martin (12)	Jaylen Adams (6)	Qudos Bank Arena; 4,237	4–6
11	30 January	Perth	W 96–81	Jaylen Adams (30)	Xavier Cooks (9)	Jaylen Adams (9)	Qudos Bank Arena; 5,864	5–6

February: 5–1 (Home: 3–0; Road: 2–1)

Game	Date	Team	Score	High points	High rebounds	High assists	Location Attendance	Record
12	4 February	@ Tasmania	L 77–70	Jaylen Adams (24)	Xavier Cooks (15)	Jaylen Adams (3)	MyState Bank Arena; 4,643	5–7
13	6 February	New Zealand	W 84–65	Dejan Vasiljevic (23)	Jarell Martin (12)	Jaylen Adams (7)	Qudos Bank Arena; 5,011	6–7
14	10 February	@ S.E. Melbourne	W 87–92	Xavier Cooks (23)	Adams, Martin (8)	Jaylen Adams (6)	John Cain Arena; 2,133	7–7
15	13 February	Brisbane	W 71–69	Jarell Martin (17)	Xavier Cooks (12)	Adams, Bruce, Glover (4)	Qudos Bank Arena; 5,543	7–6
16	19 February	Perth	W 98–95	Jaylen Adams (31)	Xavier Cooks (9)	Jaylen Adams (10)	Qudos Bank Arena; 7,143	9–7
17	27 February	@ Adelaide	W 90–93	Jaylen Adams (26)	Xavier Cooks (10)	Jaylen Adams (8)	Adelaide Entertainment Centre; 4,813	10–7

March: 4–0 (Home: 1–0; Road: 3–0)

Game	Date	Team	Score	High points	High rebounds	High assists	Location Attendance	Record
18	6 March	Cairns	W 98–88	Xavier Cooks (23)	Xavier Cooks (13)	Xavier Cooks (5)	Qudos Bank Arena; 9,112	11–7
19	13 March	@ Cairns	W 77–86	Jaylen Adams (24)	Makur Maker (10)	Jaylen Adams (7)	Cairns Convention Centre; 3,629	12–7
20	19 March	@ S.E. Melbourne	W 89–91	Jarell Martin (24)	Jarell Martin (8)	Jaylen Adams (8)	John Cain Arena; 2,717	13–7
21	26 March	@ Perth	W 80–102	Jaylen Adams (20)	Makur Maker (9)	Jaylen Adams (8)	RAC Arena; 6,906	14–7

April: 5–2 (Home: 0–2; Road: 5–0)

Game	Date	Team	Score	High points	High rebounds	High assists	Location Attendance	Record
22	3 April	@ Tasmania	W 83–103	Jaylen Adams (20)	Xavier Cooks (9)	Xavier Cooks (9)	MyState Bank Arena; 4,738	15–7
23	9 April	@ Adelaide	W 77–84	Xavier Cooks (22)	Xavier Cooks (9)	Jaylen Adams (5)	Adelaide Entertainment Centre; 4,748	16–7
24	12 April	@ New Zealand	W 70–76	Jaylen Adams (19)	Xavier Cooks (7)	Jaylen Adams (5)	Bendigo Stadium; 1,543	17–7
25	14 April	@ Illawarra	W 102–107 (OT)	Dejan Vasiljevic (33)	Xavier Cooks (13)	Adams, Cooks (7)	WIN Entertainment Centre; 4,872	18–7
26	17 April	Adelaide	L 82–90	Jaylen Adams (28)	Xavier Cooks (14)	Jaylen Adams (4)	Qudos Bank Arena; 10,260	18–8
27	21 April	@ Cairns	W 77–87	Ian Clark (21)	Xavier Cooks (12)	Shaun Bruce (4)	Cairns Convention Centre; 3,150	19–8
26	24 April	Illawarra	L 84–87	Xavier Cooks (20)	Xavier Cooks (14)	Ian Clark (6)	Qudos Bank Arena; 12,632	19–9

2021–22 season schedule

== Postseason ==
2022 finals game log
Total: 5–0 (Home: 3–0; Road: 2–0)
Semifinals: 2–0 (Home: 1–0; Road: 1–0)

Game	Date	Team	Score	High points	High rebounds	High assists	Location Attendance	Series
1	29 April	@ Illawarra	W 79–89	Jaylen Adams (30)	Cooks, Martin (10)	Jaylen Adams (5)	WIN Entertainment Centre; 5,621	1–0
2	1 May	Illawarra	W 99–87	Jaylen Adams (29)	Xavier Cooks (11)	Adams, Cooks (3)	Qudos Bank Arena; 9,824	2–0

NBL Finals: 3–0 (Home: 2–0; Road: 1–0)

Game	Date	Team	Score	High points	High rebounds	High assists	Location Attendance	Series
3	6 May	Tasmania	W 95–78	Jaylen Adams (18)	Xavier Cooks (11)	Xavier Cooks (7)	Qudos Bank Arena; 12,765	3–0
4	8 May	@ Tasmania	W 86–90	Cooks, Martin, Vasiljevic (20)	Cooks, Martin (10)	Shaun Bruce (7)	MyState Bank Arena; 4,738	4–0
5	11 May	Tasmania	W 97–88	Xavier Cooks (23)	Jarell Martin (17)	Shaun Bruce (8)	Qudos Bank Arena; 16,149	5–0

2022 finals schedule

== Transactions ==
=== Re-signed ===
Player	Signed
Jordan Hunter	18 June
Jarell Martin	26 June
Tom Vodanovich	27 June
Xavier Cooks	30 June
Jaylin Galloway	22 July

=== Additions ===
Player	Signed	Former team
Biwali Bayles	27 April	Hawaii Rainbow Warriors
Wani Swaka Lo Buluk	9 July	Perth Wildcats
R. J. Hunter	23 July	Galatasaray
Makur Maker	21 August	Howard Bison
Jaylen Adams	22 August	Milwaukee Bucks
Matur Maker	27 August	Rio Grande Valley Vipers
Ian Clark	12 February	Xinjiang Flying Tigers

=== Subtractions ===
Player	Reason left	New team
Craig Moller	Free agent	s.Oliver Würzburg
Brad Newley	Free agent	Melbourne United
Jarrad Weeks	Free agent	Tasmania JackJumpers
Casper Ware	Free agent	Enisey
Dexter Kernich-Drew	Free agent	Waverley Falcons
Daniel Kickert	Retired	Sydney Kings (assistant)
R.J. Hunter	Released	N/A

== Awards ==
=== Club awards ===
- Members Player of the Year: Jaylen Adams & Xavier Cooks
- Coaches Award: Xavier Cooks
- Player's Player: Xavier Cooks
- Defensive Player: Xavier Cooks
- Club Person of the Year: Fleur McIntyre
- Club MVP: Jaylen Adams

== See also ==
- 2021–22 NBL season
- Sydney Kings
