= Fleur McIntyre =

Australian basketball player and coach

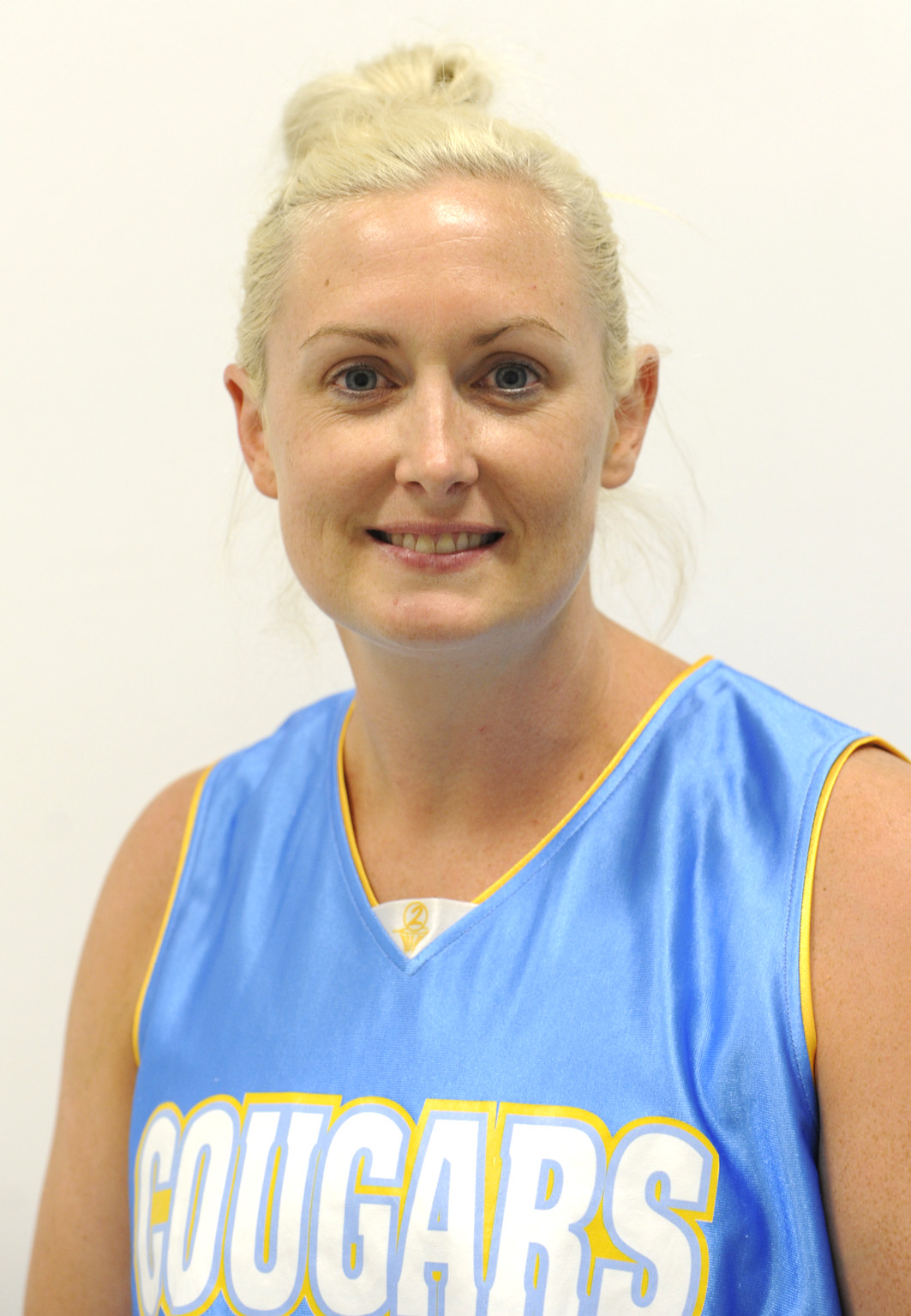
- McIntyre with the Cockburn Cougars in 2014

Phoenix Mercury
- Title: Assistant general manager
- League: WNBA

Personal information
- Born: 24 October 1979 (age 47) Kalgoorlie, Western Australia, Australia
- Listed height: 176 cm (5 ft 9 in)

Career information
- High school: John Paul College (Kalgoorlie, Western Australia)
- Playing career: 1995–2014
- Position: Forward
- Coaching career: 2006–present

Career history

Playing
- 1995–2003; 2005–2006; 2008; 2011; 2013–2014: Cockburn Cougars

Coaching
- 2006–2007: Perth Lynx (assistant)
- 2010–2011: Cockburn Cougars
- 2014; 2020: Cockburn Cougars (assistant)
- 2021–2024: Sydney Kings (assistant)

Career highlights
- 2× NBL champion (2022, 2023)

Fleur McIntyre (born 24 October 1979) is an Australian basketball coach and former player who is currently an assistant general manager of the Phoenix Mercury of the Women's National Basketball Association (WNBA). She played 15 seasons in the State Basketball League (SBL) for the Cockburn Cougars, where towards the end of her playing career she began coaching as well, serving as head coach of the Cougars women's team in 2010 and 2011. In 2021, she joined the Sydney Kings of the National Basketball League (NBL) as an assistant coach, where she won two NBL championships in 2022 and 2023.

== Early life ==
McIntyre was born and raised in Kalgoorlie, Western Australia. Her father was a mining engineer and she subsequently lived in a number of small mining towns in Western Australia. She grew up playing multiple sports in a sporting family, with her parents active in sport, as were her two brothers and one sister.

McIntyre attended Kalgoorlie Catholic Primary School and John Paul College and played in the Kalgoorlie-Boulder Basketball Association for Christian Brothers College (CBC) Basketball Club. She finished Year 10 at John Paul College before her family moved to Perth in 1995.

McIntyre served as Under 18 and Under 20 state basketball captain for Western Australia Metro.

== Playing career ==
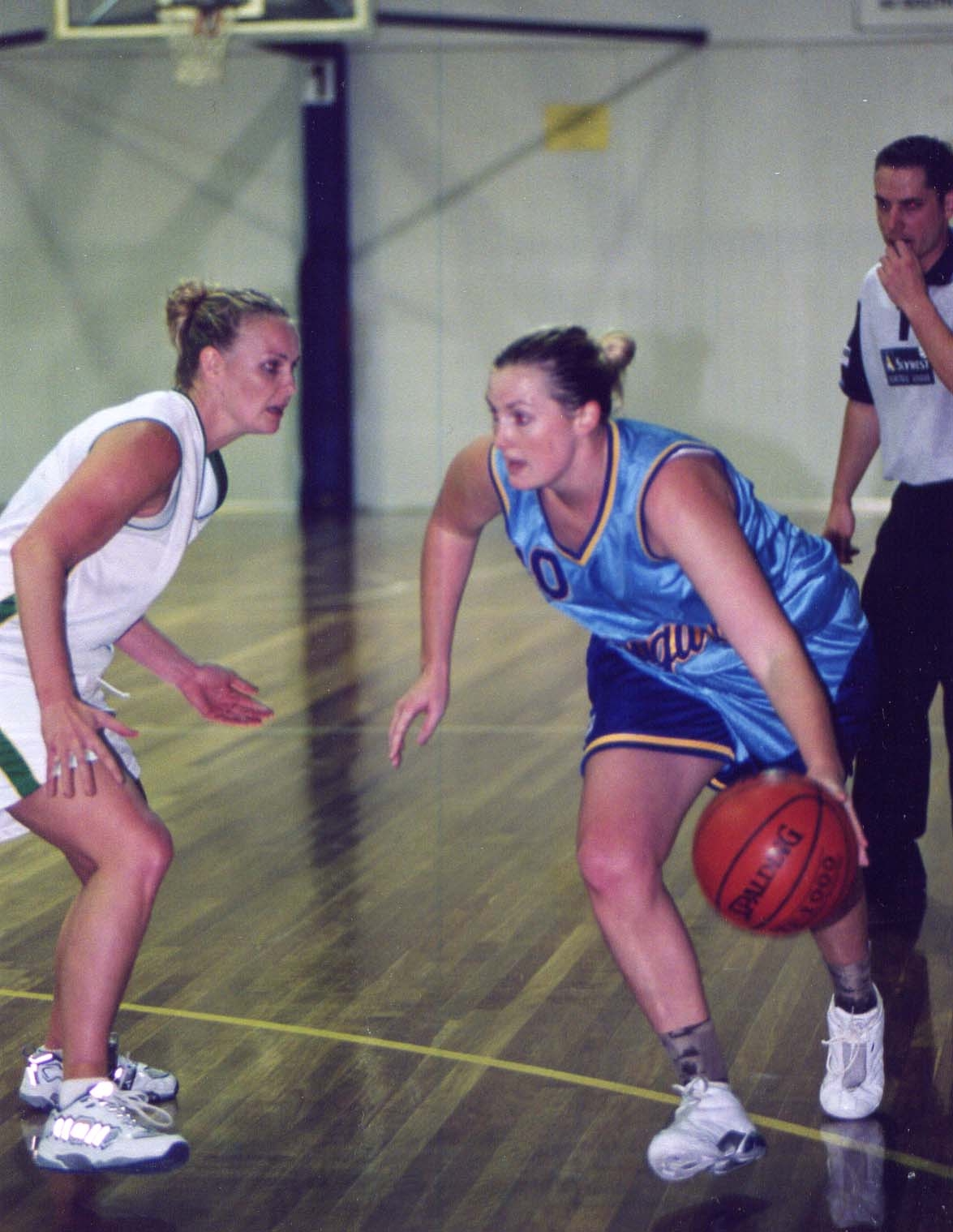
McIntyre with the Cougars in 2003

McIntyre pursued State Basketball League (SBL) opportunities with the Willetton Tigers but eventually joined the Cockburn Cougars, where she was the club's 1995 rookie of the year. She was initially listed as their No. 10 player but was eventually rewarded with a place in the starting five and by 1999, was captaining the team. She endured a couple of knee surgeries early in her career.

McIntyre played for the Cougars every year between 1995 and 2003, which was followed by stints in 2005, 2006, 2008, 2011 and 2013. Injury limited her to one final game for the Cougars in 2014, as she finished her SBL career with 270 games. She earned life membership with the Cougars and won the club's MVP award five times.

== Coaching career ==
=== Perth Lynx ===
McIntyre served as an assistant coach with the Perth Lynx of the Women's National Basketball League (WNBL) under head coach Paul O'Brien in the 2006–07 season.

=== Cockburn Cougars ===
In October 2009, McIntyre was appointed head coach of the Cockburn Cougars women's team for the 2010 State Basketball League season. She led the team to tenth place with a 6–16 record and was subsequently re-appointed as head coach for the 2011 season. She served as player-coach in 2011, which she later described as the "worst decision" and that she was "horrible at it". The team made a quick start to the season before finishing seventh with 11 wins and losing to the Perry Lakes Hawks in the quarter-finals. She stepped down as coach in September 2011.

McIntyre re-joined the Cougars women's team as assistant coach under head coach Deanna Smith for the 2014 season. In September 2014, she coached the WSBL All-Stars in an exhibition match against the West Coast Waves.

In 2020, McIntyre served as assistant coach for the Cougars men's team under head coach Andrew Cooper during the West Coast Classic.

=== Sydney Kings ===
On 15 July 2021, McIntyre was appointed an assistant coach of the Sydney Kings of the National Basketball League (NBL) under new head coach Chase Buford. Desiring a career change after more than a decade pursuing an academic career, McIntyre received a call from former NBA player and long-time friend Luc Longley who encouraged her to apply for the assistant coach role at the Kings. The Kings were interested in her professional background and her focus on connecting with people and building relationships. She was tasked with serving a key role in player development and Buford later referred to McIntyre as the "glue" of the club. McIntyre became the fifth female to be hired in the NBL coaching ranks behind Michele Timms, Lori Chizik, Tracy York and Chanel Pompallier.

McIntyre helped guide the Kings to the NBL Grand Final in the 2021–22 season, where they defeated the Tasmania JackJumpers 3–0 in the best-of-five series. She became the first woman to win an NBL championship. She made a big impression in her first season at the Kings, winning the Club Person of the Year.

McIntyre was given the opportunity to be the Kings' head coach during the first game of the 2022 NBL Blitz pre-season tournament, becoming the first female to do so. As assistant coach, she helped the Kings return to the NBL Grand Final in the 2023–23 season, where they defeated the New Zealand Breakers 3–2 to win back-to-back championships.

Following the departure of Chase Buford at the conclusion of the 2022–23 season, McIntyre was touted as a possible candidate to replace him as head coach. She ultimately continued on as an assistant coach under new head coach Mahmoud Abdelfattah, extending her contract with the Kings for a further two seasons.

In July 2023, McIntyre worked as a guest coach with the San Antonio Spurs during the NBA Summer League in Las Vegas. She was invited by long-time Spurs executive, R. C. Buford, the father of Chase Buford. She served under former NBL player and coach, Matthew Nielsen.

After winning seven of their first 10 games of the 2023–24 NBL season, the Kings lost 13 of their remaining 19 matches, including the play-in qualifier defeat to the New Zealand Breakers.

== Executive career ==
In January 2024, McIntyre was appointed an assistant general manager of the Phoenix Mercury of the Women's National Basketball Association (WNBA). She commenced her position in April following the conclusion of the 2023–24 NBL season. She remained in the position as of November 2025.

== Personal life ==
McIntyre's father, Colin, is considered one of the best footballers the Goldfields region has produced. He won the Mitchell Medal as the Goldfields Football League's (GFL) fairest and best player in 1979 while playing for Kambalda, and in 1993 was named captain of a special GFL All-Stars team. Her brother, Sheldon, also played for the Cockburn Cougars in the SBL and also earned life membership. As of January 2024, she had a brother who lived on the east coast of the United States.

McIntyre's personal resume includes a Bachelor of Science (hons), Graduate Certificate in Research Methods and Doctor of Philosophy (PhD). In 2021, she left her job of 16 years at the University of Notre Dame in Fremantle, where she was Discipline Head of Exercise and Sports Science. At the time, she was finishing her PhD and had been promoted to associate professor. She lectured in gender and sport.

McIntyre served on the SBL Commission between 2014 and 2018. Up until 2021, she had worked with Basketball Western Australia's high performance programs and coached several state teams.

McIntyre is a close friend with former Perth Wildcats player, Greg Hire. She served as a director for his charity, A Stitch in Time, and was the master of ceremonies at his wedding.
