= Tasmania JackJumpers =

- 2026–27 Tasmania JackJumpers season
- League: NBL
- Founded: 2020; 6 years ago
- History: Tasmania JackJumpers; 2021–present
- Arena: MyState Bank Arena; Silverdome
- Capacity: 4,800
- Location: Hobart, Tasmania
- Team colours: Burnham green, tropical rainforest green, yellow
- CEO: Trent Jacobs
- Chairman: Steve Old
- General manager: Darren Smith
- Head coach: Scott Roth
- Team captain: Will Magnay
- Ownership: Altor Capital (majority owner)
- Championships: 1 (2024)
- Website: JackJumpers.com.au
Home	Away

The Tasmania JackJumpers are an Australian professional basketball team based in Hobart, Tasmania, who entered the National Basketball League (NBL) in the 2021–22 season, and play their home games at MyState Bank Arena and the Silverdome. The team is named after the jack jumper ant, a species of venomous ant predominantly found in the island state. The JackJumpers won their maiden NBL championship in 2024.

== Franchise history ==
In February 2019, the National Basketball League (NBL) indicated that Tasmania was on the league's future expansion radar. Twelve months later, it was revealed that Tasmania had secured an NBL licence and a team would enter the league in the 2021–22 season.

On 1 October 2020, the team name was revealed as the Tasmania JackJumpers. On the eve of the team's first NBL game, Tasmanian band Luca Brasi released "Jackies Are On the March", an original theme for the team.

In their NBL debut on 3 December 2021, the JackJumpers defeated the Brisbane Bullets 83–74 in overtime at MyState Bank Arena in Hobart. The JackJumpers finished the regular season in fourth place with a 17–11 record and faced the first-placed Melbourne United in the semi-finals, where they defeated United 2–1 to advance to the NBL Grand Final series. They ultimately lost 3–0 in the grand final to the Sydney Kings.

In the 2023–24 NBL season, the JackJumpers returned to the NBL Grand Final series with a 2–1 semi-finals series victory over the Perth Wildcats. They went on to win their maiden NBL championship with a 3–2 grand final series victory over Melbourne United, becoming the first Tasmanian NBL champions since Launceston Casino City in 1981.

As NBL champions, the JackJumpers competed in the 2024 FIBA Intercontinental Cup, becoming the first team from Oceania to play in the FIBA Intercontinental Cup. Tasmania finished third, after defeating Al Riyadi from Lebanon in the third place game.

In the 2024–25 NBL season, the JackJumpers started with a 3–8 record and went on to miss the top six on percentage at 13–16.

In February 2025, NBL owner Larry Kestelman sold the JackJumpers to a private capital firm, Altor Capital.

In August 2025 it was announced that the JackJumpers had secured the next expansion license for the Women's National Basketball League, with the intention to establish a women's team to commence playing in the 2026–27 WNBL season. They will share facilities with the men's team in Hobart, and also intend to play at least half of their matches in the north of the state. The team name and branding was announced as Tasmania Jewels in December 2025.

== Home arena and training facilities ==
The JackJumpers play most of their home games at MyState Bank Arena, located in Glenorchy, part of the metropolitan Hobart region. The Silverdome, located in Launceston, also hosts a minimum of two home games per year.

Having previously trained at the Kingborough Sports Centre, a $20 million purpose-built training facility for the JackJumpers and the Jewels opened adjacent to the sports centre in July 2026.

== Current roster ==
Note: Flags indicate national team eligibility at FIBA-sanctioned events. Players may hold other non-FIBA nationalities not displayed.

Tasmania JackJumpers roster
Players
Coaches

Pos.	No.	Nat.	Name	Ht.	Wt.
G	0	(United States)	Hamilton, Bryce (injured) (I)	1.93 m (6 ft 4 in)	93 kg (205 lb)
G	1	(Australia)	Armstrong, Taran (VC)	1.96 m (6 ft 5 in)	88 kg (194 lb)
F	4	(Australia)	Richardson, Jed (DP)	2.08 m (6 ft 10 in)
F	5	(South Sudan)	Deng, Majok (injured)	2.05 m (6 ft 9 in)	84 kg (185 lb)
G	6	(Australia)	Stattmann, Kody	2.02 m (6 ft 8 in)	91 kg (201 lb)
G	7	(United States)	Johnson, David (I)	1.93 m (6 ft 4 in)	92 kg (203 lb)
G/F	8	(Australia)	Haywood, Ryley (DP)	1.94 m (6 ft 4 in)
G	9	(Australia)	Stoddart, Nicholas (IRP)	1.88 m (6 ft 2 in)
G	10	(Australia)	Ayre, Ben	1.84 m (6 ft 0 in)	80 kg (176 lb)
F	11	(Australia)	Marshall, Nick (injured)	1.98 m (6 ft 6 in)	90 kg (198 lb)
F	12	(New Zealand)	Gold, Ben (injured)	2.11 m (6 ft 11 in)	107 kg (236 lb)
C	22	(Australia)	Magnay, Will (C)	2.08 m (6 ft 10 in)	111 kg (245 lb)
G	31	(United States)	Mathias, Dakota (I)	1.93 m (6 ft 4 in)	91 kg (201 lb)
F	33	(Australia)	Bannan, Josh (VC)	2.08 m (6 ft 10 in)	100 kg (220 lb)

Head coach

- (United States) Scott Roth

Assistant coach(es)

- (Australia) Nathan Brereton
- (Australia) Mark Radford
- (Australia) Jarrad Weeks

Team manager

- (Australia) Mark Chivers

Legend

- (C) Team captain
- (DP) Development player
- (IN) Inactive
- (I) Import player
- (IRP) Injury replacement player
- Injured

- Roster
Updated: 20 November 2026

== Honour roll ==
NBL Championships:	1 (2024)
Regular Season Champions:	0
NBL Finals Appearances:	4 (2022, 2023, 2024, 2026)
NBL Grand Final appearances:	2 (2022, 2024)
NBL Grand Final MVP:	Jack McVeigh (2024)
All-NBL First Team:	Milton Doyle (2023)
All-NBL Second Team:	Josh Adams (2022), Milton Doyle (2024), Jack McVeigh (2024), Bryce Hamilton, (2026)
NBL Next Generation Award:	N/A
NBL Most Improved Player:	Sean Macdonald (2024)
NBL Coach of the Year:	Scott Roth (2022)
NBL Best Sixth Man:	N/A
NBL Best Defensive Player:	N/A
GameTime by Kmart:	Jack McVeigh (2022), Majok Deng (2025)

== Season by season ==
NBL champions	League champions	Runners-up	Finals berth

Season	Tier	League	Regular season					Post-season	Head coach	Captain	Club MVP
Season	Tier	League	Finish	Played	Wins	Losses	Win %	Post-season	Head coach	Captain	Club MVP
Tasmania JackJumpers
2021–22	1	NBL	4th	28	17	11	.607	Won semifinals (Melbourne) 2–1; Lost NBL finals (Sydney) 0–3	Scott Roth	Clint Steindl	Josh Adams
2022–23	1	NBL	4th	28	16	12	.571	Won seeding qualifier (Cairns) 87–79; Lost semifinals (New Zealand) 1–2	Scott Roth	Clint Steindl	Milton Doyle
2023–24	1	NBL	3rd	28	16	12	.571	Won seeding qualifier (Illawarra) 92–76; Won semifinals (Perth) 2–1; Won NBL finals (Melbourne) 3–2	Scott Roth	Clint Steindl	Jack McVeigh
2024–25	1	NBL	7th	29	13	16	.448	Did not qualify	Scott Roth	Clint Steindl	Jordon Crawford
2025–26	1	NBL	6th	33	14	19	.424	Lost play-in qualifier (Melbourne) 68–82	Scott Roth	Will Magnay	Josh Bannan
Regular season record				146	76	70	.521	0 regular season champions			
Finals record				20	10	10	.500	1 NBL championships			

As of the end of the 2025–26 season
