= Jarell Martin =

American basketball player (born 1994)

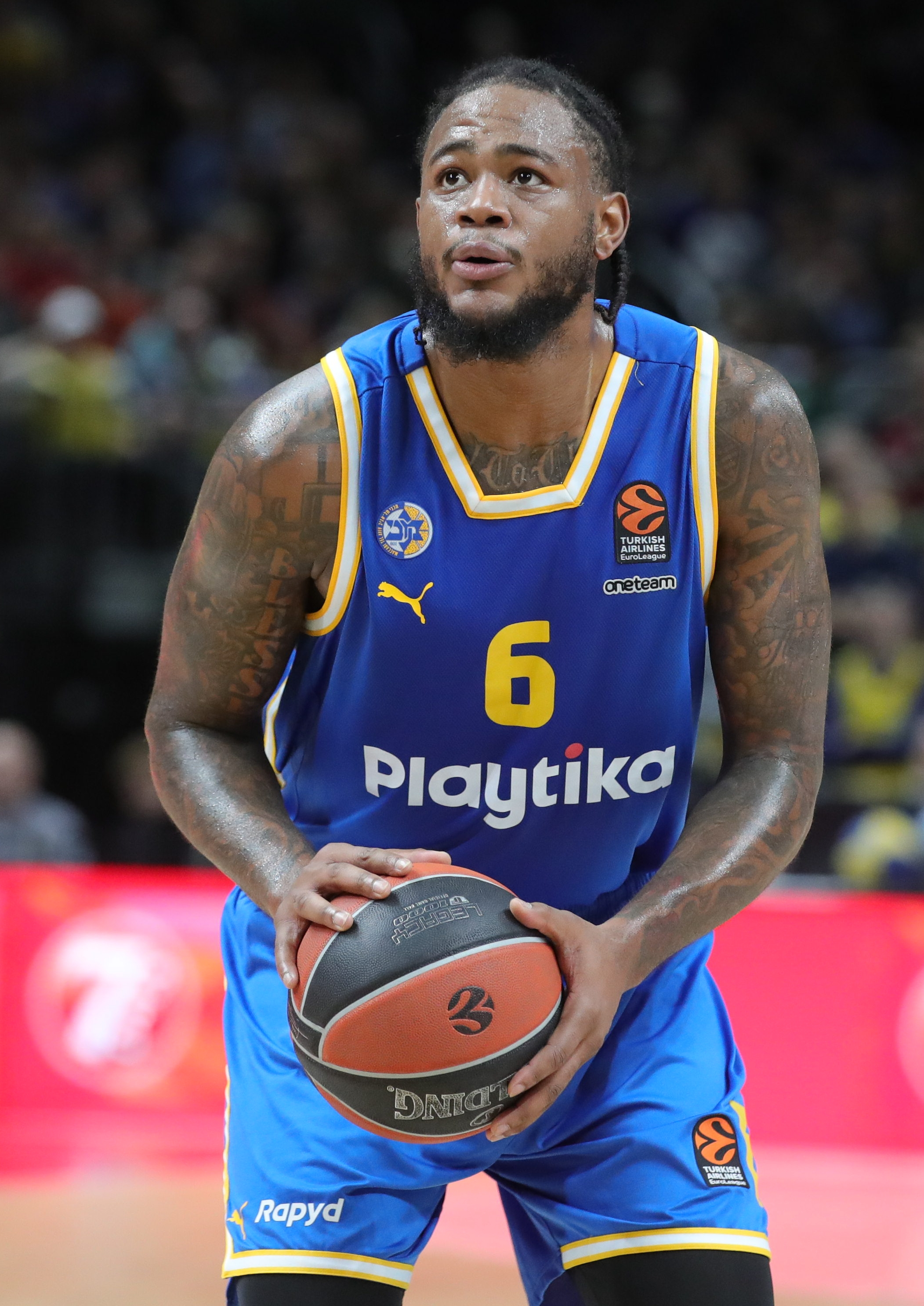
- Martin with Maccabi Tel Aviv in 2022

No. 1 – Koshigaya Alphas
- Position: Power forward
- League: B.League

Personal information
- Born: May 24, 1994 (age 32) Baton Rouge, Louisiana, U.S.
- Listed height: 6 ft 10 in (2.08 m)
- Listed weight: 239 lb (108 kg)

Career information
- High school: Madison Prep (Baton Rouge, Louisiana)
- College: LSU (2013–2015)
- NBA draft: 2015: 1st round, 25th overall pick
- Drafted by: Memphis Grizzlies
- Playing career: 2015–present

Career history
- 2015–2018: Memphis Grizzlies
- 2015–2017: →Iowa Energy
- 2017: →Memphis Hustle
- 2018–2019: Orlando Magic
- 2019–2020: Shenzhen Aviators
- 2020: Rio Grande Valley Vipers
- 2020–2022: Sydney Kings
- 2022–2023: Maccabi Tel Aviv
- 2023–2024: Galatasaray
- 2024–2025: Adelaide 36ers
- 2025: Suwon KT Sonicboom
- 2025–present: Koshigaya Alphas

Career highlights
- Israeli League champion (2023); Israeli League Cup winner (2022); NBL champion (2022); First-team All-SEC (2015); SEC All-Freshman team (2014); McDonald's All-American (2013); First-team Parade All-American (2013); Louisiana Mr. Basketball (2013)
- Stats at NBA.com
- Stats at Basketball Reference

Jarell Montrel Martin (born May 24, 1994) is an American professional basketball player for the Koshigaya Alphas of the Japanese B.League. He played college basketball for the LSU Tigers. Martin was selected by the Memphis Grizzlies as the 25th overall pick in the 2015 NBA draft. He spent four seasons in the National Basketball Association (NBA): three with the Grizzlies and one with the Orlando Magic. Martin joined the Sydney Kings of the NBL in 2020 and won an NBL championship in 2022. He won an Israeli League championship while playing with Maccabi Tel Aviv in 2023.

== High school career ==
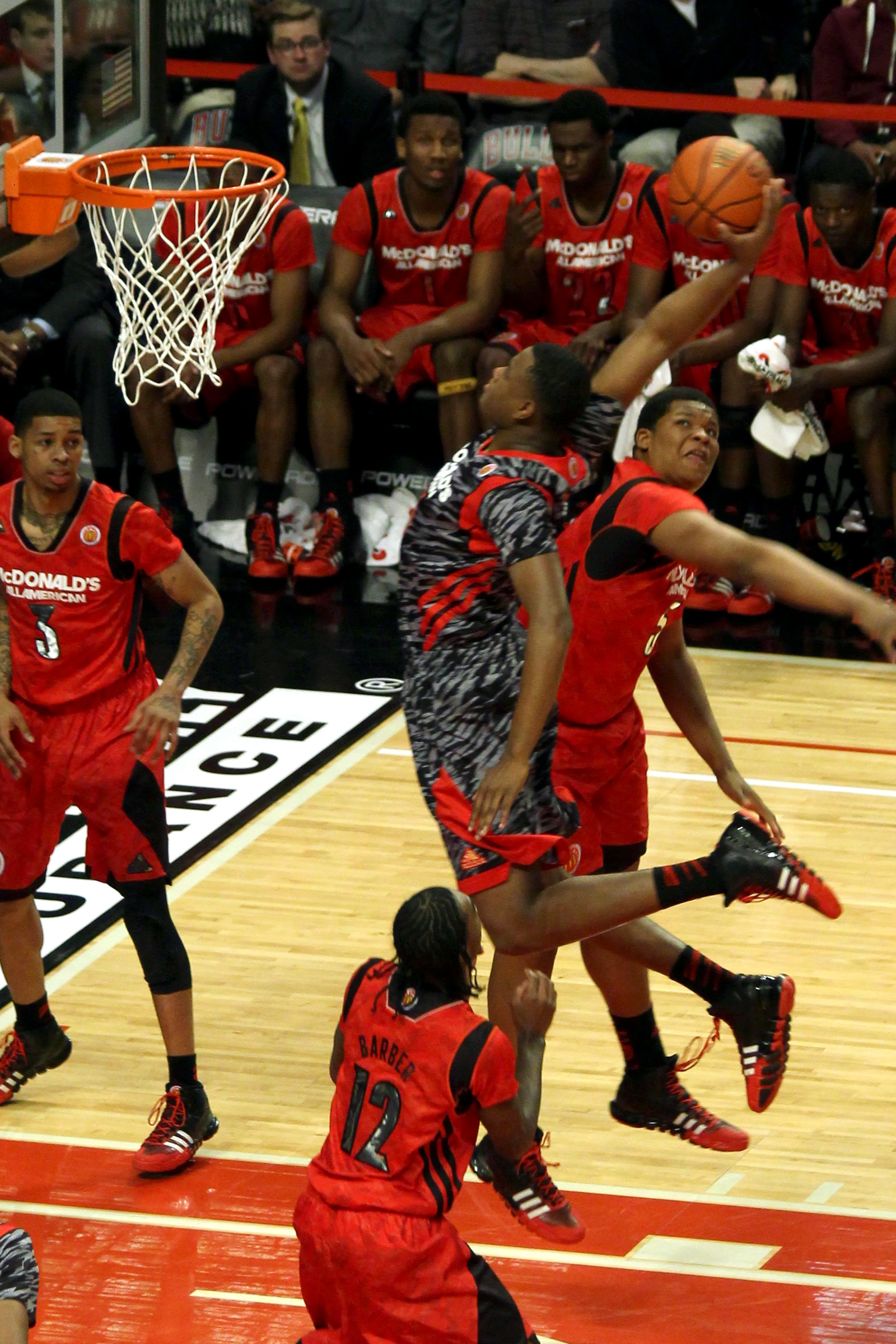
Martin in the 2013 McDonald's All-American Boys Game

As one of the top prospects in the country, Martin was selected as a McDonald's All-American, the first for LSU head coach Johnny Jones. Martin was also the winner of the 2013 Mr. Basketball award given annually by the Louisiana Sports Writers Association to the top player in the state of Louisiana.

Considered a five-star recruit by ESPN.com, Martin was listed as the No. 3 power forward and the No. 11 player in the nation in 2013.

== College career ==
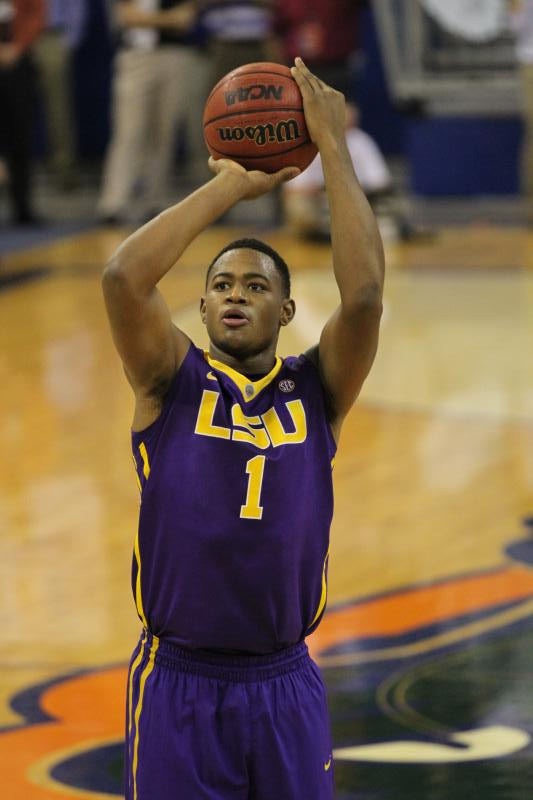
Martin shoots a free throw with the LSU Tigers in 2015

=== Freshman season ===
Martin started 25 of LSU's 34 games and averaged 10.3 points, 4.6 rebounds and 26.2 minutes per game. He ranked ninth in the SEC among freshmen in scoring, and seventh among SEC freshmen in rebounding. He averaged 11.4 points per game in SEC action with 12 of his 18 double figure scoring games coming in SEC play. For his performance, Martin was selected to the SEC All-Freshman Team.

=== Sophomore season ===
As a sophomore, Martin led LSU with 16.9 points per game and increased his rebounding to 9.2 per game. He had a career-high 28 points against Florida on February 21. He had 15 double-doubles and helped lead the Tigers to the NCAA Tournament.

On March 25, 2015, Martin declared for the NBA draft, forgoing his final two years of college eligibility. He was projected as a second-round pick.

== Professional career ==
=== Memphis Grizzlies (2015–2018) ===
On June 25, 2015, Martin was selected with the 25th overall pick in the 2015 NBA draft by the Memphis Grizzlies. Four days later, he revealed that a stress fracture in his foot would prevent him from playing in the Summer League. Despite the injury, he signed his rookie scale contract with the Grizzlies on July 10. Less than two months later, Martin sustained another foot injury, this time fracturing his left foot after colliding with another player during a workout. On December 18, he made his NBA debut in the Grizzlies' 97–88 loss to the Dallas Mavericks. His minutes increased post All-Star break thanks to multiple injured teammates. Having scored eight points total in his NBA career up until March 7, 2016, Martin had 15 of his career-high 16 points in the first half of the Grizzlies' 116–96 loss to the Boston Celtics on March 9. During his rookie season, he had multiple assignments to the Iowa Energy, the Grizzlies' D-League affiliate.

On October 30, 2016, Martin made his first career start, recording four points and five rebounds in 19 minutes in a 112–103 overtime win over the Washington Wizards. On November 28, 2016, he posted his first career double-double with 11 points and 12 rebounds in a 104–85 loss to the Charlotte Hornets. During the 2016–17 season, he had multiple assignments to the Iowa Energy.

In November 2017, Martin had three assignments to the Memphis Hustle. During the 2017–18 campaign, Martin played in 73 games (36 starts) for the Grizzlies, averaging 7.7 points, 4.4 rebounds and 1.0 assists in 22.7 minutes per game. He scored in double figures 23 times, including a career-high 20 points on December 27 against the Los Angeles Lakers. Martin led (or tied) the Grizzlies in scoring once, in rebounding four times and in assists once. He pulled down 10+ rebounds five times, including a career-high 14 boards on March 28 against the Portland Trail Blazers, and recorded two double-doubles.

=== Orlando Magic (2018–2019) ===
On July 23, 2018, Martin and cash considerations were traded to the Orlando Magic in exchange for Dakari Johnson and the draft rights to Tyler Harvey. With the Magic in the 2018–19 season, he played in 42 games (one start) and averaged 2.7 points and 1.7 rebounds in 7.8 minutes per game.

On August 16, 2019, Martin signed with the Cleveland Cavaliers. He was waived by the Cavaliers on October 19, 2019.

=== Shenzhen Aviators (2019–2020) ===
On December 5, 2019, Martin joined the Shenzhen Aviators of the Chinese Basketball Association (CBA) to replace Shabazz Muhammad. On January 14, 2020, he was replaced by Allerik Freeman.

=== Rio Grande Valley Vipers (2020) ===
On February 1, 2020, Martin was acquired by the Rio Grande Valley Vipers of the NBA G League.

=== Sydney Kings (2020–2022) ===
On December 2, 2020, Martin signed a one-season (plus option) contract with the Sydney Kings of the Australian National Basketball League (NBL). He averaged 18 points and seven rebounds per game during the 2020–21 season.

On June 26, 2021, Martin recommitted to the Kings for the 2021–22 NBL season. He helped the Kings win the NBL championship in May 2022.

=== Maccabi Tel Aviv (2022–2023) ===
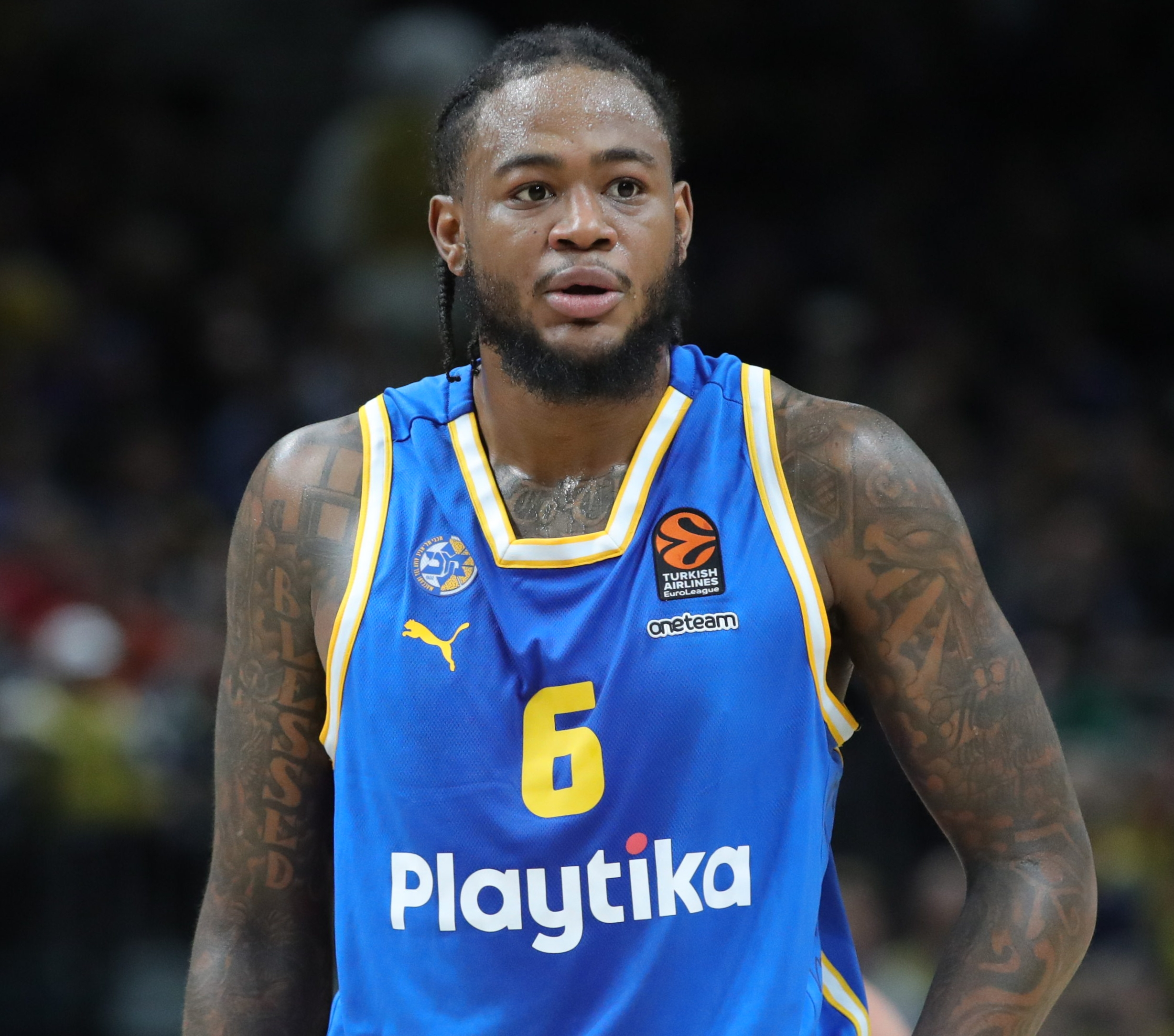
Martin with Maccabi Tel Aviv in 2022

On July 4, 2022, Martin signed a two-year deal with Maccabi Tel Aviv of the Israeli Premier League. In 38 EuroLeague games, he averaged 7.2 points and 3.5 rebounds in 19 minutes per contest. His contract was terminated on July 17, 2023.

=== Galatasaray (2023–2024) ===
On July 20, 2023, Martin signed with Galatasaray Ekmas of the Basketbol Süper Ligi (BSL). In December 2023, he suffered a patellar tendon rupture in his right knee during a round 11 BSL game.

=== Adelaide 36ers (2024–2025) ===
On August 1, 2024, Martin signed with the Adelaide 36ers for the 2024–25 NBL season. Having recovered from his patellar tendon injury, but dealt with a foot complaint during the pre-season that ruled him out until November 2024.

=== Suwon KT Sonicboom (2025) ===
On March 10, 2025, Martin signed with the Suwon KT Sonicboom of the Korean Basketball League, replacing Jordan Morgan. On March 19, the team completed the registration. On March 24, he was ruled out for the remainder of the 2024–25 season after suffering a stress fracture in his toe, and was replaced by Derek Culver.

== Career statistics ==
Legend
GP	Games played	GS	Games started	MPG	Minutes per game
FG%	Field goal percentage	3P%	3-point field goal percentage	FT%	Free throw percentage
RPG	Rebounds per game	APG	Assists per game	SPG	Steals per game
BPG	Blocks per game	PPG	Points per game	**Bold**	Career high

=== NBA ===
==== Regular season ====
Year	Team	GP	GS	MPG	FG%	3P%	FT%	RPG	APG	SPG	BPG	PPG
2015–16	Memphis	27	0	14.1	**.466**	.000	.726	3.2	.6	.3	.3	5.7
2016–17	Memphis	42	3	13.3	.384	**.360**	.800	3.9	.2	.4	.2	3.9
2017–18	Memphis	**73**	**36**	22.8	.446	.347	.767	**4.4**	**1.0**	**.5**	**.7**	**7.7**
2018–19	Orlando	42	1	7.8	.413	.351	**.818**	1.7	.4	.1	.2	2.7
Career		184	40	15.9	.434	.346	.766	3.5	.6	.4	.4	5.4

==== Playoffs ====
Year	Team	GP	GS	MPG	FG%	3P%	FT%	RPG	APG	SPG	BPG	PPG
2016	Memphis	2	0	**23.0**	**.375**	.000	**.500**	**3.5**	**.5**	**1.5**	.0	**4.5**
2017	Memphis	**3**	0	3.3	.333	.000	.000	1.3	.0	.3	.0	0.7
Career		5	0	11.2	.364	.000	.500	2.2	.2	.8	.0	2.2

=== College ===
Year	Team	GP	GS	MPG	FG%	3P%	FT%	RPG	APG	SPG	BPG	PPG
2013–14	LSU	32	25	26.2	.471	**.333**	.689	4.6	.9	.8	**.7**	10.3
2014–15	LSU	**33**	**32**	**35.1**	**.509**	.269	**.690**	**9.2**	**1.8**	**1.2**	**.7**	**16.9**
Career		65	57	30.7	.494	.308	.689	6.9	1.4	1.0	.7	13.7
