= 2021–22 NBL season =

Professional basketball season

- League: National Basketball League
- Season: 2021–22
- Duration: 3 December 2021 – 11 May 2022
- Games played: 140
- Teams: 10
- TV partners: Australia: ESPN; 10 Peach; New Zealand: Sky Sport; Online: NBL TV Kayo Sports 10 Play Sky Sport NOW

Regular season
- Season champions: Melbourne United
- Season MVP: (United States) Jaylen Adams (Sydney)

Finals
- Champions: Sydney Kings (4th title)
- Runners-up: Tasmania JackJumpers
- Semi-finalists: Melbourne United; Illawarra Hawks
- Finals MVP: (United States) Xavier Cooks (Sydney)

Statistical leaders
Points	(United States) Bryce Cotton (Perth)	22.7
Rebounds	(Australia) Xavier Cooks (Sydney)	9.8
Assists	(United States) Jaylen Adams (Sydney)	6.1
Efficiency	(Australia) Akoldah Gak (Illawarra)	78%

Records
- Biggest home win: 42 points United 89–47 Kings (16 December 2021)
- Biggest away win: 33 points Breakers 60–93 Sixers (24 April 2022)
- Highest scoring: 210 points Taipans 112–98 Bullets (23 April 2022)
- Lowest scoring: 128 points JackJumpers 66–62 Breakers (5 March 2022)
- Winning streak: 13 games Sydney Kings (6 February 2022 – 17 April)
- Losing streak: 10 games New Zealand Breakers (14 March 2022 – 24 April)
- Highest attendance: 16,149 – Qudos Bank Arena; Kings vs JackJumpers (11 May 2022)
- Lowest attendance: 1,477 – MyState Bank Arena; Breakers vs JackJumpers (30 January 2022)
- Attendance: 684,715
- Average attendance: 4,998

NBL seasons
- ← 2020–21 2022–23 →
- All statistics correct as of 11 May 2022.

The 2021–22 NBL season was the 44th season of the National Basketball League since its establishment in 1979. A total of ten teams contested the 2021–22 season, which commenced on 3 December 2021.

Australian broadcast rights to the season are held by ESPN in the first season of a new three-year deal. All games are available live on ESPN and the streaming platform Kayo Sports. After signing onto the new three-year deal, Network 10 will broadcast two Sunday afternoon games on 10 Peach and 10 Play. In New Zealand, Sky Sport continue as the official league broadcaster, with Dongqiudi, TAP Sports, M Plus, Astro, Fanseat, Spring Media, Live Now and YouTube broadcasting games internationally.

== Teams ==
=== Stadiums and locations ===
Ten teams are competing in the 2021–22 season, with the Tasmania JackJumpers entering the league for their first season.

Team	Location	Stadium	Capacity
Adelaide 36ers	Adelaide	Adelaide Entertainment Centre	11,300
Brisbane Bullets	Brisbane	Nissan Arena	5,000
Cairns Taipans	Cairns	Cairns Convention Centre	5,300
Illawarra Hawks	Wollongong	WIN Entertainment Centre	6,000
Melbourne United	Melbourne	John Cain Arena	10,500
New Zealand Breakers	Auckland	Spark Arena	9,300
New Zealand Breakers	Hobart	MyState Bank Arena	4,865
New Zealand Breakers	Bendigo	Bendigo Stadium	4,000
Perth Wildcats	Perth	RAC Arena	14,800
S.E. Melbourne Phoenix	Melbourne	John Cain Arena	10,500
S.E. Melbourne Phoenix	Melbourne	State Basketball Centre	3,200
Sydney Kings	Sydney	Qudos Bank Arena	18,200
Tasmania JackJumpers	Hobart	MyState Bank Arena	4,865
Tasmania JackJumpers	Launceston	Silverdome	3,255

=== Personnel and sponsorship ===
Team	Coach	Captain	Main sponsor	Kit manufacturer
Adelaide 36ers	(Australia) C. J. Bruton	(Australia) Mitch McCarron	Walker Corporation	Champion
Brisbane Bullets	(Canada) James Duncan	(Australia) Jason Cadee	St. Genevieve	Champion
Cairns Taipans	(Australia) Adam Forde	(Brazil) Scott Machado	CQUniversity	Champion
Illawarra Hawks	(United States) Brian Goorjian	(Australia) Andrew Ogilvy	Pepper Money	Champion
Melbourne United	(Australia) Dean Vickerman	(Australia) Chris Goulding	SodaStream	Champion
New Zealand Breakers	(Israel) Dan Shamir	(New Zealand) Thomas Abercrombie	Sky Sport	Champion
Perth Wildcats	(Canada) Scott Morrison	(Australia) Jesse Wagstaff	Pentanet	Champion
South East Melbourne Phoenix	(Australia) Simon Mitchell	(Australia) Kyle Adnam	Mountain Goat Beer	Champion
Sydney Kings	(United States) Chase Buford	(Australia) Shaun Bruce (Australia) Xavier Cooks	Brydens Lawyers	Champion
Tasmania JackJumpers	(United States) Scott Roth	(Australia) Clint Steindl	Spirit of Tasmania	Champion

=== Player transactions ===
Free agency negotiations were delayed until 28 June 2021, due to the late finish of the 2020–21 season which had been delayed due to COVID-19 pandemic.

=== Coaching transactions ===
Team	Role	2020–21 season	2021–22 season
Adelaide 36ers	Head coach	Conner Henry	C. J. Bruton
Brisbane Bullets	Head coach	Andrej Lemanis	James Duncan
Brisbane Bullets	Assistant coach	C. J. Bruton	Peter Crawford
Cairns Taipans	Head coach	Mike Kelly	Adam Forde
Cairns Taipans	Assistant coach	Jamie O'Loughlin	Sam Gruggen
Cairns Taipans	Assistant coach	Brad Hill	Kerry Williams
New Zealand Breakers	Assistant coach	Rashid Al-Kaleem	N/A
Sydney Kings	Head coach	Adam Forde	Chase Buford
Sydney Kings	Assistant coach	James Duncan	Fleur McIntyre
Sydney Kings	Assistant coach	Sam Gruggen	N/A
Perth Wildcats	Head coach	Trevor Gleeson	Scott Morrison
Perth Wildcats	Assistant coach	Bob Thornton	Keegan Crawford
Perth Wildcats	Assistant coach	Jacob Chance	N/A
Tasmania JackJumpers	Head coach	N/A	Scott Roth
Tasmania JackJumpers	Assistant coach	N/A	Jacob Chance
Tasmania JackJumpers	Assistant coach	N/A	Mark Radford
Tasmania JackJumpers	Assistant coach	N/A	Jack Fleming

== Pre-season ==
The pre-season consisted of warm-up games leading up to the start of the regular season, with the NBL Blitz tournament running during this period. The NBL Blitz ran from 13 to 28 November with all ten teams competing, and was hosted throughout Tasmania, Victoria and New South Wales.

=== Ladder ===
2021–22 NBL pre-season ladder
Ladder
Information

Pos.	Nat.	Name	Pld.	W.	L.	Last 5	Streak	Home	Away	For	Against	Pts %	Win %
1	(Australia)	Illawarra	2	2	0	2–0	W2	0–0	2–0	213	202	105.45%	100.00%
2	(Australia)	Adelaide	5	5	0	5–0	W5	2–0	3–0	401	383	104.70%	100.00%
3	(Australia)	Brisbane	4	3	1	3–1	L1	1–1	2–0	350	327	107.03%	75.00%
4	(New Zealand)	New Zealand	3	2	1	2–1	W2	2–0	0–1	273	273	100.00%	66.67%
5	(Australia)	S.E. Melbourne	4	2	2	2–2	W1	1–0	1–2	376	375	100.27%	50.00%
6	(Australia)	Perth	5	2	3	2–3	L1	2–1	0–2	433	415	104.34%	40.00%
7	(Australia)	Tasmania (NT)	5	2	3	2–3	W1	1–1	1–2	391	403	97.02%	40.00%
8	(Australia)	Sydney	3	1	2	1–2	L1	1–1	0–1	248	253	98.02%	33.33%
9	(Australia)	Melbourne (RC)	4	1	3	1–3	L3	1–1	0–2	342	350	97.71%	25.00%
10	(Australia)	Cairns	5	0	5	0–5	L5	0–3	0–2	394	447	88.14%	0.00%

Total Rounds
2 weeks

Total Games
21 games

Legend
- (NT) New Team
- (RC) Reigning Champion

- Updated: 28 November 2021

==== NBL Blitz ladder ====
2021 NBL Blitz ladder
Ladder
Information

Pos.	Nat.	Name	Pld.	W.	L.	QW	Last 5	Streak	For	Against	Pts %	Win %	Pts.
1	(Australia)	Adelaide	4	4	0	9.5	4–0	W4	308	290	106.21%	100.00%	21.5
2	(Australia)	Brisbane (RC)	4	3	1	10.5	3–1	L1	350	327	107.03%	75.00%	19.5
3	(Australia)	Illawarra^{†}	2	2	0	6	2–0	W2	213	202	105.45%	100.00%	19
4	(Australia)	Perth	4	2	2	9	2–2	W2	340	318	106.92%	50.00%	15
5	(New Zealand)	New Zealand^{†}	3	2	1	5.5	2–1	W2	273	273	100.00%	66.67%	15
6	(Australia)	S.E. Melbourne	4	2	2	7.5	2–2	W1	376	375	100.27%	50.00%	13.5
7	(Australia)	Sydney^{†}	3	1	2	6	1–2	L1	248	253	98.02%	33.33%	12.5
8	(Australia)	Melbourne	4	1	3	7	1–3	L3	342	350	97.71%	25.00%	10
9	(Australia)	Tasmania (NT)	4	1	3	6	1–3	L2	308	335	91.94%	25.00%	9
10	(Australia)	Cairns	4	0	4	5	0–4	L4	326	362	90.06%	0.00%	5
^{†} Multiple games were cancelled due to NBL COVID-19 protocols. Teams were awarded 3.5 points per effected game.

Total Rounds
2 weeks

Total Games
19 games

Legend
- (NT) New Team
- (RC) Reigning Champion

- Updated: 28 November 2021

== Regular season ==
The regular season began on 3 December 2021. It consisted of 140 games spread across 21 rounds, with the final game being played on 24 April 2022.

On 24 April 2022, Melbourne United claimed their 6th regular season championship.

=== Ladder ===
Pos	2021–22 NBL season											
Pos	Team	Pld	W	L	PCT	Last 5	Streak	Home	Away	PF	PA	PP
1	Melbourne United	28	20	8	71.43%	4–1	L1	9–5	11–3	2455	2244	109.40%
2	Illawarra Hawks	28	19	9	67.86%	4–1	W2	8–6	11–3	2498	2345	106.52%
3	Sydney Kings	28	19	9	67.86%	3–2	L1	9–5	10–4	2397	2313	103.63%
4	Tasmania JackJumpers	28	17	11	60.71%	4–1	W4	8–6	9–5	2230	2220	100.45%
5	Perth Wildcats	28	16	12	57.14%	2–3	L2	7–7	9–5	2495	2377	104.96%
6	S.E. Melbourne Phoenix	28	15	13	53.57%	3–2	W2	7–7	8–6	2456	2424	101.32%
7	Adelaide 36ers	28	10	18	35.71%	3–2	W1	6–8	4–10	2283	2346	97.31%
8	Brisbane Bullets	28	10	18	35.71%	2–3	L2	6–8	4–10	2379	2500	95.16%
9	Cairns Taipans	28	9	19	32.14%	1–4	W1	5–9	4–10	2228	2408	92.52%
10	New Zealand Breakers	28	5	23	17.86%	0–5	L10	2–12	3–11	2234	2478	90.15%

Updated to match(es) played on 24 April 2022. Source: NBL.com.au

The NBL tie-breaker system as outlined in the NBL Rules and Regulations states that in the case of an identical win–loss record, the overall points percentage will determine order of seeding.

=== Ladder progression ===
- Numbers highlighted in green indicate that the team finished the round inside the top four.
- Numbers highlighted in blue indicates the team finished first on the ladder in that round.
- Numbers highlighted in red indicates the team finished last place on the ladder in that round.

2021–22 NBL season
Team	1	2	3	4	5	6	7	8	9	10	11	12	13	14	15	16	17	18	19	20	21
Adelaide 36ers	8	6	8	8	8	8	7	8	8	8	8	7	8	8	8	8	8	9	9	8	7
Brisbane Bullets	7	5	7	6	6	7	6	5	7	9	7	8	7	7	7	7	7	7	7	7	8
Cairns Taipans	9	7	4	4	5	5	5	6	9	7	9	10	9	9	10	9	9	8	8	9	9
Illawarra Hawks	3	2	3	3	3	3	3	4	4	5	4	5	4	4	5	4	4	3	3	3	2
Melbourne United	6	9	6	5	4	4	1	1	2	3	1	1	1	1	1	1	1	1	1	1	1
New Zealand Breakers	10	10	10	10	10	10	10	10	10	10	10	9	10	10	9	10	10	10	10	10	10
Perth Wildcats	2	3	1	1	1	1	2	2	3	1	2	3	3	3	2	2	3	4	4	4	5
S.E. Melbourne Phoenix	1	1	2	2	2	2	4	3	1	2	3	2	2	2	4	5	5	6	6	6	6
Sydney Kings	5	4	5	7	7	6	8	7	5	6	5	4	5	5	3	3	2	2	2	2	3
Tasmania JackJumpers	4	8	9	9	9	9	9	9	6	4	6	6	6	6	6	6	6	5	5	5	4

== Finals ==
The 2022 NBL Finals were played in April and May 2022, consisting of two best-of-three semi-final series and a best-of-five Grand Final series. In the semi-finals, the higher seed hosted the first and third games. In the Grand Final, the higher seed hosts the first, third and fifth games.

=== Playoff bracket ===
Semifinals
1	Melbourne United	74	72	73
4	Tasmania JackJumpers	63	79	76
2	Illawarra Hawks	79	87	X
3	Sydney Kings	89	99	X

Grand Final
3	Sydney Kings	95	90	97	X	X
4	Tasmania JackJumpers	78	86	88	X	X

== Awards ==
=== Pre-season ===
- Loggins-Bruton Cup: Adelaide 36ers
- Most Valuable Player (Ray Borner Medal): Mitch McCarron (Adelaide 36ers)

=== Regular season ===
==== Awards Night ====
- Most Valuable Player (Andrew Gaze Trophy): Jaylen Adams (Sydney Kings)
- Rookie of the Year: Bul Kuol (Cairns Taipans)
- Best Defensive Player (Damian Martin Trophy): Antonius Cleveland (Illawarra Hawks)
- Best Sixth Man: Shea Ili (Melbourne United)
- Most Improved Player: Keanu Pinder (Cairns Taipans)
- Fans MVP: Kai Sotto (Adelaide 36ers)
- Coach of the Year (Lindsay Gaze Trophy): Scott Roth (Tasmania JackJumpers)
- Executive of the Year: Simon Edwards (New Zealand Breakers)
- Referee of the Year: Vaughan Mayberry
- GameTime by Kmart: Jack McVeigh (Tasmania JackJumpers)
- All-NBL First Team:
  - Bryce Cotton (Perth Wildcats)
  - Jaylen Adams (Sydney Kings)
  - Antonius Cleveland (Illawarra Hawks)
  - Vic Law (Perth Wildcats)
  - Jo Lual-Acuil (Melbourne United)
- All-NBL Second Team:
  - Matthew Dellavedova (Melbourne United)
  - Josh Adams (Tasmania JackJumpers)
  - Chris Goulding (Melbourne United)
  - Mitch Creek (S.E. Melbourne Phoenix)
  - Xavier Cooks (Sydney Kings)

=== Post Season ===
- Grand Final Series MVP (Larry Sengstock Medal): Xavier Cooks (Sydney Kings)
- NBL Champions: Sydney Kings
