= James Duncan (basketball) =

Canadian basketball player and coach

Shenzhen Leopards
- Position: assistant coach
- League: CBA

Personal information
- Born: June 15, 1977 (age 49) Burlington, Ontario, Canada
- Listed height: 188 cm (6 ft 2 in)

Career information
- College: Brock (1998–2001)
- Playing career: 2002–2005
- Coaching career: 2005–present

Career history

Playing
- 2002–2004: Artland Dragons
- 2004–2005: Düsseldorf Magics

Coaching
- 2005–2007: Artland Dragons (assistant)
- 2006–2007: →U18 Quakenbrück
- 2006–2007: →Youth Dragons
- 2007–2008: Bree B.B.C. (assistant)
- 2008–2010: Artland Dragons (assistant)
- 2011–2014: Brose Bamberg (assistant)
- 2011–2013: →TSV Tröster Breitengüßbach
- 2014: Rizing Fukuoka
- 2015–2016: Kinmen Kaoliang Liquor (assistant)
- 2016–2018: Toyota Antelopes (assistant)
- 2018–2019: Toyama Grouses (assistant)
- 2019–2021: Sydney Kings (assistant)
- 2021–2022: Brisbane Bullets
- 2024: Shanghai Sharks (assistant)
- 2024: Shanghai Sharks (interim)
- 2024–2026: Shanghai Sharks (assistant)
- 2026–present: Shenzhen Leopards (assistant)

Career highlights
- As assistant coach: CBA champion (2026); 2× CBA Club Cup champion (2025, 2026)

James-Earl Duncan (born June 15, 1977) is a Canadian basketball coach and former player. He served as head coach of the Brisbane Bullets in the National Basketball League (NBL) between June 2021 and November 2022.

In June 2024, Duncan was hired as assistant coach of the Shanghai Sharks. In October 2024, Duncan became head coach of the Shanghai Sharks. In November 2024, Duncan became assistant coach of the Shanghai Sharks.

== Head coaching record ==
Legend
Regular season	G	Games coached	W	Games won	L	Games lost	W–L %	Win–loss %
Playoffs	PG	Playoff games	PW	Playoff wins	PL	Playoff losses	PW–L %	Playoff win–loss %

Team	Year	G	W	L	W–L%	Finish	PG	PW	PL	PW–L%	Result
Rizing Fukuoka	2014	24	15	9	.625	5th in Western	3	1	2	.333	Lost in 1st round
Rizing Fukuoka	2014	22	6	16	.273	Fired	-	-	-	–	-
