= Scott Roth =

American basketball player and coach (born 1963)

Tasmania JackJumpers
- Title: Head coach
- League: NBL

Personal information
- Born: June 3, 1963 (age 63) Cleveland, Ohio, U.S.
- Listed height: 6 ft 8 in (2.03 m)
- Listed weight: 212 lb (96 kg)

Career information
- High school: Brecksville-Broadview Heights (Brecksville, Ohio)
- College: Wisconsin (1981–1985)
- NBA draft: 1985: 4th round, 82nd overall pick
- Drafted by: San Antonio Spurs
- Playing career: 1985–1994
- Position: Small forward
- Number: 33, 3
- Coaching career: 1995–present

Career history

Playing
- 1985–1987: Efes Pilsen
- 1987–1988: Albany Patroons
- 1988: Utah Jazz
- 1989: San Antonio Spurs
- 1989–1990: Minnesota Timberwolves
- 1990–1991: Tau Cerámica
- 1991–1992: Panathinaikos
- 1992–1993: Llíria
- 1993–1994: Muratpaşa Belediyespor

Coaching
- 1995–1996: Wisconsin–Platteville (assistant)
- 1996–2000: Dallas Mavericks (assistant)
- 2000–2002: Vancouver / Memphis Grizzlies (assistant)
- 2008–2009: Bakersfield Jam
- 2009–2010: Golden State Warriors (assistant)
- 2010–2013: Toronto Raptors (assistant)
- 2014: Detroit Pistons (assistant)
- 2014–2015: Baloncesto Sevilla
- 2017–2019: Iowa Wolves
- 2019–2021: Perth Wildcats (assistant)
- 2021–present: Tasmania JackJumpers

Career highlights
- As head coach: NBL champion (2024); NBL Coach of the Year (2022); As assistant coach: NBL champion (2020)
- Stats at NBA.com
- Stats at Basketball Reference

Scott Edward Roth (born June 3, 1963) is an American professional basketball coach and former player who is the head coach of the Tasmania JackJumpers of the Australian National Basketball League (NBL).

== Early life ==
Roth was born in Cleveland, Ohio, and attended Brecksville-Broadview Heights High School in Brecksville, Ohio.

== College career ==
Roth played four years of college basketball for the Wisconsin Badgers between 1981 and 1985, averaging more than 18 points per game in his senior season. He was a three-year starter and two-time All-Big Ten selection.

== Professional career ==
Roth was selected in the fourth round of the 1985 NBA draft by the San Antonio Spurs. He played his first two professional seasons in Turkey with Efes Pilsen before returning to the United States and playing the 1987–88 CBA season with the Albany Patroons.

On February 25, 1988, Roth signed with the Utah Jazz. He was waived by the Jazz on December 12, 1988. In 42 games for the Jazz across the 1987–88 NBA season and 1988–89 NBA season, he averaged 2.5 points in 6.5 minutes per game.

In January 1989, Roth signed with the San Antonio Spurs. In 47 games to finish the 1988–89 season, he averaged 3.4 points, 1.2 rebounds and 1.0 assists in 9.9 minutes per game.

In June 1989, Roth was acquired by the Minnesota Timberwolves in an expansion draft. On January 6, 1990, he scored a career-high 24 points against the Spurs. In 71 games for the Timberwolves in the 1989–90 NBA season, he averaged 6.8 points, 1.6 rebounds and 1.6 assists in 14.9 minutes per game.

Roth's final four professional seasons were spent in Spain with Tau Cerámica (1990–91), in Greece with Panathinaikos (1991–92), in Spain again with Llíria (1992–93), and in Turkey again with Muratpaşa Belediyespor (1993–94).

== Coaching career ==
Roth began his coaching career at the University of Wisconsin–Platteville, where he served as an assistant coach during the 1995–96 season under Bo Ryan.

Roth served six seasons in the NBA as an assistant coach with the Dallas Mavericks (1996–2000) and Vancouver/Memphis Grizzlies (2000–02), and four seasons as a scout and advisor for the Milwaukee Bucks.

In January 2008, Roth resigned as scout of the Bucks and took over as head coach of the Bakersfield Jam in the NBA D-League for the rest of the 2007–08 season. He returned to the Jam for the 2008–09 season and guided the team to their first playoff appearance. After being sacked by the Jam, he coached the NBA D-League Select Team during the 2009 NBA Summer League.

After a season as an assistant with the Golden State Warriors in 2009–10, Roth served as assistant with the Toronto Raptors between 2010 and 2013.

In February 2014, Roth was hired by the Detroit Pistons to be assistant coach for the remainder of the 2013–14 season.

On July 29, 2014, Roth was appointed head coach of Spanish club Baloncesto Sevilla. However, he was not granted a coaching license and therefore was not allowed to act as head coach during Liga ACB games. Roth ran practices and coached the team in its Eurocup games, where Spanish league rules did not apply. His assistant, Audie Norris, was officially coach of the team for Spanish league games. The team started 0–5 and the situation became untenable, which led to Roth's contract being terminated on January 22, 2015.

After serving as a scout for the Minnesota Timberwolves in the 2016–17 NBA season, Roth served as the head coach of the Iowa Wolves in the NBA G League between 2017 and 2019.

Between October 2019 and February 2021, Roth served as lead assistant coach of the Perth Wildcats in the Australian National Basketball League (NBL) under head coach Trevor Gleeson. He helped guide the Wildcats to the NBL championship in the 2019–20 season.

Roth served as the inaugural head coach of the Tasmania JackJumpers in the 2021–22 NBL season, winning the NBL Coach of the Year and guiding the JackJumpers to the NBL Grand Final. In May 2022, Roth re-signed with the JackJumpers for three more seasons. In January 2024, he re-signed with the JackJumpers until the end of the 2026–27 season. He helped the team reach the 2024 NBL Grand Final series, where they defeated Melbourne United 3–2 to win the championship.

== National team career ==
In 2001 and 2002, Roth was an assistant coach with the Turkish national team. The team won silver at EuroBasket 2001 in Turkey and competed at the 2002 FIBA World Championship in Indianapolis. In 2007 and 2008, he served as the head coach of the Dominican Republic national team, earning a silver medal at the 2007 CBC Caribbean Championships in Puerto Rico.

In 2019, Roth served as assistant coach with the Chinese national team.

== Personal life ==
Roth and his wife Lorie have a daughter, Dene. Roth graduated from Cleveland State University with a degree in communications in 1995.

== Career playing statistics ==
Legend
| GP | Games played | GS | Games started | MPG | Minutes per game |
| FG% | Field goal percentage | 3P% | 3-point field goal percentage | FT% | Free throw percentage |
| RPG | Rebounds per game | APG | Assists per game | SPG | Steals per game |
| BPG | Blocks per game | PPG | Points per game | **Bold** | Career high |

=== NBA ===
==== Regular season ====
| Year | Team | GP | GS | MPG | FG% | 3P% | FT% | RPG | APG | SPG | BPG | PPG |
|---|---|---|---|---|---|---|---|---|---|---|---|---|
| 1987–88 | Utah | 26 | 0 | **7.7** | **.405** | .182 | .733 | 1.1 | .6 | .5 | .0 | 3.2 |
| 1988–89 | Utah | 16 | 0 | 4.5 | .292 | .167 | .727 | .5 | .4 | .3 | **.1** | 1.4 |
| 1988–89 | San Antonio | 47 | **3** | 9.9 | .364 | .200 | .684 | 1.2 | 1.0 | .4 | **.1** | 3.4 |
| 1989–90 | Minnesota | **71** | **3** | **14.9** | .379 | **.346** | **.746** | **1.6** | **1.6** | **.7** | **.1** | **6.8** |
| Career | | 160 | 6 | 11.2 | .375 | .291 | .730 | 1.3 | 1.2 | .5 | .1 | 4.7 |

==== Playoffs ====
| Year | Team | GP | GS | MPG | FG% | 3P% | FT% | RPG | APG | SPG | BPG | PPG |
|---|---|---|---|---|---|---|---|---|---|---|---|---|
| 1988 | Utah | 6 | 0 | 1.7 | .333 | – | – | .0 | .0 | .3 | .0 | .3 |
