= Jack McVeigh =

Australian basketball player (born 1996)

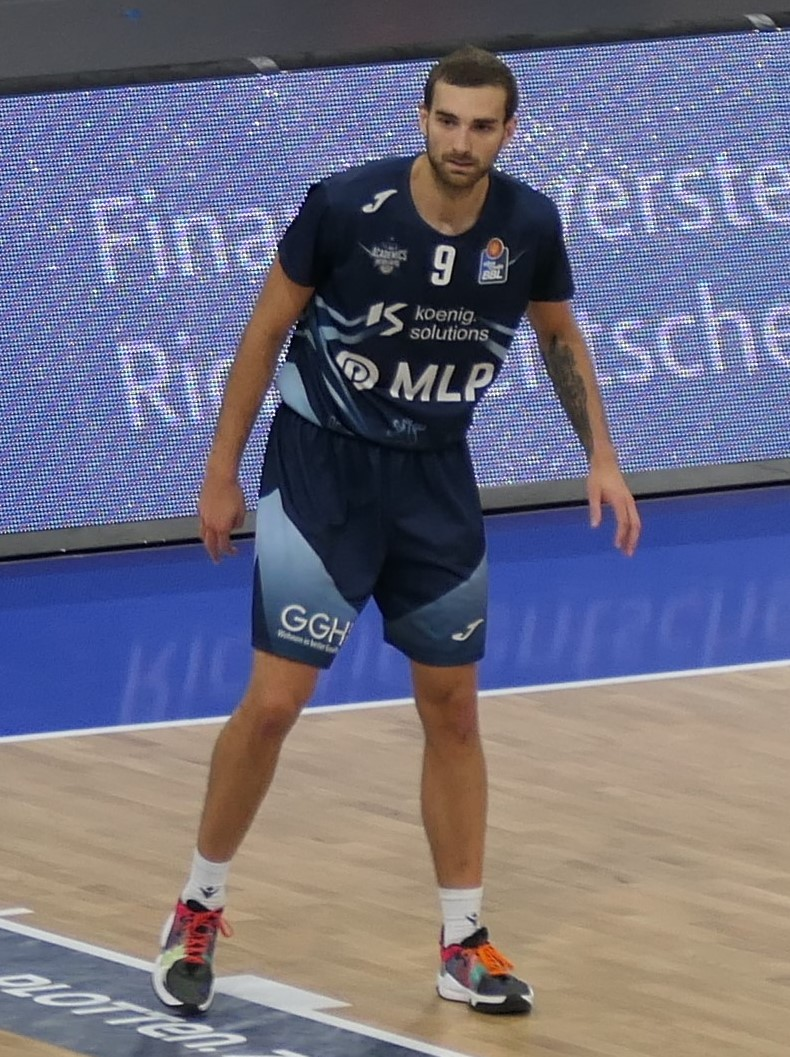
- McVeigh with Heidelberg in 2023

No. 9 – Cairns Taipans
- Position: Power forward
- League: NBL

Personal information
- Born: 27 June 1996 (age 30) Murwillumbah, New South Wales, Australia
- Listed height: 2.03 m (6 ft 8 in)
- Listed weight: 93 kg (205 lb)

Career information
- High school: The Southport School (Gold Coast, Queensland); Lake Ginninderra (Canberra, ACT)
- College: Nebraska (2015–2018)
- NBA draft: 2019: undrafted
- Playing career: 2014–present

Career history
- 2014–2015: BA Centre of Excellence
- 2018: Gold Coast Rollers
- 2018–2021: Adelaide 36ers
- 2019; 2021: North Adelaide Rockets
- 2021–2024: Tasmania JackJumpers
- 2022: North Gold Coast Seahawks
- 2023: MLP Academics Heidelberg
- 2024–2025: Houston Rockets
- 2024–2025: →Rio Grande Valley Vipers
- 2025–present: Cairns Taipans
- 2026: Capitanes de Arecibo

Career highlights
- NBL champion (2024); NBL Championship Series MVP (2024); 2× All-NBL Second Team (2024, 2026); NBL1 Central champion (2021); NBL1 Central scoring champion (2021)
- Stats at NBA.com
- Stats at Basketball Reference
Medals
Men's basketball
Representing Australia
FIBA Asia Cup
Gold medal – first place	2025 Saudi Arabia

Jack Edward McVeigh (born 27 June 1996) is an Australian professional basketball player for the Cairns Taipans of the National Basketball League (NBL). He played college basketball for the Nebraska Cornhuskers from 2015 to 2018. McVeigh played for the Australian national team at the 2024 Summer Olympics.

McVeigh started his professional career with the Adelaide 36ers of the NBL in 2018 and spent three seasons with the team. He joined the Tasmania JackJumpers for their inaugural season in 2021 and led them to an NBL championship in 2024, earning the NBL Championship Series Most Valuable Player Award. During the 2024–25 season, he played for the Houston Rockets in the National Basketball Association (NBA).

== Early life and career ==
McVeigh was born in Murwillumbah, New South Wales. He grew up in nearby Cabarita Beach before moving to Gold Coast for boarding school. He attended The Southport School and played for the North Gold Coast Seahawks. He graduated from Lake Ginninderra College in Canberra in 2014.

In 2014 and 2015, McVeigh played for the BA Centre of Excellence in the South East Australian Basketball League.

== College career ==
McVeigh played college basketball with the Nebraska Cornhuskers between 2015 and 2018. He emerged as the team's sixth man during his sophomore season but a reduction in playing time during his junior season led to his departure from the team. In 78 games over three seasons, he made 15 starts and averaged 5.3 points and 2.3 rebounds in 17.6 minutes per game.

== Professional career ==
=== NBL, state leagues and Germany (2018–2024) ===
After leaving college, McVeigh returned to his hometown to play for the Gold Coast Rollers in the 2018 Queensland Basketball League season. He subsequently joined the Adelaide 36ers of the National Basketball League on a three-year deal. He averaged 3.4 points and 1.8 rebounds with the 36ers in 2018–19. He then played for the North Adelaide Rockets in the 2019 Premier League season. He averaged 6.0 points in 2019–20 and 9.4 points in 2020–21. He re-joined the North Adelaide Rockets, now in the NBL1 Central, for the 2021 NBL1 season, helping them win the NBL1 Central championship.

McVeigh joined the inaugural squad of the Tasmania JackJumpers, a team entering the NBL for the first time in 2021–22. He helped the JackJumpers reach the 2022 NBL Grand Final series, where they lost 3–0 to the Sydney Kings.

After playing for the North Gold Coast Seahawks of the NBL1 North in the 2022 NBL1 season, McVeigh re-joined the JackJumpers for the 2022–23 NBL season. Following the NBL season, he joined USC Heidelberg of the Basketball Bundesliga for the end of the 2022–23 BBL season.

In the 2023–24 NBL season, the JackJumpers reached the NBL Championship Series with a 2–1 victory over the Perth Wildcats in the semi-finals, with McVeigh scoring a game-high and career-high 27 points in game three. The JackJumpers went on to win the NBL championship with a 3–2 Championship Series victory over Melbourne United. McVeigh was named Championship Series MVP. He was named the JackJumpers Club MVP after finishing with season averages of 17.3 points and 5.9 rebounds per game.

On 12 April 2024, McVeigh extended his contract with the JackJumpers until the end of the 2026–27 season.

=== Houston Rockets (2024–2025) ===
On 25 July 2024, McVeigh signed a two-way contract with the Houston Rockets of the National Basketball Association (NBA) and the Rio Grande Valley Vipers of the NBA G League. He became the first NBA player to wear the jersey number 58 which is the sum of the four jersey numbers he wore during his collegiate, NBL and international careers. McVeigh made his debut for the Rockets in a game against the San Antonio Spurs on 6 November and scored his first points with a three-pointer against the Oklahoma City Thunder two days later. On 9 January 2025, he scored a career-high 29 points in the Vipers' 130–118 win over the Oklahoma City Blue. McVeigh played in nine NBA games but spent most of the 2024–25 season with the Vipers where he averaged 15.7 points, 4.6 rebounds and 1.6 assists per game across 37 G League appearances.

McVeigh joined the Atlanta Hawks for the 2025 NBA Summer League.

On 3 August 2025, the JackJumpers released McVeigh from the remainder of his contract.

=== Cairns Taipans (2025–present) ===
On 5 August 2025, McVeigh signed with the Cairns Taipans of the NBL on a two-year deal, with the second year being a mutual option. On 16 October, he was sidelined with a wrist injury. On 16 November, McVeigh scored a career-high 39 points in a 105–101 overtime loss to the Adelaide 36ers. Six days later, he had his second straight 30-point game, finishing with 35 points in a 102–96 loss to the New Zealand Breakers. On 19 December, he set a new career high with 47 points in a 99–95 win over the Breakers. On 22 January 2026, he scored 34 points with eight 3-pointers in a 106–69 loss to the Perth Wildcats. On 30 January, he scored 40 points in a 96–93 overtime win over the Tasmania JackJumpers, playing all 45 minutes. He was named to the All-NBL Second Team.

On 12 February 2026, McVeigh and the Taipans agreed to the mutual option on his contract for the 2026–27 NBL season. He then joined Capitanes de Arecibo of the Baloncesto Superior Nacional for the 2026 season.

On 8 November 2026, McVeigh scored 36 points with eight 3-pointers in a 100–92 win over the Perth Wildcats.

== National team career ==
In July 2024, McVeigh was named in the Australian Boomers' final squad for the Paris Olympics.

In July 2025, McVeigh was named in the Boomers squad in the lead up to the 2025 FIBA Asia Cup in Saudi Arabia.

In June 2026, McVeigh was named in the Boomers squad for the next window of the FIBA Basketball World Cup 2027 Asian Qualifiers in Perth in July.

== Career statistics ==
Legend
GP	Games played	GS	Games started	MPG	Minutes per game
FG%	Field goal percentage	3P%	3-point field goal percentage	FT%	Free throw percentage
RPG	Rebounds per game	APG	Assists per game	SPG	Steals per game
BPG	Blocks per game	PPG	Points per game	**Bold**	Career high

=== NBA ===
Year	Team	GP	GS	MPG	FG%	3P%	FT%	RPG	APG	SPG	BPG	PPG
2024–25	Houston	9	0	4.8	.294	.308	.000	.6	.1	.0	.2	1.6
Career		9	0	4.8	.294	.308	.000	.6	.1	.0	.2	1.6

=== College ===
Year	Team	GP	GS	MPG	FG%	3P%	FT%	RPG	APG	SPG	BPG	PPG
2015–16	Nebraska	**34**	4	17.0	.350	**.340**	.690	**2.6**	**1.0**	.4	.1	4.8
2016–17	Nebraska	30	**11**	**22.9**	**.372**	.338	.780	2.5	.6	**.5**	**.3**	**7.5**
2017–18	Nebraska	14	0	7.5	.345	.333	**1.000**	1.1	.1	.4	.1	1.9
Career		78	15	17.6	.361	.339	.746	2.3	.7	.4	.2	5.3

== Personal life ==
McVeigh married his partner, Beth, in June 2024. He missed his honeymoon to attend the Australian basketball selection camp for the 2024 Paris Olympics. McVeigh's first child was born in December 2025.

McVeigh's younger brother, Lloyd, played college basketball for the Buffalo Bulls. Lloyd joined the Cairns Taipans in 2025 and continued with the club in 2026.
