= ESPN Australia =

Australian sports television channel

- Country: Australia
- Broadcast area: Oceania
- Network: ESPN

Programming
- Language: English
- Picture format: 576i (SDTV); 720p (HDTV)

Ownership
- Owner: ESPN, LLC (operated by The Walt Disney Company Australia through ESPN International)

History
- Launched: 19 September 1995; 31 years ago
- Former names: Sports ESPN

Links
- Website: espn.com.au

ESPN Australia is the Australian division of ESPN, part of the ESPN International grouping. It is offered in Australia, New Zealand, Papua New Guinea and the Pacific Islands.

Since 2023, it has been the only Disney-owned network in Oceania along with Baby TV to broadcast as a linear television channel, with the Disney Channel and Disney Junior as well as Nat Geo Wild and National Geographic all having been shut down in favour of the streaming service Disney+.

== History ==
Initially, ESPN was known as Sports ESPN on the Optus Vision cable television system, and focused on sports aired by its home network in the United States, including American football, baseball, and basketball. In order to expand its local reach, it has shown an increasing number of soccer games including FA Cup, World Cup qualifying games and Major League Soccer. Also on the network schedule are rugby matches, among other sports.

It became available on Austar in April 1999, and Foxtel in September 2002.

The broadcast of Jarryd Hayne's debut for the San Francisco 49ers in the National Football League on 15 September 2015 drew the network's highest ever audience with 116,000 viewers watching the game live, beating the previous audience record of 107,100 viewers for Super Bowl XLVIII in 2014.

On March 1, 2011, ESPN2 launched in Australia both in standard and high definition formats.

On 14 February 2017, ESPN was made available in HD for Fetch TV customers.

On 26 March 2025, ESPN was added on ESPN hub on the streaming service Disney+.

== Content ==
ESPN Australia has made locally-produced content, including Australian versions of PTI and SportsCenter. They also air a soccer discussion show Monday to Friday called ESPNsoccernet PressPass which is hosted by Andrew Orsatti.

The following is the list of sports programming shown on ESPN channels (with some being shown only on ESPN and not ESPN2, and vice versa).

=== American Football ===
- National Football League (includes NFL draft, Sunday Night Football, Monday Night Football, Thursday Night Football, three Sunday afternoon games, all NFL Network games, Thanksgiving day, NFL RedZone, Pro Bowl plus all the Playoff games and Super Bowl)
- College football (includes regular season, Heisman Trophy, College Football Playoff and College Football Championship Game)
- United Football League

=== Baseball ===
- Major League Baseball (includes Sunday, Monday, Tuesday, Wednesday, Thursday, Friday and Saturday Night Baseball, MLB Strike Zone, Home Run Derby, All-Star Game, all playoff games and World Series)
- World Baseball Classic
- College baseball
- Little League World Series

=== Basketball ===
- National Basketball Association (includes NBA draft, NBA All-Star Weekend, Wednesday and some Friday games (mostly doubleheaders), Saturday games (including all ABC games), ESPN/ABC games on Sundays, all NBC/Peacock games, playoff games and NBA Finals)
- FIBA Basketball World Cup
- FIBA Women's Basketball World Cup
- FIBA Asia Cup
- FIBA Women's Asia Cup
- National Basketball League
- Women's National Basketball League
- Women's National Basketball Association
- College basketball
- NBA Summer League
- NBA G League
- Athletes Unlimited Basketball

=== Cricket ===
- Australia Tour of West Indies (men and women)
- New Zealand Tour of West Indies
- Pakistan Super League

=== Ice Hockey ===
- National Hockey League
- Australian Ice Hockey League

=== Mixed Martial Arts ===
- ONE Championship

=== Multi-Sport Events ===
- Special Olympics World Games

=== Padel ===
- Hexagon Cup

=== Poker ===
- World Series of Poker

=== Professional wrestling ===
- All Elite Wrestling (includes AEW Dynamite and AEW Collision)

=== Soccer ===
- UEFA Women's Champions League
- Eredivisie
- Campeonato Brasileiro Série A
- CONCACAF Gold Cup

=== Tennis ===
- Wimbledon Championships (only in New Zealand)
- U.S. Open (only in New Zealand)
- ATP Finals (only in New Zealand)
- ATP 1000 (only in New Zealand)
- ATP 500 (only in New Zealand)

=== Other programming ===
- NCAA events
- ESPN Films
- World's Strongest Man
- ESPY Award

=== News and talk shows ===
- Around the Horn
- College Gameday
- E:60
- First Take
- Highly Questionable
- Jalen & Jacoby
- Outside the Lines
- Pardon the Interruption Australia
- SportsCenter
- SportsCenter Australia
- The Pat McAfee show

== ESPN HD ==
ESPN HD was one of the first five channels to be available in HD when Foxtel HD+ launched. ESPN HD commenced in June 2008. The SD version of ESPN began broadcasting in widescreen on 25 January 2010. On 2 June 2011 ESPN HD (the HD simulcast) and ESPN3.com launched in New Zealand on Sky.

== ESPN 3D ==
ESPN 3D launched in Australia on 30 July 2010. The channel launched to show 8 hours of the X Games 16 live in 3D. Foxtel 3D launched on 1 November 2010 which shows all of ESPN 3D's content – with ESPN 3D no longer having its own channel. ESPN 3D was shut down on 30 September 2013, citing "limited viewer adoption of 3D services".

== See also ==
- List of sports television channels
- Fox Sports (Australia)
