= Chase Buford =

American basketball coach (born 1988)

Denver Nuggets
- Title: Assistant coach
- League: NBA

Personal information
- Born: October 25, 1988 (age 38) San Antonio, Texas, U.S.
- Listed height: 6 ft 3 in (1.91 m)
- Listed weight: 210 lb (95 kg)

Career information
- High school: Alamo Heights (Alamo Heights, Texas)
- College: Kansas (2007–2010)
- Position: Point guard / shooting guard
- Coaching career: 2017–present

Career history

Coaching
- 2017–2018: Erie Bayhawks (assistant)
- 2018–2019: Delaware Blue Coats (assistant)
- 2019–2021: Wisconsin Herd
- 2021–2023: Sydney Kings
- 2024–2025: Kansas (assistant)
- 2025–present: Denver Nuggets (assistant)

Career highlights
- As player: NCAA champion (2008); As coach: 2× NBL champion (2022, 2023)

Chase Robert Buford (born October 25, 1988) is an American professional basketball coach and former player who currently serves as an assistant coach for the Denver Nuggets of the National Basketball Association (NBA). He played college basketball at Kansas where he was a part of their 2008 NCAA Tournament-winning team. Buford was head coach of the Wisconsin Herd of the NBA G League between 2019 and 2021. Between 2021 and 2023, he coached the Sydney Kings of the Australian National Basketball League (NBL) and won back-to-back championships.

== Coaching career ==
Buford began his basketball career as regional scout with the Atlanta Hawks of the National Basketball Association (NBA) before being promoted to video intern. He went on to be the coordinator of player development for the Chicago Bulls from 2015 to 2017 before becoming an assistant for the Erie Bayhawks, the G League affiliate of the Hawks in 2017. He was named an assistant for the Delaware Blue Coats, the G League affiliate of the Philadelphia 76ers on September 14, 2018.

=== Wisconsin Herd ===
Buford was named the head coach of the Wisconsin Herd, the G League affiliate of the Milwaukee Bucks in 2019. In 2020, Buford led the Herd to a first place finish, though the league season was suspended and ultimately cancelled due to the coronavirus pandemic. In 2021, he made national news when he got suspended for two games for a rant about the officiating during a game in which his team blew a 21-point lead in the fourth quarter. He later issued an apology, saying he was "unprofessional" and "embarrassed".

=== Sydney Kings ===
Buford was hired as the head coach of the Sydney Kings of the NBL on June 25, 2021. He led the Kings to the 2022 and 2023 NBL championships. On May 16, 2023, he parted ways with the Kings.

=== Kansas ===
In June 2024, Buford was announced as an assistant coach for the Kansas Jayhawks.

=== Denver Nuggets ===
On August 15, 2025, it was announced that Buford had accepted an assistant coaching job with the Denver Nuggets, working under head coach David Adelman.

== Personal life ==
Buford's father, R. C., was an assistant coach at Kansas and for the San Antonio Spurs, and is currently the CEO of the Spurs.
