= List of 2021–22 NBL season transactions =

This is a list of transactions that have taken place during the 2021 NBL off-season and the 2021–22 NBL season.

== Retirements ==
Date	Name	Team(s) played (years)	Age	Notes	Ref.
11 June	Daniel Kickert	Melbourne United (2014–2016); Brisbane Bullets (2016–2018); Sydney Kings (2018–2021)	38	All-NBL First Team (2016); All-NBL Second Team (2017)	
27 October	David Andersen	Wollongong Hawks (1998–1999); Melbourne United (2016–2018); Illawarra Hawks (2018–2020); Melbourne United (2020–2021)	41	2 x NBL champion (2018, 2021)	

== Front office movements ==
=== Coaching changes ===
Team	Position	Outgoing Coach			Incoming Coach			Ref.
Team	Position	Departure date	Coach	Reason for Departure	Hire date	Coach	Last coaching position	Ref.
Adelaide 36ers	Head Coach	26 August	Conner Henry	Released from contract	10 September	C. J. Bruton	Brisbane Bullets assistant coach (2016–2021)	
Brisbane Bullets	Head Coach	5 May	Andrej Lemanis	Departing club	11 June	James Duncan	Sydney Kings assistant coach (2019–2021)	
Brisbane Bullets	Assistant Coach	10 September	C. J. Bruton	Departing club	11 October	Peter Crawford	N/A	
Cairns Taipans	Head Coach	31 May	Mike Kelly	Departing club	29 June	Adam Forde	Sydney Kings Head Coach (2020–2021)	
Cairns Taipans	Assistant Coach	28 June	Jamie O'Loughlin	Unknown	5 August	Sam Gruggen	Sydney Kings Assistant Coach (2020–2021)	
Cairns Taipans	Assistant Coach	28 June	Brad Hill	Unknown	18 August	Kerry Williams	Cairns Marlins Head Coach (2020–2021)	
Illawarra Hawks	N/A	No coaching changes						
Melbourne United	N/A	No coaching changes						
New Zealand Breakers	Assistant Coach	28 June	Rashid Al-Kaleem	Unknown	N/A			
Perth Wildcats	Head Coach	12 July	Trevor Gleeson	NBA opportunity	25 August	Scott Morrison	Boston Celtics assistant coach (2017–2021)	
Perth Wildcats	Associate Head Coach	N/A			26 July	Mike Kelly	Cairns Taipans Head Coach (2018–2021)	
Perth Wildcats	Assistant Coach	Unknown	Bob Thornton	Departing club	30 June	Keegan Crawford	Perth Lynx assistant coach (2015–2021)	
Perth Wildcats	Assistant Coach	Unknown	Jacob Chance	Departing club	N/A			
Sydney Kings	Head Coach	15 May	Adam Forde	Mutual agreement	25 June	Chase Buford	Wisconsin Herd Head Coach (2019–2021)	
Sydney Kings	Assistant Coach	11 June	James Duncan	Departing club	15 July	Fleur McIntyre	Basketball WA High Performance Coach (2011–2021)	
Sydney Kings	Assistant Coach	Unknown	Sam Gruggen	Departing club	10 September	Daniel Kickert	N/A	
SEM Phoenix	N/A	No coaching changes						
Tasmania JackJumpers	Head Coach	N/A			7 January	Scott Roth	Perth Wildcats assistant coach (2019–2021)	
Tasmania JackJumpers	Assistant Coach	N/A			27 April	Mark Radford	Basketball Tasmania State Head Coach (2014–2021)	
Tasmania JackJumpers	Assistant Coach	N/A			2 July	Jacob Chance	Perth Wildcats assistant coach (2019–2021)	
Tasmania JackJumpers	Assistant Coach	N/A			2 July	Jack Fleming	Basketball Victoria State Head Coach (2021)	

== Player movements ==
Contracted	Denotes a contracted player
DP	Denotes a player contracted as a Development Player
IRP	Denotes a player contracted as an Injury Replacement Player
Option	Denotes a player option
Option	Denotes a club option
Option	Denotes a mutual option

=== Retained players/Contract extensions ===
Date signed	Player	Team	Contract				Ref.
Date signed	Player	Team	Type	First year	Second year	Third year	Ref.
11 May 2021	(New Zealand) Tyrell Harrison	Brisbane Bullets	Unrestricted	Contracted	Contracted		
18 June 2021	(Australia) Jordan Hunter	Sydney Kings	Unrestricted	Contracted	Contracted	Contracted	
18 June 2021	(Australia) Mitch Creek	South East Melbourne Phoenix	Unrestricted	Contracted			
22 June 2021	(Australia) Kyle Adnam	South East Melbourne Phoenix	Unrestricted	Contracted	Contracted		
23 June 2021	(Denmark) Rasmus Bach	New Zealand Breakers	Unrestricted	Contracted			
24 June 2021	(New Zealand) Izayah Mauriohooho-Le'afa	South East Melbourne Phoenix	Unrestricted	Contracted	Contracted		
25 June 2021	(New Zealand) Jordan Ngatai	Cairns Taipans	Unrestricted	Contracted			
26 June 2021	(United States) Jarell Martin	Sydney Kings	Restricted	Contracted			
26 June 2021	(Australia) William McDowell-White	New Zealand Breakers	Unrestricted	Contracted			
26 June 2021	(Australia) Kouat Noi	Cairns Taipans	Unrestricted	Contracted	Option		
26 June 2021	(Australia) Nathan Jawai	Cairns Taipans	Unrestricted	Contracted			
27 June 2021	(Australia) Mirko Đerić	Cairns Taipans	Unrestricted	Contracted	Contracted	Option	
27 June 2021	(Australia) Majok Deng	Cairns Taipans	Unrestricted	Contracted			
27 June 2021	(New Zealand) Tom Vodanovich	Sydney Kings	Unrestricted	Contracted			
27 June 2021	(New Zealand) Shea Ili	Melbourne United	Unrestricted	Contracted	Contracted		
28 June 2021	(Australia) Ryan Broekhoff	South East Melbourne Phoenix	Unrestricted	Contracted	Contracted		
30 June 2021	(Australia) Xavier Cooks	Sydney Kings	Unrestricted	Contracted			
30 June 2021	(South Sudan) Jo Lual-Acuil	Melbourne United	Unrestricted	Contracted			
1 July 2021	(Australia) Mitch Norton	Perth Wildcats	Unrestricted	Contracted	Contracted	Contracted	
2 July 2021	(Australia) Jason Cadee	Brisbane Bullets	Unrestricted	Contracted	Contracted		
5 July 2021	(Australia) Jesse Wagstaff	Perth Wildcats	Unrestricted	Contracted			
5 July 2021	(Australia) David Barlow	Melbourne United	Unrestricted	Contracted			
6 July 2021	(South Sudan) Majok Majok	Perth Wildcats	Unrestricted	Contracted	Option		
7 July 2021	(Australia) Corey Shervill	Perth Wildcats	Development	DP	Contracted		
9 July 2021	(Australia) Isaac Humphries	Adelaide 36ers	Unrestricted	Contracted			
9 July 2021	(United States) Tyler Harvey	Illawarra Hawks	Restricted	Contracted	Contracted	Contracted	
11 July 2021	(New Zealand) Tai Webster	New Zealand Breakers	Unrestricted	Contracted	Contracted		
13 July 2021	(Australia) Isaac White	Illawarra Hawks	Unrestricted	Contracted			
13 July 2021	(Australia) Majok Deng	Cairns Taipans	Unrestricted	Contracted	Contracted	Contracted	
14 July 2021	(Australia) Lachlan Dent	Illawarra Hawks	Development	DP			
16 July 2021	(Australia) Andrew Ogilvy	Illawarra Hawks	Unrestricted	Contracted			
22 July 2021	(Australia) Jaylin Galloway	Sydney Kings	Development	DP	Contracted	Option	
24 July 2021	(New Zealand) Jarrod Kenny	Cairns Taipans	Unrestricted	Contracted			
29 July 2021	(United States) Lamar Patterson	Brisbane Bullets	Restricted	Contracted			
18 August 2021	(Australia) Kevin White	Perth Wildcats	Unrestricted	Contracted			
1 September 2021	(Australia) Tim Coenraad	Illawarra Hawks	Injury replacement	IRP			
20 October 2021	(Australia) Tristan Forsyth	South East Melbourne Phoenix	Development	DP			
17 November 2021	(Australia) Tim Coenraad	Illawarra Hawks	Unrestricted	Contracted			

=== Released players ===
Date released	Player	Team	Remaining contract length	Ref
18 June 2021	(Australia) Alex Mudronja	Adelaide 36ers	One season	
20 July 2021	(New Zealand) Max Darling	Illawarra Hawks	Two seasons	
20 August 2021	(New Zealand) Corey Webster	New Zealand Breakers	Two seasons	
1 September 2021	(United States) Zach Hankins	South East Melbourne Phoenix	One season	
16 September 2021	(United States) Cameron Oliver	Cairns Taipans	One season	
20 September 2021	(New Zealand) Tai Webster	New Zealand Breakers	Two seasons	
21 September 2021	(United States) Travis Trice	Illawarra Hawks	One season	
30 December 2021	(United States) Devin Thomas	South East Melbourne Phoenix	One season	

=== Free agency ===
Date signed	Player	Team	Contract				Ref.
Date signed	Player	Team	Type	First year	Second year	Third year	Ref.
14 April 2021	(Australia) Sejr Deans	Tasmania JackJumpers	Development	DP			
21 April 2021	(Philippines) Kai Sotto	Adelaide 36ers	Special Restricted	Contracted	Contracted	Option	
27 April 2021	(Australia) Biwali Bayles	Sydney Kings	Unrestricted	Contracted	Contracted	Option	
27 June 2021	(Australia) Zac Triplett	Melbourne United	Development	DP	DP	Option	
30 June 2021	(New Zealand) Sam Timmins	New Zealand Breakers	Development	DP	Option		
1 July 2021	(Australia) Sam McDaniel	Tasmania JackJumpers	Unrestricted	Contracted	Contracted	Option	
2 July 2021	(New Zealand) Yanni Wetzell	New Zealand Breakers	Unrestricted	Contracted	Contracted	Contracted	
5 July 2021	(Australia) Clint Steindl	Tasmania JackJumpers	Unrestricted	Contracted	Contracted		
6 July 2021	(Australia) Jack McVeigh	Tasmania JackJumpers	Unrestricted	Contracted	Contracted		
7 July 2021	(Australia) Jarred Bairstow	Tasmania JackJumpers	Unrestricted	Contracted	Contracted	Contracted	
7 July 2021	(New Zealand) Jack Salt	Brisbane Bullets	Unrestricted	Contracted			
8 July 2021	(Australia) Brad Newley	Melbourne United	Unrestricted	Contracted			
9 July 2021	(Australia) Matthew Dellavedova	Melbourne United	Unrestricted	Contracted	Contracted	Contracted	
9 July 2021	(Australia) Wani Swaka Lo Buluk	Sydney Kings	Injury Replacement	IRP			
10 July 2021	(South Sudan) Deng Deng	Brisbane Bullets	Unrestricted	Contracted			
11 July 2021	(Australia) Will Magnay	Tasmania JackJumpers	Unrestricted	Contracted			
12 July 2021	(United States) Isaiah Moss	Brisbane Bullets	Restricted	Contracted			
13 July 2021	(Australia) Mitch McCarron	Adelaide 36ers	Unrestricted	Contracted	Contracted	Contracted	
14 July 2021	(Australia) Fabijan Krslovic	Tasmania JackJumpers	Unrestricted	Contracted	Contracted		
14 July 2021	(Australia) Jarrad Weeks	Tasmania JackJumpers	Unrestricted	Contracted	Contracted		
19 July 2021	(Australia) Duop Reath	Illawarra Hawks	Unrestricted	Contracted			
19 July 2021	(Australia) Keanu Pinder	Cairns Taipans	Unrestricted	Contracted	Option		
20 July 2021	(United States) Josh Adams	Tasmania JackJumpers	Restricted	Contracted			
20 July 2021	(United States) Dusty Hannahs	Adelaide 36ers	Restricted	Contracted			
20 July 2021	(New Zealand) Dion Prewster	Melbourne United	Unrestricted	Contracted			
21 July 2021	(United States) Travis Trice	Illawarra Hawks	Restricted	Contracted			
22 July 2021	(Australia) Tad Dufelmeier	Adelaide 36ers	Unrestricted	Contracted			
23 July 2021	(United States) R. J. Hunter	Sydney Kings	Restricted	Contracted			
23 July 2021	(Australia) Harry Froling	Illawarra Hawks	Unrestricted	Contracted			
28 July 2021	(Australia) David Okwera	Melbourne United	Development	DP	Contracted		
28 July 2021	(United States) Zach Hankins	South East Melbourne Phoenix	Restricted	Contracted			
28 July 2021	(United States) Josh Magette	Tasmania JackJumpers	Restricted	Contracted			
28 July 2021	(South Sudan) Emmanuel Malou	Adelaide 36ers	Unrestricted	Contracted			
30 July 2021	(Australia) Callum Dalton	Melbourne United	Unrestricted	Contracted			
2 August 2021	(United States) Antonius Cleveland	Illawarra Hawks	Restricted	Contracted			
5 August 2021	(United States) Todd Withers	Adelaide 36ers	Restricted	Contracted			
6 August 2021	(United States) Tahjere McCall	Cairns Taipans	Restricted	Contracted			
6 August 2021	(New Zealand) Taane Samuel	Brisbane Bullets	Development	DP			
12 August 2021	(Canada) MiKyle McIntosh	Tasmania JackJumpers	Restricted	Contracted			
13 August 2021	(New Zealand) Tohi Smith-Milner	South East Melbourne Phoenix	Unrestricted	Contracted	Option		
13 August 2021	(Australia) Bul Kuol	Cairns Taipans	Unrestricted	Contracted	Option		
17 August 2021	(Australia) Matt Kenyon	Tasmania JackJumpers	Unrestricted	Contracted			
17 August 2021	(Australia) Sean Macdonald	Tasmania JackJumpers	Development	DP			
17 August 2021	(Australia) Jock Perry	Tasmania JackJumpers	Development	DP			
22 August 2021	(United States) Peyton Siva	New Zealand Breakers	Restricted	Contracted			
22 August 2021	(United States) Peyton Siva	Sydney Kings	Restricted	Contracted			
25 August 2021	(Nigeria) Caleb Agada	Melbourne United	Restricted	Contracted			
27 August 2021	(South Sudan) Matur Maker	Sydney Kings	Unrestricted	Contracted			
27 August 2021	(United States) Vic Law	Perth Wildcats	Restricted	Contracted			
28 August 2021	(United States) Robert Franks	Brisbane Bullets	Restricted	Contracted			
1 September 2021	(United States) Xavier Munford	South East Melbourne Phoenix	Restricted	Contracted			
6 September 2021	(Australia) Kyle Zunic	Perth Wildcats	Development	DP	DP		
7 September 2021	(China) Liu Chuanxing	Brisbane Bullets	Special Restricted	DP	DP		
8 September 2021	(China) Zhou Qi	South East Melbourne Phoenix	Restricted	Contracted	Option		
9 September 2021	(Australia) William Hickey	Melbourne United	Development	DP	Option		
14 September 2021	(Australia) Jack Purchase	Perth Wildcats	Development	DP	DP		
15 September 2021	(Australia) Max Mackinnon	Brisbane Bullets	Development	DP			
23 September 2021	(France) Hugo Besson	New Zealand Breakers	Restricted	Contracted	Contracted	Contracted	
3 October 2021	(United States) Jeremiah Martin	New Zealand Breakers	Restricted	Contracted			
7 October 2021	(New Zealand) Brayden Inger	Cairns Taipans	Development	DP			
15 October 2021	(United States) Michael Frazier II	Perth Wildcats	Restricted	Contracted			
15 October 2021	(Australia) Matt Hodgson	Perth Wildcats	Unrestricted	Contracted			
16 October 2021	(Australia) Lachlan Olbrich	Adelaide 36ers	Development	DP			
19 October 2021	(Canada) Xavier Rathan-Mayes	Illawarra Hawks	Restricted	Contracted			
26 October 2021	(Australia) Zac Gattorna	Adelaide 36ers	Development	DP			
30 October 2021	(Australia) Oliver Hayes-Brown	Perth Wildcats	Development	DP	DP		
3 November 2021	(New Zealand) Hyrum Harris	Adelaide 36ers	Unrestricted	Contracted			
8 November 2021	(Australia) Cameron Bairstow	Adelaide 36ers	Unrestricted	Contracted			
10 November 2021	(India) Princepal Singh	New Zealand Breakers	Development	DP	DP		
10 November 2021	(Australia) Nick Marshall	Adelaide 36ers	Development	DP			
15 November 2021	(Australia) Alex Mudronja	Illawarra Hawks	Mixed	IRP	Contracted	Option	
18 November 2021	(Australia) Owen Foxwell	South East Melbourne Phoenix	Development	DP			
19 November 2021	(United States) Devin Thomas	South East Melbourne Phoenix	Restricted	Contracted			
2 December 2021	(Australia) Mitch Clarke	Perth Wildcats	Development	DP			
3 December 2021	(Australia) Koen Sapwell	South East Melbourne Phoenix	Development	DP			
16 December 2021	(United States) Chasson Randle	New Zealand Breakers	Injury Replacement	IRP			
30 December 2021	(Australia) Marshall Nelson	Cairns Taipans	Injury Replacement	IRP			
11 January 2022	(United States) Brandon Ashley	South East Melbourne Phoenix	Restricted	Contracted			
1 April 2022	(Australia) Ben Ayre	Cairns Taipans	Injury Replacement	IRP			

=== Next Star program ===
The Next Star Program is designed to provide young elite overseas players, mainly Americans, with a professional option immediately out of secondary school. Each team receives one additional import roster slot intended to provide a "Next Star" slot. Contracts are two-year contracts with the NBL which allows players to move between clubs between seasons.

==== Signings ====
Date signed	Player	Team	Contract length	Ref
2 June 2021	(France) Ousmane Dieng	New Zealand Breakers	Two seasons	
28 July 2021	(Germany) Ariel Hukporti	Melbourne United	Two seasons	
29 July 2021	(Russia) Nikita Mikhailovskii	Tasmania JackJumpers	Two seasons	
21 August 2021	(Australia) Makur Maker	Sydney Kings	Two seasons	
6 September 2021	(France) Tom Digbeu	Brisbane Bullets	Two seasons	

==== Transfers ====
Date signed	Player	Former Team	New Team	Remaining contract length	Ref
14 July 2021	(New Zealand) Mojave King	Cairns Taipans	Adelaide 36ers	One season	

=== Departing the league ===
*	Denotes international players who returned to their home country

Player	NBL team	Date signed	New team	New league	Ref
Craig Moller	Sydney Kings	18 June 2020	s.Oliver Würzburg	BBL	
Colton Iverson	New Zealand Breakers	24 June 2021	Akita Northern Happinets	B.League	
Brandon Paul	Adelaide 36ers	9 July 2021	Club Joventut Badalona	Liga ACB	
John Mooney	Perth Wildcats	15 July 2021	Chiba Jets Funabashi	B.League	
Josh Giddey	Adelaide 36ers	30 July 2021	Oklahoma City Thunder	NBA	
Keifer Sykes*	South East Melbourne Phoenix	5 August 2021	Indiana Pacers	NBA	
Justin Simon	Illawarra Hawks	19 August 2021	ratiopharm Ulm	BBL	
Corey Webster	New Zealand Breakers	20 August 2021	Al Ittihad	EBSL	
Jock Landale	Melbourne United	21 August 2021	San Antonio Spurs	NBA	
Devondrick Walker	South East Melbourne Phoenix	22 August 2021	VEF Rīga	L-EBL	
Levi Randolph	New Zealand Breakers	16 August 2021	Oostende	BNXT League	

== Rosters ==
Note: Flags indicate national team eligibility at FIBA-sanctioned events. Players may hold other non-FIBA nationalities not displayed.

=== Adelaide 36ers ===
2021–22 Adelaide 36ers roster
Players
Coaches

Pos.	No.	Nat.	Name	Ht.	Wt.	Age
G	1	(Australia)	Dufelmeier, Tad	1.83 m (6 ft 0 in)	79 kg (174 lb)	30 – 9 February 1996
F	2	(South Sudan)	Malou, Emmanuel	2.06 m (6 ft 9 in)	98 kg (216 lb)	32 – 3 November 1993
G	3	(United States)	Hannahs, Dusty (I)	1.93 m (6 ft 4 in)	88 kg (194 lb)	32 – 2 October 1993
G	7	(New Zealand)	King, Mojave (NS)	1.95 m (6 ft 5 in)	88 kg (194 lb)	24 – 11 June 2002
C	8	(Australia)	Humphries, Isaac (injured)	2.11 m (6 ft 11 in)	116 kg (256 lb)	28 – 5 January 1998
F	9	(Australia)	Marshall, Nick (DP)	1.98 m (6 ft 6 in)	93 kg (205 lb)	26 – 5 July 1999
G	10	(Australia)	McCarron, Mitch (C)	1.89 m (6 ft 2 in)	97 kg (214 lb)	34 – 30 June 1992
C	11	(Philippines)	Sotto, Kai (SRP)	2.20 m (7 ft 3 in)	105 kg (231 lb)	24 – 11 May 2002
F	21	(Australia)	Johnson, Daniel	2.12 m (6 ft 11 in)	108 kg (238 lb)	38 – 3 April 1988
F	22	(New Zealand)	Harris, Hyrum	1.98 m (6 ft 6 in)	90 kg (198 lb)	30 – 6 March 1996
F	25	(Australia)	Gattorna, Isaac (DP)	2.01 m (6 ft 7 in)	94 kg (207 lb)	27 – 8 May 1999
G	30	(Australia)	Olbrich, Lachlan (DP)	2.08 m (6 ft 10 in)		22 – 30 December 2003
F	35	(United States)	Withers, Todd (I)	2.02 m (6 ft 8 in)	98 kg (216 lb)	30 – 6 May 1996
F	41	(Australia)	Bairstow, Cameron	2.06 m (6 ft 9 in)	113 kg (249 lb)	35 – 7 December 1990
G	44	(South Sudan)	Dech, Sunday	1.95 m (6 ft 5 in)	93 kg (205 lb)	32 – 1 January 1994

Head coach

- (Australia) C. J. Bruton

Assistant coach(es)

- (Australia) Jamie Pearlman

Legend

- (C) Team captain
- (DP) Development player
- (IN) Inactive
- (I) Import player
- (SRP) Special restricted player
- (NS) Next Star player
- Injured

- Roster
Updated: 13 February 2022

=== Brisbane Bullets ===
2021–22 Brisbane Bullets roster
Players
Coaches

Pos.	No.	Nat.	Name	Ht.	Wt.	Age
G	0	(Australia)	Wigness, Tamuri	1.80 m (5 ft 11 in)	84 kg (185 lb)	24 – 26 March 2002
F	1	(United States)	Franks, Robert (I)	2.01 m (6 ft 7 in)	102 kg (225 lb)	29 – 18 December 1996
F	2	(New Zealand)	Samuel, Taane (DP)	2.00 m (6 ft 7 in)	105 kg (231 lb)	27 – 26 April 1999
G/F	3	(Australia)	Drmic, Anthony	1.98 m (6 ft 6 in)	93 kg (205 lb)	34 – 25 February 1992
G	4	(United States)	Moss, Isaiah (I)	1.96 m (6 ft 5 in)	94 kg (207 lb)	29 – 8 October 1996
G	5	(Australia)	Cadee, Jason (C)	1.86 m (6 ft 1 in)	80 kg (176 lb)	35 – 15 April 1991
F	9	(Australia)	Mackinnon, Max (DP)	1.96 m (6 ft 5 in)	96 kg (212 lb)	22 – 9 October 2003
G/F	10	(France)	Digbeu, Tom (NS)	1.96 m (6 ft 5 in)	77 kg (170 lb)	24 – 24 September 2001
G/F	13	(United States)	Patterson, Lamar (I)	1.96 m (6 ft 5 in)	100 kg (220 lb)	34 – 12 August 1991
G	17	(Australia)	Krebs, Tanner	1.98 m (6 ft 6 in)	91 kg (201 lb)	30 – 4 January 1996
G	20	(Australia)	Sobey, Nathan	1.88 m (6 ft 2 in)	86 kg (190 lb)	35 – 14 July 1990
C	21	(China)	Chuanxing Liu (DP & SRP)	2.26 m (7 ft 5 in)	130 kg (287 lb)	28 – 30 July 1997
C	24	(New Zealand)	Harrison, Tyrell	2.14 m (7 ft 0 in)	95 kg (209 lb)	26 – 6 July 1999
F	27	(South Sudan)	Deng, Deng	2.03 m (6 ft 8 in)	93 kg (205 lb)	34 – 5 January 1992
C	33	(New Zealand)	Salt, Jack	2.08 m (6 ft 10 in)	117 kg (258 lb)	30 – 11 February 1996

Head coach

- (Canada) James Duncan

Assistant coach(es)

- (Australia) Greg Vanderjagt
- (Australia) Peter Crawford

Legend

- (C) Team captain
- (DP) Development player
- (IN) Inactive
- (I) Import player
- (SRP) Special restricted player
- (NS) Next Star player
- Injured

- Roster
Updated: 11 October 2021

=== Cairns Taipans ===
2021–22 Cairns Taipans roster
Players
Coaches

Pos.	No.	Nat.	Name	Ht.	Wt.	Age
G	3	(Brazil)	Machado, Scott (injured) (I & C)	1.85 m (6 ft 1 in)	82 kg (181 lb)	36 – 8 June 1990
G	5	(Australia)	Đerić, Mirko	1.88 m (6 ft 2 in)	82 kg (181 lb)	31 – 17 April 1995
G	6	(New Zealand)	Kenny, Jarrod	1.88 m (6 ft 2 in)	87 kg (192 lb)	40 – 17 September 1985
F	9	(New Zealand)	Inger, Brayden (DP)	2.03 m (6 ft 8 in)	95 kg (209 lb)	27 – 18 March 1999
G	10	(Australia)	Ayre, Ben	1.88 m (6 ft 2 in)	82 kg (181 lb)	30 – 8 December 1995
F	11	(New Zealand)	Ngatai, Jordan	1.96 m (6 ft 5 in)	98 kg (216 lb)	33 – 7 March 1993
F	12	(Australia)	Noi, Kouat	2.01 m (6 ft 7 in)	93 kg (205 lb)	28 – 29 October 1997
F	13	(South Sudan)	Deng, Majok	2.08 m (6 ft 10 in)	84 kg (185 lb)	33 – 1 March 1993
C	15	(Australia)	Jawai, Nathan	2.09 m (6 ft 10 in)	140 kg (309 lb)	39 – 10 October 1986
G	22	(United States)	McCall, Tahjere (I)	1.93 m (6 ft 4 in)	86 kg (190 lb)	31 – 17 August 1994
F	25	(Australia)	Pinder, Keanu	2.05 m (6 ft 9 in)	100 kg (220 lb)	31 – 28 May 1995
C	33	(United States)	Zimmerman, Stephen (I)	2.11 m (6 ft 11 in)	109 kg (240 lb)	29 – 9 October 1996
F	42	(South Sudan)	Kuol, Bul	2.01 m (6 ft 7 in)	93 kg (205 lb)	29 – 10 January 1997
G	44	(Australia)	Nelson, Marshall	1.88 m (6 ft 2 in)	85 kg (187 lb)	32 – 31 January 1994
G	45	(Australia)	Heath, Robbie (TP)	1.90 m (6 ft 3 in)	82 kg (181 lb)	27 – 27 November 1998

Head coach

- (Australia) Adam Forde

Assistant coach(es)

- (Australia) Sam Gruggen
- (Australia) Kerry Williams

Legend

- (C) Team captain
- (DP) Development player
- (IN) Inactive
- (I) Import player
- (SRP) Special restricted player
- (NS) Next Star player
- Injured

- Roster
Updated: 2 April 2022

=== Illawarra Hawks ===
2021–22 Illawarra Hawks roster
Players
Coaches

Pos.	No.	Nat.	Name	Ht.	Wt.	Age
G	0	(United States)	Cleveland, Antonius (I)	1.96 m (6 ft 5 in)	88 kg (194 lb)	32 – 2 February 1994
G	1	(United States)	Harvey, Tyler (I)	1.93 m (6 ft 4 in)	84 kg (185 lb)	32 – 17 July 1993
G	2	(Australia)	White, Isaac	1.88 m (6 ft 2 in)	82 kg (181 lb)	28 – 22 June 1998
G	3	(Australia)	Naar, Emmett	1.85 m (6 ft 1 in)	88 kg (194 lb)	31 – 3 July 1994
C	6	(Australia)	Ogilvy, Andrew (C)	2.11 m (6 ft 11 in)	115 kg (254 lb)	38 – 17 June 1988
G	7	(Australia)	Dent, Lachlan (DP)	1.83 m (6 ft 0 in)		26 – 1 February 2000
G	8	(Canada)	Rathan-Mayes, Xavier (I)	1.93 m (6 ft 4 in)	91 kg (201 lb)	32 – 29 April 1994
G	10	(United States)	Jessup, Justinian (NS)	2.01 m (6 ft 7 in)	92 kg (203 lb)	28 – 23 May 1998
G/F	11	(Australia)	Grida, Daniel (injured)	1.97 m (6 ft 6 in)	93 kg (205 lb)	28 – 26 April 1998
F/C	13	(Australia)	Froling, Sam	2.13 m (7 ft 0 in)	109 kg (240 lb)	26 – 10 February 2000
G	15	(Australia)	Mudronja, Alex	1.96 m (6 ft 5 in)	88 kg (194 lb)	26 – 3 September 1999
F	22	(Australia)	Coenraad, Tim	1.99 m (6 ft 6 in)	97 kg (214 lb)	41 – 5 June 1985
F/C	26	(Australia)	Reath, Duop	2.11 m (6 ft 11 in)	111 kg (245 lb)	30 – 26 June 1996
C	31	(Australia)	Froling, Harry	2.11 m (6 ft 11 in)	120 kg (265 lb)	28 – 20 April 1998
F	47	(Australia)	Gak, Akoldah	2.11 m (6 ft 11 in)	91 kg (201 lb)	23 – 12 July 2002

Head coach

- (United States) Brian Goorjian

Assistant coach(es)

- (Australia) Jacob Jackomas
- (Australia) Shaun Roger

Legend

- (C) Team captain
- (DP) Development player
- (IN) Inactive
- (I) Import player
- (SRP) Special restricted player
- (NS) Next Star player
- Injured

- Roster
Updated: 15 November 2021

=== Melbourne United ===
2021–22 Melbourne United roster
Players
Coaches

Pos.	No.	Nat.	Name	Ht.	Wt.	Age
C	0	(South Sudan)	Lual-Acuil, Jo	2.11 m (6 ft 11 in)	103 kg (227 lb)	32 – 26 April 1994
G	1	(Australia)	Triplett, Zac (DP)	1.98 m (6 ft 6 in)	85 kg (187 lb)	24 – 19 October 2001
G/F	4	(Australia)	Newley, Brad	1.98 m (6 ft 6 in)	96 kg (212 lb)	41 – 18 February 1985
G	6	(Australia)	Hickey, William (DP)	1.94 m (6 ft 4 in)	92 kg (203 lb)	27 – 18 January 1999
G	7	(Nigeria)	Agada, Caleb (I)	1.93 m (6 ft 4 in)	95 kg (209 lb)	31 – 31 August 1994
G	8	(Australia)	Dellavedova, Matthew	1.93 m (6 ft 4 in)	91 kg (201 lb)	35 – 8 September 1990
F/C	12	(Australia)	Dalton, Callum (injured)	2.06 m (6 ft 9 in)	115 kg (254 lb)	26 – 4 May 2000
G/F	13	(New Zealand)	Prewster, Dion	1.95 m (6 ft 5 in)	96 kg (212 lb)	36 – 10 January 1990
F	14	(Australia)	White, Jack	2.00 m (6 ft 7 in)	102 kg (225 lb)	28 – 5 August 1997
C	15	(Germany)	Hukporti, Ariel (NS)	2.13 m (7 ft 0 in)	113 kg (249 lb)	24 – 12 April 2002
G	18	(Japan)	Baba, Yudai (SRP)	1.96 m (6 ft 5 in)	90 kg (198 lb)	30 – 7 November 1995
F	20	(Australia)	Barlow, David	2.05 m (6 ft 9 in)	103 kg (227 lb)	42 – 22 October 1983
F	22	(Australia)	Peatling, Mason	2.03 m (6 ft 8 in)	105 kg (231 lb)	29 – 31 March 1997
F	35	(Australia)	Okwera, David (DP)	2.08 m (6 ft 10 in)	90 kg (198 lb)	23 – 31 July 2002
G	43	(Australia)	Goulding, Chris (C)	1.92 m (6 ft 4 in)	92 kg (203 lb)	37 – 24 October 1988
G	51	(New Zealand)	Ili, Shea	1.84 m (6 ft 0 in)	87 kg (192 lb)	33 – 6 October 1992

Head coach

- (Australia) Dean Vickerman

Assistant coach(es)

- (Australia) Rhys Carter
- (Australia) Darryl McDonald
- (Australia) Justin Schueller

Team manager

- (Australia) Stephan Semerci

Legend

- (C) Team captain
- (DP) Development player
- (IN) Inactive
- (I) Import player
- (SRP) Special restricted player
- (NS) Next Star player
- Injured

- Roster
Updated: 23 March 2022

=== New Zealand Breakers ===
2021–22 New Zealand Breakers roster
Players
Coaches

Pos.	No.	Nat.	Name	Ht.	Wt.	Age
G	1	(United States)	Siva, Peyton (I)	1.83 m (6 ft 0 in)	84 kg (185 lb)	35 – 24 October 1990
F	3	(New Zealand)	Delany, Finn	1.98 m (6 ft 6 in)	102 kg (225 lb)	30 – 12 August 1995
F	6	(Australia)	Galloway, Kyrin	2.03 m (6 ft 8 in)	97 kg (214 lb)	26 – 7 October 1999
G	7	(Australia)	McDowell-White, Will	1.96 m (6 ft 5 in)	84 kg (185 lb)	28 – 13 April 1998
G	8	(United States)	Randle, Chasson (I)	1.88 m (6 ft 2 in)	84 kg (185 lb)	33 – 5 February 1993
G/F	10	(New Zealand)	Abercrombie, Thomas (C)	1.98 m (6 ft 6 in)	90 kg (198 lb)	38 – 5 July 1987
G	11	(France)	Dieng, Ousmane (NS)	2.05 m (6 ft 9 in)	98 kg (216 lb)	23 – 21 May 2003
F	12	(New Zealand)	Davidson, Isaac	2.02 m (6 ft 8 in)	100 kg (220 lb)	29 – 22 June 1997
F/C	15	(New Zealand)	Loe, Robert	2.11 m (6 ft 11 in)	111 kg (245 lb)	34 – 5 August 1991
G	18	(Denmark)	Bach, Rasmus	1.93 m (6 ft 4 in)	84 kg (185 lb)	30 – 22 July 1995
G	25	(France)	Besson, Hugo (I)	1.91 m (6 ft 3 in)	89 kg (196 lb)	25 – 26 April 2001
F/C	33	(New Zealand)	Timmins, Sam (DP)	2.11 m (6 ft 11 in)	120 kg (265 lb)	29 – 23 May 1997
F/C	45	(India)	Singh, Princepal (DP)	2.06 m (6 ft 9 in)	100 kg (220 lb)	25 – 3 January 2001
G	88	(Australia)	Short, Sam	1.95 m (6 ft 5 in)	78 kg (172 lb)	28 – 11 February 1998

Head coach

- (Israel) Dan Shamir

Assistant coach(es)

- (Israel) Mody Maor

Strength & conditioning coach(es)

- (New Zealand) Emily Nolan

Legend

- (C) Team captain
- (DP) Development player
- (IN) Inactive
- (I) Import player
- (SRP) Special restricted player
- (NS) Next Star player
- Injured

- Roster
Updated: 17 April 2022

=== Perth Wildcats ===
2021–22 Perth Wildcats roster
Players
Coaches

Pos.	No.	Nat.	Name	Ht.	Wt.	Age
F	1	(United States)	Law, Vic (I)	2.01 m (6 ft 7 in)	91 kg (201 lb)	30 – 19 December 1995
F	2	(Australia)	Purchase, Jack	2.06 m (6 ft 9 in)	95 kg (209 lb)	31 – 26 June 1995
G	3	(Australia)	White, Kevin	1.87 m (6 ft 2 in)	94 kg (207 lb)	39 – 7 April 1987
F/C	5	(Australia)	Hayes-Brown, Oliver (DP)	2.08 m (6 ft 10 in)	114 kg (251 lb)	26 – 28 April 2000
G	8	(Australia)	Norton, Mitch	1.86 m (6 ft 1 in)	91 kg (201 lb)	33 – 1 April 1993
G	9	(Australia)	Zunic, Kyle (DP)	1.88 m (6 ft 2 in)	91 kg (201 lb)	27 – 4 May 1999
G	11	(United States)	Cotton, Bryce (I)	1.82 m (6 ft 0 in)	75 kg (165 lb)	33 – 11 August 1992
G/F	12	(Australia)	Blanchfield, Todd	2.00 m (6 ft 7 in)	95 kg (209 lb)	34 – 7 November 1991
C	18	(Australia)	Hodgson, Matt	2.11 m (6 ft 11 in)	115 kg (254 lb)	34 – 2 August 1991
G	20	(United States)	Frazier II, Michael (I)	1.93 m (6 ft 4 in)	91 kg (201 lb)	32 – 8 March 1994
F/C	22	(South Sudan)	Majok, Majok	2.06 m (6 ft 9 in)	111 kg (245 lb)	33 – 10 December 1992
G	23	(Australia)	Travers, Luke	2.01 m (6 ft 7 in)	93 kg (205 lb)	24 – 3 September 2001
F	24	(Australia)	Wagstaff, Jesse (C)	2.03 m (6 ft 8 in)	103 kg (227 lb)	40 – 30 April 1986
F	25	(Australia)	Shervill, Corey (injured) (DP)	2.01 m (6 ft 7 in)	100 kg (220 lb)	28 – 19 March 1998
G	41	(Australia)	Clarke, Mitch (DP)	1.85 m (6 ft 1 in)		26 – 26 November 1999

Head coach

- (Canada) Scott Morrison

Assistant coach(es)

- (United States) Mike Kelly
- (Australia) Luke Brennan
- (Australia) Keegan Crawford

Strength & conditioning coach(es)

- (Australia) Josh Cavanagh

Legend

- (C) Team captain
- (DP) Development player
- (IN) Inactive
- (I) Import player
- (SRP) Special restricted player
- (NS) Next Star player
- Injured

- Roster
Updated: 11 January 2022

=== South East Melbourne Phoenix ===
2021–22 South East Melbourne Phoenix roster
Players
Coaches

Pos.	No.	Nat.	Name	Ht.	Wt.	Age
G	1	(Australia)	Gibson, Adam	1.88 m (6 ft 2 in)	95 kg (209 lb)	39 – 30 October 1986
G	3	(Australia)	Gliddon, Cameron	1.97 m (6 ft 6 in)	94 kg (207 lb)	36 – 16 August 1989
G	4	(Australia)	Adnam, Kyle (C)	1.86 m (6 ft 1 in)	83 kg (183 lb)	32 – 18 November 1993
G	5	(United States)	Munford, Xavier (I)	1.93 m (6 ft 4 in)	78 kg (172 lb)	34 – 1 June 1992
G/F	7	(New Zealand)	Te Rangi, Reuben	1.98 m (6 ft 6 in)	105 kg (231 lb)	31 – 14 October 1994
G	8	(New Zealand)	Le'afa, Izayah	1.88 m (6 ft 2 in)	90 kg (198 lb)	29 – 7 November 1996
G	9	(Australia)	Sapwell, Koen (DP)	1.93 m (6 ft 4 in)
F	13	(United States)	Ashley, Brandon (I)	2.06 m (6 ft 9 in)	104 kg (229 lb)	31 – 15 July 1994
F	14	(New Zealand)	Smith-Milner, Tohi	2.05 m (6 ft 9 in)	112 kg (247 lb)	30 – 6 October 1995
C	22	(Australia)	Pineau, Dane	2.06 m (6 ft 9 in)	102 kg (225 lb)	31 – 2 August 1994
F	25	(United States)	Taylor Jr., Steve (IN)	2.06 m (6 ft 9 in)	109 kg (240 lb)	33 – 15 February 1993
C	26	(China)	Zhou Qi (SRP)	2.16 m (7 ft 1 in)	96 kg (212 lb)	30 – 16 January 1996
G	30	(Australia)	Foxwell, Owen (DP)	1.87 m (6 ft 2 in)	78 kg (172 lb)	22 – 17 August 2003
F/C	34	(Australia)	Forsyth, Tristan (DP)	2.08 m (6 ft 10 in)	107 kg (236 lb)	28 – 19 January 1998
G	40	(Australia)	Barker, Lachlan	1.88 m (6 ft 2 in)	83 kg (183 lb)	29 – 14 July 1996
G/F	45	(Australia)	Broekhoff, Ryan	1.98 m (6 ft 6 in)	98 kg (216 lb)	35 – 23 August 1990
G/F	55	(Australia)	Creek, Mitch	1.96 m (6 ft 5 in)	98 kg (216 lb)	34 – 27 April 1992

Head coach

- (Australia) Simon Mitchell

Assistant coach(es)

- (New Zealand) Judd Flavell
- (Australia) Luke Kendall

Legend

- (C) Team captain
- (DP) Development player
- (IN) Inactive
- (I) Import player
- (SRP) Special restricted player
- (NS) Next Star player
- Injured

- Roster
Updated: 10 February 2022

=== Sydney Kings ===
2021–22 Sydney Kings roster
Players
Coaches

Pos.	No.	Nat.	Name	Ht.	Wt.	Age
C	1	(Australia)	Hunter, Jordan (injured)	2.08 m (6 ft 10 in)	104 kg (229 lb)	28 – 20 August 1997
G	2	(United States)	Adams, Jaylen (injured) (I)	1.88 m (6 ft 2 in)	86 kg (190 lb)	30 – 4 May 1996
G	3	(Australia)	Vasiljevic, Dejan	1.91 m (6 ft 3 in)	86 kg (190 lb)	29 – 26 April 1997
C	4	(Australia)	Maker, Makur (NS)	2.11 m (6 ft 11 in)	107 kg (236 lb)	25 – 4 November 2000
G	5	(Australia)	Glover, Angus	1.93 m (6 ft 4 in)	87 kg (192 lb)	27 – 8 September 1998
F	6	(Australia)	Galloway, Jaylin (DP)	2.01 m (6 ft 7 in)	82 kg (181 lb)	23 – 21 December 2002
G	7	(Australia)	Bruce, Shaun (C)	1.90 m (6 ft 3 in)	82 kg (181 lb)	35 – 13 January 1991
F/C	8	(South Sudan)	Maker, Matur	2.08 m (6 ft 10 in)	95 kg (209 lb)	28 – 1 January 1998
G/F	9	(Australia)	Swaka Lo Buluk, Wani	1.94 m (6 ft 4 in)	87 kg (192 lb)	25 – 9 June 2001
F	10	(Australia)	Cooks, Xavier (C)	2.03 m (6 ft 8 in)	84 kg (185 lb)	30 – 19 September 1995
F	12	(United States)	Martin, Jarell (I)	2.08 m (6 ft 10 in)	108 kg (238 lb)	32 – 24 May 1994
F	13	(New Zealand)	Vodanovich, Tom	2.01 m (6 ft 7 in)	104 kg (229 lb)	31 – 28 July 1994
G	14	(Australia)	Bayles, Biwali	1.88 m (6 ft 2 in)	84 kg (185 lb)	24 – 15 February 2002
G	20	(Australia)	Mitchell, Iggy (DP)	1.85 m (6 ft 1 in)	83 kg (183 lb)
G	21	(United States)	Clark, Ian (I)	1.91 m (6 ft 3 in)	79 kg (174 lb)	35 – 7 March 1991
G	30	(Australia)	Hodgson, Jayden (DP)	1.90 m (6 ft 3 in)

Head coach

- (United States) Chase Buford

Assistant coach(es)

- (United States) Kevin Lisch
- (Australia) Fleur McIntyre
- (Australia) Lachlan Lonergan
- (Australia) Daniel Kickert

Legend

- (C) Team captain
- (DP) Development player
- (IN) Inactive
- (I) Import player
- (SRP) Special restricted player
- (NS) Next Star player
- Injured

- Roster
Updated: 7 May 2022

=== Tasmania JackJumpers ===
2021–22 Tasmania JackJumpers roster
Players
Coaches

Pos.	No.	Nat.	Name	Ht.	Wt.	Age
F	0	(Canada)	McIntosh, MiKyle (I)	2.01 m (6 ft 7 in)	109 kg (240 lb)	31 – 19 July 1994
G	1	(Australia)	Kenyon, Matt	1.96 m (6 ft 5 in)	91 kg (201 lb)	28 – 8 February 1998
G	2	(United States)	Magette, Josh (I)	1.85 m (6 ft 1 in)	73 kg (161 lb)	36 – 28 November 1989
G	7	(Australia)	Deans, Sejr (DP)	1.87 m (6 ft 2 in)	88 kg (194 lb)	23 – 29 January 2003
G	9	(Australia)	McVeigh, Jack	2.03 m (6 ft 8 in)	95 kg (209 lb)	30 – 27 June 1996
G	13	(Australia)	Macdonald, Sean (DP)	1.88 m (6 ft 2 in)	87 kg (192 lb)	26 – 21 April 2000
G	14	(United States)	Adams, Josh (I)	1.88 m (6 ft 2 in)	86 kg (190 lb)	32 – 16 November 1993
C	15	(Australia)	Perry, Jock (DP)	2.16 m (7 ft 1 in)	113 kg (249 lb)	27 – 20 May 1999
F	20	(Australia)	Krslovic, Fabijan	2.03 m (6 ft 8 in)	108 kg (238 lb)	31 – 23 June 1995
F	21	(Australia)	Bairstow, Jarred	2.01 m (6 ft 7 in)	104 kg (229 lb)	33 – 5 November 1992
C	22	(Australia)	Magnay, Will (injured)	2.08 m (6 ft 10 in)	106 kg (234 lb)	28 – 10 June 1998
G	30	(Australia)	McDaniel, Sam	1.98 m (6 ft 6 in)	95 kg (209 lb)	30 – 9 December 1995
G/F	35	(Australia)	Steindl, Clint (C)	2.00 m (6 ft 7 in)	91 kg (201 lb)	37 – 15 March 1989
G	97	(Australia)	Weeks, Jarrad	1.83 m (6 ft 0 in)	80 kg (176 lb)	36 – 11 July 1989

Head coach

- (United States) Scott Roth

Assistant coach(es)

- (Australia) Jacob Chance
- (Australia) Mark Radford
- (Australia) Jack Fleming

Team manager

- (Australia) Mark Chivers

Legend

- (C) Team captain
- (DP) Development player
- (IN) Inactive
- (I) Import player
- (SRP) Special restricted player
- (NS) Next Star player
- Injured

- Roster
Updated: 11 March 2022

== See also ==
- 2021–22 NBL season
- National Basketball League (Australia)
