= 2021–22 New Zealand Breakers season =

- Head coach: (Israel) Dan Shamir
- Captain: (New Zealand) Thomas Abercrombie
- Arena: Derwent Entertainment Centre

NBL results
- Record: 5–23 (17.9%)
- Ladder: 10th
- Finals finish: Did not qualify
- Stats at NBL.com.au

Player records
- Points: (New Zealand) Wetzell 17.7
- Rebounds: (New Zealand) Wetzell 8.2
- Assists: (United States) Siva 4.9
- All statistics correct as of 24 April 2022.

The 2021–22 NBL season was the 19th season for the New Zealand Breakers in the NBL.

== Roster ==
Note: Flags indicate national team eligibility at FIBA-sanctioned events. Players may hold other non-FIBA nationalities not displayed.

2021–22 New Zealand Breakers roster
Players
Coaches

Pos.	No.	Nat.	Name	Ht.	Wt.	Age
G	1	(United States)	Siva, Peyton (I)	1.83 m (6 ft 0 in)	84 kg (185 lb)	35 – 24 October 1990
F	3	(New Zealand)	Delany, Finn	1.98 m (6 ft 6 in)	102 kg (225 lb)	31 – 12 August 1995
F	6	(Australia)	Galloway, Kyrin	2.03 m (6 ft 8 in)	97 kg (214 lb)	26 – 7 October 1999
G	7	(Australia)	McDowell-White, Will	1.96 m (6 ft 5 in)	84 kg (185 lb)	28 – 13 April 1998
G	8	(United States)	Randle, Chasson (I)	1.88 m (6 ft 2 in)	84 kg (185 lb)	33 – 5 February 1993
G/F	10	(New Zealand)	Abercrombie, Thomas (C)	1.98 m (6 ft 6 in)	90 kg (198 lb)	39 – 5 July 1987
G	11	(France)	Dieng, Ousmane (NS)	2.05 m (6 ft 9 in)	98 kg (216 lb)	23 – 21 May 2003
F	12	(New Zealand)	Davidson, Isaac	2.02 m (6 ft 8 in)	100 kg (220 lb)	29 – 22 June 1997
F/C	15	(New Zealand)	Loe, Robert	2.11 m (6 ft 11 in)	111 kg (245 lb)	35 – 5 August 1991
G	18	(Denmark)	Bach, Rasmus	1.93 m (6 ft 4 in)	84 kg (185 lb)	31 – 22 July 1995
G	25	(France)	Besson, Hugo (I)	1.91 m (6 ft 3 in)	89 kg (196 lb)	25 – 26 April 2001
F/C	33	(New Zealand)	Timmins, Sam (DP)	2.11 m (6 ft 11 in)	120 kg (265 lb)	29 – 23 May 1997
F/C	45	(India)	Singh, Princepal (DP)	2.06 m (6 ft 9 in)	100 kg (220 lb)	25 – 3 January 2001
G	88	(Australia)	Short, Sam	1.95 m (6 ft 5 in)	78 kg (172 lb)	28 – 11 February 1998

Head coach

- (Israel) Dan Shamir

Assistant coach(es)

- (Israel) Mody Maor

Strength & conditioning coach(es)

- (New Zealand) Emily Nolan

Legend

- (C) Team captain
- (DP) Development player
- (IN) Inactive
- (I) Import player
- (SRP) Special restricted player
- (NS) Next Star player
- Injured

- Roster
Updated: 17 April 2022

== Pre-season ==
=== Game log ===
2021 NBL Blitz game log
Total: 2–1 (Home: 2–0; Road: 0–1)
November: 2–1 (Home: 2–0; Road: 0–1)

Game	Date	Team	Score	High points	High rebounds	High assists	Location Attendance	Record
1	13 November	@ Melbourne	L 90–84	Finn Delany (20)	Sam Timmins (7)	Peyton Siva (3)	Melbourne Sports and Aquatic Centre closed event	0–1
2	18 November	Sydney	W 97–93	Jeremiah Martin (23)	Peyton Siva (6)	Martin, Siva (7)	Melbourne Sports and Aquatic Centre closed event	1–1
3	20 November	S.E. Melbourne	W 92–90	Hugo Besson (24)	Yanni Wetzell (12)	McDowell-White, Siva (4)	Melbourne Sports and Aquatic Centre closed event	2–1

Cancelled

Game	Date	Team	Score	High points	High rebounds	High assists	Location Attendance	Record
1	25 November	@ Illawarra	Cancelled					

== Regular season ==
=== Ladder ===
Pos	2021–22 NBL season											
Pos	Team	Pld	W	L	PCT	Last 5	Streak	Home	Away	PF	PA	PP
1	Melbourne United	28	20	8	71.43%	4–1	L1	9–5	11–3	2455	2244	109.40%
2	Illawarra Hawks	28	19	9	67.86%	4–1	W2	8–6	11–3	2498	2345	106.52%
3	Sydney Kings	28	19	9	67.86%	3–2	L1	9–5	10–4	2397	2313	103.63%
4	Tasmania JackJumpers	28	17	11	60.71%	4–1	W4	8–6	9–5	2230	2220	100.45%
5	Perth Wildcats	28	16	12	57.14%	2–3	L2	7–7	9–5	2495	2377	104.96%
6	S.E. Melbourne Phoenix	28	15	13	53.57%	3–2	W2	7–7	8–6	2456	2424	101.32%
7	Adelaide 36ers	28	10	18	35.71%	3–2	W1	6–8	4–10	2283	2346	97.31%
8	Brisbane Bullets	28	10	18	35.71%	2–3	L2	6–8	4–10	2379	2500	95.16%
9	Cairns Taipans	28	9	19	32.14%	1–4	W1	5–9	4–10	2228	2408	92.52%
10	New Zealand Breakers	28	5	23	17.86%	0–5	L10	2–12	3–11	2234	2478	90.15%

Updated to match(es) played on 24 April 2022. Source: NBL.com.au

=== Ladder progression ===
- Numbers highlighted in green indicate that the team finished the round inside the top four.
- Numbers highlighted in blue indicates the team finished first on the ladder in that round.
- Numbers highlighted in red indicates the team finished last place on the ladder in that round.

2021–22 NBL season
Team	1	2	3	4	5	6	7	8	9	10	11	12	13	14	15	16	17	18	19	20	21
Adelaide 36ers	8	6	8	8	8	8	7	8	8	8	8	7	8	8	8	8	8	9	9	8	7
Brisbane Bullets	7	5	7	6	6	7	6	5	7	9	7	8	7	7	7	7	7	7	7	7	8
Cairns Taipans	9	7	4	4	5	5	5	6	9	7	9	10	9	9	10	9	9	8	8	9	9
Illawarra Hawks	3	2	3	3	3	3	3	4	4	5	4	5	4	4	5	4	4	3	3	3	2
Melbourne United	6	9	6	5	4	4	1	1	2	3	1	1	1	1	1	1	1	1	1	1	1
New Zealand Breakers	10	10	10	10	10	10	10	10	10	10	10	9	10	10	9	10	10	10	10	10	10
Perth Wildcats	2	3	1	1	1	1	2	2	3	1	2	3	3	3	2	2	3	4	4	4	5
S.E. Melbourne Phoenix	1	1	2	2	2	2	4	3	1	2	3	2	2	2	4	5	5	6	6	6	6
Sydney Kings	5	4	5	7	7	6	8	7	5	6	5	4	5	5	3	3	2	2	2	2	3
Tasmania JackJumpers	4	8	9	9	9	9	9	9	6	4	6	6	6	6	6	6	6	5	5	5	4

=== Game log ===
2021–22 game log
Total: 5–23 (Home: 2–12; Road: 3–11)
December: 0–6 (Home: 0–0; Road: 0–6)

Game	Date	Team	Score	High points	High rebounds	High assists	Location Attendance	Record
1	4 December	@ S.E. Melbourne	L 89–65	Finn Delany (18)	Finn Delany (9)	Jeremiah Martin (4)	John Cain Arena; 3,453	0–1
2	10 December	@ S.E. Melbourne	L 95–88	Finn Delany (26)	Hugo Besson (8)	William McDowell-White (8)	John Cain Arena; 3,752	0–2
3	12 December	@ Adelaide	L 98–85	William McDowell-White (27)	Robert Loe (6)	William McDowell-White (7)	Adelaide Entertainment Centre; 4,445	0–3
4	17 December	@ Illawarra	L 97–96 (2OT)	Yanni Wetzell (25)	Yanni Wetzell (17)	Delany, McDowell-White (4)	WIN Entertainment Centre; 2,873	0–4
5	19 December	@ Melbourne	L 83–60	Finn Delany (14)	Finn Delany (9)	Delany, Martin (4)	John Cain Arena; 5,479	0–5
6	26 December	@ Tasmania	L 84–75	Jeremiah Martin (24)	Yanni Wetzell (10)	Jeremiah Martin (8)	MyState Bank Arena; 4,623	0–6

January: 2–2 (Home: 0–2; Road: 2–0)

Game	Date	Team	Score	High points	High rebounds	High assists	Location Attendance	Record
7	9 January	@ Brisbane	W 83–88	Yanni Wetzell (27)	Yanni Wetzell (8)	Jeremiah Martin (8)	Nissan Arena; 2,925	1–6
8	14 January	Melbourne	L 78–89	Jeremiah Martin (20)	Yanni Wetzell (9)	Peyton Siva (5)	MyState Bank Arena closed event	1–7
9	16 January	@ Sydney	W 75–82	Jeremiah Martin (22)	Finn Delany (9)	Peyton Siva (5)	Qudos Bank Arena; 4,356	2–7
10	30 January	Tasmania	L 59–83	Hugo Besson (19)	Hugo Besson (8)	William McDowell-White (7)	MyState Bank Arena; 1,477	2–8

February: 2–2 (Home: 1–0; Road: 1–2)

Game	Date	Team	Score	High points	High rebounds	High assists	Location Attendance	Record
11	2 February	Illawarra	W 90–67	Yanni Wetzell (22)	Finn Delany (13)	William McDowell-White, (6)	MyState Bank Arena closed event	3–8
12	6 February	@ Sydney	L 84–65	Yanni Wetzell (16)	Delany, Dieng, Wetzell (5)	McDowell-White, Wetzell (3)	Qudos Bank Arena; 5,011	3–9
13	14 February	@ Cairns	W 83–84	Yanni Wetzell (23)	Yanni Wetzell (12)	Hugo Besson (5)	Cairns Convention Centre; 2,795	4–9
14	20 February	@ Melbourne	L 108–73	Besson, Siva (17)	Besson, Delany (5)	Peyton Siva (5)	John Cain Arena; 6,033	4–10

March: 1–7 (Home: 1–5; Road: 0–2)

Game	Date	Team	Score	High points	High rebounds	High assists	Location Attendance	Record
15	1 March	Illawarra	L 87–102	Hugo Besson (20)	Hugo Besson (7)	Peyton Siva (8)	MyState Bank Arena closed event	4–11
16	5 March	@ Tasmania	L 66–62	Chasson Randle (18)	Ousmane Dieng (9)	Peyton Siva (9)	Silverdome; 3,532	4–12
17	7 March	Brisbane	L 74–92	Chasson Randle (20)	Finn Delany (6)	Peyton Siva (6)	MyState Bank Arena closed event	4–13
18	12 March	Adelaide	W 84–75	Hugo Besson (17)	Yanni Wetzell (9)	Peyton Siva (6)	Adelaide Arena; 3,044	5–13
19	14 March	Perth	L 102–104 (OT)	Hugo Besson (23)	Yanni Wetzell (18)	Peyton Siva (7)	MyState Bank Arena closed event	5–14
20	20 March	@ Perth	L 95–85	Yanni Wetzell (15)	Yanni Wetzell (6)	Peyton Siva (9)	RAC Arena; 6,927	5–15
21	24 March	Brisbane	L 100–101 (OT)	Yanni Wetzell (23)	Yanni Wetzell (10)	Peyton Siva (8)	Cairns Convention Centre closed event	5–16
22	27 March	Cairns	L 90–93	Yanni Wetzell (21)	Yanni Wetzell (8)	Hugo Besson (6)	Cairns Convention Centre closed event	5–17

April: 0–6 (Home: 0–5; Road: 0–1)

Game	Date	Team	Score	High points	High rebounds	High assists	Location Attendance	Record
23	4 April	Cairns	L 77–87	Yanni Wetzell (24)	Yanni Wetzell (9)	William McDowell-White (4)	MyState Bank Arena closed event	5–18
24	7 April	@ Perth	L 89–80	Yanni Wetzell (22)	Yanni Wetzell (10)	Peyton Siva (6)	RAC Arena; 10,270	5–19
25	10 April	S.E. Melbourne	L 89–99	Ousmane Dieng (22)	Dieng, Wetzell (6)	Finn Delany (7)	Bendigo Stadium not available	5–20
26	12 April	Sydney	L 70–76	Yanni Wetzell (22)	Yanni Wetzell (14)	McDowell-White, Siva (6)	Bendigo Stadium; 1,543	5–21
27	15 April	Tasmania	L 86–88	Robert Loe (27)	Robert Loe (7)	Hugo Besson (7)	MyState Bank Arena closed event	5–22
28	24 April	Adelaide	L 60–93	Bach, Randle (14)	Robert Loe (10)	Peyton Siva (7)	MyState Bank Arena closed event	5–23

2021–22 season schedule

== Transactions ==
=== Re-signed ===
Player	Signed
Rasmus Bach	23 June
William McDowell-White	26 June
Tai Webster	11 July
Isaac Davidson	28 October

=== Additions ===
Player	Signed	Former team
Ousmane Dieng	2 June	Centre Fédéral
Sam Timmins	30 June	Otago Nuggets
Yanni Wetzell	2 July	South East Melbourne Phoenix
Peyton Siva	22 August	Alba Berlin
Hugo Besson	23 September	Saint-Quentin
Jeremiah Martin	3 October	Cleveland Cavaliers
Princepal Singh	10 November	Stockton Kings
Chasson Randle	15 December	Lakeland Magic
Geremy McKay	8 January	Otago Nuggets
Sam Short	19 February	Melbourne United

=== Subtractions ===
Player	Reason left	New team
Taine Murray	College	Virginia Cavaliers
Colton Iverson	Free agent	Akita Northern Happinets
Corey Webster	Mutual consent	Al Ittihad
Tai Webster	Mutual consent	Žalgiris Kaunas
Levi Randolph	Free agent	Oostende
Jeremiah Martin	Released	BG Göttingen
Yanni Wetzell	Mutual consent	Baskonia
Hugo Besson	NBA draft	N/A
Ousmane Dieng	NBA draft	N/A

== Awards ==
=== Club awards ===
- Club MVP: Yanni Wetzell
- Member MVP: Yanni Wetzell
- Defensive Player: Peyton Siva
- Clubman Award: Tim Maifeleni
- Community Cup: Tony Pompallier

== See also ==
- 2021–22 NBL season
- New Zealand Breakers
