= 2011–12 Sydney Kings season =

Australian basketball club season

- Head coach: Ian Robilliard
- Arena: Sydney Entertainment Centre

NBL results
- Record: 11–17 (39.3%)
- Ladder: 7th
- Finals finish: Did not qualify
- Stats at NBL.com.au

The 2011–12 NBL season was the 23rd season for the Sydney Kings in the NBL.

== Off-season ==
After talk of gaining international superstar, Andrew Bogut, due to the 2011 NBA Lockout, the deal eventually fell through as the club could not pay out his high insurance.

=== Additions ===
Player	Signed	Former Team

== Current squad ==
Sydney Kings roster
Players
Coaches

Pos.	No.	Nat.	Name	Ht.	Wt.
C	0	(New Zealand)	Iti, Martin	2.13 m (7 ft 0 in)	108 kg (238 lb)
G/F	1	(Australia)	Madgen, Ben	1.93 m (6 ft 4 in)	83 kg (183 lb)
PG	2	(Australia)	Martin, Luke	1.82 m (6 ft 0 in)	77 kg (170 lb)
PG	4	(Australia)	Weeks, Jarrad (DP)	1.87 m (6 ft 2 in)	80 kg (176 lb)
F	5	(Australia)	Dann, Graeme	2.02 m (6 ft 8 in)	98 kg (216 lb)
C	6	(Australia)	Khazzouh, Julian (C)	2.09 m (6 ft 10 in)	109 kg (240 lb)
PG	10	(Australia)	Wright, Tom (DP)	1.88 m (6 ft 2 in)	82 kg (181 lb)
G	11	(Australia)	Bruce, Aaron (injured)	1.90 m (6 ft 3 in)	86 kg (190 lb)
SF	12	(Australia)	Gynes, Alex	1.96 m (6 ft 5 in)	98 kg (216 lb)
SF	13	(United States)	Ratzsch, Kevin (I)	2.01 m (6 ft 7 in)	93 kg (205 lb)
PG	14	(Australia)	Cooper, Luke	1.83 m (6 ft 0 in)	75 kg (165 lb)
G	22	(Australia)	White, Kevin (TP)	1.89 m (6 ft 2 in)	85 kg (187 lb)
F/C	25	(Australia)	Kerry, Tanner (DP)	2.06 m (6 ft 9 in)	107 kg (236 lb)
SF	31	(Australia)	Bose, Anatoly	2.00 m (6 ft 7 in)	93 kg (205 lb)
F/C	45	(United States)	Grant, Jerai (I)	2.03 m (6 ft 8 in)	100 kg (220 lb)

Head coach

- (Australia) Shane Heal

Assistant coach(es)

- (Australia) Warren Rosen
- (Australia) Tim Hudson

Strength & conditioning coach(es)

- (Australia) Philip Alleaume

Team manager

- (Australia) Laurie Watterson

Legend

- (C) Team captain
- (DP) Development player
- (I) Import player
- (TP) Training player
- Injured

- Roster
Updated: 24 February 2012

=== Depth chart ===
Pos.	Starting 5	Bench 1	Bench 2	Reserve
C	Julian Khazzouh	Martin Iti
PF	Jerai Grant	Graeme Dann	Tanner Kerry
SF	Anatoly Bose	Alex Gynes		Kevin Ratzsch
SG	Ben Madgen	Jarrad Weeks	Tom Wright	Kevin White
PG	Luke Cooper	Luke Martin		(injured) Aaron Bruce

== Regular season ==
=== Standings ===
Pos	2011–12 NBL season											
Pos	Team	Pld	W	L	PCT	Last 5	Streak	Home	Away	PF	PA	PP
1	New Zealand Breakers	28	21	7	75.00%	4–1	L1	13–1	8–6	2382	2177	109.42%
2	Perth Wildcats	28	19	9	67.86%	3–2	W3	10–4	9–5	2434	2171	112.11%
3	Gold Coast Blaze	28	17	11	60.71%	3–2	W2	10–4	7–7	2387	2253	105.95%
4	Townsville Crocodiles^{1}	28	15	13	53.37%	2–3	L2	11–3	4–10	2213	2210	100.14%
5	Cairns Taipans^{1}	28	15	13	53.37%	2–3	W1	9–5	6–8	2025	2107	96.11%
6	Melbourne Tigers^{2}	28	11	17	39.29%	1–4	L3	7–7	4–10	2156	2239	96.29%
7	Sydney Kings^{2}	28	11	17	39.29%	2–3	L1	5–9	6–8	2279	2423	94.06%
8	Wollongong Hawks	28	9	19	32.14%	3–2	W3	4–10	5–9	2093	2232	93.77%
9	Adelaide 36ers	28	8	20	28.57%	1–4	L4	4–10	4–10	2297	2454	93.60%

Updated to match(es) played on 25 March 2012. Source: NBL.com.au

=== Game log ===
2011–12 game log
October: 2–2 (Home: 1–1; Road: 1–1)

Game	Date	Team	Score	High points	High rebounds	High assists	Location Attendance	Record
1	7 October	@ Melbourne	L 76-82	Julian Khazzouh (18)	Julian Khazzouh (14)	Aaron Bruce (3)	State Netball and Hockey Centre	0-1
2	15 October	New Zealand	L 61-98	Aaron Bruce (13)	Jerai Grant (7)	Aaron Bruce & Luke Cooper (5)	The Kingdome	0-2
3	21 October	@ Adelaide	W 94-71	Julian Khazzouh (26)	Julian Khazzouh (13)	Aaron Bruce (6)	Adelaide Arena	1-2
4	23 October	Wollongong	W 95-89	Anatoly Bose (24)	Jerai Grant (14)	Aaron Bruce (7)	The Kingdome	2-2
5	28 October	@ New Zealand	L 59-76	Julian Khazzouh (16)	Jerai Grant (12)	Aaron Bruce (7)	North Shore Events Centre	2-3

== See also ==
2011–12 NBL season
