= Maker Maker =

South Sudanese footballer (born 1999)

Personal information
- Full name: Maker Marial Maker
- Date of birth: 1 July 1999 (age 27)
- Place of birth: South Sudan
- Positions: Defender; midfielder

Team information
- Current team: Dandenong Thunder

Senior career*
Years	Team	Apps	(Gls)
2015	Trugania Hornets	4	(1)
2016–2017	South Melbourne		
2018	Melbourne Victory Youth	27	(1)
2019–2020	Port Melbourne Sharks	5+	(0+)
2021	Fuenlabrada Promesas	0	(0)
2021	Atmosfera		
2021–2022	TFA Dubai		
2022–2023	Dandenong Thunder		
2024–	Port Melbourne Sharks		

International career
2019–	South Sudan	3	(0)
- * Club domestic league appearances and goals

Maker Marial Maker (born 1 July 1999) is a South Sudanese footballer, who plays as a defender or midfielder for Dandenong Thunder.

== Career ==
Maker started his career with Australian eighth-division side Truganina Hornets. Before the 2016 season, he signed for South Melbourne in the Australian second tier. Before the 2018 season, Maker signed for Australian third-tier club Melbourne Victory Youth. Before the 2019 season, he signed for Port Melbourne Sharks in the Australian second tier.

Before the second half of 2020–21, he signed for Spanish fourth-tier team Fuenlabrada Promesas. In 2021, Maker signed for Atmosfera in the Lithuanian second tier. Before the 2022 season, he signed for Australian second-tier outfit Dandenong Thunder.

== Personal life ==
Maker's parents, who descend from the Dinka people, still live in South Sudan and are also both tall; his father stands 2.03 m (6 ft 8 in) and his mother stands 1.90 m (6 ft 3 in). His brother Thon Maker was drafted at pick 10 in the 2016 NBA draft. Another brother, Matur, attempted to enter the 2018 NBA draft in a manner similar to Thon before deciding to play internationally instead. He has a cousin, Makur, who played basketball in the NBA G League, after having previously played for Howard University. Another cousin, Aliir Aliir, plays in the Australian Football League for Port Adelaide.
