= Alex Gynes =

Australian basketball player

Alexander Gynes
Personal information
- Born: 3 February 1989 (age 37) Nowra, New South Wales, Australia
- Listed height: 196 cm (6 ft 5 in)
- Listed weight: 98 kg (216 lb)

Career information
- High school: Nowra (Nowra, New South Wales)
- College: Radford (2007–2008); Nova Southeastern (2008–2011)
- NBA draft: 2011: undrafted
- Playing career: 2007–2023
- Position: Forward
- Coaching career: 2018–present

Career history

Playing
- 2007: Illawarra Seahawks
- 2011: Central Coast Crusaders
- 2011–2012: Sydney Kings
- 2012–2013: Canberra Gunners
- 2014–2015: Geelong Supercats
- 2016–2019; 2021–2023: Warrnambool Seahawks

Coaching
- 2018: Warrnambool Seahawks (assistant)
- 2021–2023: Warrnambool Seahawks

Career highlights
- Big V D1 champion (2016); Second-team All-SSC (2011)

Alexander Gynes (born 3 February 1989) is an Australian former basketball player and coach.

== Early life ==
Gynes was born in Nowra, New South Wales, and attended Nowra High School. At Nowra High School, Gynes played basketball, rugby, cricket and volleyball, was named Sportsman of the Year in 2004, 2005 and 2006. He played in the 2006 under-18 national basketball tournament and led his New South Wales state team to the gold medal. He averaged 23.6 points and 12.3 rebounds, which included 40 points and 12 rebounds in the semi-finals, followed by 26 points and 20 rebounds in the final, earning the national MVP award. He subsequently selected to represent Australia in the under-19 world junior tournament.

In 2007, Gynes played 14 games for the Illawarra Seahawks in the Waratah League.

== College career ==
Gynes played in 29 games as a freshman for Radford University in 2007–08, averaging 4.0 points and 2.9 rebounds per game.

For his sophomore year, Gynes moved to Nova Southeastern University, where he was limited to 13 games and eight starts due to injury. He averaged 6.2 points and 4.4 rebounds per game in 2008–09.

As a junior in 2009–10, Gynes started in 20 of 27 games played and led the team with 12.7 points and 5.6 free-throws per game. He was subsequently named the NSU Male Athlete of the Year.

As a senior in 2010–11, Gynes averaged 18 points and 8 rebounds per game.

== Professional career ==
Gynes returned to Australia in 2011 and played for the Central Coast Crusaders in the Waratah League. He then signed with the Sydney Kings for the 2011–12 NBL season. In 20 games for the Kings, he averaged 3.0 points and 1.6 rebounds per game.

In 2012 and 2013, Gynes played for the Canberra Gunners in the SEABL. In 41 games over two seasons, he averaged 12.2 points per game.

In 2014 and 2015, Gynes played for the Geelong Supercats in the SEABL. In 50 games over two seasons, he averaged 6.8 points per game.

Between 2016 and 2023, Gynes played for the Warrnambool Seahawks in the Big V Division One. He helped the Seahawks win the championship in 2016, was captain of the team in 2017, and was a player-assistant in 2018. In 2021, 2022 and 2023, he served as player-coach. He suffered a career-ending leg injury in July 2023. He stepped down as coach of the Seahawks following the 2023 season.

== Personal life ==
Gynes is the son of David and Christine Gynes, and has a sister named Ellen.

Gynes' wife, Nicole (née Hunt), is a former professional basketball player. The couple have two children.
