= Matur Maker =

South Sudanese-born Australian basketball player

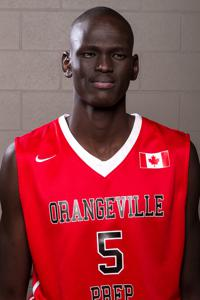
- Maker with Orangeville Prep in 2014

No. 5 – Central Coast Crusaders
- Position: Power forward / center
- League: NBL1 East

Personal information
- Born: 1 January 1998 (age 28) Sudan (now South Sudan)
- Listed height: 208 cm (6 ft 10 in)
- Listed weight: 95 kg (209 lb)

Career information
- High school: Carlisle School (Martinsville, Virginia); Orangeville Prep (Orangeville, Ontario); The TECH Academy (Sault Ste. Marie, Ontario); Mississauga Prep (Mississauga, Ontario)
- NBA draft: 2019: undrafted
- Playing career: 2018–present

Career history
- 2018: Union Neuchâtel
- 2018–2019: Zlatorog Laško
- 2019–2020: Rio Grande Valley Vipers
- 2021–2022: Sydney Kings
- 2022: Canterbury Rams
- 2023: Nelson Giants
- 2024: Taipei Fubon Braves
- 2024: Rockhampton Rockets
- 2024: Al-Ahli Jeddah
- 2026–present: Central Coast Crusaders

Career highlights
- NBL champion (2022); NBL1 North Second Team (2024); BioSteel All-Canadian Game MVP (2017)
- Stats at Basketball Reference

Matur Marial Maker (born 1 January 1998) is a South Sudanese-born Australian basketball player for the Central Coast Crusaders of the NBL1 East. He moved to Australia in his childhood and played for various prep schools in Canada and the United States, before forgoing college basketball. He won an NBL championship with the Sydney Kings in 2022.

== Early life ==
Maker was born in what is now known as South Sudan on 1 January 1998, joining his older brother Thon Maker. In Matur's early childhood, his uncle, a local administrator, helped the family flee to Uganda amid a civil war in their home country. They then settled in Perth, Western Australia as refugees when Maker was four years of age but continued making occasional visits to South Sudan. Matur first started playing soccer at Grayhounds soccer club, a club where many south Sudanese kids played for and alongside his brother Thon. At age 13, Matur was discovered by basketball scout Edward Smith and began living with him in Sydney, before moving to the United States. After his parents were satisfied by the decision, Matur was allowed to join his brother in high school and Smith eventually became their legal guardian.

== High school career ==
Maker began playing high school basketball as a freshman at Carlisle School in Martinsville, Virginia, where he joined Thon, a sophomore, in the middle of the season. His guardian Edward Smith, who the brothers lived with in a two-storey house, was an assistant coach for the team at the time. According to Smith, Matur's arrival at Carlisle helped Thon better acclimate to the United States. During his freshman season, Matur was considered one of the best high school players in the country at the small forward position. He helped Carlisle win a state championship and played with Team Loaded VA of the Amateur Athletic Union (AAU).

For his sophomore year, Maker transferred from Carlisle, with Hopewell Academy in Cary, North Carolina and Orangeville Prep in Orangeville, Ontario as potential destinations. In September 2014, Maker and his brother enrolled at Orangeville Prep, where they played under head coach Larry Blunt and with fellow top prospect Jamal Murray. He was named Ontario Scholastic Basketball Association (OSBA) second-team all-star.

In 2016–17, Maker moved to The Tech Academy in Sault Ste. Marie, Ontario, where he was coached by his guardian Edward Smith and became teammates with cousin Makur Makur. With the Milwaukee Bucks having selected Thon at the 2016 NBA draft, the transfer allowed Matur to live closer to his brother. In April 2017, Maker competed in the BioSteel All-Canadian Basketball Game in Toronto, where he was named most valuable player. In the game, he recorded 25 points and six rebounds, shooting 8-of-11 from the field, playing only 12 minutes. At an adidas Nations event in August, he averaged 26 points and seven rebounds for the Asia Pacific team.

Maker played a postgraduate season of basketball at Mississauga Prep in Mississauga, Ontario for 2017–18. By 2018, he was averaging 25.5 points, 11.3 rebounds, 2.8 assists, 2.1 blocks and 1.7 steals. On 5 January 2018, Maker declared intentions to bypass college and enter the 2018 NBA draft, attempting to follow a similar path as his brother in 2016. He drew attention from scouts on 11 January, when he notched 45 points, 20 rebounds, two blocks and three steals in a 95–85 defeat to GTA Prep. However, due to a lack of attention on his name during the 2018 NBA draft process, he withdrew his name from the 2018 NBA draft on the 11 June international deadline.

College recruiting
Name	Hometown	School	Height	Weight	Commit date
Matur Maker; PF	Orangeville, ON	Mississauga Prep (ON)	6 ft 9.7 in (2.08 m)	193.3 lb (87.7 kg)	—
Matur Maker; PF	Recruit ratings: Rivals: 247Sports: ESPN: (80)				
Overall recruit ranking: 247Sports: 155, 39 (PF)
Note: In many cases, Scout, Rivals, 247Sports, On3, and ESPN may conflict in their listings of height and weight.; In these cases, the average was taken. ESPN grades are on a 100-point scale.; Sources: "2017 Team Ranking". Rivals.

== Professional career ==
=== Union Neuchâtel (2018) ===
On 7 August 2018, Maker signed with Union Neuchâtel of the Swiss Basketball League. In four games, he averaged 5.8 points and 3.8 rebounds per game.

=== Zlatorog Laško (2018–2019) ===
On 30 December 2018, Maker signed with Zlatorog Laško of the Slovenian Basketball League. Maker played 17 games with Zlatorog and averaged 13 ppg, 10 rpg and lead his team to the playoffs.

=== Rio Grande Valley Vipers (2019–2020) ===
On 19 October 2019, Maker signed with the Houston Rockets of the NBA, but was waived the next day. Following this, Maker was added to the roster of the Rockets' NBA G League affiliate, the Rio Grande Valley Vipers.

=== Sydney Kings (2021–2022) ===
Maker joined the Denver Nuggets for the 2021 NBA Summer League.

On 27 August 2021, Maker signed with the Sydney Kings for the 2021–22 NBL season.

=== Canterbury Rams (2022) ===
In May 2022, Maker played three games with the Canterbury Rams during the 2022 New Zealand NBL season.

=== Nelson Giants (2023) ===
On 4 April 2023, Maker signed with the Nelson Giants for the 2023 New Zealand NBL season.

=== Taipei Fubon Braves (2024) ===
In March 2024, Maker had a one-game stint with Taipei Fubon Braves of the P. League+.

=== Rockhampton Rockets (2024) ===
In April 2024, Maker joined the Rockhampton Rockets of the NBL1 North. He was named to the NBL1 North Second Team.

=== Al-Ahli Jeddah (2024) ===
In August 2024, Maker signed with Al-Ahli Jeddah of the Saudi Basketball League. He appeared in three games for Al-Ahli in October 2024.

In January 2025, Maker initially signed with Al-Nasr of the Libyan Division I Basketball League but a week later signed with CS Maristes of the Lebanese Basketball League. He did not play for Maristes.

=== Central Coast Crusaders (2026–present) ===
In April 2026, Maker signed with the Central Coast Crusaders of the NBL1 East for the 2026 season. He helped the team reach the NBL1 East finals for the first time.

== Personal life ==
Maker's parents, who descend from the Dinka people, still live in South Sudan and are also both very tall; his father stands 2.03 m (6 ft 8 in) and his mother stands 1.90 m (6 ft 3 in). His brother, Thon Maker, was drafted at pick 10 in the 2016 NBA draft. Another brother, Maker Maker, plays soccer for South Melbourne FC's under-20 team. He has a cousin, Makur, who currently plays basketball for Capital City Go-Go, after having previously played for Howard University. Another cousin, Aliir Aliir, plays in the Australian Football League for Port Adelaide.
