= Makur Maker =

Australian basketball player (born 2000)

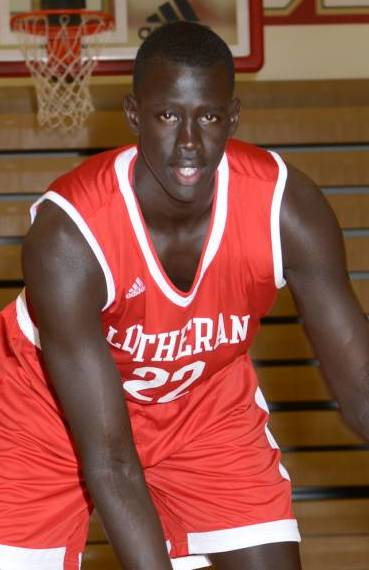
- Maker with Orange Lutheran High School in 2018

No. 44 – Illawarra Hawks
- Position: Center
- League: NBL

Personal information
- Born: 4 November 2000 (age 26) Nairobi, Kenya
- Listed height: 208 cm (6 ft 10 in)
- Listed weight: 107 kg (236 lb)

Career information
- High school: Chaminade College Prep (West Hills, California); The TECH Academy (Sault Ste. Marie, Ontario); Orange Lutheran (Orange, California); Pacific Academy (Irvine, California); Hillcrest Prep (Phoenix, Arizona)
- College: Howard (2020–2021)
- NBA draft: 2022: undrafted
- Playing career: 2021–present

Career history
- 2021–2022: Sydney Kings
- 2022–2023: Capital City Go-Go
- 2023: Liaoning Arctic Wolves
- 2023–2024: Raptors 905
- 2024–2025: Al-Ittihad Jeddah
- 2025: Al Ahli Tripoli
- 2025: Sagesse Club
- 2026: Taipei Taishin Mars
- 2026–present: Illawarra Hawks

Career highlights
- NBL champion (2022)
- Stats at NBA.com
- Stats at Basketball Reference

Makur Maker (born 4 November 2000) is a South Sudanese-Australian professional basketball player for the Illawarra Hawks of the National Basketball League (NBL). Born in Nairobi, Maker grew up in Perth, Western Australia, before playing high school basketball in North America. A consensus five-star recruit, he committed to play college basketball for Howard University, becoming the highest-ranked player in the modern recruiting era to commit to a historically black college or university (HBCU). After one college season, he joined the Sydney Kings for the 2021–22 season and helped them win the NBL championship.

Maker is the cousin of basketball players Thon and Matur Maker.

== Early life ==
Maker was born in Nairobi, Kenya, to South Sudanese parents and immigrated to Perth, Western Australia, when he was one year old. Before focusing on basketball, he mainly took interest in football as a striker and often played beach soccer with his friends. Maker played for Quinns Football club alongside his older brothers. Maker attended St. Andrews Catholic Primary School and joined Irene McCormack Catholic College for high school. He was drawn to basketball in part because of his exceptional height.

== High school career ==
In 2015, Maker moved to the United States and enrolled for his freshman year at Chaminade College Preparatory School in West Hills, Los Angeles. As a result, he was forced to live away from his family for many years. As a freshman, Maker averaged 9.5 points, 8.2 rebounds and 2.5 blocks per game. In 2016, he transferred to The Tech Academy, a prep school in Sault Ste. Marie, Ontario. He was drawn to the program by his cousins, basketball players Thon and Matur Maker. His cousins also brought him under the guidance of Ed Smith, a coach who had helped direct them through their own basketball careers. Maker joined the basketball team with Matur and played in the National Preparatory Association and The Grind Session. In his next year, The Tech Academy closed, and he was homeschooled. Maker suffered a foot injury that sidelined him for the 2017–18 season.

In the summer of 2018, he transferred to Orange Lutheran High School in Orange, California. As a junior, he earned All-Trinity League first team and Orange County Register All-County second team honors. Maker faced eligibility questions entering his senior season, because he had already exhausted his eight semesters of eligibility. Instead of seeking a waiver from the California Interscholastic Federation to continue playing for Orange Lutheran, he transferred to Pacific Academy, a prep school in Irvine, California, and continued his career with the affiliated program, Center of International Basketball Academy. On 17 October 2019, it was announced that he had submitted paperwork to explore his eligibility for the 2020 NBA draft. On 25 April 2020, he declared for the 2020 NBA draft. Despite finishing two credits short of high school graduation, Maker was granted eligibility by the NBA. However, on 3 August he withdrew from the draft to play college basketball.

=== Recruiting ===
Maker was a consensus five-star recruit and one of the top centers in the 2020 recruiting class, according to major recruiting services. On 3 July 2020, he committed to play college basketball for Howard over offers from UCLA, Kentucky and Memphis. He became the highest-ranked recruit to commit to a historically black college or university (HBCU) in the modern recruiting era. Maker made the decision in part to encourage future prospects to play for HBCU programs.

College recruiting
Name	Hometown	School	Height	Weight	Commit date
Makur Maker; C	Perth, Western Australia	Pacific Academy (CA)	6 ft 11 in (2.11 m)	235 lb (107 kg)	Jul 3, 2020
Makur Maker; C	Recruit ratings: Rivals: 247Sports: ESPN: (94)				
Overall recruit ranking: Rivals: 18 247Sports: 18 ESPN: 16
Note: In many cases, Scout, Rivals, 247Sports, On3, and ESPN may conflict in their listings of height and weight.; In these cases, the average was taken. ESPN grades are on a 100-point scale.; Sources: "Howard 2020 Basketball Commitments". Rivals.; "2020 Howard Bison Recruiting Class". ESPN.; "2020 Team Ranking". Rivals.

== College career ==
After playing in Howard's first two games, Maker was ruled out indefinitely on 28 November 2020, due to a groin injury suffered in preseason practice.

== Professional career ==
On 21 August 2021, Maker signed with the Sydney Kings of the National Basketball League (NBL) on a Next Stars contract.

After going undrafted in the 2022 NBA draft, Maker joined the Chicago Bulls for the 2022 NBA Summer League. On 10 August 2022, he signed with the Washington Wizards. He was waived by the Wizards on 12 October and subsequently joined the Capital City Go-Go of the NBA G League for the 2022–23 season.

In July 2023, Maker played for the Philadelphia 76ers in the 2023 NBA Summer League. He also played for the Liaoning Arctic Wolves of the National Basketball League during the 2023 season. He averaged 28.1 points and 11.2 rebounds in 32.8 minutes. On 1 October 2023, Maker signed with the Toronto Raptors, but was waived on 20 October. He subsequently joined Raptors 905 for the 2023–24 NBA G League season.

On 9 September 2024, Maker signed with Al-Ittihad Jeddah of the Saudi Basketball League.

In September 2025, Maker played with Libyan club Al Ahli Tripoli at the 2025 FIBA Intercontinental Cup, where the team won a bronze medal, becoming the first African team in history to finish on the podium. Maker had 20 points and 11 rebounds in the third-place game.

In October 2025, Maker joined Sagesse Club of the Lebanese Basketball League. He left the team in November 2025. On January 16, 2026, Maker signed with the Taipei Taishin Mars of the Taiwan Professional Basketball League (TPBL).

On 1 October 2026, Maker signed with the Illawarra Hawks for the rest of the 2026–27 NBL season.

== National team career ==
In February 2019, Maker stated that he would play for Australia internationally. He made himself available to represent Australia at the 2019 FIBA Under-19 Basketball World Cup but was not selected in the final squad.

== Career statistics ==
Legend
GP	Games played	GS	Games started	MPG	Minutes per game
FG%	Field goal percentage	3P%	3-point field goal percentage	FT%	Free throw percentage
RPG	Rebounds per game	APG	Assists per game	SPG	Steals per game
BPG	Blocks per game	PPG	Points per game	**Bold**	Career high

=== College ===
Year	Team	GP	GS	MPG	FG%	3P%	FT%	RPG	APG	SPG	BPG	PPG
2020–21	Howard	2	2	24.0	.500	.000	.900	6.0	2.0	.0	1.0	11.5

== Personal life ==
Maker is a cousin of basketball players Thon Maker and Matur Maker, and footballer Maker Maker. Makur is also a cousin of Aliir Aliir who plays for Port Adelaide in the Australian Football League. He has six brothers and one sister. Maker descends from the Dinka people in South Sudan. His guardian is Liberian-born basketball coach Ed Smith, who is the same guardian as his cousins Thon and Matur.
