= Yanni Wetzell =

New Zealand-born basketball player

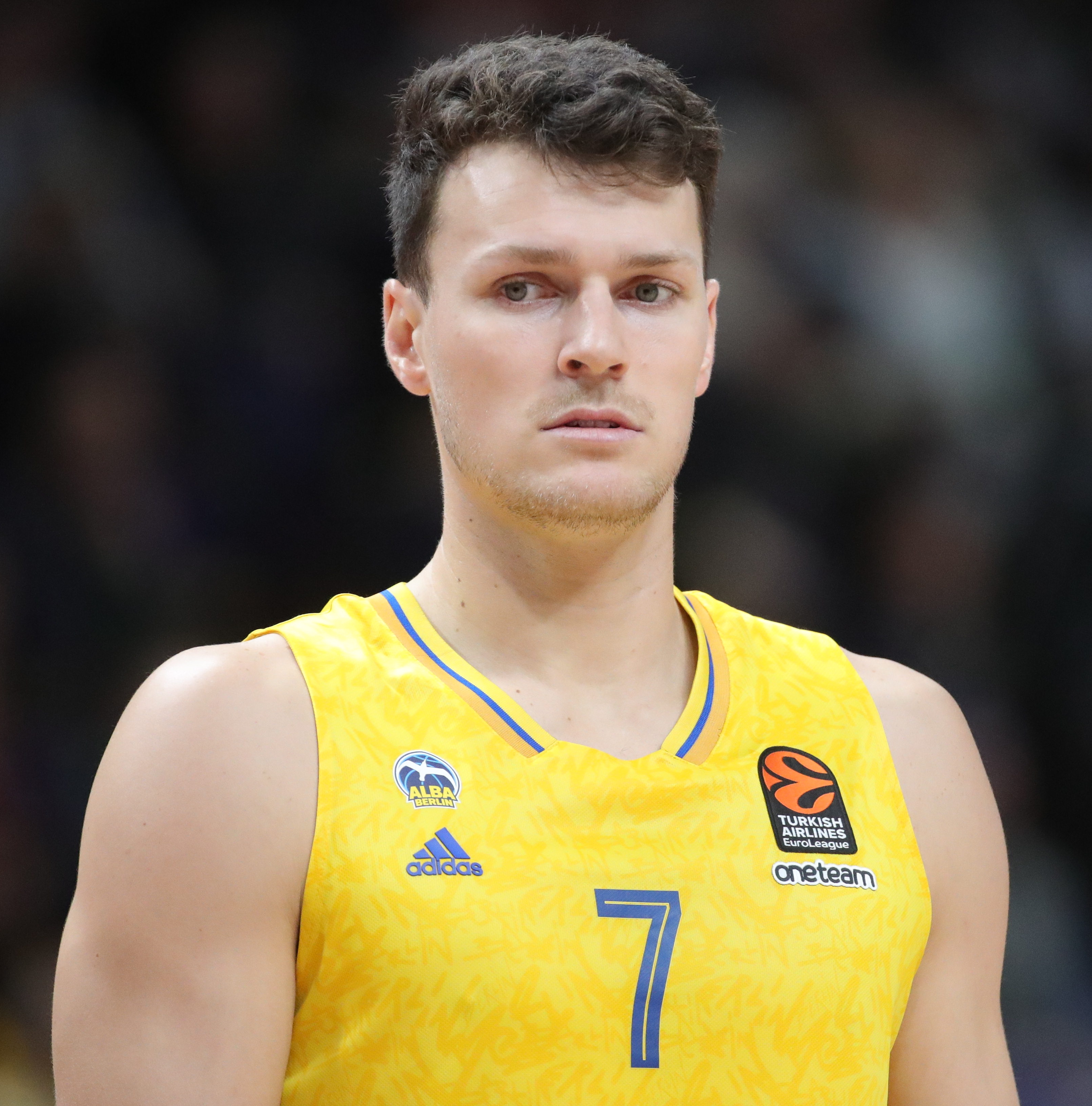
- Wetzell playing for ALBA Berlin (2022)

Akita Northern Happinets
- Position: Center / Power forward
- League: B.League

Personal information
- Born: 8 July 1996 (age 30) Auckland, New Zealand
- Listed height: 6 ft 10 in (2.08 m)
- Listed weight: 240 lb (109 kg)

Career information
- High school: Westlake Boys (Auckland, New Zealand)
- College: St. Mary's (2015–2017); Vanderbilt (2018–2019); San Diego State (2019–2020)
- NBA draft: 2020: undrafted
- Playing career: 2020–present

Career history
- 2020–2021: South East Melbourne Phoenix
- 2021–2022: New Zealand Breakers
- 2022: Baskonia
- 2022–2025: Alba Berlin
- 2025–present: Akita Northern Happinets

Career highlights
- Second-team All-Mountain West (2020); Second-team All-Heartland (2017)

Yannick Clemens Thomas Wetzell (born 8 July 1996) is a New Zealand professional basketball player for Akita Northern Happinets of the Japanese B.League. He played college basketball for the St. Mary's Rattlers, the Vanderbilt Commodores, and the San Diego State Aztecs.

== Early life ==
Wetzell grew up in Auckland, New Zealand. At the age of eight, he played soccer alongside later San Diego State goaltender Cameron Hogg. Wetzell decided to focus on tennis at the age of 13 and achieved a junior national ranking. He attended Westlake Boys High School in Auckland. As a senior in high school, he began playing basketball due to a growth spurt. Wetzell helped lead his team to the 2014 final of the Secondary Schools National Championships, losing to Otago Boys High School. Wetzell did not receive any collegiate offers, so he used an international recruiting agency to connect him to Division II St. Mary's.

== College career ==
As a freshman at St. Mary's, Wetzell averaged 11.7 and 5.6 rebounds per game. He was named Heartland Conference Freshman of the Year. Wetzell averaged 15.5 points and 6.8 rebounds per game as a sophomore. He was named to the Second Team All-Heartland Conference. Following the season, he transferred to Vanderbilt, choosing the Commodores over Purdue, Baylor, and Texas, and sat out a season per NCAA regulations.

As a junior at Vanderbilt, Wetzell made 10 starts and averaged 5.9 points and 3.8 rebounds per game, shooting 49.6 percent from the floor. He was a SEC Academic Honor Roll honoree and earned a degree in economics. The Commodores finished 0–18 in SEC play and coach Bryce Drew was fired.

Wetzell contacted Saint Mary's assistant coach Bubba Meyer to request advice about a graduate transfer. San Diego State coach Brian Dutcher was informed, and after taking an official visit, Wetzell chose the Aztecs over an offer from Texas Tech. He helped replace Jalen McDaniels, who left early to play professionally. Wetzell averaged 11.6 points, 6.5 rebounds and 1.3 assists per game as a senior, and his 59.2% field goal percentage is ninth-highest in Aztec single-season history. He was named to the Second Team All-Mountain West.

== Professional career ==
=== South East Melbourne Phoenix (2020–2021) ===
On 28 July 2020, Wetzell signed his first professional contract with South East Melbourne Phoenix of the National Basketball League. On 16 August 2020, Wetzell exercised the European out clause in his contract and was released by the Phoenix. He signed with Riesen Ludwigsburg of the German Basketball Bundesliga on 19 August, but rejoined the Phoenix on 14 October after experiencing passport complications with his move to Europe. Wetzell averaged 11.2 points and 6.0 rebounds per game.

=== New Zealand Breakers (2021–2022) ===
On 2 July 2021, Wetzell signed a three-year deal with the New Zealand Breakers. He was released from the remainder of his contract on 15 April 2022 under mutual consent. In 22 games, he averaged 17.7 points and 8.2 rebounds per game.

=== Saski Baskonia (2022) ===
On 15 April 2022, Wetzell signed with Saski Baskonia of the Liga ACB until the end of the 2022–23 season.

=== Alba Berlin (2022–2025) ===
On 26 July 2022, Wetzell signed with Alba Berlin of the Basketball Bundesliga.

=== Akita Northern Happinets (2025–present) ===
On 19 July 2025, Wetzell signed with the Akita Northern Happinets of the Japanese B.League.

== National team career ==
In 2017, Wetzell was named to the New Zealand Select Team that played in a tournament in China. He has also competed for the New Zealand U19 Team, also known as the Tall Blacks.

In November 2025, Wetzell was named in the Tall Blacks squad for the first window of the FIBA Basketball World Cup 2027 Asian Qualifiers. In February 2026, he was named in the squad for two more Asian qualifiers.

== Career statistics ==
Legend
GP	Games played	GS	Games started	MPG	Minutes per game
FG%	Field-goal percentage	3P%	3-point field-goal percentage	FT%	Free-throw percentage
RPG	Rebounds per game	APG	Assists per game	SPG	Steals per game
BPG	Blocks per game	PPG	Points per game	PIR	Performance index rating
**Bold**	Career high

=== EuroLeague ===
Year	Team	GP	GS	MPG	FG%	3P%	FT%	RPG	APG	SPG	BPG	PPG	PIR
2022–23	Alba Berlin	**31**	1	12.6	**.519**	—	**.707**	2.8	.5	.3	**.4**	6.5	6.2
2023–24	Alba Berlin	27	**17**	**20.0**	.518	**.200**	.667	**3.5**	**.9**	**.6**	.3	**7.9**	**7.0**
Career		58	18	16.1	.519	.200	.686	3.2	.7	.5	.3	7.2	6.5

=== Domestic leagues ===
Year	Team	League	GP	MPG	FG%	3P%	FT%	RPG	APG	SPG	BPG	PPG
2020–21	(Australia) S.E. Melbourne	NBL	39	26.4	.556	1.000	.623	6.0	1.6	.7	.7	11.2
2021–22	(New Zealand) N. Z. Breakers	NBL	22	32.6	.594	.000	.720	8.4	1.3	1.6	1.0	17.7
2021–22	(Spain) Baskonia	ACB	11	12.6	.500	—	.667	2.9	.4	—	.1	3.6
2022–23	(Germany) Alba Berlin	BBL	31	17.9	.599	.000	.775	3.4	1.3	.7	.6	9.2
2023–24	(Germany) Alba Berlin	BBL	38	19.3	.622	.200	.677	3.7	1.4	.5	.3	8.9

=== College ===
==== NCAA Division I ====
Year	Team	GP	GS	MPG	FG%	3P%	FT%	RPG	APG	SPG	BPG	PPG
2017–18	Vanderbilt	Redshirt										
2018–19	Vanderbilt	**32**	10	18.5	.496	.265	**.763**	3.8	.3	.7	**.6**	5.9
2019–20	San Diego State	**32**	**32**	**27.8**	**.592**	**.318**	.642	**6.5**	**1.3**	**.8**	**.6**	**11.6**
Career		64	42	23.2	.559	.286	.688	5.2	.8	.7	.6	8.8

==== NCAA Division II ====
Year	Team	GP	GS	MPG	FG%	3P%	FT%	RPG	APG	SPG	BPG	PPG
2015–16	St. Mary's	29	29	25.1	**.530**	**.500**	.632	5.6	.9	.3	.3	11.7
2016–17	St. Mary's	**30**	**30**	**31.3**	.501	.409	**.667**	**6.8**	**1.5**	**.8**	**.6**	**15.5**
Career		59	59	28.3	.514	.420	.654	6.2	1.2	.6	.4	13.6

== Personal life ==
Wetzell is of Samoan and German descent. He is the son of Jenny and Clem Wetzell, who travelled to see him play 12 games at San Diego State. He is the younger brother of television journalist and presenter Pippa Wetzell.
