= Kevin White (basketball) =

Australian basketball player (born 1987)

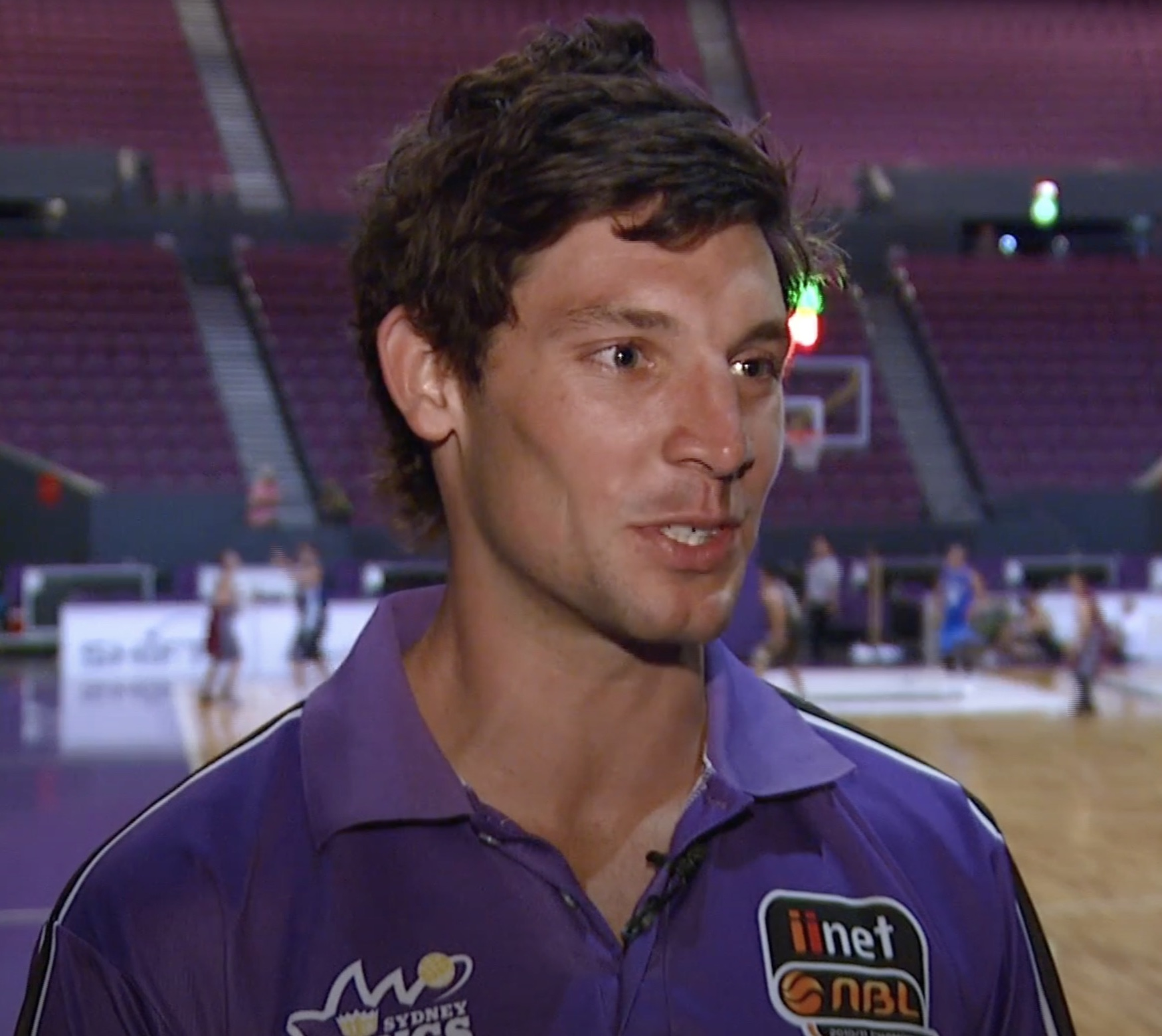
- White with the Sydney Kings in 2011

Personal information
- Born: 7 April 1987 (age 39) Manly, New South Wales, Australia
- Listed height: 187 cm (6 ft 2 in)
- Listed weight: 90 kg (198 lb)

Career information
- High school: Scots College (Sydney, New South Wales)
- College: Alaska Anchorage (2007–2010)
- NBA draft: 2011: undrafted
- Playing career: 2007–2023
- Position: Guard

Career history
- 2007, 2009–2011: Manly Warringah Sea Eagles
- 2010–2011: Sydney Kings
- 2012: Ballarat Miners
- 2012–2015: Sydney Kings
- 2013–2014: Manly Warringah Sea Eagles
- 2015: Hobart Chargers
- 2015–2019: Illawarra Hawks
- 2016–2017: Bendigo Braves
- 2018: Rockingham Flames
- 2019: Manly Warringah Sea Eagles
- 2019–2020: Adelaide 36ers
- 2020–2022: Perth Wildcats
- 2022: Northside Wizards
- 2022–2023: Illawarra Hawks

Career highlights
- NBL Cup winner (2021); SEABL champion (2016); 2× Waratah League champion (2010, 2013); Waratah League MVP (2019)

Kevin David White (born 7 April 1987) is an Australian former professional basketball player who played 12 seasons in the National Basketball League (NBL).

== High school career ==
White attended Scots College in Sydney, and was a member of its 2004 premiership winning basketball team. He was named the New South Wales High School Basketballer of the Year during his senior year in 2005.

== College career ==
White redshirted his freshman season while attending San Diego Christian College to recover from a shoulder injury during the 2006–07 season. He transferred to the University of Alaska Anchorage to play for the Seawolves, with whom he played for three seasons.

== Professional career ==
White began his professional career as a development player with the Sydney Kings during the 2010–11 NBL season. Following a season with the Ballarat Miners of the South East Australian Basketball League (SEABL) in 2012, White returned to the Sydney Kings on a full contract. He was named the club's Best Defensive Player during his third and final season with the Kings in 2014–15. During the 2015 NBL offseason, he returned to the SEABL to play for the Hobart Chargers.

On 15 July 2015, White signed with the Illawarra Hawks of the NBL. It marked a reunion with head coach Rob Beveridge, who coached White during his junior career. White served as team captain during his final two seasons with the team. He spent the 2016 and 2018 NBL offseasons in the SEABL with the Bendigo Braves and the Rockingham Flames respectively. Illawarra elected not to resign White following the 2018–19 NBL season to focus on the development of their younger players.

On 16 May 2019, White signed with the Adelaide 36ers of the NBL. He was named the team's co-captain alongside Brendan Teys for the 2019–20 NBL season. On 15 April 2020, White was released by the 36ers.

On 6 August 2020, White signed with the Perth Wildcats for the 2020–21 NBL season. On 18 August 2021, he re-signed with the Wildcats for the 2021–22 NBL season.

On 17 September 2022, White signed with the Illawarra Hawks as an injury replacement player ahead of the 2022–23 NBL season. He played his 300th NBL game the following month. He retired following the 2022–23 season.

== Personal life ==
White and his wife Rachael have two children.

In January 2024, White joined the Illawarra Hawks as general manager of community.
