= Aliir Aliir =

Australian rules footballer

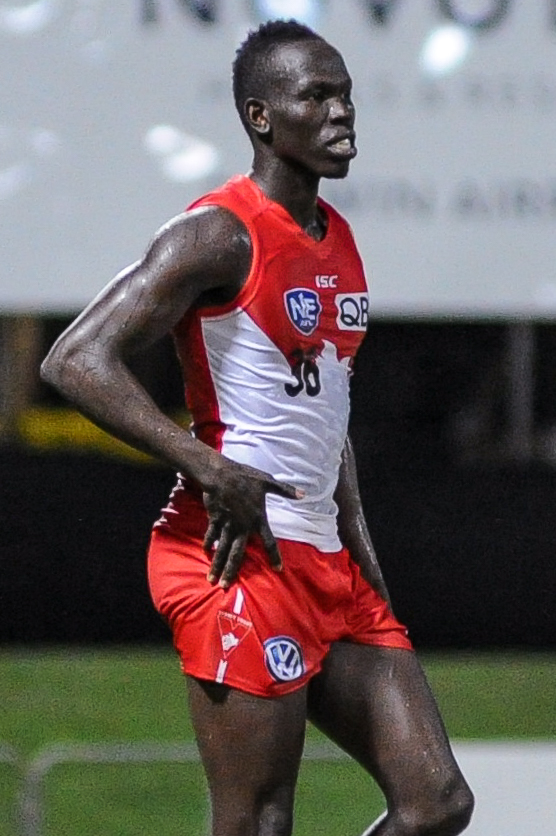
- Aliir playing for Sydney in 2017

Personal information
- Full name: Aliir Mayom Aliir
- Born: 5 September 1994 (age 32); Kakuma, Kenya
- Original team: Aspley (NEAFL)/East Fremantle (WAFL)
- Draft: No. 44, 2013 national draft
- Height: 194 cm (6 ft 4 in)
- Weight: 96 kg (212 lb)
- Position: Key defender

Club information
- Current club: Port Adelaide
- Number: 21

Playing career^{1}
| Years | Club | Games (Goals) |
| 2014–2020 | Sydney | 64 (5) |
| 2021– | Port Adelaide | 136 (2) |
| Total | | 200 (7) |
- ^{1} Playing statistics correct to the end of 2026.

Career highlights
- All-Australian team: 2021; 2× Bruce Weber Memorial Trophy (3rd PAFC B&F): 2021, 2024; Showdown Medal: 2021 (round 21)

Aliir Mayom Aliir (born 5 September 1994) is a professional Australian rules footballer playing for the Port Adelaide Football Club in the Australian Football League (AFL). He formerly played for the Sydney Swans. As of May 2026, Aliir has the most games played by an AFL player of South Sudanese descent.

== Early life and career ==
Aliir Aliir was born in the Kakuma refugee camp in Kenya to South Sudanese parents who had fled the Sudanese civil war. His family moved to Australia when he was eight years of age, eventually settling in Brisbane. After learning to kick a football at Kedron State High School, he was invited by a friend to play Australian rules football for the Aspley Hornets as a 14-year-old. Within a few years, he had made the Queensland side and was invited to play for the world XVIII at the under-16 championships in Sydney. It was during this trip that Aliir discovered he had a long-lost sister trying to contact him.

In 2012, Aliir's mother, brothers and sisters moved to Perth to reunite with extended family. Aliir decided to remain in Brisbane, and that year, he made his debut in the NEAFL for Aspley. Aliir made his mark as a ruckman in 2012 while playing for the Hornets and the Queensland Under-18 Scorpions. He was also a member of the Brisbane Lions Academy for two years while based in Queensland.

After being overlooked in the 2012 AFL draft, Aliir made the decision to relocate to Perth to live with his family. There he joined the East Fremantle Football Club and spent the 2013 season playing for the club's Colts team. With East Fremantle, he was converted from a ruckman to a defender.

== AFL career ==
=== Sydney (2014–2020) ===
Aliir was drafted by the Sydney Swans at pick 44 in the 2013 AFL draft, becoming the first player of Sudanese heritage taken in the National Draft. Aliir had a promising debut season with the Swans reserves in the NEAFL. He suffered a dislocated shoulder mid-season, and was ruled out for the remainder of the year in round 16, which resulted in him missing the team's 2014 NEAFL finals campaign.

After a slow start, 2015 was another solid year of development in the NEAFL for Aliir, playing mainly as a key defender. Aliir played 16 games and averaged 16 possessions at more than 80 per cent efficiency and took the most marks (86) for the Swans reserves. Heading into the 2016 AFL season, Aliir was in line to take over from Ted Richards in Sydney's defence.

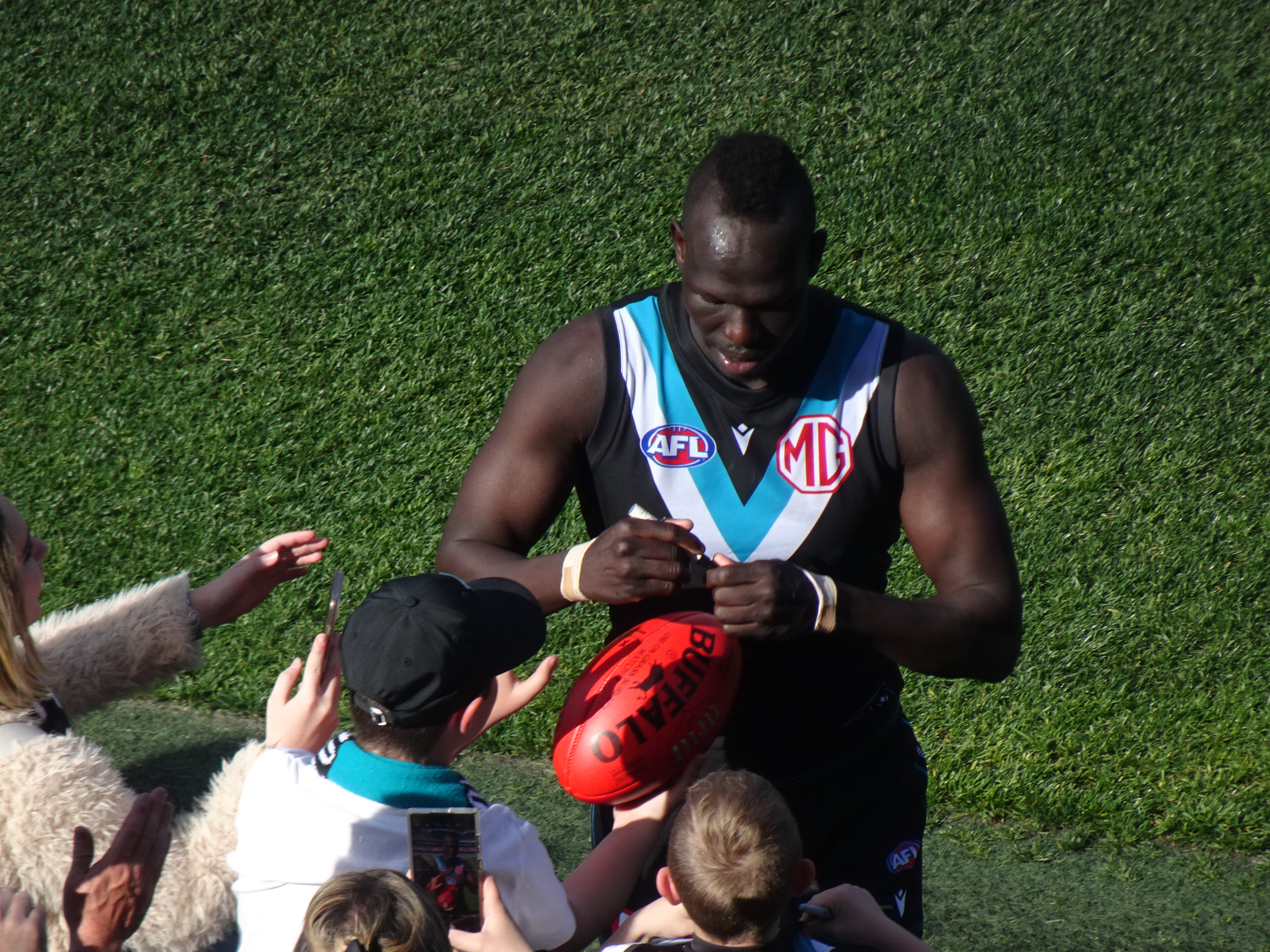
Aliir with Port Adelaide signs a fan's football during the 2023 AFL season

Aliir made his long-awaited AFL debut against the Brisbane Lions at the Gabba in Round 6, 2016. He quickly cemented his place in the team after round 16, as he played in every match between then and the Swans' preliminary final match. However, in the preliminary final, Aliir suffered a low-grade medial strain late in the first quarter of their win over Geelong. The injury consequently ruled him out of the Grand Final. The Swans went on to lose the Grand Final by 22 points to the Western Bulldogs.

Following the 2020 AFL season, Aliir was traded to Port Adelaide on a four-year deal.

=== Port Adelaide (2021–) ===
In Round 4 of the 2023 AFL season, Aliir saved the game for Port Adelaide against his former team, Sydney, by spoiling a shot after the siren from former teammate Oliver Florent that was going in. It ended with Port Adelaide winning by two points.

== Personal ==
Aliir's younger half-brother, Akech, plays for South East Melbourne Phoenix in the National Basketball League. He is the cousin of Matur Maker who plays for the Rio Grande Valley Vipers of the NBA G League and Thon Maker, who last played for the Cleveland Cavaliers of the NBA.

== Statistics ==
Updated to the end of round 22, 2026.

Legend
| G | Goals | K | Kicks | D | Disposals | T | Tackles |
| B | Behinds | H | Handballs | M | Marks |

| Season | Team | No. | Games | Totals | | | | | | | Averages (per game) | | | | | | | Votes |
| Season | Team | No. | Games | G | B | K | H | D | M | T | G | B | K | H | D | M | T | Votes |
|---|---|---|---|---|---|---|---|---|---|---|---|---|---|---|---|---|---|---|
| 2016 | Sydney | 36 | 13 | 0 | 0 | 103 | 84 | 187 | 56 | 31 | 0.0 | 0.0 | 7.9 | 6.5 | 14.4 | 4.3 | 2.4 | 0 |
| 2017 | Sydney | 36 | 3 | 0 | 0 | 20 | 15 | 35 | 11 | 9 | 0.0 | 0.0 | 6.7 | 5.0 | 11.7 | 3.7 | 3.0 | 0 |
| 2018 | Sydney | 36 | 12 | 1 | 1 | 121 | 74 | 195 | 91 | 13 | 0.1 | 0.1 | 10.1 | 6.2 | 16.3 | 7.6 | 1.1 | 3 |
| 2019 | Sydney | 36 | 22 | 1 | 0 | 222 | 124 | 346 | 104 | 44 | 0.0 | 0.0 | 10.1 | 5.6 | 15.7 | 4.7 | 2.0 | 0 |
| 2020 (Note: The 2020 season was played with 17 home-and-away matches per team (down from 22) and 16-minute quarters with time on (down from 20-minute quarters with time on) due to the impact of the COVID-19 pandemic.) | Sydney | 36 | 14 | 3 | 1 | 78 | 57 | 135 | 45 | 22 | 0.2 | 0.1 | 5.6 | 4.1 | 9.6 | 3.2 | 1.6 | 0 |
| 2021 | Port Adelaide | 21 | 24 | 0 | 1 | 268 | 100 | 368 | 156 | 37 | 0.0 | 0.0 | 11.2 | 4.2 | 15.3 | 6.5 | 1.5 | 7 |
| 2022 | Port Adelaide | 21 | 19 | 0 | 1 | 179 | 74 | 253 | 92 | 30 | 0.0 | 0.1 | 9.4 | 3.9 | 13.3 | 4.8 | 1.6 | 0 |
| 2023 | Port Adelaide | 21 | 24 | 0 | 0 | 202 | 81 | 283 | 121 | 37 | 0.0 | 0.0 | 8.4 | 3.4 | 11.8 | 5.0 | 1.5 | 3 |
| 2024 | Port Adelaide | 21 | 25 | 0 | 0 | 271 | 86 | 357 | 161 | 34 | 0.0 | 0.0 | 10.8 | 3.4 | 14.3 | 6.4 | 1.4 | 0 |
| 2025 | Port Adelaide | 21 | 22 | 1 | 0 | 215 | 75 | 290 | 130 | 29 | 0.0 | 0.0 | 9.8 | 3.4 | 13.2 | 5.9 | 1.3 | 1 |
| 2026 | Port Adelaide | 21 | 21 | 1 | 1 | 261 | 67 | 328 | 169 | 23 | 0.0 | 0.0 | 12.4 | 3.2 | 15.6 | 8.0 | 1.1 | 0 |
| Career | | | 199 | 7 | 5 | 1940 | 837 | 2777 | 1136 | 309 | 0.0 | 0.0 | 9.7 | 4.2 | 14.0 | 5.7 | 1.6 | 14 |
