= Hugo Besson =

French basketball player (born 2001)

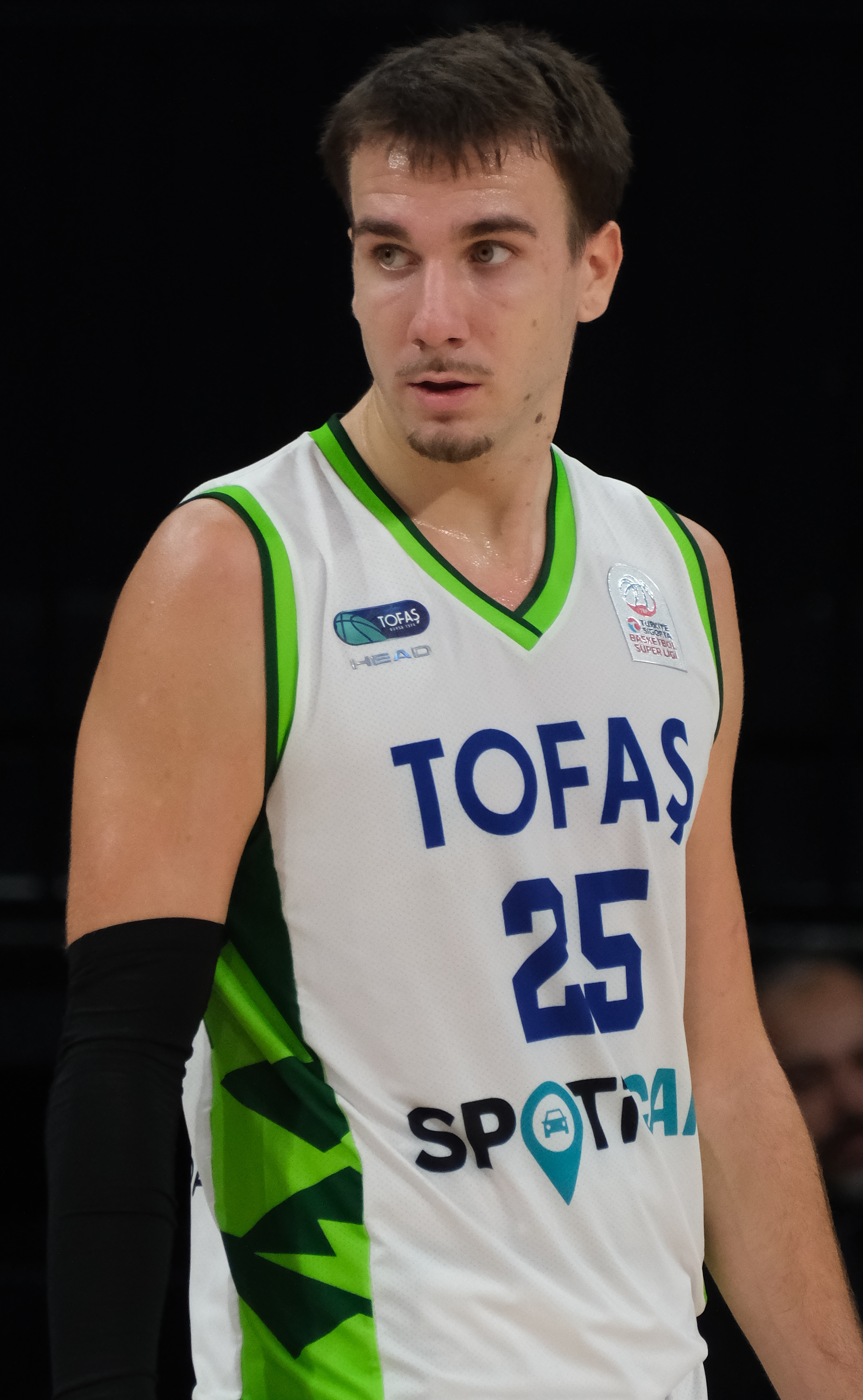
- Besson with Tofaş in 2025

No. 25 – ASVEL
- Position: Shooting guard / point guard
- League: LNB Élite; EuroLeague

Personal information
- Born: 26 April 2001 (age 25) Angers, France
- Listed height: 194 cm (6 ft 4 in)
- Listed weight: 89 kg (196 lb)

Career information
- NBA draft: 2022: 2nd round, 58th overall pick
- Drafted by: Indiana Pacers
- Playing career: 2018–present

Career history
- 2018–2021: Élan Chalon
- 2020–2021: →Saint-Quentin BB
- 2021–2022: New Zealand Breakers
- 2022–2023: Metropolitans 92
- 2023–2024: FMP
- 2024: Varese
- 2024–2025: Manisa
- 2025–2026: Tofaş
- 2026–present: ASVEL

Career highlights
- LNB Pro B All-Star Five (2021); LNB Pro B Best Youngster (2021); LNB Pro B Best Scorer (2021); No. 25 retired by Saint-Quentin BB
- Stats at Basketball Reference

Hugo Eric Besson (born 26 April 2001) is a French professional basketball player for ASVEL of the French LNB Élite and the EuroLeague. He debuted in the LNB Pro A in 2018 with Élan Chalon. After two seasons with Chalon, he was loaned to Saint-Quentin BB of the LNB Pro B and led the league in scoring in the 2020–21 season. After a season with the New Zealand Breakers in the Australian NBL, he was drafted by the Indiana Pacers with the 58th overall pick in the 2022 NBA draft.

== Early life and career ==
Besson was born in Angers, France. He grew up in the Côte d'Azur town of Bandol. He started his youth basketball career in 2016 as a member of the Antibes Sharks. He averaged 5.1 points in 15 games with the Under 21 team during the 2016–17 season. He joined Élan Chalon in 2017 and played for the Under 21 team. In 27 games during the 2017–18 season, he averaged 10.2 points, 3.6 rebounds, 1.1 assists, and 1.0 steals per game.

== Professional career ==
=== Élan Chalon (2018–2021) ===
Between 2018 and 2020, Besson was a member of the Élan Chalon senior squad. He played 14 games in the LNB Pro A over two seasons. In the ProA U21 competition, he averaged 18.6 points, 5.8 rebounds, 4.0 assists, and 2.1 steals in 28 games during the 2018–19 season, and 26.0 points, 4.3 rebounds, 4.0 assists, and 2.0 steals in six games during the 2019–20 season.

In June 2020, Besson signed a three-year contract with Élan Chalon and was subsequently loaned to Saint-Quentin BB of the LNB Pro B. He led the league in scoring during the 2020–21 season with 19.5 points per game. He also averaged 4.3 rebounds, 2.9 assists, and 1.0 steals in 26 games. He was nominated for league MVP and earned all-star five and best youngster. His No. 25 jersey was later retired by Saint-Quentin BB.

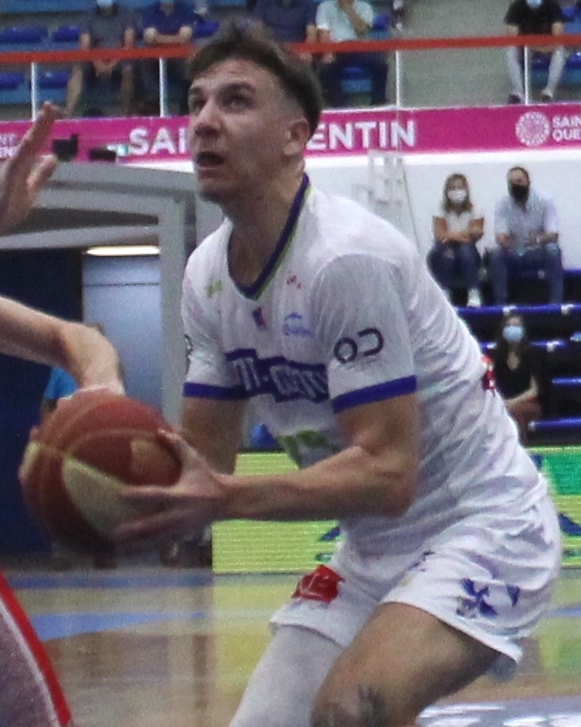
Besson with Saint-Quentin BB in 2021

=== 2021 off-season ===
Besson was courted by several European clubs during 2021, including Baskonia and ASVEL, and was in the running for the NBA draft. He withdrew his name from the draft after being unable to participate in work-outs due to an ankle injury. In August 2021, he was ranked by ESPN as the 35th top prospect for the 2022 NBA draft.

=== New Zealand Breakers (2021–2022) ===
On 23 September 2021, Besson signed with the New Zealand Breakers of the Australian National Basketball League (NBL) for the 2021–22 season. In his debut for the Breakers on 4 December, he scored 10 points in an 89–65 season-opening loss to the South East Melbourne Phoenix. He scored 20 or more points in each of the next three games. He had two 20-point games in March 2022. Besson left the Breakers on 17 April 2022 in order to prepare for the NBA draft. In 25 games, he averaged 13.9 points, 3.9 rebounds, and 2.5 assists per game.

=== Metropolitans 92 (2022–2023) ===
On 13 August 2022, Besson signed with Metropolitans 92 of the LNB Pro A. He was sidelined between 9 January and 16 May with a hip injury. His minutes decreased after returning from injury, as he helped the team reach the Pro A finals, where they lost 3–0 to Monaco. Besson played just five minutes from the bench in the game three defeat. In 25 games, he averaged 9.2 points, 2.2 rebounds and 2.1 assists per game.

Besson re-joined the Milwaukee Bucks for the 2023 NBA Summer League.

=== FMP (2023–2024) ===
On 30 September 2023, Besson signed a two-year deal with FMP of the Basketball League of Serbia and the Adriatic League. However, on 11 February 2024, he parted ways with the club.

=== Openjobmetis Varese (2024) ===
On 26 February 2024, Besson signed with Openjobmetis Varese of the Lega Basket Serie A.

=== Manisa Basket (2024–2025) ===
On 4 September 2024, Besson signed with Manisa Basket of the Basketbol Süper Ligi (BSL). He averaged 16.6 points, 3.6 rebounds, and 2.9 assists in 29 games in the BSL during the 2024–25 season; and 17.2 points, 4.1 rebounds, 3.2 assists, and 1.4 steals in 14 games in the Basketball Champions League (BCL).

=== Tofaş (2025–2026) ===
On 15 July 2025, Besson signed with Tofaş of the BSL, returning to the league for a second stint.

=== ASVEL (2026–present) ===
On 22 August 2026, Besson signed with LDLC ASVEL of the French LNB Élite and the EuroLeague.

=== NBA draft rights and Summer League ===
Besson was selected with the 58th overall pick in the 2022 NBA draft by the Indiana Pacers. His draft rights were then immediately traded to the Milwaukee Bucks. He joined the Bucks for the 2022 NBA Summer League.

On 6 February 2025, Besson's draft rights were traded to the New York Knicks in a multi-team trade.

== National team career ==
In June 2021, Besson was called up to the French Under 20 national team ahead of the FIBA U20 European Challengers. He ultimately did not play with the final team.

== Personal life ==
Besson's father, uncle, and grandfather have all played and coached professional basketball. He has a sister named Jade.
