= Central Coast Crusaders =

- Leagues: NBL1 East
- Founded: 2006
- History: Men: Central Coast Crusaders; 2006–present Women: Central Coast Crusaders; 2018–present
- Arena: Breakers Indoor Sports Stadium
- Location: Central Coast, New South Wales
- Team colors: Red, blue, gold
- General manager: Matt Tredrea
- Championships: 1 (2019) (M); 0 (W)
- Website: NBL1.com.au

Central Coast Crusaders is a NBL1 East club based in Central Coast, New South Wales. The club fields a team in both the Men's and Women's NBL1 East. The Crusaders play their home games at Breakers Indoor Sports Stadium.

== Club history ==
Prior to 2006, a club known as Central Coast Power hosted both a men's and women's team in the Waratah League. For the 2006 season, the Power departed and in came a new men's team known as the Central Coast Crusaders.

In 2016, the Crusaders were coached by former Sydney Kings player and coach, Ian Robilliard.

In 2018, a Crusaders women's team entered the Waratah League for the first time.

In 2019, the Crusaders men's team won their first Waratah League championship, defeating the Manly Warringah Sea Eagles 74–72 in the grand final.

In 2020, the Crusaders women's team lost in the grand final to the Norths Bears.

The Waratah League was rebranded as NBL1 East for the 2022 season.

In 2025, the Crusaders women finished with a league-worst 1–19 record, their worst season to date.
