= Finn Delany =

New Zealand basketball player

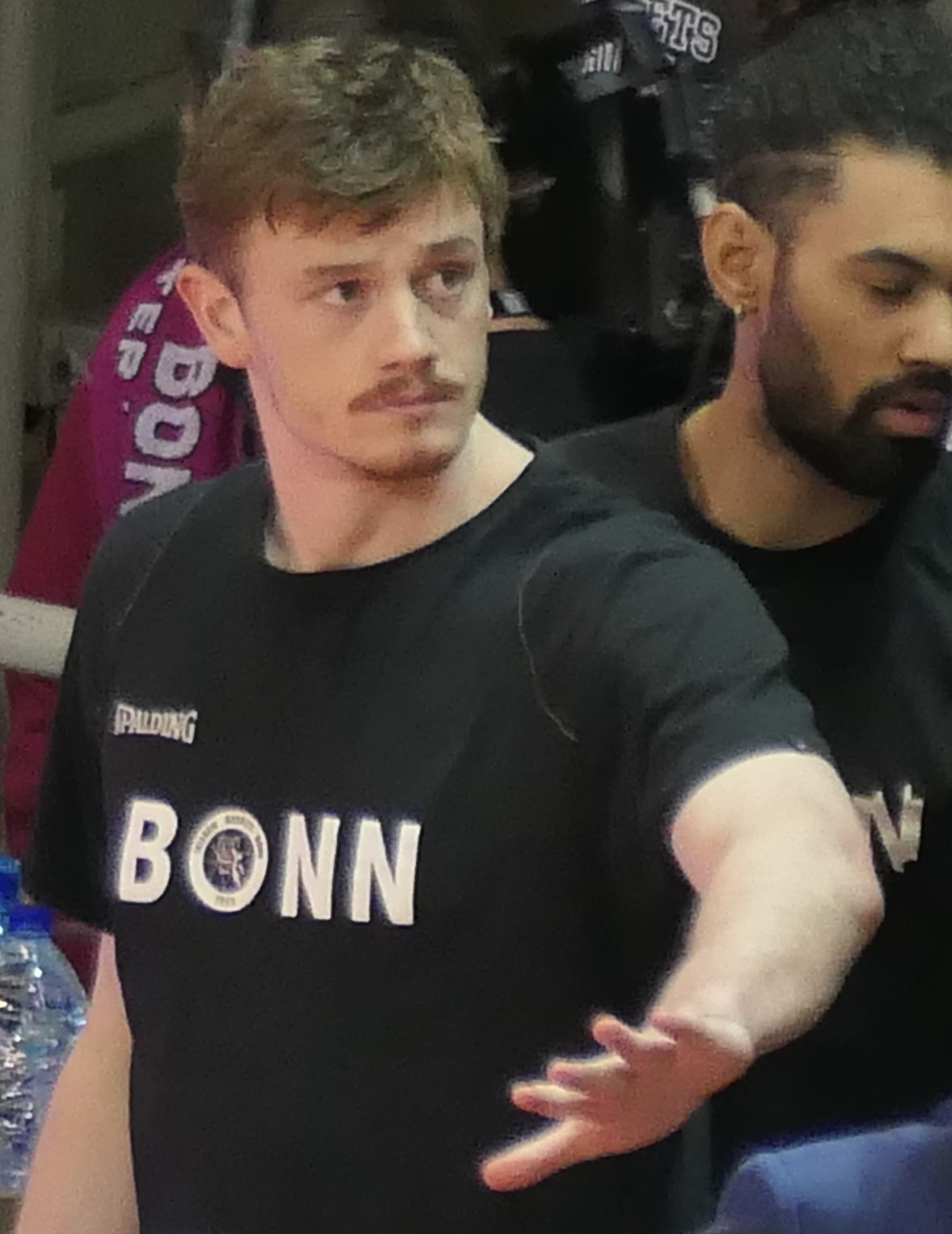
- Delany with Bonn in 2023

No. 7 – Ibaraki Robots
- Position: Forward
- League: B.League

Personal information
- Born: 12 August 1995 (age 31) Wellington, New Zealand
- Listed height: 200 cm (6 ft 7 in)
- Listed weight: 107 kg (236 lb)

Career information
- High school: Nelson College (Nelson, New Zealand)
- College: Southwest Baptist (2014–2015)
- NBA draft: 2016: undrafted
- Playing career: 2013–present

Career history
- 2013–2018: Nelson Giants
- 2015–2022: New Zealand Breakers
- 2019: FMP
- 2022–2023: Telekom Baskets Bonn
- 2023–2024: New Zealand Breakers
- 2024: Basket Zaragoza
- 2024–2025: Veltex Shizuoka
- 2025: Utsunomiya Brex
- 2025–2026: Melbourne United
- 2026–present: Ibaraki Robots

Career highlights
- Basketball Champions League Asia champion (2025); Basketball Champions League Asia All-Star Five (2025); Champions League champion (2023); All-NBL Second Team (2021); NZNBL Most Outstanding Forward (2018); NZNBL Most Outstanding Kiwi Forward/Centre (2018); NZNBL All-Star Five (2018)
Medals
Men's basketball
Representing New Zealand
Commonwealth Games
| Bronze medal – third place | 2018 Gold Coast | Team competition |

Finn Delany (born 12 August 1995) is a New Zealand-Irish professional basketball player for the Ibaraki Robots of the Japanese B.League. He played college basketball for the Southwest Baptist Bearcats.

== Early life ==
Delany was born in Wellington, New Zealand.

== Professional career ==
=== Nelson Giants and New Zealand Breakers (2013–2022) ===
Delany debuted in the New Zealand NBL in 2013 with the Nelson Giants. He continued playing for the team until 2018, when in that season, he was named NZNBL Most Outstanding Forward, NZNBL Most Outstanding Kiwi Forward/Centre and NZNBL All-Star Five.

Delany played for the New Zealand Breakers of the Australian NBL between 2015 and 2022. In the 2020–21 NBL season, he was named to the All-NBL Second Team.

=== FMP (2019) ===
In February 2019, Delany signed a contract with Serbian team FMP for the rest of the 2018–19 season. His best showing for the club came against EuroLeague team Crvena zvezda on 4 May 2019 when he had 18 points, 4 rebounds and 3 assists on 89% field goal shooting.

=== NBA Summer League (2019) ===
In July 2019, Delany joined the Dallas Mavericks for the 2019 NBA Summer League. He averaged 6.3 points, 2 rebounds and 1.3 assists in 10 minutes per game.

=== Telekom Baskets Bonn (2022–2023) ===
On 12 July 2022, Delany signed with Telekom Baskets Bonn of the German Basketball Bundesliga and the Basketball Champions League. They went on to win the Champions League title and finished as Bundesliga runners-up.

=== New Zealand Breakers and Basket Zaragoza (2023–2024) ===
On 13 July 2023, Delany signed a two-year deal with the New Zealand Breakers. His court time was limited in the 2023–24 NBL season due to a calf injury. He parted ways with the Breakers after one season.

On 7 March 2024, Delany signed with Basket Zaragoza of the Liga ACB for the rest of the 2023–24 season.

=== Veltex Shizuoka (2024–2025) ===
On June 17, 2024, Delany signed with Veltex Shizuoka of the Japanese B.League for the 2024–25 B2 League season.

=== Utunomiya Brex (2025) ===
Delany joined Utsunomiya Brex of the B.League for the 2025 Basketball Champions League Asia.

=== Melbourne United (2025–2026) ===
On 22 May 2025, Delany signed a two-year deal with Melbourne United, with the second year being a mutual option. On 5 March 2026, in the Play-In Qualifier, Delany scored a season-high 33 points in an 82–68 win over the Tasmania JackJumpers. The second year of his two-year deal was not exercised following the season. In 33 games during the 2025–26 NBL season, he averaged 11.4 points, 5.6 rebounds and 2.3 assists per game.

=== Ibaraki Robots (2026–present) ===
On 8 June 2026, Delany signed with the Ibaraki Robots of the B.League.

== National team career ==
Delany was a member of the New Zealand national team that won 4th place at the 2017 FIBA Asia Cup in Beirut, Lebanon. Over six tournament games, he averaged 12.7 points, 7.0 rebounds and 0.8 assists per game. He was a Tall Blacks member who won the bronze medal at the 2018 Commonwealth Games.

In November 2017, 2018, and February 2019, Delany represented the Tall Blacks during the 2019 FIBA Basketball World Cup qualifiers. Over nine qualifiers games, he averaged 7.2 points, 3.8 rebounds and 1.1 assists per game.

In May 2025, Delany returned to the Tall Blacks for a trans-Tasman series against Australia.

In November 2025, Delany was named in the Tall Blacks squad for the first window of the FIBA Basketball World Cup 2027 Asian Qualifiers.

== Career statistics ==
=== NBL ===
| Year | MPG | FG% | 3P% | FT% | RPG | APG | SPG | BPG | PPG |
|---|---|---|---|---|---|---|---|---|---|
| 2020–21 | 33.49 | 46 | 34 | 83 | 6.8 | 2.2 | 0.56 | 0.33 | 16.22 |
| 2019–20 | 29.31 | 47 | 40 | 81 | 6 | 2 | 0.55 | 0.35 | 12.35 |
| 2018–19 | 14.95 | 57 | 39 | 69 | 2.76 | 1.32 | 0.28 | 0.08 | 8.04 |
| 2017–18 | 14.96 | 50 | 22 | 66 | 3.36 | 0.82 | 0.36 | 0.18 | 5.18 |
| 2016–17 | 8.92 | 53 | 47 | 74 | 2.24 | 0.52 | 0.16 | 0.04 | 3.24 |
| 2015–16 | 2.33 | 0 | 0 | — | 1 | 0.33 | 0 | 0 | 0 |

== Personal life ==
Delany is a dual national of New Zealand and Ireland.

== See also ==
- List of foreign basketball players in Serbia
