= 2022–23 Illawarra Hawks season =

Australian basketball club season

- Head coach: (Australia) Jacob Jackomas
- Co-captains: (Australia) Sam Froling (United States) Tyler Harvey
- Arena: Wollongong Entertainment Centre

NBL results
- Record: 3–25 (10.7%)
- Ladder: 10th
- Finals finish: Did not qualify
- Stats at NBL.com.au

Player records
- Points: (United States) Harvey 18.9
- Rebounds: (Australia) Froling 8.0
- Assists: (United States) Siva 6.3
- All statistics correct as of 4 February 2023.

The 2022–23 Illawarra Hawks season was the 45th season of the franchise in the National Basketball League (NBL), and their first under the leadership of their new head coach Jacob Jackomas.

== Roster ==
Note: Flags indicate national team eligibility at FIBA-sanctioned events. Players may hold other non-FIBA nationalities not displayed.

2022–23 Illawarra Hawks roster
Players
Coaches

Pos.	No.	Nat.	Name	Ht.	Wt.
G	1	(United States)	Harvey, Tyler (C & I)	1.93 m (6 ft 4 in)	84 kg (185 lb)
G	3	(United States)	Robinson, Justin (injured) (IN)	1.85 m (6 ft 1 in)	88 kg (194 lb)
G	6	(Australia)	Hickey, William	1.94 m (6 ft 4 in)	92 kg (203 lb)
G	7	(Australia)	Dent, Lachlan	1.83 m (6 ft 0 in)	79 kg (174 lb)
G	8	(United States)	Siva, Peyton (injured) (I)	1.83 m (6 ft 0 in)	84 kg (185 lb)
G/F	9	(Australia)	Swaka Lo Buluk, Wani	1.98 m (6 ft 6 in)	88 kg (194 lb)
G	10	(Australia)	White, Kevin	1.87 m (6 ft 2 in)	94 kg (207 lb)
G/F	11	(Australia)	Grida, Daniel	1.97 m (6 ft 6 in)	93 kg (205 lb)
F/C	13	(Australia)	Froling, Sam (C)	2.13 m (7 ft 0 in)	109 kg (240 lb)
G	15	(Australia)	Mudronja, Alex	1.96 m (6 ft 5 in)	88 kg (194 lb)
F	22	(Australia)	Coenraad, Tim	1.99 m (6 ft 6 in)	97 kg (214 lb)
G	23	(United States)	Frazier II, Michael (injured) (I)	1.91 m (6 ft 3 in)	91 kg (201 lb)
F	28	(Australia)	Morris, Harry (DP)	1.98 m (6 ft 6 in)	95 kg (209 lb)
F	47	(Australia)	Gak, Akoldah	2.11 m (6 ft 11 in)	91 kg (201 lb)
F	77	(South Sudan)	Deng, Deng	2.03 m (6 ft 8 in)	93 kg (205 lb)
F	94	(United States)	King, George (injured) (IN)	1.98 m (6 ft 6 in)	100 kg (220 lb)

Head coach

- (Australia) Jacob Jackomas

Assistant coach(es)

- (Australia) Lachlan Lonergan
- (Australia) Paul Mellett
- (Australia) Shaun Roger

Strength & conditioning coach(es)

- (Australia) Alex Moore

Legend

- (C) Team captain
- (DP) Development player
- (IN) Inactive
- (I) Import player
- (SRP) Special restricted player
- (NS) Next Star player
- Injured

- Roster
Updated: 26 January 2023

== Standings ==
=== Ladder ===
Pos	2022–23 NBL season											
Pos	Team	Pld	W	L	PCT	Last 5	Streak	Home	Away	PF	PA	PP
1	Sydney Kings	28	19	9	67.86%	2–3	L2	10–4	9–5	2679	2468	108.55%
2	New Zealand Breakers	28	18	10	64.29%	5–0	W5	7–7	11–3	2423	2246	107.88%
3	Cairns Taipans	28	18	10	64.29%	2–3	W1	8–6	10–4	2455	2376	103.32%
4	Tasmania JackJumpers	28	16	12	57.14%	3–2	W2	7–7	9–5	2385	2305	103.47%
5	S.E. Melbourne Phoenix	28	15	13	53.57%	3–2	L1	11–3	4–10	2553	2512	101.63%
6	Perth Wildcats	28	15	13	53.57%	2–3	W1	9–5	6–8	2580	2568	100.47%
7	Melbourne United	28	15	13	53.57%	4–1	W1	8–6	7–7	2434	2424	100.41%
8	Adelaide 36ers	28	13	15	46.43%	2–3	L1	8–6	5–9	2546	2597	98.04%
9	Brisbane Bullets	28	8	20	28.57%	2–3	L3	4–10	4–10	2365	2600	90.96%
10	Illawarra Hawks	28	3	25	10.71%	1–4	L4	2–12	1–13	2261	2585	87.47%

Updated to match(es) played on 5 February 2023. Source: NBL.com.au

The NBL tie-breaker system as outlined in the NBL Rules and Regulations states that in the case of an identical win–loss record, the overall points percentage will determine order of seeding.

=== Ladder progression ===
Leader and qualification to semifinals
Qualification to semifinals
Qualification to play-in games
Last place

2022–23 NBL season
Team ╲ Round	1	2	3	4	5	6	7	8	9	10	11	12	13	14	15	16	17	18
Adelaide 36ers	—	—	7	4	8	8	7	6	6	7	7	7	7	5	8	8	8	8
Brisbane Bullets	9	9	10	9	9	9	9	9	8	9	9	9	9	9	9	9	9	9
Cairns Taipans	1	3	4	3	4	3	3	3	3	4	3	4	3	3	2	2	2	3
Illawarra Hawks	7	6	9	10	10	10	10	10	10	10	10	10	10	10	10	10	10	10
Melbourne United	5	5	6	8	6	6	8	8	9	8	8	8	8	8	6	7	7	7
New Zealand Breakers	6	4	3	2	1	2	2	1	2	2	1	2	2	2	3	3	3	2
Perth Wildcats	2	1	2	5	7	7	5	7	7	6	5	6	5	7	5	5	5	6
S.E. Melbourne Phoenix	4	7	8	7	3	4	4	4	4	3	4	3	4	6	7	6	6	5
Sydney Kings	3	2	1	1	2	1	1	2	1	1	2	1	1	1	1	1	1	1
Tasmania JackJumpers	8	8	5	6	5	5	6	5	5	5	6	5	6	4	4	4	4	4

Updated to match(es) played on 5 February 2023. Source: NBL.com.au

== Game log ==
=== Pre-season ===
2022 pre-season game log
Total: 0–2 (Home: 0–1; Road: 0–1)
September: 0–2 (Home: 0–1; Road: 0–1)

Game	Date	Team	Score	High points	High rebounds	High assists	Location Attendance	Record
1	3 September	UC Riverside Highlanders	L 87–94	Tyler Harvey (24)	Sam Froling (7)	Harvey, Robinson (3)	Snakepit; 1,500	0–1
2	10 September	@ New Zealand	L 71–68 (OT)	Justin Robinson (26)	Deng Deng (15)	Sam Froling (3)	The Stockyard; 600	0–2

2022 NBL Blitz game log
Total: 2–1 (Home:1–1; Road: 1–0)
September: 2–1 (Home: 1–1; Road: 1–0)

Game	Date	Team	Score	High points	High rebounds	High assists	Location Attendance	Record
1	18 September	Melbourne	W 81–68	Froling, Robinson (14)	Sam Froling (8)	Justin Robinson (8)	Darwin Basketball Facility; 922	1–0
2	20 September	@ New Zealand	W 81–85	Tyler Harvey (27)	Sam Froling (7)	Justin Robinson (8)	Darwin Basketball Facility; 660	2–0
3	22 September	Adelaide	L 77–84	George King (20)	Deng, King (8)	Harvey, White (4)	Darwin Basketball Facility; 912	2–1

=== Regular season ===
2022–23 game log
Total: 3–25 (Home: 2–12; Road: 1–13)
October: 1–7 (Home: 1–4; Road: 0–3)

Game	Date	Team	Score	High points	High rebounds	High assists	Location Attendance	Record
1	1 October	Sydney	L 97–106	Lachlan Dent (19)	Sam Froling (10)	Justin Robinson (8)	WIN Entertainment Centre; 4,008	0–1
2	6 October	S.E. Melbourne	W 85–72	Tyler Harvey (22)	Sam Froling (9)	Lachlan Dent (5)	WIN Entertainment Centre; 2,806	1–1
3	8 October	@ Perth	L 77–71	George King (25)	Deng Deng (12)	Tyler Harvey (5)	RAC Arena; 10,816	1–2
4	15 October	@ Adelaide	L 90–80	Deng Deng (18)	George King (9)	Deng, Dent, Harvey (3)	Adelaide Entertainment Centre; 8,143	1–3
5	17 October	New Zealand	L 62–88	Tyler Harvey (12)	George King (8)	Lachlan Dent (4)	WIN Entertainment Centre; 2,208	1–4
6	24 October	Brisbane	L 56–82	Tyler Harvey (13)	Dent, Froling, Mathiang (6)	Lachlan Dent (4)	WIN Entertainment Centre; 2,011	1–5
7	27 October	@ Brisbane	L 86–61	Deng Deng (11)	Sam Froling (12)	Peyton Siva (5)	Nissan Arena; 2,583	1–6
8	29 October	Melbourne	L 100–106 (2OT)	Sam Froling (27)	Sam Froling (15)	Peyton Siva (11)	WIN Entertainment Centre; 3,139	1–7

November: 0–3 (Home: 0–1; Road: 0–2)

Game	Date	Team	Score	High points	High rebounds	High assists	Location Attendance	Record
9	3 November	Adelaide	L 80–96	Tyler Harvey (25)	Sam Froling (11)	Peyton Siva (10)	WIN Entertainment Centre; 2,118	1–8
10	20 November	@ Sydney	L 83–82	Tyler Harvey (32)	Deng Deng (9)	Dent, Froling, Hickey (3)	Qudos Bank Arena; 11,032	1–9
11	27 November	@ S.E. Melbourne	L 112–78	Frazier, Harvey (17)	Sam Froling (7)	Harvey, Siva (3)	John Cain Arena; 5,099	1–10

December: 1–6 (Home: 1–2; Road: 0–4)

Game	Date	Team	Score	High points	High rebounds	High assists	Location Attendance	Record
12	5 December	Melbourne	W 93–79	Sam Froling (29)	Deng, Froling (9)	Peyton Siva (7)	WIN Entertainment Centre; 2,248	2–10
13	8 December	@ S.E. Melbourne	L 111–72	Michael Frazier II (20)	Mangok Mathiang (6)	Peyton Siva (3)	John Cain Arena; 2,918	2–11
14	10 December	@ Cairns	L 102–101 (2OT)	Michael Frazier II (26)	Deng Deng (13)	Peyton Siva (8)	Cairns Convention Centre; 3,607	2–12
15	16 December	Sydney	L 79–86	Tyler Harvey (19)	Mangok Mathiang (8)	Peyton Siva (6)	WIN Entertainment Centre; 3,288	2–13
16	18 December	@ Melbourne	L 88–77	Michael Frazier II (27)	Deng, Froling, Harvey (6)	Peyton Siva (4)	John Cain Arena; 6,806	2–14
17	22 December	@ Tasmania	L 87–60	Sam Froling (19)	Sam Froling (8)	Peyton Siva (9)	MyState Bank Arena; 4,269	2–15
18	31 December	Perth	L 97–107	Tyler Harvey (28)	Sam Froling (13)	Froling, Siva (3)	WIN Entertainment Centre; 3,776	2–16

January: 1–7 (Home: 0–3; Road: 1–4)

Game	Date	Team	Score	High points	High rebounds	High assists	Location Attendance	Record
19	2 January	Cairns	L 89–96	Sam Froling (25)	Sam Froling (13)	Sam Froling (5)	WIN Entertainment Centre; 2,718	2–17
20	6 January	@ Adelaide	L 103–95	Tyler Harvey (22)	Sam Froling (10)	Deng Deng (3)	Adelaide Entertainment Centre; 9,308	2–18
21	10 January	Tasmania	L 89–92	Tyler Harvey (22)	Sam Froling (8)	Sam Froling (8)	WIN Entertainment Centre; 2,846	2–19
22	13 January	@ Cairns	L 89–84	Tyler Harvey (25)	Deng, Mathiang (8)	Tyler Harvey (5)	Cairns Convention Centre; 4,063	2–20
23	15 January	@ Sydney	L 84–79	Tyler Harvey (24)	Deng, Froling (9)	Sam Froling (5)	Qudos Bank Arena; 12,986	2–21
24	19 January	@ New Zealand	W 76–78	Tyler Harvey (25)	Daniel Grida (7)	William Hickey (4)	Spark Arena; 3,967	3–21
25	21 January	Brisbane	L 86–103	Tyler Harvey (22)	Deng, Mathiang (6)	Dent, Froling (3)	WIN Entertainment Centre; 3,503	3–22
26	27 January	@ Perth	L 106–86	Tyler Harvey (23)	Sam Froling (10)	William Hickey (5)	RAC Arena; 12,521	3–23

February: 0–2 (Home: 0–2; Road: 0–0)

Game	Date	Team	Score	High points	High rebounds	High assists	Location Attendance	Record
27	2 February	New Zealand	L 81–91	Tyler Harvey (22)	Froling, Gak, Hickey (6)	Sam Froling (5)	WIN Entertainment Centre; 2,039	3–24
28	4 February	Tasmania	L 63–87	Tyler Harvey (13)	Froling, Grida (7)	Lachlan Dent (2)	WIN Entertainment Centre; 3,511	3–25

2022–23 season schedule

== Transactions ==
=== Re-signed ===
Player	Signed
Sam Froling	25 February
Daniel Grida	17 March
Lachlan Dent	26 July
Tim Coenraad	18 September

=== Additions ===
Player	Signed	Former team
Wani Swaka Lo Buluk	20 May	Sydney Kings
Deng Deng	1 June	Brisbane Bullets
Mangok Mathiang	29 July	Casey Cavaliers
George King	8 August	Ontario Clippers
Justin Robinson	10 August	Detroit Pistons
William Hickey	31 August	Melbourne United
Harry Morris	31 August	Illawarra Hawks (NBL1)
Kevin White	17 September	Perth Wildcats
Peyton Siva	19 October	New Zealand Breakers
Michael Frazier II	21 November	Perth Wildcats

=== Subtractions ===
Player	Reason left	New team
Harry Froling	Free agent	Brisbane Bullets
Antonius Cleveland	Free agent	Adelaide 36ers
Emmett Naar	Free agent	Heroes Den Bosch
Xavier Rathan-Mayes	Free agent	Melbourne United
Andrew Ogilvy	Retired	N/A
Mangok Mathiang	Mutual release	N/A

== Awards ==
=== Club awards ===
- Club MVP: Sam Froling
- Members Choice Award: Tyler Harvey
- Player's Player Award: Akoldah Gak
- Defensive Player: Wani Swaka Lo Buluk
- Community Award: Daniel Grida
- Club Person of the Year: Alex Moore
- Volunteer of the Year: Carl Stanbridge

== See also ==
- 2022–23 NBL season
- Illawarra Hawks
