= 2022–23 Cairns Taipans season =

- Head coach: (Australia) Adam Forde
- Captain: (United States) Tahjere McCall
- Arena: Cairns Convention Centre

NBL results
- Record: 18–10 (64.3%)
- Ladder: 3rd
- Finals finish: Semifinalist (lost to Kings 1–2)
- Stats at NBL.com.au

Player records
- Points: (United States) Hogg 17.6
- Rebounds: (Australia) Pinder 9.3
- Assists: (United States) Scott 5.4
- All statistics correct as of 19 February 2023.

The 2022–23 Cairns Taipans season was the 24th season of the franchise in the National Basketball League (NBL).

== Roster ==
Note: Flags indicate national team eligibility at FIBA-sanctioned events. Players may hold other non-FIBA nationalities not displayed.

2022–23 Cairns Taipans roster
Players
Coaches

Pos.	No.	Nat.	Name	Ht.	Wt.
F	1	(United States)	Hogg, D. J. (I)	2.07 m (6 ft 9 in)	102 kg (225 lb)
G	3	(United States)	Scott, Shannon (I)	1.87 m (6 ft 2 in)	88 kg (194 lb)
G	4	(Australia)	Hadley, Gabe (TP)	1.93 m (6 ft 4 in)	91 kg (201 lb)
G	5	(Australia)	Đerić, Mirko	1.93 m (6 ft 4 in)	94 kg (207 lb)
G	6	(Australia)	Antonio, Jonah	1.94 m (6 ft 4 in)	88 kg (194 lb)
G	10	(Australia)	Ayre, Ben	1.84 m (6 ft 0 in)	80 kg (176 lb)
F	11	(Australia)	Mayen, Lat	2.06 m (6 ft 9 in)	94 kg (207 lb)
F	13	(South Sudan)	Deng, Majok	2.05 m (6 ft 9 in)	88 kg (194 lb)
F	21	(New Zealand)	Waardenburg, Sam	2.08 m (6 ft 10 in)	102 kg (225 lb)
G	22	(United States)	McCall, Tahjere (C & I)	1.93 m (6 ft 4 in)	86 kg (190 lb)
F	25	(Australia)	Pinder, Keanu (injured)	2.05 m (6 ft 9 in)	100 kg (220 lb)
F	42	(South Sudan)	Kuol, Bul	2.01 m (6 ft 7 in)	98 kg (216 lb)
F	44	(Australia)	Davey, Joshua (DP)	2.00 m (6 ft 7 in)	99 kg (218 lb)

Head coach

- (Australia) Adam Forde

Assistant coach(es)

- (Australia) Sam Gruggen
- (Australia) Kerry Williams

Legend

- (C) Team captain
- (DP) Development player
- (IN) Inactive
- (I) Import player
- (SRP) Special restricted player
- (NS) Next Star player
- Injured

- Roster
Updated: 19 February 2023

== Standings ==
=== Ladder ===
Pos	2022–23 NBL season											
Pos	Team	Pld	W	L	PCT	Last 5	Streak	Home	Away	PF	PA	PP
1	Sydney Kings	28	19	9	67.86%	2–3	L2	10–4	9–5	2679	2468	108.55%
2	New Zealand Breakers	28	18	10	64.29%	5–0	W5	7–7	11–3	2423	2246	107.88%
3	Cairns Taipans	28	18	10	64.29%	2–3	W1	8–6	10–4	2455	2376	103.32%
4	Tasmania JackJumpers	28	16	12	57.14%	3–2	W2	7–7	9–5	2385	2305	103.47%
5	S.E. Melbourne Phoenix	28	15	13	53.57%	3–2	L1	11–3	4–10	2553	2512	101.63%
6	Perth Wildcats	28	15	13	53.57%	2–3	W1	9–5	6–8	2580	2568	100.47%
7	Melbourne United	28	15	13	53.57%	4–1	W1	8–6	7–7	2434	2424	100.41%
8	Adelaide 36ers	28	13	15	46.43%	2–3	L1	8–6	5–9	2546	2597	98.04%
9	Brisbane Bullets	28	8	20	28.57%	2–3	L3	4–10	4–10	2365	2600	90.96%
10	Illawarra Hawks	28	3	25	10.71%	1–4	L4	2–12	1–13	2261	2585	87.47%

Updated to match(es) played on 5 February 2023. Source: NBL.com.au

The NBL tie-breaker system as outlined in the NBL Rules and Regulations states that in the case of an identical win–loss record, the overall points percentage will determine order of seeding.

=== Ladder progression ===
Leader and qualification to semifinals
Qualification to semifinals
Qualification to play-in games
Last place

2022–23 NBL season
Team ╲ Round	1	2	3	4	5	6	7	8	9	10	11	12	13	14	15	16	17	18
Adelaide 36ers	—	—	7	4	8	8	7	6	6	7	7	7	7	5	8	8	8	8
Brisbane Bullets	9	9	10	9	9	9	9	9	8	9	9	9	9	9	9	9	9	9
Cairns Taipans	1	3	4	3	4	3	3	3	3	4	3	4	3	3	2	2	2	3
Illawarra Hawks	7	6	9	10	10	10	10	10	10	10	10	10	10	10	10	10	10	10
Melbourne United	5	5	6	8	6	6	8	8	9	8	8	8	8	8	6	7	7	7
New Zealand Breakers	6	4	3	2	1	2	2	1	2	2	1	2	2	2	3	3	3	2
Perth Wildcats	2	1	2	5	7	7	5	7	7	6	5	6	5	7	5	5	5	6
S.E. Melbourne Phoenix	4	7	8	7	3	4	4	4	4	3	4	3	4	6	7	6	6	5
Sydney Kings	3	2	1	1	2	1	1	2	1	1	2	1	1	1	1	1	1	1
Tasmania JackJumpers	8	8	5	6	5	5	6	5	5	5	6	5	6	4	4	4	4	4

Updated to match(es) played on 5 February 2023. Source: NBL.com.au

== Game log ==
=== NBL Blitz ===
2022 NBL Blitz game log
Total: 0–3 (home: 0–1; road: 0–2)
September: 0–3 (Home: 0–1; Road: 0–2)

Game	Date	Team	Score	High points	High rebounds	High assists	Location Attendance	Record
1	17 September	@ Perth	L 98–80	Keanu Pinder (21)	Tahjere McCall (8)	Tahjere McCall (6)	Darwin Basketball Facility; 916	0–1
2	20 September	Brisbane	L 76–77	Bul Kuol (21)	Joshua Davey (8)	Tahjere McCall (4)	Darwin Basketball Facility; 660	0–2
3	22 September	@ Tasmania	L 100–81	Ben Ayre (26)	Joshua Davey (7)	Ayre, Davey, Đerić, Scott (2)	Darwin Basketball Facility; 912	0–3

=== Regular season ===
2022–23 game log
Total: 18–10 (home: 8–6; road: 10–4)
October: 4–3 (Home: 0–2; Road: 4–1)

Game	Date	Team	Score	High points	High rebounds	High assists	Location Attendance	Record
1	3 October	@ Tasmania	W 84–106	Majok Deng (26)	Tahjere McCall (7)	Tahjere McCall (7)	MyState Bank Arena; 4,231	1–0
2	8 October	@ S.E. Melbourne	W 76–85	Keanu Pinder (19)	Hogg, Pinder (8)	Shannon Scott (7)	John Cain Arena; 4,953	2–0
3	10 October	Perth	L 76–105	Keanu Pinder (18)	Keanu Pinder (15)	Shannon Scott (8)	Cairns Convention Centre; 3,608	2–1
4	14 October	@ Sydney	W 78–83	Pinder, Scott (16)	Keanu Pinder (11)	Hogg, Scott (5)	Qudos Bank Arena; 7,287	3–1
5	20 October	@ Melbourne	W 77–81	Keanu Pinder (26)	Keanu Pinder (10)	Shannon Scott (9)	John Cain Arena; 4,449	4–1
6	23 October	New Zealand	L 64–68	D. J. Hogg (25)	Keanu Pinder (12)	Shannon Scott (8)	Cairns Convention Centre; 4,091	4–2
7	29 October	@ Sydney	L 106–103	D. J. Hogg (27)	Keanu Pinder (7)	Shannon Scott (8)	Qudos Bank Arena; 7,282	4–3

November: 3–1 (Home: 2–1; Road: 1–0)

Game	Date	Team	Score	High points	High rebounds	High assists	Location Attendance	Record
8	4 November	Melbourne	W 97–72	Kuol, Pinder (18)	Keanu Pinder (11)	Shannon Scott (6)	Cairns Convention Centre; 3,704	5–3
9	19 November	@ Brisbane	W 82–90	Keanu Pinder (25)	Hogg, Pinder (8)	Shannon Scott (10)	Nissan Arena; 4,401	6–3
10	25 November	New Zealand	L 71–82	Sam Waardenburg (15)	Keanu Pinder (10)	Shannon Scott (7)	Cairns Convention Centre; 3,661	6–4
11	28 November	Sydney	W 94–88 (OT)	Keanu Pinder (30)	Keanu Pinder (13)	Tahjere McCall (4)	Cairns Convention Centre; 3,636	7–4

December: 4–3 (Home: 3–1; Road: 1–2)

Game	Date	Team	Score	High points	High rebounds	High assists	Location Attendance	Record
12	2 December	@ Adelaide	L 78–75	Tahjere McCall (24)	Keanu Pinder (8)	Shannon Scott (6)	Adelaide Entertainment Centre; 7,198	7–5
13	10 December	Illawarra	W 102–101 (2OT)	Hogg, McCall (23)	Keanu Pinder (14)	Pinder, Scott (6)	Cairns Convention Centre; 3,607	8–5
14	14 December	Brisbane	W 85–76	Bul Kuol (23)	Keanu Pinder (15)	Tahjere McCall (7)	Cairns Convention Centre; 3,497	9–5
15	17 December	@ Tasmania	W 82–91	Keanu Pinder (34)	Hogg, Pinder (7)	Shannon Scott (6)	MyState Bank Arena; 4,231	10–5
16	20 December	Perth	L 83–105	D. J. Hogg (24)	Tahjere McCall (10)	Tahjere McCall (4)	Cairns Convention Centre; 3,752	10–6
17	23 December	@ Melbourne	L 84–81	Tahjere McCall (21)	Keanu Pinder (8)	Tahjere McCall (4)	John Cain Arena; 10,175	10–7
18	31 December	Adelaide	W 86–83	Shannon Scott (31)	Joshua Davey (5)	Tahjere McCall (5)	Cairns Convention Centre; 4,851	11–7

January: 6–3 (Home: 3–2; Road: 3–1)

Game	Date	Team	Score	High points	High rebounds	High assists	Location Attendance	Record
19	2 January	@ Illawarra	W 89–96	Shannon Scott (18)	Sam Waardenburg (9)	McCall, Scott (6)	WIN Entertainment Centre; 2,718	12–7
20	5 January	@ Brisbane	W 81–107	Sam Waardenburg (24)	Sam Waardenburg (8)	Kuol, McCall (6)	Nissan Arena; 4,258	13–7
21	8 January	S.E. Melbourne	W 94–85	Tahjere McCall (24)	Sam Waardenburg (7)	Hogg, Scott (7)	Cairns Convention Centre; 4,457	14–7
22	13 January	Illawarra	W 89–84	Tahjere McCall (24)	Tahjere McCall (11)	Shannon Scott (6)	Cairns Convention Centre; 4,063	15–7
23	15 January	@ New Zealand	W 83–85	Hogg, Kuol, McCall (18)	Sam Waardenburg (10)	Ayre, Scott (3)	Spark Arena; 7,194	16–7
24	20 January	Tasmania	L 77–85	Hogg, Kuol (17)	Bul Kuol (8)	Shannon Scott (6)	Cairns Convention Centre; 4,705	16–8
25	25 January	@ S.E. Melbourne	L 85–80	D. J. Hogg (24)	Sam Waardenburg (10)	Sam Waardenburg (4)	State Basketball Centre; 3,300	16–9
26	28 January	Brisbane	W 94–87	Hogg, Kuol, McCall (23)	Sam Waardenburg (10)	D. J. Hogg (6)	Cairns Convention Centre; 4,437	17–9
27	30 January	Adelaide	L 96–99	Hogg, Waardenburg (26)	Tahjere McCall (10)	Tahjere McCall (7)	Cairns Convention Centre; 3,530	17–10

February: 1–0 (Home: 0–0; Road: 1–0)

Game	Date	Team	Score	High points	High rebounds	High assists	Location Attendance	Record
28	3 February	@ Perth	W 71–84	Bul Kuol (15)	Majok Deng (11)	Shannon Scott (4)	RAC Arena; 11,668	18–10

2022–23 season schedule

=== Postseason ===
2023 finals game log
Total: 2–3 (home: 2–1; road: 0–2)
Seeding qualifier: 0–1 (Home: 0–1; Road: 0–0)

Game	Date	Team	Score	High points	High rebounds	High assists	Location Attendance	Record
1	9 February	Tasmania	L 79–87	Tahjere McCall (24)	D. J. Hogg (8)	D. J. Hogg (4)	Cairns Convention Centre; 3,670	0–1

Play-in game: 1–0 (Home: 1–0; Road: 0–0)

Game	Date	Team	Score	High points	High rebounds	High assists	Location Attendance	Record
2	12 February	Perth	W 91–78	D. J. Hogg (32)	Sam Waardenburg (10)	Shannon Scott (8)	Cairns Convention Centre; 3,020	1–1

Semifinals: 1–2 (Home: 1–0; Road: 0–2)

Game	Date	Team	Score	High points	High rebounds	High assists	Location Attendance	Record
3	15 February	@ Sydney	L 95–87	D. J. Hogg (24)	Sam Waardenburg (7)	Shannon Scott (7)	Qudos Bank Arena; 7,367	1–2
4	17 February	Sydney	W 93–82	D. J. Hogg (25)	Sam Waardenburg (10)	Tahjere McCall (7)	Cairns Convention Centre; 4,626	2–2
5	19 February	@ Sydney	L 79–64	Ben Ayre (20)	Sam Waardenburg (12)	Ben Ayre (4)	Qudos Bank Arena; 7,123	2–3

2022–23 season schedule

== Transactions ==
=== Re-signed ===
Player	Signed
Bul Kuol	16 May
Keanu Pinder	16 May
Tahjere McCall	31 May
Ben Ayre	21 July

=== Additions ===
Player	Signed	Former team
Sam Waardenburg	9 June	Miami Hurricanes
Jonah Antonio	15 June	Nova Hut Ostrava
Lat Mayen	30 June	Cairns Marlins
D.J. Hogg	12 July	Cholet Basket
Shannon Scott	12 August	Brose Bamberg
Joshua Davey	30 August	Lakeside Lightning
Gabe Hadley	30 August	Geelong Supercats

=== Subtractions ===
Player	Reason left	New team
Marshall Nelson	Released	Rockingham Flames
Scott Machado	Free agent	Hapoel Eilat
Kouat Noi	Mutual option	Sydney Kings
Nathan Jawai	Free agent	Darwin Salties
Jordan Ngatai	Free agent	Wellington Saints
Jarrod Kenny	Free agent	Hawke's Bay Hawks

== Awards ==
=== Club awards ===
- Club MVP: D. J. Hogg
- Defensive Player: Tahjere McCall
- Players’ Player: Shannon Scott
- Commitment to Community: Adam Forde
- Members’ Choice MVP: D. J. Hogg
- Coaches Award: Ben Ayre

== See also ==
- 2022–23 NBL season
