= 2022–23 S.E. Melbourne Phoenix season =

- Head coach: (Australia) Simon Mitchell
- Co-captains: (Australia) Kyle Adnam (Australia) Ryan Broekhoff (Australia) Mitch Creek
- Arena: John Cain Arena

NBL results
- Record: 15–13 (53.6%)
- Ladder: 5th
- Finals finish: Play-in finalist (lost to Wildcats 99–106)
- Stats at NBL.com.au

Player records
- Points: (Australia) Creek 23.4
- Rebounds: (United States) Williams 9.6
- Assists: (Puerto Rico) Browne 6.5
- All statistics correct as of 9 February 2023.

The 2022–23 S.E. Melbourne Phoenix season was the 4th season of the franchise in the National Basketball League (NBL).

== Roster ==
Note: Flags indicate national team eligibility at FIBA-sanctioned events. Players may hold other non-FIBA nationalities not displayed.

2022–23 South East Melbourne Phoenix roster
Players
Coaches

Pos.	No.	Nat.	Name	Ht.	Wt.
G/F	0	(South Sudan)	Madut, Junior	1.98 m (6 ft 6 in)	79 kg (174 lb)
C	1	(New Zealand)	Rissetto, Anzac (DP)	2.08 m (6 ft 10 in)	102 kg (225 lb)
G	3	(United States)	Kell, Trey (I)	1.93 m (6 ft 4 in)	98 kg (216 lb)
G	4	(Australia)	Adnam, Kyle (C)	1.86 m (6 ft 1 in)	84 kg (185 lb)
G	5	(United States)	Bernard, Malcolm (IN)	1.98 m (6 ft 6 in)	88 kg (194 lb)
G/F	7	(New Zealand)	Te Rangi, Reuben	1.98 m (6 ft 6 in)	105 kg (231 lb)
F	11	(Australia)	Anticevich, Grant	2.03 m (6 ft 8 in)	104 kg (229 lb)
G	14	(Puerto Rico)	Browne, Gary (I)	1.85 m (6 ft 1 in)	88 kg (194 lb)
F/C	15	(United States)	Williams, Alan (I)	2.03 m (6 ft 8 in)	120 kg (265 lb)
F	18	(New Zealand)	Smith-Milner, Tohi	2.05 m (6 ft 9 in)	112 kg (247 lb)
C	22	(Australia)	Pineau, Dane	2.06 m (6 ft 9 in)	102 kg (225 lb)
C	26	(China)	Zhou Qi (SRP)	2.16 m (7 ft 1 in)	96 kg (212 lb)
G	30	(Australia)	Foxwell, Owen (DP)	1.87 m (6 ft 2 in)	78 kg (172 lb)
G/F	45	(Australia)	Broekhoff, Ryan (C)	1.98 m (6 ft 6 in)	95 kg (209 lb)
G/F	55	(Australia)	Creek, Mitch (C)	1.96 m (6 ft 5 in)	102 kg (225 lb)

Head coach

- (Australia) Simon Mitchell

Assistant coach(es)

- (Australia) Lucas Allen
- (Australia) Craig Simpson

Legend

- (C) Team captain
- (DP) Development player
- (IN) Inactive
- (I) Import player
- (SRP) Special restricted player
- (NS) Next Star player
- Injured

- Roster
Updated: 26 January 2023

== Standings ==
=== Ladder ===
Pos	2022–23 NBL season											
Pos	Team	Pld	W	L	PCT	Last 5	Streak	Home	Away	PF	PA	PP
1	Sydney Kings	28	19	9	67.86%	2–3	L2	10–4	9–5	2679	2468	108.55%
2	New Zealand Breakers	28	18	10	64.29%	5–0	W5	7–7	11–3	2423	2246	107.88%
3	Cairns Taipans	28	18	10	64.29%	2–3	W1	8–6	10–4	2455	2376	103.32%
4	Tasmania JackJumpers	28	16	12	57.14%	3–2	W2	7–7	9–5	2385	2305	103.47%
5	S.E. Melbourne Phoenix	28	15	13	53.57%	3–2	L1	11–3	4–10	2553	2512	101.63%
6	Perth Wildcats	28	15	13	53.57%	2–3	W1	9–5	6–8	2580	2568	100.47%
7	Melbourne United	28	15	13	53.57%	4–1	W1	8–6	7–7	2434	2424	100.41%
8	Adelaide 36ers	28	13	15	46.43%	2–3	L1	8–6	5–9	2546	2597	98.04%
9	Brisbane Bullets	28	8	20	28.57%	2–3	L3	4–10	4–10	2365	2600	90.96%
10	Illawarra Hawks	28	3	25	10.71%	1–4	L4	2–12	1–13	2261	2585	87.47%

Updated to match(es) played on 5 February 2023. Source: NBL.com.au

The NBL tie-breaker system as outlined in the NBL Rules and Regulations states that in the case of an identical win–loss record, the overall points percentage will determine order of seeding.

=== Ladder progression ===
Leader and qualification to semifinals
Qualification to semifinals
Qualification to play-in games
Last place

2022–23 NBL season
Team ╲ Round	1	2	3	4	5	6	7	8	9	10	11	12	13	14	15	16	17	18
Adelaide 36ers	—	—	7	4	8	8	7	6	6	7	7	7	7	5	8	8	8	8
Brisbane Bullets	9	9	10	9	9	9	9	9	8	9	9	9	9	9	9	9	9	9
Cairns Taipans	1	3	4	3	4	3	3	3	3	4	3	4	3	3	2	2	2	3
Illawarra Hawks	7	6	9	10	10	10	10	10	10	10	10	10	10	10	10	10	10	10
Melbourne United	5	5	6	8	6	6	8	8	9	8	8	8	8	8	6	7	7	7
New Zealand Breakers	6	4	3	2	1	2	2	1	2	2	1	2	2	2	3	3	3	2
Perth Wildcats	2	1	2	5	7	7	5	7	7	6	5	6	5	7	5	5	5	6
S.E. Melbourne Phoenix	4	7	8	7	3	4	4	4	4	3	4	3	4	6	7	6	6	5
Sydney Kings	3	2	1	1	2	1	1	2	1	1	2	1	1	1	1	1	1	1
Tasmania JackJumpers	8	8	5	6	5	5	6	5	5	5	6	5	6	4	4	4	4	4

Updated to match(es) played on 5 February 2023. Source: NBL.com.au

== Game log ==
=== Pre-season ===
2022 pre-season game log
Total: 0–3 (home: 0–1; road: 0–2)
August: 0–1 (Home: 0–1; Road: 0–0)

Game	Date	Team	Score	High points	High rebounds	High assists	Location Attendance	Record
1	10 August	Saint Mary's	L 74–86 (OT)	Kyle Adnam (12)	Tohi Smith-Milner (8)	Kyle Adnam (5)	Frankston Stadium; 400	0–1

September: 0–2 (Home: 0–0; Road: 0–2)

Game	Date	Team	Score	High points	High rebounds	High assists	Location Attendance	Record
2	6 September	@ Tasmania	L 88–83	Alan Williams (15)	Grant Anticevich (8)	Browne, Kell (4)	Ulverstone Sports & Leisure Centre; 1,100	0–2
3	8 September	@ Tasmania	L 84–80	Kyle Adnam (15)	Dane Pineau (8)	Gary Browne (4)	Elphin Sports Centre; 1,100	0–3

=== NBL Blitz ===
2022 NBL Blitz game log
Total: 0–3 (home: 0–1; road: 0–2)
September: 0–3 (Home: 0–1; Road: 0–2)

Game	Date	Team	Score	High points	High rebounds	High assists	Location Attendance	Record
1	16 September	Adelaide	L 76–84	Kyle Adnam (19)	Alan Williams (7)	Kyle Adnam (4)	Darwin Basketball Facility not available	0–1
2	19 September	@ Perth	L 87–71	Kyle Adnam (16)	Alan Williams (11)	Gary Browne (8)	Darwin Basketball Facility; 838	0–2
3	21 September	Sydney	L 91–79	Kyle Adnam (24)	Junior Madut (8)	Kyle Adnam (5)	Darwin Basketball Facility; 917	0–3

=== Regular season ===
2022–23 game log
Total: 15–13 (home: 11–3; road: 4–10)
October: 5–3 (Home: 3–2; Road: 2–1)

Game	Date	Team	Score	High points	High rebounds	High assists	Location Attendance	Record
1	1 October	Tasmania	W 84–79	Kyle Adnam (30)	Anticevich, Williams (7)	Kyle Adnam (4)	John Cain Arena; 5,728	1–0
2	6 October	@ Illawarra	L 85–72	Junior Madut (21)	Alan Williams (11)	Kyle Adnam (6)	WIN Entertainment Centre; 2,806	1–1
3	8 October	Cairns	L 76–85	Mitch Creek (27)	Pineau, Williams (8)	Alan Williams (5)	John Cain Arena; 4,953	1–2
4	15 October	New Zealand	L 77–85	Mitch Creek (20)	Ryan Broekhoff (8)	Kyle Adnam (7)	John Cain Arena; 4,364	1–3
5	20 October	@ New Zealand	W 77–99	Kyle Adnam (17)	Alan Williams (9)	Gary Browne (9)	The Trusts Arena; 2,288	2–3
6	22 October	Brisbane	W 89–88	Mitch Creek (31)	Alan Williams (8)	Gary Browne (11)	John Cain Arena; 5,432	3–3
7	28 October	@ Perth	W 90–91	Mitch Creek (22)	Alan Williams (7)	Gary Browne (8)	RAC Arena; 11,103	4–3
8	30 October	Adelaide	W 103–98 (OT)	Trey Kell (24)	Mitch Creek (9)	Gary Browne (7)	John Cain Arena; 7,195	5–3

November: 2–2 (Home: 2–0; Road: 0–2)

Game	Date	Team	Score	High points	High rebounds	High assists	Location Attendance	Record
9	6 November	@ Melbourne	L 110–85	Alan Williams (30)	Alan Williams (14)	Gary Browne (8)	John Cain Arena; 10,300	5–4
10	17 November	@ Perth	L 103–96	Mitch Creek (32)	Creek, Te Rangi, Williams (8)	Gary Browne (6)	RAC Arena; 9,988	5–5
11	19 November	Melbourne	W 84–69	Mitch Creek (23)	Alan Williams (15)	Gary Browne (11)	John Cain Arena; 10,175	6–5
12	27 November	Illawarra	W 112–78	Mitch Creek (27)	Alan Williams (12)	Gary Browne (8)	John Cain Arena; 5,099	7–5

December: 5–3 (Home: 4–0; Road: 1–3)

Game	Date	Team	Score	High points	High rebounds	High assists	Location Attendance	Record
13	1 December	@ New Zealand	L 110–84	Alan Williams (29)	Alan Williams (13)	Kyle Adnam (5)	Christchurch Arena; 3,500	7–6
14	3 December	Melbourne	W 78–72	Alan Williams (18)	Alan Williams (12)	Gary Browne (7)	John Cain Arena; 5,651	8–6
15	8 December	Illawarra	W 111–72	Ryan Broekhoff (21)	Alan Williams (11)	Gary Browne (10)	John Cain Arena; 2,918	9–6
16	11 December	Adelaide	W 102–84	Mitch Creek (24)	Zhou Qi (10)	Mitch Creek (4)	John Cain Arena; 4,820	10–6
17	15 December	@ Melbourne	L 92–76	Mitch Creek (22)	Alan Williams (12)	Gary Browne (4)	John Cain Arena; 6,228	10–7
18	18 December	Sydney	W 113–112 (2OT)	Mitch Creek (46)	Mitch Creek (10)	Kyle Adnam (6)	Gippsland Regional Indoor Stadium; 3,000	11–7
19	21 December	@ Brisbane	W 77–104	Mitch Creek (29)	Kell, Pineau (10)	Trey Kell (6)	Nissan Arena; 3,375	12–7
20	24 December	@ Adelaide	L 94–88	Mitch Creek (24)	Mitch Creek (5)	Trey Kell (4)	Adelaide Entertainment Centre; 6,033	12–8

January: 3–5 (Home: 2–1; Road: 1–4)

Game	Date	Team	Score	High points	High rebounds	High assists	Location Attendance	Record
21	1 January	@ Tasmania	L 99–74	Alan Williams (21)	Alan Williams (11)	Creek, Foxwell (4)	MyState Bank Arena; 4,269	12–9
22	4 January	@ Sydney	L 118–102	Mitch Creek (32)	Alan Williams (10)	Mitch Creek (6)	Qudos Bank Arena; 11,321	12–10
23	8 January	@ Cairns	L 94–85	Mitch Creek (25)	Alan Williams (10)	Alan Williams (5)	Cairns Convention Centre; 4,457	12–11
24	16 January	Brisbane	L 79–84	Alan Williams (19)	Mitch Creek (13)	Gary Browne (6)	State Basketball Centre; 3,333	12–12
25	18 January	@ Tasmania	W 75–86	Mitch Creek (23)	Mitch Creek (11)	Creek, Kell (5)	Silverdome; 2,286	13–12
26	22 January	Perth	W 112–91	Alan Williams (27)	Alan Williams (14)	Gary Browne (8)	State Basketball Centre; 3,300	14–12
27	25 January	Cairns	W 85–80	Mitch Creek (21)	Alan Williams (13)	Gary Browne (5)	State Basketball Centre; 3,300	15–12
28	29 January	@ Sydney	L 111–106	Mitch Creek (29)	Alan Williams (12)	Gary Browne (8)	Qudos Bank Arena; 13,273	15–13

February: 0–0 (Home: 0–0; Road: 0–0)

Game	Date	Team	Score	High points	High rebounds	High assists	Location Attendance	Record
–	4 February	@ Brisbane	Postponed (COVID-19) (Makeup date: 21 December)					

2022–23 season schedule

=== Postseason ===
2023 finals game log
Total: 0–1 (home: 0–1; road: 0–0)
Play-in qualifier: 0–1 (Home: 0–1; Road: 0–0)

Game	Date	Team	Score	High points	High rebounds	High assists	Location Attendance	Record
1	9 February	Perth	L 99–106	Mitch Creek (24)	Alan Williams (17)	Gary Browne (5)	John Cain Arena; 5,176	0–1

2022–23 season schedule

== Transactions ==
=== Re-signed ===
Player	Signed
Reuben Te Rangi	24 March
Mitch Creek	18 May
Owen Foxwell	1 July
Zhou Qi	27 September

=== Additions ===
Player	Signed	Former team
Junior Madut	9 June	Hawaii Rainbow Warriors
Gary Browne	15 June	Piratas de Quebradillas
Trey Kell	14 July	Olimpia Milano
Alan Williams	5 August	Lokomotiv Kuban
Grant Anticevich	10 August	California Golden Bears
Anzac Rissetto	30 August	Franklin Bulls
Malcolm Bernard	26 September	Bendigo Braves

=== Subtractions ===
Player	Reason left	New team
Adam Gibson	Retired	N/A
Izayah Le'afa	Mutual release	New Zealand Breakers
Cameron Gliddon	Free agent	New Zealand Breakers
Tristan Forsyth	Free agent	Tasmania JackJumpers
Xavier Munford	Free agent	Hapoel Tel Aviv
Lachlan Barker	Released	Melbourne United
Koen Sapwell	Released	Brisbane Bullets
Zhou Qi	Family reasons	N/A

== Awards ==
=== Club awards ===
- Club MVP: Mitch Creek

== See also ==
- 2022–23 NBL season
- South East Melbourne Phoenix
