= 2022–23 Adelaide 36ers season =

National Basketball League team season

- Head coach: (Australia) C. J. Bruton
- Captain: (Australia) Mitch McCarron
- Arena: Adelaide Entertainment Centre

NBL results
- Record: 13–15 (46.4%)
- Ladder: 8th
- Finals finish: Did not qualify
- Stats at NBL.com.au

Player records
- Points: (United States) Franks 17.7
- Rebounds: (United States) Franks 6.5
- Assists: (Australia) McCarron 3.8
- All statistics correct as of 5 February 2023.

The 2022–23 Adelaide 36ers season was the 42nd season of the franchise in the National Basketball League (NBL).

On 2 October 2022, the 36ers became the first NBL team to beat an NBA team when they defeated the Phoenix Suns.

== Roster ==
Note: Flags indicate national team eligibility at FIBA-sanctioned events. Players may hold other non-FIBA nationalities not displayed.

2022–23 Adelaide 36ers roster
Players
Coaches

Pos.	No.	Nat.	Name	Ht.	Wt.
F	0	(United States)	Franks, Robert (I)	2.01 m (6 ft 7 in)	102 kg (225 lb)
G	1	(United States)	Cleveland, Antonius (I)	1.96 m (6 ft 5 in)	90 kg (198 lb)
G	2	(Australia)	Roxburgh, Fraser (DP)	1.96 m (6 ft 5 in)	93 kg (205 lb)
G/F	3	(Australia)	Drmic, Anthony	1.98 m (6 ft 6 in)	93 kg (205 lb)
C	7	(South Sudan)	Acuoth, Deng	2.08 m (6 ft 10 in)	90 kg (198 lb)
F	9	(Australia)	Marshall, Nick (DP)	1.98 m (6 ft 6 in)	93 kg (205 lb)
G	10	(Australia)	McCarron, Mitch (C)	1.89 m (6 ft 2 in)	94 kg (207 lb)
C	11	(Philippines)	Sotto, Kai (SRP)	2.20 m (7 ft 3 in)	105 kg (231 lb)
F/C	13	(Australia)	Thew, Cameron (DP)	2.08 m (6 ft 10 in)	103 kg (227 lb)
F	14	(Australia)	Galloway, Kyrin	2.03 m (6 ft 8 in)	98 kg (216 lb)
G	20	(United States)	Clark, Ian (I)	1.91 m (6 ft 3 in)	79 kg (174 lb)
F	21	(Australia)	Johnson, Daniel	2.12 m (6 ft 11 in)	108 kg (238 lb)
F	22	(New Zealand)	Harris, Hyrum	2.04 m (6 ft 8 in)	110 kg (243 lb)
G	32	(Australia)	Ipassou, Fiston (DP)	1.96 m (6 ft 5 in)	93 kg (205 lb)
G	44	(South Sudan)	Dech, Sunday	1.95 m (6 ft 5 in)	93 kg (205 lb)

Head coach

- (Australia) C. J. Bruton

Assistant coach(es)

- (Australia) Jamie Pearlman
- (Australia) Mick Downer

Legend

- (C) Team captain
- (DP) Development player
- (IN) Inactive
- (I) Import player
- (SRP) Special restricted player
- (NS) Next Star player
- Injured

- Roster
Updated: 20 December 2022

== Standings ==
=== Ladder ===
Pos	2022–23 NBL season											
Pos	Team	Pld	W	L	PCT	Last 5	Streak	Home	Away	PF	PA	PP
1	Sydney Kings	28	19	9	67.86%	2–3	L2	10–4	9–5	2679	2468	108.55%
2	New Zealand Breakers	28	18	10	64.29%	5–0	W5	7–7	11–3	2423	2246	107.88%
3	Cairns Taipans	28	18	10	64.29%	2–3	W1	8–6	10–4	2455	2376	103.32%
4	Tasmania JackJumpers	28	16	12	57.14%	3–2	W2	7–7	9–5	2385	2305	103.47%
5	S.E. Melbourne Phoenix	28	15	13	53.57%	3–2	L1	11–3	4–10	2553	2512	101.63%
6	Perth Wildcats	28	15	13	53.57%	2–3	W1	9–5	6–8	2580	2568	100.47%
7	Melbourne United	28	15	13	53.57%	4–1	W1	8–6	7–7	2434	2424	100.41%
8	Adelaide 36ers	28	13	15	46.43%	2–3	L1	8–6	5–9	2546	2597	98.04%
9	Brisbane Bullets	28	8	20	28.57%	2–3	L3	4–10	4–10	2365	2600	90.96%
10	Illawarra Hawks	28	3	25	10.71%	1–4	L4	2–12	1–13	2261	2585	87.47%

Updated to match(es) played on 5 February 2023. Source: NBL.com.au

The NBL tie-breaker system as outlined in the NBL Rules and Regulations states that in the case of an identical win–loss record, the overall points percentage will determine order of seeding.

=== Ladder progression ===
Leader and qualification to semifinals
Qualification to semifinals
Qualification to play-in games
Last place

2022–23 NBL season
Team ╲ Round	1	2	3	4	5	6	7	8	9	10	11	12	13	14	15	16	17	18
Adelaide 36ers	—	—	7	4	8	8	7	6	6	7	7	7	7	5	8	8	8	8
Brisbane Bullets	9	9	10	9	9	9	9	9	8	9	9	9	9	9	9	9	9	9
Cairns Taipans	1	3	4	3	4	3	3	3	3	4	3	4	3	3	2	2	2	3
Illawarra Hawks	7	6	9	10	10	10	10	10	10	10	10	10	10	10	10	10	10	10
Melbourne United	5	5	6	8	6	6	8	8	9	8	8	8	8	8	6	7	7	7
New Zealand Breakers	6	4	3	2	1	2	2	1	2	2	1	2	2	2	3	3	3	2
Perth Wildcats	2	1	2	5	7	7	5	7	7	6	5	6	5	7	5	5	5	6
S.E. Melbourne Phoenix	4	7	8	7	3	4	4	4	4	3	4	3	4	6	7	6	6	5
Sydney Kings	3	2	1	1	2	1	1	2	1	1	2	1	1	1	1	1	1	1
Tasmania JackJumpers	8	8	5	6	5	5	6	5	5	5	6	5	6	4	4	4	4	4

Updated to match(es) played on 5 February 2023. Source: NBL.com.au

== Game log ==
=== Pre-season ===
2022 pre-season game log
Total: 1–3 (Home: 0–0; Road: 1–3)
September: 0–2 (Home: 0–0; Road: 0–2)

Game	Date	Team	Score	High points	High rebounds	High assists	Location Attendance	Record
1	9 September	@ Perth	L 98–87	Antonius Cleveland (23)	Kai Sotto (11)	Marshall, Randall II (4)	Eaton Recreration Centre; 300	0–1
2	11 September	@ Perth	L 97–91	Craig Randall II (29)	Antonius Cleveland (9)	Mitch McCarron (6)	HBF Arena; 500	0–2

October: 1–1 (Home: 0–0; Road: 1–1)

Game	Date	Team	Score	High points	High rebounds	High assists	Location Attendance	Record
3	2 October	@ Phoenix	W 134–124	Craig Randall II (35)	Mitch McCarron (9)	Mitch McCarron (16)	Footprint Center; 15,152	1–2
4	6 October	@ Oklahoma City	L 98–131	Craig Randall II (27)	Robert Franks (7)	Craig Randall II (8)	Paycom Center not available	1–3

=== NBL Blitz ===
2022 NBL Blitz game log
Total: 3–0 (Home: 1–0; Road: 2–0)
September: 3–0 (Home: 1–0; Road: 2–0)

Game	Date	Team	Score	High points	High rebounds	High assists	Location Attendance	Record
1	16 September	@ S.E. Melbourne	W 76–84	Craig Randall II (16)	Mitch McCarron (8)	Mitch McCarron (5)	Darwin Basketball Facility not available	1–0
2	19 September	Tasmania	W 87–79	Antonius Cleveland (27)	Sunday Dech (9)	Cleveland, Dech, McCarron (3)	Darwin Basketball Facility; 838	2–0
3	22 September	@ Illawarra	W 77–84	Robert Franks (30)	Daniel Johnson (11)	Sunday Dech (7)	Darwin Basketball Facility; 912	3–0

=== Regular season ===
2022–23 game log
Total: 13–15 (Home: 8–6; Road: 5–9)
October: 2–3 (Home: 1–2; Road: 1–1)

Game	Date	Team	Score	High points	High rebounds	High assists	Location Attendance	Record
1	13 October	Tasmania	L 72–97	Craig Randall II (18)	Mitch McCarron (6)	Mitch McCarron (5)	Adelaide Entertainment Centre; 8,027	0–1
2	15 October	Illawarra	W 90–80	Craig Randall II (28)	Robert Franks (9)	Daniel Johnson (8)	Adelaide Entertainment Centre; 8,143	1–1
3	21 October	@ Sydney	W 88–92	Craig Randall II (24)	Daniel Johnson (8)	Craig Randall II (5)	Qudos Bank Arena; 8,154	2–1
4	28 October	New Zealand	L 70–99	Kai Sotto (16)	Kai Sotto (7)	Dech, McCarron (3)	Adelaide Entertainment Centre; 6,717	2–2
5	30 October	@ S.E. Melbourne	L 103–98 (OT)	Craig Randall II (28)	Franks, McCarron (9)	Cleveland, Franks, Randall (3)	John Cain Arena; 7,195	2–3

November: 3–2 (Home: 0–1; Road: 3–1)

Game	Date	Team	Score	High points	High rebounds	High assists	Location Attendance	Record
6	3 November	@ Illawarra	W 80–96	Daniel Johnson (28)	Daniel Johnson (7)	Mitch McCarron (7)	WIN Entertainment Centre; 2,118	3–3
7	5 November	Perth	L 89–94	Robert Franks (24)	Robert Franks (9)	Daniel Johnson (5)	Adelaide Entertainment Centre; 9,071	3–4
8	17 November	@ Melbourne	W 86–91	Drmic, Franks (21)	Robert Franks (11)	Mitch McCarron (5)	John Cain Arena; 5,100	4–4
9	20 November	@ New Zealand	L 89–83	Antonius Cleveland (17)	Mitch McCarron (9)	Antonius Cleveland (6)	The Trusts Arena; 2,909	4–5
10	24 November	@ Perth	W 82–96	Robert Franks (21)	Franks, Johnson (8)	Drmic, McCarron (6)	RAC Arena; 10,329	5–5

December: 5–4 (Home: 5–1; Road: 0–3)

Game	Date	Team	Score	High points	High rebounds	High assists	Location Attendance	Record
11	2 December	Cairns	W 78–75	Antonius Cleveland (23)	Daniel Johnson (9)	Sunday Dech (5)	Adelaide Entertainment Centre; 7,198	6–5
12	4 December	@ Sydney	L 97–78	Daniel Johnson (21)	Antonius Cleveland (6)	Mitch McCarron (5)	Qudos Bank Arena; 9,389	6–6
13	9 December	Perth	L 90–98	Mitch McCarron (20)	Mitch McCarron (13)	Mitch McCarron (6)	Adelaide Entertainment Centre; 5,436	6–7
14	11 December	@ S.E. Melbourne	L 102–84	Robert Franks (18)	Mitch McCarron (9)	Mitch McCarron (4)	John Cain Arena; 4,820	6–8
15	17 December	Brisbane	W 108–77	Robert Franks (25)	Antonius Cleveland (9)	Dech, McCarron (4)	Adelaide Entertainment Centre; 6,003	7–8
16	19 December	Tasmania	W 93–82	Antonius Cleveland (20)	Antonius Cleveland (10)	Mitch McCarron (5)	Adelaide Entertainment Centre; 7,010	8–8
17	24 December	S.E. Melbourne	W 94–88	Franks, Johnson (20)	Antonius Cleveland (11)	Antonius Cleveland (5)	Adelaide Entertainment Centre; 6,033	9–8
18	29 December	Brisbane	W 87–84	Robert Franks (18)	Anthony Drmic (11)	Antonius Cleveland (5)	Adelaide Entertainment Centre; 9,263	10–8
19	31 December	@ Cairns	L 86–83	Antonius Cleveland (16)	Robert Franks (8)	Mitch McCarron (5)	Cairns Convention Centre; 4,851	10–9

January: 2–5 (Home: 1–2; Road: 1–3)

Game	Date	Team	Score	High points	High rebounds	High assists	Location Attendance	Record
20	6 January	Illawarra	W 103–95	Daniel Johnson (18)	Daniel Johnson (8)	Clark, Cleveland (5)	Adelaide Entertainment Centre; 9,308	11–9
21	8 January	New Zealand	L 83–85	Robert Franks (20)	Robert Franks (13)	Mitch McCarron (4)	Adelaide Entertainment Centre; 9,368	11–10
22	12 January	@ Tasmania	L 98–82	Robert Franks (24)	Kai Sotto (7)	Ian Clark (6)	MyState Bank Arena; 4,293	11–11
23	14 January	@ Perth	L 112–97	Robert Franks (25)	Antonius Cleveland (6)	Antonius Cleveland (4)	RAC Arena; 13,087	11–12
24	19 January	@ Brisbane	L 106–101 (OT)	Anthony Drmic (20)	Harris, Sotto (7)	Ian Clark (8)	Nissan Arena; 3,953	11–13
25	21 January	Melbourne	L 87–94	Robert Franks (24)	Robert Franks (10)	Robert Franks (6)	Adelaide Entertainment Centre; 9,505	11–14
26	30 January	@ Cairns	W 96–99	Antonius Cleveland (27)	Robert Franks (9)	Franks, McCarron (5)	Cairns Convention Centre; 3,530	12–14

February: 1–1 (Home: 1–0; Road: 0–1)

Game	Date	Team	Score	High points	High rebounds	High assists	Location Attendance	Record
27	3 February	Sydney	W 115–108	Antonius Cleveland (23)	Kai Sotto (7)	Antonius Cleveland (7)	Adelaide Entertainment Centre; 9,558	13–14
28	5 February	@ Melbourne	L 116–107	Antonius Cleveland (30)	Antonius Cleveland (6)	Clark, Dech (4)	John Cain Arena; 10,175	13–15

2022–23 season schedule

== Transactions ==
=== Re-signed ===
Player	Signed
Sunday Dech	29 April
Hyrum Harris	3 May
Nick Marshall	17 May
Kai Sotto	29 July

=== Additions ===
Player	Signed	Former team
Anthony Drmic	26 May	Brisbane Bullets
Kyrin Galloway	27 May	New Zealand Breakers
Antonius Cleveland	9 June	Illawarra Hawks
Robert Franks	10 June	Brisbane Bullets
Craig Randall II	8 August	Long Island Nets
Deng Acuoth	10 August	Knox Raiders
Cameron Thew	1 September	Northside Wizards
Fiston Ipassou	1 September	Forestville Eagles
Fraser Roxburgh	1 September	Knox Raiders
Ian Clark	20 December	Sydney Kings

=== Subtractions ===
Player	Reason left	New team
Isaac Humphries	Free agent	Melbourne United
Cameron Bairstow	Retired	N/A
Isaac Gattorna	Free agent	Sydney Kings
Lachlan Olbrich	Collage	UC Riverside Highlanders
Todd Withers	Free agent	Rytas Vilnius
Mojave King	Free agent	NBA G League Ignite
Craig Randall II	Released	N/A

== Awards ==
=== Club awards ===
- Most Improved: Nick Marshall
- Coaches Award: Anthony Drmic
- Members Choice: Antonius Cleveland
- Best Defensive Player: Antonius Cleveland
- Chairman's Award: Jared Campbell
- Club MVP: Antonius Cleveland

== See also ==
- 2022–23 NBL season
- Adelaide 36ers
