= 2022–23 Melbourne United season =

- Head coach: (Australia) Dean Vickerman
- Captain: (Australia) Chris Goulding
- Arena: John Cain Arena

NBL results
- Record: 15–13 (53.6%)
- Ladder: 7th
- Finals finish: Did not qualify
- Stats at NBL.com.au

Player records
- Points: (United States) Tucker 18.1
- Rebounds: (United States) Lee 7.5
- Assists: (Canada) Rathan-Mayes 4.5
- All statistics correct as of 5 February 2023.

The 2022–23 Melbourne United season was the 40th season of the franchise in the National Basketball League (NBL), and their 9th under the banner of Melbourne United.

== Roster ==
Note: Flags indicate national team eligibility at FIBA-sanctioned events. Players may hold other non-FIBA nationalities not displayed.

2022–23 Melbourne United roster
Players
Coaches

Pos.	No.	Nat.	Name	Ht.	Wt.
G	1	(Australia)	Triplett, Zac (DP)	1.98 m (6 ft 6 in)	85 kg (187 lb)
G	2	(Australia)	Blogg, Campbell (TP)	1.94 m (6 ft 4 in)	88 kg (194 lb)
G/F	4	(Australia)	Newley, Brad	1.98 m (6 ft 6 in)	96 kg (212 lb)
G	5	(Australia)	Duach, Joshua (DP)	1.96 m (6 ft 5 in)	86 kg (190 lb)
C	7	(Australia)	Humphries, Isaac	2.11 m (6 ft 11 in)	116 kg (256 lb)
F	9	(South Sudan)	Machar, Malith (DP)	1.98 m (6 ft 6 in)	77 kg (170 lb)
G	11	(Canada)	Rathan-Mayes, Xavier (I)	1.93 m (6 ft 4 in)	91 kg (201 lb)
F/C	12	(Australia)	Dalton, Callum (DP)	2.06 m (6 ft 9 in)	115 kg (254 lb)
F	13	(Australia)	Maluach, Makuach	2.00 m (6 ft 7 in)	87 kg (192 lb)
C	15	(Germany)	Hukporti, Ariel (injured) (NS)	2.13 m (7 ft 0 in)	113 kg (249 lb)
F	20	(Australia)	Barlow, David (injured)	2.05 m (6 ft 9 in)	103 kg (227 lb)
F	22	(Australia)	Peatling, Mason	2.03 m (6 ft 8 in)	105 kg (231 lb)
F/C	24	(United States)	Lee, Marcus (I)	2.11 m (6 ft 11 in)	102 kg (225 lb)
F	35	(Australia)	Okwera, David	2.08 m (6 ft 10 in)	90 kg (198 lb)
G	38	(Australia)	Barker, Lachlan (TP)	1.88 m (6 ft 2 in)	83 kg (183 lb)
G	43	(Australia)	Goulding, Chris (C)	1.92 m (6 ft 4 in)	92 kg (203 lb)
G	51	(New Zealand)	Ili, Shea (injured)	1.84 m (6 ft 0 in)	87 kg (192 lb)
G	59	(United States)	Tucker, Rayjon (I)	1.91 m (6 ft 3 in)	95 kg (209 lb)

Head coach

- (Australia) Dean Vickerman

Assistant coach(es)

- (Australia) Rhys Carter
- (Australia) Darryl McDonald
- (Australia) Justin Schueller

Team manager

- (Australia) Stephan Semerci

Legend

- (C) Team captain
- (DP) Development player
- (IN) Inactive
- (I) Import player
- (TP) Training player
- (SRP) Special restricted player
- (NS) Next Star player
- Injured

- Roster
Updated: 26 January 2023

== Standings ==
=== Ladder ===
Pos	2022–23 NBL season											
Pos	Team	Pld	W	L	PCT	Last 5	Streak	Home	Away	PF	PA	PP
1	Sydney Kings	28	19	9	67.86%	2–3	L2	10–4	9–5	2679	2468	108.55%
2	New Zealand Breakers	28	18	10	64.29%	5–0	W5	7–7	11–3	2423	2246	107.88%
3	Cairns Taipans	28	18	10	64.29%	2–3	W1	8–6	10–4	2455	2376	103.32%
4	Tasmania JackJumpers	28	16	12	57.14%	3–2	W2	7–7	9–5	2385	2305	103.47%
5	S.E. Melbourne Phoenix	28	15	13	53.57%	3–2	L1	11–3	4–10	2553	2512	101.63%
6	Perth Wildcats	28	15	13	53.57%	2–3	W1	9–5	6–8	2580	2568	100.47%
7	Melbourne United	28	15	13	53.57%	4–1	W1	8–6	7–7	2434	2424	100.41%
8	Adelaide 36ers	28	13	15	46.43%	2–3	L1	8–6	5–9	2546	2597	98.04%
9	Brisbane Bullets	28	8	20	28.57%	2–3	L3	4–10	4–10	2365	2600	90.96%
10	Illawarra Hawks	28	3	25	10.71%	1–4	L4	2–12	1–13	2261	2585	87.47%

Updated to match(es) played on 5 February 2023. Source: NBL.com.au

The NBL tie-breaker system as outlined in the NBL Rules and Regulations states that in the case of an identical win–loss record, the overall points percentage will determine order of seeding.

=== Ladder progression ===
Leader and qualification to semifinals
Qualification to semifinals
Qualification to play-in games
Last place

2022–23 NBL season
Team ╲ Round	1	2	3	4	5	6	7	8	9	10	11	12	13	14	15	16	17	18
Adelaide 36ers	—	—	7	4	8	8	7	6	6	7	7	7	7	5	8	8	8	8
Brisbane Bullets	9	9	10	9	9	9	9	9	8	9	9	9	9	9	9	9	9	9
Cairns Taipans	1	3	4	3	4	3	3	3	3	4	3	4	3	3	2	2	2	3
Illawarra Hawks	7	6	9	10	10	10	10	10	10	10	10	10	10	10	10	10	10	10
Melbourne United	5	5	6	8	6	6	8	8	9	8	8	8	8	8	6	7	7	7
New Zealand Breakers	6	4	3	2	1	2	2	1	2	2	1	2	2	2	3	3	3	2
Perth Wildcats	2	1	2	5	7	7	5	7	7	6	5	6	5	7	5	5	5	6
S.E. Melbourne Phoenix	4	7	8	7	3	4	4	4	4	3	4	3	4	6	7	6	6	5
Sydney Kings	3	2	1	1	2	1	1	2	1	1	2	1	1	1	1	1	1	1
Tasmania JackJumpers	8	8	5	6	5	5	6	5	5	5	6	5	6	4	4	4	4	4

Updated to match(es) played on 5 February 2023. Source: NBL.com.au

== Game log ==
=== Pre-season ===
2022 pre-season game log
Total: 0–3 (Home: 0–3; Road: 0–0)
August: 0–1 (Home: 0–1; Road: 0–0)

Game	Date	Team	Score	High points	High rebounds	High assists	Location Attendance	Record
1	9 August	Saint Mary's	L 67–88	Shea Ili (18)	Brad Newley (5)	Joshua Duach (3)	Keilor Stadium; 1,000	0–1

September: 0–2 (Home: 0–2; Road: 0–0)

Game	Date	Team	Score	High points	High rebounds	High assists	Location Attendance	Record
2	8 September	Brisbane	L 77–105	Rayjon Tucker (20)	Rayjon Tucker (8)	Xavier Rathan-Mayes (4)	Selkirk Stadium; 2,000	0–2
3	10 September	Brisbane	L 72–76	Rayjon Tucker (28)	Rayjon Tucker (9)	Brad Newley (2)	Casey Stadium; 1,100	0–3

=== NBL Blitz ===
2022 NBL Blitz game log
Total: 2–1 (Home: 2–0; Road: 0–1)
September: 2–1 (Home: 2–0; Road: 0–1)

Game	Date	Team	Score	High points	High rebounds	High assists	Location Attendance	Record
1	18 September	@ Illawarra	L 81–68	Rayjon Tucker (20)	Ariel Hukporti (8)	Rayjon Tucker (3)	Darwin Basketball Facility; 922	0–1
2	21 September	Perth	W 90–63	Xavier Rathan-Mayes (22)	Jordan Caroline (14)	Caroline, Humphries, Tucker (3)	Darwin Basketball Facility; 917	1–1
3	23 September	Brisbane	W 80–67	Chris Goulding (19)	Rayjon Tucker (8)	Xavier Rathan-Mayes (4)	Darwin Basketball Facility; 906	2–1

=== Regular season ===
2022–23 game log
Total: 15–13 (Home: 8–6; Road: 7–7)
October: 4–4 (Home: 2–4; Road: 2–0)

Game	Date	Team	Score	High points	High rebounds	High assists	Location Attendance	Record
1	2 October	New Zealand	W 101–97 (OT)	Xavier Rathan-Mayes (33)	Isaac Humphries (6)	Xavier Rathan-Mayes (9)	John Cain Arena; 7,236	1–0
2	9 October	Sydney	L 71–91	Barker, Caroline (10)	Jordan Caroline (10)	Rayjon Tucker (3)	John Cain Arena; 7,881	1–1
3	14 October	@ Perth	W 81–84	Humphries, Rathan-Mayes (17)	Xavier Rathan-Mayes (11)	Goulding, Rathan-Mayes (5)	RAC Arena; 10,441	2–1
4	16 October	Tasmania	L 64–74	Xavier Rathan-Mayes (18)	Barlow, Rathan-Mayes (7)	David Barlow (4)	John Cain Arena; 7,292	2–2
5	20 October	Cairns	L 77–81	Xavier Rathan-Mayes (21)	Rayjon Tucker (10)	Goulding, Rathan-Mayes (3)	John Cain Arena; 4,449	2–3
6	23 October	Sydney	L 69–87	Rayjon Tucker (20)	Rayjon Tucker (10)	Xavier Rathan-Mayes (7)	John Cain Arena; 10,300	2–4
7	29 October	@ Illawarra	W 100–106 (2OT)	Xavier Rathan-Mayes (32)	Rayjon Tucker (13)	Chris Goulding (5)	WIN Entertainment Centre; 3,139	3–4
8	31 October	Perth	W 94–77	Xavier Rathan-Mayes (25)	Xavier Rathan-Mayes (10)	Chris Goulding (5)	John Cain Arena; 6,610	4–4

November: 1–4 (Home: 1–2; Road: 0–2)

Game	Date	Team	Score	High points	High rebounds	High assists	Location Attendance	Record
9	4 November	@ Cairns	L 97–72	Isaac Humphries (17)	Isaac Humphries (8)	Goulding, Newley (4)	Cairns Convention Centre; 3,704	4–5
10	6 November	S.E. Melbourne	W 110–85	Chris Goulding (30)	Xavier Rathan-Mayes (6)	Xavier Rathan-Mayes (8)	John Cain Arena; 10,300	5–5
11	17 November	Adelaide	L 86–91	Rayjon Tucker (23)	Isaac Humphries (6)	Isaac Humphries (4)	John Cain Arena; 5,100	5–6
12	19 November	@ S.E. Melbourne	L 84–69	Rayjon Tucker (22)	Xavier Rathan-Mayes (8)	Xavier Rathan-Mayes (7)	John Cain Arena; 10,175	5–7
13	26 November	Tasmania	L 90–94	Rayjon Tucker (23)	Rayjon Tucker (10)	Xavier Rathan-Mayes (6)	John Cain Arena; 6,263	5–8

December: 4–4 (Home: 4–0; Road: 0–4)

Game	Date	Team	Score	High points	High rebounds	High assists	Location Attendance	Record
14	3 December	@ S.E. Melbourne	L 78–72	Xavier Rathan-Mayes (15)	Mason Peatling (11)	Xavier Rathan-Mayes (7)	John Cain Arena; 5,651	5–9
15	5 December	@ Illawarra	L 93–79	Rayjon Tucker (27)	Marcus Lee (6)	Goulding, Okwera, Rathan-Mayes (3)	WIN Entertainment Centre; 2,248	5–10
16	10 December	Brisbane	W 104–88	Goulding, Tucker (20)	Isaac Humphries (7)	Xavier Rathan-Mayes (10)	John Cain Arena; 5,788	6–10
17	12 December	@ Perth	L 90–89	Xavier Rathan-Mayes (22)	Humphries, Lee, Tucker (8)	Ili, Peatling, Rathan-Mayes, Tucker (3)	RAC Arena; 10,459	6–11
18	15 December	S.E. Melbourne	W 92–76	Rayjon Tucker (33)	Xavier Rathan-Mayes (9)	Xavier Rathan-Mayes (5)	John Cain Arena; 6,228	7–11
19	18 December	Illawarra	W 88–77	Chris Goulding (25)	Mason Peatling (11)	Shea Ili (7)	John Cain Arena; 6,806	8–11
20	23 December	Cairns	W 84–81	Rayjon Tucker (27)	Marcus Lee (10)	Peatling, Rathan-Mayes (4)	John Cain Arena; 10,175	9–11
21	25 December	@ Sydney	L 101–80	Rayjon Tucker (31)	David Okwera (12)	Shea Ili (7)	Qudos Bank Arena; 7,012	9–12

January: 5–1 (Home: 0–0; Road: 5–1)

Game	Date	Team	Score	High points	High rebounds	High assists	Location Attendance	Record
22	1 January	@ Brisbane	W 86–99	Goulding, Tucker (20)	Isaac Humphries (9)	Xavier Rathan-Mayes (6)	Nissan Arena; 4,781	10–12
23	7 January	@ Tasmania	W 85–92	Chris Goulding (23)	Marcus Lee (10)	Shea Ili (8)	MyState Bank Arena; 4,269	11–12
24	12 January	@ New Zealand	W 65–77	Xavier Rathan-Mayes (20)	Marcus Lee (9)	Marcus Lee (5)	Christchurch Arena; 5,217	12–12
25	14 January	@ Brisbane	W 91–101	Rayjon Tucker (30)	Marcus Lee (6)	Shea Ili (7)	Nissan Arena; 4,703	13–12
26	21 January	@ Adelaide	W 87–94	Chris Goulding (28)	Rayjon Tucker (10)	Shea Ili (5)	Adelaide Entertainment Centre; 9,505	14–12
27	28 January	@ New Zealand	L 80–74	Xavier Rathan-Mayes (15)	Lee, Rathan-Mayes (7)	Marcus Lee (3)	Spark Arena; 6,488	14–13

February: 1–0 (Home: 1–0; Road: 0–0)

Game	Date	Team	Score	High points	High rebounds	High assists	Location Attendance	Record
28	5 February	Adelaide	W 116–107	Rayjon Tucker (31)	Humphries, Lee (9)	Rathan-Mayes, Tucker (5)	John Cain Arena; 10,175	15–13

2022–23 season schedule

== Transactions ==
=== Re-signed ===
Player	Signed
Ariel Hukporti	27 April
Jack White	6 May
Brad Newley	18 May
Shea Ili	26 July
Chris Goulding	25 August
David Barlow	16 September
Callum Dalton	20 September

=== Additions ===
Player	Signed	Former team
Makuach Maluach	20 May	Darwin Salties
Joshua Duach	23 June	Iona Gaels
Isaac Humphries	22 July	Adelaide 36ers
Rayjon Tucker	2 August	Milwaukee Bucks
Xavier Rathan-Mayes	3 August	Illawarra Hawks
Jordan Caroline	4 August	Dolomiti Energia Trento
Malith Machar	8 August	Forestville Eagles
Lachlan Barker	20 September	S.E. Melbourne Phoenix
Campbell Blogg	20 September	Sandringham Sabres
Marcus Lee	16 November	Bàsquet Manresa

=== Subtractions ===
Player	Reason left	New team
Caleb Agada	Free agent	Prometey Slobozhanske
Jack White	Released	Denver Nuggets
Matthew Dellavedova	Released	Sacramento Kings
William Hickey	Free agent	Illawarra Hawks
David Barlow	Retired	N/A
Dion Prewster	Free agent	Sandringham Sabres
Jo Lual-Acuil	Free agent	Nanjing Tongxi Monkey Kings
Jordan Caroline	Released	Bàsquet Manresa

== Awards ==
=== Club awards ===
- SHARE Award: Callum Dalton
- Defensive Player: Marcus Lee
- Vince Crivelli Club Person of the Year: Nicola Parkinson
- Club MVP: Chris Goulding

== See also ==
- 2022–23 NBL season
- Melbourne United
