= 2022–23 New Zealand Breakers season =

- Head coach: (Israel) Mody Maor
- Captain: (New Zealand) Thomas Abercrombie
- Arena: Spark Arena

NBL results
- Record: 18–10 (64.3%)
- Ladder: 2nd
- Finals finish: Runners-up (lost to Kings 2–3)
- Stats at NBL.com.au

Player records
- Points: (United States) Brown Jr. 19.5
- Rebounds: (United States) Pardon 8.0
- Assists: (Australia) McDowell-White 6.2
- All statistics correct as of 15 March 2023.

The 2022–23 New Zealand Breakers season was the 20th season of the franchise in the National Basketball League (NBL), and their first under the leadership of their new head coach Mody Maor.

== Roster ==
Note: Flags indicate national team eligibility at FIBA-sanctioned events. Players may hold other non-FIBA nationalities not displayed.

2022–23 New Zealand Breakers roster
Players
Coaches

Pos.	No.	Nat.	Name	Ht.	Wt.
F	0	(United States)	Pardon, Dererk (I)	2.03 m (6 ft 8 in)	107 kg (236 lb)
F	1	(United States)	Brantley, Jarrell (I)	2.01 m (6 ft 7 in)	113 kg (249 lb)
G	2	(New Zealand)	Le'afa, Izayah	1.88 m (6 ft 2 in)	92 kg (203 lb)
G	3	(Australia)	Gliddon, Cameron	1.97 m (6 ft 6 in)	94 kg (207 lb)
F	5	(United States)	Brown Jr., Barry (I)	1.91 m (6 ft 3 in)	88 kg (194 lb)
G	7	(Australia)	McDowell-White, Will	1.96 m (6 ft 5 in)	84 kg (185 lb)
G	9	(New Zealand)	McNaught, Alex (DP)	1.85 m (6 ft 1 in)	90 kg (198 lb)
G/F	10	(New Zealand)	Abercrombie, Thomas (C)	1.98 m (6 ft 6 in)	90 kg (198 lb)
F	12	(France)	Rupert, Rayan (NS)	1.99 m (6 ft 6 in)	87 kg (192 lb)
F	13	(New Zealand)	Vodanovich, Tom	2.01 m (6 ft 7 in)	104 kg (229 lb)
F/C	15	(New Zealand)	Loe, Robert	2.11 m (6 ft 11 in)	115 kg (254 lb)
F	19	(New Zealand)	Davidson, Isaac (TP)	2.02 m (6 ft 8 in)	100 kg (220 lb)
F/C	33	(New Zealand)	Timmins, Sam	2.11 m (6 ft 11 in)	120 kg (265 lb)
F	42	(New Zealand)	Fotu, Dan	2.03 m (6 ft 8 in)	100 kg (220 lb)
G	44	(New Zealand)	Bezzant, Jayden (TP)	1.88 m (6 ft 2 in)	84 kg (185 lb)
F	77	(United States)	Brantley, Jamaal (IN)	1.98 m (6 ft 6 in)	106 kg (234 lb)

Head coach

- (Israel) Mody Maor

Assistant coach(es)

- (France) Bastien Cadot
- (United States) James Reid
- (United States) Daniel Sokolovsky
- (Israel) Roei Rotenberg

Strength & conditioning coach(es)

- (New Zealand) Emily Nolan

Legend

- (C) Team captain
- (DP) Development player
- (IN) Inactive
- (I) Import player
- (SRP) Special restricted player
- (NS) Next Star player
- Injured

- Roster
Updated: 26 January 2023

== Standings ==
=== Ladder ===
Pos	2022–23 NBL season											
Pos	Team	Pld	W	L	PCT	Last 5	Streak	Home	Away	PF	PA	PP
1	Sydney Kings	28	19	9	67.86%	2–3	L2	10–4	9–5	2679	2468	108.55%
2	New Zealand Breakers	28	18	10	64.29%	5–0	W5	7–7	11–3	2423	2246	107.88%
3	Cairns Taipans	28	18	10	64.29%	2–3	W1	8–6	10–4	2455	2376	103.32%
4	Tasmania JackJumpers	28	16	12	57.14%	3–2	W2	7–7	9–5	2385	2305	103.47%
5	S.E. Melbourne Phoenix	28	15	13	53.57%	3–2	L1	11–3	4–10	2553	2512	101.63%
6	Perth Wildcats	28	15	13	53.57%	2–3	W1	9–5	6–8	2580	2568	100.47%
7	Melbourne United	28	15	13	53.57%	4–1	W1	8–6	7–7	2434	2424	100.41%
8	Adelaide 36ers	28	13	15	46.43%	2–3	L1	8–6	5–9	2546	2597	98.04%
9	Brisbane Bullets	28	8	20	28.57%	2–3	L3	4–10	4–10	2365	2600	90.96%
10	Illawarra Hawks	28	3	25	10.71%	1–4	L4	2–12	1–13	2261	2585	87.47%

Updated to match(es) played on 5 February 2023. Source: NBL.com.au

The NBL tie-breaker system as outlined in the NBL Rules and Regulations states that in the case of an identical win–loss record, the overall points percentage will determine order of seeding.

=== Ladder progression ===
Leader and qualification to semifinals
Qualification to semifinals
Qualification to play-in games
Last place

2022–23 NBL season
Team ╲ Round	1	2	3	4	5	6	7	8	9	10	11	12	13	14	15	16	17	18
Adelaide 36ers	—	—	7	4	8	8	7	6	6	7	7	7	7	5	8	8	8	8
Brisbane Bullets	9	9	10	9	9	9	9	9	8	9	9	9	9	9	9	9	9	9
Cairns Taipans	1	3	4	3	4	3	3	3	3	4	3	4	3	3	2	2	2	3
Illawarra Hawks	7	6	9	10	10	10	10	10	10	10	10	10	10	10	10	10	10	10
Melbourne United	5	5	6	8	6	6	8	8	9	8	8	8	8	8	6	7	7	7
New Zealand Breakers	6	4	3	2	1	2	2	1	2	2	1	2	2	2	3	3	3	2
Perth Wildcats	2	1	2	5	7	7	5	7	7	6	5	6	5	7	5	5	5	6
S.E. Melbourne Phoenix	4	7	8	7	3	4	4	4	4	3	4	3	4	6	7	6	6	5
Sydney Kings	3	2	1	1	2	1	1	2	1	1	2	1	1	1	1	1	1	1
Tasmania JackJumpers	8	8	5	6	5	5	6	5	5	5	6	5	6	4	4	4	4	4

Updated to match(es) played on 5 February 2023. Source: NBL.com.au

== Game log ==
=== Pre-season ===
2022 pre-season game log
Total: 1–0 (home: 0–0; road: 0–0)
September: 1–0 (Home: 1–0; Road: 0–0)

Game	Date	Team	Score	High points	High rebounds	High assists	Location Attendance	Record
1	10 September	Illawarra	W 71–68 (OT)	Izayah Le'afa (16)	Dererk Pardon (12)	Will McDowell-White (5)	The Stockyard; 600	1–0

=== NBL Blitz ===
2022 NBL Blitz game log
Total: 0–3 (home: 0–2; road: 0–1)
September: 0–3 (Home: 0–2; Road: 0–1)

Game	Date	Team	Score	High points	High rebounds	High assists	Location Attendance	Record
1	18 September	@ Brisbane	L 81–69	Tom Vodanovich (15)	Jarrell Brantley (8)	Izayah Le'afa (4)	Darwin Basketball Facility; 932	0–1
2	20 September	Illawarra	L 81–85	Rayan Rupert (17)	Dererk Pardon (9)	Izayah Le'afa (9)	Darwin Basketball Facility; 660	0–2
3	23 September	Sydney	L 93–101	Barry Brown (19)	Pardon, Rupert (5)	Brown, Le'afa (4)	Darwin Basketball Facility; 905	0–3

=== Regular season ===
2022–23 game log
Total: 18–10 (home: 7–7; road: 11–3)
October: 6–2 (Home: 2–1; Road: 4–1)

Game	Date	Team	Score	High points	High rebounds	High assists	Location Attendance	Record
1	2 October	@ Melbourne	L 101–97 (OT)	Brown, Pardon (23)	Will McDowell-White (13)	Will McDowell-White (7)	John Cain Arena; 7,236	0–1
2	7 October	Tasmania	W 71–65	Jarrell Brantley (19)	Loe, Pardon (7)	Will McDowell-White (4)	Spark Arena; 5,340	1–1
3	15 October	@ S.E. Melbourne	W 77–85	Robert Loe (18)	Will McDowell-White (7)	Izayah Le'afa (10)	John Cain Arena; 4,364	2–1
4	17 October	@ Illawarra	W 62–88	Will McDowell-White (17)	Will McDowell-White (10)	Will McDowell-White (6)	WIN Entertainment Centre; 2,208	3–1
5	20 October	S.E. Melbourne	L 77–99	Jarrell Brantley (17)	Robert Loe (8)	Izayah Le'afa (4)	The Trusts Arena; 2,288	3–2
6	23 October	@ Cairns	W 64–68	Barry Brown Jr. (24)	Pardon, Vodanovich (8)	Will McDowell-White (4)	Cairns Convention Centre; 4,091	4–2
7	28 October	@ Adelaide	W 70–99	Brantley, Brown (22)	Jarrell Brantley (9)	Will McDowell-White (7)	Adelaide Entertainment Centre; 6,717	5–2
8	30 October	Tasmania	W 94–62	Barry Brown Jr. (24)	Dererk Pardon (14)	Will McDowell-White (7)	Spark Arena; 3,811	6–2

November: 4–1 (Home: 2–1; Road: 2–0)

Game	Date	Team	Score	High points	High rebounds	High assists	Location Attendance	Record
9	6 November	Sydney	L 77–81	Barry Brown Jr. (22)	Will McDowell-White (12)	Izayah Le'afa (4)	Spark Arena; 4,481	6–3
10	18 November	@ Tasmania	W 76–84	Dererk Pardon (19)	Dererk Pardon (10)	Will McDowell-White (6)	Silverdome; 3,122	7–3
11	20 November	Adelaide	W 89–83	Barry Brown Jr. (22)	Brantley, Pardon (10)	Will McDowell-White (7)	The Trusts Arena; 2,909	8–3
12	25 November	@ Cairns	W 71–82	Brantley, Brown (20)	Dererk Pardon (11)	Will McDowell-White (8)	Cairns Convention Centre; 3,661	9–3
13	27 November	Brisbane	W 116–79	Jarrell Brantley (29)	Jarrell Brantley (8)	Brantley, Gliddon, Le'afa (5)	Spark Arena; 3,660	10–3

December: 1–3 (Home: 1–2; Road: 0–1)

Game	Date	Team	Score	High points	High rebounds	High assists	Location Attendance	Record
14	1 December	S.E. Melbourne	W 110–84	Barry Brown Jr. (31)	Dererk Pardon (10)	Will McDowell-White (11)	Christchurch Arena; 3,500	11–3
15	3 December	Perth	L 84–92	Barry Brown Jr. (27)	Dererk Pardon (14)	Will McDowell-White (9)	Spark Arena; 4,884	11–4
16	8 December	Sydney	L 81–88	Izayah Le'afa (17)	Tom Vodanovich (9)	Will McDowell-White (8)	Spark Arena; 3,454	11–5
–	16 December	@ Perth	Postponed (COVID-19) (Makeup date: 10 January)					
–	21 December	@ Brisbane	Postponed (COVID-19) (Makeup date: 4 February)					
17	26 December	@ Tasmania	L 93–82	Izayah Le'afa (21)	Dererk Pardon (8)	Izayah Le'afa (5)	MyState Bank Arena; 4,269	11–6

January: 5–4 (Home: 2–3; Road: 3–1)

Game	Date	Team	Score	High points	High rebounds	High assists	Location Attendance	Record
18	4 January	Perth	W 97–94	Barry Brown Jr. (23)	Abercrombie, Brantley (7)	Barry Brown Jr. (6)	TSB Stadium; 2,200	12–6
19	8 January	@ Adelaide	W 83–85	Barry Brown Jr. (16)	Dererk Pardon (7)	Will McDowell-White (7)	Adelaide Entertainment Centre; 9,368	13–6
20	10 January	@ Perth	L 93–90	Dererk Pardon (28)	Dererk Pardon (12)	Will McDowell-White (8)	RAC Arena; 11,668	13–7
21	12 January	Melbourne	L 65–77	Jarrell Brantley (17)	Will McDowell-White (8)	Will McDowell-White (6)	Christchurch Arena; 5,217	13–8
22	15 January	Cairns	L 83–85	Will McDowell-White (29)	Jarrell Brantley (14)	Will McDowell-White (5)	Spark Arena; 7,194	13–9
23	19 January	Illawarra	L 76–78	Dererk Pardon (19)	Dererk Pardon (17)	Will McDowell-White (7)	Spark Arena; 3,967	13–10
24	22 January	@ Sydney	W 88–93	Jarrell Brantley (30)	Jarrell Brantley (9)	Will McDowell-White (10)	Qudos Bank Arena; 14,232	14–10
25	26 January	@ Brisbane	W 71–99	Jarrell Brantley (22)	Dererk Pardon (9)	Rupert, McDowell-White (4)	Nissan Arena; 3,636	15–10
26	28 January	Melbourne	W 80–74	Jarrell Brantley (18)	Dererk Pardon (8)	Will McDowell-White (6)	Spark Arena; 6,488	16–10

February: 2–0 (Home: 0–0; Road: 2–0)

Game	Date	Team	Score	High points	High rebounds	High assists	Location Attendance	Record
27	2 February	@ Illawarra	W 81–91	Barry Brown Jr. (22)	Abercrombie, Brantley (6)	Le'afa, McDowell-White (4)	WIN Entertainment Centre; 2,039	17–10
28	4 February	@ Brisbane	W 75–80 (OT)	Jarrell Brantley (19)	Will McDowell-White (8)	Will McDowell-White (9)	Nissan Arena; 5,253	18–10

2022–23 season schedule

=== Postseason ===
2023 finals game log
Total: 4–4 (home: 3–1; road: 1–3)
Semifinals: 2–1 (Home: 2–0; Road: 0–1)

Game	Date	Team	Score	High points	High rebounds	High assists	Location Attendance	Record
1	12 February	Tasmania	W 88–68	Dererk Pardon (15)	Dererk Pardon (9)	Will McDowell-White (7)	Spark Arena; 5,479	1–0
2	16 February	@ Tasmania	L 89–78	Barry Brown Jr. (19)	Dererk Pardon (11)	Will McDowell-White (4)	MyState Bank Arena; 4,293	1–1
3	19 February	Tasmania	W 92–77	Barry Brown Jr. (32)	Dererk Pardon (14)	Will McDowell-White (4)	Spark Arena; 6,410	2–1

NBL Finals: 2–3 (Home: 1–1; Road: 1–2)

Game	Date	Team	Score	High points	High rebounds	High assists	Location Attendance	Record
4	3 March	@ Sydney	W 87–95	Brown, McDowell-White (19)	Will McDowell-White (9)	Will McDowell-White (9)	Qudos Bank Arena; 13,145	3–1
5	5 March	Sydney	L 74–81	Barry Brown Jr. (21)	Dererk Pardon (11)	Will McDowell-White (4)	Spark Arena; 8,429	3–2
6	10 March	@ Sydney	L 91–68	Will McDowell-White (11)	Le'afa, McDowell-White (6)	Brown, Le'afa (3)	Qudos Bank Arena; 18,049	3–3
7	12 March	Sydney	W 80–60	Jarrell Brantley (23)	Loe, McDowell-White, Pardon (6)	Will McDowell-White (5)	Spark Arena; 9,742	4–3
6	15 March	@ Sydney	L 77–69	Barry Brown Jr. (22)	Pardon (9)	Will McDowell-White (5)	Qudos Bank Arena; 18,124	4–4

2022–23 season schedule

== Transactions ==
=== Re-signed ===
Player	Signed
Sam Timmins	29 April
Will McDowell-White	25 May

=== Additions ===
Player	Signed	Former team
Dan Fotu	15 May	Saint Mary's Gaels
Tom Vodanovich	29 May	Sydney Kings
Cameron Gliddon	7 June	S.E. Melbourne Phoenix
Rayan Rupert	10 June	Centre Fédéral de Basket-ball
Izayah Le'afa	11 June	S.E. Melbourne Phoenix
Dererk Pardon	15 June	Hapoel Be'er Sheva
Jarrell Brantley	27 July	Leones de Ponce
Alex McNaught	16 August	Nelson Giants
Barry Brown Jr.	30 August	Beijing Ducks
Jamaal Brantley	20 September	Shreveport Mavericks

=== Subtractions ===
Player	Reason left	New team
Yanni Wetzell	Mutual consent	Baskonia
Peyton Siva	Free agent	Panathinaikos
Kyrin Galloway	Free agent	Adelaide 36ers
Hugo Besson	NBA draft	Milwaukee Bucks
Ousmane Dieng	NBA draft	Oklahoma City Thunder
Finn Delany	Free agent	Telekom Baskets Bonn
Rasmus Bach	Free agent	Brisbane Bullets
Jarrell Brantley	Free agent	Utah Jazz

== Awards ==
=== Club awards ===
- Club MVP: Jarrell Brantley
- Defensive Player: Dererk Pardon
- Fan's Memorable Moment: Jarrell Brantley
- Blackwell Community Cup: Junior Breakers staff
- Clubman Award: Emily Nolan
- Member's Choice Award: Barry Brown Jr.

== See also ==
- 2022–23 NBL season
- New Zealand Breakers
