= 2022–23 Perth Wildcats season =

- Head coach: (Australia) John Rillie
- Captain: (Australia) Jesse Wagstaff
- Arena: Perth Arena

NBL results
- Record: 15–13 (53.6%)
- Ladder: 6th
- Finals finish: Play-in finalist (lost to Taipans 78–91)
- Stats at NBL.com.au

Player records
- Points: (United States) Cotton 23.5
- Rebounds: (United States) Thomas 6.1
- Assists: (United States) Cotton 4.8
- All statistics correct as of 12 February 2023.

The 2022–23 Perth Wildcats season was the 42nd season of the franchise in the National Basketball League (NBL), and their first under the leadership of their new head coach John Rillie.

After having qualified for the NBL finals for the 35 consecutive years preceding 2022, the Wildcats' play-in tournament loss to the Cairns Taipans on 12 February 2023 meant that the Wildcats failed to qualify for the NBL finals for a second consecutive season.

== Roster ==
Note: Flags indicate national team eligibility at FIBA-sanctioned events. Players may hold other non-FIBA nationalities not displayed.

2022–23 Perth Wildcats roster
Players
Coaches

Pos.	No.	Nat.	Name	Ht.	Wt.
G	0	(New Zealand)	Webster, Tai (injured)	1.93 m (6 ft 4 in)	89 kg (196 lb)
F	3	(United States)	Thomas, TaShawn (I)	2.03 m (6 ft 8 in)	109 kg (240 lb)
F/C	5	(Australia)	Hayes-Brown, Oliver (DP)	2.08 m (6 ft 10 in)	114 kg (251 lb)
G	8	(Australia)	Norton, Mitch	1.84 m (6 ft 0 in)	90 kg (198 lb)
G	9	(Australia)	Zunic, Kyle	1.88 m (6 ft 2 in)	90 kg (198 lb)
G	10	(New Zealand)	Webster, Corey	1.88 m (6 ft 2 in)	89 kg (196 lb)
G	11	(United States)	Cotton, Bryce (I)	1.82 m (6 ft 0 in)	75 kg (165 lb)
G/F	12	(Australia)	Blanchfield, Todd	1.98 m (6 ft 6 in)	98 kg (216 lb)
G	17	(Australia)	Harris, Michael (DP)	1.93 m (6 ft 4 in)	85 kg (187 lb)
C	20	(New Zealand)	Andrew, Jack (DP)	2.08 m (6 ft 10 in)	110 kg (243 lb)
F/C	22	(South Sudan)	Majok, Majok	2.10 m (6 ft 11 in)	112 kg (247 lb)
G	23	(Australia)	Travers, Luke	2.00 m (6 ft 7 in)	94 kg (207 lb)
F	24	(Australia)	Wagstaff, Jesse (C)	2.03 m (6 ft 8 in)	103 kg (227 lb)
F	25	(Australia)	Shervill, Corey (TP)	2.01 m (6 ft 7 in)	100 kg (220 lb)
F	45	(United States)	Manek, Brady (I)	2.06 m (6 ft 9 in)	104 kg (229 lb)

Head coach

- (Australia) John Rillie

Assistant coach(es)

- (United States) Mike Kelly
- (Australia) Luke Brennan
- (Australia) Keegan Crawford

Strength & conditioning coach(es)

- (Australia) Josh Cavanagh

Legend

- (C) Team captain
- (DP) Development player
- (IN) Inactive
- (I) Import player
- (TP) Training player
- (SRP) Special restricted player
- (NS) Next Star player
- Injured

- Roster
Updated: 12 February 2023

== Standings ==
=== Ladder ===
Pos	2022–23 NBL season											
Pos	Team	Pld	W	L	PCT	Last 5	Streak	Home	Away	PF	PA	PP
1	Sydney Kings	28	19	9	67.86%	2–3	L2	10–4	9–5	2679	2468	108.55%
2	New Zealand Breakers	28	18	10	64.29%	5–0	W5	7–7	11–3	2423	2246	107.88%
3	Cairns Taipans	28	18	10	64.29%	2–3	W1	8–6	10–4	2455	2376	103.32%
4	Tasmania JackJumpers	28	16	12	57.14%	3–2	W2	7–7	9–5	2385	2305	103.47%
5	S.E. Melbourne Phoenix	28	15	13	53.57%	3–2	L1	11–3	4–10	2553	2512	101.63%
6	Perth Wildcats	28	15	13	53.57%	2–3	W1	9–5	6–8	2580	2568	100.47%
7	Melbourne United	28	15	13	53.57%	4–1	W1	8–6	7–7	2434	2424	100.41%
8	Adelaide 36ers	28	13	15	46.43%	2–3	L1	8–6	5–9	2546	2597	98.04%
9	Brisbane Bullets	28	8	20	28.57%	2–3	L3	4–10	4–10	2365	2600	90.96%
10	Illawarra Hawks	28	3	25	10.71%	1–4	L4	2–12	1–13	2261	2585	87.47%

Updated to match(es) played on 5 February 2023. Source: NBL.com.au

The NBL tie-breaker system as outlined in the NBL Rules and Regulations states that in the case of an identical win–loss record, the overall points percentage will determine order of seeding.

=== Ladder progression ===
Leader and qualification to semifinals
Qualification to semifinals
Qualification to play-in games
Last place

2022–23 NBL season
Team ╲ Round	1	2	3	4	5	6	7	8	9	10	11	12	13	14	15	16	17	18
Adelaide 36ers	—	—	7	4	8	8	7	6	6	7	7	7	7	5	8	8	8	8
Brisbane Bullets	9	9	10	9	9	9	9	9	8	9	9	9	9	9	9	9	9	9
Cairns Taipans	1	3	4	3	4	3	3	3	3	4	3	4	3	3	2	2	2	3
Illawarra Hawks	7	6	9	10	10	10	10	10	10	10	10	10	10	10	10	10	10	10
Melbourne United	5	5	6	8	6	6	8	8	9	8	8	8	8	8	6	7	7	7
New Zealand Breakers	6	4	3	2	1	2	2	1	2	2	1	2	2	2	3	3	3	2
Perth Wildcats	2	1	2	5	7	7	5	7	7	6	5	6	5	7	5	5	5	6
S.E. Melbourne Phoenix	4	7	8	7	3	4	4	4	4	3	4	3	4	6	7	6	6	5
Sydney Kings	3	2	1	1	2	1	1	2	1	1	2	1	1	1	1	1	1	1
Tasmania JackJumpers	8	8	5	6	5	5	6	5	5	5	6	5	6	4	4	4	4	4

Updated to match(es) played on 5 February 2023. Source: NBL.com.au

== Game log ==
=== Pre-season ===
2022 pre-season game log
Total: 2–0 (home: 2–0; road: 0–0)
September: 2–0 (Home: 2–0; Road: 0–0)

Game	Date	Team	Score	High points	High rebounds	High assists	Location Attendance	Record
1	9 September	Adelaide	W 98–87	Bryce Cotton (20)	Luke Travers (9)	Mitch Norton (6)	Eaton Recreration Centre; 300	1–0
2	11 September	Adelaide	W 97–91	Brady Manek (15)	Corey Webster (6)	Bryce Cotton (5)	HBF Arena; 500	2–0

=== NBL Blitz ===
2022 NBL Blitz game log
Total: 2–1 (home: 2–0; road: 0–1)
September: 2–1 (Home: 2–0; Road: 0–1)

Game	Date	Team	Score	High points	High rebounds	High assists	Location Attendance	Record
1	17 September	Cairns	W 98–80	Bryce Cotton (36)	Blanchfield, Travers (7)	Bryce Cotton (4)	Darwin Basketball Facility; 916	1–0
2	19 September	S.E. Melbourne	W 87–71	Corey Webster (16)	Brady Manek (9)	Bryce Cotton (5)	Darwin Basketball Facility; 838	2–0
3	21 September	@ Melbourne	L 90–63	Thomas, Webster (10)	Bryce Cotton (7)	Luke Travers (4)	Darwin Basketball Facility; 917	2–1

=== Regular season ===
2022–23 game log
Total: 15–13 (home: 9–5; road: 6–8)
October: 3–4 (Home: 2–2; Road: 1–2)

Game	Date	Team	Score	High points	High rebounds	High assists	Location Attendance	Record
1	2 October	Brisbane	W 87–73	Bryce Cotton (23)	Bryce Cotton (12)	Luke Travers (7)	RAC Arena; 11,083	1–0
2	8 October	Illawarra	W 77–71	Norton, Travers (14)	Manek, Travers (7)	Cotton, Travers (4)	RAC Arena; 10,816	2–0
3	10 October	@ Cairns	W 76–105	Bryce Cotton (24)	Luke Travers (9)	Mitch Norton (9)	Cairns Convention Centre; 3,608	3–0
4	14 October	Melbourne	L 81–84	Bryce Cotton (32)	Jesse Wagstaff (8)	Luke Travers (8)	RAC Arena; 10,441	3–1
5	22 October	@ Tasmania	L 103–72	Bryce Cotton (14)	Luke Travers (8)	Bryce Cotton (4)	MyState Bank Arena; 4,231	3–2
6	28 October	S.E. Melbourne	L 90–91	Bryce Cotton (27)	Blanchfield, Thomas (6)	Bryce Cotton (8)	RAC Arena; 11,103	3–3
7	31 October	@ Melbourne	L 94–77	Bryce Cotton (19)	TaShawn Thomas (7)	TaShawn Thomas (5)	John Cain Arena; 6,610	3–4

November: 2–2 (Home: 1–2; Road: 1–0)

Game	Date	Team	Score	High points	High rebounds	High assists	Location Attendance	Record
8	3 November	Tasmania	L 77–85	Bryce Cotton (26)	Cotton, Majok, Norton, Thomas (5)	Bryce Cotton (6)	RAC Arena; 9,805	3–5
9	5 November	@ Adelaide	W 89–94	Brady Manek (25)	TaShawn Thomas (9)	Bryce Cotton (5)	Adelaide Entertainment Centre; 9,071	4–5
10	17 November	S.E. Melbourne	W 103–96	Bryce Cotton (32)	Jesse Wagstaff (6)	TaShawn Thomas (6)	RAC Arena; 9,988	5–5
11	24 November	Adelaide	L 82–96	Bryce Cotton (17)	TaShawn Thomas (6)	Bryce Cotton (5)	RAC Arena; 10,329	5–6

December: 5–2 (Home: 1–0; Road: 4–2)

Game	Date	Team	Score	High points	High rebounds	High assists	Location Attendance	Record
12	1 December	@ Brisbane	L 106–94 (OT)	Bryce Cotton (30)	Luke Travers (8)	Luke Travers (4)	Nissan Arena; 2,427	5–7
13	3 December	@ New Zealand	W 84–92	Corey Webster (26)	Cotton, Manek, Thomas (6)	Bryce Cotton (7)	Spark Arena; 4,884	6–7
14	9 December	@ Adelaide	W 90–98	Bryce Cotton (32)	TaShawn Thomas (8)	Bryce Cotton (6)	Adelaide Entertainment Centre; 5,436	7–7
15	12 December	Melbourne	W 90–89	Bryce Cotton (29)	TaShawn Thomas (7)	Luke Travers (5)	RAC Arena; 10,459	8–7
–	16 December	New Zealand	Postponed (COVID-19) (Makeup date: 10 January)					
16	20 December	@ Cairns	W 83–105	Bryce Cotton (24)	TaShawn Thomas (12)	TaShawn Thomas (6)	Cairns Convention Centre; 3,752	9–7
17	27 December	@ Brisbane	L 97–93 (OT)	Bryce Cotton (30)	Luke Travers (10)	Bryce Cotton (6)	Nissan Arena; 3,737	9–8
18	31 December	@ Illawarra	W 97–107	Corey Webster (25)	Brady Manek (10)	Bryce Cotton (6)	WIN Entertainment Centre; 3,776	10–8

January: 4–4 (Home: 4–0; Road: 0–4)

Game	Date	Team	Score	High points	High rebounds	High assists	Location Attendance	Record
19	4 January	@ New Zealand	L 97–94	Bryce Cotton (32)	Brady Manek (7)	Bryce Cotton (5)	TSB Stadium; 2,200	10–9
20	7 January	@ Sydney	L 108–87	Cotton, C.Webster (22)	TaShawn Thomas (8)	Bryce Cotton (5)	Qudos Bank Arena; 11,073	10–10
21	10 January	New Zealand	W 93–90	TaShawn Thomas (23)	TaShawn Thomas (10)	Cotton, Manek, Thomas, C.Webster (3)	RAC Arena; 11,668	11–10
22	14 January	Adelaide	W 112–97	Cotton, Manek (23)	Brady Manek (10)	Tai Webster (7)	RAC Arena; 13,087	12–10
23	20 January	Sydney	W 111–104	Cotton, Manek (21)	Corey Webster (10)	Bryce Cotton (11)	RAC Arena; 13,038	13–10
24	22 January	@ S.E. Melbourne	L 112–91	Bryce Cotton (25)	Cotton, Travers (5)	Luke Travers (5)	State Basketball Centre; 3,300	13–11
25	27 January	Illawarra	W 106–86	Bryce Cotton (40)	Cotton, Manek, Travers, C.Webster (7)	Cotton, Wagstaff (4)	RAC Arena; 12,251	14–11
26	29 January	@ Tasmania	L 102–94	TaShawn Thomas (19)	TaShawn Thomas (10)	Thomas, Travers, C.Webster (4)	MyState Bank Arena; 4,293	14–12

February: 1–1 (Home: 1–1; Road: 0–0)

Game	Date	Team	Score	High points	High rebounds	High assists	Location Attendance	Record
27	3 February	Cairns	L 71–84	Bryce Cotton (28)	Bryce Cotton (13)	Bryce Cotton (7)	RAC Arena; 11,668	14–13
28	5 February	Sydney	W 96–84	Corey Webster (26)	Luke Travers (11)	Luke Travers (6)	RAC Arena; 12,712	15–13

2022–23 season schedule

=== Postseason ===
2023 finals game log
Total: 1–1 (home: 0–0; road: 1–1)
Play-in qualifier: 1–0 (Home: 0–0; Road: 1–0)

Game	Date	Team	Score	High points	High rebounds	High assists	Location Attendance	Record
1	9 February	@ S.E. Melbourne	W 99–106	Bryce Cotton (26)	Luke Travers (9)	TaShawn Thomas (8)	John Cain Arena; 5,176	1–0

Play-in game: 0–1 (Home: 0–0; Road: 0–1)

Game	Date	Team	Score	High points	High rebounds	High assists	Location Attendance	Record
2	12 February	@ Cairns	L 91–78	Bryce Cotton (19)	Brady Manek (10)	Bryce Cotton (10)	Cairns Convention Centre; 3,020	1–1

2022–23 season schedule

== Transactions ==
=== Re-signed ===
Player	Signed
Bryce Cotton	4 May
Ollie Hayes-Brown	17 May
Majok Majok	17 May
Kyle Zunic	24 May
Todd Blanchfield	27 May
Jesse Wagstaff	11 June

=== Additions ===
Player	Signed	Former team
Corey Webster	15 June	Franklin Bulls
TaShawn Thomas	26 July	Le Mans
Brady Manek	1 August	North Carolina Tar Heels
Michael Harris	12 August	Mount Gambier Pioneers
Jack Andrew	1 September	Otago Nuggets
Tai Webster	2 January	Petkim Spor

=== Subtractions ===
Player	Reason left	New team
Jack Purchase	Released	Forestville Eagles
Kevin White	Free agent	Illawarra Hawks
Matt Hodgson	Free agent	TaiwanBeer HeroBears
Corey Shervill	Released	N/A

== Awards ==
=== Club awards ===
- Coaches’ Award: Kyle Zunic
- Most Improved Player: Michael Harris
- Best Defensive Player: Luke Travers
- Players’ Player: Bryce Cotton
- Members MVP: Bryce Cotton
- Club MVP: Bryce Cotton

== See also ==
- 2022–23 NBL season
- Perth Wildcats
