= 2022–23 Tasmania JackJumpers season =

- Head coach: (United States) Scott Roth
- Captain: (Australia) Clint Steindl
- Arena: Derwent Entertainment Centre

NBL results
- Record: 16–12 (57.1%)
- Ladder: 4th
- Finals finish: Semifinalist (lost to Breakers 1–2)
- Stats at NBL.com.au

Player records
- Points: (United States) Doyle 17.1
- Rebounds: (United States) Kelly 6.2
- Assists: (United States) Magette 4.4
- All statistics correct as of 19 February 2023.

The 2022–23 Tasmania JackJumpers season was the 2nd season for the franchise in the National Basketball League (NBL).

== Roster ==
Note: Flags indicate national team eligibility at FIBA-sanctioned events. Players may hold other non-FIBA nationalities not displayed.

2022–23 Tasmania JackJumpers roster
Players
Coaches

Pos.	No.	Nat.	Name	Ht.	Wt.
G	1	(Australia)	Kenyon, Matt	1.96 m (6 ft 5 in)	91 kg (201 lb)
G	2	(United States)	Magette, Josh (injured) (I)	1.85 m (6 ft 1 in)	78 kg (172 lb)
G	4	(Australia)	White, Isaac (DP)	1.88 m (6 ft 2 in)	85 kg (187 lb)
F	6	(United States)	Kelly, Rashard (I)	2.01 m (6 ft 7 in)	103 kg (227 lb)
G	7	(New Zealand)	Brown, Walter (DP)	1.90 m (6 ft 3 in)	85 kg (187 lb)
G	9	(Australia)	McVeigh, Jack	2.03 m (6 ft 8 in)	95 kg (209 lb)
G	13	(Australia)	Macdonald, Sean (DP)	1.88 m (6 ft 2 in)	87 kg (192 lb)
F	20	(Australia)	Krslovic, Fabijan	2.03 m (6 ft 8 in)	108 kg (238 lb)
F	21	(Australia)	Bairstow, Jarred	2.01 m (6 ft 7 in)	104 kg (229 lb)
C	22	(Australia)	Magnay, Will	2.08 m (6 ft 10 in)	106 kg (234 lb)
F	23	(Malta)	Tomasi, Josh (DP)	2.08 m (6 ft 10 in)	104 kg (229 lb)
G	25	(United States)	Doyle, Milton (I)	1.93 m (6 ft 4 in)	82 kg (181 lb)
G	30	(Australia)	McDaniel, Sam	1.98 m (6 ft 6 in)	95 kg (209 lb)
G/F	35	(Australia)	Steindl, Clint (C)	2.00 m (6 ft 7 in)	91 kg (201 lb)
G	97	(Australia)	Weeks, Jarrad	1.83 m (6 ft 0 in)	80 kg (176 lb)

Head coach

- (United States) Scott Roth

Assistant coach(es)

- (Australia) Jacob Chance
- (Australia) Mark Radford
- (Australia) Jack Fleming

Team manager

- (Australia) Mark Chivers

Legend

- (C) Team captain
- (DP) Development player
- (IN) Inactive
- (I) Import player
- (SRP) Special restricted player
- (NS) Next Star player
- Injured

- Roster
Updated: 4 February 2023

== Standings ==
=== Ladder ===
Pos	2022–23 NBL season											
Pos	Team	Pld	W	L	PCT	Last 5	Streak	Home	Away	PF	PA	PP
1	Sydney Kings	28	19	9	67.86%	2–3	L2	10–4	9–5	2679	2468	108.55%
2	New Zealand Breakers	28	18	10	64.29%	5–0	W5	7–7	11–3	2423	2246	107.88%
3	Cairns Taipans	28	18	10	64.29%	2–3	W1	8–6	10–4	2455	2376	103.32%
4	Tasmania JackJumpers	28	16	12	57.14%	3–2	W2	7–7	9–5	2385	2305	103.47%
5	S.E. Melbourne Phoenix	28	15	13	53.57%	3–2	L1	11–3	4–10	2553	2512	101.63%
6	Perth Wildcats	28	15	13	53.57%	2–3	W1	9–5	6–8	2580	2568	100.47%
7	Melbourne United	28	15	13	53.57%	4–1	W1	8–6	7–7	2434	2424	100.41%
8	Adelaide 36ers	28	13	15	46.43%	2–3	L1	8–6	5–9	2546	2597	98.04%
9	Brisbane Bullets	28	8	20	28.57%	2–3	L3	4–10	4–10	2365	2600	90.96%
10	Illawarra Hawks	28	3	25	10.71%	1–4	L4	2–12	1–13	2261	2585	87.47%

Updated to match(es) played on 5 February 2023. Source: NBL.com.au

The NBL tie-breaker system as outlined in the NBL Rules and Regulations states that in the case of an identical win–loss record, the overall points percentage will determine order of seeding.

=== Ladder progression ===
Leader and qualification to semifinals
Qualification to semifinals
Qualification to play-in games
Last place

2022–23 NBL season
Team ╲ Round	1	2	3	4	5	6	7	8	9	10	11	12	13	14	15	16	17	18
Adelaide 36ers	—	—	7	4	8	8	7	6	6	7	7	7	7	5	8	8	8	8
Brisbane Bullets	9	9	10	9	9	9	9	9	8	9	9	9	9	9	9	9	9	9
Cairns Taipans	1	3	4	3	4	3	3	3	3	4	3	4	3	3	2	2	2	3
Illawarra Hawks	7	6	9	10	10	10	10	10	10	10	10	10	10	10	10	10	10	10
Melbourne United	5	5	6	8	6	6	8	8	9	8	8	8	8	8	6	7	7	7
New Zealand Breakers	6	4	3	2	1	2	2	1	2	2	1	2	2	2	3	3	3	2
Perth Wildcats	2	1	2	5	7	7	5	7	7	6	5	6	5	7	5	5	5	6
S.E. Melbourne Phoenix	4	7	8	7	3	4	4	4	4	3	4	3	4	6	7	6	6	5
Sydney Kings	3	2	1	1	2	1	1	2	1	1	2	1	1	1	1	1	1	1
Tasmania JackJumpers	8	8	5	6	5	5	6	5	5	5	6	5	6	4	4	4	4	4

Updated to match(es) played on 5 February 2023. Source: NBL.com.au

== Game log ==
=== Pre-season ===
2022 pre-season game log
Total: 2–0 (home: 2–0; road: 0–0)
September: 2–0 (Home: 2–0; Road: 0–0)

Game	Date	Team	Score	High points	High rebounds	High assists	Location Attendance	Record
1	6 September	S.E. Melbourne	W 88–83	Rashard Kelly (20)	Matt Kenyon (6)	Josh Magette (6)	Ulverstone Sports & Leisure Centre; 1,100	1–0
2	8 September	S.E. Melbourne	W 84–80	Milton Doyle (17)	Kelly, Kenyon (5)	Josh Magette (6)	Elphin Sports Centre; 1,100	2–0

=== NBL Blitz ===
2022 NBL Blitz game log
Total: 2–1 (home: 2–0; road: 0–1)
September: 2–1 (Home: 2–0; Road: 0–1)

Game	Date	Team	Score	High points	High rebounds	High assists	Location Attendance	Record
1	17 September	Sydney	W 73–53	Jack McVeigh (16)	Matt Kenyon (5)	Josh Magette (5)	Darwin Basketball Facility; 916	1–0
2	19 September	@ Adelaide	L 87–79	Jack McVeigh (16)	Kelly, Kenyon, Macdonald (5)	Josh Magette (7)	Darwin Basketball Facility; 838	1–1
3	22 September	Cairns	W 100–81	Jack McVeigh (25)	Isaac White (8)	Doyle, Magette (4)	Darwin Basketball Facility; 912	2–1

=== Regular season ===
2022–23 game log
Total: 16–12 (home: 7–7; road: 9–5)
October: 4–4 (Home: 2–1; Road: 2–3)

Game	Date	Team	Score	High points	High rebounds	High assists	Location Attendance	Record
1	1 October	@ S.E. Melbourne	L 84–79	Jack McVeigh (20)	Rashard Kelly (6)	Josh Magette (8)	John Cain Arena; 5,728	0–1
2	3 October	Cairns	L 84–106	Rashard Kelly (15)	Fabijan Krslovic (5)	Josh Magette (5)	MyState Bank Arena; 4,231	0–2
3	7 October	@ New Zealand	L 71–65	Jack McVeigh (19)	Rashard Kelly (10)	Doyle, Magette (5)	Spark Arena; 5,340	0–3
4	9 October	Brisbane	W 90–86 (OT)	Milton Doyle (32)	Kelly, McVeigh (9)	Milton Doyle (4)	MyState Bank Arena; 4,231	1–3
5	13 October	@ Adelaide	W 72–97	Josh Magette (23)	Bairstow, Kelly (6)	Josh Magette (7)	Adelaide Entertainment Centre; 8,027	2–3
6	16 October	@ Melbourne	W 64–74	Kelly, Krslovic (13)	Rashard Kelly (12)	Doyle, Magette, White (3)	John Cain Arena; 7,292	3–3
7	22 October	Perth	W 103–72	Jack McVeigh (17)	Milton Doyle (10)	Josh Magette (10)	MyState Bank Arena; 4,231	4–3
8	30 October	@ New Zealand	L 94–62	Milton Doyle (22)	Rashard Kelly (7)	Jarrad Weeks (3)	Spark Arena; 3,811	4–4

November: 2–2 (Home: 0–2; Road: 2–0)

Game	Date	Team	Score	High points	High rebounds	High assists	Location Attendance	Record
9	3 November	@ Perth	W 77–85	Jack McVeigh (22)	Milton Doyle (10)	Milton Doyle (5)	RAC Arena; 9,805	5–4
10	5 November	Brisbane	L 72–74	Jack McVeigh (17)	Rashard Kelly (11)	Josh Magette (3)	MyState Bank Arena; 4,231	5–5
11	18 November	New Zealand	L 76–84	Rashard Kelly (17)	Rashard Kelly (8)	Sean Macdonald (2)	Silverdome; 3,122	5–6
12	26 November	@ Melbourne	W 90–94	Milton Doyle (23)	Jack McVeigh (7)	Kelly, McVeigh (3)	John Cain Arena; 6,263	6–6

December: 4–3 (Home: 2–1; Road: 2–2)

Game	Date	Team	Score	High points	High rebounds	High assists	Location Attendance	Record
13	4 December	@ Brisbane	W 84–99	Milton Doyle (33)	Milton Doyle (9)	Sean Macdonald (4)	Nissan Arena; 3,811	7–6
14	11 December	@ Sydney	W 76–84	Milton Doyle (25)	Jack McVeigh (9)	Josh Magette (6)	Qudos Bank Arena; 7,321	8–6
15	17 December	Cairns	L 82–91	Jack McVeigh (17)	Milton Doyle (7)	Josh Magette (4)	MyState Bank Arena; 4,231	8–7
16	19 December	@ Adelaide	L 93–82	Milton Doyle (18)	Milton Doyle (6)	Josh Magette (6)	Adelaide Entertainment Centre; 7,010	8–8
17	22 December	Illawarra	W 87–60	Jack McVeigh (15)	Milton Doyle (8)	Doyle, Macdonald, Magette (4)	MyState Bank Arena; 4,269	9–8
18	26 December	New Zealand	W 93–82	Josh Magette (16)	Will Magnay (9)	Doyle, Magette (4)	MyState Bank Arena; 4,269	10–8
19	30 December	@ Sydney	L 97–77	Clint Steindl (13)	Fabijan Krslovic (3)	Josh Magette (3)	Qudos Bank Arena; 12,467	10–9

January: 5–3 (Home: 3–3; Road: 2–0)

Game	Date	Team	Score	High points	High rebounds	High assists	Location Attendance	Record
20	1 January	S.E. Melbourne	W 99–74	Milton Doyle (25)	Rashard Kelly (8)	Milton Doyle (7)	MyState Bank Arena; 4,269	11–9
21	7 January	Melbourne	L 85–92	Milton Doyle (20)	Rashard Kelly (6)	Josh Magette (5)	MyState Bank Arena; 4,269	11–10
22	10 January	@ Illawarra	W 89–92	Rashard Kelly (18)	Josh Magette (8)	Doyle, Magette (6)	WIN Entertainment Centre; 2,846	12–10
23	12 January	Adelaide	W 98–82	Doyle, McVeigh (28)	Doyle, McVeigh (6)	Josh Magette (5)	MyState Bank Arena; 4,293	13–10
24	18 January	S.E. Melbourne	L 75–86	Milton Doyle (16)	Will Magnay (7)	Milton Doyle (6)	Silverdome; 3,286	13–11
25	20 January	@ Cairns	W 77–85	Jack McVeigh (18)	Doyle, Magette (6)	Milton Doyle (8)	Cairns Convention Centre; 4,705	14–11
26	27 January	Sydney	L 77–91	Isaac White (11)	Rashard Kelly (6)	Milton Doyle (3)	MyState Bank Arena; 4,293	14–12
27	29 January	Perth	W 102–94	Milton Doyle (21)	Kelly, McVeigh (5)	Josh Magette (11)	MyState Bank Arena; 4,293	15–12

February: 1–0 (Home: 0–0; Road: 1–0)

Game	Date	Team	Score	High points	High rebounds	High assists	Location Attendance	Record
28	4 February	@ Illawarra	W 63–87	Milton Doyle (20)	Fabijan Krslovic (9)	Milton Doyle (10)	WIN Entertainment Centre; 3,511	16–12

2022–23 season schedule

=== Postseason ===
2023 finals game log
Total: 2–2 (home: 1–0; road: 1–2)
Seeding qualifier: 1–0 (Home: 0–0; Road: 1–0)

Game	Date	Team	Score	High points	High rebounds	High assists	Location Attendance	Record
1	9 February	@ Cairns	W 79–87	Milton Doyle (25)	Rashard Kelly (12)	Doyle, Kelly (4)	Cairns Convention Centre; 3,670	1–0

Semifinals: 1–2 (Home: 1–0; Road: 0–2)

Game	Date	Team	Score	High points	High rebounds	High assists	Location Attendance	Record
2	12 February	@ New Zealand	L 88–68	Rashard Kelly (12)	Matt Kenyon (6)	Milton Doyle (4)	Spark Arena; 5,479	1–1
3	16 February	New Zealand	W 89–78	Milton Doyle (23)	Kenyon, Magnay (6)	Milton Doyle (5)	MyState Bank Arena; 4,293	2–1
4	19 February	@ New Zealand	L 92–77	Jack McVeigh (22)	Jack McVeigh (7)	Doyle, Krslovic (3)	Spark Arena; 6,410	2–2

2022–23 season schedule

== Transactions ==
=== Re-signed ===
Player	Signed
Matt Kenyon	7 April
Will Magnay	21 April
Sean Macdonald	3 June
Josh Magette	8 June

=== Additions ===
Player	Signed	Former team
Rashard Kelly	21 June	JDA Dijon Basket
Milton Doyle	24 June	Gaziantep Basketbol
Isaac White	3 August	Illawarra Hawks
Tristan Forsyth	18 August	S.E. Melbourne Phoenix
Josh Tomasi	18 August	St. Cloud State Huskies
Walter Brown	26 August	Canterbury Rams

=== Subtractions ===
Player	Reason left	New team
MiKyle McIntosh	Free agent	Saga Ballooners
Sejr Deans	Collage	Jacksonville Dolphins
Jock Perry	Free agent	Casey Cavaliers
Josh Adams	Free agent	Cedevita Olimpija
Tristan Forsyth	Released	N/A

== Awards ==
=== Club awards ===
- Coaches Award: Sean Macdonald
- Spirit of the JackJumpers: Ryan Carroll (Sports Physiotherapist)
- Players Award: Isaac White
- Defensive Player: Will Magnay
- Fan Favourite: Jack McVeigh
- Club MVP: Milton Doyle

== See also ==
- 2022–23 NBL season
- Tasmania JackJumpers
