= 2022–23 Sydney Kings season =

Australian basketball club season

- NBL champions
- Regular season champions
- Head coach: (United States) Chase Buford
- Captain: (Australia) Xavier Cooks
- Arena: Sydney SuperDome

NBL results
- Record: 19–9 (67.9%)
- Ladder: 1st
- Finals finish: Champions (5th title) (Defeated Breakers 3–2)
- Stats at NBL.com.au

Player records
- Points: (United States) Walton 16.4
- Rebounds: (Australia) Cooks 7.8
- Assists: (United States) Walton 6.3
- All statistics correct as of 15 March 2023.

The 2022–23 Sydney Kings season was the 34th season of the franchise in the National Basketball League (NBL).

== Roster ==
Note: Flags indicate national team eligibility at FIBA-sanctioned events. Players may hold other non-FIBA nationalities not displayed.

2022–23 Sydney Kings roster
Players
Coaches

Pos.	No.	Nat.	Name	Ht.	Wt.
G	0	(United States)	Simon, Justin (I)	1.96 m (6 ft 5 in)	98 kg (216 lb)
C	1	(Australia)	Hunter, Jordan	2.09 m (6 ft 10 in)	110 kg (243 lb)
G	3	(Australia)	Vasiljevic, Dejan	1.90 m (6 ft 3 in)	88 kg (194 lb)
G	5	(Australia)	Glover, Angus	1.94 m (6 ft 4 in)	87 kg (192 lb)
F	6	(Australia)	Galloway, Jaylin	1.97 m (6 ft 6 in)	92 kg (203 lb)
G	7	(Australia)	Bruce, Shaun	1.92 m (6 ft 4 in)	88 kg (194 lb)
G	9	(South Sudan)	Makoi, Jackson (DP)	1.96 m (6 ft 5 in)	79 kg (174 lb)
F	10	(Australia)	Cooks, Xavier (C)	2.03 m (6 ft 8 in)	83 kg (183 lb)
G	11	(United States)	Walton, Derrick (I)	1.83 m (6 ft 0 in)	84 kg (185 lb)
C	12	(Brazil)	Soares, Tim (I)	2.11 m (6 ft 11 in)	107 kg (236 lb)
G	14	(Australia)	Bayles, Biwali (IN)	1.85 m (6 ft 1 in)	84 kg (185 lb)
F	15	(Australia)	Woodhill, Archie (DP)	2.06 m (6 ft 9 in)	102 kg (225 lb)
G	20	(Australia)	Mitchell, Iggy (injured) (DP)	1.93 m (6 ft 4 in)	91 kg (201 lb)
F	21	(South Sudan)	Noi, Kouat	2.01 m (6 ft 7 in)	93 kg (205 lb)
F	25	(Australia)	Gattorna, Isaac (DP)	1.99 m (6 ft 6 in)	102 kg (225 lb)

Head coach

- (United States) Chase Buford

Assistant coach(es)

- (United States) Kevin Lisch
- (Australia) Fleur McIntyre
- (Australia) Daniel Kickert

Legend

- (C) Team captain
- (DP) Development player
- (IN) Inactive
- (I) Import player
- (SRP) Special restricted player
- (NS) Next Star player
- Injured

- Roster
Updated: 19 February 2023

== Standings ==
=== Ladder ===
Pos	2022–23 NBL season											
Pos	Team	Pld	W	L	PCT	Last 5	Streak	Home	Away	PF	PA	PP
1	Sydney Kings	28	19	9	67.86%	2–3	L2	10–4	9–5	2679	2468	108.55%
2	New Zealand Breakers	28	18	10	64.29%	5–0	W5	7–7	11–3	2423	2246	107.88%
3	Cairns Taipans	28	18	10	64.29%	2–3	W1	8–6	10–4	2455	2376	103.32%
4	Tasmania JackJumpers	28	16	12	57.14%	3–2	W2	7–7	9–5	2385	2305	103.47%
5	S.E. Melbourne Phoenix	28	15	13	53.57%	3–2	L1	11–3	4–10	2553	2512	101.63%
6	Perth Wildcats	28	15	13	53.57%	2–3	W1	9–5	6–8	2580	2568	100.47%
7	Melbourne United	28	15	13	53.57%	4–1	W1	8–6	7–7	2434	2424	100.41%
8	Adelaide 36ers	28	13	15	46.43%	2–3	L1	8–6	5–9	2546	2597	98.04%
9	Brisbane Bullets	28	8	20	28.57%	2–3	L3	4–10	4–10	2365	2600	90.96%
10	Illawarra Hawks	28	3	25	10.71%	1–4	L4	2–12	1–13	2261	2585	87.47%

Updated to match(es) played on 5 February 2023. Source: NBL.com.au

The NBL tie-breaker system as outlined in the NBL Rules and Regulations states that in the case of an identical win–loss record, the overall points percentage will determine order of seeding.

=== Ladder progression ===
Leader and qualification to semifinals
Qualification to semifinals
Qualification to play-in games
Last place

2022–23 NBL season
Team ╲ Round	1	2	3	4	5	6	7	8	9	10	11	12	13	14	15	16	17	18
Adelaide 36ers	—	—	7	4	8	8	7	6	6	7	7	7	7	5	8	8	8	8
Brisbane Bullets	9	9	10	9	9	9	9	9	8	9	9	9	9	9	9	9	9	9
Cairns Taipans	1	3	4	3	4	3	3	3	3	4	3	4	3	3	2	2	2	3
Illawarra Hawks	7	6	9	10	10	10	10	10	10	10	10	10	10	10	10	10	10	10
Melbourne United	5	5	6	8	6	6	8	8	9	8	8	8	8	8	6	7	7	7
New Zealand Breakers	6	4	3	2	1	2	2	1	2	2	1	2	2	2	3	3	3	2
Perth Wildcats	2	1	2	5	7	7	5	7	7	6	5	6	5	7	5	5	5	6
S.E. Melbourne Phoenix	4	7	8	7	3	4	4	4	4	3	4	3	4	6	7	6	6	5
Sydney Kings	3	2	1	1	2	1	1	2	1	1	2	1	1	1	1	1	1	1
Tasmania JackJumpers	8	8	5	6	5	5	6	5	5	5	6	5	6	4	4	4	4	4

Updated to match(es) played on 5 February 2023. Source: NBL.com.au

== Game log ==
=== NBL Blitz ===
2022 NBL Blitz game log
Total: 2–1 (Home: 1–0; Road: 1–1)
September: 2–1 (Home: 1–0; Road: 1–1)

Game	Date	Team	Score	High points	High rebounds	High assists	Location Attendance	Record
1	17 September	@ Tasmania	L 73–53	Derrick Walton (12)	Kouat Noi (10)	Derrick Walton (4)	Darwin Basketball Facility; 916	0–1
2	21 September	S.E. Melbourne	W 91–79	Derrick Walton (15)	Xavier Cooks (5)	Biwali Bayles (4)	Darwin Basketball Facility; 917	1–1
3	23 September	@ New Zealand	W 93–101	Tim Soares (19)	Xavier Cooks (9)	Jackson Makoi (4)	Darwin Basketball Facility; 905	2–1

=== Regular season ===
2022–23 game log
Total: 19–9 (Home: 10–4; Road: 9–5)
October: 6–2 (Home: 2–2; Road: 4–0)

Game	Date	Team	Score	High points	High rebounds	High assists	Location Attendance	Record
1	1 October	@ Illawarra	W 97–106	Derrick Walton (32)	Justin Simon (9)	Derrick Walton (8)	WIN Entertainment Centre; 4,008	1–0
2	7 October	Brisbane	W 100–90	Xavier Cooks (23)	Xavier Cooks (11)	Derrick Walton (8)	Qudos Bank Arena; 11,478	2–0
3	9 October	@ Melbourne	W 71–91	Xavier Cooks (23)	Tim Soares (10)	Derrick Walton (6)	John Cain Arena; 7,881	3–0
4	14 October	Cairns	L 78–83	Dejan Vasiljevic (20)	Derrick Walton (9)	Derrick Walton (6)	Qudos Bank Arena; 7,287	3–1
5	16 October	@ Brisbane	W 85–102	Justin Simon (23)	Xavier Cooks (9)	Xavier Cooks (9)	Nissan Arena; 4,797	4–1
6	21 October	Adelaide	L 88–92	Derrick Walton (23)	Xavier Cooks (10)	Derrick Walton (6)	Qudos Bank Arena; 8,154	4–2
7	23 October	@ Melbourne	W 69–87	Cooks, Soares (14)	Xavier Cooks (10)	Derrick Walton (8)	John Cain Arena; 10,300	5–2
8	29 October	Cairns	W 106–103	Xavier Cooks (18)	Xavier Cooks (12)	Xavier Cooks (8)	Qudos Bank Arena; 7,282	6–2

November: 2–1 (Home: 1–0; Road: 1–1)

Game	Date	Team	Score	High points	High rebounds	High assists	Location Attendance	Record
9	6 November	@ New Zealand	W 77–81	Cooks, Simon (13)	Tim Soares (8)	Derrick Walton (5)	Spark Arena; 4,484	7–2
10	20 November	Illawarra	W 83–82	Angus Glover (13)	Justin Simon (8)	Derrick Walton (7)	Qudos Bank Arena; 11,032	8–2
11	28 November	@ Cairns	L 94–88 (OT)	Xavier Cooks (25)	Xavier Cooks (10)	Bruce, Walton (5)	Cairns Convention Centre; 3,636	8–3

December: 5–2 (Home: 3–1; Road: 2–1)

Game	Date	Team	Score	High points	High rebounds	High assists	Location Attendance	Record
12	4 December	Adelaide	W 97–78	Tim Soares (18)	Xavier Cooks (7)	Derrick Walton (11)	Qudos Bank Arena; 9,389	9–3
13	8 December	@ New Zealand	W 81–88	Derrick Walton (21)	Xavier Cooks (11)	Bruce, Cooks (5)	Spark Arena; 3,454	10–3
14	11 December	Tasmania	L 76–84	Derrick Walton (21)	Xavier Cooks (8)	Xavier Cooks (5)	Qudos Bank Arena; 7,321	10–4
15	16 December	@ Illawarra	W 79–86	Xavier Cooks (21)	Cooks, Soares (9)	Derrick Walton (9)	WIN Entertainment Centre; 3,288	11–4
16	18 December	@ S.E. Melbourne	L 113–112 (2OT)	Derrick Walton (45)	Justin Simon (9)	Derrick Walton (10)	Gippsland Regional Indoor Stadium; 3,000	11–5
17	25 December	Melbourne	W 101–80	Xavier Cooks (24)	Xavier Cooks (11)	Xavier Cooks (7)	Qudos Bank Arena; 7,012	12–5
18	30 December	Tasmania	W 97–77	Xavier Cooks (23)	Cooks, Vasiljevic (7)	Derrick Walton (7)	Qudos Bank Arena; 12,467	13–5

January: 6–2 (Home: 4–1; Road: 2–1)

Game	Date	Team	Score	High points	High rebounds	High assists	Location Attendance	Record
19	4 January	S.E. Melbourne	W 118–102	Dejan Vasiljevic (42)	Xavier Cooks (7)	Dejan Vasiljevic (5)	Qudos Bank Arena; 11,321	14–5
20	7 January	Perth	W 108–87	Xavier Cooks (24)	Xavier Cooks (11)	Bruce, Cooks, Vasiljevic (4)	Qudos Bank Arena; 11,073	15–5
21	11 January	@ Brisbane	W 67–116	Cooks, Soares (20)	Galloway, Soares (9)	Xavier Cooks (8)	Nissan Arena; 4,068	16–5
22	15 January	Illawarra	W 84–79	Derrick Walton (19)	Xavier Cooks (9)	Derrick Walton (7)	Qudos Bank Arena; 12,986	17–5
23	20 January	@ Perth	L 111–104	Dejan Vasiljevic (26)	Xavier Cooks (9)	Xavier Cooks (8)	RAC Arena; 13,038	17–6
24	22 January	New Zealand	L 88–93	Derrick Walton (17)	Derrick Walton (6)	Cooks, Walton (4)	Qudos Bank Arena; 14,232	17–7
25	27 January	@ Tasmania	W 77–91	Dejan Vasiljevic (24)	Angus Glover (7)	Bruce, Walton (4)	MyState Bank Arena; 4,293	18–7
26	29 January	S.E. Melbourne	W 111–106	Derrick Walton (22)	Xavier Cooks (10)	Xavier Cooks (10)	Qudos Bank Arena; 13,273	19–7

February: 0–2 (Home: 0–0; Road: 0–2)

Game	Date	Team	Score	High points	High rebounds	High assists	Location Attendance	Record
27	3 February	@ Adelaide	L 115–108	Tim Soares (24)	Simon, Soares (7)	Derrick Walton (13)	Adelaide Entertainment Centre; 9,558	19–8
28	5 February	@ Perth	L 96–84	Dejan Vasiljevic (18)	Glover, Vasiljevic (7)	Shaun Bruce (7)	RAC Arena; 12,712	19–9

2022–23 season schedule

=== Postseason ===
2023 finals game log
Total: 5–3 (Home: 4–1; Road: 1–2)
Semifinals: 2–1 (Home: 2–0; Road: 0–1)

Game	Date	Team	Score	High points	High rebounds	High assists	Location Attendance	Record
1	15 February	Cairns	W 95–87	Xavier Cooks (27)	Xavier Cooks (14)	Derrick Walton (5)	Qudos Bank Arena; 7,367	1–0
2	17 February	@ Cairns	L 93–82	Derrick Walton (22)	Justin Simon (10)	Derrick Walton (6)	Cairns Convention Centre; 4,626	1–1
3	19 February	Cairns	W 79–64	Dejan Vasiljevic (15)	Cooks, Noi (11)	Derrick Walton (9)	Qudos Bank Arena; 7,123	2–1

NBL Finals: 3–2 (Home: 2–1; Road: 1–1)

Game	Date	Team	Score	High points	High rebounds	High assists	Location Attendance	Record
4	3 March	New Zealand	L 87–95	Justin Simon (18)	Justin Simon (6)	Derrick Walton (6)	Qudos Bank Arena; 13,145	2–2
5	5 March	@ New Zealand	W 74–81	Kouat Noi (20)	Jordan Hunter (10)	Shaun Bruce (3)	Spark Arena; 8,429	3–2
6	10 March	New Zealand	W 91–68	Dejan Vasiljevic (15)	Xavier Cooks (8)	Derrick Walton (9)	Qudos Bank Arena; 18,049	4–2
7	12 March	@ New Zealand	L 80–70	Derrick Walton (18)	Justin Simon (7)	Derrick Walton (4)	Spark Arena; 9,742	4–3
8	15 March	New Zealand	W 77–69	Derrick Walton (21)	Xavier Cooks (11)	Derrick Walton (6)	Qudos Bank Arena; 18,124	5–3

2022–23 season schedule

== Transactions ==
=== Re-signed ===
Player	Signed
Angus Glover	17 May
Shaun Bruce	23 May
Dejan Vasiljevic	30 May
Xavier Cooks	7 June
Iggy Mitchell	23 August
Archie Woodhill	1 October

=== Additions ===
Player	Signed	Former team
Kouat Noi	6 June	Cairns Taipans
Jackson Makoi	21 June	Vrijednosnice Osijek
Derrick Walton	5 July	Motor City Cruise
Justin Simon	18 July	Riesen Ludwigsburg
Tim Soares	29 July	Ironi Ness Ziona
Isaac Gattorna	24 August	Adelaide 36ers

=== Subtractions ===
Player	Reason left	New team
Wani Swaka Lo Buluk	Free agent	Illawarra Hawks
Tom Vodanovich	Free agent	New Zealand Breakers
Jarell Martin	Free agent	Maccabi Tel Aviv
Makur Maker	Released	Washington Wizards
Jaylen Adams	Free agent	KK Crvena zvezda
Ian Clark	Free agent	Adelaide 36ers
Xavier Cooks	Contract buyout	Washington Wizards

== Awards ==
=== Club awards ===
- Club MVP: Xavier Cooks
- Members Player of the Year: Xavier Cooks
- Coaches Award: Tim Soares
- Player's Player: Xavier Cooks
- Defensive Player: Justin Simon
- Hard Work Award: Kouat Noi
- Club Person of the Year: Chris Ohlback

== See also ==
- 2022–23 NBL season
- Sydney Kings
