= Daniel Grida =

Australian basketball player

No. 11 – Illawarra Hawks
- Position: Forward
- League: NBL

Personal information
- Born: 26 April 1998 (age 28) Australia
- Listed height: 197 cm (6 ft 6 in)
- Listed weight: 93 kg (205 lb)

Career information
- Playing career: 2016–present

Career history
- 2016–2017: Lakeside Lightning
- 2017–2018: BA Centre of Excellence
- 2018–present: Illawarra Hawks
- 2019, 2024: Nelson Giants
- 2025–2026: Hawke's Bay Hawks

Career highlights
- NBL champion (2025)

Daniel Grida (born 26 April 1998) is an Australian professional basketball player for the Illawarra Hawks of the National Basketball League (NBL). He won an NBL championship with the Hawks in 2025.

== Early life ==
Grida is from Western Australia. He attended Atwell Primary School in Atwell. Grida played for the Lakeside Lightning of the State Basketball League as a junior. He played two seasons for the BA Centre of Excellence in the South East Australian Basketball League.

== Professional career ==
=== Illawarra Hawks (2018–present) ===
On 12 June 2018, Grida signed with the Illawarra Hawks of the National Basketball League (NBL). In March 2020, Grida ruptured his anterior cruciate ligament (ACL) and was ruled out for the rest of the season.

On 21 July 2020, Grida re-signed with the Hawks. He returned to playing in April 2021. In September 2021, Grida ruptured his ACL a second time during a preseason training session and was ruled out for the 2021–22 season.

On 17 March 2022, Grida re-signed with the Hawks on a two-year contract.

On 18 March 2023, Grida re-signed with the Hawks on a two-year contract. He won an NBL championship with the Hawks in 2025.

On 1 April 2025, Grida re-signed with the Hawks on a two-year contract.

=== NZNBL ===
Grida played for the Nelson Giants of the New Zealand National Basketball League (NZNBL) in 2019. He played for the Giants during the 2024 NZNBL season.

Grida joined the Hawke's Bay Hawks for the 2025 NZNBL season and averaged 23.4 points, 8.8 rebounds and 3.2 assists per game. He returned to the Hawke's Bay Hawks for the 2026 season.

== National team ==
Grida debuted for the Australia men's national basketball team during the 2019 FIBA Basketball World Cup Asian qualifiers. He went on to play for Australia during the 2022 FIBA Asia Cup qualifiers and 2023 FIBA Basketball World Cup Asian qualifiers.

In November 2026, Grida was named in the Boomers squad for two 2027 FIBA Basketball World Cup Asian qualifiers.

== Personal life ==
Grida also holds an Italian passport.
