= Wollongong Entertainment Centre =

Multi-purpose indoor arena in Wollongong, New South Wales, Australia

Wollongong Entertainment Centre WIN Entertainment Centre
- The WEC / The Sandpit
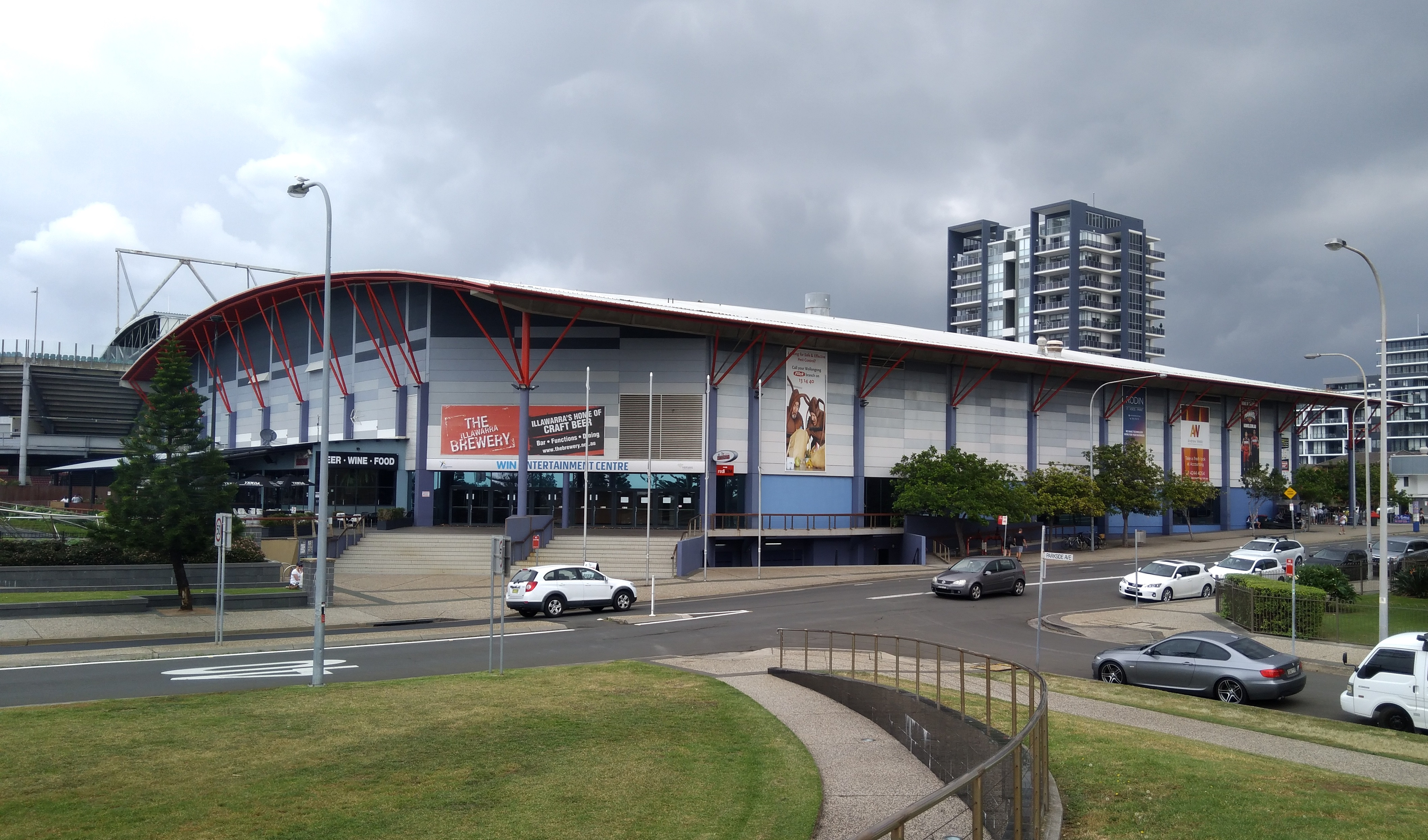
- WIN Entertainment Centre as seen from Lang Park (April 2018)
- Interactive map of Wollongong Entertainment Centre; WIN Entertainment Centre
- Former names: Wollongong Entertainment Centre
- Location: Corner of Crown & Harbour Streets, Wollongong, NSW 2520
- Coordinates: 34°25′36″S 150°54′10″E
- Owner: Venues NSW
- Capacity: Basketball: 6,000; Concerts: 6,000; Reduced mode: 1,000–3,000
- Surface: Customisable
- Record attendance: 5,839 – 18 February 2005, Wollongong Hawks vs Sydney Kings NBL

Construction
- Opened: 5 September 1998; 28 years ago
- Architect: NSW Government Architect

Tenant
- Illawarra Hawks (NBL) (1998–present)

Wollongong Entertainment Centre (also known by its naming rights sponsor WIN Entertainment Centre and colloquially as the WEC) is a multi-purpose indoor arena located in Wollongong, New South Wales, Australia.

The WEC opened on 5 September 1998 with a concert by Bob Dylan and Patti Smith; 4,935 people attended the event. Dylan performed at the venue again in 2011, performing to a crowd of 3,214 people, and again in 2018.

As well as hosting Bob Dylan’s concerts, the venue has played host to concerts by many nationally and internationally renowned performers, including Lady Gaga, Ed Sheeran, Guy Sebastian, Anastacia, John Farnham, Keith Urban, Tina Arena, Pink, Jimmy Barnes, Bryan Adams, John Mayer, Delta Goodrem, The Veronicas, The Script, X Ambassadors, Cher, Cyndi Lauper, Kelly Clarkson, Billy Ocean, Jack Johnson, Disney On Ice, and The Wiggles performing in early 2010s with some still performing at this venue present day.

The arena is a 3-minute walk from the city centre and has hosted a variety of events, including Federation Cup tennis, world championship boxing and international musical acts.

Every year the WIN Entertainment Centre holds the Wakakirri Story Dance Wollongong heat, Southern Stars and also a variety of concerts and expos.

The building was designed by the New South Wales Government Architect.

== Sporting events ==
The centre's logo

The venue is the home of the Illawarra Hawks who play in the National Basketball League (NBL). During Hawks games it is referred to as "The Sandpit" in reference to being next to the beach. The Hawks are the only original club left in the NBL.

The record attendance for an event at the WIN Centre is 5,839, set on 18 February 2005, when the Hawks played their regular season finale against the Sydney Kings.

In November 2025, it was named as the venue for all matches of the 2026 Wheelchair Rugby League World Cup.

== Naming rights ==
The naming rights to both facilities are owned by WIN Corporation, a Wollongong-based media company which owns the television network, WIN.

== Proposed redevelopment ==
On 23 January 2026, the Minns ministry announced a $17 million funding boost in order to allow planning for a brand new entertainment centre to commence. Unlike the simultaneously announced partial redevelopment of WIN stadium, a entirely new indoor arena will be built on the site of the current venue, to be named WIN Arena. The new precinct will nearly double the capacity of the current venue, going from 5,300 seats to 9,500 seats. The initial announced cash injection will cover the design, reporting and tendering stage of the project, however, the premier committed ongoing funding to the project. No timeline for the new arena's construction has yet been announced.

== See also ==
- List of indoor arenas in Australia
