= 2022–23 NBL season =

45th season of the Australasian basketball competition

- League: National Basketball League
- Season: 2022–23
- Duration: 1 October 2022 – 5 February 2023; 9–12 February 2023 (Play-in tournament); 12–19 February 2023 (Semifinals); 3–15 March 2023 (Finals)
- Games played: 140
- Teams: 10
- TV partners: Australia: ESPN; Network 10; 10 Peach; New Zealand: Sky Sport; Online: Kayo Sports; NBL TV; 10 Play

Regular season
- Season champions: Sydney Kings
- Season MVP: (Australia) Xavier Cooks (Sydney)

Finals
- Champions: Sydney Kings (5th title)
- Runners-up: New Zealand Breakers
- Semi-finalists: Cairns Taipans; Tasmania JackJumpers
- Finals MVP: (United States) Derrick Walton (Sydney)

Statistical leaders
Points	(United States) Bryce Cotton (Perth)	23.5
Rebounds	(United States) Alan Williams (S.E. Melbourne)	9.6
Assists	(Puerto Rico) Gary Browne (S.E. Melbourne)	6.5
Efficiency	(New Zealand) Tyrell Harrison (Brisbane)	80%

Records
- Biggest home win: 39 points S.E. Melbourne 111–72 Illawarra (8 December 2022)
- Biggest away win: 49 points Brisbane 67–116 Sydney (11 January 2023)
- Highest scoring: 225 points S.E. Melbourne 113–112 Sydney (18 December 2022)
- Lowest scoring: 136 points New Zealand 71–65 Tasmania (7 October 2022)
- Winning streak: 6 games Cairns Taipans (31 December 2022 – 15 January 2023); Sydney Kings (25 December 2022 – 15 January 2023)
- Losing streak: 11 games Illawarra Hawks (8 December 2022 – 15 January 2023)
- Highest attendance: 18,124 – Qudos Bank Arena; Sydney vs New Zealand (15 March 2023)
- Lowest attendance: 2,011 – WIN Entertainment Centre; Illawarra vs Brisbane (24 October 2022)
- Attendance: 970,704
- Average attendance: 6,303

NBL seasons
- ← 2021–22 2023–24 →
- All statistics correct as of 15 March 2023.

The 2022–23 NBL season was the 45th season of the National Basketball League since its establishment in 1979. A total of ten teams contested in the 2022–23 season.

Australian broadcast rights to the season are held by ESPN in the second season of a three-year deal. All games are available live on ESPN and the streaming platform Kayo Sports. Network 10 will broadcast two Sunday afternoon games on 10 Peach and 10 Play. In New Zealand, Sky Sport continue as the official league broadcaster.

The 2022–23 season saw a return to the traditional October start after two straight condensed seasons due to the COVID-19 pandemic.

The Sydney Kings won their second consecutive championship after beating the New Zealand Breakers in the Championship Series, 3–2.

== Teams ==
All ten teams from the 2021–22 NBL season continued on in 2022–23. The New Zealand Breakers returned to a regular home-and-away schedule after spending the majority of the previous two seasons based in Australia due to Covid-related travel restrictions.

=== Stadiums and locations ===
Team	Location	Stadium	Capacity
Adelaide 36ers	Adelaide	Adelaide Entertainment Centre	11,300
Brisbane Bullets	Brisbane	Nissan Arena	5,000
Cairns Taipans	Cairns	Cairns Convention Centre	5,300
Illawarra Hawks	Wollongong	WIN Entertainment Centre	6,000
Melbourne United	Melbourne	John Cain Arena	10,500
New Zealand Breakers	Auckland	Spark Arena	9,300
Perth Wildcats	Perth	RAC Arena	14,800
S.E. Melbourne Phoenix	Melbourne	John Cain Arena	10,500
S.E. Melbourne Phoenix	Melbourne	State Basketball Centre	3,200
Sydney Kings	Sydney	Qudos Bank Arena	18,200
Tasmania JackJumpers	Hobart	MyState Bank Arena	4,865
Tasmania JackJumpers	Launceston	Silverdome	3,255

=== Personnel and sponsorship ===
Team	Coach	Captain	Main sponsor	Kit manufacturer
Adelaide 36ers	(Australia) C. J. Bruton	(Australia) Mitch McCarron	Walker Corporation	Champion
Brisbane Bullets	(Australia) Greg Vanderjagt	(Australia) Aron Baynes	St. Genevieve	Champion
Cairns Taipans	(Australia) Adam Forde	(United States) Tahjere McCall	CQUniversity	Champion
Illawarra Hawks	(Australia) Jacob Jackomas	(Australia) Sam Froling (United States) Tyler Harvey	Multi Civil and Rail	Champion
Melbourne United	(Australia) Dean Vickerman	(Australia) Chris Goulding	DoorDash	Champion
New Zealand Breakers	(Israel) Mody Maor	(New Zealand) Thomas Abercrombie	Sky Sport	Champion
Perth Wildcats	(Australia) John Rillie	(Australia) Jesse Wagstaff	Pentanet	Champion
S.E. Melbourne Phoenix	(Australia) Simon Mitchell	(Australia) Kyle Adnam (Australia) Ryan Broekhoff (Australia) Mitch Creek	Mountain Goat Beer	Champion
Sydney Kings	(United States) Chase Buford	(Australia) Xavier Cooks	Hostplus	Champion
Tasmania JackJumpers	(United States) Scott Roth	(Australia) Clint Steindl	Spirit of Tasmania	Champion

=== Player transactions ===
Free agency began on 20 May 2022, due to the late finish of the 2021–22 season which had been delayed due to COVID-19 pandemic.

=== Head coaching transactions ===
Team	2021–22 season	2022–23 season	
Brisbane Bullets	James Duncan	Sam Mackinnon	Greg Vanderjagt
Illawarra Hawks	Brian Goorjian	Jacob Jackomas	
New Zealand Breakers	Dan Shamir	Mody Maor	
Perth Wildcats	Scott Morrison	John Rillie	
S.E. Melbourne Phoenix	Simon Mitchell		
Tasmania JackJumpers	Scott Roth		

== Pre-season ==
The pre-season games began on 9 August 2022, and ran until 6 October 2022.

The pre-season also featured the Adelaide 36ers playing two NBA teams in the United States, marking the fourth NBLxNBA tour.

=== Blitz ladder ===
The 2022 NBL Blitz ran from 16 to 23 September with all ten teams competing. Darwin, Northern Territory will host the tournament.

Pos	Team	Pld	W	L	PF	PA	PP	BP	Pts
1	Adelaide 36ers (C)	3	3	0	255	232	109.9	8	17
2	Melbourne United	3	2	1	238	211	112.8	8.5	14.5
3	Perth Wildcats	3	2	1	248	241	102.9	7	13
4	Tasmania JackJumpers	3	2	1	252	221	114.0	6.5	12.5
5	Illawarra Hawks	3	2	1	243	233	104.3	6.5	12.5
6	Brisbane Bullets	3	2	1	225	225	100.0	6	12
7	Sydney Kings	3	2	1	245	245	100.0	5.5	11.5
8	New Zealand Breakers	3	0	3	243	267	91.0	5	5
9	Cairns Taipans	3	0	3	237	275	86.2	4	4
10	S.E. Melbourne Phoenix	3	0	3	226	262	86.3	3	3

Updated to match(es) played on 23 September 2022. Source: nblblitz.com.au
(C) Champions

== Regular season ==
The regular season began on 1 October 2022. It consisted of 140 games spread across 18 rounds, with the final game being played on 5 February 2023.

On 16 November 2022, player Isaac Humphries came out as gay. The announcement meant Humphries was the first Australian male basketball player and the first player in the NBL to be openly gay, and the only active openly gay male professional basketball player in a top-tier league anywhere in the world at the time.

On 30 January 2023, Sydney Kings claimed their 7th regular season championship.

=== Round 1 ===
1 October 2022	S.E. Melbourne Phoenix	84–79	Tasmania JackJumpers	John Cain Arena, Melbourne
18:00	Scoring by quarter: 28–16, 15–17, 14–18, 27–28
ESPN	Pts: Adnam 30; Rebs: Anticevich, Williams 7 Asts: Adnam 4	boxscore report	Pts: McVeigh 20; Rebs: Kelly 6 Asts: Magette 8	Attendance: 5,728

1 October 2022	Illawarra Hawks	97–106	Sydney Kings	WIN Entertainment Centre, Wollongong
20:00	Scoring by quarter: 21–24, 22–20, 29–31, 25–31
ESPN	Pts: Dent 19; Rebs: Froling 10; Asts: Robinson 8	boxscore report	Pts: Walton 32; Rebs: Simon 9 Asts: Walton 8	Attendance: 4,008

2 October 2022	Melbourne United	101–97(OT)	New Zealand Breakers	John Cain Arena, Melbourne
14:00	Scoring by quarter: 20–22, 25–20, 24–25, 19–21, Overtime: 13–9
ESPN	Pts: Rathan-Mayes 33; Rebs: Humphries 6 Asts: Rathan-Mayes 9	boxscore report	Pts: Brown, Pardon 23; Rebs: McDowell-White 13; Asts: McDowell-White 7	Attendance: 7,236

2 October 2022	Perth Wildcats	87–73	Brisbane Bullets	RAC Arena, Perth
13:00	Scoring by quarter: 22–22, 26–13, 22–24, 17–14
ESPN	Pts: Cotton 23; Rebs: Cotton 12; Asts: Travers 7	boxscore report	Pts: Walker 16; Rebs: Baynes 7 Asts: Cadee 6	Attendance: 11,083

3 October 2022	Tasmania JackJumpers	84–106	Cairns Taipans	MyState Bank Arena, Hobart
19:30	Scoring by quarter: 23–15, 27–33, 17–39, 17–19
ESPN	Pts: Kelly 15; Rebs: Krslovic 5 Asts: Magette 5	boxscore report	Pts: Deng 26; Rebs: McCall 7 Asts: McCall 7	Attendance: 4,231

=== Round 2 ===
6 October 2022	Illawarra Hawks	85–72	S.E. Melbourne Phoenix	WIN Entertainment, Wollongong
19:30	Scoring by quarter: 22–19, 20–16, 23–13, 20–24
ESPN	Pts: Harvey 22; Rebs: Froling 9 Asts: Dent 5	boxscore report	Pts: Madut 21; Rebs: Williams 11; Asts: Adnam 6	Attendance: 2,806

7 October 2022	New Zealand Breakers	71–65	Tasmania JackJumpers	Spark Arena, Auckland
19:30	Scoring by quarter: 25–18, 21–21, 6–11, 19–15
Sky Sports	Pts: Brantley 19; Rebs: Loe, Pardon 7 Asts: McDowell-White 4	boxscore report	Pts: McVeigh 19; Rebs: Kelly 10; Asts: Doyle, Magette 5	Attendance: 5,340

7 October 2022	Sydney Kings	100–90	Brisbane Bullets	Qudos Bank Arena, Sydney
19:30	Scoring by quarter: 24–23, 22–16, 21–28, 33–23
ESPN	Pts: Cooks 23; Rebs: Cooks 11; Asts: Walton 8	boxscore report	Pts: Baynes, Cadee 16; Rebs: Baynes 9 Asts: Krebs 5	Attendance: 11,478

8 October 2022	S.E. Melbourne Phoenix	76–85	Cairns Taipans	John Cain Arena, Melbourne
17:30	Scoring by quarter: 22–18, 19–25, 21–16, 14–26
ESPN	Pts: Creek 27; Rebs: Pineau, Williams 8 Asts: Williams 5	boxscore report	Pts: Pinder 19; Rebs: Hogg, Pinder 8 Asts: Scott 7	Attendance: 4,953

8 October 2022	Perth Wildcats	77–71	Illawarra Hawks	RAC Arena, Perth
17:00	Scoring by quarter: 23–25, 18–24, 13–10, 23–12
ESPN	Pts: Norton, Travers 14; Rebs: Manek, Travers 7 Asts: Cotton, Travers 4	boxscore report	Pts: King 25; Rebs: Deng 12; Asts: Harvey 5	Attendance: 10,816

9 October 2022	Tasmania JackJumpers	90–86(OT)	Brisbane Bullets	MyState Bank Arena, Hobart
14:00	Scoring by quarter: 11–17, 20–28, 23–10, 23–22, Overtime: 13–9
10 Peach	Pts: Doyle 32; Rebs: Kelly, McVeigh 9 Asts: Doyle 4	boxscore report	Pts: Johnson 24; Rebs: Baynes 6 Asts: Mitchell 4	Attendance: 4,231

9 October 2022	Melbourne United	71–91	Sydney Kings	John Cain Arena, Melbourne
16:00	Scoring by quarter: 17–27, 6–30, 25–17, 23–17
10 Peach	Pts: Barker, Caroline 10; Rebs: Caroline 10; Asts: Tucker 3	boxscore report	Pts: Cooks 23; Rebs: Soares 10; Asts: Walton 6	Attendance: 7,881

10 October 2022	Cairns Taipans	76–105	Perth Wildcats	Cairns Convention Centre, Cairns
18:30	Scoring by quarter: 24–23, 13–37, 23–25, 16–20
ESPN	Pts: Pinder 18; Rebs: Pinder 15; Asts: Scott 8	boxscore report	Pts: Cotton 24; Rebs: Travers 9 Asts: Norton 9	Attendance: 3,608

=== Round 3 ===
13 October 2022	Adelaide 36ers	72–97	Tasmania JackJumpers	Adelaide Entertainment Centre, Adelaide
19:00	Scoring by quarter: 10–32, 27–19, 17–16, 18–30
ESPN	Pts: Randall 18; Rebs: McCarron 6 Asts: McCarron 5	boxscore report	Pts: Magette 23; Rebs: Bairstow, Kelly 6 Asts: Magette 7	Attendance: 8,027

14 October 2022	Sydney Kings	78–83	Cairns Taipans	Qudos Bank Arena, Sydney
19:30	Scoring by quarter: 25–19, 15–20, 19–22, 19–22
ESPN	Pts: Vasiljevic 20; Rebs: Walton 9 Asts: Walton 6	boxscore report	Pts: Pinder, Scott 16; Rebs: Pinder 11; Asts: Hogg, Scott 5	Attendance: 7,287

14 October 2022	Perth Wildcats	81–84	Melbourne United	RAC Arena, Perth
18:30	Scoring by quarter: 19–24, 21–18, 20–22, 21–20
ESPN	Pts: Cotton 32; Rebs: Wagstaff 8 Asts: Travers 8	boxscore report	Pts: Humphries, Rathan-Mayes 17; Rebs: Rathan-Mayes 11; Asts: Goulding, Rathan-Mayes 5	Attendance: 10,441

15 October 2022	Adelaide 36ers	90–80	Illawarra Hawks	Adelaide Entertainment Centre, Adelaide
17:00	Scoring by quarter: 25–17, 21–23, 12–20, 32–20
ESPN	Pts: Randall 28; Rebs: Franks 9 Asts: Johnson 8	boxscore report	Pts: Deng 18; Rebs: King 9 Asts: Deng, Dent, Harvey 3	Attendance: 8,143

15 October 2022	S.E. Melbourne Phoenix	77–85	New Zealand Breakers	John Cain Arena, Melbourne
20:00	Scoring by quarter: 17–19, 21–26, 18–18, 21–22
ESPN	Pts: Creek 20; Rebs: Broekhoff 8 Asts: Adnam 7	boxscore report	Pts: Loe 18; Rebs: McDowell-White 7 Asts: Le'afa 10	Attendance: 4,364

16 October 2022	Melbourne United	64–74	Tasmania JackJumpers	John Cain Arena, Melbourne
14:00	Scoring by quarter: 14–22, 15–20, 22–19, 13–13
10 Peach	Pts: Rathan-Mayes 18; Rebs: Barlow, Rathan-Mayes 7 Asts: Barlow 4	boxscore report	Pts: Kelly, Krslovic 13; Rebs: Kelly 12; Asts: Doyle, Magette, White 3	Attendance: 7,292

16 October 2022	Brisbane Bullets	85–102	Sydney Kings	Nissan Arena, Brisbane
15:00	Scoring by quarter: 21–16, 19–31, 16–24, 29–31
10 Peach	Pts: Mitchell 20; Rebs: Mitchell 10; Asts: Sobey 8	boxscore report	Pts: Simon 23; Rebs: Cooks 9 Asts: Cooks 9	Attendance: 4,797

17 October 2022	Illawarra Hawks	62–88	New Zealand Breakers	WIN Entertainment Centre, Wollongong
19:30	Scoring by quarter: 16–21, 10–26, 23–13, 13–28
ESPN	Pts: Harvey 12; Rebs: King 8 Asts: Dent 4	boxscore report	Pts: McDowell-White 17; Rebs: McDowell-White 10; Asts: McDowell-White 6	Attendance: 2,208

=== Round 4 ===
20 October 2022	New Zealand Breakers	77–99	S.E. Melbourne Phoenix	The Trusts Arena, Auckland
19:30	Scoring by quarter: 25–38, 16–20, 15–23, 21–18
Sky Sports	Pts: Brantley 17; Rebs: Loe 8 Asts: Izayah 4	boxscore report	Pts: Adnam 17; Rebs: Williams 9 Asts: Browne 9	Attendance: 2,288

20 October 2022	Melbourne United	77–81	Cairns Taipans	John Cain Arena, Melbourne
19:30	Scoring by quarter: 19–15, 24–22, 16–26, 18–18
ESPN	Pts: Rathan-Mayes 21; Rebs: Tucker 10; Asts: Goulding, Tucker 3	boxscore report	Pts: Pinder 26; Rebs: Pinder 10; Asts: Scott 9	Attendance: 4,449

21 October 2022	Sydney Kings	88–92	Adelaide 36ers	Qudos Bank Arena, Sydney
19:30	Scoring by quarter: 20–25, 22–25, 29–18, 17–24
ESPN	Pts: Walton 23; Rebs: Cooks 10; Asts: Walton 6	boxscore report	Pts: Randall 24; Rebs: Johnson 8 Asts: Randall 5	Attendance: 8,154

22 October 2022	S.E. Melbourne Phoenix	89–88	Brisbane Bullets	John Cain Arena, Melbourne
17:30	Scoring by quarter: 21–25, 20–22, 27–22, 21–19
ESPN	Pts: Creek 31; Rebs: Williams 8 Asts: Browne 11	boxscore report	Pts: Cadee 21; Rebs: Harrison 8 Asts: Cadee, Sobey 5	Attendance: 5,432

22 October 2022	Tasmania JackJumpers	103–72	Perth Wildcats	MyState Bank Arena, Hobart
20:00	Scoring by quarter: 22–23, 34–17, 23–12, 24–20
ESPN	Pts: McVeigh 17; Rebs: Doyle 10; Asts: Magette 10	boxscore report	Pts: Cotton 14; Rebs: Travers 8 Asts: Cotton 4	Attendance: 4,231

23 October 2022	Cairns Taipans	64–68	New Zealand Breakers	Cairns Convention Centre, Cairns
13:00	Scoring by quarter: 16–5, 16–18, 18–22, 14–23
10 Peach	Pts: Hogg 25; Rebs: Pinder 12; Asts: Scott 8	boxscore report	Pts: Brown 24; Rebs: Pardon, Vodanovich 8 Asts: McDowell-White 4	Attendance: 4,091

23 October 2022	Melbourne United	69–87	Sydney Kings	John Cain Arena, Melbourne
16:00	Scoring by quarter: 25–22, 14–18, 15–25, 15–22
10 Peach	Pts: Tucker 20; Rebs: Tucker 10; Asts: Rathan-Mayes 7	boxscore report	Pts: Cooks, Soares 14; Rebs: Cooks 10; Asts: Walton 8	Attendance: 10,300

24 October 2022	Illawarra Hawks	56–82	Brisbane Bullets	WIN Entertainment Centre, Wollongong
19:30	Scoring by quarter: 13–22, 16–22, 13–11, 14–27
ESPN	Pts: Harvey 13; Rebs: Dent, Froling, Mathiang 6 Asts: Dent 4	boxscore report	Pts: Baynes 17; Rebs: Baynes 14; Asts: Sobey 7	Attendance: 2,011

=== Round 5 ===
27 October 2022	Brisbane Bullets	86–61	Illawarra Hawks	Nissan Arena, Brisbane
18:30	Scoring by quarter: 29–17, 23–13, 21–16, 13–15
ESPN	Pts: Sobey 22; Rebs: Baynes 14; Asts: Sobey 5	boxscore report	Pts: Deng 11; Rebs: Froling 12; Asts: Siva 5	Attendance: 2,583

28 October 2022	Adelaide 36ers	70–99	New Zealand Breakers	Adelaide Entertainment Centre, Adelaide
19:00	Scoring by quarter: 22–24, 16–22, 12–28, 20–25
ESPN	Pts: Sotto 16; Rebs: Sotto 7 Asts: Dech, McCarron 3	boxscore report	Pts: Brantley, Brown 22; Rebs: Brantley 9 Asts: McDowell-White 7	Attendance: 6,717

28 October 2022	Perth Wildcats	90–91	S.E. Melbourne Phoenix	RAC Arena, Perth
18:30	Scoring by quarter: 18–27, 33–18, 23–24, 16–22
ESPN	Pts: Cotton 27; Rebs: Blanchfield, Thomas 6 Asts: Cotton 8	boxscore report	Pts: Creek 22; Rebs: Williams 7 Asts: Browne 8	Attendance: 11,103

29 October 2022	Illawarra Hawks	100–106(2OT)	Melbourne United	WIN Entertainment Centre, Wollongong
17:30	Scoring by quarter: 20–18, 16–17, 24–23, 25–27, Overtime: 10–10, 5–11
ESPN	Pts: Froling 27; Rebs: Froling 15; Asts: Siva 11	boxscore report	Pts: Rathan-Mayes 32; Rebs: Tucker 13; Asts: Goulding 5	Attendance: 3,139

29 October 2022	Sydney Kings	106–103	Cairns Taipans	Qudos Bank Arena, Sydney
20:00	Scoring by quarter: 30–35, 25–27, 29–20, 22–21
ESPN	Pts: Cooks 18; Rebs: Cooks 12; Asts: Cooks 8	boxscore report	Pts: Hogg 27; Rebs: Pinder 7 Asts: Scott 8	Attendance: 7,282

30 October 2022	New Zealand Breakers	94–62	Tasmania JackJumpers	Spark Arena, Auckland
16:00	Scoring by quarter: 17–15, 16–10, 31–25, 30–12
10 Peach	Pts: Brown 24; Rebs: Pardon 14; Asts: McDowell-White 7	boxscore report	Pts: Doyle 22; Rebs: Kelly 7 Asts: Weeks 3	Attendance: 3,811

30 October 2022	S.E. Melbourne Phoenix	103–98(OT)	Adelaide 36ers	John Cain Arena, Melbourne
16:00	Scoring by quarter: 35–25, 17–19, 16–27, 23–20, Overtime: 12–7
10 Peach	Pts: Kell 24; Rebs: Creek 9 Asts: Browne 7	boxscore report	Pts: Randall 28; Rebs: Franks, McCarron 9 Asts: Cleveland, Franks, Randall 3	Attendance: 7,195

31 October 2022	Melbourne United	94–77	Perth Wildcats	John Cain Arena, Melbourne
19:30	Scoring by quarter: 26–24, 24–16, 19–18, 25–19
ESPN	Pts: Rathan-Mayes 25; Rebs: Rathan-Mayes 10; Asts: Goulding 5	boxscore report	Pts: Cotton 19; Rebs: Thomas 7 Asts: Thomas 5	Attendance: 6,610

=== Round 6 ===
3 November 2022	Illawarra Hawks	80–96	Adelaide 36ers	WIN Entertainment Centre, Wollongong
19:30	Scoring by quarter: 18–26, 19–23, 21–16, 22–31
ESPN	Pts: Harvey 25; Rebs: Froling 11; Asts: Siva 10	boxscore report	Pts: Johnson 28; Rebs: Johnson 7 Asts: McCarron 7	Attendance: 2,118

3 November 2022	Perth Wildcats	77–85	Tasmania JackJumpers	RAC Arena, Perth
18:30	Scoring by quarter: 19–16, 19–20, 20–24, 19–25
ESPN	Pts: Cotton 26; Rebs: Cotton, Majok, Norton, Thomas 5 Asts: Cotton 6	boxscore report	Pts: McVeigh 22; Rebs: Doyle 10; Asts: Doyle 5	Attendance: 9,805

4 November 2022	Cairns Taipans	97–72	Melbourne United	Cairns Convention Centre, Cairns
18:30	Scoring by quarter: 15–15, 26–18, 30–10, 26–29
ESPN	Pts: Kuol, Pinder 18; Rebs: Pinder 11; Asts: Scott 6	boxscore report	Pts: Humphries 17; Rebs: Humphries 8 Asts: Goulding, Newley 4	Attendance: 3,704

5 November 2022	Tasmania JackJumpers	72–74	Brisbane Bullets	MyState Bank Arena, Hobart
17:30	Scoring by quarter: 14–19, 16–27, 23–18, 19–10
ESPN	Pts: McVeigh 17; Rebs: Kelly 11; Asts: Magette 3	boxscore report	Pts: Baynes 16; Rebs: Baynes, Mitchell 9 Asts: Sobey 7	Attendance: 4,231

5 November 2022	Adelaide 36ers	89–94	Perth Wildcats	Adelaide Entertainment Centre, Adelaide
19:30	Scoring by quarter: 15–24, 31–22, 17–16, 26–32
ESPN	Pts: Franks 24; Rebs: Franks 9 Asts: Johnson 5	boxscore report	Pts: Manek 25; Rebs: Thomas 9 Asts: Cotton 5	Attendance: 9,071

6 November 2022	New Zealand Breakers	77–81	Sydney Kings	Spark Arena, Auckland
16:00	Scoring by quarter: 12–26, 15–19, 19–19, 31–17
10 Peach	Pts: Brown 22; Rebs: McDowell-White 12; Asts: Le'afa 4	boxscore report	Pts: Cooks, Simon 13; Rebs: Soares 8 Asts: Walton 5	Attendance: 4,484

6 November 2022	Melbourne United	110–85	S.E. Melbourne Phoenix	John Cain Arena, Melbourne
16:00	Scoring by quarter: 29–31, 23–18, 31–18, 27–18
10 Peach	Pts: Goulding 30; Rebs: Rathan-Mayes 6 Asts: Rathan-Mayes 8	boxscore report	Pts: Williams 30; Rebs: Williams 14; Asts: Browne 8	Attendance: 10,300

=== Round 7 ===
17 November 2022	Melbourne United	86–91	Adelaide 36ers	John Cain Arena, Melbourne
19:30	Scoring by quarter: 20–25, 30–26, 14–23, 22–17
ESPN	Pts: Tucker 23; Rebs: Humphries 6 Asts: Humphries 4	boxscore report	Pts: Drmic, Franks 21; Rebs: Franks 11; Asts: McCarron 5	Attendance: 5,100

17 November 2022	Perth Wildcats	103–96	S.E. Melbourne Phoenix	RAC Arena, Perth
18:30	Scoring by quarter: 20–21, 28–14, 27–24, 28–37
ESPN	Pts: Cotton 32; Rebs: Wagstaff 6 Asts: Thomas 6	boxscore report	Pts: Creek 32; Rebs: Creek, Te Rangi, Williams 8 Asts: Browne 6	Attendance: 9,988

18 November 2022	Tasmania JackJumpers	76–84	New Zealand Breakers	Silverdome, Launceston
19:30	Scoring by quarter: 21–23, 20–14, 20–21, 15–26
ESPN	Pts: Kelly 17; Rebs: Kelly 8 Asts: Macdonald 2	boxscore report	Pts: Pardon 19; Rebs: Pardon 10; Asts: McDowell-White 6	Attendance: 3,122

19 November 2022	S.E. Melbourne Phoenix	84–69	Melbourne United	John Cain Arena, Melbourne
17:30	Scoring by quarter: 17–16, 22–16, 30–14, 15–23
ESPN	Pts: Creek 23; Rebs: Williams 15; Asts: Browne 11	boxscore report	Pts: Tucker 22; Rebs: Rathan-Mayes 8 Asts: Rathan-Mayes 7	Attendance: 10,175

19 November 2022	Brisbane Bullets	82–90	Cairns Taipans	Nissan Arena, Brisbane
19:00	Scoring by quarter: 16–20, 20–20, 21–25, 25–25
ESPN	Pts: Mitchell 21; Rebs: Baynes 11; Asts: Johnson 4	boxscore report	Pts: Pinder 25; Rebs: Pinder 8 Asts: Scott 10	Attendance: 4,401

20 November 2022	New Zealand Breakers	89–83	Adelaide 36ers	The Trusts Arena, Auckland
16:00	Scoring by quarter: 17–25, 28–18, 20–20, 24–20
10 Peach	Pts: Brown 22; Rebs: Brantley, Pardon 10; Asts: McDowell-White 7	boxscore report	Pts: Cleveland 17; Rebs: McCarron 9 Asts: Cleveland 6	Attendance: 2,909

20 November 2022	Sydney Kings	83–82	Illawarra Hawks	Qudos Bank Arena, Sydney
16:00	Scoring by quarter: 25–19, 17–20, 23–17, 18–26
10 Peach	Pts: Glover 13; Rebs: Simon 8 Asts: Walton 7	boxscore report	Pts: Harvey 32; Rebs: Deng 9 Asts: Dent, Froling, Hickey 3	Attendance: 11,032

=== Round 8 ===
24 November 2022	Perth Wildcats	82–96	Adelaide 36ers	RAC Arena, Perth
18:30	Scoring by quarter: 17–26, 24–28, 19–21, 22–21
ESPN	Pts: Cotton 17; Rebs: Thomas 6 Asts: Cotton 5	boxscore report	Pts: Franks 21; Rebs: Franks, Johnson 8 Asts: Drmic, McCarron 6	Attendance: 10,329

25 November 2022	Cairns Taipans	71–82	New Zealand Breakers	Cairns Convention Centre, Cairns
18:30	Scoring by quarter: 23–16, 9–19, 20–23, 19–24
ESPN	Pts: Waardenburg 15; Rebs: Pinder 10; Asts: Scott 7	boxscore report	Pts: Brantley, Brown 20; Rebs: Pardon 11; Asts: McDowell-White 8	Attendance: 3,661

26 November 2022	Melbourne United	90–94	Tasmania JackJumpers	John Cain Arena, Melbourne
20:00	Scoring by quarter: 31–23, 22–24, 22–24, 15–23
ESPN	Pts: Tucker 23; Rebs: Tucker 10; Asts: Rathan-Mayes 6	boxscore report	Pts: Doyle 23; Rebs: McVeigh 7 Asts: Kelly, Mcveigh 3	Attendance: 6,263

27 November 2022	New Zealand Breakers	116–79	Brisbane Bullets	Spark Arena, Auckland
16:00	Scoring by quarter: 30–21, 35–26, 19–13, 32–19
10 Peach	Pts: Brantley 29; Rebs: Brantley 8 Asts: Brantley, Gliddon, Le'afa 5	boxscore report	Pts: Krebs 19; Rebs: Gak 6 Asts: Sobey 10	Attendance: 3,660

27 November 2022	S.E. Melbourne Phoenix	112–78	Illawarra Hawks	John Cain Arena, Melbourne
16:00	Scoring by quarter: 27–17, 27–21, 30–20, 28–20
10 Peach	Pts: Creek 27; Rebs: Williams 12; Asts: Browne 8	boxscore report	Pts: Frazier, Harvey 17; Rebs: Froling 7 Asts: Harvey, Siva 3	Attendance: 5,099

28 November 2022	Cairns Taipans	94–88(OT)	Sydney Kings	Cairns Convention Centre, Cairns
18:30	Scoring by quarter: 23–24, 21–20, 11–21, 23–13, Overtime: 16–10
ESPN	Pts: Pinder 30; Rebs: Pinder 13; Asts: McCall 4	boxscore report	Pts: Cooks 25; Rebs: Cooks 10; Asts: Bruce, Walton 5	Attendance: 3,636

=== Round 9 ===
1 December 2022	New Zealand Breakers	110–84	S.E. Melbourne Phoenix	Christchurch Arena, Christchurch
19:30	Scoring by quarter: 37–23, 26–16, 18–21, 29–24
Sky Sports	Pts: Brown 31; Rebs: Pardon 10; Asts: McDowell-White 11	boxscore report	Pts: Williams 29; Rebs: Williams 13; Asts: Adnam 5	Attendance: 3,500

1 December 2022	Brisbane Bullets	106–95(OT)	Perth Wildcats	Nissan Arena, Brisbane
18:30	Scoring by quarter: 27–25, 20–27, 23–13, 22–27, Overtime: 14–3
ESPN	Pts: Sobey 28; Rebs: Froling 13; Asts: Cadee 8	boxscore report	Pts: Cotton 30; Rebs: Travers 8 Asts: Travers 4	Attendance: 2,427

2 December 2022	Adelaide 36ers	78–75	Cairns Taipans	Adelaide Entertainment Centre, Adelaide
19:00	Scoring by quarter: 12–27, 20–20, 23–16, 23–12
ESPN	Pts: Cleveland 23; Rebs: Johnson 9 Asts: Dech 5	boxscore report	Pts: McCall 24; Rebs: Pinder 8 Asts: Scott 6	Attendance: 7,198

3 December 2022	New Zealand Breakers	84–92	Perth Wildcats	Spark Arena, Auckland
19:30	Scoring by quarter: 27–20, 20–23, 19–30, 18–19
Sky Sports	Pts: Brown 27; Rebs: Pardon 14; Asts: McDowell-White 9	boxscore report	Pts: Webster 26; Rebs: Cotton, Manek, Thomas 6 Asts: Cotton 7	Attendance: 4,884

3 December 2022	S.E. Melbourne Phoenix	78–72	Melbourne United	John Cain Arena, Melbourne
20:00	Scoring by quarter: 23–18, 22–20, 18–21, 15–13
ESPN	Pts: Williams 18; Rebs: Williams 12; Asts: Browne 7	boxscore report	Pts: Rathan-Mayes 15; Rebs: Peatling 11; Asts: Rathan-Mayes 7	Attendance: 5,651

4 December 2022	Sydney Kings	97–78	Adelaide 36ers	Qudos Bank Arena, Sydney
14:00	Scoring by quarter: 24–17, 24–21, 27–22, 22–18
10 Peach	Pts: Soares 18; Rebs: Cooks 7 Asts: Walton 11	boxscore report	Pts: Johnson 21; Rebs: Cleveland 6 Asts: McCarron 5	Attendance: 9,389

4 December 2022	Brisbane Bullets	84–99	Tasmania JackJumpers	Nissan Arena, Brisbane
15:00	Scoring by quarter: 27–24, 27–30, 18–20, 12–25
10 Peach	Pts: Sobey 20; Rebs: Gak 9 Asts: Cadee, Sobey 5	boxscore report	Pts: Doyle 33; Rebs: Doyle 9 Asts: Macdonald 4	Attendance: 3,811

5 December 2022	Illawarra Hawks	93–79	Melbourne United	WIN Entertainment Centre, Wollongong
19:30	Scoring by quarter: 31–25, 22–20, 22–18, 18–16
ESPN	Pts: Froling 29; Rebs: Deng, Froling 9 Asts: Siva 7	boxscore report	Pts: Tucker 27; Rebs: Lee 6 Asts: Goulding, Okwera, Rathan-Mayes 3	Attendance: 2,248

=== Round 10 ===
8 December 2022	New Zealand Breakers	81–88	Sydney Kings	Spark Arena, Auckland
19:30	Scoring by quarter: 25–34, 17–20, 22–25, 17–9
Sky Sports	Pts: Le'afa 17; Rebs: Vodanovich 9 Asts: McDowell-White 8	boxscore report	Pts: Walton 21; Rebs: Cooks 11; Asts: Bruce, Cooks 5	Attendance: 3,454

8 December 2022	S.E. Melbourne Phoenix	111–72	Illawarra Hawks	John Cain Arena, Melbourne
19:30	Scoring by quarter: 28–27, 30–23, 29–9, 24–13
ESPN	Pts: Broekhoff 21; Rebs: Williams 11; Asts: Browne 10	boxscore report	Pts: Frazier 20; Rebs: Mathiang 6 Asts: Siva 3	Attendance: 2,918

9 December 2022	Adelaide 36ers	90–98	Perth Wildcats	Adelaide Entertainment Centre, Adelaide
19:00	Scoring by quarter: 25–20, 21–29, 22–20, 22–29
ESPN	Pts: McCarron 20; Rebs: McCarron 13; Asts: McCarron 6	boxscore report	Pts: Cotton 32; Rebs: Thomas 8 Asts: Cotton 6	Attendance: 5,436

10 December 2022	Cairns Taipans	102–101(2OT)	Illawarra Hawks	Cairns Convention Centre, Cairns
16:30	Scoring by quarter: 16–27, 27–21, 24–15, 20–24, Overtime: 5–5, 10–9
ESPN	Pts: Hogg, McCall 23; Rebs: Pinder 14; Asts: Pinder, Scott 6	boxscore report	Pts: Frazier 26; Rebs: Deng 13; Asts: Siva 8	Attendance: 3,607

10 December 2022	Melbourne United	104–88	Brisbane Bullets	John Cain Arena, Melbourne
20:00	Scoring by quarter: 28–23, 22–18, 21–22, 33–25
ESPN	Pts: Goulding, Tucker 20; Rebs: Humphries 7 Asts: Rathan-Mayes 10	boxscore report	Pts: Sobey 24; Rebs: Gak, Mitchell 6 Asts: Cadee 5	Attendance: 5,788

11 December 2022	S.E. Melbourne Phoenix	102–84	Adelaide 36ers	John Cain Arena, Melbourne
14:00	Scoring by quarter: 27–18, 29–25, 22–17, 24–24
10 Peach	Pts: Creek 24; Rebs: Zhou Qi 10; Asts: Creek 4	boxscore report	Pts: Franks 18; Rebs: McCarron 9 Asts: McCarron 4	Attendance: 4,820

11 December 2022	Sydney Kings	76–84	Tasmania JackJumpers	Qudos Bank Arena, Sydney
16:00	Scoring by quarter: 21–23, 18–16, 31–19, 6–26
10 Peach	Pts: Walton 21; Rebs: Cooks 8 Asts: Cooks 5	boxscore report	Pts: Doyle 25; Rebs: McVeigh 9 Asts: Magette 6	Attendance: 7,321

12 December 2022	Perth Wildcats	90–89	Melbourne United	RAC Arena, Perth
18:30	Scoring by quarter: 24–21, 15–24, 22–20, 29–24
ESPN	Pts: Cotton 29; Rebs: Thomas 7 Asts: Travers 5	boxscore report	Pts: Rathan-Mayes 22; Rebs: Humphries, Lee, Tucker 8 Asts: Ili, Peatling, Rathan-Mayes, Tucker 3	Attendance: 10,459

=== Round 11 ===
14 December 2022	Cairns Taipans	85–76	Brisbane Bullets	Cairns Convention Centre, Cairns
18:30	Scoring by quarter: 21–18, 19–12, 20–22, 25–24
ESPN	Pts: Kuol 23; Rebs: Pinder 15; Asts: McCall 7	boxscore report	Pts: Baynes 17; Rebs: Gak 11; Asts: Cadee 8	Attendance: 3,497

15 December 2022	Melbourne United	92–76	S.E. Melbourne Phoenix	John Cain Arena, Melbourne
19:30	Scoring by quarter: 21–14, 26–22, 22–19, 23–21
ESPN	Pts: Tucker 33; Rebs: Rathan-Mayes 9 Asts: Rathan-Mayes 5	boxscore report	Pts: Creek 22; Rebs: Williams 12; Asts: Browne 4	Attendance: 6,228

16 December 2022	Illawarra Hawks	79–86	Sydney Kings	WIN Entertainment Centre, Wollongong
19:30	Scoring by quarter: 29–21, 14–24, 17–20, 19–21
ESPN	Pts: Harvey 19; Rebs: Mathiang 8 Asts: Siva 6	boxscore report	Pts: Cooks 21; Rebs: Cooks, Soares 9 Asts: Walton 9	Attendance: 3,288

17 December 2022	Tasmania JackJumpers	82–91	Cairns Taipans	MyState Bank Arena, Hobart
17:30	Scoring by quarter: 24–21, 28–24, 20–26, 10–20
ESPN	Pts: McVeigh 18; Rebs: Doyle 7 Asts: Magette 4	boxscore report	Pts: Pinder 34; Rebs: Hogg, Pinder 7 Asts: Scott 6	Attendance: 4,231

17 December 2022	Adelaide 36ers	108–77	Brisbane Bullets	Adelaide Entertainment Centre, Adelaide
19:30	Scoring by quarter: 28–12, 26–23, 32–22, 22–20
ESPN	Pts: Franks 25; Rebs: Cleveland 9 Asts: Dech, McCarron 4	boxscore report	Pts: Cadee 18; Rebs: Baynes 11; Asts: Sobey 8	Attendance: 6,003

18 December 2022	S.E. Melbourne Phoenix	113–112(2OT)	Sydney Kings	Gippsland Regional Indoor Sports Stadium, Traralgon
14:00	Scoring by quarter: 25–18, 20–35, 23–22, 26–19, Overtime: 8–8, 11–10
10 Peach	Pts: Creek 46; Rebs: Creek 10; Asts: Adnam 6	boxscore report	Pts: Walton 45; Rebs: Simon 9 Asts: Walton 10	Attendance: 3,000

18 December 2022	Melbourne United	88–77	Illawarra Hawks	John Cain Arena, Melbourne
16:00	Scoring by quarter: 24–19, 22–18, 18–25, 24–15
10 Peach	Pts: Goulding 25; Rebs: Peatling 11; Asts: Ili 7	boxscore report	Pts: Frazier 27; Rebs: Deng, Froling, Harvey 6 Asts: Siva 4	Attendance: 6,806

19 December 2022	Adelaide 36ers	93–82	Tasmania JackJumpers	Adelaide Entertainment Centre, Adelaide
19:00	Scoring by quarter: 29–22, 12–22, 25–22, 27–16
ESPN	Pts: Cleveland 20; Rebs: Cleveland 10; Asts: McCarron 5	boxscore report	Pts: Doyle 18; Rebs: Doyle 6 Asts: Magette 6	Attendance: 7,010

20 December 2022	Cairns Taipans	83–105	Perth Wildcats	Cairns Convention Centre, Cairns
18:30	Scoring by quarter: 17–27, 23–28, 25–24, 18–26
ESPN	Pts: Hogg 24; Rebs: McCall 10; Asts: McCall 4	boxscore report	Pts: Cotton 24; Rebs: Thomas 12; Asts: Thomas 6	Attendance: 3,752

=== Round 12 ===
21 December 2022	Brisbane Bullets	77–104	S.E. Melbourne Phoenix	Nissan Arena, Brisbane
18:30	Scoring by quarter: 22–20, 25–36, 14–23, 16–25
ESPN	Pts: Sobey 31; Rebs: Baynes 8 Asts: Cadee 7	boxscore report	Pts: Creek 29; Rebs: Kell, Pineau 10; Asts: Kell 6	Attendance: 3,375
Note: Original date – 4 February 2023

22 December 2022	Tasmania JackJumpers	87–60	Illawarra Hawks	MyState Bank Arena, Hobart
19:30	Scoring by quarter: 15–21, 29–14, 25–13, 18–12
ESPN	Pts: McVeigh 15; Rebs: Doyle 8 Asts: Doyle, Macdonald, Magette 4	boxscore report	Pts: Froling 19; Rebs: Froling 8 Asts: Siva 9	Attendance: 4,269

23 December 2022	Melbourne United	84–81	Cairns Taipans	John Cain Arena, Melbourne
19:30	Scoring by quarter: 26–21, 21–18, 15–15, 22–27
ESPN	Pts: Tucker 27; Rebs: Lee 10; Asts: Peatling, Rathan-Mayes 4	boxscore report	Pts: McCall 21; Rebs: Pinder 8 Asts: McCall 5	Attendance: 10,175

24 December 2022	Adelaide 36ers	94–88	S.E. Melbourne Phoenix	Adelaide Entertainment Centre, Adelaide
17:00	Scoring by quarter: 26–32, 23–15, 23–22, 22–19
ESPN	Pts: Franks, Johnson 20; Rebs: Cleveland 11; Asts: Cleveland 5	boxscore report	Pts: Creek 24; Rebs: Creek 5 Asts: Kell 4	Attendance: 6,033

25 December 2022	Sydney Kings	101–80	Melbourne United	Qudos Bank Arena, Sydney
18:30	Scoring by quarter: 29–17, 17–23, 22–15, 33–25
10 HD	Pts: Cooks 24; Rebs: Cooks 11; Asts: Cooks 7	boxscore report	Pts: Tucker 31; Rebs: Okwera 12; Asts: Ili 7	Attendance: 7,012

26 December 2022	Tasmania JackJumpers	93–82	New Zealand Breakers	MyState Bank Arena, Hobart
19:30	Scoring by quarter: 27–17, 19–19, 24–23, 23–23
ESPN	Pts: Magette 16; Rebs: Magnay 9 Asts: Doyle, Magette 4	boxscore report	Pts: Le'afa 21; Rebs: Pardon 8 Asts: Le'afa 5	Attendance: 4,269

27 December 2022	Brisbane Bullets	97–93(OT)	Perth Wildcats	Nissan Arena, Brisbane
18:30	Scoring by quarter: 16–19, 25–21, 27–18, 19–29, Overtime: 10–6
ESPN	Pts: Sobey 30; Rebs: Baynes 10; Asts: Sobey 9	boxscore report	Pts: Cotton 30; Rebs: Travers 10; Asts: Cotton 6	Attendance: 3,737

=== Round 13 ===
29 December 2022	Adelaide 36ers	87–84	Brisbane Bullets	Adelaide Entertainment Centre, Adelaide
19:00	Scoring by quarter: 29–27, 25–24, 8–15, 25–18
ESPN	Pts: Franks 18; Rebs: Drmic 11; Asts: Cleveland 5	boxscore report	Pts: Sobey 24; Rebs: Baynes 12; Asts: Cadee, Froling 3	Attendance: 9,263

30 December 2022	Sydney Kings	97–77	Tasmania JackJumpers	Qudos Bank Arena, Sydney
19:30	Scoring by quarter: 25–26, 29–18, 23–18, 20–15
ESPN	Pts: Cooks 23; Rebs: Cooks, Vasiljevic 7 Asts: Walton 7	boxscore report	Pts: Steindl 13; Rebs: Krslovic 3 Asts: Magette 3	Attendance: 12,467

31 December 2022	Illawarra Hawks	97–107	Perth Wildcats	WIN Entertainment Centre, Wollongong
17:30	Scoring by quarter: 28–30, 16–31, 28–14, 25–32
ESPN	Pts: Harvey 28; Rebs: Froling 13; Asts: Froling, Siva 3	boxscore report	Pts: Webster 25; Rebs: Manek 10; Asts: Cotton 6	Attendance: 3,776

31 December 2022	Cairns Taipans	86–83	Adelaide 36ers	Cairns Convention Centre, Cairns
19:00	Scoring by quarter: 18–20, 23–20, 13–24, 32–19
ESPN	Pts: Scott 31; Rebs: Davey 5 Asts: McCall 5	boxscore report	Pts: Cleveland 16; Rebs: Franks 8 Asts: McCarron 5	Attendance: 4,851

1 January 2023	Tasmania JackJumpers	99–74	S.E. Melbourne Phoenix	MyState Bank Arena, Hobart
14:00	Scoring by quarter: 32–18, 25–25, 21–17, 21–14
10 Peach	Pts: Doyle 25; Rebs: Kelly 8 Asts: Doyle 7	boxscore report	Pts: Williams 21; Rebs: Williams 11; Asts: Creek, Foxwell 4	Attendance: 4,269

1 January 2023	Brisbane Bullets	86–99	Melbourne United	Nissan Arena, Brisbane
15:00	Scoring by quarter: 20–22, 23–21, 21–29, 22–27
10 Peach	Pts: Gak 18; Rebs: Gak 13; Asts: Sobey 4	boxscore report	Pts: Goulding, Tucker 20; Rebs: Humphries 9 Asts: Rathan-Mayes 6	Attendance: 4,781

2 January 2023	Illawarra Hawks	89–96	Cairns Taipans	WIN Entertainment Centre, Wollongong
19:30	Scoring by quarter: 26–27, 22–31, 23–16, 18–22
ESPN	Pts: Froling 25; Rebs: Froling 13; Asts: Froling 5	boxscore report	Pts: Scott 18; Rebs: Waardenburg 9 Asts: McCall, Scott 6	Attendance: 2,718

=== Round 14 ===
4 January 2023	New Zealand Breakers	97–94	Perth Wildcats	TSB Stadium, New Plymouth
19:30	Scoring by quarter: 17–22, 31–27, 26–16, 23–29
Sky Sports	Pts: Brown 23; Rebs: Abercrombie, Brantley 7 Asts: Brown 6	boxscore report	Pts: Cotton 32; Rebs: Manek 7 Asts: Cotton 5	Attendance: 2,200

4 January 2023	Sydney Kings	118–102	S.E. Melbourne Phoenix	Qudos Bank Arena, Sydney
19:30	Scoring by quarter: 24–30, 34–25, 31–25, 29–22
ESPN	Pts: Vasiljevic 42; Rebs: Cooks 7 Asts: Vasiljevic 5	boxscore report	Pts: Creek 32; Rebs: Williams 10; Asts: Adnam 6	Attendance: 11,321

5 January 2023	Brisbane Bullets	81–107	Cairns Taipans	Nissan Arena, Brisbane
18:30	Scoring by quarter: 18–24, 19–31, 22–30, 22–22
ESPN	Pts: Johnson 32; Rebs: Gak 7 Asts: Johnson 4	boxscore report	Pts: Waardenburg 24; Rebs: Waardenburg 8 Asts: Kuol, McCall 6	Attendance: 4,258

6 January 2023	Adelaide 36ers	103–95	Illawarra Hawks	Adelaide Entertainment Centre, Adelaide
19:00	Scoring by quarter: 23–19, 27–28, 25–28, 28–20
ESPN	Pts: Johnson 18; Rebs: Johnson 8 Asts: Cleveland, Clark 5	boxscore report	Pts: Harvey 22; Rebs: Froling 10; Asts: Deng 3	Attendance: 9,308

7 January 2023	Tasmania JackJumpers	85–92	Melbourne United	MyState Bank Arena, Hobart
17:30	Scoring by quarter: 20–17, 24–27, 19–27, 22–21
ESPN	Pts: Doyle 20; Rebs: Kelly 6 Asts: Magette 5	boxscore report	Pts: Goulding 23; Rebs: Lee 10; Asts: Ili 8	Attendance: 4,269

7 January 2023	Sydney Kings	108–87	Perth Wildcats	Qudos Bank Arena, Sydney
20:00	Scoring by quarter: 27–14, 32–27, 23–26, 26–20
	Pts: Cooks 24; Rebs: Cooks 11; Asts: Bruce, Cooks, Vasiljevic 4	boxscore report	Pts: Cotton, C.Webster 22; Rebs: Thomas 8 Asts: Cotton 5	Attendance: 11,073

8 January 2023	Adelaide 36ers	83–85	New Zealand Breakers	Adelaide Entertainment Centre, Adelaide
13:30	Scoring by quarter: 15–19, 23–26, 25–23, 20–17
10 Peach	Pts: Franks 20; Rebs: Franks 13; Asts: McCarron 4	boxscore report	Pts: Brown 16; Rebs: Pardon 7 Asts: McDowell-White 7	Attendance: 9,368

8 January 2023	Cairns Taipans	94–85	S.E. Melbourne Phoenix	Cairns Convention Centre, Cairns
15:00	Scoring by quarter: 24–35, 33–14, 19–13, 18–23
10 Peach	Pts: McCall 24; Rebs: Waardenburg 7 Asts: Hogg, Scott 7	boxscore report	Pts: Creek 25; Rebs: Williams 10; Asts: Williams 5	Attendance: 4,457

=== Round 15 ===
10 January 2023	Illawarra Hawks	89–92	Tasmania JackJumpers	WIN Entertainment Centre, Wollongong
19:30	Scoring by quarter: 26–29, 21–25, 17–15, 25–23
ESPN	Pts: Harvey 22; Rebs: Froling 8 Asts: Froling 8	boxscore report	Pts: Kelly 18; Rebs: Magette 7 Asts: Doyle, Magette 6	Attendance: 2,846

10 January 2022	Perth Wildcats	93–90	New Zealand Breakers	RAC Arena, Perth
18:30	Scoring by quarter: 20–17, 20–22, 27–33, 26–18
ESPN	Pts: Thomas 23; Rebs: Thomas 10; Asts: Cotton, Manek, Thomas, Webster 3	boxscore report	Pts: Pardon 28; Rebs: Pardon 12; Asts: White 8	Attendance: 11,668
Note: Original date – 16 December 2022

11 January 2023	Brisbane Bullets	67–116	Sydney Kings	Nissan Arena, Brisbane
18:30	Scoring by quarter: 21–24, 19–35, 15–29, 12–28
ESPN	Pts: Sobey 14; Rebs: Baynes 7 Asts: Cadee 4	boxscore report	Pts: Cooks, Soares 20; Rebs: Galloway, Soares 6 Asts: Cooks 8	Attendance: 4,068

12 January 2023	New Zealand Breakers	65–77	Melbourne United	Christchurch Arena, Christchurch
19:30	Scoring by quarter: 13–18, 17–25, 17–13, 18–21
Sky Sports	Pts: Brantley 17; Rebs: McDowell-White 8 Asts: McDowell-White 6	boxscore report	Pts: Rathan-Mayes 20; Rebs: Lee 9 Asts: Lee 5	Attendance: 5,217

12 January 2023	Tasmania JackJumpers	98–82	Adelaide 36ers	MyState Bank Arena, Hobart
19:30	Scoring by quarter: 23–17, 23–19, 23–25, 29–21
ESPN	Pts: Doyle, McVeigh 28; Rebs: Doyle, McVeigh 6 Asts: Magette 5	boxscore report	Pts: Franks 24; Rebs: Sotto 7 Asts: Clark 6	Attendance: 4,293

13 January 2023	Cairns Taipans	89–84	Illawarra Hawks	Cairns Convention Centre, Cairns
18:30	Scoring by quarter: 23–24, 22–16, 22–21, 22–23
ESPN	Pts: McCall 24; Rebs: McCall 11; Asts: Scott 6	boxscore report	Pts: Harvey 25; Rebs: Deng, Mathiang 8 Asts: Harvey 5	Attendance: 4,063

14 January 2023	Brisbane Bullets	91–101	Melbourne United	Nissan Arena, Brisbane
16:30	Scoring by quarter: 20–34, 17–20, 28–22, 26–25
ESPN	Pts: Baynes 21; Rebs: Baynes 11; Asts: Sobey 6	boxscore report	Pts: Tucker 30; Rebs: Lee 6 Asts: Ili 7	Attendance: 4,703

14 January 2023	Perth Wildcats	112–97	Adelaide 36ers	RAC Arena, Perth
17:00	Scoring by quarter: 32–17, 35–29, 25–17, 20–34
ESPN	Pts: Cotton, Manek 23; Rebs: Manek 10; Asts: T.Webster 7	boxscore report	Pts: Franks 25; Rebs: Cleveland 6 Asts: Cleveland 4	Attendance: 13,087

15 January 2023	New Zealand Breakers	83–85	Cairns Taipans	Spark Arena, Auckland
16:00	Scoring by quarter: 14–21, 26–27, 25–20, 18–27
10 Peach	Pts: McDowell-White 29; Rebs: Brantley 14; Asts: McDowell-White 5	boxscore report	Pts: Hogg, Kuol, McCall 18; Rebs: Waardenburg 10; Asts: Ayre, Scott 3	Attendance: 7,194

15 January 2023	Sydney Kings	84–79	Illawarra Hawks	Qudos Bank Arena, Sydney
16:00	Scoring by quarter: 19–24, 18–13, 26–17, 21–25
10 Peach	Pts: Walton 19; Rebs: Cooks 9 Asts: Walton 7	boxscore report	Pts: Harvey 24; Rebs: Deng, Froling 9 Asts: Froling 5	Attendance: 12,986

16 January 2023	S.E. Melbourne Phoenix	79–84	Brisbane Bullets	State Basketball Centre, Melbourne
19:30	Scoring by quarter: 24–18, 17–30, 22–13, 16–23
ESPN	Pts: Williams 19; Rebs: Creek 13; Asts: Browne 6	boxscore report	Pts: Cadee 28; Rebs: Froling, Mitchell 5 Asts: Cadee, Froling, Mitchell 3	Attendance: 3,333

=== Round 16 ===
18 January 2023	Tasmania JackJumpers	75–86	S.E. Melbourne Phoenix	Silverdome, Launceston
19:30	Scoring by quarter: 14–24, 18–22, 24–18, 19–22
ESPN	Pts: Doyle 16; Rebs: Magnay 7 Asts: Doyle 6	boxscore report	Pts: Creek 23; Rebs: Creek 11; Asts: Creek, Kell 5	Attendance: 3,286

19 January 2023	New Zealand Breakers	76–78	Illawarra Hawks	Spark Arena, Auckland
19:30	Scoring by quarter: 14–27, 21–12, 15–19, 26–20
Sky Sports	Pts: Pardon 19; Rebs: Pardon 17; Asts: McDowell-White 7	boxscore report	Pts: Harvey 25; Rebs: Grida 7 Asts: Hickey 4	Attendance: 3,967

19 January 2023	Brisbane Bullets	106–101(OT)	Adelaide 36ers	Nissan Arena, Brisbane
18:30	Scoring by quarter: 27–20, 20–18, 26–32, 18–21, Overtime: 15–10
ESPN	Pts: Johnson 27; Rebs: Baynes 11; Asts: Sobey 6	boxscore report	Pts: Drmic 20; Rebs: Harris, Sotto 7 Asts: Clark 8	Attendance: 3,953

20 January 2023	Cairns Taipans	77–85	Tasmania JackJumpers	Cairns Convention Centre, Cairns
18:30	Scoring by quarter: 17–14, 13–20, 25–28, 22–23
ESPN	Pts: Hogg, Kuol 17; Rebs: Kuol 8 Asts: Scott 6	boxscore report	Pts: McVeigh 18; Rebs: Doyle, Magette 6 Asts: Doyle 8	Attendance: 4,705

20 January 2023	Perth Wildcats	111–104	Sydney Kings	RAC Arena, Perth
18:30	Scoring by quarter: 26–20, 28–28, 22–32, 35–24
ESPN	Pts: Cotton, Manek 21; Rebs: C.Webster 10; Asts: Cotton 11	boxscore report	Pts: Vasiljevic 26; Rebs: Cooks 9 Asts: Cooks 8	Attendance: 13,038

21 January 2023	Illawarra Hawks	86–103	Brisbane Bullets	WIN Entertainment Centre, Wollongong
17:30	Scoring by quarter: 20–24, 28–26, 19–23, 19–30
ESPN	Pts: Harvey 22; Rebs: Deng, Mathiang 6 Asts: Dent, Froling 3	boxscore report	Pts: Johnson 23; Rebs: Froling 9 Asts: Sobey 6	Attendance: 3,503

21 January 2023	Adelaide 36ers	87–94	Melbourne United	Adelaide Entertainment Centre, Adelaide
19:30	Scoring by quarter: 21–28, 19–11, 24–31, 23–24
ESPN	Pts: Franks 24; Rebs: Franks 10; Asts: Franks 6	boxscore report	Pts: Goulding 28; Rebs: Tucker 10; Asts: Ili 5	Attendance: 9,505

22 January 2023	S.E. Melbourne Phoenix	112–91	Perth Wildcats	State Basketball Centre, Melbourne
14:00	Scoring by quarter: 27–22, 34–33, 22–21, 29–15
10 Peach	Pts: Williams 27; Rebs: Williams 14; Asts: Browne 8	boxscore report	Pts: Cotton 25; Rebs: Cotton, Travers 5 Asts: Travers 5	Attendance: 3,300

22 January 2023	Sydney Kings	88–93	New Zealand Breakers	Qudos Bank Arena, Sydney
16:00	Scoring by quarter: 17–22, 24–33, 27–15, 20–23
10 Peach	Pts: Walton 17; Rebs: Walton 6 Asts: Cooks, Walton 4	boxscore report	Pts: Brantley 30; Rebs: Brantley 9 Asts: McDowell-White 10	Attendance: 14,232

=== Round 17 ===
25 January 2023	S.E. Melbourne Phoenix	85–80	Cairns Taipans	State Basketball Centre, Melbourne
19:30	Scoring by quarter: 19–24, 25–19, 18–15, 23–22
ESPN	Pts: Creek 21; Rebs: Williams 13; Asts: Browne 5	boxscore report	Pts: Hogg 24; Rebs: Waardenburg 10; Asts: Waardenburg 4	Attendance: 3,300

26 January 2023	Brisbane Bullets	71–99	New Zealand Breakers	Nissan Arena, Brisbane
18:30	Scoring by quarter: 20–22, 20–33, 14–19, 17–25
ESPN	Pts: Johnson 20; Rebs: Baynes, Johnson, Sobey 5 Asts: Sobey 8	boxscore report	Pts: Brantley 22; Rebs: Pardon 9 Asts: McDowell-White, Rupert 4	Attendance: 3,636

27 January 2023	Tasmania JackJumpers	77–91	Sydney Kings	MyState Bank Arena, Hobart
19:30	Scoring by quarter: 25–14, 14–37, 15–23, 23–17
ESPN	Pts: White 11; Rebs: Kelly 6 Asts: Doyle 3	boxscore report	Pts: Vasiljevic 24; Rebs: Glover 7 Asts: Bruce, Walton 4	Attendance: 4,293

27 January 2023	Perth Wildcats	106–86	Illawarra Hawks	RAC Arena, Perth
18:30	Scoring by quarter: 25–25, 25–30, 34–23, 22–8
ESPN	Pts: Cotton 40; Rebs: Cotton, Manek, Travers, C.Webster 7 Asts: Cotton, Wagstaff 4	boxscore report	Pts: Harvey 23; Rebs: Froling 10; Asts: Hickey 5	Attendance: 12,521

28 January 2023	New Zealand Breakers	80–74	Melbourne United	Spark Arena, Auckland
19:30	Scoring by quarter: 10–19, 21–15, 27–22, 22–18
Sky Sports	Pts: Brantley 18; Rebs: Pardon 8 Asts: McDowell-White 6	boxscore report	Pts: Rathan-Mayes 15; Rebs: Lee, Rathan-Mayes 7 Asts: Lee 3	Attendance: 6,488

28 January 2023	Cairns Taipans	94–87	Brisbane Bullets	Cairns Convention Centre, Cairns
19:00	Scoring by quarter: 21–27, 30–23, 19–18, 24–19
ESPN	Pts: Hogg, Kuol, McCall 23; Rebs: Waardenburg 10; Asts: Hogg 6	boxscore report	Pts: Sobey 27; Rebs: Mitchell 8 Asts: Johnson 7	Attendance: 4,437

29 January 2023	Tasmania JackJumpers	102–94	Perth Wildcats	MyState Bank Arena, Hobart
14:00	Scoring by quarter: 32–21, 25–33, 18–25, 27–15
10 Peach	Pts: Doyle 21; Rebs: Kelly, McVeigh 5 Asts: Magette 11	boxscore report	Pts: Thomas 19; Rebs: Thomas 10; Asts: Thomas, Travers, C.Webster 4	Attendance: 4,293

29 January 2023	Sydney Kings	111–106	S.E. Melbourne Phoenix	Qudos Bank Arena, Sydney
16:00	Scoring by quarter: 28–25, 28–26, 28–27, 27–28
10 Peach	Pts: Walton 22; Rebs: Cooks 10; Asts: Cooks 10	boxscore report	Pts: Creek 29; Rebs: Williams 12; Asts: Browne 8	Attendance: 13,273

30 January 2023	Cairns Taipans	96–99	Adelaide 36ers	Cairns Convention Centre, Cairns
18:30	Scoring by quarter: 24–25, 29–25, 24–25, 19–24
ESPN	Pts: Hogg, Waardenburg 26; Rebs: McCall 10; Asts: McCall 7	boxscore report	Pts: Cleveland 27; Rebs: Franks 9 Asts: Franks, McCarron 5	Attendance: 3,530

=== Round 18 ===
2 February 2023	Illawarra Hawks	81–91	New Zealand Breakers	WIN Entertainment Centre, Wollongong
19:30	Scoring by quarter: 30–21, 20–13, 9–29, 22–28
ESPN	Pts: Harvey 22; Rebs: Froling, Gak, Hickey 6 Asts: Froling 5	boxscore report	Pts: Brown 22; Rebs: Abercrombie, Brantley 6 Asts: Le'afa, McDowell-White 4	Attendance: 2,039

3 February 2023	Adelaide 36ers	115–108	Sydney Kings	Adelaide Entertainment Centre, Adelaide
19:00	Scoring by quarter: 35–29, 24–30, 22–27, 34–22
ESPN	Pts: Cleveland 23; Rebs: Sotto 7 Asts: Cleveland 7	boxscore report	Pts: Soares 24; Rebs: Simon, Soares 7 Asts: Walton 13	Attendance: 9,558

3 February 2023	Perth Wildcats	71–84	Cairns Taipans	RAC Arena, Perth
18:30	Scoring by quarter: 16–30, 21–19, 19–15, 15–20
ESPN	Pts: Cotton 28; Rebs: Cotton 13; Asts: Cotton 7	boxscore report	Pts: Kuol 15; Rebs: Deng 11; Asts: Scott 4	Attendance: 11,668

4 February 2023	Illawarra Hawks	63–87	Tasmania JackJumpers	WIN Entertainment Centre, Wollongong
17:30	Scoring by quarter: 15–25, 20–21, 12–22, 16–19
ESPN	Pts: Harvey 13; Rebs: Froling, Grida 7 Asts: Dent 2	boxscore report	Pts: Doyle 20; Rebs: Krslovic 9 Asts: Doyle 10	Attendance: 3,511

4 February 2023	Brisbane Bullets	75–80(OT)	New Zealand Breakers	Nissan Arena, Brisbane
19:00	Scoring by quarter: 18–16, 24–20, 12–18, 17–17, Overtime: 4–9
ESPN	Pts: Baynes 17; Rebs: Mitchell 8 Asts: Gak 4	boxscore report	Pts: Brantley 19; Rebs: McDowell-White 8 Asts: McDowell-White 9	Attendance: 5,253
Note: Original date – 21 December 2022

5 February 2023	Melbourne United	116–107	Adelaide 36ers	John Cain Arena, Melbourne
14:00	Scoring by quarter: 27–27, 29–30, 31–23, 29–27
10 Peach	Pts: Tucker 31; Rebs: Humphries, Lee 9 Asts: Rathan-Mayes, Tucker 5	boxscore report	Pts: Cleveland 30; Rebs: Cleveland 6 Asts: Clark, Dech 4	Attendance: 10,175

5 February 2023	Perth Wildcats	96–84	Sydney Kings	RAC Arena, Perth
13:00	Scoring by quarter: 16–21, 24–15, 29–21, 27–27
10 Peach	Pts: C.Webster 26; Rebs: Travers 11; Asts: Travers 6	boxscore report	Pts: Vasiljevic 18; Rebs: Glover, Vasiljevic 7 Asts: Bruce 7	Attendance: 12,712

== Ladder ==
Pos	2022–23 NBL season											
Pos	Team	Pld	W	L	PCT	Last 5	Streak	Home	Away	PF	PA	PP
1	Sydney Kings	28	19	9	67.86%	2–3	L2	10–4	9–5	2679	2468	108.55%
2	New Zealand Breakers	28	18	10	64.29%	5–0	W5	7–7	11–3	2423	2246	107.88%
3	Cairns Taipans	28	18	10	64.29%	2–3	W1	8–6	10–4	2455	2376	103.32%
4	Tasmania JackJumpers	28	16	12	57.14%	3–2	W2	7–7	9–5	2385	2305	103.47%
5	S.E. Melbourne Phoenix	28	15	13	53.57%	3–2	L1	11–3	4–10	2553	2512	101.63%
6	Perth Wildcats	28	15	13	53.57%	2–3	W1	9–5	6–8	2580	2568	100.47%
7	Melbourne United	28	15	13	53.57%	4–1	W1	8–6	7–7	2434	2424	100.41%
8	Adelaide 36ers	28	13	15	46.43%	2–3	L1	8–6	5–9	2546	2597	98.04%
9	Brisbane Bullets	28	8	20	28.57%	2–3	L3	4–10	4–10	2365	2600	90.96%
10	Illawarra Hawks	28	3	25	10.71%	1–4	L4	2–12	1–13	2261	2585	87.47%

Updated to match(es) played on 5 February 2023. Source: NBL.com.au

The NBL tie-breaker system as outlined in the NBL Rules and Regulations states that in the case of an identical win–loss record, the overall points percentage will determine order of seeding.

=== Ladder progression ===
Leader and qualification to semifinals
Qualification to semifinals
Qualification to play-in games
Last place

2022–23 NBL season
Team ╲ Round	1	2	3	4	5	6	7	8	9	10	11	12	13	14	15	16	17	18
Adelaide 36ers	—	—	7	4	8	8	7	6	6	7	7	7	7	5	8	8	8	8
Brisbane Bullets	9	9	10	9	9	9	9	9	8	9	9	9	9	9	9	9	9	9
Cairns Taipans	1	3	4	3	4	3	3	3	3	4	3	4	3	3	2	2	2	3
Illawarra Hawks	7	6	9	10	10	10	10	10	10	10	10	10	10	10	10	10	10	10
Melbourne United	5	5	6	8	6	6	8	8	9	8	8	8	8	8	6	7	7	7
New Zealand Breakers	6	4	3	2	1	2	2	1	2	2	1	2	2	2	3	3	3	2
Perth Wildcats	2	1	2	5	7	7	5	7	7	6	5	6	5	7	5	5	5	6
S.E. Melbourne Phoenix	4	7	8	7	3	4	4	4	4	3	4	3	4	6	7	6	6	5
Sydney Kings	3	2	1	1	2	1	1	2	1	1	2	1	1	1	1	1	1	1
Tasmania JackJumpers	8	8	5	6	5	5	6	5	5	5	6	5	6	4	4	4	4	4

Updated to match(es) played on 5 February 2023. Source: NBL.com.au

== Finals ==
The 2023 NBL Finals were played in February and March 2023, consisting of three play-in games, two best-of-three semifinal series and the best-of-five Championship Series. In the semifinals, the higher seed hosts the first and third games. In the Championship Series, the higher seed hosts the first, third and fifth games. This will be the first season the league will introduce play-in games.

The top two seeds in the regular season will automatically qualify to the semifinals. Teams ranked three to six will compete in the play-in tournament. The third seed will play the fourth seed for third spot and the loser will play the winner of fifth or sixth for the fourth seed.

=== Playoff bracket ===
Play-in / Seeding qualifier
5	S.E. Melbourne Phoenix	99
6	Perth Wildcats	106
3	Cairns Taipans	79
4	Tasmania JackJumpers	87

Play-in game
3	Cairns Taipans	91
6	Perth Wildcats	78

Semifinals
1	Sydney Kings	95	82	79
3	Cairns Taipans	87	93	64
2	New Zealand Breakers	88	78	92
4	Tasmania JackJumpers	68	89	77

Championship
1	Sydney Kings	87	81	91	70	77
2	New Zealand Breakers	95	74	68	80	69

== Awards ==
=== Pre-season ===
- Loggins-Bruton Cup: Adelaide 36ers
- Most Valuable Player (Ray Borner Medal): Jack McVeigh (Tasmania JackJumpers)

=== Regular season ===
==== Awards Night ====
- Most Valuable Player (Andrew Gaze Trophy): Xavier Cooks (Sydney Kings)
- Next Generation Award: Sam Waardenburg (Cairns Taipans)
- Best Defensive Player (Damian Martin Trophy): Antonius Cleveland (Adelaide 36ers)
- Best Sixth Man: Barry Brown Jr. (New Zealand Breakers)
- Most Improved Player: Keanu Pinder (Cairns Taipans)
- Fans MVP: Kai Sotto (Adelaide 36ers)
- Coach of the Year (Lindsay Gaze Trophy): Adam Forde (Cairns Taipans)
- Executive of the Year: Mark Beecroft (Cairns Taipans)
- Referee of the Year: Vaughan Mayberry
- GameTime by Kmart: Reuben Te Rangi (S.E. Melbourne Phoenix)
- All-NBL First Team:
  - Mitch Creek (S.E. Melbourne Phoenix)
  - Xavier Cooks (Sydney Kings)
  - Bryce Cotton (Perth Wildcats)
  - Derrick Walton (Sydney Kings)
  - Milton Doyle (Tasmania JackJumpers)
- All-NBL Second Team:
  - Keanu Pinder (Cairns Taipans)
  - Dererk Pardon (New Zealand Breakers)
  - Barry Brown Jr. (New Zealand Breakers)
  - D. J. Hogg (Cairns Taipans)
  - Chris Goulding (Melbourne United)

=== Postseason ===
- Championship Series MVP (Larry Sengstock Medal): Derrick Walton (Sydney Kings)
- NBL Champions: Sydney Kings
