= Antonius Cleveland =

American basketball player (born 1994)

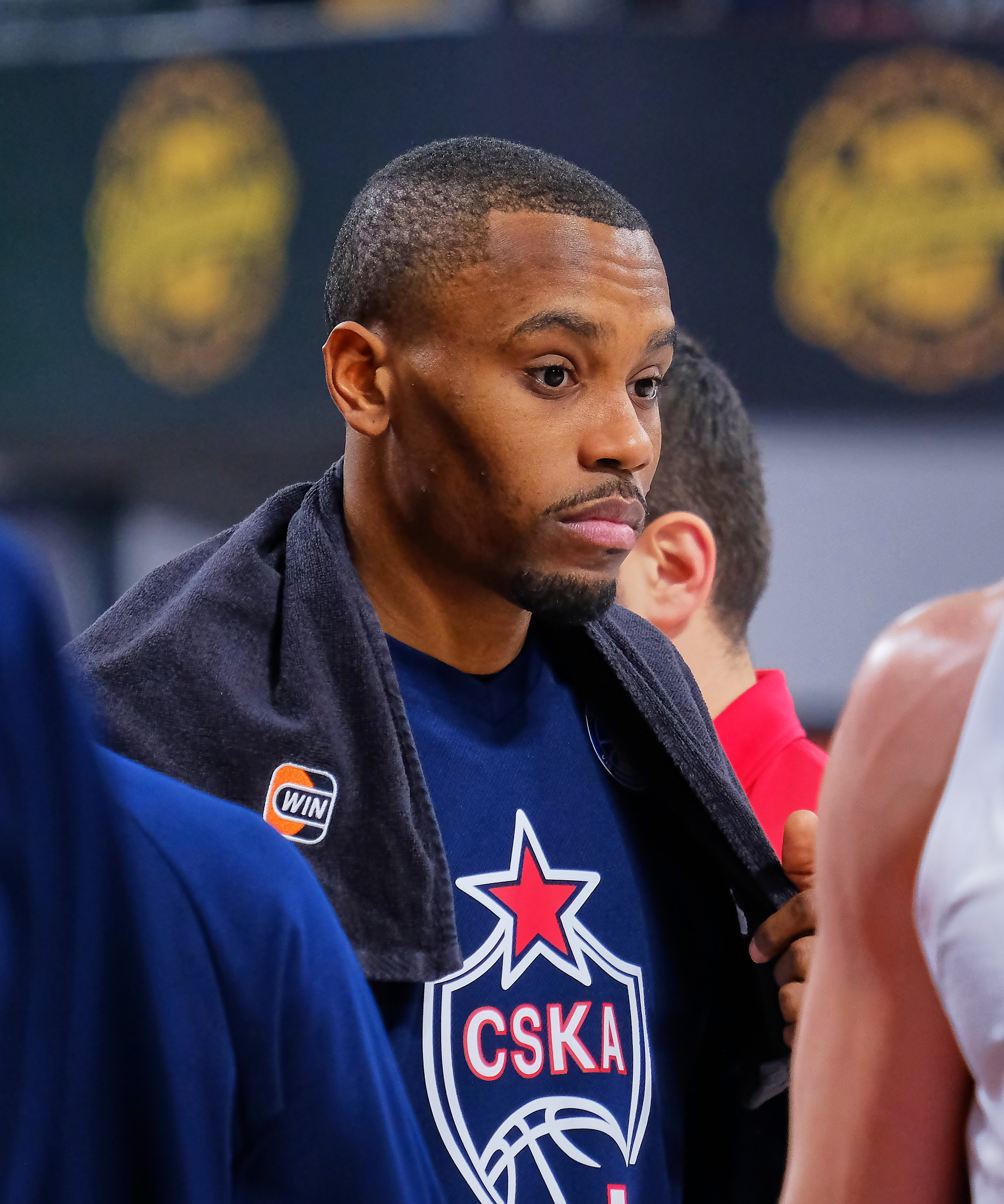
- Cleveland with CSKA Moscow in 2025

No. 1 – CSKA Moscow
- Position: Small forward / shooting guard
- League: VTB United League

Personal information
- Born: February 2, 1994 (age 32) Memphis, Tennessee, U.S.
- Listed height: 6 ft 5 in (1.96 m)
- Listed weight: 198 lb (90 kg)

Career information
- High school: Overton (Memphis, Tennessee); Germantown (Germantown, Tennessee); Faith Baptist Christian Academy (Ludowici, Georgia)
- College: Southeast Missouri State (2013–2017)
- NBA draft: 2017: undrafted
- Playing career: 2017–present

Career history
- 2017: Santa Cruz Warriors
- 2017: Dallas Mavericks
- 2017: →Texas Legends
- 2018: Atlanta Hawks
- 2018–2019: Santa Cruz Warriors
- 2019–2020: Dallas Mavericks
- 2019–2020: →Texas Legends
- 2021: Oklahoma City Blue
- 2021–2022: Illawarra Hawks
- 2022–2023: Adelaide 36ers
- 2023: Hapoel Eilat
- 2023–2024: Maccabi Tel Aviv
- 2024–2025: Lokomotiv Kuban
- 2025–present: CSKA Moscow

Career highlights
- VTB United League champion (2026); VTB League Supercup winner (2025); VTB United League Defensive Player of the Year (2025); Israeli League champion (2024); All-NBL First Team (2022); 2× NBL Best Defensive Player (2022, 2023); First-team All-OVC (2017)
- Stats at NBA.com
- Stats at Basketball Reference

Antonius Cleveland (born February 2, 1994) is an American professional basketball player for CSKA Moscow of the VTB United League. He played college basketball for the Southeast Missouri State Redhawks. He played in the NBA for the Dallas Mavericks and Atlanta Hawks.

== Early life ==
Cleveland was born in Memphis, Tennessee, as the only child of mother Shonda Bowie. Bowie worked two jobs to support herself and Cleveland: as a nutrition supervisor for Memphis City Schools during the day and with FedEx during the night.

Cleveland started his basketball career at Overton High School in Memphis for his freshman and sophomore seasons. He transferred to Germantown High School in nearby Germantown for his junior season. Cleveland spent his senior year at Faith Baptist Christian Academy in Ludowici, Georgia.

== College career ==
Cleveland played for Southeast Missouri State University for four seasons, where he was the team's leading scorer in his junior (15.2 PPG; 10th in the conference) and senior (16.6 PPG; 7th in the conference) years. In his junior year he was also 5th in the conference with 1.6 steals per game, 9th with 6.6 rebounds per game, and 10th with a .437 field goal percentage. In his senior year he was also 3rd in the conference in steals per game (1.4), and 5th in field goal percentage (.543). He was selected to the All-Ohio Valley Conference (OVC) first-team in 2017.

== Professional career ==
=== Dallas Mavericks (2017) ===
After going undrafted in the 2017 NBA draft, Cleveland signed with the Portland Trail Blazers to join their roster for the 2017 NBA Summer League. While playing for Portland, he averaged 5.8 ppg in six games coming off the bench. On July 27, 2017, Cleveland signed with the Golden State Warriors on a training camp deal. On September 30, Cleveland was waived by the Warriors. He was then assigned to the Santa Cruz Warriors NBA G League affiliate team on October 24, 2017.

On November 17, 2017, Cleveland signed a two-way contract with the Dallas Mavericks. He made his NBA debut later that night in a 111–87 blowout loss to the Minnesota Timberwolves, recording 2 points and 2 rebounds in 6 minutes of play. Throughout his time on that two-way deal, he would split his playing time between the Mavericks and their G League affiliate, the Texas Legends. On December 18, 2017, he was injured in a 97–91 loss to the Phoenix Suns. He was waived from the team a day later, with his spot on the team being replaced by Kyle Collinsworth.

=== Atlanta Hawks (2018) ===
On February 22, 2018, the Atlanta Hawks signed Cleveland to a 10-day contract. He signed his second 10-day contract with Atlanta on March 4. On March 14, 2018, Atlanta signed Cleveland to a multi-year contract. On July 21, 2018, Cleveland was placed on waivers by the Hawks.

On July 23, 2018, the Chicago Bulls claimed Cleveland off waivers. He was waived by the Bulls on October 12, 2018. He re-joined the Santa Cruz Warriors for the 2018–19 season.

=== Return to Dallas (2019–2020) ===
On July 25, 2019, Cleveland re-signed with the Dallas Mavericks on a two-way contract with the Texas Legends. He averaged 14.4 points and 7.3 rebounds for the G League Legends.

=== Oklahoma City Blue (2021) ===
On December 3, 2020, Cleveland signed with the Oklahoma City Thunder, but was waived the same day. He then joined the Thunder's G League affiliate, the Oklahoma City Blue.

=== Illawarra Hawks (2021–2022) ===
On August 2, 2021, Cleveland signed with the Illawarra Hawks in Australia for the 2021–22 NBL season. He was named the NBL Best Defensive Player.

=== Adelaide 36ers and Hapoel Eilat (2022–2023) ===
On June 9, 2022, Cleveland signed a two-year deal with the Adelaide 36ers. He earned a second consecutive NBL Best Defensive Player Award for the 2022–23 season. He parted ways with the 36ers after one season.

On February 8, 2023, Cleveland signed a short-term deal with Hapoel Eilat of the Israeli Basketball Premier League, with an eye to returning to the NBL in 2024.

=== Maccabi Tel Aviv (2023–2024) ===
On July 27, 2023, Cleveland signed a two-year deal with Maccabi Tel Aviv of the Israeli Basketball Premier League. He averaged 5.4 points and 1.7 rebounds per game during the 2023–24 season. On July 18, 2024, Maccabi Tel Aviv announced that Cleveland would not be returning for the 2024–25 season.

== Career statistics ==
Legend
GP	Games played	GS	Games started	MPG	Minutes per game
FG%	Field goal percentage	3P%	3-point field goal percentage	FT%	Free throw percentage
RPG	Rebounds per game	APG	Assists per game	SPG	Steals per game
BPG	Blocks per game	PPG	Points per game	**Bold**	Career high

=== NBA ===
==== Regular season ====
Year	Team	GP	GS	MPG	FG%	3P%	FT%	RPG	APG	SPG	BPG	PPG
2017–18	Dallas	**13**	0	6.2	.286	.000	.500	.8	**.2**	**.5**	**.3**	0.8
2017–18	Atlanta	4	0	**10.5**	**.571**	**1.000**	**1.000**	**1.0**	—	.3	**.3**	**3.3**
2019–20	Dallas	11	0	4.2	.286	.000	.600	.6	.1	.1	**.3**	1.0
Career		28	0	6.0	.343	.429	.636	.8	.1	.3	.3	1.2

==== Playoffs ====
Year	Team	GP	GS	MPG	FG%	3P%	FT%	RPG	APG	SPG	BPG	PPG
2020	Dallas	2	0	4.5	.400	—	—	.5	—	.5	—	2.0
Career		2	0	4.5	.400	—	—	.5	—	.5	—	2.0

=== EuroLeague ===
Year	Team	GP	GS	MPG	FG%	3P%	FT%	RPG	APG	SPG	BPG	PPG	PIR
2023–24	Maccabi Tel Aviv	39	4	14.2	.455	.271	.705	1.7	.7	.9	.5	5.4	4.5
Career		39	4	14.2	.455	.271	.705	1.7	.7	.9	.5	5.4	4.5

=== Domestic leagues ===
Year	Team	League	GP	MPG	FG%	3P%	FT%	RPG	APG	SPG	BPG	PPG
2017–18	(United States) Santa Cruz Warriors	G League	6	25.9	.600	.545	.895	3.7	2.2	1.5	.3	13.8
2017–18	(United States) Texas Legends	G League	1	31.2	.357	.000	.500	2.0	2.0	3.0	—	12.0
2018–19	(United States) Santa Cruz Warriors	G League	42	26.5	.459	.360	.709	5.0	2.0	1.6	.7	11.2
2019–20	(United States) Texas Legends	G League	36	30.9	.494	.295	.608	7.3	2.2	1.6	.9	14.4
2020–21	(United States) Oklahoma City Blue	G League	15	28.6	.483	.380	.793	5.5	3.1	1.3	.7	15.1
2021–22	(Australia) Illawarra Hawks	NBL	30	29.4	.471	.217	.722	6.4	2.1	1.8	1.1	14.2
2022–23	(Australia) Adelaide 36ers	NBL	28	28.5	.487	.361	.673	5.2	2.7	1.9	.7	15.8
2022–23	(Israel) Hapoel Eilat	Ligat HaAl	11	29.6	.540	.407	.729	4.2	2.8	1.8	.7	17.6
2023–24	(Israel) Maccabi Tel Aviv	Ligat HaAl	21	20.0	.568	.400	.727	4.0	1.6	1.5	.5	9.0

=== College ===
Year	Team	GP	GS	MPG	FG%	3P%	FT%	RPG	APG	SPG	BPG	PPG
2013–14	Southeast Missouri State	32	21	22.3	.525	.359	.596	2.8	1.7	1.0	.5	9.1
2014–15	Southeast Missouri State	30	30	29.0	.472	.211	.568	4.8	1.8	1.3	.5	10.8
2015–16	Southeast Missouri State	26	24	31.4	.437	.174	.610	**6.6**	**2.3**	**1.6**	.6	15.2
2016–17	Southeast Missouri State	**33**	**33**	**32.9**	**.543**	**.384**	**.660**	5.1	2.2	1.4	**.9**	**16.6**
Career		121	108	28.8	.494	.288	.612	4.7	2.0	1.3	.6	12.9
