= D. J. Hogg =

American basketball player

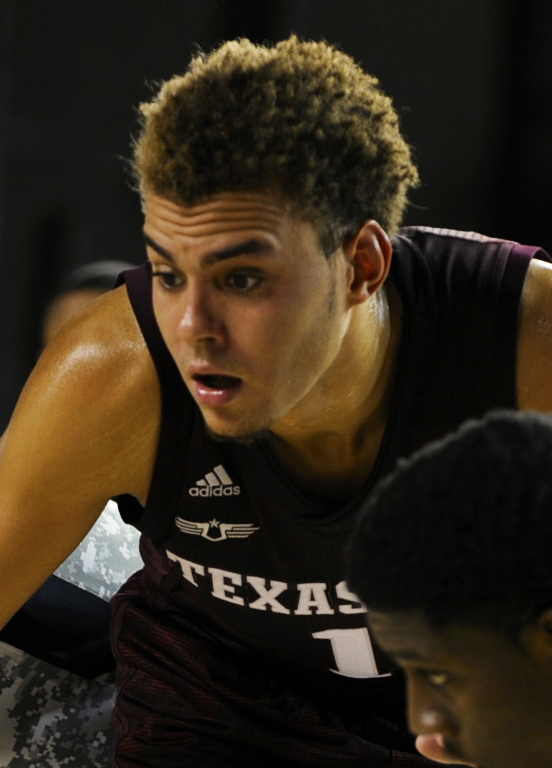
- Hogg with the Texas A&M Aggies in 2017

No. 1 – Alvark Tokyo
- Position: Small forward / power forward
- League: B.League

Personal information
- Born: September 3, 1996 (age 30) Columbus, Ohio, U.S.
- Listed height: 2.07 m (6 ft 9 in)
- Listed weight: 108 kg (238 lb)

Career information
- High school: Plano West (Plano, Texas)
- College: Texas A&M (2015–2018)
- NBA draft: 2018: undrafted
- Playing career: 2018–present

Career history
- 2018–2019: Delaware Blue Coats
- 2019–2020: Wisconsin Herd
- 2021: Lakeland Magic
- 2021–2022: Cholet Basket
- 2022–2023: Cairns Taipans
- 2023–2024: Sydney Kings
- 2024–2026: Chiba Jets
- 2026–present: Alvark Tokyo

Career highlights
- NBA G League champion (2021); All-NBL Second Team (2023)
- Stats at Basketball Reference

Dennis Edward "D. J." Hogg Jr. (born September 3, 1996) is an American professional basketball player for Alvark Tokyo of the Japanese B.League. He played college basketball for the Texas A&M Aggies.

== High school career ==
Hogg starred at Plano West High School and led the Wolves to a Class 6A state title. He hit the game-winning jumper at the buzzer to win the championship against Houston Clear Lake. Hogg was a former top-50 recruit who committed to Texas A&M alongside high school teammate Tyler Davis.

== College career ==
The Aggies reached the Sweet 16 in his freshman season, and Hogg averaged 6.2 points and 2.9 assists per game. As a sophomore, Hogg averaged 12.0 points, 5.1 rebounds and 3.4 assists per game. He was declared out for the season in February 2017 due to a foot injury he suffered in a January 21 game against Georgia. In the Aggies' home opener on November 16, Hogg contributed 24 points, six rebounds, three assists and two blocks in a comfortable win versus UC Santa Barbara. On December 21, Hogg was suspended for three games due to an undisclosed violation of team rules. He led the Aggies to a surprise win over North Carolina in the second round of the 2018 NCAA tournament. He scored 14 points on 5-of-11 shooting, including 3-of-7 from behind the three-point line in the win. He averaged 11.1 points, 5.3 rebounds and 2.6 assists per game as a junior. On April 9, 2018, Hogg decided to forgo his senior year at Texas A&M and enter the 2018 NBA draft.

== Professional career ==
After going undrafted in the 2018 NBA draft, Hogg played for the New Orleans Pelicans in the 2018 NBA Summer League. He signed with the Philadelphia 76ers on October 10, and was then waived two days later. He subsequently joined the Delaware Blue Coats of the NBA G League for the 2018–19 season.

Hogg played for the Wisconsin Herd of the G League during the 2019–20 season after his rights were traded in September 2019.

Hogg played for the Lakeland Magic during the G League hub season between February and March 2021. He averaged 9.2 points, 4.6 rebounds, and 1.5 assists per game.

In August 2021, Hogg played for the Orlando Magic during the 2021 NBA Summer League. He then joined Cholet Basket in France for the 2021–22 Pro A season.

On July 12, 2022, Hogg signed with the Cairns Taipans in Australia for the 2022–23 NBL season.

On May 26, 2023, Hogg signed with the Sydney Kings for the 2023–24 NBL season. He missed the first four rounds of the season due to a shoulder injury. He later missed all of January 2024 with another shoulder injury.

On July 9, 2024, Hogg signed with the Chiba Jets of the Japanese B.League for the 2024–25 season.

On May 29, 2025, Hogg re-signed with the Jets for the 2025–26 season.
