= Keanu Pinder =

Australian basketball player

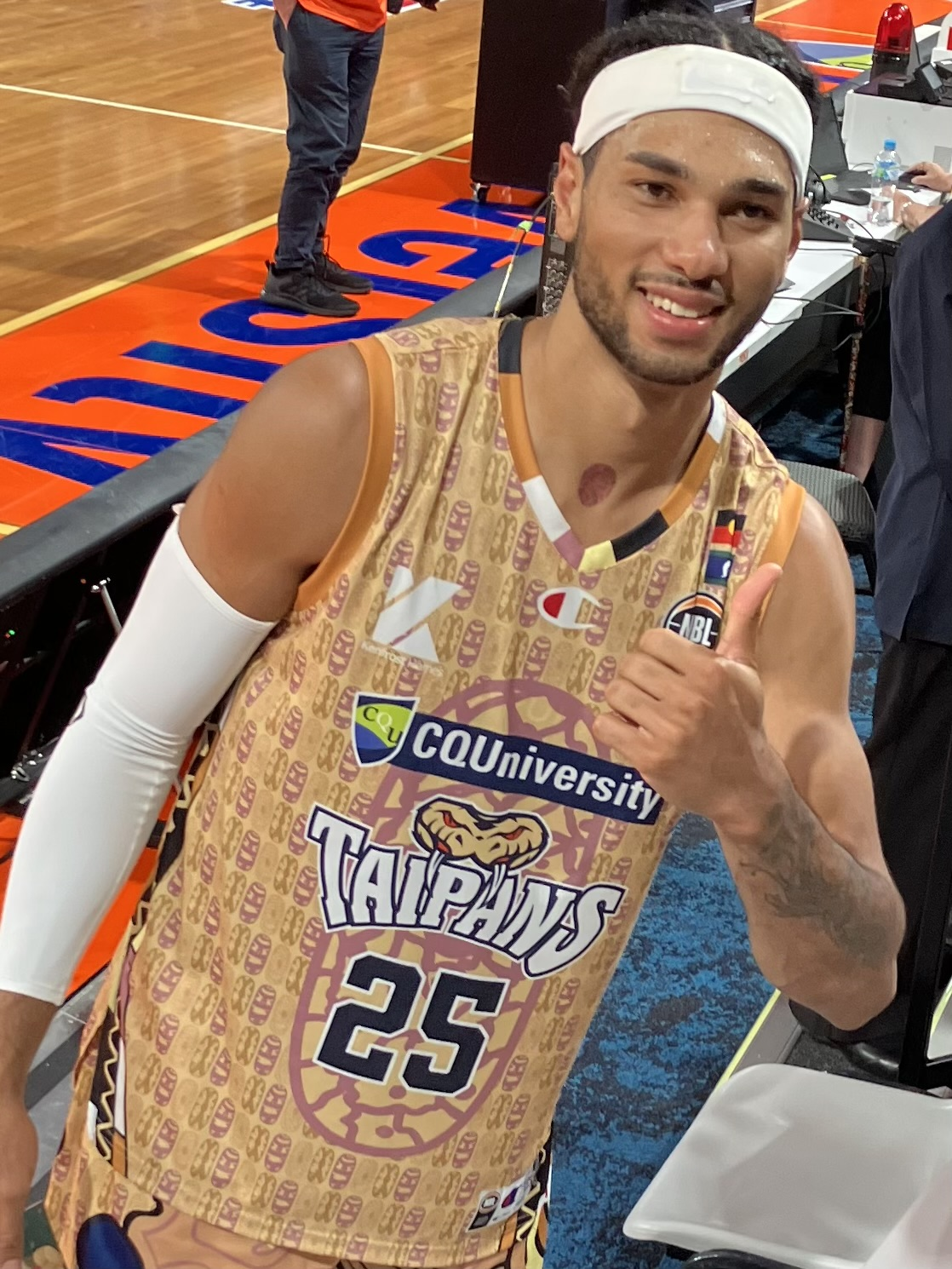
- Pinder with the Cairns Taipans in 2022

No. 25 – Cairns Taipans
- Position: Power forward / center
- League: NBL

Personal information
- Born: 28 May 1995 (age 31) Derby, Western Australia, Australia
- Listed height: 210 cm (6 ft 11 in)
- Listed weight: 103 kg (227 lb)

Career information
- High school: Chisholm Catholic College (Perth, Western Australia); Sunrise Christian Academy (Wichita, Kansas)
- College: Hutchinson CC (2014–2016); Arizona (2016–2018)
- NBA draft: 2018: undrafted
- Playing career: 2013–present

Career history
- 2013: Lakeside Lightning
- 2015: East Perth Eagles
- 2018–2020: Legia Warszawa
- 2020–2021: Adelaide 36ers
- 2021–2023: Cairns Taipans
- 2022: Northside Wizards
- 2023: Fuenlabrada
- 2023–2025: Perth Wildcats
- 2025: Shanxi Loongs
- 2025–2026: Akita Northern Happinets
- 2026–present: Cairns Taipans

Career highlights
- All-NBL Second Team (2023); 2× NBL Most Improved Player (2022, 2023); SBL champion (2013); KJCCC D1 champion (2016); KJCCC D1 Co-Defensive Player of the Year (2016); Second-team All-KJCCC D1 (2016)
Medals
Men's basketball
Representing Australia
FIBA Asia Cup
Gold medal – first place	2022 Jakarta

Keanu Tecumseh Pinder (born 28 May 1995) is an Australian professional basketball player for the Cairns Taipans of the National Basketball League (NBL). He played college basketball for Hutchinson Community College and the Arizona Wildcats.

== Early life and career ==
Pinder was born in Derby, Western Australia. He grew up in Derby before moving to Perth at age 10 for school. As a youth, he played both basketball and Australian rules football. He attended Chisholm Catholic College in Bedford.

During the 2012–13 season, Pinder was a part of the training squad and academy of the Perth Wildcats. He was then a member of the Lakeside Lightning of the State Basketball League (SBL) when they won the SBL championship in the 2013 season. He had a short stint with the East Perth Eagles during the 2015 SBL season.

In 2013, Pinder moved to the United States to spend a prep season attending and playing for Sunrise Christian Academy in Wichita, Kansas.

== College career ==
Between 2014 and 2016, Pinder played college basketball for Hutchinson Community College. He averaged 6.5 points and 6.5 rebounds as a freshman in 2014–15 and then 10.2 points, 6.9 rebounds and 1.8 blocks as a sophomore in 2015–16.

In March 2016, Pinder transferred to the University of Arizona.

As a junior with the Wildcats in 2016–17, Pinder appeared in 35 games and averaged 2.2 points and 2.9 rebounds in 12.0 minutes per game.

As a senior in 2017–18, Pinder averaged 2.3 points and 2.1 rebounds in 10.4 minutes per game.

== Professional career ==
In August 2018, Pinder signed with Legia Warszawa of the Polish Basketball League. He averaged 7.2 points and 4.0 rebounds in 2018–19 and 7.1 points, 5.7 rebounds, and 1.3 assists per game in 2019–20.

On 17 July 2020, Pinder signed with the Adelaide 36ers for the 2020–21 NBL season. He averaged 4.8 points and 4.3 rebounds in 35 games in his first NBL season.

On 19 July 2021, Pinder signed a two-year deal with the Cairns Taipans. He averaged 10.9 points and 7.6 rebounds in 28 games during the 2021–22 season, as he won the NBL Most Improved Player Award. In the 2022 off-season, he played for the Northside Wizards of the NBL1 North. In 2022–23, he averaged 16.9 points and 9.3 rebounds in 19 games before injury cut his season short. He dealt with an ankle injury and then an orbital eye fracture which forced him to watch from the sidelines during finals. He was named NBL Most Improved Player for the second straight year, becoming the first player in league history to win the award twice.

On 3 March 2023, Pinder signed with Fuenlabrada of the Liga ACB. He wore a protective mask for his face injury while playing in Spain.

On 1 April 2023, Pinder signed a two-year deal with the Perth Wildcats. He joined the Phoenix Suns for the 2023 NBA Summer League, but injured his back at practice and did not play. In the 2023–24 NBL season, he averaged 13.6 points, 6.6 rebounds, 1.9 assists and 1.7 steals per game.

On 25 October 2024, Pinder scored an equal career-high 34 points in an 87–84 win over the Sydney Kings. On 11 February 2025, in the Wildcats' NBL Seeding Qualifier, Pinder had a career-high 35 points, 11 rebounds and two blocks in a 122–105 win over the South East Melbourne Phoenix.

On 15 March 2025, Pinder signed with the Shanxi Loongs of the Chinese Basketball Association (CBA) for the rest of the 2024–25 season, replacing Ibrahima Fall Faye.

On 19 June 2025, Pinder signed with the Akita Northern Happinets of the Japanese B.League for the 2025–26 season. His contract was terminated on 1 May 2026, after he sustained a rib injury during the playoffs.

On 30 June 2026, Pinder signed a one-year deal with the Cairns Taipans, returning to the club for a second stint.

== National team career ==
Pinder represented Australia for the first time at the 2013 FIBA Under-19 World Championship in the Czech Republic.

In 2015, Pinder played for the Australian University National Team at the World University Games in South Korea.

In 2022, Pinder won gold with the Boomers at the FIBA Asia Cup in Indonesia.

Pinder was not selected by the Boomers for the 2023 FIBA World Cup after injuring his groin during training camp.

In November 2025, Pinder was named in the Boomers squad for the first window of the FIBA Basketball World Cup 2027 Asian Qualifiers. In June 2026, he was named in the squad for two more Asian qualifiers in Perth in July.

== Personal life ==
Pinder's mother, Tracey Smith, is an Indigenous Australian. She was born in Kalbarri, Western Australia, but lived most of her life in the Kimberley region. His Bahamian father, Kendal Pinder, played professionally for the Perth Wildcats in the National Basketball League.
