= Deng Deng =

South Sudanese-Australian basketball player

Al Ittihad Tripoli
- Position: Power forward
- League: Libyan Division I Basketball League

Personal information
- Born: 5 January 1992 (age 34) Sudan
- Listed height: 203 cm (6 ft 8 in)
- Listed weight: 100 kg (220 lb)

Career information
- High school: Box Hill (Melbourne, Victoria)
- College: Lee College (2012–2014); Baylor (2014–2015)
- NBA draft: 2016: undrafted
- Playing career: 2016–present

Career history
- 2016: Texas Legends
- 2017: Al Shamal Doha
- 2017: Tadamon Zouk
- 2017: Korihait
- 2018: Louaize
- 2018: McKinnon Cougars
- 2018–2019: Sydney Kings
- 2019: MKS Dąbrowa Górnicza
- 2020–2021: Illawarra Hawks
- 2021–2022: Kilsyth Cobras
- 2021–2022: Brisbane Bullets
- 2022–2023: Illawarra Hawks
- 2023–2024: Ipswich Force
- 2023–2024: Ohud Medina
- 2024–2025: Al Ahli Tripoli
- 2025: Al Ittihad Alexandria
- 2025: Beirut Club
- 2025–2026: Dar City
- 2026: ASC Ville de Dakar
- 2026: Mount Gambier Pioneers
- 2026–present: Al Ittihad Tripoli

Career highlights
- NBL1 North champion (2023)

Deng Angok Yak Deng (born 5 January 1992) is a South Sudanese-Australian professional basketball player for Al Ittihad Tripoli of the Libyan Division I Basketball League. He also plays for the South Sudan national team.

Deng played three seasons of college basketball in the United States, two with Lee College and one with Baylor. He has played professionally in the NBA Development League, Qatar, Lebanon, Finland, Poland and Australia. He debuted in the National Basketball League (NBL) in 2018 with the Sydney Kings. He played for the Illawarra Hawks in 2020–21, then the Brisbane Bullets in 2021–22, and then returned to the Hawks in 2022–23.

== Early life ==
Deng was born in Sudan. He moved to Egypt at age four and then Australia at age nine. He is of South Sudanese descent. He attended Box Hill Senior Secondary College in Melbourne, Victoria.

== College career ==
In 2012, Deng moved to the United States to attend Lee College. As freshman in 2012–13, he helped Lee to the school's first ever NJCAA Region 14 championship and qualified for the National Championship tournament with a 25–11 record. He was selected to the Region 14 All-Tournament team. As a sophomore in 2013–14, he averaged 19.8 points, 11.0 rebounds and 3.5 assists per game. He led Lee to a 20–12 record, earning NJCAA second-team All-Region 14 and first-team All-South Zone honours. He scored in double figures in 27 of 28 games before suffering an injury on 26 February.

In May 2014, Deng signed a National Letter of Intent to play for the Baylor Bears. As a junior in 2014–15, he played 23 games for Baylor and averaged 2.9 points and 2.0 rebounds in 8.8 minutes.

In August 2015, Deng was ruled ineligible to play college basketball in 2015–16 due to his age. Despite his ineligibility, Baylor still honoured his scholarship so that he could complete his graduation requirements.

== Professional career ==
On 25 February 2016, Deng was acquired by the Texas Legends of the NBA Development League. In 16 games to finish the 2015–16 season, he averaged 2.7 points and 4.0 rebounds per game.

In October 2016, Deng re-joined the Texas Legends. He left after appearing in three games to start the 2016–17 season. In February 2017, he played five games in Qatar for Al Shamal Doha. The following month, he played four games in Lebanon for Tadamon Zouk.

For the 2017–18 season, Deng moved to Finland to play for Korihait. He played eight games between 26 September and 27 October. In March 2018, he returned to Lebanon and played seven games for Louaize.

In May 2018, Deng returned to Melbourne and joined the McKinnon Cougars for the rest of the Big V season. In 11 games, he averaged 16.3 points, 10.6 rebounds, 2.0 assists, 1.5 steals and 2.5 blocks per game.

Following the Big V season, Deng joined the Sydney Kings for the 2018–19 NBL season. In 19 games for the Kings, he averaged 2.2 points per game. On 22 March 2019, he signed with Polish team MKS Dąbrowa Górnicza. In 10 games to finish the PLK season, he averaged 12.5 points, 7.2 rebounds and 1.2 assists per game.

In October 2019, Deng joined the New Zealand Breakers as an injury replacement for Rob Loe. He did not play in a game during the 2019–20 NBL season.

On 16 July 2020, Deng signed with the Illawarra Hawks for the 2020–21 NBL season. In 39 games, he averaged 6.4 points and 3.8 rebounds per game. He then played for the Kilsyth Cobras of the NBL1 South during the 2021 NBL1 season.

On 10 July 2021, Deng signed with the Brisbane Bullets for the 2021–22 NBL season. He then returned to the Cobras for the 2022 NBL1 South season.

On 1 June 2022, Deng signed with the Illawarra Hawks for the 2022–23 NBL season, returning to the team for a second stint.

In the 2023 NBL1 season, Deng helped the Ipswich Force reach the NBL1 North grand final series, where they defeated the Gold Coast Rollers 2–1 to win the championship behind Deng's 41 points and 13 rebounds in game three.

Deng joined Ohud Medina of the Saudi Premier League for the 2023–24 season, where he averaged 17.7 points, 9.4 rebounds, 2.1 assists, 1.1 steals and 1.1 blocks in 18 games. He then re-joined the Ipswich Force for the 2024 NBL1 North season.

In October 2024, Deng joined Al Ahli Tripoli of the Libyan Division I Basketball League. In five BAL qualifying games, he averaged 19.2 points, 10.2 rebounds, 2.8 assists and 1.0 steals per game.

In February 2025, Deng signed with Al Ittihad Alexandria of the Egyptian Super League. He joined the team for the 2025 BAL season.

In April 2025, Deng joined Beirut Club of the Lebanese Basketball League.

Deng joined Dar City of the Tanzanian NBL for the 2025–26 season. For the 2026 BAL season, he joined Senegalese club ASC Ville de Dakar. In June 2026, he joined the Mount Gambier Pioneers for the rest of the 2026 NBL1 South season.

In November 2026, Deng joined Al Ittihad Tripoli of the Libyan Division I Basketball League.

== National team career ==
In July 2015, Deng played for the Australian University National Team at the World University Games in South Korea. In seven games, he averaged 4.6 points and 2.1 rebounds per game.

In February 2023, Deng played for the South Sudan national team, and helped the country qualify for their first-ever World Cup after sealing their spot in the last qualifying round.
