= Rayjon Tucker =

American basketball player (born 1997)

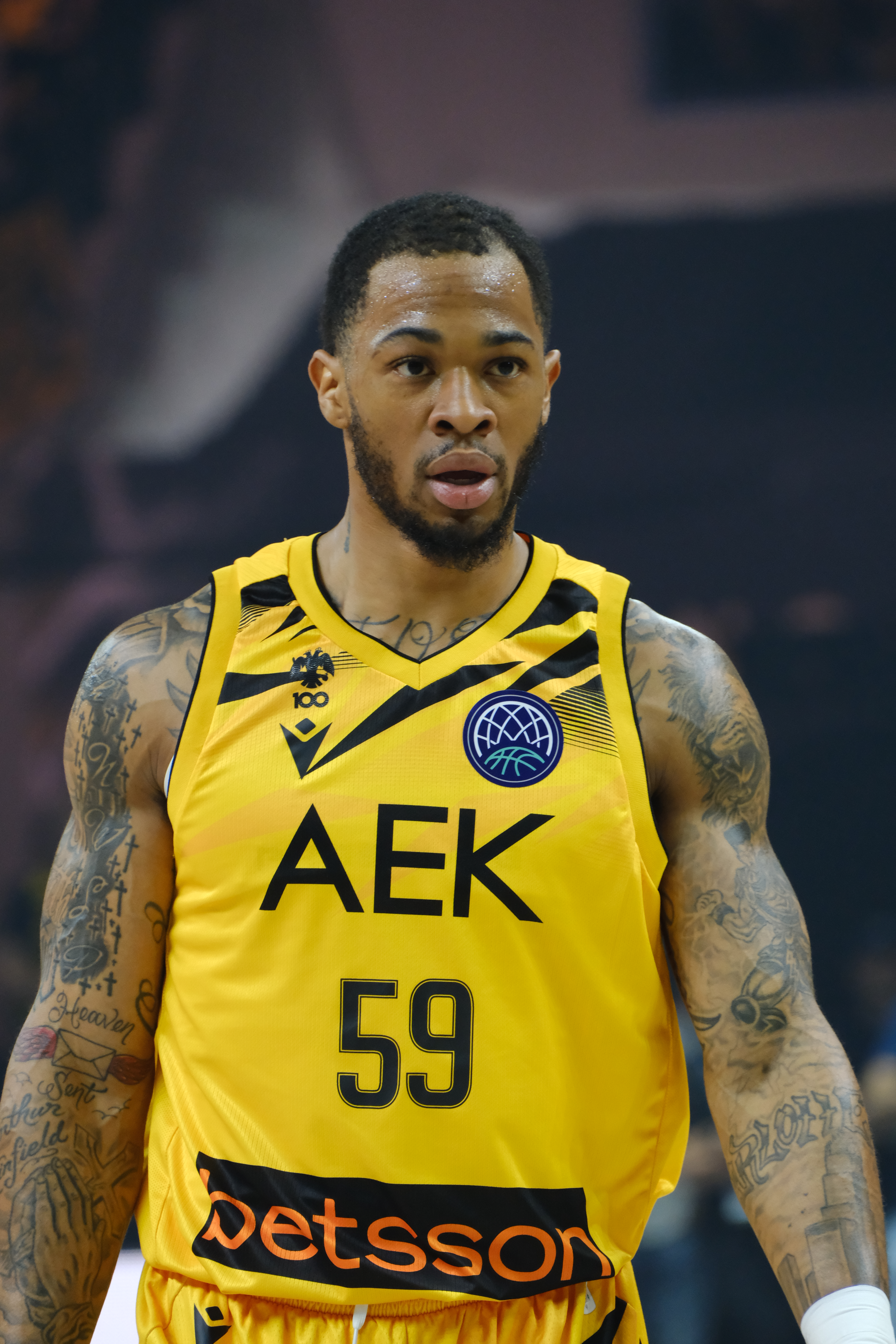
- Tucker with AEK Athens in 2025

No. 59 – Zhejiang Lions
- Position: Shooting guard
- League: CBA

Personal information
- Born: September 24, 1997 (age 29) Charlotte, North Carolina, U.S.
- Listed height: 6 ft 4 in (1.93 m)
- Listed weight: 209 lb (95 kg)

Career information
- High school: Northside Christian Academy (Charlotte, North Carolina)
- College: Florida Gulf Coast (2015–2017); Little Rock (2018–2019)
- NBA draft: 2019: undrafted
- Playing career: 2019–present

Career history
- 2019: Wisconsin Herd
- 2019–2020: Utah Jazz
- 2020: →Salt Lake City Stars
- 2021: Philadelphia 76ers
- 2021: →Delaware Blue Coats
- 2021–2022: Wisconsin Herd
- 2022: Denver Nuggets
- 2022: Milwaukee Bucks
- 2022–2023: Melbourne United
- 2023–2024: Venezia
- 2024–2025: Virtus Bologna
- 2025: AEK Athens
- 2025: Vaqueros de Bayamón
- 2025–present: Zhejiang Lions

Career highlights
- BSN champion (2025); All-LBA Team (2024); Second-team All-Sun Belt (2019)
- Stats at NBA.com
- Stats at Basketball Reference

Rayjon Tucker (born September 24, 1997) is an American professional basketball player for Zhejiang Lions of the Chinese Basketball Association (CBA). He played college basketball for the Florida Gulf Coast Eagles and the Little Rock Trojans.

== Early life and high school ==
Tucker grew up in Charlotte, North Carolina and attended Northside Christian Academy. As a senior, he averaged 24 points, 10 rebounds, 5 assists, 3 steals and 3 blocks per game and helped lead Knights to the state championship game. Tucker committed to play college basketball at Florida Gulf Coast over offers from Virginia Tech, Boston College, VCU, Clemson, and Auburn.

== College career ==
Tucker began his collegiate career with the Florida Gulf Coast Eagles. As a freshman, he averaged 6.2 points and 3.1 rebounds per game in 35 games played, starting one. Tucker averaged 7.7 points and 2.9 rebounds in 18.8 minutes per game as a sophomore. He announced his intention to transfer from the school at the end of the season.

Tucker transferred to the University of Arkansas-Little Rock. After sitting out a season due to NCAA transfer rules, he averaged 20.3 points and 6.7 rebounds per game and was named second team All-Sun Belt Conference. Following the season, Tucker left the program with the intention of joining a higher-level program as a graduate transfer while also declaring for the 2019 NBA draft. He committed to transfer to Memphis over offers from Auburn, West Virginia, Kansas and Iowa State. However, Tucker ultimately decided not to pull out of the Draft and to pursue professional basketball instead.

== Professional career ==
=== Wisconsin Herd (2019) ===
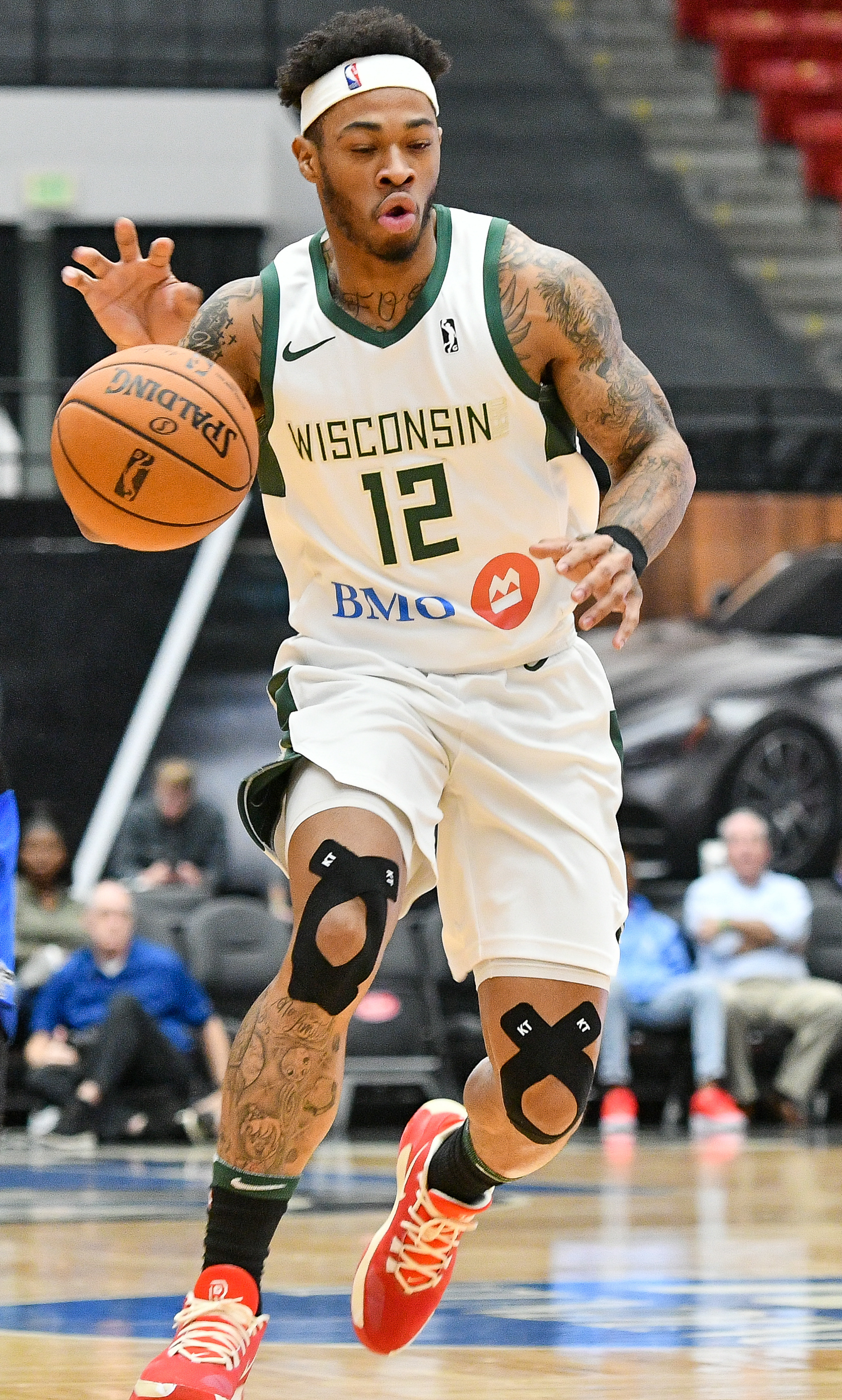
Tucker with the Wisconsin Herd in 2019

After going undrafted in the 2019 NBA draft, Tucker played for the Milwaukee Bucks NBA Summer League team. After averaging 10.2 points and 3.6 rebounds in five summer league games, the Bucks signed Tucker to an Exhibit 10 contract on August 16, 2019. Tucker was waived by the Bucks on October 19, 2019, and was subsequently assigned to their NBA G League affiliate, the Wisconsin Herd. He was considered an excellent teammate who once grabbed water for the players in a game he did not play in. Tucker averaged 23.8 points, 4.6 rebounds, 2.8 assists, and 0.9 steals per game in 33.8 minutes played in 16 games with the Herd before signing an NBA contract with the Jazz. Tucker was named the G League Player of the Month for December and Midseason All-NBA G League for the Eastern Conference.

=== Utah Jazz (2019–2020) ===
On December 24, 2019, Tucker signed with the Utah Jazz for the rest of the 2019–20 NBA season. He made his NBA debut six days later, against the Detroit Pistons, scoring two points and grabbing a rebound in a 104–81 win. He began to see rotational minutes in January 2020 due to his focus on defense. He was twice assigned to the Salt Lake City Stars of the NBA G League, once in February and once in March.

On November 27, 2020, Tucker was traded to the Cleveland Cavaliers along with a 2027 second-round pick in exchange for cash considerations. He was waived by the Cavaliers the next day.

Tucker spent training camp and preseason with the Los Angeles Clippers in December 2020.

=== Philadelphia 76ers (2021) ===
On January 22, 2021, Tucker signed a two-way contract with the Philadelphia 76ers. He split the 2020–21 season with the 76ers and their NBA G League affiliate, the Delaware Blue Coats. He was waived by the 76ers on August 18, 2021.

=== Return to Wisconsin / Denver Nuggets (2021–2022) ===
Tucker joined the Wisconsin Herd for the 2021–22 NBA G League season. On December 21, 2021, he signed a 10-day contract with the Minnesota Timberwolves. After not playing for the Timberwolves during his stint, he signed a 10-day contract with the Denver Nuggets on December 31. He played in three games for the Nuggets. He returned to the Herd on January 11, 2022. On February 3, he scored 31 points and had six rebounds in a loss to the Lakeland Magic. In 27 games for the Heard, he averaged 21.1 points, 7.6 rebounds, 3.8 assists and 1.3 steals per game.

=== Milwaukee Bucks (2022) ===
On April 8, 2022, Tucker signed with the Milwaukee Bucks. He played two games for the Bucks to close out the 2021–22 NBA season and then played for the team in the 2022 NBA Summer League.

=== Melbourne United (2022–2023) ===
On August 2, 2022, Tucker signed with Melbourne United in Australia for the 2022–23 NBL season.

=== Reyer Venezia (2023–2024) ===
On July 16, 2023, Tucker signed with Reyer Venezia in Italy for the 2023–24 LBA season.

=== AEK Athens (2025) ===
On March 29, 2025, he joined AEK Athens of the Greek Basketball League and the Basketball Champions League.

=== Vaqueros de Bayamón (2025) ===
On August 7, 2025, he joined the Vaqueros de Bayamón in Puerto Rico to replace Chris Duarte. He's referred after one game, the best import in the team after a 7-point performance on the final bsn series cited by sports analyst Sulinnette Perez.

== Career statistics ==
Legend
GP	Games played	GS	Games started	MPG	Minutes per game
FG%	Field goal percentage	3P%	3-point field goal percentage	FT%	Free throw percentage
RPG	Rebounds per game	APG	Assists per game	SPG	Steals per game
BPG	Blocks per game	PPG	Points per game	**Bold**	Career high

=== NBA ===
==== Regular season ====
Year	Team	GP	GS	MPG	FG%	3P%	FT%	RPG	APG	SPG	BPG	PPG
2019–20	Utah	**20**	0	8.1	.465	.176	**.826**	1.0	.3	.1	**.1**	3.1
2020–21	Philadelphia	14	0	4.9	.500	.286	.737	.8	.4	.1	.0	2.4
2021–22	Denver	3	0	9.7	.500	.500	.750	1.3	1.3	.3	.0	2.0
2021–22	Milwaukee	2	0	**21.0**	**.714**	**1.000**	.667	**2.0**	**3.0**	**1.5**	.0	**7.5**
Career		39	0	7.7	.500	.310	.776	1.0	.5	.2	.0	3.0

==== Playoffs ====
Year	Team	GP	GS	MPG	FG%	3P%	FT%	RPG	APG	SPG	BPG	PPG
2020	Utah	2	0	**5.5**	**.400**	**.333**	—	.0	.0	.0	.0	**2.5**
2021	Philadelphia	1	0	2.0	—	—	.500	.0	.0	.0	.0	1.0
2022	Milwaukee	**8**	0	2.4	.333	.000	—	**.4**	.0	.0	.0	.3
Career		11	0	2.9	.375	.250	.500	.3	.0	.0	.0	.7

=== College ===
Year	Team	GP	GS	MPG	FG%	3P%	FT%	RPG	APG	SPG	BPG	PPG
2015–16	Florida Gulf Coast	**35**	1	18.5	**.545**	.359	.714	3.0	.8	.6	.2	6.2
2016–17	Florida Gulf Coast	33	6	18.8	.509	**.453**	.753	3.9	1.0	.4	.3	7.7
2018–19	Little Rock	30	**30**	**36.6**	.491	.411	**.777**	**6.7**	**1.8**	**1.1**	**.4**	**20.3**
Career		98	37	24.2	.505	.414	.756	4.1	1.2	.7	.3	11.0
