= Brady Manek =

American basketball player (born 1998)

- Manek with Trabzonspor in 2026

No. 45 – Trabzonspor
- Position: Power forward
- League: Basketbol Süper Ligi; FIBA Champions League

Personal information
- Born: September 4, 1998 (age 28) Edmond, Oklahoma, U.S.
- Listed height: 6 ft 9 in (2.06 m)
- Listed weight: 231 lb (105 kg)

Career information
- High school: Harrah (Harrah, Oklahoma)
- College: Oklahoma (2017–2021); North Carolina (2021–2022)
- NBA draft: 2022: undrafted
- Playing career: 2022–present

Career history
- 2022–2023: Perth Wildcats
- 2023: Tofaş
- 2023–2025: Žalgiris Kaunas
- 2025: →Mersin MSK
- 2025: Leones de Ponce
- 2025–2026: Nanjing Monkey Kings
- 2026: Leones de Ponce
- 2026–present: Trabzonspor

Career highlights
- 2× King Mindaugas Cup winner (2024, 2025); Third-team All-Big 12 (2020)

Brady Reece Manek (born September 4, 1998) is an American professional basketball player for Trabzonspor of the Turkish Basketbol Süper Ligi (BSL) and the FIBA Champions League. He played college basketball for the Oklahoma Sooners and the North Carolina Tar Heels.

== Early life ==
Manek was born and raised in Edmond, Oklahoma and started playing basketball from a young age against older competition. He often played against future college teammate Trae Young while attending elementary school. His family moved to Harrah, Oklahoma, where he began playing varsity basketball for Harrah High School in his freshman season. Between his freshman and sophomore years, Manek greatly improved his dunking ability. He was named Little All-City Player of the Year by The Oklahoman in each of his final two seasons. As a senior, Manek averaged 24.3 points and 11.6 rebounds, leading Harrah to the state quarterfinals. Rated either a three-star and four-star recruit by several services, he committed to play college basketball for Oklahoma after his sophomore season of high school.

== College career ==
=== Oklahoma ===
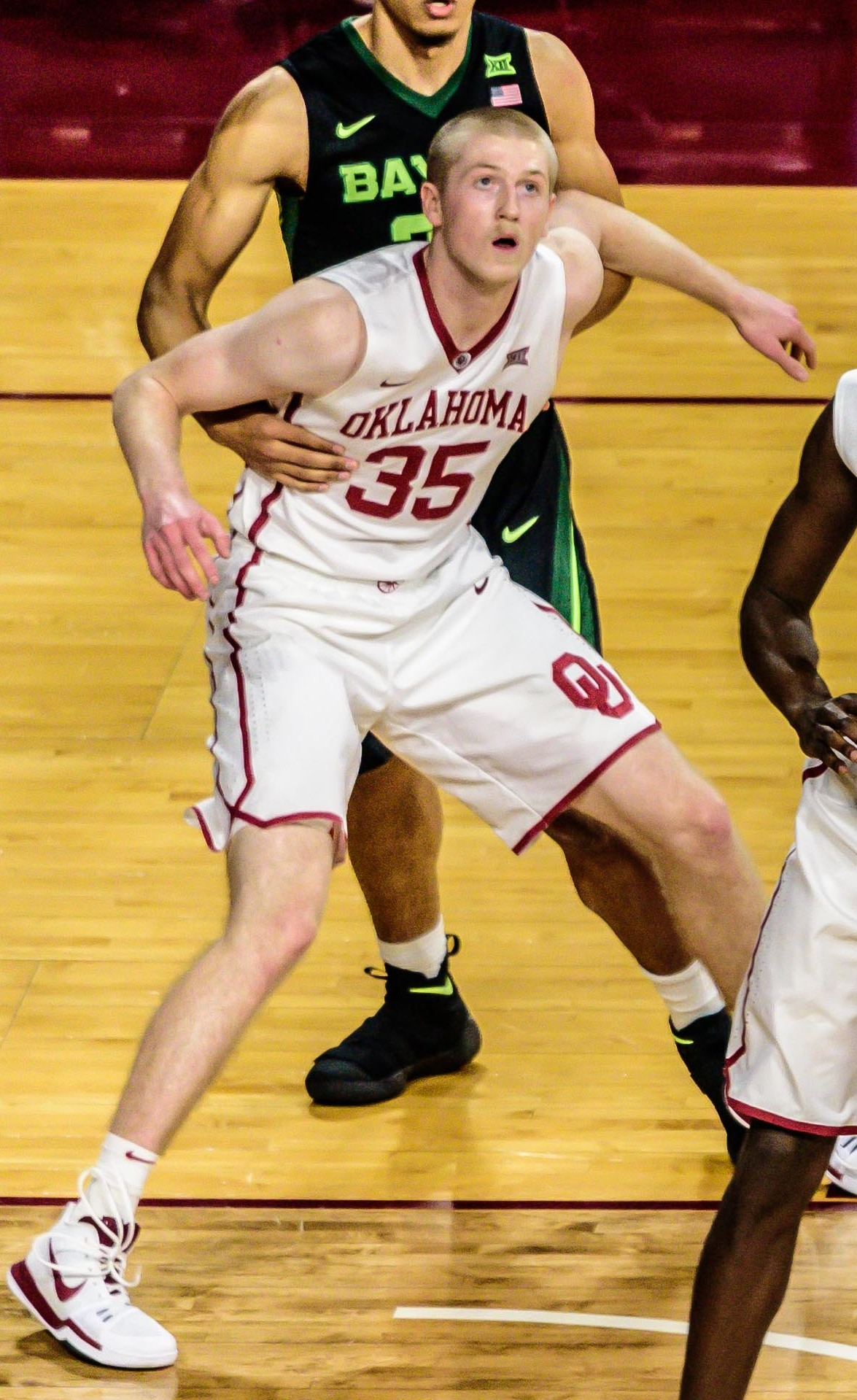
Manek with Oklahoma in 2018

As a freshman at Oklahoma, Manek averaged 10.2 points and 5.2 rebounds per game in 32 appearances. He and Trae Young were the highest scoring freshman duo in the NCAA Division I. Manek recorded 59 three-pointers, the fourth-most by a freshman in school history. In his sophomore season, he made national headlines for his resemblance to Larry Bird. He averaged 12.2 points and 5.9 rebounds per game as a sophomore and was an All-Big 12 Honorable Mention selection. On January 18, 2020, Manek scored a career-high 31 points and seven three-pointers, while reaching 1,000 career points, in an 83–63 win over TCU. Manek scored 30 points on February 1, in an 82–69 victory over Oklahoma State. As a junior, he averaged 14.4 points, 6.2 rebounds and 1.2 blocks per game, earning Third Team All-Big 12 honors. In his senior season, Manek averaged 10.8 points and five rebounds per game. Following the season, he transferred to North Carolina.

=== North Carolina ===
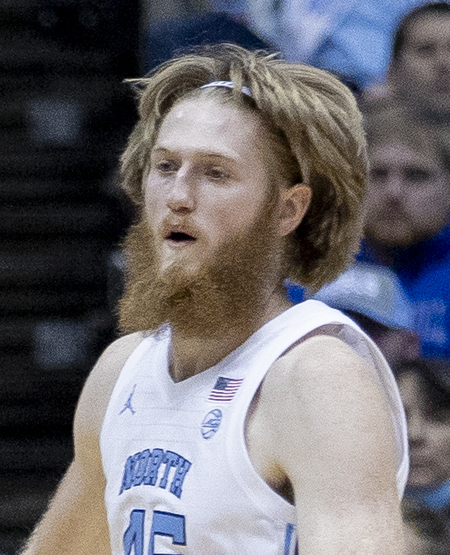
Manek with North Carolina in 2021

After four years at Oklahoma, Manek transferred to North Carolina as a graduate student. He took advantage of the extra year of NCAA eligibility granted in response to the COVID-19 pandemic to play in Chapel Hill. After being used primarily as the sixth man for the first part of the season, Manek was inserted to the starting lineup following an injury to Dawson Garcia. Manek's elevation to the starting five coincided with a turnaround in the Tar Heels' fortunes, as the team was able to play their way to a tie for second place in the ACC regular season standings and the third seed in the conference's tournament. He scored 20 points in the Tar Heels' 94–81 victory in the regular-season finale against Duke. Following the regular season, Manek was named Honorable Mention All-ACC. In the first round of the NCAA tournament against Marquette, Manek scored a season-high 28 points, three shy of his career high. He scored 26 points in just 28 minutes of action against Baylor in the second round of the tournament. Manek was ejected from the game following a flagrant 2 foul on Baylor's Jeremy Sochan. At the time, the Tar Heels held a 25-point lead. Following the ejection, Baylor was able to come back and force overtime, but the Tar Heels held on and advanced to the Sweet 16, 93–86.

On April 1, 2022, Manek was named as the recipient of the Riley Wallace Player of the Year Award, given to the top transfer player in college basketball.

== Professional career ==
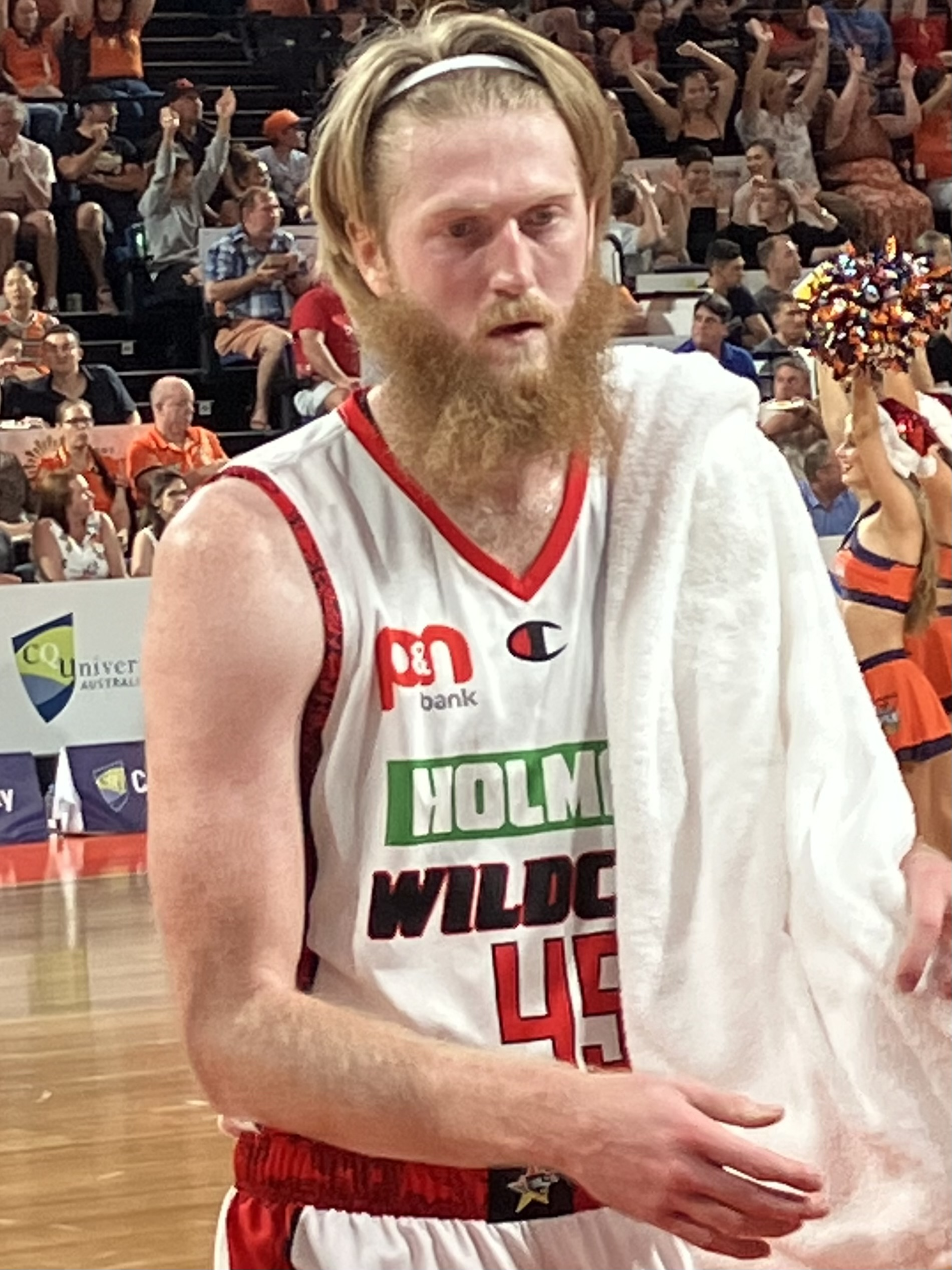
Manek with the Perth Wildcats in 2022

After going undrafted in the 2022 NBA draft, Manek joined the Charlotte Hornets for the 2022 NBA Summer League. On August 1, 2022, he signed with the Perth Wildcats in Australia for the 2022–23 NBL season.

On February 24, 2023, Manek signed with Tofaş of the Basketbol Süper Ligi (BSL).

On July 21, 2023, Manek signed a two-year (1+1) deal with Žalgiris Kaunas of the Lithuanian Basketball League (LKL) and the EuroLeague. In September 2024, Manek suffered an ankle injury during practice which would have him sidelined for a few weeks. Manek fell out of the rotation in his second season, averaging less than nine minutes of action in the EuroLeague. On April 18, 2025, he was loaned to Mersin MSK of the Basketbol Süper Ligi (BSL) for the remainder of the season. On July 11, 2025, he was officially released from the Lithuanian club.

On June 10, 2025, he signed with Leones de Ponce of Baloncesto Superior Nacional, helping the team reach the BSN Finals.

On June 4, 2026, he signed with Trabzonspor of the Basketbol Süper Ligi (BSL).

== Career statistics ==
Legend
GP	Games played	GS	Games started	MPG	Minutes per game
FG%	Field-goal percentage	3P%	3-point field-goal percentage	FT%	Free-throw percentage
RPG	Rebounds per game	APG	Assists per game	SPG	Steals per game
BPG	Blocks per game	PPG	Points per game	PIR	Performance index rating
**Bold**	Career high

=== EuroLeague ===
Year	Team	GP	GS	MPG	FG%	3P%	FT%	RPG	APG	SPG	BPG	PPG	PIR
2023–24	Žalgiris	28	6	18.9	.425	.407	.789	3.4	.6	.6	.1	7.5	6.9
Career		28	6	18.9	.425	.407	.789	3.4	.6	.6	.1	7.5	6.9

=== College ===
Year	Team	GP	GS	MPG	FG%	3P%	FT%	RPG	APG	SPG	BPG	PPG
2017–18	Oklahoma	32	26	23.7	.466	.383	.600	5.2	.5	.3	.7	10.2
2018–19	Oklahoma	34	**34**	27.8	.469	.358	.764	5.9	.8	**.7**	.7	12.2
2019–20	Oklahoma	31	31	**30.5**	.453	.380	**.779**	**6.2**	.9	.5	**1.2**	14.4
2020–21	Oklahoma	25	20	25.1	.422	.375	.767	5.0	.8	.5	.8	10.8
2021–22	North Carolina	**39**	27	30.4	**.493**	**.403**	.697	6.1	**1.8**	.6	.7	**15.1**
Career		161	138	27.7	.465	.382	.733	5.7	1.0	.5	.8	12.7

== Personal life ==
Manek's older brother, Kellen, was his basketball teammate at Harrah High School for three years and played for Oral Roberts and Southeastern Oklahoma State.
