= Dererk Pardon =

American basketball player

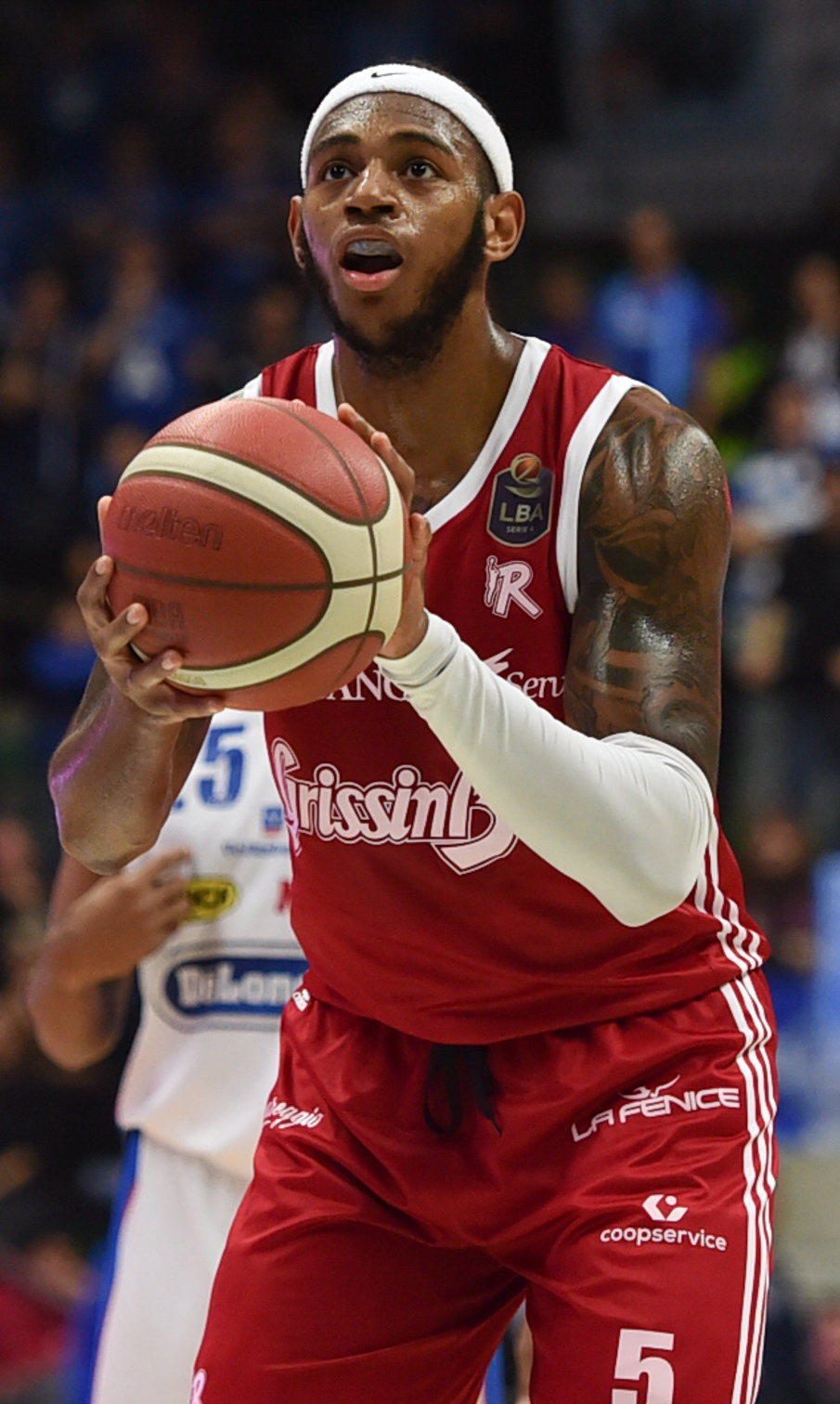
- Pardon with Reggiana in December 2019

No. 7 – Altiri Chiba
- Position: Power forward
- League: B.League

Personal information
- Born: October 1, 1996 (age 30)
- Listed height: 6 ft 8 in (2.03 m)
- Listed weight: 235 lb (107 kg)

Career information
- High school: Villa Angela-St. Joseph (Cleveland, Ohio)
- College: Northwestern (2015–2019)
- Playing career: 2019–present

Career history
- 2019–2020: Reggiana
- 2020–2021: Medi Bayreuth
- 2021–2022: Hapoel Be'er Sheva
- 2022–2023: New Zealand Breakers
- 2023: Cangrejeros de Santurce
- 2023–present: Altiri Chiba

Career highlights
- All-NBL Second Team (2023)

Dererk Pardon (born October 1, 1996) is an American professional basketball player for Altiri Chiba of the B.League. He played college basketball for the Northwestern Wildcats.

== Early life and high school career ==
Pardon did not start playing basketball until seventh grade. As a freshman at Villa Angela-St. Joseph High School in Cleveland, Ohio, he played for the junior varsity team, despite being recruited by the football coach. He moved up to varsity in his sophomore season and won a Division III state title alongside five-star recruit Carlton Bragg Jr., though in a limited role. He averaged 11.5 points and 10.5 rebounds per game as a junior.

As a senior, Pardon averaged 12.3 points and 11 rebounds per game, while recording a school-record 101 blocks, and led his team to a second Division III state championship. In the title game, he posted 15 points, 12 rebounds, and nine blocks. On June 7, 2014, Pardon committed to play college basketball for Northwestern over offers from Xavier and Pittsburgh, among others. He was a three-star recruit.

== College career ==
Pardon initially redshirted his true freshman season at Northwestern. However, he burned his redshirt in December due to a rash of injuries. In his second game with Northwestern, on December 30, 2015, Pardon recorded a career-high 28 points and 12 rebounds in an 81–72 win over Nebraska. In his freshman season, he averaged 6.7 points and 4.2 rebounds per game. On January 26, 2017, in a 73–61 victory over Nebraska, Pardon posted 19 points and a career-high 22 rebounds, the most single-game rebounds by a Northwestern player since Jim Pitts in 1965. On March 1, he made a game-winning layup as time expired from a full-court inbound pass to defeat Michigan, 67–65. The victory helped Northwestern secure its first-ever NCAA tournament berth. As a sophomore, Pardon averaged 8.6 points, eight rebounds and 1.8 blocks per game.

In his junior season, he averaged 11.3 points, 7.1 rebounds and 1.8 blocks per game, with a school-record .619 field goal percentage, and was an honorable mention All-Big Ten Conference selection by the media. On December 1, 2018, Pardon recorded a senior season-high 24 points and 10 rebounds in a 68–66 loss to Indiana. As a senior, he averaged 14 points, 7.8 rebounds and 1.8 assists per game and was an honorable mention All-Big Ten selection by the media and coaches. Pardon finished as Northwestern's all-time leader in career field goal percentage at .603.

== Professional career ==
Pardon played for the Orlando Magic at 2019 NBA Summer League. On July 17, 2019, he signed with Grissin Bon Reggio Emilia of the Lega Basket Serie A (LBA). On December 29, Pardon recorded a season-high 16 points, shooting 6-of-6 from the field, and five rebounds in a 96–88 win over Virtus Roma. On March 1, 2020, it was announced that he would miss about two months of action with a left hand injury suffered in practice. Pardon parted ways with Reggio Emilia two days later to undergo hand surgery in the United States. He finished the season averaging 6.1 points and 5.2 rebounds per game.

On June 30, 2020, Pardon signed with Medi Bayreuth of the Basketball Bundesliga.

On July 4, 2021, Pardon signed with Hapoel Be'er Sheva of the Israeli Premier League.

On June 15, 2022, Pardon signed with the New Zealand Breakers for the 2022–23 NBL season.

On March 21, 2023, he signed with Cangrejeros de Santurce of the Baloncesto Superior Nacional (BSN).

On June 28, 2023, Pardon signed with Altiri Chiba of the Japanese B.League.

== Personal life ==
Pardon is the son of Cynthia and Donald Pardon.
