= Lachlan Dent =

Australian basketball player (born 2000)

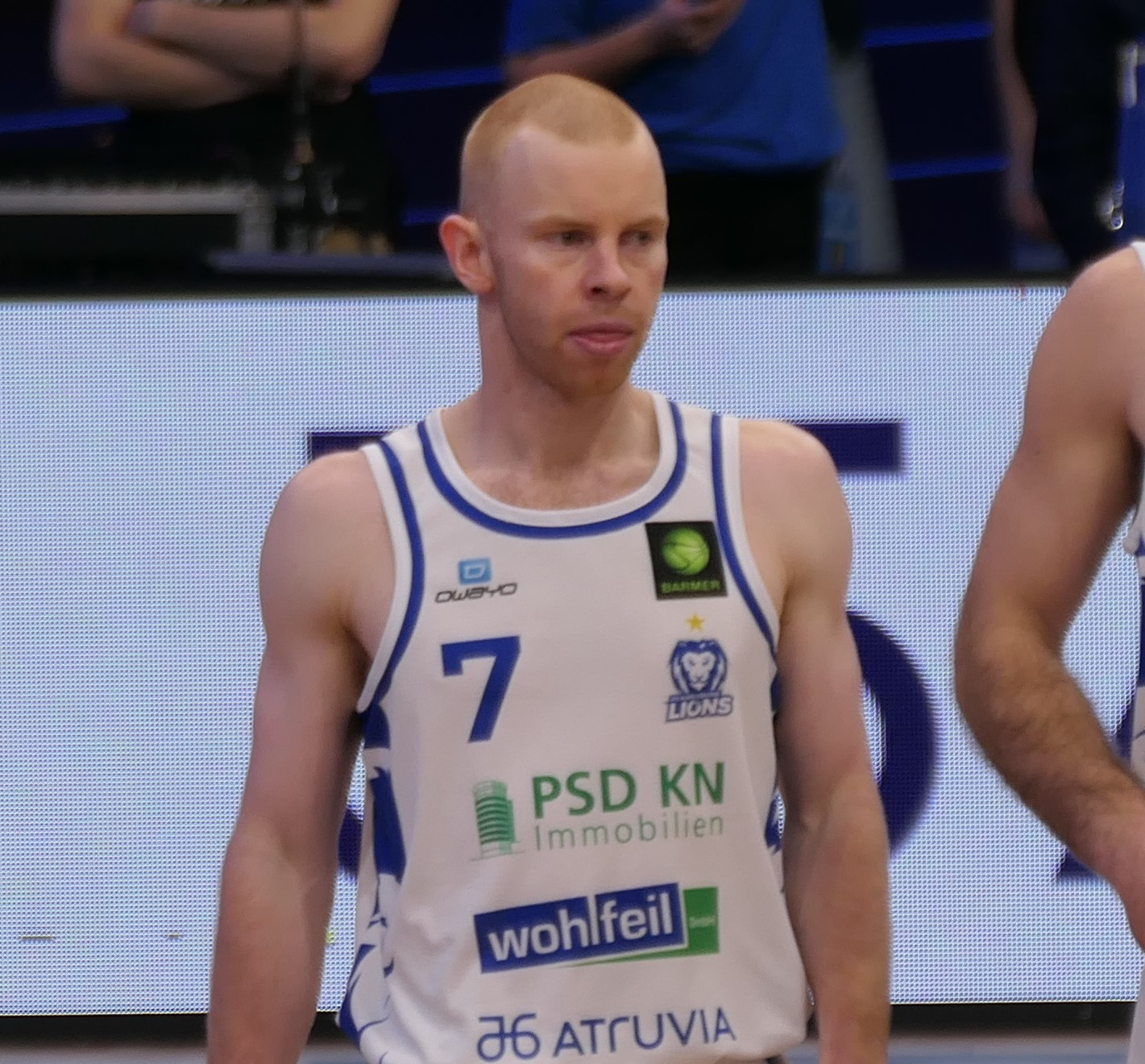
- Dent with Karlsruhe in 2024

Ballarat Miners
- Position: Point guard
- League: NBL1 South

Personal information
- Born: 1 February 2000 (age 26) Campbelltown, New South Wales, Australia
- Listed height: 183 cm (6 ft 0 in)
- Listed weight: 81 kg (179 lb)

Career history
- 2016: BA Centre of Excellence
- 2019–2023: Illawarra Hawks
- 2019: NW Tasmania Thunder
- 2020: Norths Bears
- 2022–2023: Brisbane Capitals
- 2023–2025: PS Karlsruhe Lions
- 2025: Sydney Kings
- 2026–present: Ballarat Miners

Career highlights
- ProA champion (2024)

Lachlan Timothy Dent (born 1 February 2000) is an Australian professional basketball player.

== Early life ==
Dent was born in Campbelltown, New South Wales, before moving to Wollongong at a young age.

== Professional career ==
Dent played for the Illawarra Hawks of the NBL between 2019 and 2023.

Dent moved to Germany and joined the PS Karlsruhe Lions of the ProA for the 2023–24 season. In April 2024, he made Karlsruhe basketball history with ten three-pointers and a total of 42 points against Paderborn Baskets.

On 22 November 2025, Dent signed with the Sydney Kings as short-term injury replacement.

Dent joined the Ballarat Miners of the NBL1 South for the 2026 season.

== Personal life ==
Dent's younger brother, Joshua, plays college basketball for the Saint Mary's Gaels.
