= List of statutes of New Zealand (2008–2017) =

This is a list of statutes of New Zealand for the period of the Fifth National Government of New Zealand (19 November 2008 to 26 October 2017).

== 2008 ==
- Taxation (Urgent Measures and Annual Rates) Act 2008

Amendments

- Bail Amendment Act 2008 (Bail Act 2000)
- Education (National Standards) Amendment Act 2008 (Education Act 1989)
- Electricity (Renewable Preference) Repeal Act 2008 (Electricity Act 1992)
- Employment Relations Amendment Act 2008 (Employment Relations Act 2000)
- Energy (Fuels, Levies, and References) Biofuel Obligation Repeal Act 2008 (Energy (Fuels, Levies, and References) Act 1989)
- Sentencing (Offences Against Children) Amendment Act 2008 (Sentencing Act 2002)

== 2009 ==
- Anti-Money Laundering and Countering Financing of Terrorism Act 2009
- Appropriation (2007/08 Financial Review) Act 2009
- Appropriation (2008/09 Supplementary Estimates) Act 2009
- Appropriation (2009/10 Estimates) Act 2009
- Cluster Munitions Prohibition Act 2009
- Criminal Proceeds (Recovery) Act 2009
- Crown Retail Deposit Guarantee Scheme Act 2009
- Immigration Act 2009
- Imprest Supply (First for 2009/10) Act 2009
- Imprest Supply (Second for 2009/10) Act 2009
- Local Government (Auckland Council) Act 2009
- Local Government (Tamaki Makaurau Reorganisation) Act 2009
- Methodist Church of New Zealand Trusts Act 2009
- Port Nicholson Block (Taranaki Whānui ki Te Upoko o Te Ika) Claims Settlement Act 2009
- Subordinate Legislation (Confirmation and Validation) Act 2009
- Taxation (Budget Tax Measures) Act 2009
- Taxation (Business Tax Measures) Act 2009
- Taxation (Consequential Rate Alignment and Remedial Matters) Act 2009
- Taxation (International Taxation, Life Insurance, and Remedial Matters) Act 2009
- Wanganui District Council (Prohibition of Gang Insignia) Act 2009
- Whakarewarewa and Roto-a-Tamaheke Vesting Act 2009

== 2010 ==
- Appropriation (2008/09 Financial Review) Act 2010
- Appropriation (2009/10 Supplementary Estimates) Act 2010
- Appropriation (2010/11 Estimates) Act 2010
- Canterbury Earthquake Response and Recovery Act 2010
- Courts (Remote Participation) Act 2010
- Electoral Referendum Act 2010
- Electricity Industry Act 2010
- Environment Canterbury (Temporary Commissioners and Improved Water Management) Act 2010
- Governor-General Act 2010
- Insurance (Prudential Supervision) Act 2010
- Limitation Act 2010
- Local Government (Auckland Transitional Provisions) Act 2010
- New Zealand Productivity Commission Act 2010
- Ngāti Apa (North Island) Claims Settlement Act 2010
- Ngati Tuwharetoa, Raukawa, and Te Arawa River Iwi Waikato River Act 2010
- Private Security Personnel and Private Investigators Act 2010
- Research, Science, and Technology Act 2010
- Rugby World Cup 2011 (Empowering) Act 2010
- Sentencing and Parole Reform Act 2010
- Subordinate Legislation (Confirmation and Validation) Act 2010
- Trans-Tasman Proceedings Act 2010
- Unit Titles Act 2010
- Utilities Access Act 2010
- Waikato-Tainui Raupatu Claims (Waikato River) Settlement Act 2010

== 2011 ==
- Appropriation (2009/10 Financial Review) Act 2011
- Appropriation (2010/11 Supplementary Estimates) Act 2011
- Appropriation (2011/12 Estimates) Act 2011
- Auditor Regulation Act 2011
- Canterbury Earthquake Commemoration Day Act 2011
- Canterbury Earthquake Recovery Act 2011
- Criminal Procedure Act 2011
- Duties of Statutory Officers (Census and Other Remedial Provisions) Act 2011
- Environmental Protection Authority Act 2011
- Financial Markets Authority Act 2011
- Freedom Camping Act 2011
- Hamilton City Council (Parana Park) Land Vesting Act 2011
- Imprest Supply (First for 2011/12) Act 2011
- Imprest Supply (Second for 2011/12) Act 2011
- Legal Services Act 2011
- Local Government Borrowing Act 2011
- Māori Purposes Act 2011
- Marine and Coastal Area (Takutai Moana) Act 2011
- Securities Trustees and Statutory Supervisors Act 2011
- Sleepover Wages (Settlement) Act 2011
- Student Loan Scheme Act 2011
- Subordinate Legislation (Confirmation and Validation) Act 2011
- Taxation (Annual Rates and Budget Measures) Act 2011
- Taxation (Canterbury Earthquake Measures) Act 2011
- Taxation (Tax Administration and Remedial Matters) Act 2011
- Video Camera Surveillance (Temporary Measures) Act 2011
- Westpac New Zealand Act 2011
- Whanganui Iwi (Whanganui (Kaitoke) Prison and Northern Part of Whanganui Forest) On-account Settlement Act 2011

Amendments

- Adoption Amendment Act 2011 (Adoption Act 1955)
- Aquaculture Reform (Repeals and Transitional Provisions) Amendment Act 2011 (Aquaculture Reform (Repeals and Transitional Provisions) Act 2004)
- Bail Amendment Act 2011 (Bail Act 2000)
- Care of Children Amendment Act 2011 (Care of Children Act 2004)
- Children, Young Persons, and Their Families Amendment Act 2011 (Children, Young Persons, and Their Families Act 1989)
- Children, Young Persons, and Their Families Amendment Act (No 2) 2011 (Children, Young Persons, and Their Families Act 1989)
- Climate Change Response Amendment Act 2011 (Climate Change Response Act 2002)
- Copyright Amendment Act 2011 (Copyright Act 1994)
- Copyright (Infringing File Sharing) Amendment Act 2011 (Copyright Act 1994)
- Corrections Amendment Act 2011 (Corrections Act 2004)
- Crimes Amendment Act 2011 (Crimes Act 1961)
- Crimes Amendment Act (No 2) 2011 (Crimes Act 1961)
- Crimes Amendment Act (No 3) 2011 (Crimes Act 1961)
- Crimes Amendment Act (No 4) 2011 (Crimes Act 1961)
- Criminal Disclosure Amendment Act 2011 (Criminal Disclosure Act 2008)
- Criminal Procedure (Mentally Impaired Persons) Amendment Act 2011 (Criminal Procedure (Mentally Impaired Persons) Act 2003)
- Criminal Proceeds (Recovery) Amendment Act 2011 (Criminal Proceeds (Recovery) Act 2009)
- Customs and Excise Amendment Act 2011 (Customs and Excise Act 1996)
- Dairy Industry Restructuring (New Sunset Provisions) Amendment Act 2011 (Dairy Industry Restructuring Act 2001)
- Disputes Tribunals Amendment Act 2011 (Disputes Tribunals Act 1988)
- District Courts Amendment Act 2011 (District Courts Act 1947)
- District Courts Amendment Act (No 2) 2011 (District Courts Act 1947)
- Domestic Violence Amendment Act 2011 (Domestic Violence Act 1995)
- Education Amendment Act 2011 (Education Act 1989)
- Education (Freedom of Association) Amendment Act 2011 (Education Act 1989)
- Electoral (Administration) Amendment Act 2011 (Electoral Act 1993)
- Evidence Amendment Act 2011 (Evidence Act 2006)
- Family Courts Amendment Act 2011 (Family Courts Act 1980)
- Financial Advisers Amendment Act 2011 (Financial Advisers Act 2008)
- Financial Reporting Amendment Act 2011 (Financial Reporting Act 1993)
- Fisheries Amendment Act 2011 (Fisheries Act 1996)
- Hazardous Substances and New Organisms Amendment Act 2011 (Hazardous Substances and New Organisms Act 1996)
- Immigration Amendment Act 2011 (Immigration Act 2009)
- Imports and Exports (Restrictions) Amendment Act 2011 (Imports and Exports (Restrictions) Act 1988)
- Juries Amendment Act 2011 (Juries Act 1981)
- Justices of the Peace Amendment Act 2011 (Justices of the Peace Act 1957)
- KiwiSaver Amendment Act 2011 (KiwiSaver Act 2006)
- Land Transport Amendment Act 2011 (Land Transport Act 1998)
- Land Transport (Road Safety and Other Matters) Amendment Act 2011 (Land Transport Act 1998)
- Local Government (Auckland Council) Amendment Act 2011 (Local Government (Auckland Council) Act 2009)
- Maori Commercial Aquaculture Claims Settlement Amendment Act 2011 (Maori Commercial Aquaculture Claims Settlement Act 2004)
- Maori Fisheries Amendment Act 2011 (Maori Fisheries Act 2004)
- Maori Trust Boards Amendment Act 2011 (Maori Trust Boards Act 1955)
- Misuse of Drugs Amendment Act 2011 (Misuse of Drugs Act 1975)
- Misuse of Drugs Amendment Act (No 2) 2011 (Misuse of Drugs Act 1975)
- Misuse of Drugs Amendment Act 1978 Amendment Act 2011 (Misuse of Drugs Amendment Act 1978)
- New Zealand Bill of Rights Amendment Act 2011 (New Zealand Bill of Rights Act 1990)
- New Zealand Security Intelligence Service Amendment Act 2011 (New Zealand Security Intelligence Service Act 1969)
- Ozone Layer Protection Amendment Act 2011 (Ozone Layer Protection Act 1996)
- Personal Property Securities Amendment Act 2011 (Personal Property Securities Act 1999)
- Policing (Storage of Youth Identifying Particulars) Amendment Act 2011 (Policing Act 2008)
- Prisoners' and Victims' Claims Amendment Act 2011 (Prisoners' and Victims' Claims Act 2005)
- Privacy Amendment Act 2011 (Privacy Act 1993)
- Railways Amendment Act 2011 (Railways Act 2005)
- Residential Tenancies Amendment Act 2011 (Residential Tenancies Act 1986)
- Resource Management Amendment Act 2011 (Resource Management Act 1991)
- Resource Management Amendment Act (No 2) 2011 (Resource Management Act 1991)
- Securities Amendment Act 2011 (Securities Act 1978)
- Securities Markets Amendment Act 2011(Securities Markets Act 1988)
- Sentencing Amendment Act 2011 (Sentencing Act 2002)
- Sentencing Amendment Act (No 2) 2011 (Sentencing Act 2002)
- Smoke-free Environments (Controls and Enforcement) Amendment Act 2011 (Smoke-free Environments Act 1990)
- Social Security Amendment Act 2011 (Social Security Act 1964)
- Summary Proceedings Amendment Act 2011 (Summary Proceedings Act 1957)
- Summary Proceedings Amendment Act (No 2) 2011 (Summary Proceedings Act 1957)
- Tax Administration Amendment Act 2011 (Tax Administration Act 1994)
- Te Ture Whenua Maori Amendment Act 2011 (Te Ture Whenua Maori Act 1993)
- Telecommunications (TSO, Broadband, and Other Matters) Amendment Act 2011 (Telecommunications Act 2001)
- Television New Zealand Amendment Act 2011 (Television New Zealand Act 2003)
- Trade Marks Amendment Act 2011 (Trade Marks Act 2002)
- Victims' Rights Amendment Act 2011 (Victims' Rights Act 2002)
- Weathertight Homes Resolution Services (Financial Assistance Package) Amendment Act 2011 (Weathertight Homes Resolution Services Act 2006)

== 2012 ==
- Antarctica (Environmental Protection: Liability Annex) Amendment Act 2012
- Callaghan Innovation Act 2012
- Cultural Property (Protection in Armed Conflict) Act 2012
- Electronic Identity Verification Act 2012
- Exclusive Economic Zone and Continental Shelf (Environmental Effects) Act 2012
- Hutt City Council (Graffiti Removal) Act 2012
- Identity Information Confirmation Act 2012
- Legislation Act 2012
- Maraeroa A and B Blocks Claims Settlement Act 2012
- Maraeroa A and B Blocks Incorporation Act 2012
- Military Manoeuvres Act Repeal Act 2012
- National Animal Identification and Tracing Act 2012
- National War Memorial Park (Pukeahu) Empowering Act 2012
- Nga Wai o Maniapoto (Waipa River) Act 2012
- Ngai Tāmanuhiri Claims Settlement Act 2012
- Ngāti Mākino Claims Settlement Act 2012
- Ngāti Manawa Claims Settlement Act 2012
- Ngāti Manuhiri Claims Settlement Act 2012
- Ngāti Pāhauwera Treaty Claims Settlement Act 2012
- Ngati Porou Claims Settlement Act 2012
- Ngāti Whare Claims Settlement Act 2012
- Ngāti Whātua Ōrākei Claims Settlement Act 2012
- Road User Charges Act 2012
- Rongowhakaata Claims Settlement Act 2012
- Sale and Supply of Alcohol Act 2012
- Search and Surveillance Act 2012
- Southland District Council (Stewart Island/Rakiura Visitor Levy) Empowering Act 2012

== 2013 ==
- Auctioneers Act 2013
- Family Dispute Resolution Act 2013
- Financial Markets Conduct Act 2013
- Financial Reporting Act 2013
- Game Animal Council Act 2013
- Housing Accords and Special Housing Areas Act 2013
- Inquiries Act 2013
- Kaipara District Council (Validation of Rates and Other Matters) Act 2013
- Members of Parliament (Remuneration and Services) Act 2013
- Mines Rescue Act 2013
- Mokomoko (Restoration of Character, Mana, and Reputation) Act 2013 / Te Ture mō Mokomoko (Hei Whakahoki i te Ihi, te Mana, me te Rangatiratanga) 2013
- New Zealand International Convention Centre Act 2013
- Ngāti Whātua o Kaipara Claims Settlement Act 2013
- Non-bank Deposit Takers Act 2013
- Patents Act 2013
- Prohibition of Gang Insignia in Government Premises Act 2013
- Psychoactive Substances Act 2013
- Royal Succession Act 2013
- South Taranaki District Council (Cold Creek Rural Water Supply) Act 2013
- Waitaha Claims Settlement Act 2013
- Waitaki District Council Reserves and Other Land Empowering Act 2013
- WorkSafe New Zealand Act 2013

== 2014 ==
- Airports (Cost Recovery for Processing of International Travellers) Act 2014
- Arts Council of New Zealand Toi Aotearoa Act 2014
- Food Act 2014
- Haka Ka Mate Attribution Act 2014
- Heritage New Zealand Pouhere Taonga Act 2014
- Kaikōura (Te Tai o Marokura) Marine Management Act 2014
- Maungaharuru-Tangitū Hapū Claims Settlement Act 2014
- New Zealand Mission Trust Board (Otamataha) Empowering Act 2014
- Ngā Mana Whenua o Tāmaki Makaurau Collective Redress Act 2014
- Ngāti Apa ki te Rā Tō, Ngāti Kuia, and Rangitāne o Wairau Claims Settlement Act 2014
- Ngāti Hauā Claims Settlement Act 2014
- Ngāti Kōata, Ngāti Rārua, Ngāti Tama ki Te Tau Ihu, and Te Ātiawa o Te Waka-a-Māui Claims Settlement Act 2014
- Ngāti Koroki Kahukura Claims Settlement Act 2014
- Ngāti Rangiteaorere Claims Settlement Act 2014
- Ngāti Rangiwewehi Claims Settlement Act 2014
- Ngati Toa Rangatira Claims Settlement Act 2014
- Parliamentary Privilege Act 2014
- Public Safety (Public Protection Orders) Act 2014
- Raukawa Claims Settlement Act 2014
- Subantarctic Islands Marine Reserves Act 2014
- Sullivan Birth Registration Act 2014
- Tapuika Claims Settlement Act 2014
- Tasman District Council (Validation and Recovery of Certain Rates) Act 2014
- Te Urewera Act 2014
- Trade (Safeguard Measures) Act 2014
- Tūhoe Claims Settlement Act 2014
- Veterans' Support Act 2014
- Victims' Orders Against Violent Offenders Act 2014
- Vulnerable Children Act 2014
- West Coast Wind-blown Timber (Conservation Lands) Act 2014

== 2015 ==
- Arts Centre of Christchurch Trust Act 2015
- Christchurch City Council (Rates Validation) Act 2015
- Environmental Reporting Act 2015
- Harmful Digital Communications Act 2015
- Hawke's Bay Regional Planning Committee Act 2015
- Health and Safety at Work Act 2015
- Land Transport (Speed Limits Validation and Other Matters) Act 2015
- New Zealand Flag Referendums Act 2015
- Ngāi Takoto Claims Settlement Act 2015
- Ngāti Kahu Accumulated Rentals Trust Act 2015
- Ngāti Kuri Claims Settlement Act 2015
- Reserves and Other Lands Disposal Act 2015
- Returning Offenders (Management and Information) Act 2015
- Social Security (Clothing Allowances for Orphans and Unsupported Children) Amendment Act 2015
- Standards and Accreditation Act 2015
- Te Aupouri Claims Settlement Act 2015
- Te Kawerau ā Maki Claims Settlement Act 2015
- Te Rarawa Claims Settlement Act 2015

== 2016 ==
- Accident Compensation Amendment Act 2016
- Burial and Cremation Amendment Act 2016
- Canterbury Property Boundaries and Related Matters Act 2016
- Child Protection (Child Sex Offender Government Agency Registration) Act 2016
- Children, Young Persons, and Their Families Amendment Act (No 2) 2016
- Christian Churches New Zealand Property Trust Board Empowering Act 2016
- Compensation for Live Organ Donors Act 2016
- Copyright Amendment Act 2016
- District Court Act 2016
- Electronic Courts and Tribunals Act 2016
- Environment Canterbury (Transitional Governance Arrangements) Act 2016
- Greater Christchurch Regeneration Act 2016
- Hineuru Claims Settlement Act 2016
- Holidays Amendment Act (No 2) 2016
- Home and Community Support (Payment for Travel Between Clients) Settlement Act 2016
- Hurunui/Kaikōura Earthquakes Emergency Relief Act 2016
- Hurunui/Kaikōura Earthquakes Recovery Act 2016
- Interest on Money Claims Act 2016
- Judicial Review Procedure Act 2016
- Land Transport Amendment Act 2016
- Medicines Amendment Act 2016
- Mental Health (Compulsory Assessment and Treatment) Amendment Act 2016
- Misuse of Drugs Amendment Act 2016
- New Zealand Business Number Act 2016
- New Zealand Public Health and Disability (Southern DHB) Elections Act 2016
- Ngāruahine Claims Settlement Act 2016
- Radiation Safety Act 2016
- Rangitāne o Manawatu Claims Settlement Act 2016
- Riccarton Racecourse Act 2016
- Riccarton Racecourse Development Enabling Act 2016
- Senior Courts Act 2016
- Smoke-free Environments (Tobacco Standardised Packaging) Amendment Act 2016
- Subordinate Legislation Confirmation Act 2016
- Taranaki Iwi Claims Settlement Act 2016
- Te Atiawa Claims Settlement Act 2016
- Te Ture mō Te Reo Māori 2016 / Māori Language Act 2016
- Trans-Pacific Partnership Agreement Amendment Act 2016
- Wellington Town Belt Act 2016

== 2017 ==
Short title	Number	Date of Royal Assent	Notes
Charities Amendment Act 2017	2017/01		
Wildlife (Powers) Amendment Act 2017	2017/02		
Taxation (Business Tax, Exchange of Information, and Remedial Matters) Act 2017	2017/03		
Substance Addiction (Compulsory Assessment and Treatment) Act	2017/04		
Contract and Commercial Law Act 2017	2017/05		
Child Protection (Child Sex Offender Government Agency Registration) Amendment Act 2017	2017/06		
Te Awa Tupua (Whanganui River Claims Settlement) Act 2017	2017/07		
Broadcasting (Election Programmes and Election Advertising) Amendment Act 2017	2017/08		
Electoral Amendment Act 2017	2017/09		
Intelligence and Security Act 2017	2017/10		
Regulatory Systems (Building and Housing) Amendment Act 2017	2017/11		
Regulatory Systems (Commercial Matters) Amendment Act 2017	2017/12		
Regulatory Systems (Workplace Relations) Amendment Act 2017	2017/13		
Taxation (Annual Rates for 2016–17, Closely Held Companies, and Remedial Matters) Act 2017	2017/14		
Resource Legislation Amendment Act 2017	2017/15		
Telecommunications (Property Access and Other Matters) Amendment Act 2017	2017/16		
Fire and Emergency New Zealand Act 2017	2017/17		
Māori Purposes Act 2017	2017/18		
Appropriation (2015/16 Confirmation and Validation) Act 2017	2017/19		
Education (Update) Amendment Act 2017	2017/20		
Trade (Anti-dumping and Countervailing Duties) Amendment Act 2017	2017/21		
Taxation (Budget Measures: Family Incomes Package) Act 2017	2017/22		
Statutes Repeal Act 2017	2017/23		
Care and Support Workers (Pay Equity) Settlement Act 2017	2017/24		
Appropriation (2016/17 Supplementary Estimates) Act 2017	2017/25		
Imprest Supply (First for 2017/18) Act 2017	2017/26		
Energy Innovation (Electric Vehicles and Other Matters) Amendment Act 2017	2017/27		
Point England Development Enabling Act 2017	2017/28		
Outer Space and High-altitude Activities Act 2017	2017/29		
Land Transfer Act 2017	2017/30		
Children, Young Persons, and Their Families (Oranga Tamariki) Legislation Act 2017	2017/31		
Vulnerable Children Amendment Act 2017	2017/32		
Civil Defence Emergency Management Amendment Act 2017	2017/33		
Land Transport Amendment Act 2017	2017/34		
Anti-Money Laundering and Countering Financing of Terrorism Amendment Act 2017	2017/35		
Appropriation (2017/18 Estimates) Act 2017	2017/36		
Imprest Supply (Second for 2017/18) Act 2017	2017/37		
Rangitāne Tū Mai Rā (Wairarapa Tamaki nui-ā-Rua) Claims Settlement Act 2017	2017/38		
Ngāti Pūkenga Claims Settlement Act 2017	2017/39		
Commerce (Cartels and Other Matters) Amendment Act 2017	2017/40		
Ngatikahu ki Whangaroa Claims Settlement Act 2017	2017/41		
Enhancing Identity Verification and Border Processes Legislation Act 2017	2017/42		

== XXXX ==
- Energy Resources Levy (1976–1991) Act By Parliamentary Counsel
- Hospitals Act 1957–1993 (by Parliamentary Counsel) Act
- War Funds Act (1915 to 1995) by Parliamentary Counsel Act

== See also ==
- Lists of acts of the New Zealand Parliament
