= Sydney Exhibition Centre @ Glebe Island =

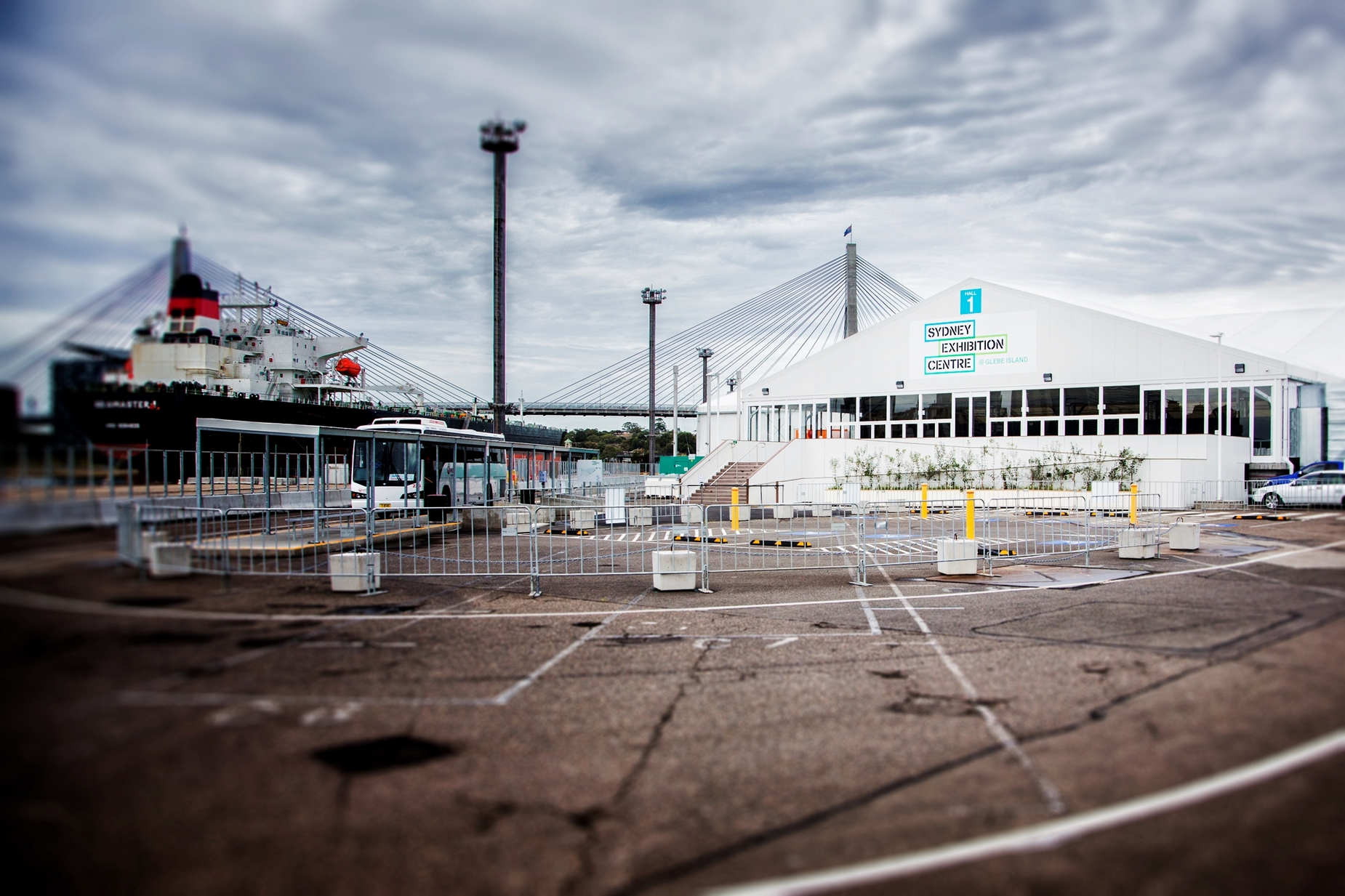
- Sydney Exhibition Centre @ Glebe Island

General information
- Status: Closed
- Type: Exhibition centre
- Location: Glebe Island, James Craig Road, Rozelle New South Wales, Sydney, Australia
- Opened: February 2014
- Closed: 30 September 2016
- Owner: NSW Government

Technical details
- Floor area: 20,000 square metres

Other information
- Parking: Yes

Website
- www.sydneyexhibitioncentre.com.au

Sydney Exhibition Centre @ Glebe Island was an interim facility purpose built at Glebe Island to house large trade and consumer shows during the development of the new International Convention Centre Sydney at Darling Harbour. The venue opened in February 2014, following the closure of the Sydney Convention & Exhibition Centre in December 2013, and closed on 30 September 2016.

The structure, which was supplied by GL Events and previously used as the media centre at the 2012 London Olympics, was located on the Sydney Harbour foreshore underneath the Anzac Bridge.

Managed by AEG Ogden, a joint venture between Australian venue management interests and AEG Facilities of the United States (Anschutz Entertainment Group), Sydney Exhibition Centre @ Glebe Island had the largest single exhibition hall in Sydney at 9,600 square metres and has 20,000 square metres of permanent exhibition space.

== Transport ==
The venue was accessible on exhibition event days by free special event ferry and bus services. Glebe Island is connected by road to the city and there was onsite car parking available at the venue.
