= AEG Ogden =

Venue management and services company

AEG Ogden was an Australian company that managed sports venues and convention centres in Australia and Asia. It was a joint venture between Australian interests and AEG Facilities (affiliate of Anschutz Entertainment Group) and Australian investors.

In 2019, the company merged with the property management company SMG, and rebranded as ASM Global.

== Venues ==
=== Arenas ===
- BCEC Great Hall
- Brisbane Entertainment Centre
- Cadillac Arena
- Cairns Arena
- Dubai Arena
- ICC Sydney Theatre
- Mercedes-Benz Arena
- Newcastle Entertainment Centre
- RAC Arena
- Qudos Bank Arena

=== Convention centres ===
- Brisbane Convention & Exhibition Centre
- Te Pae Christchurch Convention Centre
- Cairns Convention Centre
- Darwin Convention Centre
- International Convention Centre Sydney
- Kuala Lumpur Convention Centre
- Oman Convention and Exhibition Centre
- Sydney Exhibition Centre @ Glebe Island

=== Stadiums ===
- Suncorp Stadium

=== Theatres ===
- KCC Plenary Hall
- Perth Concert Hall
