= Te Pae Christchurch Convention Centre =

Convention centre in Christchurch, New Zealand

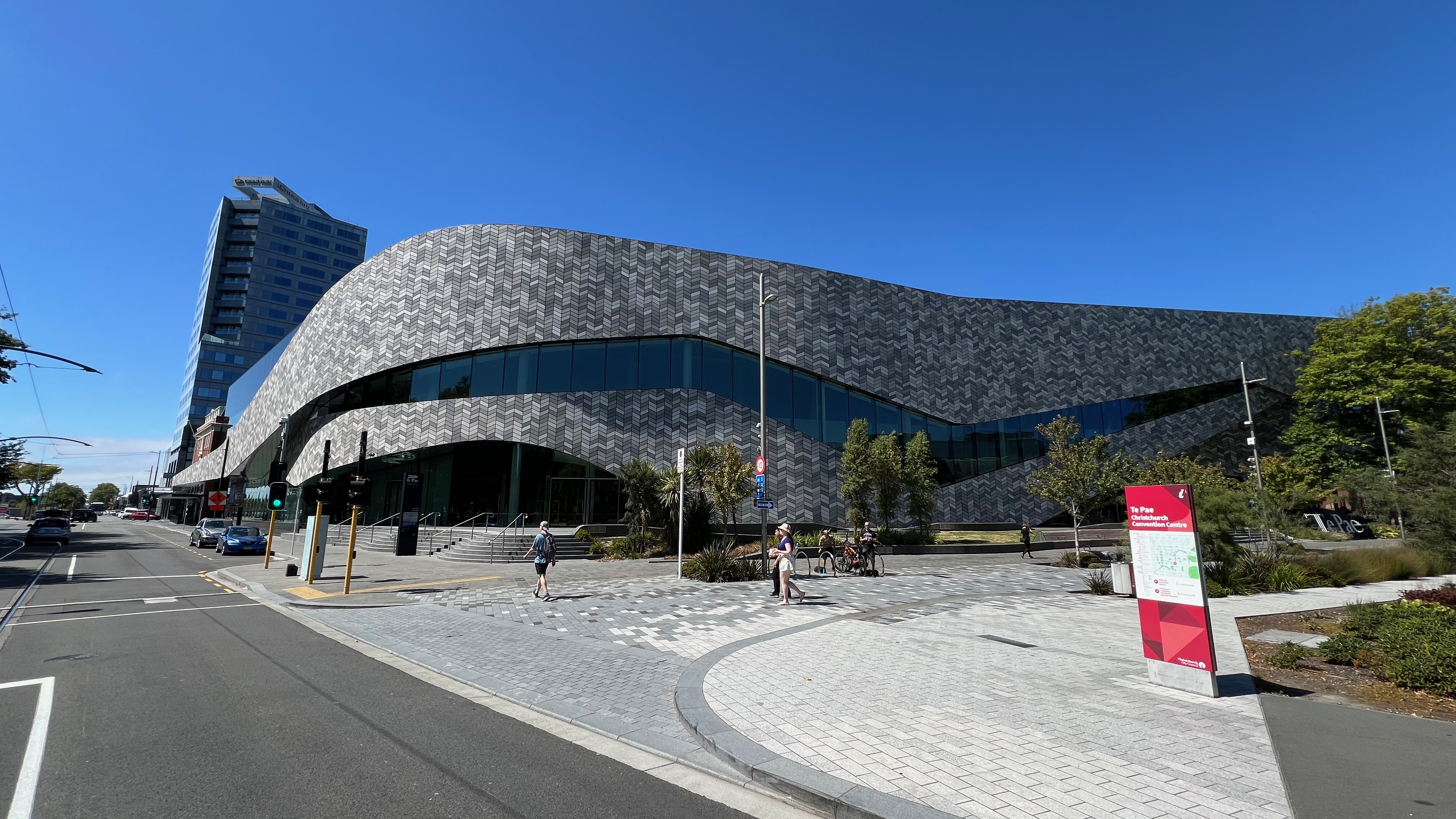
- Interactive map of Te Pae Christchurch Convention Centre
- Location: Christchurch Central City, Christchurch, New Zealand
- Coordinates: 43.52969°S 172.63557°E
- Owner: Rau Paenga Ltd (formerly Ōtākaro Ltd)
- Operator: ASM Global

Construction
- Opened: 17 December 2021; 4 years ago
- Cost: NZ$ 450 million
- Architects: Woods Bagot & Warren and Mahoney

Website
- https://www.tepae.co.nz/

Te Pae Christchurch Convention Centre is a convention centre located in Christchurch Central City, New Zealand. The centre is a replacement for the previous Christchurch Convention Centre that was demolished after the 2011 Christchurch earthquake. Originally known as the Convention Centre Precinct, construction was funded by the New Zealand Government as part of the Christchurch Central Recovery Plan. The centre is owned by the Crown through Rau Paenga Crown Infrastructure Delivery Ltd state-owned enterprise (formerly Ōtākaro Ltd), and managed by ASM Global. The polysemous name Te Pae is "inspired" by the Māori language, and can roughly be interpreted to mean "gathering place".

The precinct has an area of approximately 1.7 hectares (4.2 acres).

== Construction ==
After the demolition of the previous convention centre, construction of a replacement facility was included as part of the list of anchor projects for the rebuild of the city. Central government acquired the land using powers granted under the Canterbury Earthquake Recovery Act 2011. The site chosen covered two blocks south of Armagh Street, between the Avon River / Ōtākaro and Colombo Street. The building would include frontages towards Victoria Square, Christchurch, Oxford Terrace, and Cathedral Square. As part of the development, a section of Gloucester Street was closed to connect the two adjacent blocks. Isaac House (on the corner of Armagh and Colombo) was initially planned to be demolished to make way for the centre; ultimately the convention centre was designed around the historic building.

Te Pae was designed by Woods Bagot & Warren and Mahoney. The initial design was submitted in 2012. Plenary Conventions New Zealand (PCNZ) was initially selected to develop the plan in 2014. This was to be a consortium between Plenary Group, Ngāi Tahu Property and the Carter Group. This would have included the construction and operation of the facility and surrounding areas for 10 years. After some delays, construction was due to start in 2016. At the time, earthquake recovery minister Gerry Brownlee said he expected the centre to be built for "slightly in excess" of the NZ$284,000,000 that had been initially set aside. The partnership collapsed in 2016, with PCNZ unable to meet design requirements within the budget provided. This was despite the cancellation of features including an on-site hotel and parking building. Construction was further delayed, finally beginning in 2017. The facility was due to open in 2020, but this was pushed further back by the COVID-19 pandemic. It finally opened to the public in 2021, with a total project cost of NZ$450,000,000.

== Facilities and design ==
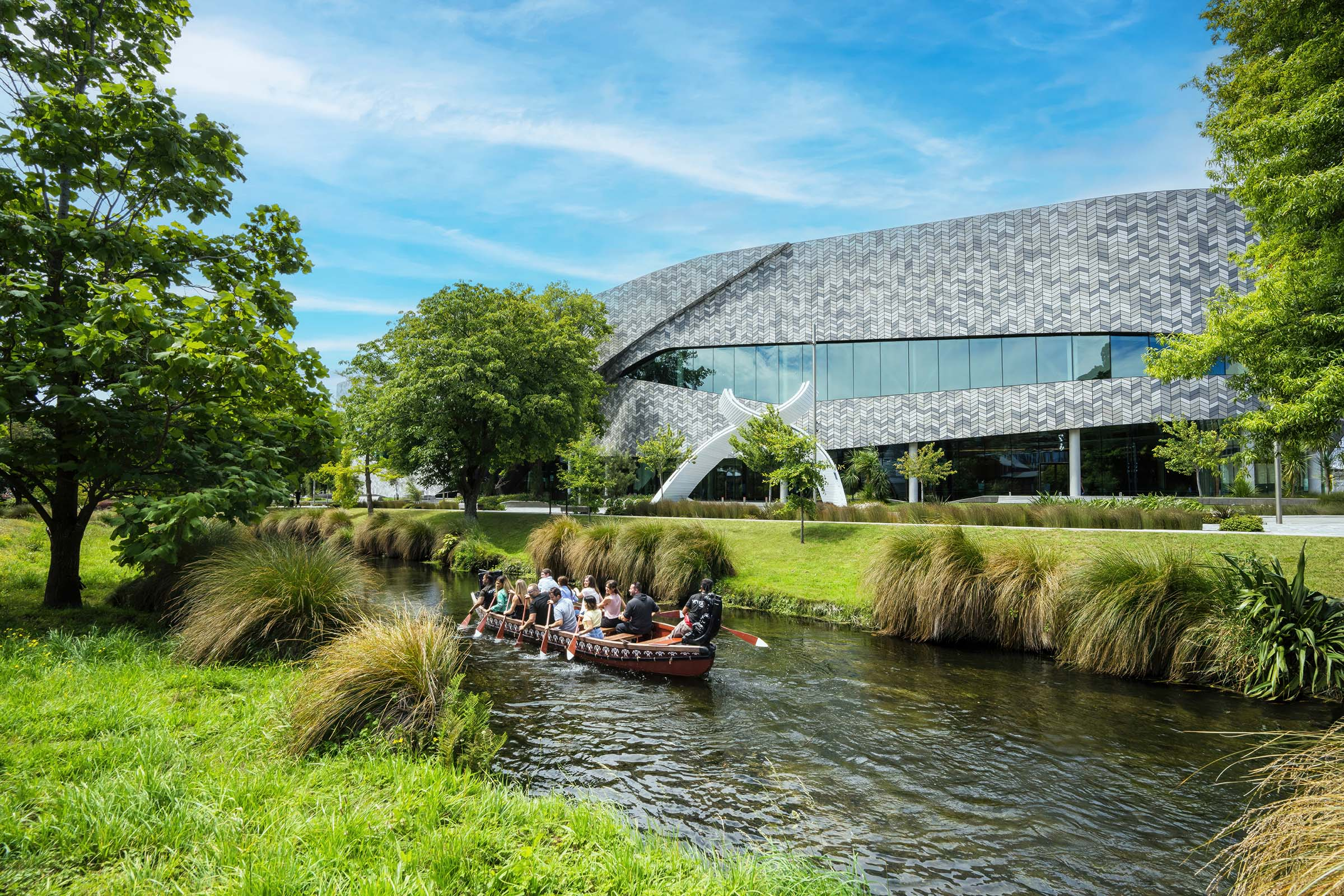
Te Pae venue behind Avon River / Ōtākaro

The 43,000 exterior tiles reflect the Canterbury region's braided rivers; the river concept is extended throughout the building, influencing the shape of the windows and the carpet design.

The reception area contains a marble reception desk, timber columns, and an illuminated artwork named Hana, designed by sculptor Loni Hutchinson. It includes a 1400-seat auditorium that can divide into two 700-seat areas. There are numerous conference rooms downstairs and a 2800m^{2} exhibition hall that can be partitioned or enlarged to 3300m^{2}. The banquet hall has a capacity of 1000 people used for gatherings and seminars. The River Rooms, which overlooks the Avon River / Ōtākaro, can accommodate up to 500 people apiece. They can be joined to accommodate 1,000 guests for major banquets and gala events.

== Management ==
ASM Global manages the venue, which employs around eighty people full-time, while around 400 people are employed part-time or casual to provide technical, hospitality, and security services for events.
