= Isaac House, Christchurch =

Commercial building in Christchurch, New Zealand

Isaac House
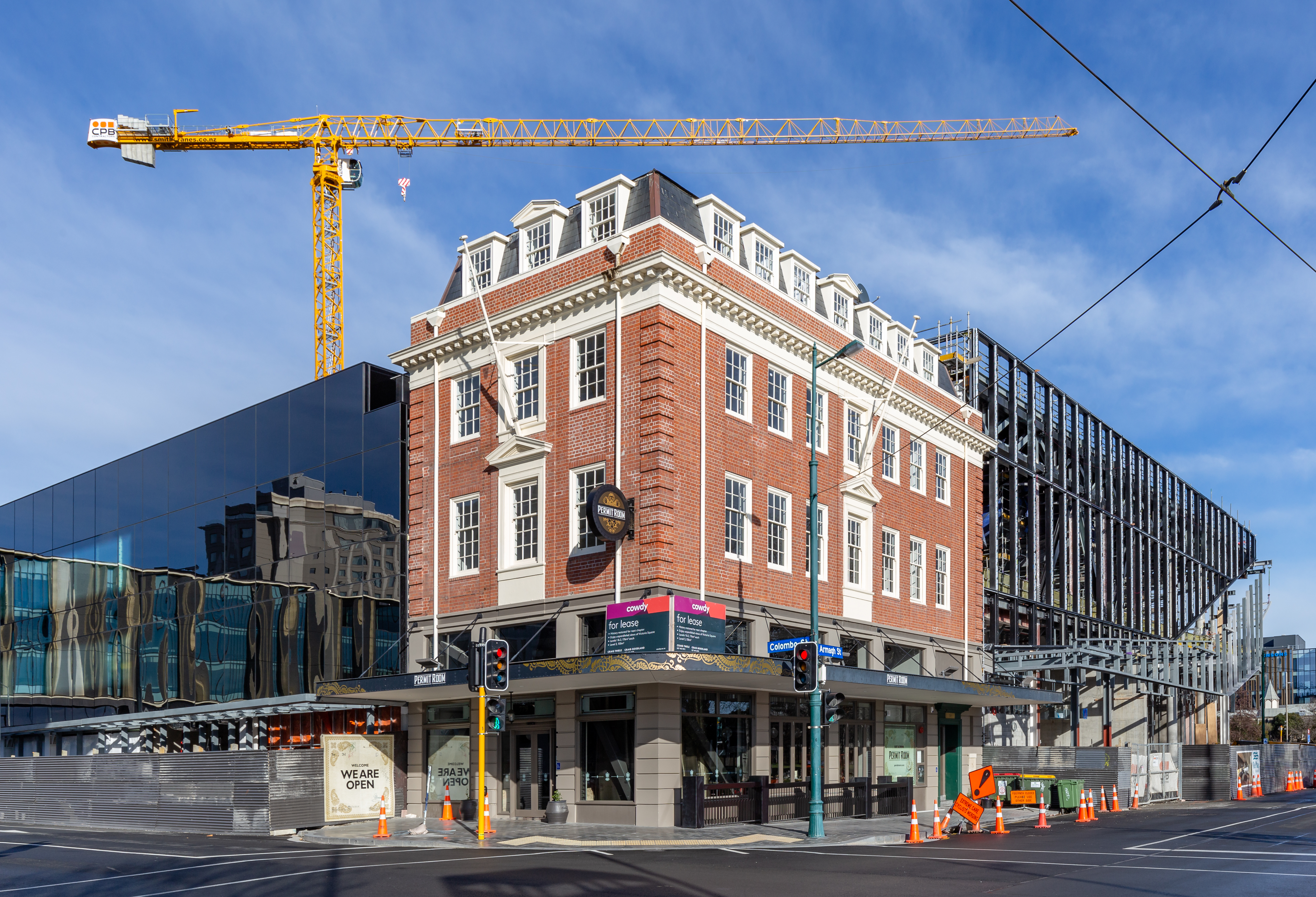
- Isaac House in 2019, while the Christchurch Convention Centre Precinct was being constructed around it.
- Interactive map of the Isaac House area

General information
- Type: Office
- Architectural style: Inter-war Georgian revival
- Location: Christchurch Central City, 779 Colombo Street, Christchurch, New Zealand
- Coordinates: 43.52891°S 172.63639°E
- Current tenants: The Victoria Free House
- Completed: 1926

Technical details
- Floor count: 4

Design and construction
- Architects: Heathcote Helmore & Cotterill

Heritage New Zealand – Category 2
- Designated: 1997-04-04
- Reference no.: 7383

References
- "Isaac House". New Zealand Heritage List/Rārangi Kōrero. Heritage New Zealand.

Isaac House, previously also known as the Cook & Ross Building and the National Bank Building is a heritage-listed building opposite Victoria Square, Christchurch, on the south-western corner of Armagh and Colombo streets.

== History ==
The land around Market Place (later Victoria Square) was some of the first sold in Christchurch. The original lot where Isaac House now stands was number TS 587, and was sold to the builder Isaac Luck in 1851. In 1859 a two-storey wooden building named The Apothecaries' Hall was constructed on the site by builder Thomas Tombs for the doctors Turnbull and Hilson, beginning nearly a century of the site being used for medical rooms. In 1926 the pharmacists Cook & Ross built the present-day Isaac House on the site. They occupied the ground floor, and rented the floors above to mostly dentists and surgeons. In 1962 the National Bank of New Zealand took over the ground floor, and over the following decades they gradually extended their offices into the upper floors, replacing the previous tenants.

The building was purchased in 1999 by Lady Diana Isaac, with the goal of conserving and restoring the building. She lived in a private apartment on the top floor. After the 2011 Christchurch earthquake, the building was scheduled to be demolished to make way for the Convention Centre Precinct by the Canterbury Earthquake Recovery Authority, but CERA later reversed the decision to use the land in 2014. It was purchased and restored by property investors Patrick Fontein and Paul Naylor.

== Gallery ==
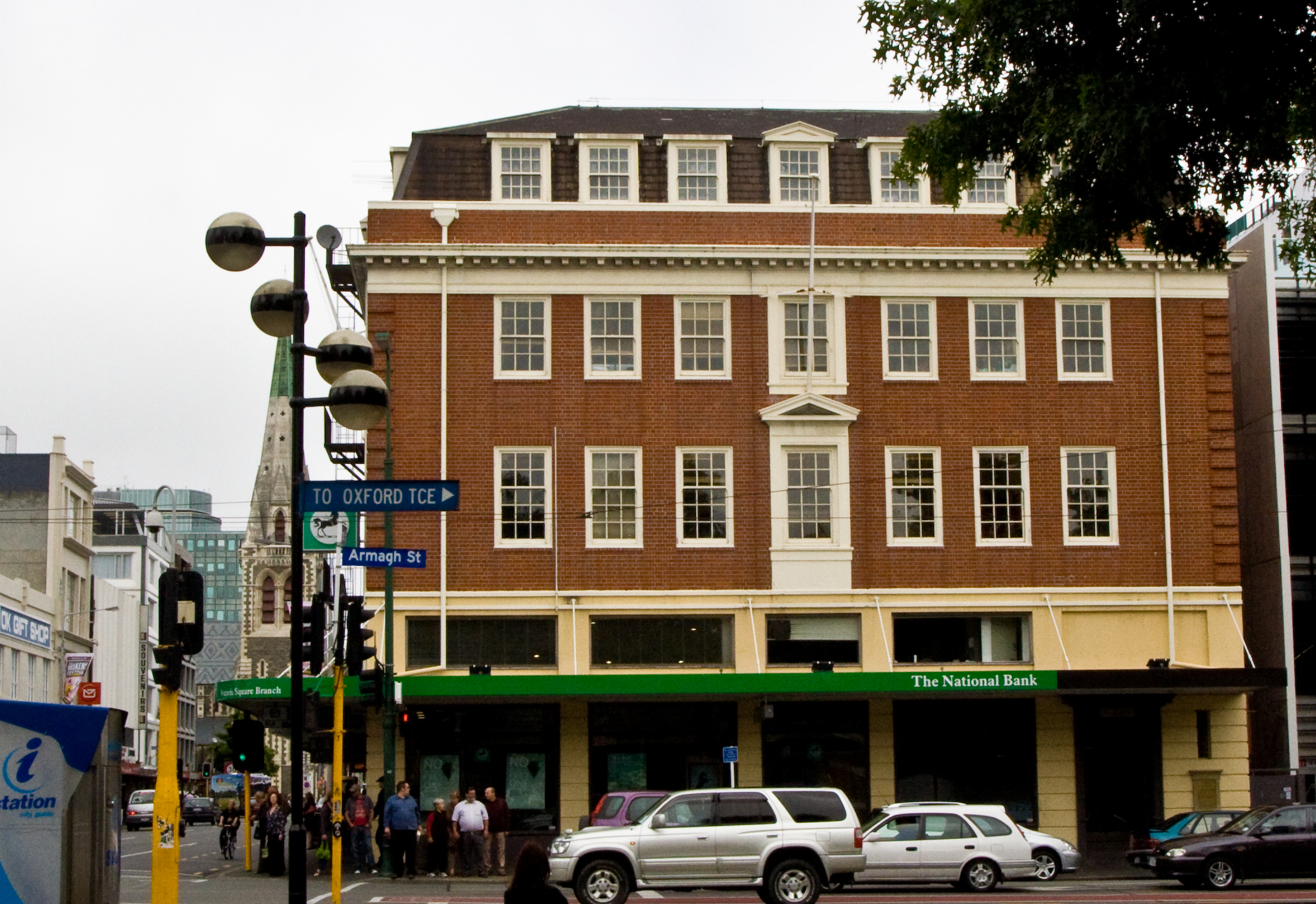
Frontage of Isaac House on Armagh Street in 2010, before the 2011 Christchurch earthquake.

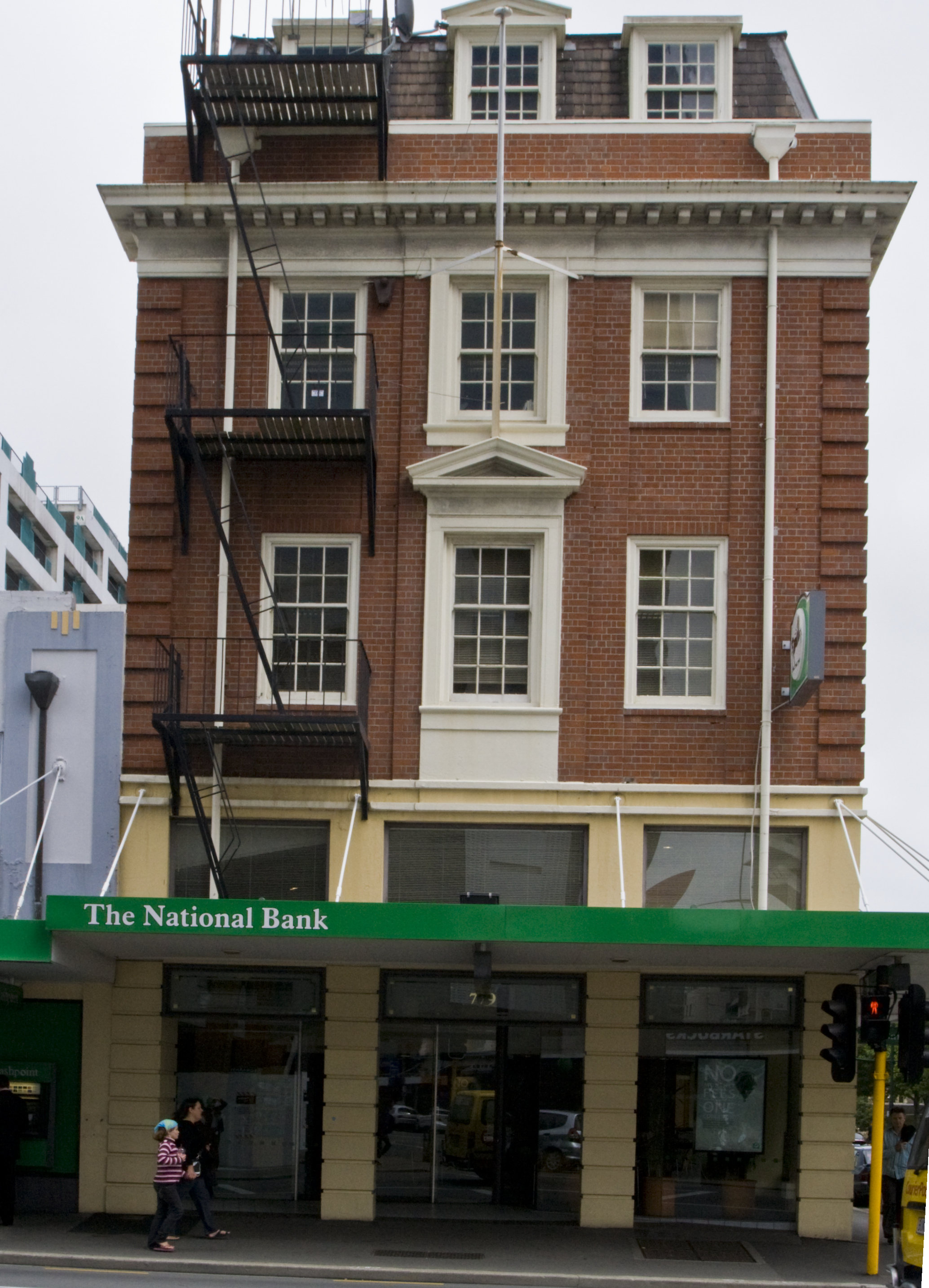
Frontage on Colombo Street in 2010.

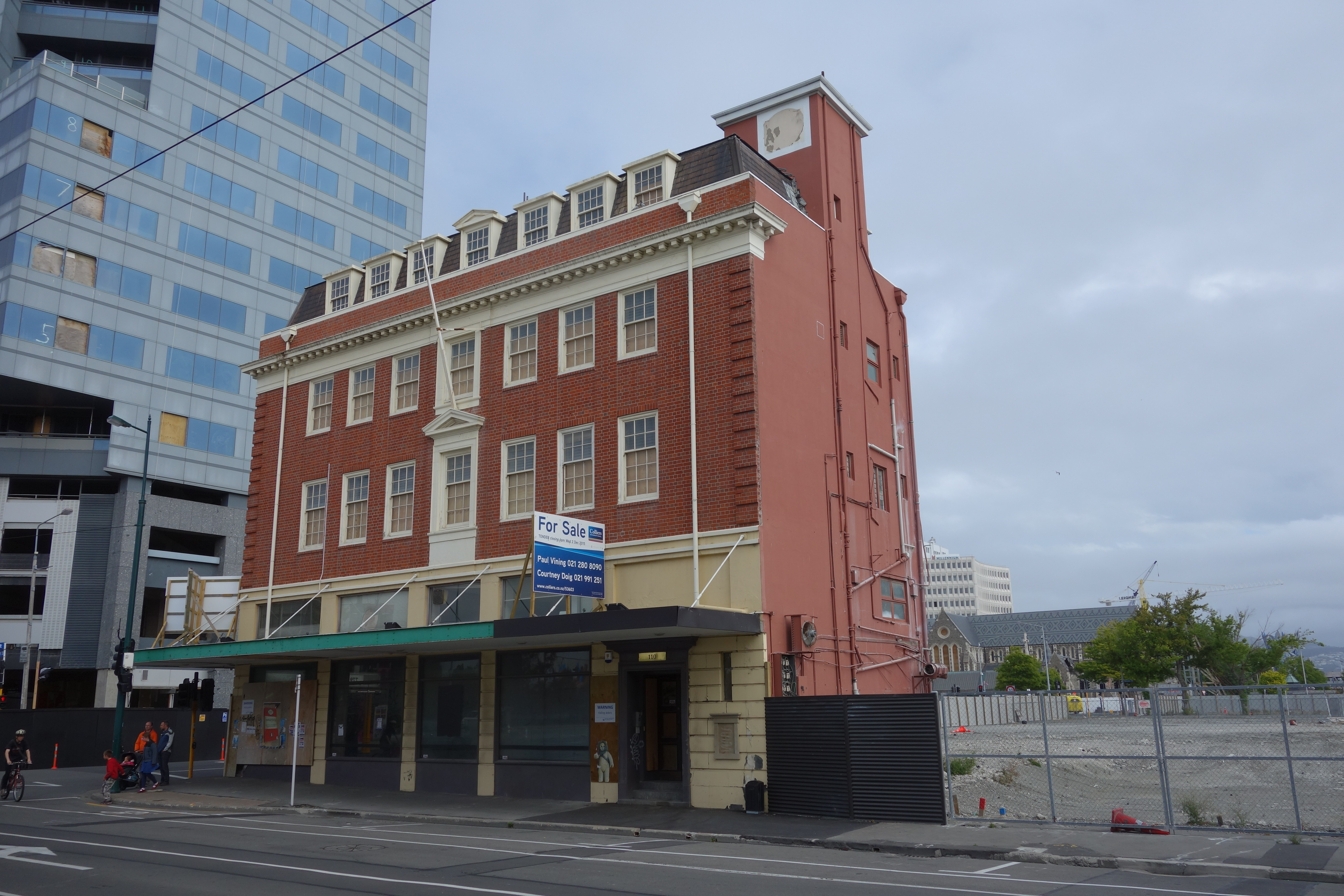
Isaac House in 2015, with the surrounding buildings demolished.

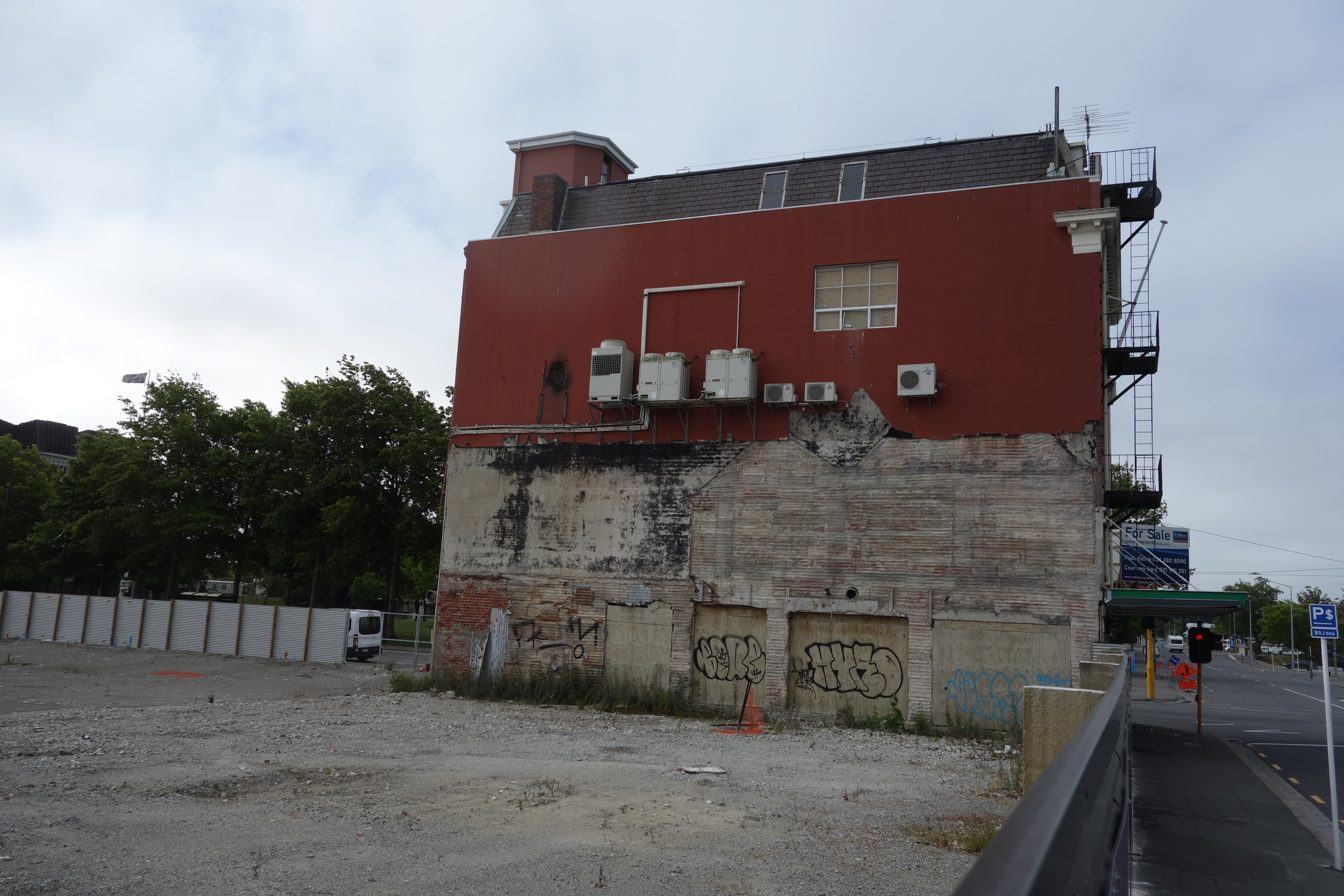
The back of the building before the construction of the surrounding Convention Centre Precinct.
