= International Convention Centre Sydney =

Building in Darling Harbour, Sydney, New South Wales, Australia

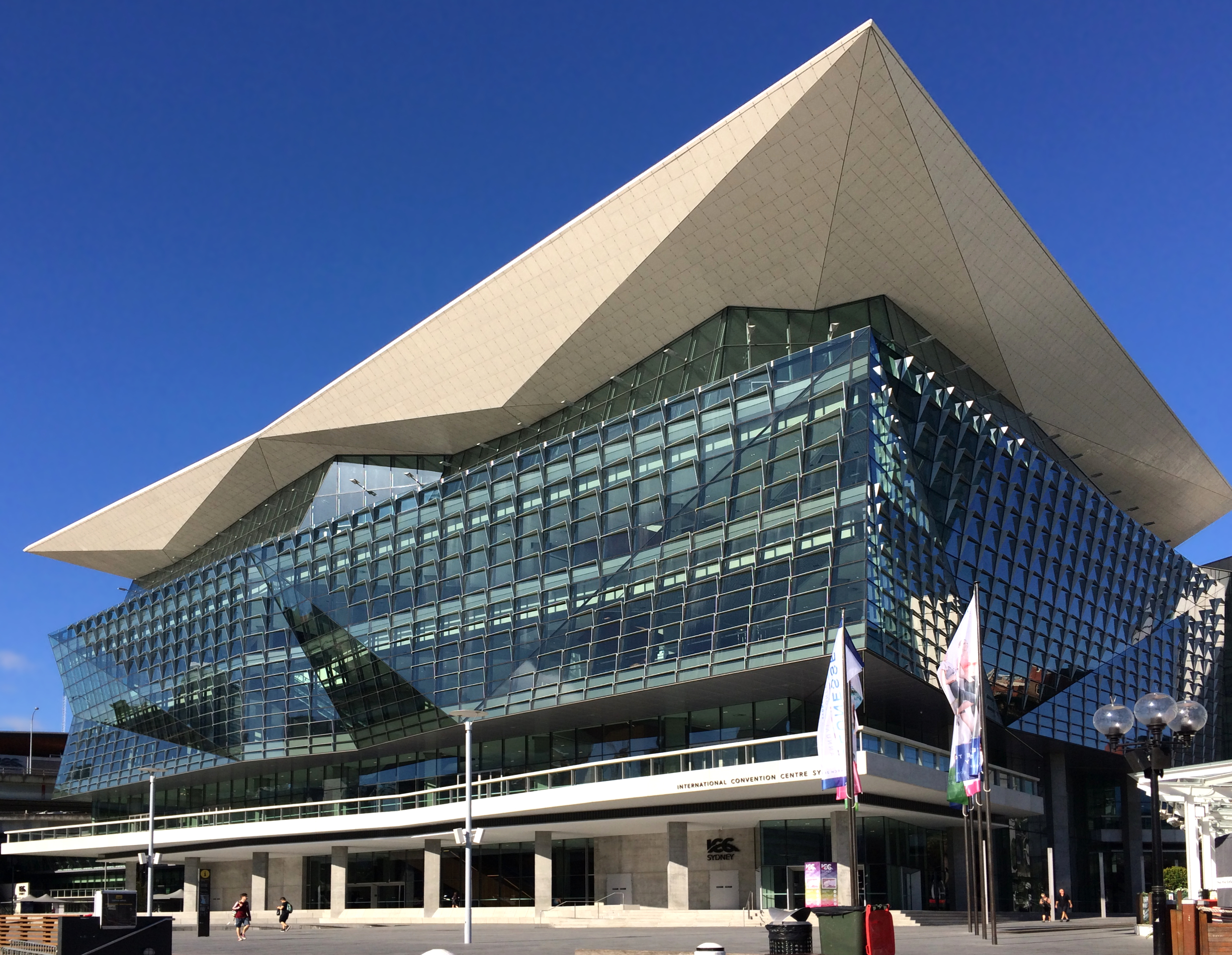
- Exterior view in March 2017
- Alternative names: ICC Sydney; TikTok Entertainment Centre (theatre)

General information
- Location: Darling Harbour, 14 Darling Drive; Sydney, New South Wales, Australia
- Coordinates: 33°52′24″S 151°11′56″E
- Groundbreaking: 10 January 2014
- Opened: 12 December 2016
- Cost: A$1.5 billion
- Owner: Government of New South Wales
- Operator: ASM Global

Design and construction
- Architects: Hassell; Populous
- Structural engineer: Robert Bird Group
- Civil engineer: Hyder Consulting
- Quantity surveyor: ESO Surveyors
- Main contractor: Lendlease

Website
- Official Website

International Convention Centre Sydney
- Public transit: Exhibition Centre; Convention

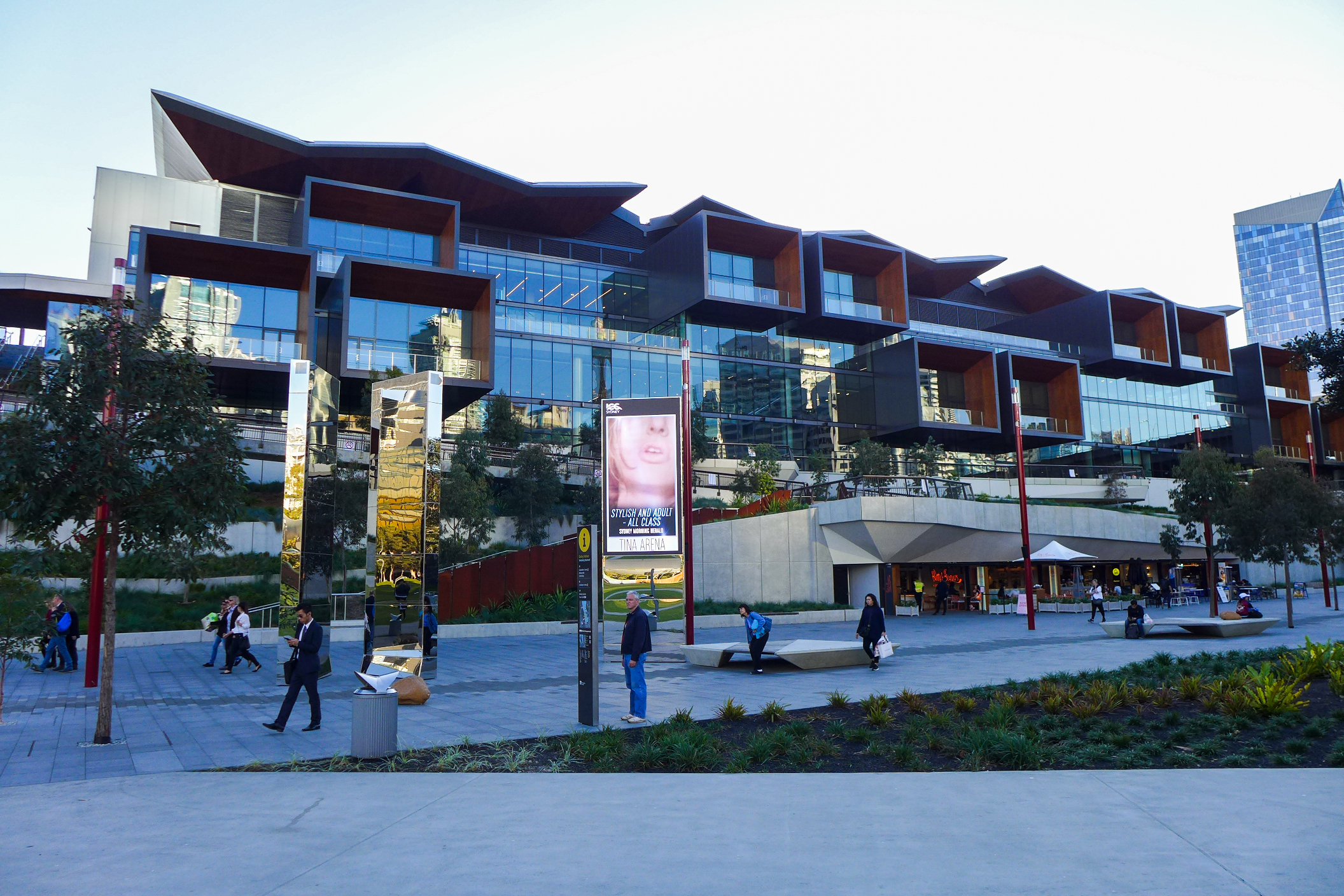
ICC Sydney Exhibition Centre

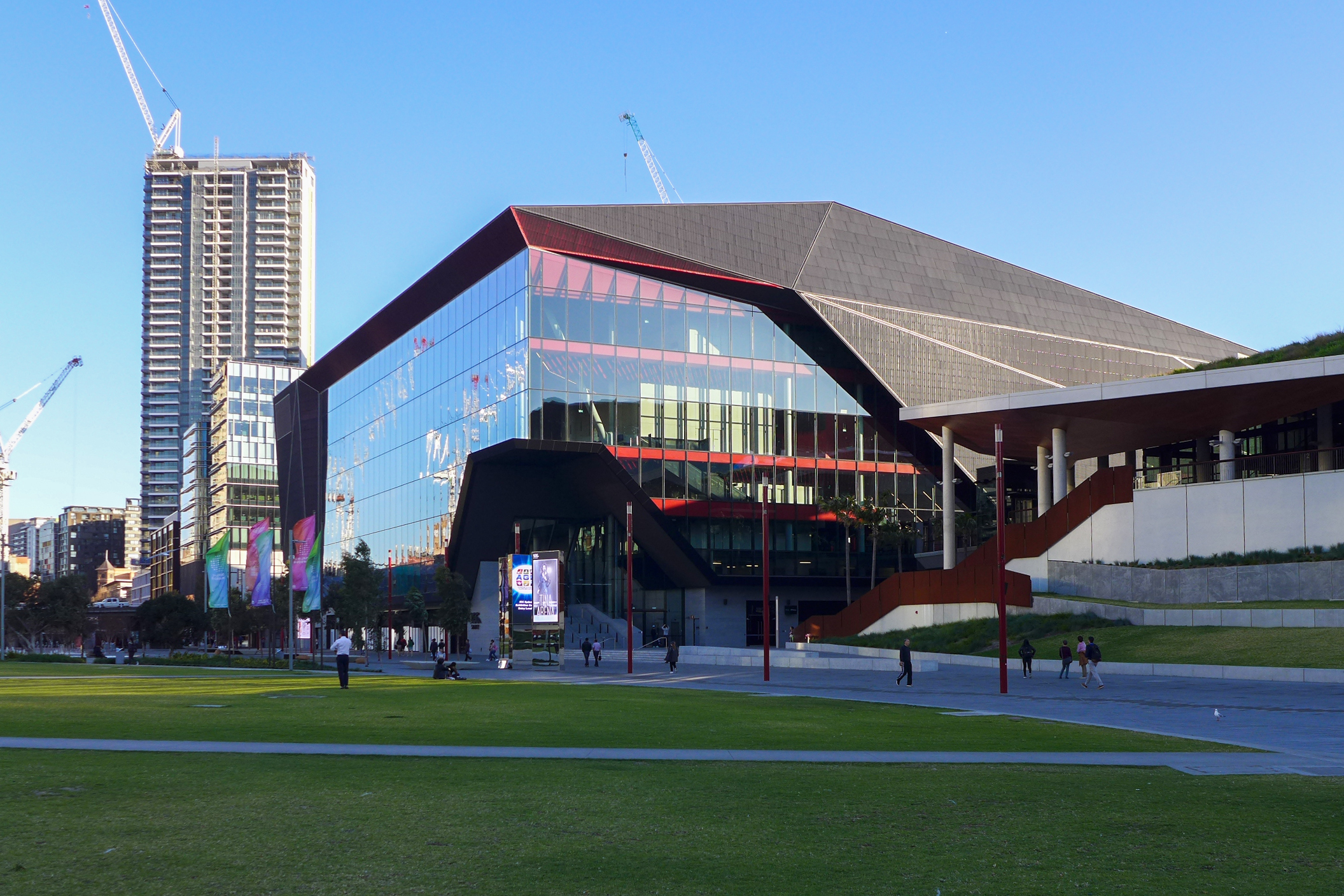
TikTok Entertainment Centre

The International Convention Centre Sydney (also known as ICC Sydney) is a convention and exhibition centre in Sydney, New South Wales, Australia. The centre opened in December 2016 as a replacement for the Sydney Convention and Exhibition Centre, which was demolished in 2013. ICC Sydney has over 70 meeting rooms, three theatres, and two formal ballrooms. The theatre within the centre has been known as the TikTok Entertainment Centre under a naming rights partnership with social media platform, TikTok, since November 2025.

ICC Sydney includes convention spaces for 2,500, 1,000, and 750 people. It also includes a flexible space of 2,500 square metres (27,000 sq ft) and the largest ballroom in Sydney, able to accommodate 2,000 people. The ICC Exhibition Centre and Entertainment Centre includes 33,000 square metres (360,000 sq ft) of exhibition space, which can be divided into smaller spaces according to requirements. The first major event held at the newly-developed centre was RTX Sydney, hosted by Rooster Teeth Productions on 4–5 February 2017.

ICC Sydney was developed by a consortium comprising AEG Ogden, Lendlease, Capella Capital, and Spotless, with AEG Ogden acting as the venue operator.

== Location ==
ICC Sydney is located in the Darling Harbour on the western side of the Sydney central business district.

== History and structure ==
ICC Sydney was designed by two architectural firms, Hassell and Populous. It replaces the former Sydney Convention & Exhibition Centre that was demolished in December 2013. Construction began in early 2014; an estimated 32,000 cubic metres (1,100,000 cu ft) of concrete was used to construct the building.

ICC Sydney is a A$1.5 billion development being delivered through a Public Private Partnership (PPP) with the Government of New South Wales and Darling Harbour Live (comprising LendLease, Hostplus, Capella Capital, AEG Ogden and Spotless). The development of ICC Sydney is part of a broader A$3.4 billion works program at Darling Harbour that includes a new 590 room hotel tower (under the Sofitel brand), a residential and commercial development (Darling Square), pedestrian boulevard and improved public domain upgrade. The works also include a reconfiguration of Tumbalong Park to provide an additional 3,000 m^{2} (32,000 sq ft) of green space acting as a new adaptable event space.

In accordance with the contractual agreement with Darling Harbour Live and the NSW Government, secured First State Super, an equity partner in the PPP's consortium, as the naming rights sponsor for the venue's 9,000-seat entertainment theatre, which was called "First State Super Theatre". In 2020, following First State's rebrand to Aware Super, the theatre was named Aware Super Theatre. These naming rights ended in December 2023 and the theatre reverted to its original name of ICC Sydney Theatre. In November 2025, TikTok acquired the naming rights to the theatre and renamed it the "TikTok Entertainment Centre". The new name pays homage to the former Sydney Entertainment Centre, which the theatre replaced as Darling Harbour's main concert venue.

=== Construction milestones ===
- July 2015, ICC Sydney Hotel construction commenced. The hotel consists of 35 storeys and approximately 600 rooms. It is managed by AccorHotels under its Sofitel brand.
- September 2015, Topping Out Ceremony for the ICC Sydney Theatre. The ceremony that marked the completion of the concrete pour for the top floor of the ICC Sydney Theatre was attended by NSW Premier Mike Baird and Infrastructure Minister Andrew Constance.

== Controversy ==
The 1989 Sir John Sulman Medal for Public Architecture was awarded to Philip Cox Richardson Taylor Partners as joint winners for the Sydney Exhibition Centre, Darling Harbour, which was demolished in 2014 to make way for the new development. Architects John Andrews and Philip Cox spoke out over the demolition of the Sydney Convention & Exhibition Centre completed in 1988, criticising the fact that the existing structures had not been incorporated into the new development.

== Facilities ==
ICC Sydney consists of three conjoined key structures:

- TikTok Entertainment Centre (previously known as ICC Sydney Theatre (December 2016 – July 2019 and December 2023 – November 2025), First State Super Theatre (July 2019 – July 2020), and Aware Super Theatre (July 2020 – December 2023)
- ICC Sydney Exhibition Centre
- ICC Sydney Convention Centre, including several event spaces such as The Gallery, The Grand Ballroom, and Event Deck.
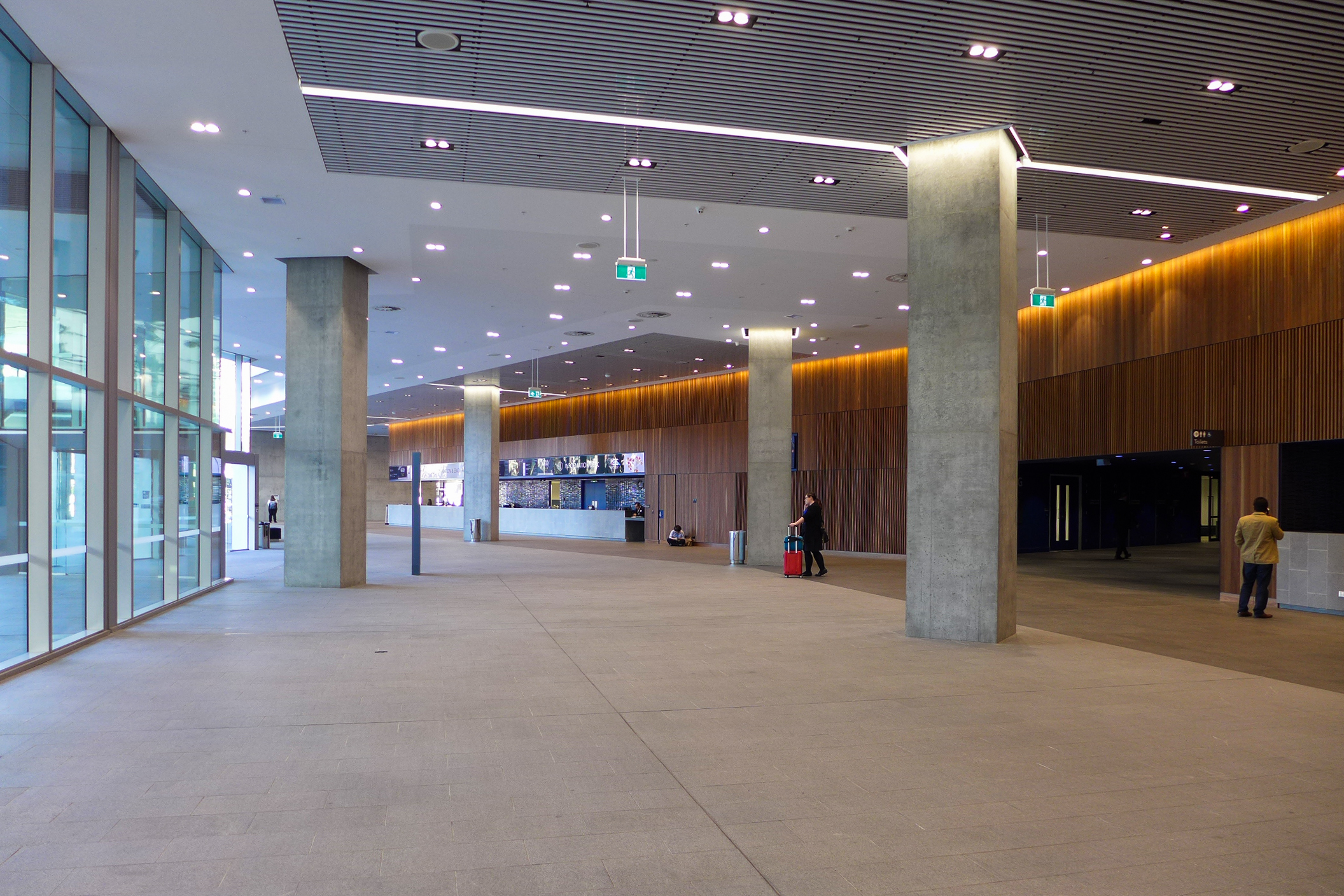
ICC Sydney Convention Centre lobby

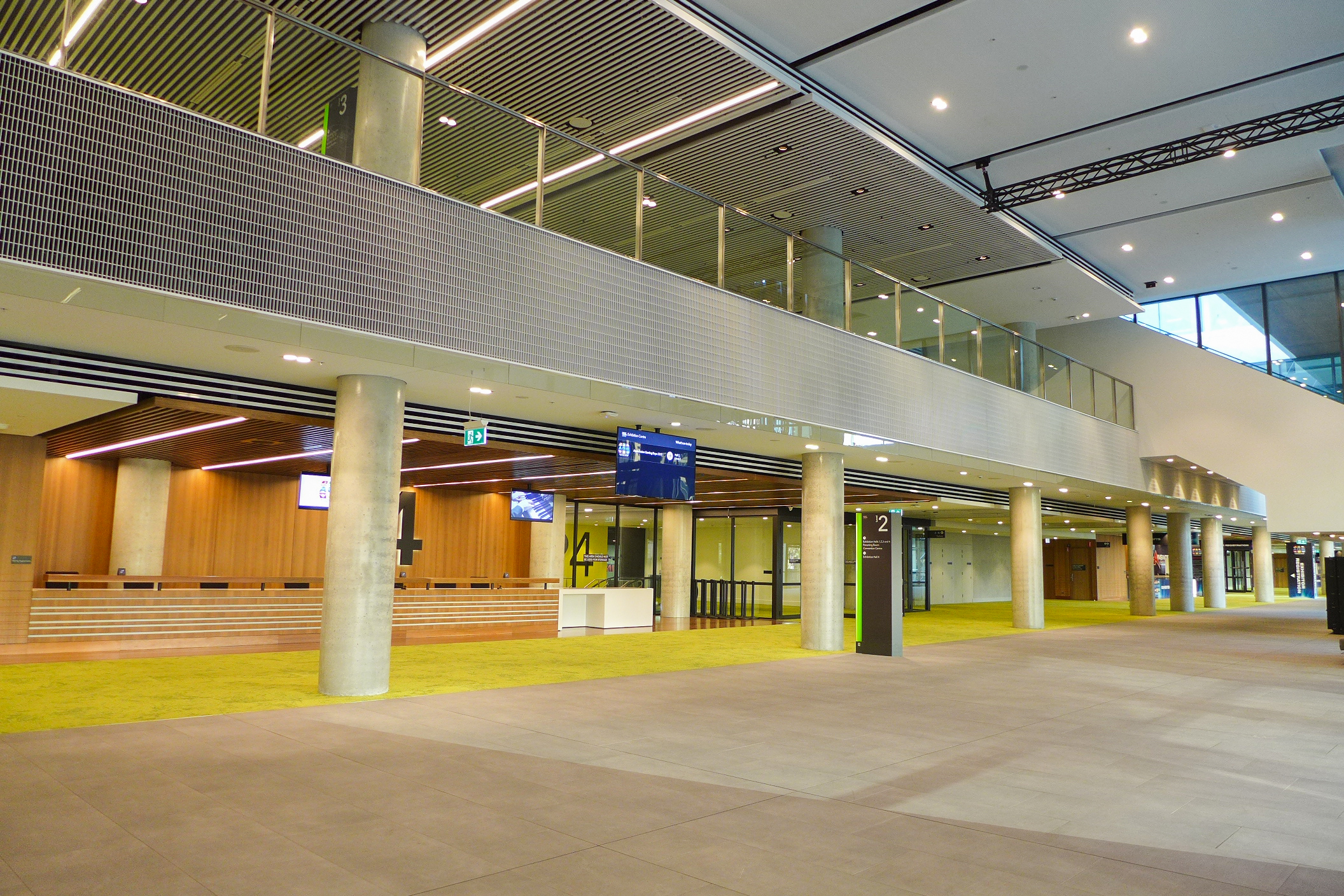
ICC Sydney Exhibition Centre Level 2 lobby

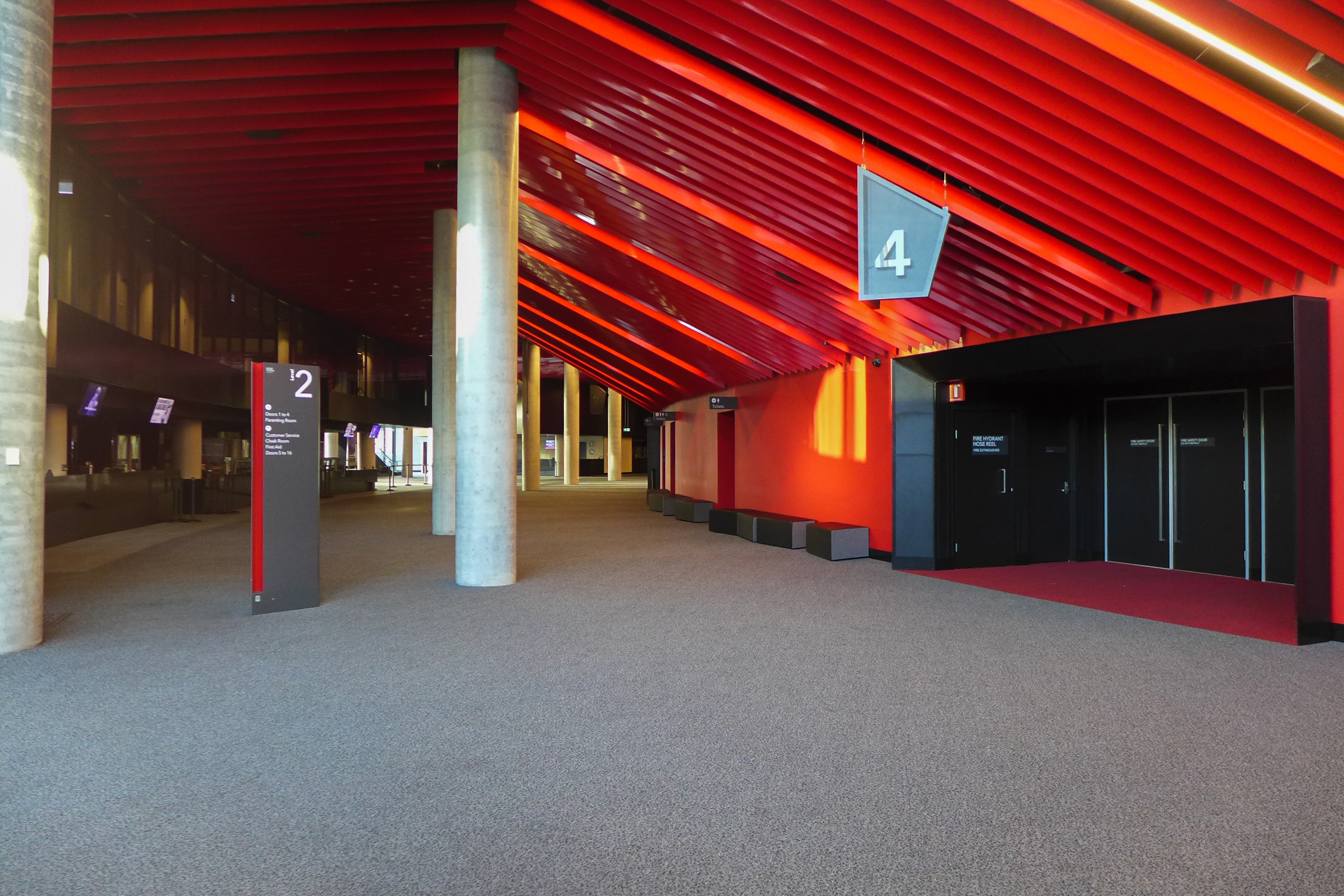
TikTok Entertainment Centre lobby

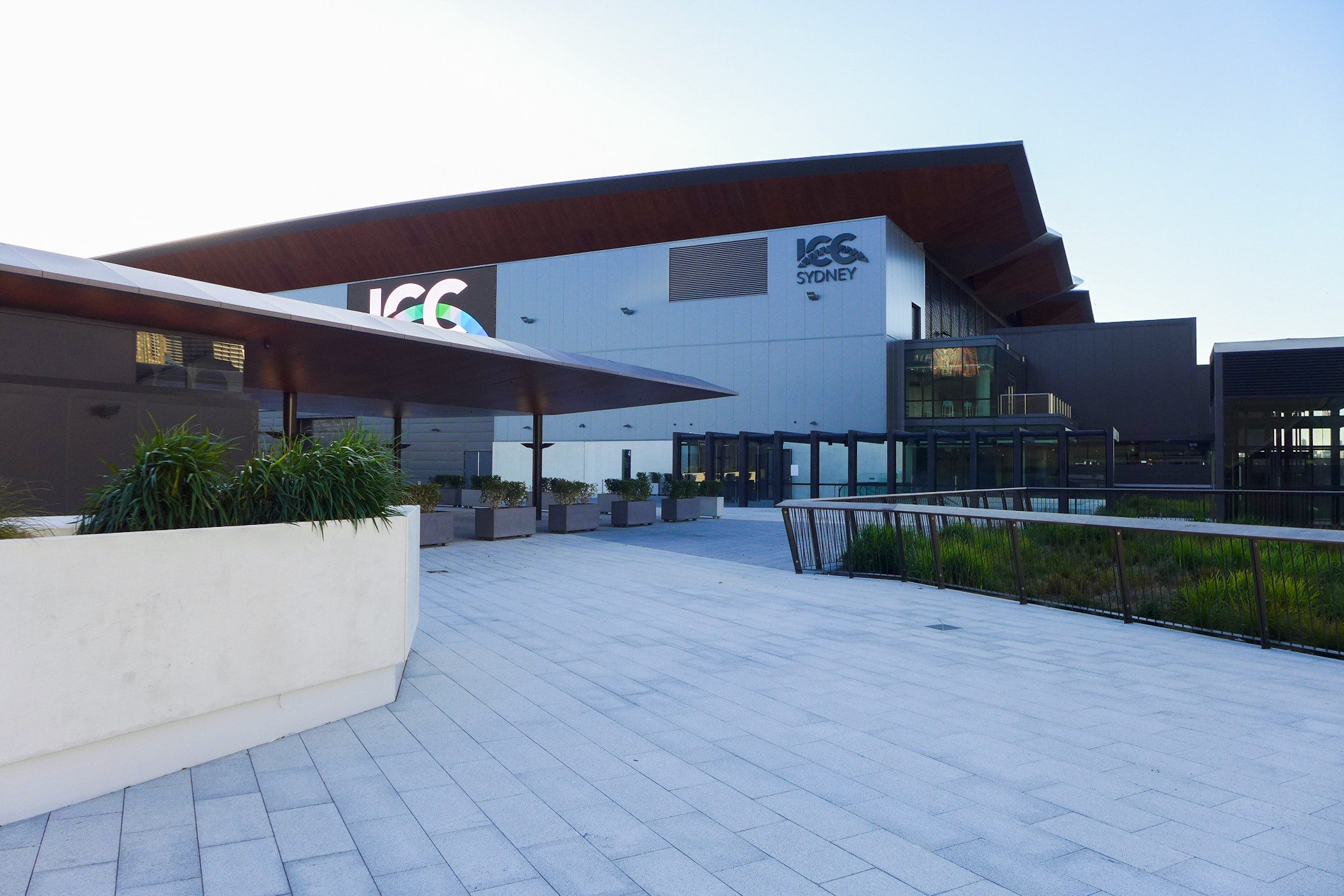
ICC Sydney Exhibition Centre Level 4 Event Deck

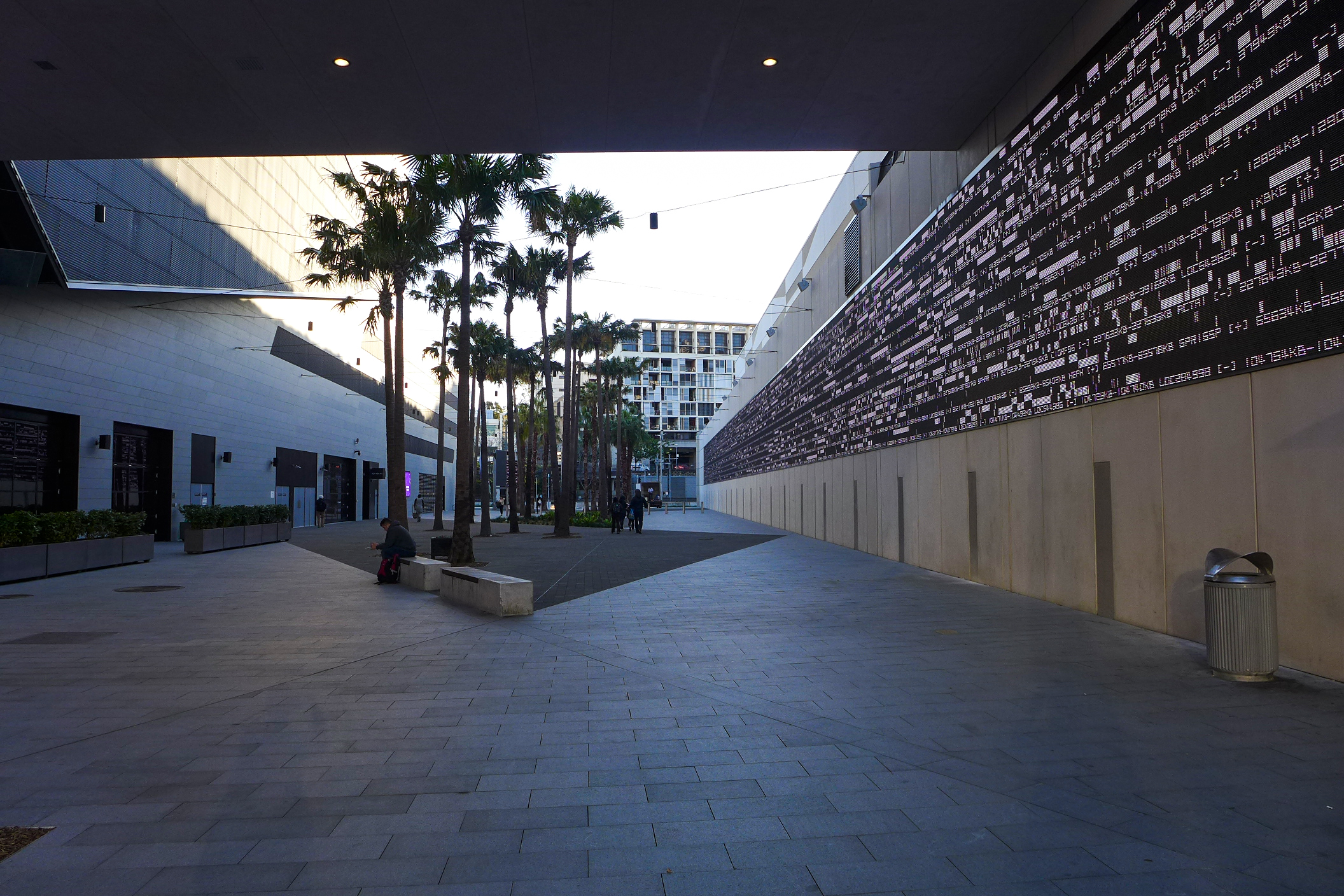
Moriarty Walk

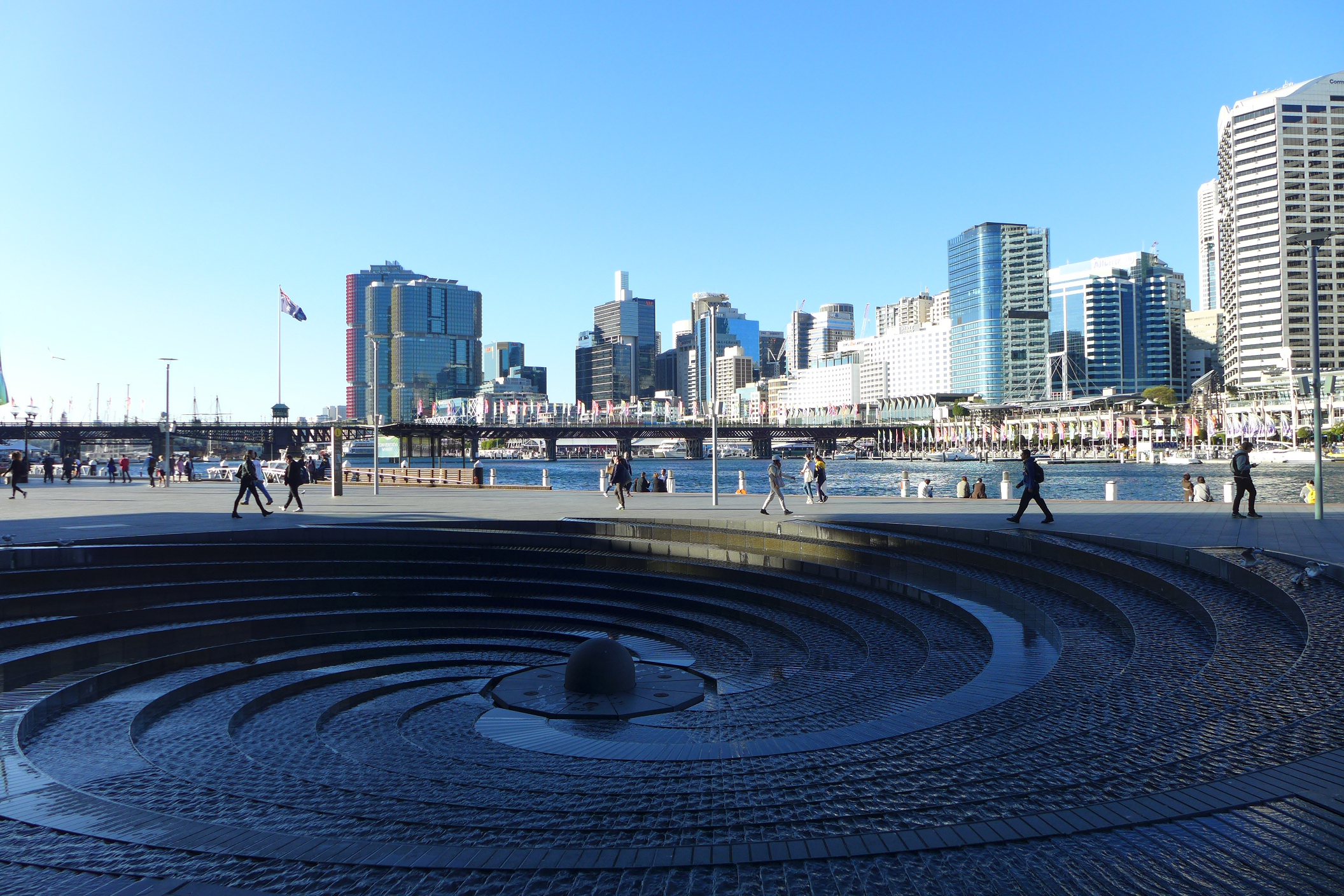
Tidal Cascades designed by Robert Woodward and retained from the original 1980s redevelopment.

== Hosted events ==
Events held at ICC Sydney include:

- RTX Sydney 2017
- AIPC 2017 Annual Conference
- International Chamber of Commerce World Chambers Federation (ICC WCF) 2017
- World Chambers Congress, 2017
- Amway China Leadership Seminar, 2017
- Dangerous Woman Tour by Ariana Grande, 8 and 9 September 2017
- RTX Sydney 2018
- Sibos, 2018
- SMASH! (Sydney Manga and Anime Show), 2018–present
- Here We Go Again Tour by Cher, 21 October 2018
- ASAP Live in Sydney, 20 October 2018
- Madman Anime Festival Sydney, 2019
- Golden Tour by Kylie Minogue, 5 and 6 March 2019
- Farewell Yellow Brick Road Tour by Elton John, 21 and 23 December 2019
- Hillsong Colour Conference yearly in March
- The Script Greatest Hits Tour, 16 September 2022 and Satellites World Tour, 30 January 2025
- At Their Very Best by The 1975, 14 April 2023
- Intel Extreme Masters Sydney, 20–22 October 2023
- Train Australia Tour, 24 May 2025
- Kelsea Ballerini Live, 2025
- Billy Strings Live, 2025
- Five Keep on Movin' Tour, 2026
- ASAP XP Australia, 25 July 2026
- BINI: Signals World Tour, 27 September 2026
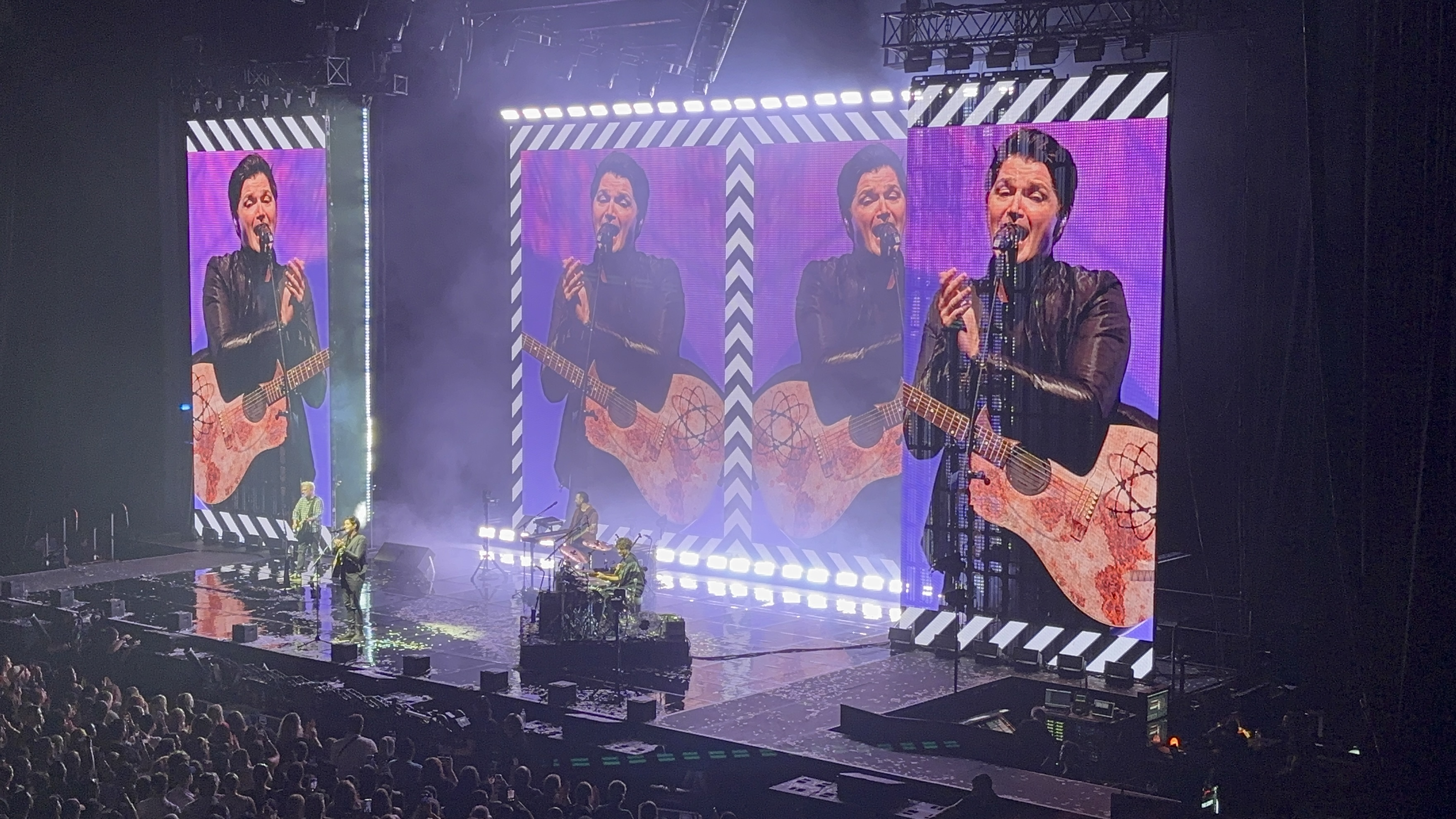
The Script, January 2025

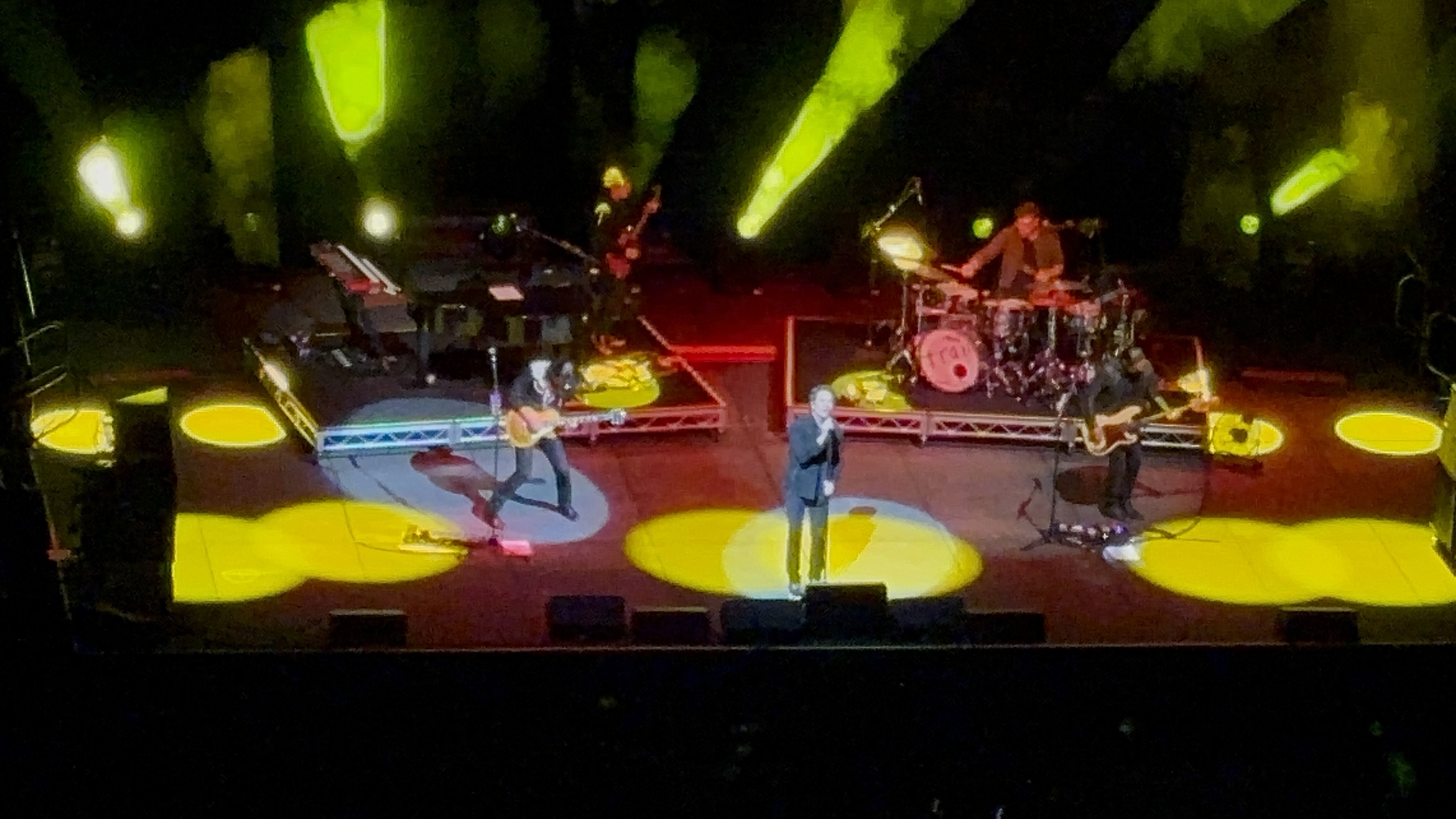
Train, May 2025

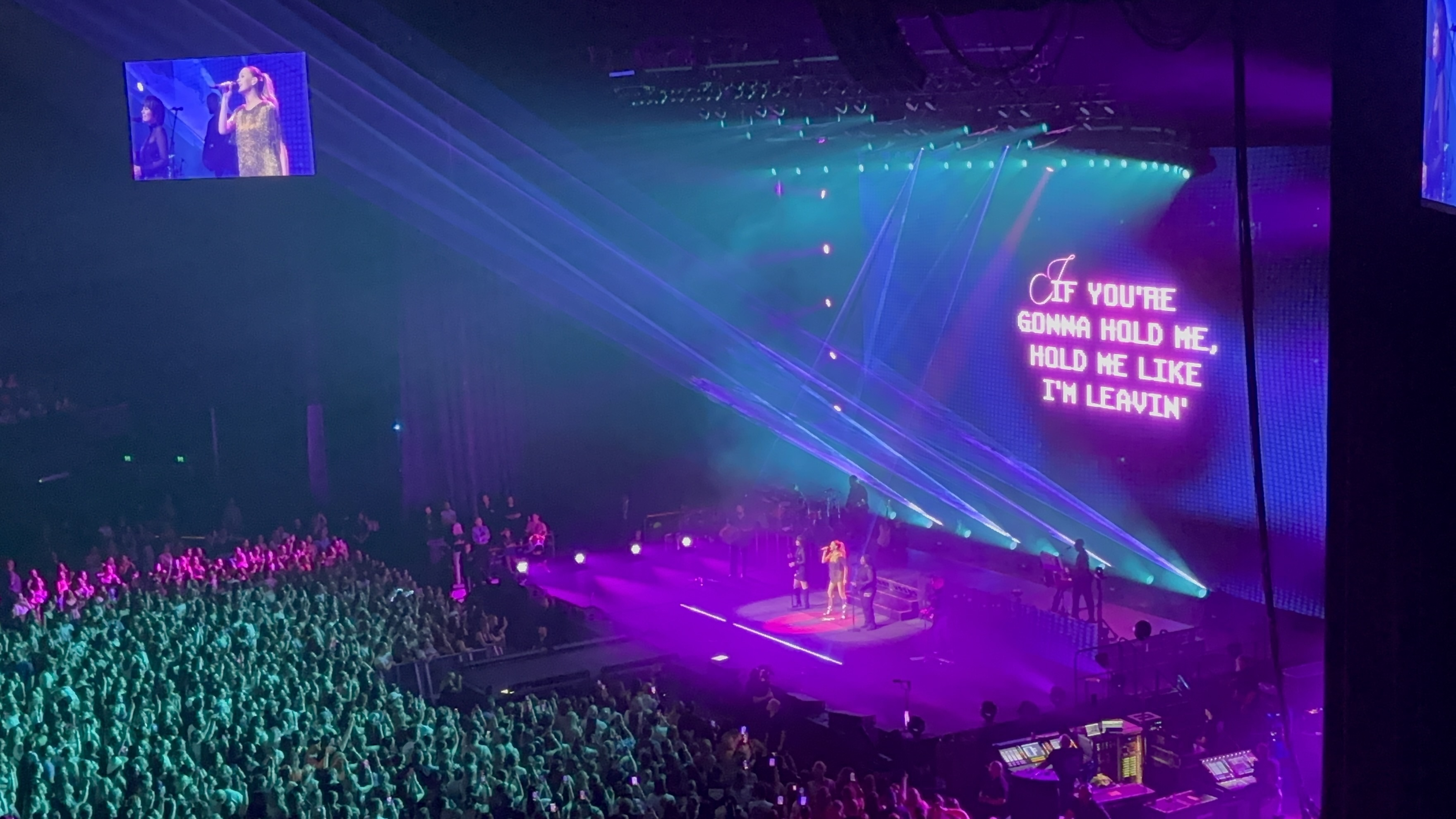
Kelsea Ballerini, December 2025

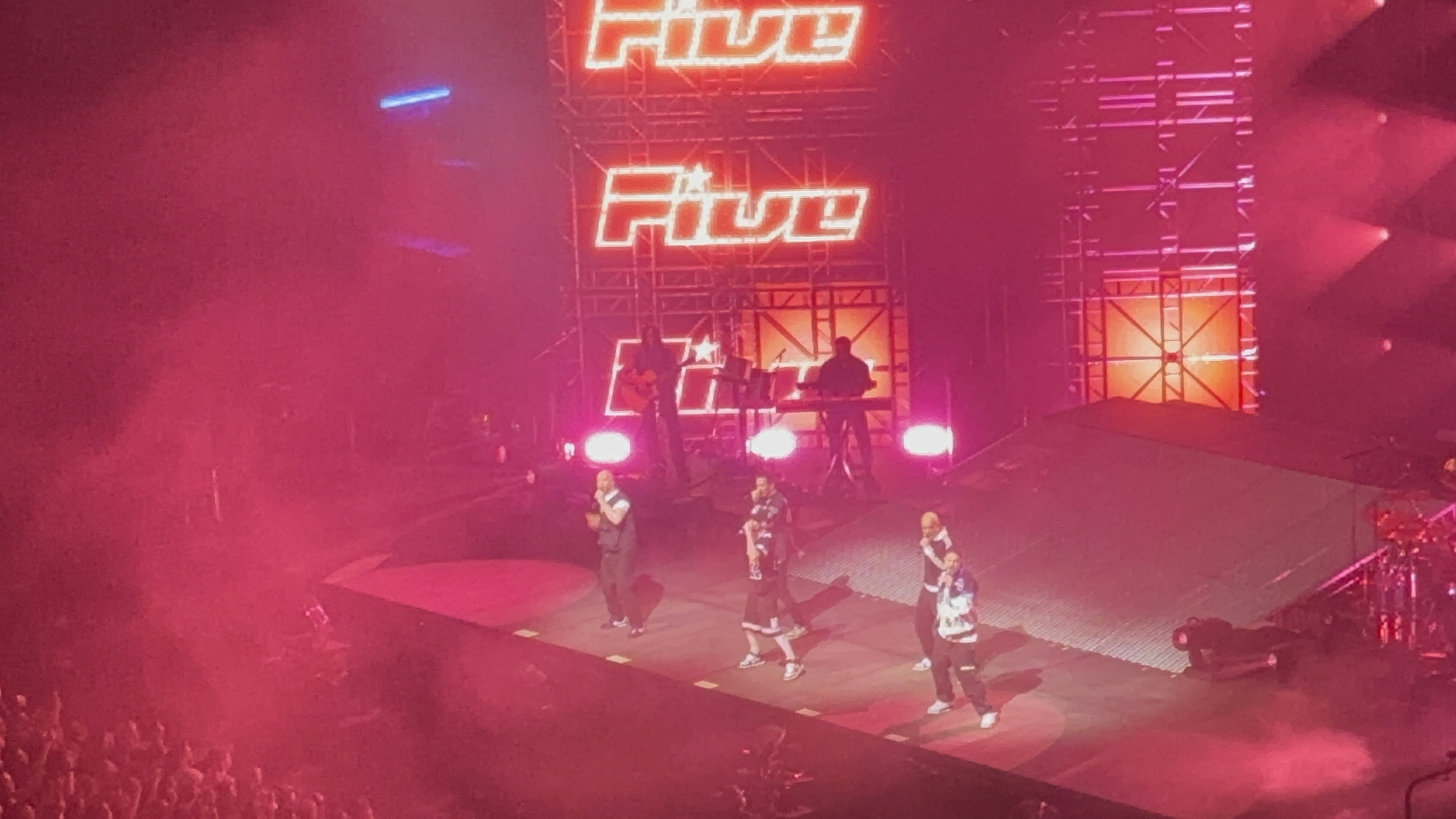
Five, May 2026

=== Netball ===
During the 2018 Suncorp Super Netball season, the main theatre hosted two netball matches, one an intra-city derby between Giants Netball and the New South Wales Swifts and the other between the Giants and the West Coast Fever. Despite not being designed with indoor sport in mind, the theatre was utilised by the league due to a lack of stadium availability elsewhere in the city. The venue has not hosted any further netball, as both clubs have since moved into a permanent multi-purpose facility at the Sydney Olympic Park Tennis Centre.

== See also ==
- Architecture of Sydney
