= Greendale Fault =

Active seismic fault in New Zealand's South Island

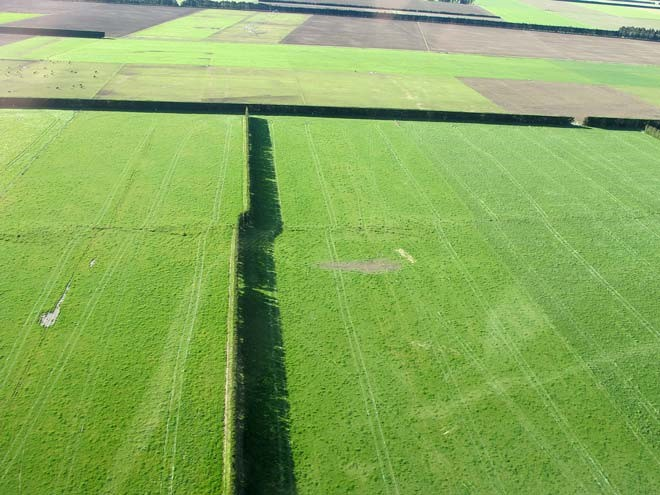
- The Greendale Fault photographed looking north, about 12 hours after the Darfield earthquake. The hedgerow and tractor tire tracks in the paddocks have been horizontally offset by about 3.5 meters
- Country: New Zealand
- Region: Canterbury Plains

Characteristics
- Length: 29.5 km (18.3 mi)
- Displacement: 2 mm (0.079 in)/yr

Tectonics
- Plate: Pacific
- Status: Active
- Earthquakes: 2010 Canterbury earthquake
- Type: Strike-slip fault
- New Zealand Active Fault database

The Greendale Fault is an active seismic fault situated in the Canterbury Plains in New Zealand's South Island. The fault was previously unknown to geologists until 4 September 2010, as physical traces of the fault had been buried by gravel (alluvial deposits) during the last glaciation period.

== Canterbury earthquake ==
A powerful 7.1 magnitude earthquake, occurred on the Greendale Fault at 4:35 am on 4 September 2010 local time (16:35 3 September UTC). The quake caused widespread damage and several power outages, particularly in the city of Christchurch, New Zealand's second largest city.

== Gallery ==
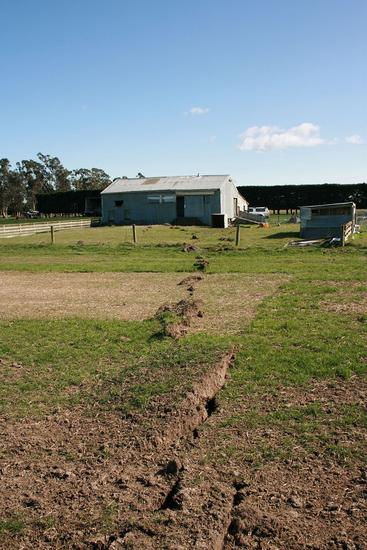
Farm shed at Bluegums Farm, Burnham.

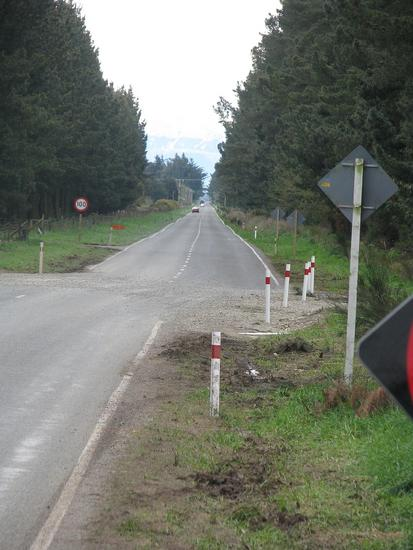
Displacement on Telegraph Road, near the intersection with Clintons Road.

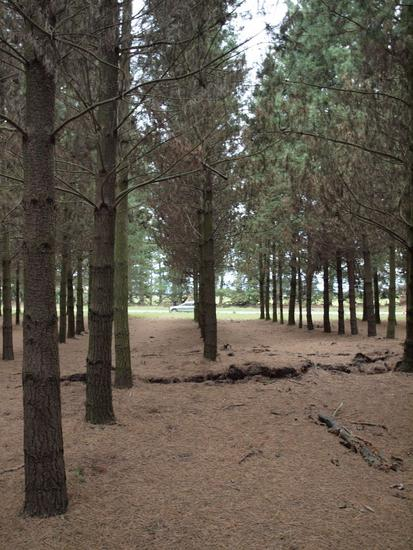
Greendale Fault trace ruptured through pine plantation and displaced tree rows off Telegraph Road.

Highfield Road damaged from the Greendale Fault.
