= Legends Global =

American venue management group

- Type: Private
- Industry: Venue management, entertainment
- Predecessor: SMG, AEG Ogden, AEG Facilities
- Founded: 2019; 7 years ago
- Headquarters: Los Angeles, California, United States
- Area served: Worldwide
- Parent: Legends Hospitality
- Website: legendsglobal.com

Legends Global, formerly ASM Global, is an American worldwide venue management group headquartered in Los Angeles, California, which manages convention centers, music venues, and sports venues. The company was founded in 2019 as a result of a merger between AEG Facilities, AEG Ogden, and SMG.

In August 2024, the company was acquired by Legends Hospitality after Onex Corporation and Anschutz Entertainment Group sold their shares in the company.

== Venue Portfolio ==
The company is responsible for the operation of the following venues globally:

Arenas

- Australia
  - Brisbane Entertainment Centre, Brisbane, QLD
  - Cairns Convention Centre, Cairns, QLD
  - Rod Laver Arena, Melbourne, VIC
- Bahrain
  - Exhibition World Bahrain, Sakhir
- Canada
  - Avenir Centre, Moncton, NB
  - Slush Puppie Place, Kingston, ON
  - Meridian Centre, St.Catharines, ON
  - Canada Games Park, St.Catharines, ON
- Germany
  - Rudolf Weber-Arena, Oberhausen
- Italy
  - Cantù Arena, Cantù
  - ChorusLife Arena, Bergamo
- Japan
  - Aichi International Arena, Nagoya
  - Fukuoka Convention Center, Fukuoka
  - Osaka-jō Hall, Osaka
  - Toyota Arena, Tokyo
- United Kingdom
  - AO Arena, Manchester
  - Connexin Live Arena, Hull
  - Leeds Arena, Leeds
- United States
  - AT&T Stadium, Arlington, TX
  - 1st Summit Arena @ The Cambria County War Memorial, Jonestown, PA
  - Accesso ShoWare Center, Kent, WA
  - Adventist Health Arena, Stockton, CA
  - Altria Theater, Richmond, VA
  - Barclays Center, Brooklyn, NY
  - BMO Center, Rockford, IL
  - Boeing Center at Tech Port, San Antonio, TX
  - Brookshire Grocery Arena, Bossier City, LA
  - Cabarrus Arena, Concord, NC
  - Caesars Superdome, New Orleans, LA
  - Canton Memorial Civic Center, Canton, OH
  - Carlson Center, Fairbanks, AK
  - Coliseo de Puerto Rico, San Juan, Puerto Rico
  - Cowtown Coliseum, Fort Worth, TX
  - DCU Center, Worcester, MA
  - Denny Sanford Premier Center, Sioux Falls, SD
  - Desert Diamond Arena, Glendale, AZ
  - Dominion Energy Center, Richmond, VA
  - Dow Event Center, Saginaw, MI
  - Fiserv Forum, Milwaukee, WI
  - Florence Center, Florence, SC
  - Highmark Stadium, Orchard Park, NY
  - Nassau Coliseum, Uniondale, NY
  - Target Center, Minneapolis, MN
  - T-Mobile Center, Kansas City, MO
  - Huntington Place, Detroit, MI
  - U.S. Bank Stadium, Minneapolis, MN
- Sweden
  - Annexet, Stockholm
  - Avicii Arena, Stockholm
  - Strawberry Arena, Stockholm
  - Hovet, Stockholm
  - 3Arena, Stockholm
  - Södra Teatern, Stockholm
- United Arab Emirates
  - Coca-Cola Arena, Dubai
- Uruguay
  - Antel Arena, Montevideo
