= Canterbury Earthquake Response and Recovery Act 2010 =

Act of Parliament in New Zealand

New Zealand Parliament
- Royal assent: 14 September 2010
- Commenced: 15 September 2010
- Administered by: Ministry of Economic Development

Legislative history
- Introduced by: Hon. Gerry Brownlee
- Passed: 14 September 2010

Repeals
- Canterbury Earthquake Recovery Act 2011
- Status: Repealed

The Canterbury Earthquake Response and Recovery Act 2010 was a New Zealand statute designed to assist reconstruction after the 2010 Canterbury earthquake. It expired in April 2012.

The Act permitted Government ministers to suspend or make exemptions to almost any New Zealand law by Orders in Council, transferring vast lawmaking power from the legislature to the government executive. It passed with unanimous support from all political parties in Parliament, although two of the smaller parties expressed concern over the wide powers it gave ministers. The Act attracted criticism from New Zealand and international academics specialising in constitutional law who claim that it lacks constitutional safeguards and has set a dangerous precedent for future natural disasters. The group of 27 legal academics expressed their concerns in an open letter released on 28 September 2010.

The New Zealand Law Society also expressed concern and suggested Parliament amend the law to ensure the vast powers it confers are not abused. Spokesman Mr Temm said the powers delegated to Ministers “are potentially at odds with maintenance of the principles of the rule of law”.

The Act was repealed on 19 April 2011, when it was replaced with the Canterbury Earthquake Recovery Act 2011.

== See also ==
- List of earthquakes in New Zealand
- Politics of New Zealand
