= Canterbury Earthquake Recovery Act 2011 =

New Zealand Act of Parliament

New Zealand Parliament
- Royal assent: 18 April 2011
- Commenced: 19 April 2011
- Administered by: Canterbury Earthquake Recovery Authority

Legislative history
- Introduced by: Hon. Gerry Brownlee
- Passed: 12 April 2011

Repeals
- Greater Christchurch Regeneration Act 2016
- Status: Repealed

The Canterbury Earthquake Recovery Act 2011 was a New Zealand statute that repealed the Canterbury Earthquake Response and Recovery Act 2010 and set out measures to respond to the impact of the Canterbury earthquakes, and in particular the February 2011 Christchurch earthquake.

== Background ==
=== Earthquakes ===
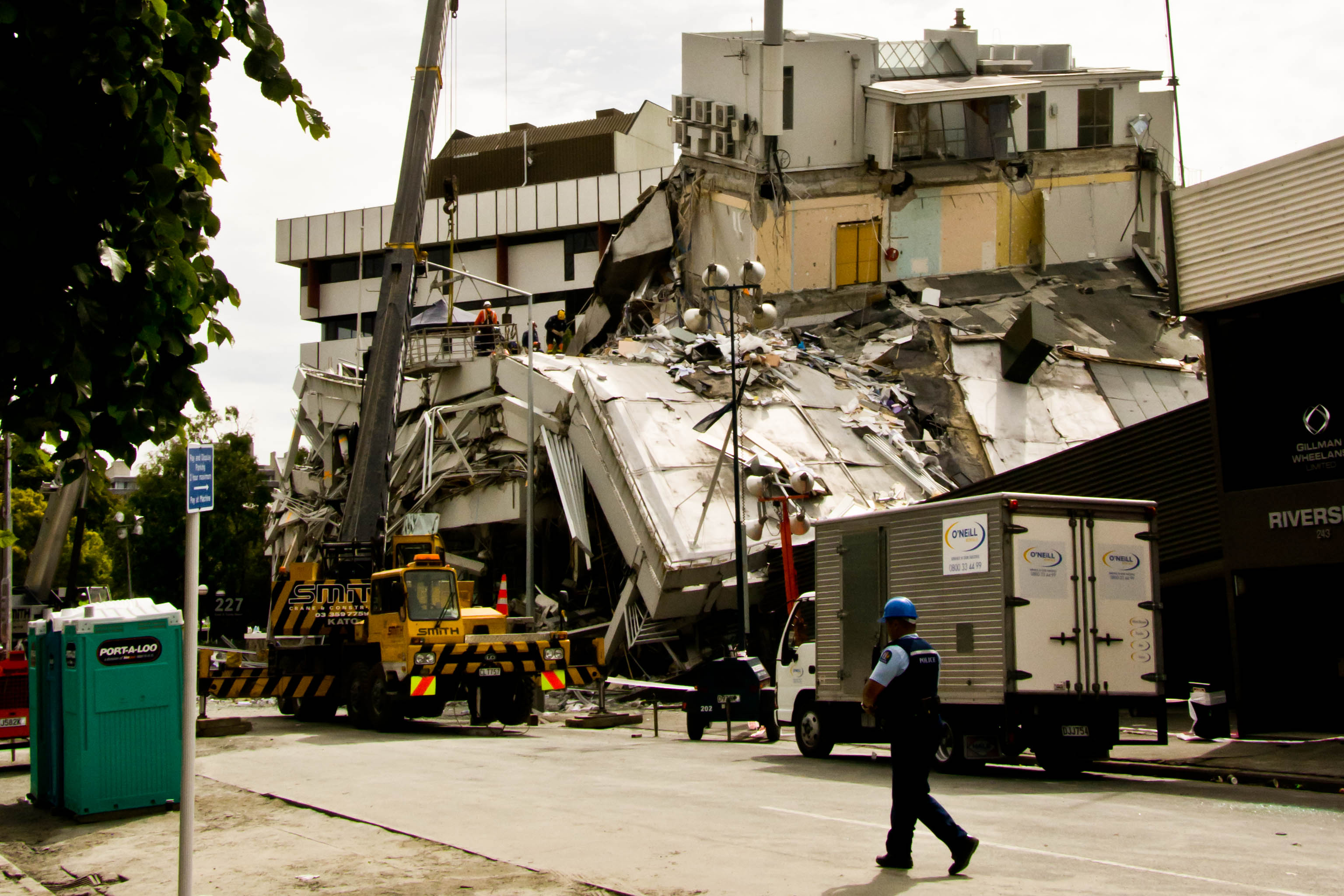
The collapsed PGC Building. Thirty of the building's two hundred workers were trapped within the building following the February earthquake.

On Saturday 4 September 2010, a magnitude 7.1 earthquake struck Christchurch and the central Canterbury region at 4:35 am. Located near Darfield on the Greendale Fault, west of the city at a depth of 10 kilometres (6.2 mi), it caused widespread damage to the city and minor injuries, but no direct fatalities.

Nearly six months later on Tuesday 22 February 2011, a second earthquake measuring magnitude 6.3 struck the city at 12:51 pm. It was located closer to the city, near Lyttelton at a depth of 5 km. Although lower on the moment magnitude scale than the previous earthquake, the intensity and violence of the ground shaking was measured to be MM IX, among the strongest ever recorded globally in an urban area and in total 185 people were killed with nationals from more than 20 countries among the victims. Widespread damage was caused across Christchurch to buildings and infrastructure already weakened by the 4 September 2010 earthquake and its aftershocks. Significant liquefaction affected the eastern suburbs and parts of the central city, and the total cost to insurers of rebuilding has been estimated at NZ$20–30 billion. Due to an older building stock, and many buildings being multi-storey, the central city was hit especially hard.

== Bill history ==
The bill, which was introduced by Hon. Gerry Brownlee of the National Party, had all three readings on 12 April 2011. Members who gave speeches in the first reading were Brownlee, Clayton Cosgrove (Labour), Kate Wilkinson (National), Lianne Dalziel (Labour), Kennedy Graham (Greens), Rahui Katene (Māori), Nicky Wagner (National), Ruth Dyson (Labour), Amy Adams (National), Brendon Burns (Labour), Aaron Gilmore (National), and Jim Anderton (Progressive). All of the opposition speakers voiced their concern about the top-down approach that was prescribed by the bill, and asked for an approach where community input had a stronger emphasis. A party vote was called for, and the first reading had 111 ayes (National, Labour, ACT, Māori, Progressive, and United Future) and 11 noes (Green and the two independents).

In the second reading, Cosgrove was critical of the secrecy around the bill. He claimed that a draft of the bill had been given to Christchurch City Council's solicitor, instructing him that it not be shared with elected members. He stated that submitters to the select committee had less than 24 hours to prepare their submissions.

== Expiry ==
The act was set to expire five years after it commenced.

== See also ==
- List of earthquakes in New Zealand
- Politics of New Zealand
