= Cairns Convention Centre =

Convention center in Carins, Australia

- The Snakepit
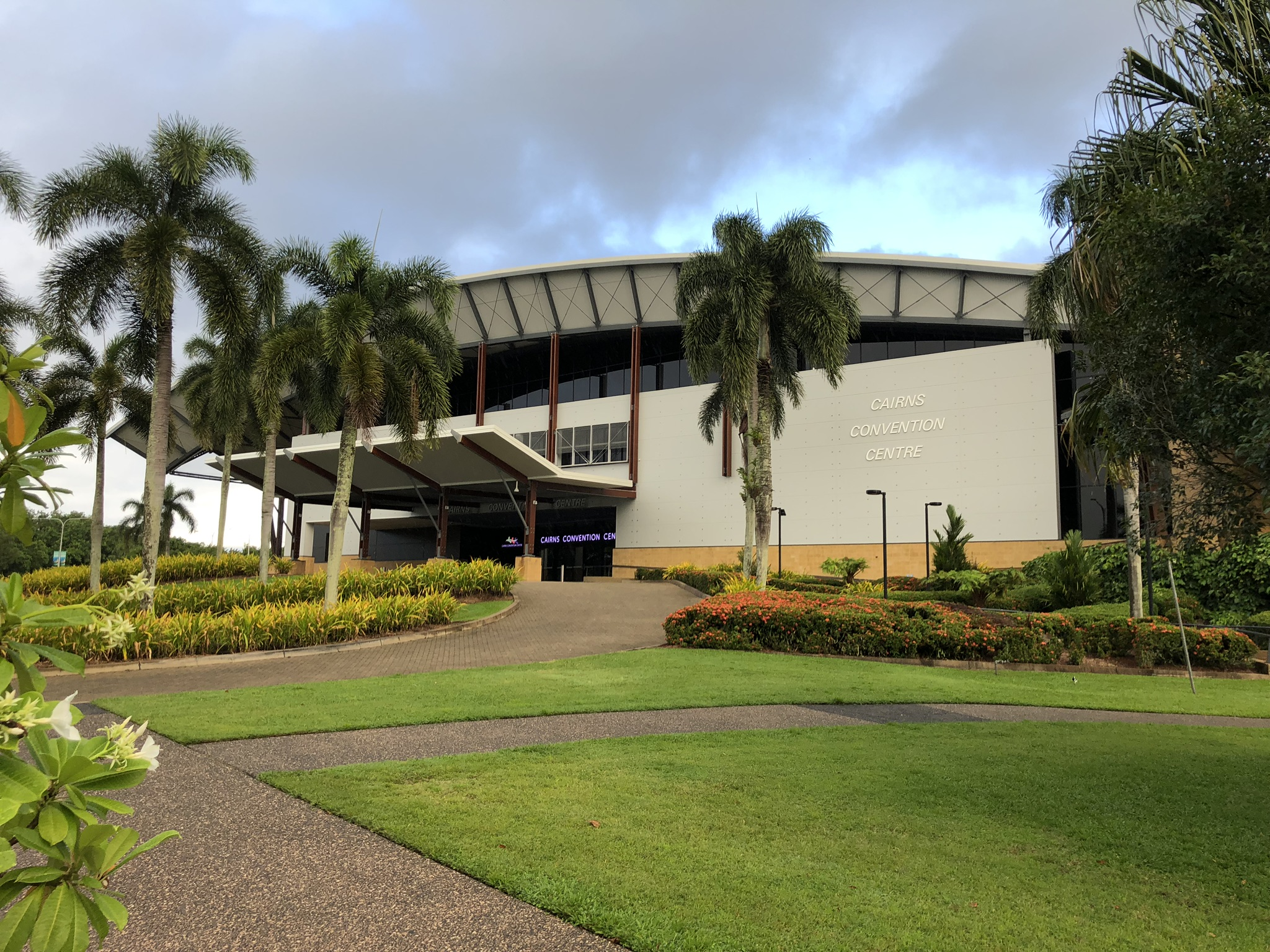
- The entrance of Cairns Convention Centre as viewed from Wharf Street (April 2019)
- Interactive map of Cairns Convention Centre
- Location: Cnr Wharf & Sheridan Streets, Cairns City, Cairns, Queensland, Australia
- Coordinates: 16°55′39″S 145°46′40″E
- Owner: Government of Queensland
- Operator: AEG Ogden
- Capacity: 5,300
- Surface: various
- Record attendance: 5,500 – 3 March 2004, Cairns Taipans vs Perth Wildcats NBL

Construction
- Groundbreaking: 1995
- Opened: 26 June 1996
- Renovated: 2005, 2011
- Expanded: 1999, 2021–2023
- Architect: Cox Architecture

Tenants
- Cairns Taipans (NBL) (1999–present); 2018 Commonwealth Games (Basketball)

The Cairns Convention Centre is a convention and entertainment centre in Cairns City, Cairns, Queensland, Australia. The venue was selected the World's Best Congress Centre in 2004 and 2014.

== Description ==
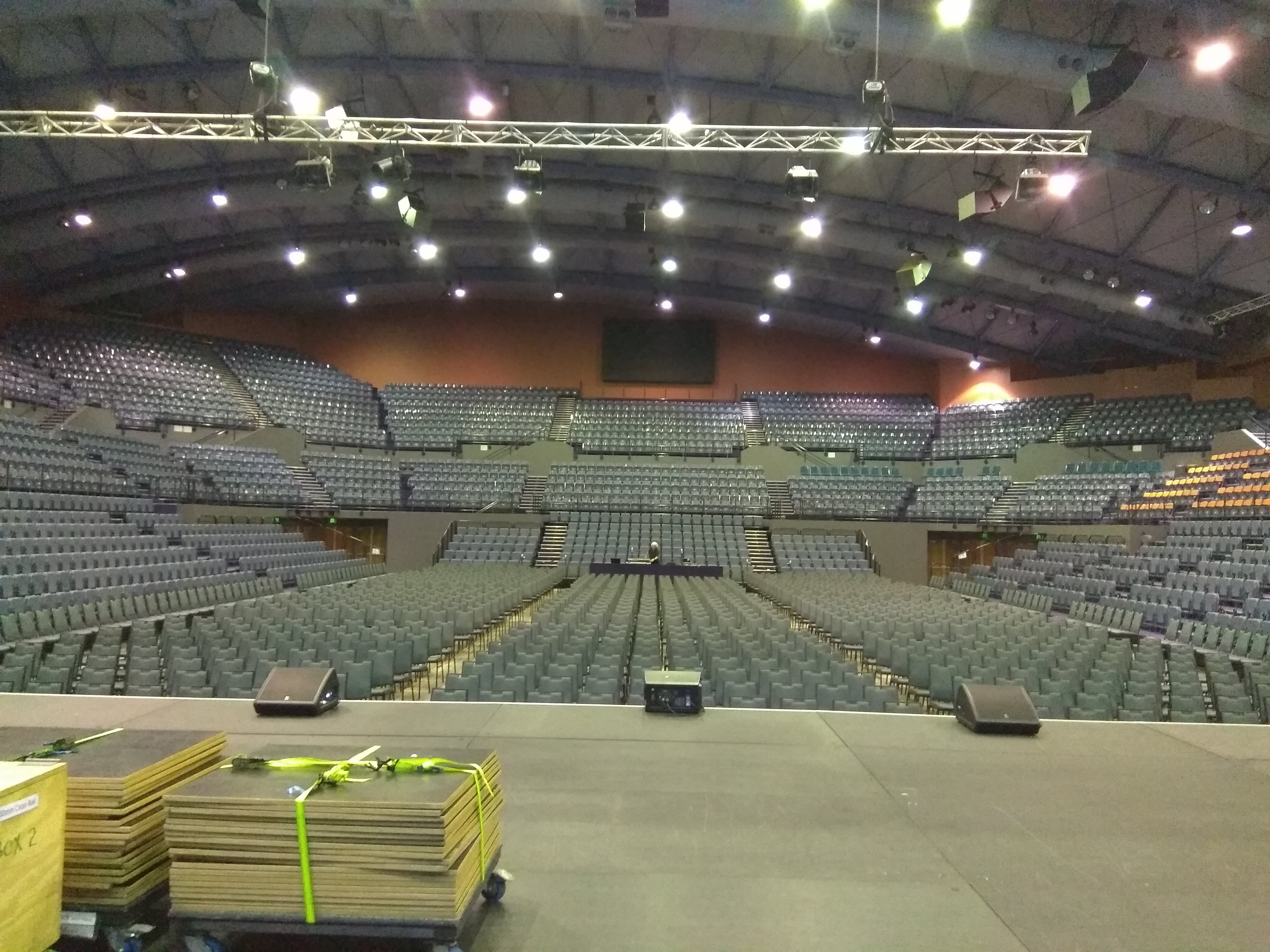
Arena fully-occupied with seating

The centre has a floor space of 31,000 square metres (330,000 sq ft) on a 2.2-hectare (5.4-acre) site in the Cairns CBD, 10 minutes from Cairns Airport. The centre has an auditorium with 2,300 seats, an arena with 5,000 seats, a new plenary that can fit 410, banquet space for 400, 23 meeting rooms and state-of-the art audio visual facilities.

== History ==
The Cairns Convention Centre is owned by the Government of Queensland and has been managed and marketed by AEG Ogden since 1994. Stage one of the building opened on 26 June 1996 and a multi-purpose 5,300-seat hall was added in 1999 by Abigroup. The centre is undergoing another expansion in 2020, adding more meeting space and a third level. It was Australia's first regional convention centre and the country's first environmentally designed public building, and in its opening year it won the inaugural international EIBTM's most environmentally conscious congress centre.

It became home to the Cairns Taipans in 1999, the team's first year in the NBL. The centre undertook a $12 million refurbishment in 2005 and a $6.3 million upgrade in 2011. The current expansion is budgeted to cost $176 million and will be completed in 2022.

== Sport ==
Since the team's inaugural season in 1999, the Cairns Convention Centre has been the home venue for the Cairns Taipans, who play in the National Basketball League. During Taipans home games, the centre is referred to as "The Snakepit".

The Convention Centre hosted preliminary rounds of the men's basketball competition at the 2018 Commonwealth Games, which was held on the Gold Coast.

== Recent events ==
In 2014, the centre hosted the G20 Finance Ministers and Central Bank Governors Meeting and the Australian Tourism Exchange conference, the first time it was held in a regional destination. Also in 2014, it held the World Buiatrics Congress, the 6th International Symposium on Fish Nutrition and Feeding, the Association of Financial Advisers Conference and Congress of the International Union for the Study of Social Insects.

In 2015, it hosted the Professional Bull Riding Cairns Invitational, adding 300 tonnes of sand to the floor of Hall Two, the 25th Meeting of the International Society for Neurochemistry, World Congress on Larynx Cancer, Australasian Hydrographic Symposium, Prostate Cancer World Congress, Toyota Dealer Meeting and Hilux Launch and James Cook University Graduation Ceremonies.

It has been selected to host the 2018 Commonwealth Games basketball heats.

== Awards ==
The Centre received the 2014 and 2004 International Association of Congress Centres (AIPC) APEX Award for World's Best Congress Centre. It was inducted into the Queensland Tourism Awards Hall of Fame after winning gold in the 2013, 2014 and 2015 Business Event Venues category and received the Chairman's Award for Excellence in the Tourism Tropical North Queensland (TTNQ) Industry Excellence Awards. In 2011, it achieved Gold Certification in the AIPC Quality Standards Program.
