= Disputes Tribunals Act 1988 =

Act of Parliament in New Zealand

Disputes Tribunals Act

New Zealand Parliament
- Royal assent: 28 July 1988
- Status: Current legislation

The Disputes Tribunals Act is an Act of Parliament passed in New Zealand in 1988.

The Act replaced the Small Claims Court with the Disputes Tribunal.
