= Liga Nacional de Baloncesto Profesional Femenil =

Professional women's basketball league

National Women's Professional Basketball League
- Current season, competition or edition: 2026 LNBPF season
- Sport: Basketball
- Founded: 2022
- No. of teams: 8
- Country: Mexico
- Headquarters: Mexico City
- Most recent champions: Panteras de Aguascalientes (2nd title)
- Most titles: Panteras de Aguascalientes (2 titles)
- Broadcasters: AYM Sports; Basket América TV; Canal 26; Canal 66; Capital 21; Heraldo Televisión; Hi Sports; Multimedios; Nación Deportes; TV4; TVC Deportes

The Liga Nacional de Baloncesto Profesional Femenil (LNBPF), known for sponsorship reasons as Liga Caliente.mx LNBP Femenil, is a women's professional basketball league in Mexico. Founded in 2022, the league comprises eight teams divided into two regions (North and South) and is the women's counterpart to the Liga Nacional de Baloncesto Profesional (LNBP).

The LNBPF is one of three major professional women's basketball leagues in Mexico, alongside the Liga Mexicana de Baloncesto Profesional Femenil (LMBPF) and the Liga ABC MEX.

== History ==
=== Initial attempt ===
The Liga Nacional de Baloncesto Profesional Femenil (LNBPF) was initially established in 2014 by the executives of the Liga Nacional de Baloncesto Profesional (LNBP). The league started with ten teams, seven of which would eventually depart.

The LNBPF was born as a result of the Mexico men's national basketball team's gold medal at the 2013 Pre-Olympic Tournament and the hosting of the 2011 Pan American Games in Guadalajara. Elsa Flores Sánchez, then-vice president of the Liga Nacional de Desarrollo de Basquetbol Femenil (LIBAFEM), was appointed by the president of the Mexican Olympic Committee (COM) to lead the creation of this professional women's basketball space alongside Juan Manuel González.

In early 2017, following the arrival of Sergio Ganem as president of the National League, a dispute arose among the league's team owners. Ganem envisioned that each men's team would have its own female affiliate, sharing infrastructure and sponsorships without consulting the team owners already in place. This led to the league's division.

After the conflict, the Liga Mexicana de Baloncesto Profesional Femenil (LMBPF) emerged, incorporating former LNBPF teams such as Mieleras de Guanajuato, Lobas de Aguascalientes, Mexcaltecas de Nayarit, Tapatías de Jalisco, Rieleras de Aguascalientes, Gamos de la Universidad Marista, Quetzales Sajoma, Nueceras del Estado de México, Leonas Cenhies, and Bengalíes. Eventually, the LNBPF folded, and the LMBPF grew stronger with the support of its fans and team owners.

=== Rebirth ===
In 2019, Sergio Ganem, President of the LNBP, announced the inclusion of the women's division, which was planned to start in 2020, though this was postponed indefinitely due to the COVID-19 pandemic. In a virtual press conference, Ganem Velázquez officially introduced the first edition of the LNBP Women's Tournament, with eight teams taking part. He announced that the inaugural season would begin on April 23, 2022.

The league started with eight teams, which were divided into two geographical zones. In the Northern Zone, the following teams participated: Abejas de León, Astros de Jalisco, Panteras de Aguascalientes, and Libertadoras de Querétaro. In the Southern Zone, the teams were: Fuerza Regia de Monterrey, Plateras de Fresnillo, Halcones de Xalapa, and Adelitas de Chihuahua.

== Teams ==
2026 LNBPF teams

Team	City	Arena	Capacity	Founded	Joined	Head coach
Abejas de León	León, Guanajuato	Domo de la Feria	4,463	2022		(France) Mélissa Diawakana
Adelitas de Chihuahua	Chihuahua City, Chihuahua	Gimnasio Manuel Bernardo Aguirre	9,600	2022		(Argentina) Santiago Belza
El Calor de Cancún	Cancún, Quintana Roo	Polifórum Benito Juárez	4,800	2025		(Mexico) Giovanni Rivera
Correbasket UAT	Ciudad Victoria, Tamaulipas	Gimnasio Multidisciplinario UAT Victoria	2,600	2023		(Spain) Jordi Vizcaíno
Freseras de Irapuato	Irapuato, Guanajuato	Inforum Irapuato	3,000	2023		(Venezuela) Christopher Gutiérrez
Fuerza Regia de Monterrey	Monterrey, Nuevo León	Arena Mobil	5,000	2022		(Spain) Carlos Alonso
Panteras de Aguascalientes	Aguascalientes City, Aguascalientes	Auditorio Hermanos Carreón	3,000	2022		(Spain) José Antonio Santaella
Santas del Potosí	San Luis Potosí City, San Luis Potosí	Auditorio Miguel Barragán	3,400	2024	2026	(Mexico) Luis García

== Champions ==
Team	Champions	Runners-up	Winning seasons	Runners-up seasons
Panteras de Aguascalientes	2	0	2025, 2026	–
Adelitas de Chihuahua	1	4	2023	2022, 2024, 2025, 2026
Fuerza Regia de Monterrey	1	1	2024	2023
Astros de Jalisco	1	0	2022	–
