= 2022 NBL pre-season =

Pre-season basketball tournament

2022 NBL Blitz logo

The pre-season of the 2022–23 NBL season, the 45th season of Australia's National Basketball League, ran from 9 August 2022 to 6 October 2022. The pre-season also featured the Adelaide 36ers to play games between two NBA teams, this will be the fourth NBLxNBA tour.

On 2 October 2022, the 36ers became the first NBL team to beat an NBA team when they defeated the Phoenix Suns.

== Pre-season games ==
9 August 2022	Melbourne United	67–88	Saint Mary's Gaels	Keilor Stadium, Melbourne
19:30	Scoring by quarter: 18–25, 19–16, 16–26, 14–21
NBL TV	Pts: Ili 18; Rebs: Newley 5 Asts: Duach 3	boxscore report	Pts: Ducas 18; Rebs: Saxen 12; Asts: Bowen 5	Attendance: 1,000

10 August 2022	S.E. Melbourne Phoenix	74–86(OT)	Saint Mary's Gaels	Frankston Stadium, Melbourne
19:00	Scoring by quarter: 29–17, 16–13, 17–23, 9–18, Overtime: 3–15
NBL TV	Pts: Adnam 12; Rebs: Smith-Milner 8 Asts: Adnam 5	boxscore report	Pts: Mahaney 24; Rebs: Ducas 11; Asts: Marciulionis 5	Attendance: 400

3 September 2022	Illawarra Hawks	87–94	UC Riverside Highlanders	Snakepit, Wollongong
18:00	Scoring by quarter: 23–23, 22–26, 21–28, 21–17
NBL TV	Pts: Harvey 24; Rebs: Froling 7 Asts: Harvey, Robinson 3	boxscore report	Pts: Olbrich 19; Rebs: Olbrich 10; Asts: Pullin 8	Attendance: 1,500

6 September 2022	Tasmania JackJumpers	88–83	S.E. Melbourne Phoenix	Ulverstone Sports & Leisure Centre, Ulverstone
18:30	Scoring by quarter: 24–18, 16–14, 31–22, 17–29
NBL TV	Pts: Kelly 20; Rebs: Kenyon 6 Asts: Magette 6	boxscore report	Pts: Williams 15; Rebs: Anticevich 8 Asts: Browne, Kell 4	Attendance: 1,100

8 September 2022	Tasmania JackJumpers	84–80	S.E. Melbourne Phoenix	Elphin Sports Centre, Launceston
18:30	Scoring by quarter: 23–26, 21–23, 19–18, 21–13
NBL TV	Pts: Doyle 17; Rebs: Kelly, Kenyon 5 Asts: Magette 6	boxscore report	Pts: Adnam 15; Rebs: Pineau 8 Asts: Browne 4	Attendance: 1,100

8 September 2022	Melbourne United	77–105	Brisbane Bullets	Selkirk Stadium, Wendouree
19:00	Scoring by quarter: 16–26, 27–34, 8–19, 26–26
NBL TV	Pts: Tucker 20; Rebs: Tucker 8 Asts: Rathan-Mayes 4	boxscore report	Pts: Walker 18; Rebs: Froling 9 Asts: Mitchell 6	Attendance: 2,000

9 September 2022	Perth Wildcats	98–87	Adelaide 36ers	Eaton Recreration Centre, Bunbury
18:30	Scoring by quarter: 24–18, 23–30, 30–17, 21–22
NBL TV	Pts: Cotton 20; Rebs: Travers 9 Asts: Norton 6	boxscore report	Pts: Cleveland 23; Rebs: Sotto 11; Asts: Marshall, Randall 4	Attendance: 300

10 September 2022	New Zealand Breakers	71–68(OT)	Illawarra Hawks	The Stockyard, Pukekohe
18:00	Scoring by quarter: 14–22, 23–9, 19–19, 8–14, Overtime: 7–4
NBL TV	Pts: Le'afa 16; Rebs: Pardon 12; Asts: McDowell-White 5	boxscore report	Pts: Robinson 26; Rebs: Deng 15; Asts: Froling 3	Attendance: 600

10 September 2022	Melbourne United	72–76	Brisbane Bullets	Casey Stadium, Melbourne
19:00	Scoring by quarter: 22–18, 20–23, 13–26, 17–9
NBL TV	Pts: Tucker 28; Rebs: Tucker 9 Asts: Newley 2	boxscore report	Pts: Walker 17; Rebs: Gak 9 Asts: Bach 4	Attendance: 1,500

11 September 2022	Perth Wildcats	97–91	Adelaide 36ers	HBF Arena, Joondalup
13:00	Scoring by quarter: 34–25, 29–20, 20–25, 14–21
NBL TV	Pts: Manek 15; Rebs: Webster 6 Asts: Cotton 5	boxscore report	Pts: Randall 29; Rebs: Cleveland 9 Asts: McCarron 6	Attendance: 500

2 October 2022	Adelaide 36ers	134–124	Phoenix Suns	Footprint Center, Phoenix
19:00	Scoring by quarter: 33–28, 38–31, 25–31, 38–34
NBL TV	Pts: Randall 35; Rebs: McCarron 9 Asts: McCarron 16	boxscore report	Pts: Payne 23; Rebs: Bridges 7 Asts: Paul 12	Attendance: 15,152

6 October 2022	Adelaide 36ers	98–131	Oklahoma City Thunder	Paycom Center, Oklahoma City
19:00	Scoring by quarter: 16–35, 27–38, 27–35, 28–23
NBL TV	Pts: Randall 27; Rebs: Franks 7 Asts: Randall 8	boxscore report	Pts: Mann 26; Rebs: Williams 12; Asts: Giddey, Williams 6	Attendance: TBA

== NBL Blitz ==
The 2022 NBL Blitz is an annual pre-season tournament featuring all NBL teams. This season games were held in Darwin, Northern Territory from the 16th to the 23rd of September 2022.

=== Blitz ladder ===
Pos	Team	Pld	W	L	PF	PA	PP	BP	Pts
1	Adelaide 36ers (C)	3	3	0	255	232	109.9	8	17
2	Melbourne United	3	2	1	238	211	112.8	8.5	14.5
3	Perth Wildcats	3	2	1	248	241	102.9	7	13
4	Tasmania JackJumpers	3	2	1	252	221	114.0	6.5	12.5
5	Illawarra Hawks	3	2	1	243	233	104.3	6.5	12.5
6	Brisbane Bullets	3	2	1	225	225	100.0	6	12
7	Sydney Kings	3	2	1	245	245	100.0	5.5	11.5
8	New Zealand Breakers	3	0	3	243	267	91.0	5	5
9	Cairns Taipans	3	0	3	237	275	86.2	4	4
10	S.E. Melbourne Phoenix	3	0	3	226	262	86.3	3	3

Updated to match(es) played on 23 September 2022. Source: nblblitz.com.au
(C) Champions

16 September 2022	S.E. Melbourne Phoenix	76–84	Adelaide 36ers	Darwin Basketball Facility, Darwin
20:00	Scoring by quarter: 20–21, 13–18, 20–24, 23–21
Kayo Freebies	Pts: Adnam 19; Rebs: Williams 7 Asts: Adnam 4	boxscore report	Pts: Randall 16; Rebs: McCarron 8 Asts: McCarron 5	Attendance: not available

17 September 2022	Tasmania JackJumpers	73–53	Sydney Kings	Darwin Basketball Facility, Darwin
17:30	Scoring by quarter: 12–13, 22–22, 14–11, 25–7
Kayo Freebies	Pts: McVeigh 16; Rebs: Kenyon 9 Asts: Magette 5	boxscore report	Pts: Walton 12; Rebs: Noi 10; Asts: Walton 4	Attendance: 916

17 September 2022	Perth Wildcats	98–80	Cairns Taipans	Darwin Basketball Facility, Darwin
20:00	Scoring by quarter: 24–27, 25–20, 20–19, 29–14
Kayo Freebies	Pts: Cotton 36; Rebs: Blanchfield, Travers 7 Asts: Cotton 4	boxscore report	Pts: Pinder 21; Rebs: McCall 8 Asts: McCall 6	Attendance: 916

18 September 2022	Brisbane Bullets	81–69	New Zealand Breakers	Darwin Basketball Facility, Darwin
17:30	Scoring by quarter: 18–28, 25–9, 19–16, 19–16
Kayo Freebies	Pts: Baynes, Johnson 14; Rebs: Gak 8 Asts: Gak 6	boxscore report	Pts: Vodanovich 15; Rebs: Brantley 8 Asts: Le'afa 4	Attendance: 932

18 September 2022	Illawarra Hawks	81–68	Melbourne United	Darwin Basketball Facility, Darwin
20:00	Scoring by quarter: 20–20, 27–18, 23–13, 11–17
Kayo Freebies	Pts: Froling, Robinson 14; Rebs: Froling 8 Asts: Robinson 8	boxscore report	Pts: Tucker 20; Rebs: Hukporti 8 Asts: Tucker 3	Attendance: 922

19 September 2022	Adelaide 36ers	87–79	Tasmania JackJumpers	Darwin Basketball Facility, Darwin
17:30	Scoring by quarter: 27–22, 21–23, 23–19, 16–15
Kayo Freebies	Pts: Cleveland 27; Rebs: Dech 9 Asts: Cleveland, Dech, McCarron 3	boxscore report	Pts: McVeigh 16; Rebs: Kelly, Kenyon 5 Asts: Magette 7	Attendance: 838

19 September 2022	Perth Wildcats	87–71	S.E. Melbourne Phoenix	Darwin Basketball Facility, Darwin
20:00	Scoring by quarter: 21–16, 25–22, 19–14, 22–19
Kayo Freebies	Pts: Webster 16; Rebs: Manek 9 Asts: Cotton 5	boxscore report	Pts: Adnam 16; Rebs: Williams 11; Asts: Browne 8	Attendance: 838

20 September 2022	New Zealand Breakers	81–85	Illawarra Hawks	Darwin Basketball Facility, Darwin
17:30	Scoring by quarter: 10–27, 23–17, 23–15, 25–26
Kayo Freebies	Pts: Rupert 17; Rebs: Pardon 9 Asts: Le'afa 9	boxscore report	Pts: Harvey 27; Rebs: Froling 7 Asts: Robinson 8	Attendance: 660

20 September 2022	Cairns Taipans	76–77	Brisbane Bullets	Darwin Basketball Facility, Darwin
20:00	Scoring by quarter: 29–21, 14–25, 11–12, 22–19
Kayo Freebies	Pts: Kuol 21; Rebs: Davey 8 Asts: McCall 4	boxscore report	Pts: Walker 16; Rebs: Baynes 9 Asts: Johnson, Walker 3	Attendance: 660

21 September 2022	Sydney Kings	91–79	S.E. Melbourne Phoenix	Darwin Basketball Facility, Darwin
17:30	Scoring by quarter: 22–27, 24–14, 14–19, 31–19
Kayo Freebies	Pts: Walton 15; Rebs: Cooka 5 Asts: Bayles 4	boxscore report	Pts: Adnam 24; Rebs: Madut 8 Asts: Adnam 5	Attendance: 917

21 September 2022	Melbourne United	90–63	Perth Wildcats	Darwin Basketball Facility, Darwin
20:00	Scoring by quarter: 21–11, 27–19, 25–17, 17–16
Kayo Freebies	Pts: Rathan-Mayes 22; Rebs: Caroline 14; Asts: Caroline, Humphries, Tucker 3	boxscore report	Pts: Thomas, Webster 10; Rebs: Cotton 7 Asts: Travers 4	Attendance: 917

22 September 2022	Tasmania JackJumpers	100–81	Cairns Taipans	Darwin Basketball Facility, Darwin
17:30	Scoring by quarter: 25–16, 31–20, 19–32, 25–13
Kayo Freebies	Pts: McVeigh 25; Rebs: White 8 Asts: Doyle, Magette 4	boxscore report	Pts: Ayre 26; Rebs: Davey 7 Asts: Ayre, Davey, Đerić, Scott 2	Attendance: 912

22 September 2022	Illawarra Hawks	77–84	Adelaide 36ers	Darwin Basketball Facility, Darwin
20:00	Scoring by quarter: 26–17, 26–20, 13–27, 12–20
Kayo Freebies	Pts: King 20; Rebs: Deng, King 8 Asts: Harvey, White 4	boxscore report	Pts: Franks 30; Rebs: Johnson 11; Asts: Dech 7	Attendance: 912

23 September 2022	New Zealand Breakers	93–101	Sydney Kings	Darwin Basketball Facility, Darwin
17:30	Scoring by quarter: 24–33, 20–26, 27–21, 22–21
Kayo Freebies	Pts: Brown 19; Rebs: Pardon, Rupert 5 Asts: Brown, Le'afa 4	boxscore report	Pts: Soares 19; Rebs: Cooks 9 Asts: Makoi 4	Attendance: 905

23 September 2022	Melbourne United	80–67	Brisbane Bullets	Darwin Basketball Facility, Darwin
20:00	Scoring by quarter: 19–22, 19–13, 21–14, 21–18
Kayo Freebies	Pts: Goulding 19; Rebs: Tucker 8 Asts: Rathan-Mayes 4	boxscore report	Pts: Krebs 21; Rebs: Froling 7 Asts: Bach, Johnson 3	Attendance: 906

=== Awards ===
- Loggins-Bruton Cup: Adelaide 36ers
- Most Valuable Player (Ray Borner Medal): Jack McVeigh (Tasmania JackJumpers)
