= 2022–23 Brisbane Bullets season =

Australian basketball club season

- Head coach: (Australia) Greg Vanderjagt
- Captain: (Australia) Aron Baynes
- Arena: Nissan Arena

NBL results
- Record: 8–20 (28.6%)
- Ladder: 9th
- Finals finish: Did not qualify
- Stats at NBL.com.au

Player records
- Points: (United States) Johnson 15.8
- Rebounds: (Australia) Baynes 7.8
- Assists: (Australia) Sobey 4.7
- All statistics correct as of 4 February 2023.

The 2022–23 Brisbane Bullets season was the 37th season of the franchise in the National Basketball League (NBL).

On 25 November 2022, James Duncan was released as Bullets' head coach after the team started the season with a 3–6 record and was replaced by Sam Mackinnon on an interim basis. On 13 December 2022, Greg Vanderjagt was elevated to the Bullets' interim head coach. Ten days later, he was confirmed as the Bullets' head coach for the rest of the 2022–23 NBL season.

== Roster ==
Note: Flags indicate national team eligibility at FIBA-sanctioned events. Players may hold other non-FIBA nationalities not displayed.

2022–23 Brisbane Bullets roster
Players
Coaches

Pos.	No.	Nat.	Name	Ht.	Wt.
F	0	(Australia)	Mitchell, D. J.	2.03 m (6 ft 8 in)	106 kg (234 lb)
C	1	(Australia)	Gak, Gorjok	2.11 m (6 ft 11 in)	102 kg (225 lb)
G	2	(South Sudan)	Diing, Lual	2.05 m (6 ft 9 in)	90 kg (198 lb)
F	3	(United States)	White, Andrew (I)	2.01 m (6 ft 7 in)	95 kg (209 lb)
G	5	(Australia)	Cadee, Jason (injured)	1.86 m (6 ft 1 in)	84 kg (185 lb)
F	6	(Australia)	Stattmann, Kody	2.02 m (6 ft 8 in)	101 kg (223 lb)
G	8	(United States)	Johnson, Tyler (I)	1.91 m (6 ft 3 in)	88 kg (194 lb)
G	9	(Australia)	Sapwell, Koen	1.93 m (6 ft 4 in)	83 kg (183 lb)
C	11	(Australia)	Froling, Harry (injured)	2.10 m (6 ft 11 in)	123 kg (271 lb)
C	12	(Australia)	Baynes, Aron (C)	2.08 m (6 ft 10 in)	118 kg (260 lb)
G	17	(Australia)	Krebs, Tanner (injured)	1.98 m (6 ft 6 in)	95 kg (209 lb)
G	18	(Denmark)	Bach, Rasmus	1.93 m (6 ft 4 in)	84 kg (185 lb)
G	20	(Australia)	Sobey, Nathan	1.90 m (6 ft 3 in)	82 kg (181 lb)
C	24	(New Zealand)	Harrison, Tyrell	2.14 m (7 ft 0 in)	115 kg (254 lb)
F	32	(Australia)	Johns, Matt (DP)	2.03 m (6 ft 8 in)	104 kg (229 lb)
G	44	(Australia)	Clarke, Hunter (DP)	1.96 m (6 ft 5 in)	84 kg (185 lb)

Head coach

- (Australia) Greg Vanderjagt

Assistant coach(es)

- (New Zealand) Pero Cameron
- (Australia) Peter Crawford

Legend

- (C) Team captain
- (DP) Development player
- (IN) Inactive
- (I) Import player
- (TP) Training player
- (SRP) Special restricted player
- (NS) Next Star player
- Injured

- Roster
Updated: 26 January 2023

== Standings ==
=== Ladder ===
Pos	2022–23 NBL season											
Pos	Team	Pld	W	L	PCT	Last 5	Streak	Home	Away	PF	PA	PP
1	Sydney Kings	28	19	9	67.86%	2–3	L2	10–4	9–5	2679	2468	108.55%
2	New Zealand Breakers	28	18	10	64.29%	5–0	W5	7–7	11–3	2423	2246	107.88%
3	Cairns Taipans	28	18	10	64.29%	2–3	W1	8–6	10–4	2455	2376	103.32%
4	Tasmania JackJumpers	28	16	12	57.14%	3–2	W2	7–7	9–5	2385	2305	103.47%
5	S.E. Melbourne Phoenix	28	15	13	53.57%	3–2	L1	11–3	4–10	2553	2512	101.63%
6	Perth Wildcats	28	15	13	53.57%	2–3	W1	9–5	6–8	2580	2568	100.47%
7	Melbourne United	28	15	13	53.57%	4–1	W1	8–6	7–7	2434	2424	100.41%
8	Adelaide 36ers	28	13	15	46.43%	2–3	L1	8–6	5–9	2546	2597	98.04%
9	Brisbane Bullets	28	8	20	28.57%	2–3	L3	4–10	4–10	2365	2600	90.96%
10	Illawarra Hawks	28	3	25	10.71%	1–4	L4	2–12	1–13	2261	2585	87.47%

Updated to match(es) played on 5 February 2023. Source: NBL.com.au

The NBL tie-breaker system as outlined in the NBL Rules and Regulations states that in the case of an identical win–loss record, the overall points percentage will determine order of seeding.

=== Ladder progression ===
Leader and qualification to semifinals
Qualification to semifinals
Qualification to play-in games
Last place

2022–23 NBL season
Team ╲ Round	1	2	3	4	5	6	7	8	9	10	11	12	13	14	15	16	17	18
Adelaide 36ers	—	—	7	4	8	8	7	6	6	7	7	7	7	5	8	8	8	8
Brisbane Bullets	9	9	10	9	9	9	9	9	8	9	9	9	9	9	9	9	9	9
Cairns Taipans	1	3	4	3	4	3	3	3	3	4	3	4	3	3	2	2	2	3
Illawarra Hawks	7	6	9	10	10	10	10	10	10	10	10	10	10	10	10	10	10	10
Melbourne United	5	5	6	8	6	6	8	8	9	8	8	8	8	8	6	7	7	7
New Zealand Breakers	6	4	3	2	1	2	2	1	2	2	1	2	2	2	3	3	3	2
Perth Wildcats	2	1	2	5	7	7	5	7	7	6	5	6	5	7	5	5	5	6
S.E. Melbourne Phoenix	4	7	8	7	3	4	4	4	4	3	4	3	4	6	7	6	6	5
Sydney Kings	3	2	1	1	2	1	1	2	1	1	2	1	1	1	1	1	1	1
Tasmania JackJumpers	8	8	5	6	5	5	6	5	5	5	6	5	6	4	4	4	4	4

Updated to match(es) played on 5 February 2023. Source: NBL.com.au

== Game log ==
=== Pre-season ===
2022 pre-season game log
Total: 2–0 (Home: 0–0; Road: 2–0)
September: 2–0 (Home: 0–0; Road: 2–0)

Game	Date	Team	Score	High points	High rebounds	High assists	Location Attendance	Record
1	8 September	@ Melbourne	W 77–105	Devondrick Walker (18)	Harry Froling (9)	D. J. Mitchell (6)	Selkirk Stadium; 2,000	1–0
2	10 September	@ Melbourne	W 72–76	Devondrick Walker (17)	Gorjok Gak (9)	Rasmus Bach (4)	Casey Stadium; 1,500	2–0

=== NBL Blitz ===
2022 NBL Blitz game log
Total: 2–1 (Home: 1–0; Road: 1–1)
September: 2–1 (Home: 1–0; Road: 1–1)

Game	Date	Team	Score	High points	High rebounds	High assists	Location Attendance	Record
1	18 September	New Zealand	W 81–69	Baynes, Johnson (14)	Gorjok Gak (8)	Gorjok Gak (6)	Darwin Basketball Facility; 932	1–0
2	20 September	@ Cairns	W 76–77	Devondrick Walker (16)	Aron Baynes (9)	Johnson, Walker (3)	Darwin Basketball Facility; 660	2–0
3	23 September	@ Melbourne	L 80–67	Tanner Krebs (21)	Harry Froling (7)	Bach, Johnson (3)	Darwin Basketball Facility; 906	2–1

=== Regular season ===
2022–23 game log
Total: 8–20 (Home: 4–10; Road: 4–10)
October: 2–5 (Home: 1–1; Road: 1–4)

Game	Date	Team	Score	High points	High rebounds	High assists	Location Attendance	Record
1	2 October	@ Perth	L 87–73	Devondrick Walker (16)	Aron Baynes (7)	Jason Cadee (6)	RAC Arena; 11,083	0–1
2	7 October	@ Sydney	L 100–90	Baynes, Cadee (16)	Aron Baynes (9)	Tanner Krebs (5)	Qudos Bank Arena; 11,478	0–2
3	9 October	@ Tasmania	L 90–86 (OT)	Tyler Johnson (24)	Aron Baynes (6)	D. J. Mitchell (4)	MyState Bank Arena; 4,231	0–3
4	16 October	Sydney	L 85–102	D. J. Mitchell (20)	D. J. Mitchell (10)	Nathan Sobey (8)	Nissan Arena; 4,797	0–4
5	22 October	@ S.E. Melbourne	L 89–88	Jason Cadee (21)	Tyrell Harrison (8)	Cadee, Sobey (5)	John Cain Arena; 5,432	0–5
6	24 October	@ Illawarra	W 56–82	Aron Baynes (17)	Aron Baynes (14)	Nathan Sobey (7)	WIN Entertainment Centre; 2,011	1–5
7	27 October	Illawarra	W 86–61	Nathan Sobey (22)	Aron Baynes (14)	Nathan Sobey (5)	Nissan Arena; 2,583	2–5

November: 1–2 (Home: 0–1; Road: 1–1)

Game	Date	Team	Score	High points	High rebounds	High assists	Location Attendance	Record
8	5 November	@ Tasmania	W 72–74	Aron Baynes (16)	Baynes, Mitchell (9)	Nathan Sobey (7)	MyState Bank Arena; 4,231	3–5
9	19 November	Cairns	L 82–90	D. J. Mitchell (21)	Aron Baynes (11)	Tyler Johnson (4)	Nissan Arena; 4,401	3–6
10	27 November	@ New Zealand	L 116–79	Tanner Krebs (19)	Gorjok Gak (6)	Nathan Sobey (10)	Spark Arena; 3,660	3–7

December: 2–6 (Home: 2–2; Road: 0–4)

Game	Date	Team	Score	High points	High rebounds	High assists	Location Attendance	Record
11	1 December	Perth	W 106–95 (OT)	Nathan Sobey (28)	Harry Froling (13)	Jason Cadee (8)	Nissan Arena; 2,427	4–7
12	4 December	Tasmania	L 84–99	Nathan Sobey (20)	Gorjok Gak (9)	Cadee, Sobey (5)	Nissan Arena; 3,811	4–8
13	10 December	@ Melbourne	L 104–88	Nathan Sobey (24)	Gak, Mitchell (6)	Jason Cadee (5)	John Cain Arena; 5,788	4–9
14	14 December	@ Cairns	L 85–76	Aron Baynes (17)	Gorjok Gak (11)	Jason Cadee (8)	Cairns Convention Centre; 3,497	4–10
15	17 December	@ Adelaide	L 108–77	Jason Cadee (18)	Aron Baynes (11)	Nathan Sobey (8)	Adelaide Entertainment Centre; 6,003	4–11
–	21 December	New Zealand	Postponed (COVID-19) (Makeup date: 4 February)					
16	21 December	S.E. Melbourne	L 77–104	Nathan Sobey (31)	Aron Baynes (8)	Jason Cadee (7)	Nissan Arena; 3,375	4–12
17	27 December	Perth	W 97–93 (OT)	Nathan Sobey (30)	Aron Baynes (10)	Nathan Sobey (9)	Nissan Arena; 3,737	5–12
18	29 December	@ Adelaide	L 87–84	Nathan Sobey (24)	Aron Baynes (12)	Cadee, Froling (3)	Adelaide Entertainment Centre; 9,263	5–13

January: 3–6 (Home: 1–5; Road: 2–1)

Game	Date	Team	Score	High points	High rebounds	High assists	Location Attendance	Record
19	1 January	Melbourne	L 86–99	Gorjok Gak (18)	Gorjok Gak (13)	Nathan Sobey (4)	Nissan Arena; 4,781	5–14
20	5 January	Cairns	L 81–107	Tyler Johnson (32)	Gorjok Gak (7)	Tyler Johnson (4)	Nissan Arena; 4,258	5–15
21	11 January	Sydney	L 67–116	Nathan Sobey (14)	Aron Baynes (7)	Jason Cadee (4)	Nissan Arena; 4,068	5–16
22	14 January	Melbourne	L 91–101	Aron Baynes (21)	Aron Baynes (11)	Nathan Sobey (6)	Nissan Arena; 4,703	5–17
23	16 January	@ S.E. Melbourne	W 79–84	Jason Cadee (28)	Froling, Mitchell (5)	Cadee, Froling, Mitchell (3)	State Basketball Centre; 3,333	6–17
24	19 January	Adelaide	W 106–101 (OT)	Tyler Johnson (27)	Aron Baynes (11)	Nathan Sobey (6)	Nissan Arena; 3,953	7–17
25	21 January	@ Illawarra	W 86–103	Tyler Johnson (23)	Harry Froling (9)	Nathan Sobey (6)	WIN Entertainment Centre; 3,503	8–17
26	26 January	New Zealand	L 71–99	Tyler Johnson (20)	Baynes, Johnson, Sobey (5)	Nathan Sobey (8)	Nissan Arena; 3,636	8–18
27	28 January	@ Cairns	L 94–87	Nathan Sobey (27)	D. J. Mitchell (8)	Tyler Johnson (7)	Cairns Convention Centre; 4,437	8–19

February: 0–1 (Home: 0–1; Road: 0–0)

Game	Date	Team	Score	High points	High rebounds	High assists	Location Attendance	Record
–	4 February	S.E. Melbourne	Postponed (COVID-19) (Makeup date: 21 December)					
28	4 February	New Zealand	L 75–80 (OT)	Aron Baynes (17)	D. J. Mitchell (8)	Gorjok Gak (4)	Nissan Arena; 5,253	8–20

2022–23 season schedule

== Transactions ==
=== Re-signed ===
Player	Signed
Nathan Sobey	27 April
Tanner Krebs	13 June

=== Additions ===
Player	Signed	Former team
Kody Stattmann	27 May	Virginia Cavaliers
Harry Froling	28 May	Illawarra Hawks
D. J. Mitchell	8 June	Basketball Academie Limburg
Lual Diing	20 June	Northside Wizards
Gorjok Gak	6 July	ČEZ Nymburk
Aron Baynes	28 July	Detroit Pistons
Tyler Johnson	30 July	San Antonio Spurs
Devondrick Walker	5 September	Rockingham Flames
Rasmus Bach	7 September	New Zealand Breakers
Matt Johns	15 September	Geelong Supercats
Hunter Clarke	6 October	Willetton Tigers
Koen Sapwell	4 December	S.E. Melbourne Phoenix
Andrew White	11 December	Büyükçekmece Basketbol

=== Subtractions ===
Player	Reason left	New team
Anthony Drmic	Mutual option	Adelaide 36ers
Deng Deng	Free agent	Illawarra Hawks
Max Mackinnon	Collage	Elon Phoenix
Robert Franks	Free agent	Adelaide 36ers
Chuanxing Liu	Free agent	Bay Area Dragons
Jack Salt	Free agent	Hawke's Bay Hawks
Lamar Patterson	Free agent	Gold Coast Rollers
Devondrick Walker	Released	N/A

== Awards ==
=== Club awards ===
- Players Player: Tyler Johnson
- Members MVP: Tyler Johnson
- St Genevieve Partners Choice Award: Jason Cadee
- Defensive Player of the Year: Aron Baynes
- Youth Player of the Year: Matt Johns
- Narelle Kelly Award: Susannah Walmsley
- Club MVP: Nathan Sobey

== See also ==
- 2022–23 NBL season
- Brisbane Bullets
