= 2015 FIBA Americas League =

FIBA Americas League
- Duration: January 16 – March 15, 2015
- Teams: 16

Finals
- Champions: (Brazil) Bauru (1st title)
- Runners-up: (Mexico) Pioneros de Quintana Roo
- Third place: (Brazil) Flamengo
- Fourth place: (Argentina) Peñarol de Mar del Plata
- Grand Final MVP: Alex Garcia

Statistical leaders
Points	(United States) Justin Keenan	19.3
Rebounds	(Brazil) Olivinha	8.3
Assists	(Argentina) Nicolás Laprovíttola	7.1

The 2015 FIBA Americas League was the 8th edition of the top intercontinental professional basketball competition in the Americas. Bauru of Brazil, won its first intercontinental title, after they beat Pioneros de Quintana Roo of Mexico, in the Grand Finals.

== Preliminary round ==
=== Group A ===
Pos	Team	Pld	W	L	PF	PA	PD	Pts	Qualification
1	(Argentina) Peñarol de Mar del Plata	3	3	0	234	211	+23	6	Advanced to Quarterfinals
2	(Brazil) São José dos Campos	3	2	1	255	219	+36	5	Advanced to Quarterfinals
3	(Mexico) Fuerza Regia	3	1	2	244	242	+2	4	
4	(Nicaragua) Leones Alcaldia de Managua	3	0	3	210	271	−61	3	

Source: fibaamericas.com

16 January 2015
18:00

Boxscore

Peñarol de Mar del Plata (Argentina)	84–72	(Mexico) Fuerza Regia
Scoring by quarter: 27-18, 22-19, 17-21, 18-14
Pts: Giddens 18; Rebs: Giddens 7 Asts: Konsztadt, Boccia 4		Pts: Phelps 18; Rebs: Allred 14; Asts: Stitt 4

Ginásio Lineu de Moura, São José dos Campos (BRA)

16 January 2015
20:15

Boxscore

São José dos Campos (Brazil)	100–68	(Nicaragua) Leones Alcaldia de Managua
Scoring by quarter: 25-18, 30-23, 20-9, 25-18
Pts: Dedé 24; Rebs: Rafael Mineiro 9 Asts: Valtinho 9		Pts: Berdiel 23; Rebs: Lopez 8 Asts: Berdiel 5

Ginásio Lineu de Moura, São José dos Campos (BRA)

17 January 2015
16:00

Boxscore

Leones Alcaldia de Managua (Nicaragua)	67–77	(Argentina) Peñarol de Mar del Plata
Scoring by quarter: 17-21, 21-19, 16-17, 13-20
Pts: Berdiel 19; Rebs: Narvaez 10; Asts: Muñoz 4		Pts: Gutiérrez 18; Rebs: Giddens 11; Asts: Boccia 6

Ginásio Lineu de Moura, São José dos Campos (BRA)

17 January 2015
18:15

Boxscore

Fuerza Regia (Mexico)	78–83	(Brazil) São José dos Campos
Scoring by quarter: 19-12, 21-27, 22-18, 16-26
Pts: Phelps 25; Rebs: Allred 13; Asts: Allred 3		Pts: Baxter 17; Rebs: Rafael Mineiro 10; Asts: Valtinho 6

Ginásio Lineu de Moura, São José dos Campos (BRA)

18 January 2015
16:00

Boxscore

Fuerza Regia (Mexico)	94–75	(Nicaragua) Leones Alcaldia de Managua
Scoring by quarter: 22-14, 29-19, 20-16, 23-26
Pts: Hunter 24; Rebs: Phelps 13; Asts: Giron 6		Pts: Berdiel 20; Rebs: Narvaez 10; Asts: Muñoz 9

Ginásio Lineu de Moura, São José dos Campos (BRA)

18 January 2015
18:15

Boxscore

São José dos Campos (Brazil)	72–73	(Argentina) Peñarol de Mar del Plata
Scoring by quarter: 26-16, 9-19, 18-21, 19-17
Pts: Laws 19; Rebs: Rafael Mineiro 8 Asts: Laws 5		Pts: Gutiérrez 17; Rebs: Giddens 11; Asts: Leiva 3

Ginásio Lineu de Moura, São José dos Campos (BRA)

=== Group B ===
Pos	Team	Pld	W	L	PF	PA	PD	Pts	Qualification
1	(Brazil) Flamengo	3	2	1	288	237	+51	5	Advanced to Quarterfinals
2	(Mexico) Pioneros de Quintana Roo	3	2	1	264	238	+26	5	Advanced to Quarterfinals
3	(Uruguay) Malvín	3	2	1	240	249	−9	5	
4	(Chile) Leones de Quilpué	3	0	3	243	311	−68	3	

Source: fibaamericas.com

23 January 2015
18:15

Boxscore

Malvín (Uruguay)	74–97	(Brazil) Flamengo
Scoring by quarter: 19-24, 12-20, 22-31, 21-22
Pts: Winston 21; Rebs: Asselin 7 Asts: Mazzarino 4		Pts: Laprovittola 25; Rebs: Cristiano 10; Asts: Laprovittola 10

Polifórum Benito Juárez, Cancún (MEX)

23 January 2015
20:30

Boxscore

Pioneros de Quintana Roo (Mexico)	109–83	(Chile) Leones de Quilpué
Scoring by quarter: 29-18, 24-23, 31-12, 25-30
Pts: Southwell 16; Rebs: Keenan 7 Asts: Clemente 8		Pts: Nelson 22; Rebs: Nelson 18; Asts: Washington 5

Polifórum Benito Juárez, Cancún (MEX)

24 January 2015
18:15

Boxscore

Flamengo (Brazil)	110–77	(Chile) Leones de Quilpué
Scoring by quarter: 28-18, 20-23, 30-17, 32-19
Pts: Herrmann 26; Rebs: Olivinha 12; Asts: Laprovittola 9		Pts: Nelson 18; Rebs: Nelson, Washington 6 Asts: Nelson 2

Polifórum Benito Juárez, Cancún (MEX)

24 January 2015
20:30

Boxscore

Malvín (Uruguay)	74–69	(Mexico) Pioneros de Quintana Roo
Scoring by quarter: 23-24, 17-11, 20-18, 14-16
Pts: Winston 23; Rebs: Winston, Garcés 9 Asts: Winston 5		Pts: Keenan 18; Rebs: Hernández 9 Asts: Manjarres 5

Polifórum Benito Juárez, Cancún (MEX)

25 January 2015
18:15

Boxscore

Leones de Quilpué (Chile)	83–92	(Uruguay) Malvín
Scoring by quarter: 23-26, 18-21, 21-27, 21-18
Pts: Nelson 32; Rebs: Washington 9 Asts: Amor, Cooke 3		Pts: Winston 24; Rebs: Garcés 10; Asts: Mazzarino 7

Polifórum Benito Juárez, Cancún (MEX)

25 January 2015
20:30

Boxscore

Pioneros de Quintana Roo (Mexico)	86–81	(Brazil) Flamengo
Scoring by quarter: 17-31, 30-23, 23-9, 16-18
Pts: Keenan 22; Rebs: Soriano 10; Asts: Clemente 6		Pts: Herrmann 26; Rebs: Olivinha 10; Asts: Laprovittola 12

Polifórum Benito Juárez, Cancún (MEX)

=== Group C ===
Pos	Team	Pld	W	L	PF	PA	PD	Pts	Qualification
1	(Argentina) Regatas Corrientes	3	3	0	222	183	+39	6	Advanced to Quarterfinals
2	(Mexico) Halcones Rojos	3	2	1	236	230	+6	5	Advanced to Quarterfinals
3	(Brazil) Paulistano	3	1	2	230	253	−23	4	
4	(Venezuela) Marinos de Anzoátegui	3	0	3	208	230	−22	3	

Source: fibaamericas.com

30 January 2015
19:30

Boxscore

Halcones Rojos (Mexico)	89–84	(Brazil) Paulistano
Scoring by quarter: 23-23, 18-26, 25-20, 23-15
Pts: Cruz 23; Rebs: Huertas 7 Asts: Cruz 4		Pts: César 26; Rebs: Renato C. 6 Asts: Penna 10

Estadio José Jorge Conte, Corrientes (ARG)

30 January 2015
21:45

Boxscore

Regatas Corrientes (Argentina)	63–57	(Venezuela) Marinos de Anzoátegui
Scoring by quarter: 21-16, 12-12, 25-12, 5-17
Pts: Hopson 16; Rebs: Sommerville 12; Asts: Quinteros 4		Pts: Harper 14; Rebs: G.Vargas 11; Asts: Rodgers 2

Estadio José Jorge Conte, Corrientes (ARG)

31 January 2015
19:30

Boxscore

Halcones Rojos (Mexico)	91–76	(Venezuela) Marinos de Anzoátegui
Scoring by quarter: 24-23, 25-18, 24-20, 18-15
Pts: Ebanks 22; Rebs: Gutierrez 10; Asts: Stoll 6		Pts: Rodgers 16; Rebs: Urbina, Rodgers 5 Asts: G.Vargas, Rodgers 3

Estadio José Jorge Conte, Corrientes (ARG)

31 January 2015
21:45

Boxscore

Paulistano (Brazil)	70–89	(Argentina) Regatas Corrientes
Scoring by quarter: 17-21, 17-15, 15-25, 21-28
Pts: César 10; Rebs: Arthur 8 Asts: Dawkins 4		Pts: Brussino 17; Rebs: Sommerville 8 Asts: Hopson 13

Estadio José Jorge Conte, Corrientes (ARG)

1 February 2015
19:30

Boxscore

Marinos de Anzoátegui (Venezuela)	75–76	(Brazil) Paulistano
Scoring by quarter: 13-25, 25-21, 18-18, 19-12
Pts: G.Vargas, Torres, Rodgers 14; Rebs: Bravo 8 Asts: G.Vargas 3		Pts: Holloway 27; Rebs: Holloway, Arthur 7 Asts: Penna 5

Estadio José Jorge Conte, Corrientes (ARG)

1 February 2015
21:45

Boxscore

Regatas Corrientes (Argentina)	70–56	(Mexico) Halcones Rojos
Scoring by quarter: 24-19, 11-16, 22-9, 13-12
Pts: Landoni 18; Rebs: Hopson, Rollins 8 Asts: Hopson 6		Pts: Huertas 14; Rebs: 3 players 6 Asts: Stoll 3

Estadio José Jorge Conte, Corrientes (ARG)

=== Group D ===
Pos	Team	Pld	W	L	PF	PA	PD	Pts	Qualification
1	(Brazil) Bauru	3	3	0	284	200	+84	6	Advanced to Quarterfinals
2	(Venezuela) Trotamundos	3	2	1	232	241	−9	5	Advanced to Quarterfinals
3	(Puerto Rico) Capitanes de Arecibo	3	1	2	213	207	+6	4	
4	(Colombia) Patriotas de Boyacá	3	0	3	208	289	−81	3	

Source: fibaamericas.com

6 February 2015
18:00

Boxscore

Bauru (Brazil)	82–71	(Puerto Rico) Capitanes de Arecibo
Scoring by quarter: 20-13, 25-14, 14-23, 23-21
Pts: Hettsheimeir 23; Rebs: Jefferson W. 7 Asts: Garcia 7		Pts: Santana 21; Rebs: Santana 10; Asts: Diaz, Ahearn 3

Municipality Colosseum, Tunja (COL)

6 February 2015
20:15

Boxscore

Patriotas de Boyacá (Colombia)	88–98	(Venezuela) Trotamundos
Scoring by quarter: 21-28, 29-23, 22-27, 16-20
Pts: Wormely 28; Rebs: Thomas 8 Asts: Wormely 8		Pts: Glenn 30; Rebs: Matthews 11; Asts: D.Cubillan 7

Municipality Colosseum, Tunja (COL)

7 February 2015
18:00

Boxscore

Trotamundos (Venezuela)	68–92	(Brazil) Bauru
Scoring by quarter: 13-30, 15-21, 26-18, 14-23
Pts: Lewis 20; Rebs: Matthews 7 Asts: Zamora, Matthews 3		Pts: Jefferson W. 23; Rebs: Garcia 10; Asts: Garcia 10

Municipality Colosseum, Tunja (COL)

7 February 2015
20:15

Boxscore

Capitanes de Arecibo (Puerto Rico)	81–59	(Colombia) Patriotas de Boyacá
Scoring by quarter: 27-13, 21-15, 12-17, 21-14
Pts: Cortez 14; Rebs: Jones 10; Asts: Cruz 8		Pts: Thomas 20; Rebs: Thomas 10; Asts: Restrepo 3

Municipality Colosseum, Tunja (COL)

8 February 2015
18:00

Boxscore

Trotamundos (Venezuela)	66–61	(Puerto Rico) Capitanes de Arecibo
Scoring by quarter: 12-19, 17-14, 15-9, 22-19
Pts: D.Cubillan 17; Rebs: Adeleke 11; Asts: Zamora 3		Pts: Diaz 16; Rebs: Santana 10; Asts: Diaz 2

Municipality Colosseum, Tunja (COL)

8 February 2015
20:15

Boxscore

Patriotas de Boyacá (Colombia)	61–110	(Brazil) Bauru
Scoring by quarter: 16-27, 10-22, 16-31, 19-30
Pts: Wormely 26; Rebs: Thomas 9 Asts: Restrepo 3		Pts: Gui Deodato 24; Rebs: Murilo 15; Asts: R.Fischer 4

Municipality Colosseum, Tunja (COL)

== Quarterfinals ==
=== Group E ===
Pos	Team	Pld	W	L	PF	PA	PD	Pts	Qualification
1	(Brazil) Bauru	3	3	0	277	216	+61	6	Advanced to Final 4
2	(Mexico) Pioneros de Quintana Roo	3	2	1	234	221	+13	5	Advanced to Final 4
3	(Argentina) Regatas Corrientes	3	1	2	217	246	−29	4	
4	(Brazil) São José dos Campos	3	0	3	224	269	−45	3	

Source: fibaamericas.com

20 February 2015
18:15

Boxscore

Bauru (Brazil)	90–70	(Argentina) Regatas Corrientes
Scoring by quarter: 14-21, 17-14, 32-23, 27-12
Pts: Hettsheimeir 18; Rebs: Hettsheimeir 8 Asts: Garcia 5		Pts: Sommerville 21; Rebs: Espinoza 6 Asts: Hopson 7

Polifórum Benito Juárez, Cancún (MEX)

20 February 2015
20:30

Boxscore

Pioneros de Quintana Roo (Mexico)	85–71	(Brazil) São José dos Campos
Scoring by quarter: 22-17, 20-15, 19-15, 24-24
Pts: Manjarres, Beck, Keenan 19; Rebs: Keenan 11; Asts: Manjarres 9		Pts: Laws 18; Rebs: Drudi 11; Asts: Valtinho 7

Polifórum Benito Juárez, Cancún (MEX)

21 February 2015
18:15

Boxscore

São José dos Campos (Brazil)	67–95	(Brazil) Bauru
Scoring by quarter: 17-23, 14-23, 21-23, 15-26
Pts: Laws 15; Rebs: Drudi 8 Asts: Dedé 6		Pts: Hettsheimeir 18; Rebs: Hettsheimeir, Murilo 7 Asts: Taylor 7

Polifórum Benito Juárez, Cancún (MEX)

21 February 2015
20:30

Boxscore

Regatas Corrientes (Argentina)	58–70	(Mexico) Pioneros de Quintana Roo
Scoring by quarter: 15-18, 18-14, 9-15, 16-23
Pts: Hopson 14; Rebs: Sommerville 9 Asts: Hopson 6		Pts: Keenan 21; Rebs: Hernández 7 Asts: Manjarres, Southwell 5

Polifórum Benito Juárez, Cancún (MEX)

22 February 2015
18:15

Boxscore

São José dos Campos (Brazil)	86–89	(Argentina) Regatas Corrientes
Scoring by quarter: 22-25, 25-14, 26-23, 13-27
Pts: Dedé 18; Rebs: Drudi 8 Asts: Laws 6		Pts: Rollins 27; Rebs: Rollins 12; Asts: Hopson 6

Polifórum Benito Juárez, Cancún (MEX)

22 February 2015
20:30

Boxscore

Pioneros de Quintana Roo (Mexico)	79–92	(Brazil) Bauru
Scoring by quarter: 17-21, 24-23, 23-20, 15-28
Pts: Beck 28; Rebs: Keenan 10; Asts: Pagan, Keenan 3		Pts: R.Fischer 19; Rebs: R.Fischer, Jefferson W. 6 Asts: R.Fischer 8

Polifórum Benito Juárez, Cancún (MEX)

=== Group F ===
Pos	Team	Pld	W	L	PF	PA	PD	Pts	Qualification
1	(Brazil) Flamengo	3	3	0	285	218	+67	6	Advanced to Final 4
2	(Argentina) Peñarol de Mar del Plata	3	2	1	242	215	+27	5	Advanced to Final 4
3	(Mexico) Halcones Rojos	3	1	2	209	242	−33	4	
4	(Venezuela) Trotamundos	3	0	3	201	262	−61	3	

Source: fibaamericas.com

27 February 2015
19:00

Boxscore

Flamengo (Brazil)	92–62	(Mexico) Halcones Rojos
Scoring by quarter: 17-12, 19-18, 31-18, 25-14
Pts: Marquinhos 19; Rebs: Olivinha 10; Asts: Marquinhos 5		Pts: Ebanks 20; Rebs: 3 players 5 Asts: Ebanks, Holloway 2

Polideportivo Islas Malvinas, Mar del Plata (ARG)

27 February 2015
21:15

Boxscore

Peñarol de Mar del Plata (Argentina)	73–64	(Venezuela) Trotamundos
Scoring by quarter: 18-19, 15-10, 19-19, 21-16
Pts: Giorgetti 13; Rebs: Boccia 8 Asts: Konsztadt 5		Pts: Matthews 16; Rebs: Matthews 9 Asts: Martinez 2

Polideportivo Islas Malvinas, Mar del Plata (ARG)

28 February 2015
19:00

Boxscore

Trotamundos (Venezuela)	70–105	(Brazil) Flamengo
Scoring by quarter: 27-29, 6-18, 19-33, 18-25
Pts: Matthews 14; Rebs: Matthews, Martinez 6 Asts: D.Cubillan, Aguilera 2		Pts: Herrmann 22; Rebs: Cristiano 13; Asts: Laprovittola 9

Polideportivo Islas Malvinas, Mar del Plata (ARG)

28 February 2015
21:15

Boxscore

Halcones Rojos (Mexico)	63–83	(Argentina) Peñarol de Mar del Plata
Scoring by quarter: 19-24, 12-16, 19-15, 13-28
Pts: Holloway 14; Rebs: Huertas 7 Asts: Cruz 3		Pts: Massarelli, Leiva 18; Rebs: Giorgetti 8 Asts: Boccia 7

Polideportivo Islas Malvinas, Mar del Plata (ARG)

1 March 2015
18:15

Boxscore

Halcones Rojos (Mexico)	84–67	(Venezuela) Trotamundos
Scoring by quarter: 22-15, 23-14, 23-13, 16-25
Pts: Stoll 17; Rebs: Gutierrez 11; Asts: Cruz 4		Pts: P.Cubillan 11; Rebs: Matthews 9 Asts: P.Cubillan 4

Polideportivo Islas Malvinas, Mar del Plata (ARG)

1 March 2015
20:30

Boxscore

Peñarol de Mar del Plata (Argentina)	86–88	(Brazil) Flamengo
Scoring by quarter: 17-22, 13-23, 22-24, 34-19
Pts: Gutierrez 20; Rebs: Leiva, Boccia 5 Asts: Konsztadt 6		Pts: Laprovittola 18; Rebs: Olivinha 9 Asts: Laprovittola 3

Polideportivo Islas Malvinas, Mar del Plata (ARG)

== Final 4 ==
=== Semifinals ===
March 14, 2015
18:00

Boxscore

Bauru (Brazil)	80–61	(Argentina) Peñarol
Scoring by quarter: 22–8, 19–20, 20–16, 19–16
Pts: Garcia 18; Rebs: Fischer 8 Asts: Garcia 6		Pts: Massarelli 16; Rebs: Boccia 7 Asts: 3 players 1

Rio de Janeiro

March 14, 2015
20:15

Boxscore

Flamengo (Brazil)	80–81 (OT)	(Mexico) Pioneros de Quintana Roo
Scoring by quarter: 23–14, 19–26, 16–20, 16–14, Overtime: 7–8
Pts: Marquinhos 27; Rebs: Meyinsse 7 Asts: Marquinhos 27		Pts: Keenan 25; Rebs: Hernández 12; Asts: Manjarres 5

Rio de Janeiro

=== Third Place Game ===
March 15, 2015
18:00

Boxscore

Peñarol de Mar del Plata (Argentina)	81–97	(Brazil) Flamengo
Scoring by quarter: 23-31, 20-19, 14-24, 24–23
Pts: Massarelli, Leiva 15; Rebs: Leiva 7 Asts: Massarelli 4		Pts: Laprovittola, Benite 24; Rebs: Cristiano 9 Asts: Laprovittola 9

Rio de Janeiro

=== Grand Final ===
March 15, 2015
20:15

Boxscore

Bauru (Brazil)	86–72	(Mexico) Pioneros de Quintana Roo
Scoring by quarter: 24–24, 22–17, 26–18, 24–13
Pts: Hettsheimeir 30; Rebs: Murilo 11; Asts: Fischer 9		Pts: Keenan 23; Rebs: Manjarres, López 5 Asts: Clemente 3

Rio de Janeiro

== Awards ==
Grand Finals Most Valuable Player

- (Brazil) Alex Garcia – Bauru
