= Giovanni Rivera (basketball coach) =

Mexican basketball coach

Calor de Cancún
- Position: Assistant coach
- League: LNBP

Personal information
- Born: Celaya, Guanajuato, Mexico
- Coaching career: 2010–present

Career history

Coaching
- 2010: Abejas de Guanajuato
- 2011: Águilas Rojas de San Juan del Río
- 2011: Volcanes del Estado de México
- 2012: Lechugueros de León
- 2013: Pioneros de Quintana Roo
- 2014: Meta La Salle
- 2014: Patriotas de la Tunja
- 2014: CRA Hoceima
- 2015: Zonkeys de Tijuana
- 2015: Marinos de Bolívar
- 2017: Libertadores de Querétaro (General Manager)
- 2018–2019: Libertadores de Querétaro
- 2020: Indígenas de Matagalpa
- 2021: UNAN León
- 2021: Real Estelí (Assistant)
- 2021–2022: Al Qadsia
- 2022: Caribbean Storm
- 2022: Taurinos de Aragua
- 2023: Indomables de Ciudad Juárez
- 2023: Dijlah University (Assistant)
- 2023: Freseras de Irapuato
- 2023: Halcones Rojos Veracruz (Assistant)
- 2024: Halcones Rojos Veracruz (General Manager)
- 2024–2025: El Salvador (women) (Assistant)
- 2025: Leones de Managua
- 2026–present: El Calor de Cancún (women)
- 2026–present: El Calor de Cancún (Assistant)

Yussel Giovanni Rivera Solís is a Mexican basketball coach. He is the head coach of the El Calor de Cancún (women).

== Coaching career ==
Rivera started his coaching career in 2011 with Abejas de Guanajuato in the LNBP league. He has coached teams such as Águilas Rojas de San Juan del Río, Volcanes del Estado de México, Lechugueros de León, Pioneros de Quintana Roo, Halcones Rojos Veracruz and Libertadores de Querétaro. In 2023 he coached Indomables de Ciudad Juárez of the LBE. In Nicaragua he has coached the teams Indígenas de Matagalpa, UNAN León, Real Estelí and Leones de Managua. In Colombia he has coached Patriotas de la Tunja, Marinos de Bolívar and Caribbean Storm. He has also coached in countries like Bolivia, Morocco, Kuwait, Venezuela, Iraq and El Salvador. in 2026, he signed with El Calor de Cancún (women), he previously coached Freseras de Irapuato from the LNBPF.
