= Alejandro Villanueva =

Alejandro Villanueva may refer to:

- Alejandro Villanueva (footballer) (1908–1944), Peruvian footballer
- Alex Villanueva (born 1963), 33rd sheriff of Los Angeles County
- Alejandro Villanueva (American football) (born 1988), American football player
- Alejandro Villanueva (basketball) (born 1993), Mexican basketball player

== See also ==
- Estadio Alejandro Villanueva, stadium in Peru
