= Jaron Martin (basketball) =

American-born Mexican basketball player (born 1994)

No. 0 – Panteras de Aguascalientes
- Position: Point guard
- League: LNBP

Personal information
- Born: 5 November 1994 (age 32) Sunland-Tujunga, Los Angeles, California, U.S.
- Listed height: 5 ft 10 in (1.78 m)
- Listed weight: 169 lb (77 kg)

Career information
- College: UC Irvine (2013–2017)
- NBA draft: 2017: undrafted
- Playing career: 2017–present

Career history
- 2017–2018: Panteras de Aguascalientes
- 2017–2018: Frayles de Guasave
- 2018–2019: Santos de San Luis
- 2018–2019: Gigantes de Jalisco
- 2019–2020: Dorados de Chihuahua
- 2019–2020: Huracanes de Tampico
- 2020–2021: Fuerza Regia de Monterrey
- 2021: CB Myrtia
- 2021–2022: Alliance Sport Alsace
- 2022: Rapla KK
- 2022–2023: OKK Borac
- 2023–present: Panteras de Aguascalientes
- 2024–present: Dorados de Chihuahua
- 2025–present: Astros de Jalisco

Jaron Michael Martin (born 5 November 1994) is an American-born Mexican professional basketball player for the Panteras de Aguascalientes of the Liga Nacional de Baloncesto Profesional LNBP, and the Mexican National Team.

== Career ==
Martin made his debut in the 2017 season with the Panteras de Aguascalientes to play in the LNBP, he also have played for the teams Santos de San Luis, Fuerza Regia de Monterrey, Huracanes de Tampico, Astros de Jalisco and Dorados de Chihuahua from the same league. He also has played in CIBACOPA for Frayles de Guasave, Astros de Jalisco and Gigantes de Jalisco. In 2021 he signed with CB Myrtia. The same year he signed with Alliance Sport Alsace. In 2022 he signed with OKK Borac.

== National team career ==
He was a member of the Mexican national team that participated in the 2027 FIBA Basketball World Cup qualification (Americas).
