= Jordi Vizcaíno =

Spanish basketball coach

Correbasket UAT (women)
- Position: Head coach
- League: Liga Nacional de Baloncesto Profesional Femenil

Personal information
- Born: 17 July 1977 (age 49) Lloret de Mar, Catalonia Spain
- Coaching career: 2004–present

Career history

Coaching
- 2004–2005: Romauto Mataró
- 2011–2012: Femení Sant Adriá
- 2019–2023: Spain U18 (women) (Assistant)
- 2014–2015: Femení Sant Adriá
- 2017–2018: Boet Mataró
- 2022–2026: Joventut Badalona (women)
- 2026–: Correbasket UAT (women)

Jordi Vizcaíno (born 17 July 1977) is a Spanish basketball coach. He is the head coach of the Correbasket UAT (women).

== Coaching career ==
Vizcaíno started his coaching career in 2004 with Romauto Mataró. In the 2022 season, he joined Joventut Badalona (women). On 2026, Vizcaíno signed with the Correbasket UAT (women) of Liga Nacional de Baloncesto Profesional Femenil.
