= Alejandro Villanueva (basketball) =

Mexican basketball player (born 1993)

No. 71 – Calor de Cancún
- Position: Small forward
- League: LNBP

Personal information
- Born: 28 August 1993 (age 33) Nogales, Sonora, Mexico
- Listed height: 6 ft 7 in (2.01 m)
- Listed weight: 220 lb (100 kg)

Career information
- College: Centro de Estudios Universitarios
- Playing career: 2017–present

Career history
- 2017–2020: Panteras de Aguascalientes
- 2022: Soles de Mexicali
- 2023: Dorados de Chihuahua
- 2023: Halcones Rojos Veracruz
- 2023: Halcones de Xalapa
- 2024: Dorados de Chihuahua
- 2024: Panteras de Aguascalientes
- 2025: Dorados de Chihuahua
- 2025: Ostioneros de Guaymas
- 2025: Panteras de Aguascalientes
- 2026: Indios de Ciudad Juárez
- 2026–present: El Calor de Cancún

Alejandro Villanueva López (born 28 August 1993) is a Mexican professional basketball player for El Calor de Cancún of the Liga Nacional de Baloncesto Profesional (LNBP).

== Career ==
Villanueva made his debut in the 2017 season with the Panteras de Aguascalientes to play in the LNBP. In the season 2023 he played with Halcones Rojos Veracruz and Halcones de Xalapa. In 2025 he signed with Dorados de Chihuahua in the LBE.

== National team career ==
In 2024, he was a member of the preliminary list of the Mexican national team that participated in the 2024 FIBA Men's Olympic Qualifying Tournaments.
