= Idris Ibn Idris =

Mexican basketball player (born 1991)

Idris Alvarado
Personal information
- Born: October 19, 1991 (age 35) San Diego, California, U.S.
- Listed height: 6 ft 5 in (1.96 m)
- Listed weight: 176 lb (80 kg)

Career information
- High school: Hoover (San Diego, California)
- College: UC Riverside (2009–2010); Bethany (KS) (2012–2014)
- Playing career: 2014–present
- Position: Point guard

Career history
- 2014–2015: Halcones de Xalapa
- 2015–2016: Gigantes Edomex
- 2016–2018: Toros de Nuevo Laredo
- 2020–2022: Panteras de Aguascalientes
- 2022–2023: Mineros de Zacatecas
- 2023: Panteras de Aguascalientes
- 2025: Indomables de Ciudad Juárez
- 2025: Tijuana Zonkeys
Medals
Men's basketball
Representing Mexico
FIBA AmeriCup
Bronze medal – third place	2017 Argentina

Idris Ibn Dawud Alvarado (born October 19, 1991) is a Mexican basketball player for Panteras de Aguascalientes of the Liga Nacional de Baloncesto Profesional (LNBP), and the Mexico national basketball team.

He participated at the 2017 FIBA AmeriCup and previously played for UC Riverside.
