= Jorge de la Serna =

Mexican basketball player (born 1999)

No. 7 – Panteras de Aguascalientes
- Position: Small forward
- League: LNBP

Personal information
- Born: 16 June 1999 (age 27) Aguascalientes City, Aguascalientes, Mexico
- Listed height: 6 ft 7 in (2.01 m)
- Listed weight: 220 lb (100 kg)

Career information
- College: Universidad de las Américas Puebla
- Playing career: 2023–present

Career history
- 2023: Astros de Jalisco
- 2023: Panteras de Aguascalientes
- 2024: Mexico City Capitanes
- 2024: Astros de Jalisco
- 2024–present: Panteras de Aguascalientes
- 2026: Dorados de Chihuahua
- 2026: Ostioneros de Guaymas

Jorge de la Serna Delgado (born 16 June 1999) is a Mexican professional basketball player.

== Career ==
De la Serna made his debut in the 2023 season with the Astros de Jalisco to play in the CIBACOPA. In the season 2023 and 2024 he played with Panteras de Aguascalientes in the LNBP. In 2024 he played with Mexico City Capitanes in the NBA G League. In 2025 he signed with Indomables de Ciudad Juárez.

== National team career ==
Since 2024, he is member of the Mexican national team. He was part of the squad that participated in the 2025 FIBA AmeriCup qualification.
