= Luis García (basketball coach) =

Mexican basketball coach

Santas del Potosí
- Position: Head coach
- League: LNBPF

Personal information
- Born: 3 July 1968 (age 58) Mexico City, Mexico
- Coaching career: 2009–present

Career history

Coaching
- 2009: Estrellas Indebasquet del Distrito Federal
- 2010: Pilares del Distrito Federal
- 2011: Titanes Capital del Distrito Federal
- 2012: Volcanes del Estado de México
- 2013: Gansos Salvajes UIC
- 2014–2025: Correbasket UAT
- 2023–2025: Correbasket UAT (women)
- 2026–present: Santas del Potosí

Luis Andrés García Sevilla (born 3 July 1968) is a Mexican basketball coach. He is the head coach of the Correbasket UAT.

== Coaching career ==
García started his coaching career with Estrellas Indebasquet del Distrito Federal in the LNBP league. He has coached teams such as Correbasket UAT (both men's and women's squads), Gansos Salvajes UIC, Volcanes del Estado de México, Titanes Capital del Distrito Federal and Pilares del Distrito Federal.
