= Carlos Alonso (basketball coach) =

Spanish basketball coach

Soles de Mexicali
- Position: Assistant coach
- League: LNBP

Personal information
- Born: 19 December 1990 (age 35) Málaga Spain
- Coaching career: 2010–present

Career history

Coaching
- 2010–2017: Reserves teams of Baloncesto Málaga
- 2017–2018: Reserves teams of C.B. Palo
- 2019–2021: Link Lions Basketball
- 2022: Abejas de León (Assistant)
- 2023: Dorados de Chihuahua (Assistant)
- 2023: CD La Salle Melilla (Assistant)
- 2024–present: Fuerza Regia de Monterrey (women)
- 2025: Fuerza Regia de Monterrey (Assistant)
- 2026–present: Soles de Mexicali (Assistant)

Carlos Alonso (born 19 December 1990) is a Spanish basketball coach. He is the head coach of the Fuerza Regia de Monterrey (women).

== Coaching career ==
Alonso started his coaching career in 2010 with the reserves teams of Baloncesto Málaga. In the 2022 season, he joined the staff of Abejas de León winning the championship season. The next season, he joined the staff of Club Deportivo La Salle Melilla. On 2024, Alonso signed with the Fuerza Regia de Monterrey (women) of Liga Nacional de Baloncesto Profesional Femenil winning the championship of the 2024 season. In 2025, Alonso joined the staff of Fuerza Regia de Monterrey of Liga Nacional de Baloncesto Profesional.
