= Auditorio Hermanos Carreón =

Arena in Aguascalientes, Mexico

- Interactive map of Auditorio Hermanos Carreón
- Location: Aguascalientes, Mexico
- Coordinates: 21.8787°N 102.2723°W
- Capacity: 3,000

Construction
- Opened: 1975

Tenants
- Panteras de Aguascalientes (LNBP) (1975–present); Panteras de Aguascalientes (women) (LNBPF) (2022–present)

The Auditorio Hermanos Carreón is an arena in Aguascalientes, Mexico. The arena was opened on 1975 it was named due to the internationally renowned basketball-playing brothers, the famous "Flaco" Eugenio Carreón Díaz and Rodolfo Carreón Díaz "Roca". The arena is the home venue of the Panteras de Aguascalientes and the Panteras de Aguascalientes (women).
