= Polifórum Benito Juárez =

Sports venue in Cancún, Quintana Roo, Mexico

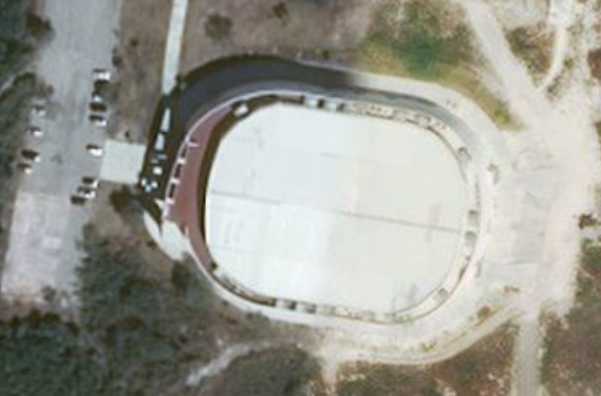
- Interactive map of Polifórum Benito Juárez
- Location: Blvd. Luis Donaldo Colosio Km. 7.5, Carretera Cancún-Aeropuerto, Región 295, Manzana 04, Fracc 02, Benito Juárez, Cancún, Quintana Roo. Código Postal 77565
- Coordinates: 21°06′04″N 86°50′06″W
- Owner: Benito Juárez Municipality, Quintana Roo
- Operator: Pioneros de Quintana Roo
- Capacity: Basketball: 4,800; Concerts: 6,000
- Surface: Multi-surface
- Field size: 750,500 square feet

Construction
- Groundbreaking: December 23, 2008
- Opened: May 1, 2009
- Cost: $98 million
- Architect: Roberto Arpón
- Project manager: Arpón Bureau
- Structural engineer: Roberto Arpón
- Services engineer: Roberto Arpón
- General contractor: Maiz-Mier

Tenants
- Pioneros de Quintana Roo (LNBP) (2006–2016); El Calor de Cancún (LNBP) (2024–); El Calor de Cancún (women) (LNBPF) (2025–)

The Polifórum Cancún (before named Benito Juárez) a 4,800 -seat indoor arena in Cancún, Quintana Roo, was built in just 128 days in 2008. It was refurbished in 2024, after having been abandoned for more than eight years.

It was built as the home of the Pioneros de Quintana Roo basketball team that disappeared from the National Professional Basketball League after being champion and nowadays after the remodeling, inclusion of boxes, VIP area and courtside.

The arena was built of reinforced concrete in order to withstand hurricanes that may come through the Yucatán Peninsula. It can also serve a shelter in case of a natural disaster.

In addition to serving as home of the Pioneros and as a shelter for natural disasters, the Polifórum is also used for concerts, other sporting events, and other special events. It is also unusual in that its center-hung scoreboard does not include video screens, a must for most new arenas in the 21st century. There are 2,200 permanent seats. The arena cost 98 million pesos to build.

The arena can seat up to 6,000 for concerts. The arena's lighting equipment was installed especially for large-scale TV transmission. Additionally, the Poliforum has all of the comforts of a gymnasium and, among its qualities, is equipped with four dressing rooms for teams participating in any tournament and recording artists who are performing live in concert.

== History ==
The Poliforum Benito Juárez was a dream come true.

=== First international sporting event ===
In 2009 came the first international sporting event in its history with the completion of the American Basketball Championship with the participation of Panama, Costa Rica, Nicaragua, Belize, El Salvador, Guatemala, Honduras and Mexico

From 5 to 9 August, the Central American tournament averaged 5,000 spectators a day in the regular season and sold out during the finals, where the end Mexico was crowned champion after beating area selection in Belize.

=== Governor's Cup ===
In addition to international championships endorsed by FIBA Americas, the Quintana Roo Pioneers club has also organized tournaments like the cup "Governor" Basketball in the Poliforum Benito Juárez and which comply with its third edition.

The Governor's Cup gathers eight US universities affiliated to the NCAA and is held from 22 to 25 December each year. The tournament is organized in conjunction with ESPN International Special Events division. In 2010 the Colorado State University was proclaimed champion.

=== FIBA u16 Championship ===
Also, the Poliforum Benito Juárez and premundial hosted the Under 16 FIBA Americas basketball, where teams of USA, Argentina and Canada got their pass to global specialty.

=== Concerts ===
The Poliforum Benito Juarez has welcomed performers from not just Mexico and Latin America but also around the world.
