= El Calor de Cancún =

- League: LNBP
- Founded: 29 February 2024; 2 years ago
- Arena: Polifórum Benito Juárez
- Capacity: 4,800
- Location: Cancún, Quintana Roo, Mexico
- Team colors: Red, gold, and black
- President: Roberto Alvarado
- Head coach: Néstor García
Home	Away	Third

El Calor de Cancún (English: The Cancún Heat) are a Mexican professional basketball team based in Cancún, Quintana Roo. The Calor are members of the Liga Nacional de Baloncesto Profesional (LNBP) and play their games in the Polifórum Benito Juárez.

== History ==
On 29 February 2024, the team was presented at a press conference as an expansion team in the Liga Nacional de Baloncesto Profesional (LNBP), with Roberto Alvarado serving as team president. It was also announced by Mara Lezama, the Governor of Quintana Roo, that the Calor would be playing at the recently renovated Polifórum Benito Juárez. They would also be the first professional basketball team to play in the state since the Pioneros de Quintana Roo in 2016.

The Calor hired Argentine coach Fernando Duró as the team's inaugural head coach in late April before announcing Mexican guard Raúl Delgado as their first signing in late May.

The Calor played its first official game on 12 July 2024, suffering an 86–79 defeat to the Mineros de Zacatecas. They achieved their first-ever victory the following day, beating the Mineros 83–75.

== Players ==
=== Current roster ===
Note: Flags indicate national team eligibility at FIBA-sanctioned events. Players may hold other non-FIBA nationalities not displayed.

El Calor de Cancún roster
Players
Coaches

Pos.	No.	Nat.	Name	Ht.	Wt.	Age
PG	0	(United States)	Nelson, Sa'eed	1.88 m (6 ft 2 in)	86 kg (190 lb)
PF	1	(Lithuania)	Želionis, Edgaras	2.08 m (6 ft 10 in)	100 kg (220 lb)
SG	2	(United States)	Galloway, Brevin	1.87 m (6 ft 2 in)	87 kg (192 lb)
PG	4	(Mexico)	Ramírez, Miguel	1.83 m (6 ft 0 in)	86 kg (190 lb)
SF	5	(United States)	Geronimo, Jordan	1.97 m (6 ft 6 in)	100 kg (220 lb)
PF	8	(United States)	Mitchell, D. J.	2.03 m (6 ft 8 in)	106 kg (234 lb)
C	9	(Mexico)	Trasviña, Daniel	2.05 m (6 ft 9 in)	104 kg (229 lb)
SG	11	(United States)	Fitzgerald, B. J.	2.00 m (6 ft 7 in)	100 kg (220 lb)
C	16	(France)	Cingala-Mata, Bruno	2.05 m (6 ft 9 in)	105 kg (231 lb)
PG	21	(Mexico)	Stoll, Paul	1.80 m (5 ft 11 in)	79 kg (174 lb)
SG	24	(Puerto Rico)	Pinzón, Rafael	1.96 m (6 ft 5 in)	90 kg (198 lb)
C	27	(Mexico)	Martínez, Irving	2.06 m (6 ft 9 in)	104 kg (229 lb)
F	31	(United States)	Eddie, Jarell	2.01 m (6 ft 7 in)	100 kg (220 lb)
F/C	33	(United States)	Reed, Willie	2.11 m (6 ft 11 in)	111 kg (245 lb)
SF	71	(Mexico)	Villanueva, Alejandro	2.01 m (6 ft 7 in)	100 kg (220 lb)

Head coach

- (Argentina) Néstor García

Assistant coach(es)

- (Mexico) Giovanni Rivera
- (Argentina) Juan Manuel Nardini

Legend

- (C) Team captain
- Injured

- Roster
Updated: August 1, 2026

=== Notable players ===
Note: Flags indicate national team eligibility at FIBA-sanctioned events. Players may hold other non-FIBA nationalities not displayed.

Criteria

To appear in this section a player must have either:

- Set a club record or won an individual award while at the club
- Played at least one official international match for their national team at any time
- Played at least one official NBA match at any time.

- (Lithuania) Egidijus Mockevičius
- (Lithuania) Edgaras Želionis
- (Panama) Trevor Gaskins
- (Rwanda) Prince Ibeh
- (United States) Vander Blue
- (United States) Archie Goodwin
- (Venezuela) Heissler Guillent
- (Venezuela) Jhornan Zamora
