= José Antonio Santaella =

Spanish basketball coach

Panteras de Aguascalientes
- Position: Head coach
- League: LNBP

Personal information
- Born: 27 August 1987 (age 39) Córdoba, Spain
- Coaching career: 2011–present

Career history

Coaching
- 2011: ADEBA
- 2011–2012: CB Plasencia Ambroz (assistant)
- 2012–2013: CP Peñarroya
- 2013–2014: Club Baloncesto Gran Canaria II
- 2016–2017: Smurfit Kappa BBall Córdoba
- 2018–2019: Cordobasket
- 2021: Abejas de León (assistant)
- 2022–2023: CP Peñarroya
- 2023–2025: CB Morón
- 2025–present: Panteras de Aguascalientes (women)
- 2025–present: Panteras de Aguascalientes

José Antonio Santaella Cuenca (born 27 August 1987) is a Spanish basketball coach. He is the head coach of the Panteras de Aguascalientes (women).

== Coaching career ==
Santaella started his coaching career in Spain with the ADEBA. In the 2011–12 season, he was the assistant coach for CB Plasencia Ambroz. In 2021 he joined the staff of Abejas de León, where he won the 2022 championship. In 2023 he signed with CB Morón.

On 2025, Santaella signed with the Panteras de Aguascalientes (women).
