= Estadio José Jorge Conte =

Estadio José Jorge Contte
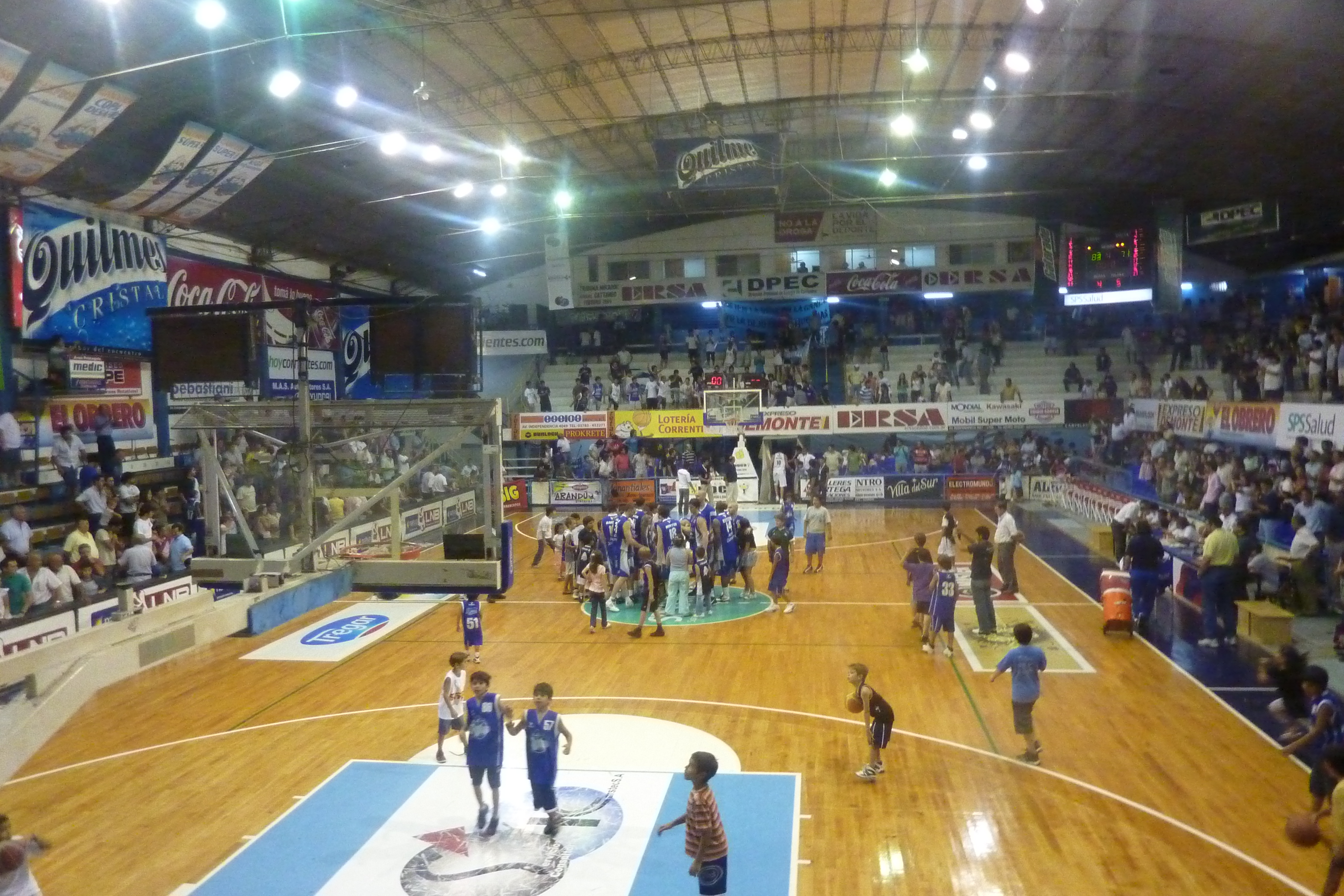
- Interactive map of Estadio José Jorge Contte
- Location: Corrientes, Argentina
- Coordinates: 27.45895°S 58.82993°W
- Owner: Regatas Corrientes
- Capacity: 2,600

Construction
- Opened: 1970
- Renovated: 2015

The Estadio José Jorge Contte is an indoor arena in Corrientes, Argentina. It is primarily used for basketball and is the home arena of Regatas Corrientes. It's one of the biggest in the north region of Argentina, holding 2,600 people.

It hosted the 2015 FIVB Volleyball Boys' U19 World Championship.
