= Christopher Gutiérrez =

Venezuelan basketball coach

Freseros de Irapuato
- Position: Head coach
- League: Liga Nacional de Baloncesto Profesional

Personal information
- Born: Venezuela
- Coaching career: 2023–present

Career history

Coaching
- 2023: Astros de Jalisco (women) (assistant)
- 2024: Fuerza Regia de Monterrey (women) (assistant)
- 2024: Freseros de Irapuato (Assistant)
- 2025–: Freseras de Irapuato
- 2025–: Freseros de Irapuato

Christopher Gutiérrez is a Venezuelan basketball coach. He is the head coach of the Freseros de Irapuato.

== Coaching career ==
Gutiérrez started his coaching career in 2023 as part of the staff of Astros de Jalisco (women). In the 2024 season, he joined the staff of Fuerza Regia de Monterrey (women). On 2025, Gutiérrez signed as head coach of the Freseras de Irapuato of Liga Nacional de Baloncesto Profesional.
