= Greg Vanderjagt =

Australian basketball player and coach

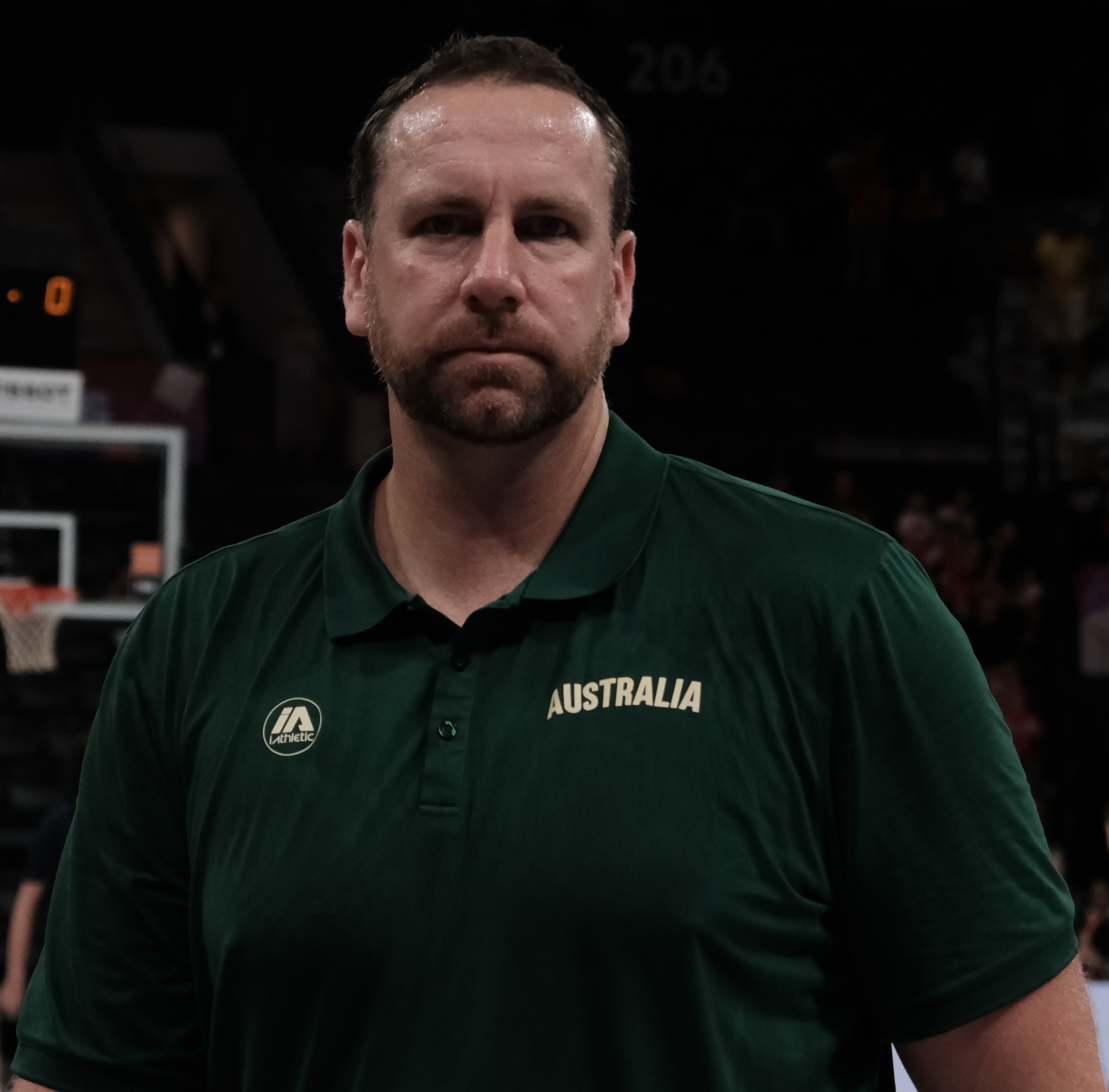
- Vanderjagt coaching the Australian Crocs at the 2026 FIBA Under-17 Basketball World Cup

Personal information
- Born: 27 May 1984 (age 42) Kempsey, New South Wales
- Listed height: 213 cm (7 ft 0 in)
- Listed weight: 110 kg (243 lb)

Career information
- Playing career: 2003–2015
- Position: Centre
- Number: 13, 21
- Coaching career: 2014–present

Career history

Playing
- 2003–2008: Townsville Crocodiles
- 2008–2010: Gold Coast Blaze
- 2011: Townsville Crocodiles
- 2013–2015: Townsville Crocodiles

Coaching
- 2014: Mackay Meteors (assistant)
- 2015–2016: Townsville Crocodiles (assistant)
- 2020–2022: Brisbane Bullets (assistant)
- 2022–2023: Brisbane Bullets
- 2023–2026: Brisbane Bullets (assistant)
- 2024–2025: Brisbane Capitals

Career highlights
- QBL champion (2012)

Gregory Ron Vanderjagt (born 27 May 1984) is an Australian professional basketball coach and former player. He played 10 seasons in the National Basketball League (NBL) before entering the coaching ranks. He served as the head coach of the Brisbane Bullets in 2022–23.

== Playing career ==
In 2002 and 2003, Djeric attended the Australian Institute of Sport (AIS) in Canberra.

Vanderjagt, a 7-foot-0-inch (213 cm) tall centre, started his NBL career with the Townsville Crocodiles in 2003–04, averaging just 4.5 points and 2.6 rebounds in his first 31 games. He stayed with the Crocodiles until the end of the 2007–08 NBL season, leaving the club after appearing in 153 games.

After leaving the Crocodiles, Vanderjagt moved to the Gold Coast and joined the Blaze for the 2008–09 season. He managed just nine games in his first season with the Blaze due to sustaining an injury in November 2008. He returned from injury in 2009 and played out the 2009–10 season with the Blaze, appearing in 25 games and helping the team to the semi-finals where they were knocked out by eventual champions Perth in two straight games.

After receiving no new contract offers, Vanderjagt sat out the entire 2010–11 season. When Townsville lost their starting centre in Luke Schenscher for the first seven games of the 2011–12 season, the Crocodiles wasted no time in signing Vanderjagt as an injury replacement. In his seven games with the Crocodiles, Vanderjagt averaged 5.0 points and 1.7 rebounds per game, making such an impression on head coach Paul Woolpert that he began replacing Ben Allen as starting centre. He left the club in late November 2011 upon Schenscher's return to the line-up.

On 16 July 2013, Vanderjagt re-signed with the Crocodiles for the 2013–14 season. On 28 July 2014, he re-signed with the Crocodiles for the 2014–15 season.

== Coaching career ==
In 2014, Vanderjagt took on an assistant coaching role with the QBL's Mackay Meteors.

On 3 July 2015, Vanderjagt announced his retirement from professional basketball to take on an assistant coaching role at the Townsville Crocodiles.

In 2020, Vanderjagt was appointed assistant coach of the Brisbane Bullets. On 13 December 2022, he was elevated to the Bullets' interim head coach. Ten days later, he was confirmed as the Bullets' head coach for the rest of the 2022–23 NBL season. In February 2023, he was reassigned to lead assistant coach for the 2023–24 season.

In September 2023, Vanderjagt was appointed head coach of the Brisbane Capitals men's team of the NBL1 North on a three-year deal.

Following the 2024–25 NBL season, Vanderjagt was retained as assistant coach of the Bullets to accompany new head coach, Stu Lash, re-signing for another two seasons on 5 June 2025.

Vanderjagt re-joined the Capitals as men's head coach for the 2025 NBL1 North season.

Vanderjagt parted ways with the Bullets following the 2025–26 NBL season.

Vanderjagt coached the Australia men's national under-17 basketball team at the 2026 FIBA Under-17 Basketball World Cup.
