= Panteras de Aguascalientes =

Mexican basketball team

- League: LNBP
- Founded: 1972
- History: Panteras de Aguascalientes; 1972–
- Arena: Auditorio Hermanos Carreón
- Capacity: 3,000
- Location: Aguascalientes City, Aguascalientes, Mexico
- Team colors: Gold, black and white
- President: Gabriel Delgado Rodríguez
- Head coach: José Antonio Santaella
- Championships: 1 (2003)
- Website: lnbp.mx/Panteras/
Home	Away	Third

Panteras de Aguascalientes (English: Aguascalientes Panthers) is a Mexican professional basketball team that is based in Aguascalientes City, Mexico. They play in the Liga Nacional de Baloncesto Profesional (LNBP). Their home arena is Arena Hermanos Carreón. It is one of the few teams that have remained in the LNBP since 2003, where in its first year in this league were crowned champions at the hands of coach Francisco Ramirez Orozco and one of the best foreigners on the shoulders of Devon Ford, in addition that only had 7 players in the squad in that year and with a directive without the ability to pay the salaries of the players during the playoffs.

== Players ==
=== Current roster ===
Note: Flags indicate national team eligibility at FIBA-sanctioned events. Players may hold other non-FIBA nationalities not displayed.

Panteras de Aguascalientes roster
Players
Coaches

Pos.	No.	Nat.	Name	Ht.	Wt.
PG	0	(Mexico)	Martin, Jaron	1.80 m (5 ft 11 in)	77 kg (170 lb)
SF	1	(United States)	Hill, Ahmed	1.96 m (6 ft 5 in)	95 kg (209 lb)
SG	2	(United States)	Willett, Shaun	1.93 m (6 ft 4 in)	92 kg (203 lb)
SG	4	(United States)	Cheese, Tyler	1.96 m (6 ft 5 in)	92 kg (203 lb)
SG	5	(United States)	Williamson, Daivien	1.87 m (6 ft 2 in)	88 kg (194 lb)
PF	7	(Mexico)	de la Serna, Jorge	1.98 m (6 ft 6 in)	100 kg (220 lb)
PF	10	(Mexico)	Machado, Jonatan	2.01 m (6 ft 7 in)	100 kg (220 lb)
SF	21	(Canada)	McIntosh, MiKyle	2.01 m (6 ft 7 in)	109 kg (240 lb)
C	23	(Brazil)	Lima, Augusto	2.08 m (6 ft 10 in)	118 kg (260 lb)
SF	24	(Mexico)	Girón, Gabriel	1.93 m (6 ft 4 in)	90 kg (198 lb)
PF	30	(Puerto Rico)	Negron, Christian	2.01 m (6 ft 7 in)	105 kg (231 lb)
PF	42	(Mexico)	Fierros, Axel	1.98 m (6 ft 6 in)	107 kg (236 lb)
PG	99	(United States)	Shahid, Vinnie	1.80 m (5 ft 11 in)	76 kg (168 lb)

Head coach

- (Spain) José Antonio Santaella

Assistant coach(es)

- (Spain) Manuel Suárez

Legend

- (C) Team captain
- (I) Import player
- Injured

- Roster
Updated: July 2025

== Notable players ==
Note: Flags indicate national team eligibility at FIBA-sanctioned events. Players may hold other non-FIBA nationalities not displayed.

Criteria

To appear in this section a player must have either:

- Set a club record or won an individual award while at the club
- Played at least one official international match for their national team at any time
- Played at least one official NBA match at any time.

- (Mexico) Fernando Benítez
- (Mexico) Gabriel Girón
- (Mexico) Israel Gutiérrez
- (Mexico) Idris Ibn Idris
- (Mexico) Karim Malpica
- (Mexico) Enrique Zúñiga
- (Panama) Ernesto Oglivie
- (Panama) Chris Warren
- (Puerto Rico) Alex Abreu Vásquez
- (Puerto Rico) Javier Mojica
- (Puerto Rico) Filiberto Rivera
- (United States) Mario Bennett
- (United States) Randell Jackson
- (United States) Lee Nailon
