= D. J. Mitchell (basketball) =

American basketball player (born 1997)

No. 8 – Calor de Cancún
- Position: Forward
- League: LNBP

Personal information
- Born: 12 March 1997 (age 29) Melbourne, Victoria, Australia
- Listed height: 203 cm (6 ft 8 in)
- Listed weight: 106 kg (234 lb)

Career information
- High school: Buchanan (Clovis, California)
- College: Wake Forest (2016–2018); Santa Clara (2019–2021)
- NBA draft: 2021: undrafted
- Playing career: 2021–present

Career history
- 2021–2022: BAL
- 2022: Gold Coast Rollers
- 2022–2024: Brisbane Bullets
- 2023: Śląsk Wrocław
- 2024: Ipswich Force
- 2024–2025: Manchester Basketball
- 2025–2026: South East Melbourne Phoenix
- 2026: Manchester Basketball
- 2026–present: El Calor de Cancún

Career highlights
- NBL1 North champion (2022)

Donovan James Mitchell (born 12 March 1997) is an American-Australian professional basketball player for El Calor de Cancún of the Liga Nacional de Baloncesto Profesional (LNBP). Born in Australia, he grew up in the United States and holds an Irish passport. He played college basketball for the Wake Forest Demon Deacons and Santa Clara Broncos before playing professionally in the Netherlands, Australia, Poland and England.

In 2026, Mitchell joined the Australia men's national 3x3 team.

== Early life ==
Mitchell was born in Melbourne, Victoria, to American parents. His parents met in Australia during the 1990s. His father, Mike, was playing for the North Melbourne Giants in the Australian NBL in 1997.

Mitchell grew up in Fresno, California, and attended Buchanan High School in nearby Clovis, where he was a three-time first-team all-conference honouree with the basketball team. He was an all-state volleyball player at Buchanan.

== College career ==
Mitchell played his first two college basketball seasons for the Wake Forest Demon Deacons. After playing in just four games as a freshman in 2016–17, he appeared in 30 games as a sophomore in 2017–18, averaging 2.9 points and 2.2 rebounds per game.

On 30 April 2018, Mitchell transferred to Santa Clara. He subsequently sat out the 2018–19 season due to NCAA transfer regulations.

As a redshirt junior in 2019–20, Mitchell played in all 33 games for the Broncos with 15 starts. He ranked third on the team in scoring (10.7 ppg) on 49.4 percent field goal shooting and was second on the team in both 3-point shooting (38.3 percent) and rebounding (5.2 pg). On 29 February 2020, he scored a career-high 25 points against Portland.

As a senior in 2020–21, Mitchell played in 18 games for the Broncos, starting five and averaging 6.4 points and 4.1 rebounds per game. On 16 February 2021, he scored a season-high 16 points against Loyola Marymount.

== Professional career ==
Coming out of college, Mitchell turned down an opportunity to play in Uruguay to instead begin his professional career in Ireland playing for Templeogue in the Super League while undertaking a master's degree at Griffith College. However, he left the team prior to making his debut after being lured to the Netherlands.

On 15 October 2021, Mitchell signed with Dutch team BAL of the BNXT League. In 22 games during the 2021–22 season, he averaged 16.0 points, 8.2 rebounds and 2.8 assists per game.

In June 2022, Mitchell moved to Australia and joined the Gold Coast Rollers of the NBL1 North for the rest of the 2022 season. He helped the Rollers win the NBL1 North championship. In 14 games, he averaged 18.4 points, 8.6 rebounds, 2.7 assists and 1.8 blocks per game.

Following the NBL1 North season, Mitchell joined the Brisbane Bullets of the Australian NBL for the 2022–23 season. After the Bullets opened the season 0–4, Mitchell was suspended for one game after being dismissed from training following a disagreement with coach James Duncan about his role in the team's offence. On 19 November 2022, he scored 21 points in a 90–82 loss to the Cairns Taipans. For the season, he averaged 9.56 points, 4.56 rebounds and 1.3 assists per game.

Following the NBL season, Mitchell joined Śląsk Wrocław of the Polish Basketball League for the rest of the 2022–23 PLK season. He helped the team reach the championship series, where they lost 3–2. He averaged 5.8 points in 22 games.

Mitchell re-joined the Bullets for the 2023–24 NBL season. On 20 December 2023, he was ruled out for the rest of the season with a hip injury. He averaged five points in 15 games.

In April 2024, Mitchell joined the Ipswich Force for the 2024 NBL1 North season. In 16 games, he averaged 21.44 points, 6.38 rebounds, 2.5 assists and 1.13 steals per game.

On 25 September 2024, Mitchell signed with Manchester Basketball of the Super League Basketball for the 2024–25 season. In 33 games, he averaged 14.8 points, 5.8 rebounds, 2.5 assists and 1.0 steals per game.

On 15 May 2025, Mitchell signed a two-year deal with the South East Melbourne Phoenix. In 30 games during the 2025–26 NBL season, he averaged 4.3 points and 2.0 rebounds per game. The second year of his two-year deal was not exercised by the Phoenix following the season.

On 3 April 2026, Mitchell signed with Manchester Basketball just prior to the playoffs of the 2025–26 Super League Basketball season.

In July 2026, Mitchell joined El Calor de Cancún of the Mexican Liga Nacional de Baloncesto Profesional (LNBP).

== National team ==
In March 2026, Mitchell was named in the Australia men's national 3x3 team for the FIBA 3x3 Champions Cup. He was later ruled out of the tournament due to his NBL Finals commitments. The following month, he made his Australia 3x3 debut at the 2026 FIBA 3x3 Asia Cup.

== Personal life ==
Mitchell is the son of Americans Mike Mitchell and Michelle Maher. His father played professional basketball in Australia and Europe while his mother played professional beach volleyball. His mother has Irish heritage through her grandparents. Through marriage, his father gained an Irish passport and played for the Irish national team. His parents later separated.

As a result of his Irish heritage, Mitchell also holds an Irish passport. He too is eligible to play for Ireland, which was touted as a possibility in 2021.

Mitchell has two siblings, Jaiden and Myca. Myca played volleyball at Wake Forest and Howard.

In 2022, Mitchell played for two of the same teams his father also played for in the NBL, the Gold Coast Rollers and Brisbane Bullets.
