= Ballarat Sports Events Centre =

Sports complex in Victoria, Australia

Coordinates: 37°32′06.6″S 143°50′34.8″E

Ballarat Sports Events Centre (Selkirk Stadium)
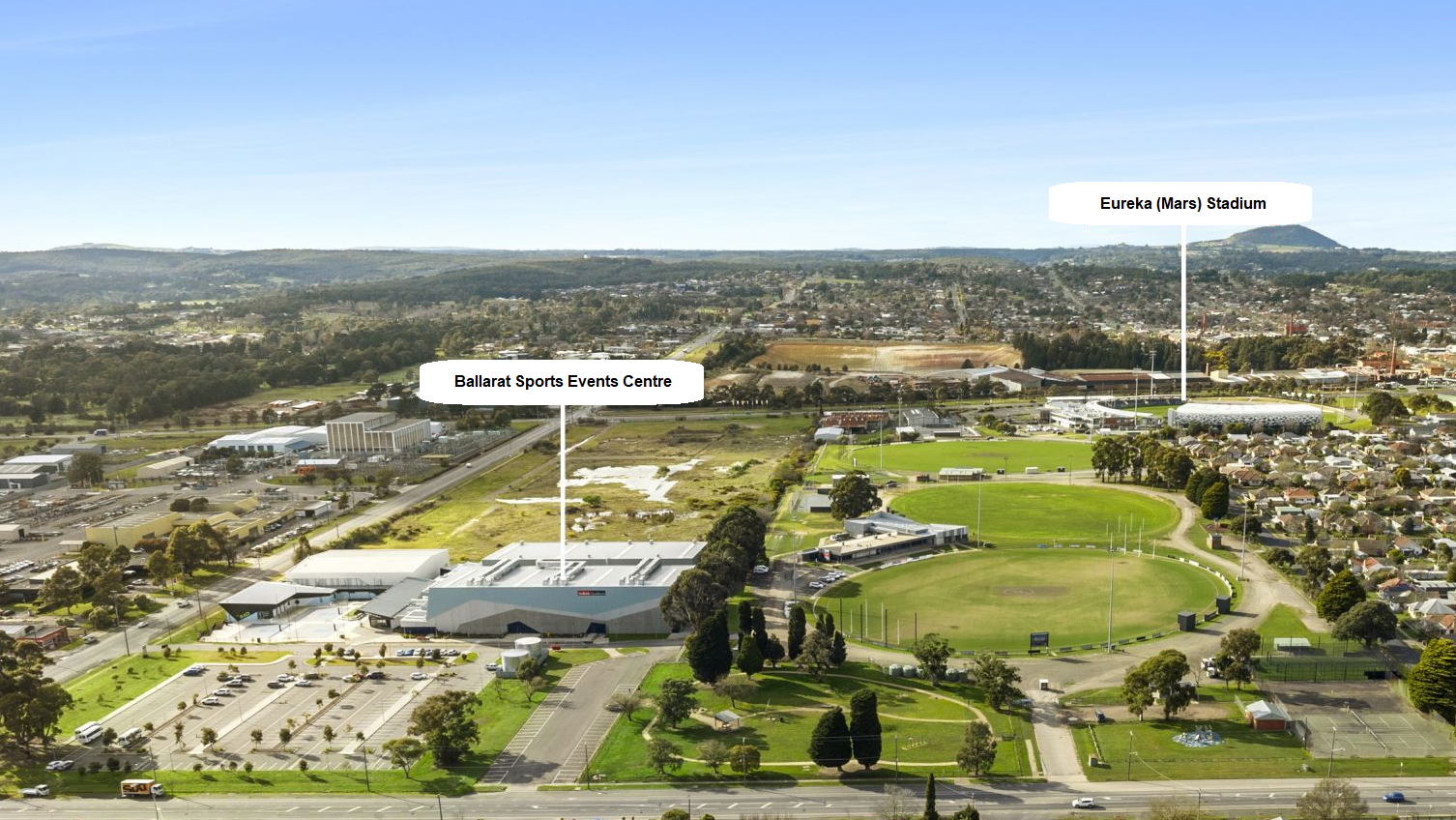
- Interactive map of Ballarat Sports Events Centre (Selkirk Stadium)
- Location: 989 Norman Street, Wendouree. Ballarat, Victoria, Australia
- Owner: City of Ballarat
- Operator: City of Ballarat
- Seating type: Retractable and fixed
- Capacity: 3000
- Type: Indoor sports stadium
- Scoreboard: Video-electronic x 2

Construction
- Groundbreaking: 1986
- Built: 1986
- Renovated: 2018–19
- Expanded: 2019
- Cost: $29.2 million (AUD)
- Builder: AW Nicholson Constructions

Tenants
- Ballarat Miners (NBL1 South) (2019-present); Bendigo Spirit (WNBL) (2024)

Ballarat Sport Events Centre, commercially named "Selkirk Stadium", is an indoor multi-use sports complex located in the Eureka Sports Precinct at Wendouree, an outer suburb north of Ballarat in Australia.

== History ==
The facility was established in 1986 as a two-court indoor community netball stadium known as the Wendouree Netball Centre. During the early 2000s the popularity of Basketball, Netball and Badminton in the Ballarat region had significantly outgrown the capacity of existing stadia built during the 1970s at the nearby Hollioake Park sports complex. Heavy user demand from local sports competitions and the community at the ageing but well maintained and modernised Hollioake Park venues including the Ballarat Minerdome Basketball and the 'Ken Kay' Badminton Stadiums limited Ballarat's ability to accommodate additional major indoor sports competitions. This prompted combined regional councils and indoor sporting associations to collectively advocate for funding to re-develop and expand the Wendouree Netball Centre into a major regional indoor multi-use sporting complex.

After several years of lobbying for funding assistance, in 2015 the Victorian State government granted $9 million financial support in addition to the Ballarat Council's commitment of $5 million to ensure that some $14 million (AUD) would jointly fund the first stage of a new Ballarat Sports and Events Centre project as a strategic component of the Ballarat Major Events Precinct Master Plan (Released in June 2015). The Master Plan being a formal document outlining a 10 year strategic plan for the development of the Eureka Sports Precinct including construction and development of the nearby Mars Stadium outdoor sports stadium as well as adjacent cricket ovals, pavilions and netball facilities.

Under the joint local council and State funding arrangement, a partial stadium complex would be designed and built connecting to the existing Wendouree Netball Centre that would add four new indoor courts and include a 1500-seat main arena. This design was to make provision for future expansion as an eight court facility expanding the main arena to 3000 capacity once additional funding could be secured. Several months later, before construction commenced, the Australian Commonwealth Government granted $10 million (AUD) under its 'Regional Development Fund' enabling full completion of the complex.

During the 2018 Victorian State election the Victorian State government committed a final grant of $5.2 million to modernise and re-skin the adjoining older Wendouree Netball Centre to integrate its design to complement the new facility. These monies also funding construction of outdoor three-on-three courts for community use, new sports clinic and strength and conditioning facilities.

In January 2022 a five-year sponsorship and naming rights agreement for the centre was struck with Ballarat's Selkirk brickworks.

On 12 and 13 April 2024, Selkirk Stadium hosted two Professional Wrestling Shows as part of the Starrcast Downunder Convention. The two shows were Mickie James' all-women's show "HER", and Bret Hart presents Australian Stampede.

== Facilities ==
The complex today consists of:

- 8 Indoor basketball/netball courts
- 1 Centre show court with 3000 seats and video screens
- 3 Outdoor 3 on 3 basketball courts
- Strength and conditioning gymnasium with an indoor running track
- Conference centre
- Café / licensed bar
- Retail store
- 300 space car park.

== Basketball and Netball venue ==
Since officially opening in July 2019, the venue has hosted a number of premier games including National Basketball League (Australia) friendly games as well as NBL1 competition games. The venue successfully managed significant other regional and national competitions throughout 2020-21 despite public gathering restrictions imposed due to the COVID pandemic. Since the easing of COVID restrictions the venue has resumed normal operations and continues to be very popular for competitors and spectators.
