= Tyler Johnson (basketball) =

American basketball player (born 1992)

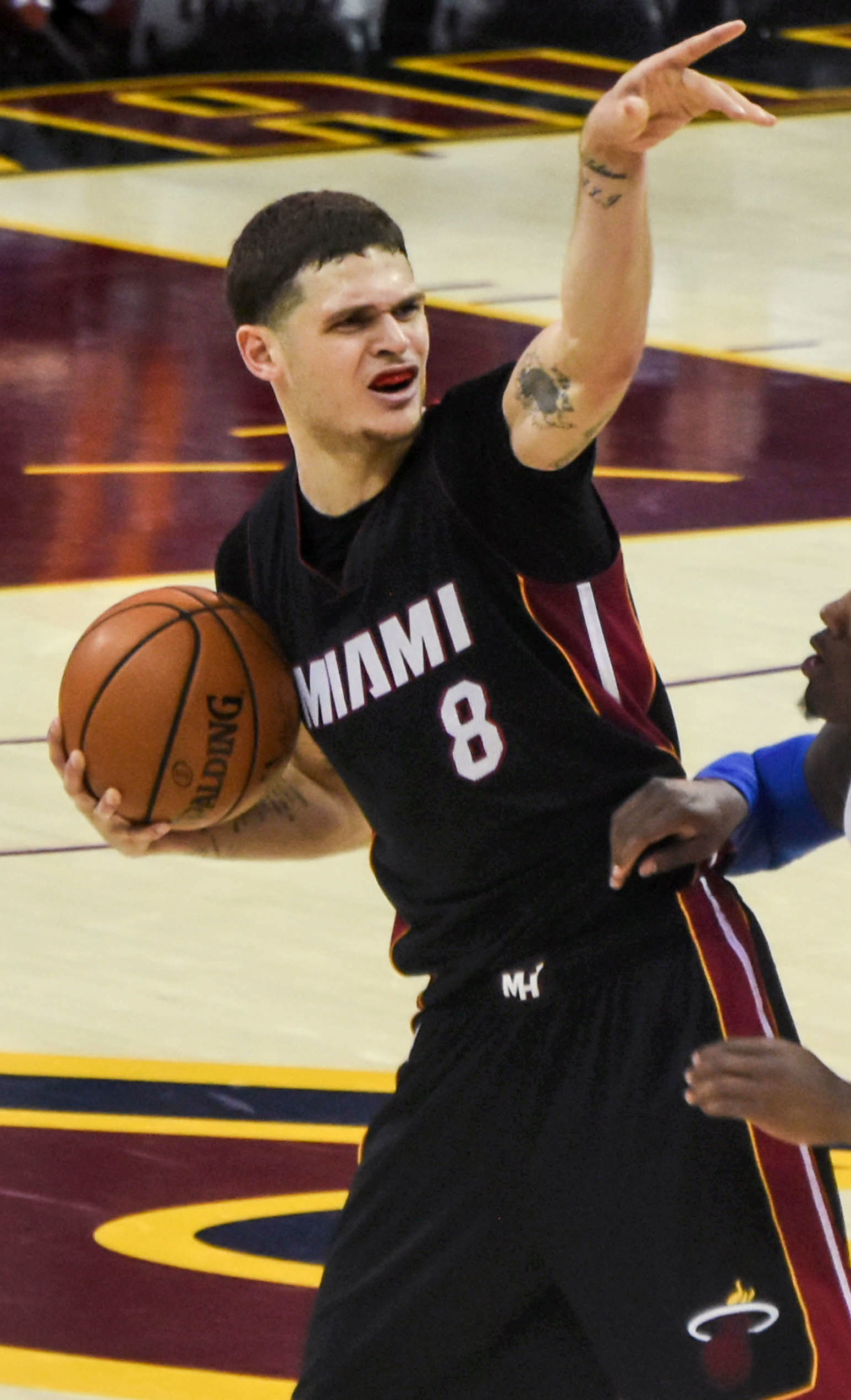
- Johnson with the Miami Heat in 2016

East Carolina Pirates
- Title: Assistant coach
- League: American

Personal information
- Born: May 7, 1992 (age 34) Grand Forks, North Dakota, U.S.
- Listed height: 6 ft 3 in (1.91 m)
- Listed weight: 186 lb (84 kg)

Career information
- High school: Saint Francis (Mountain View, California)
- College: Fresno State (2010–2014)
- NBA draft: 2014: undrafted
- Playing career: 2014–2023
- Position: Shooting guard / point guard
- Number: 8, 16, 10, 28

Career history

Playing
- 2014–2015: Sioux Falls Skyforce
- 2015–2019: Miami Heat
- 2019–2020: Phoenix Suns
- 2020–2021: Brooklyn Nets
- 2021–2022: Philadelphia 76ers
- 2022: San Antonio Spurs
- 2022–2023: Brisbane Bullets

Coaching
- 2025–2026: Fresno State (assistant)
- 2026–present: East Carolina

Career highlights
- Second-team All-MWC (2014)
- Stats at NBA.com
- Stats at Basketball Reference

Tyler Ryan Johnson (born May 7, 1992) is an American basketball assistant coach for the East Carolina Pirates of the American Conference. He is a former professional basketball player who played in the National Basketball Association (NBA) for the Miami Heat, Phoenix Suns, Brooklyn Nets, Philadelphia 76ers, and San Antonio Spurs. He played college basketball for Fresno State.

== Early life ==
Johnson attended St. Francis High School in Mountain View, California.

== College career ==
In his four-year career at Fresno State, Johnson appeared in 127 games (87 starts) and averaged 10.6 points, 4.8 rebounds, 2.4 assists and 1.1 steals in 27.9 minutes per game while shooting 45.6 percent from the field, 37.4 percent from three-point range and 71.6 percent from the free-throw line. He finished his career ranked number 16 on Fresno State's all-time scoring list with 1,346 career points. As a senior, he was named to the All-Mountain West Conference second team and shot 43.2 percent from three-point range, the sixth-highest single-season three-point field goal percentage in school history.

== Professional career ==
=== Sioux Falls Skyforce (2014–2015) ===
After going undrafted in the 2014 NBA draft, Johnson joined the Miami Heat for the 2014 NBA Summer League. On August 7, 2014, he signed with the Heat, but was later waived by the team on October 25. On November 3, he was acquired by the Sioux Falls Skyforce of the NBA Development League as an affiliate player of the Heat.

=== Miami Heat (2015) ===
On January 12, 2015, Johnson signed a 10-day contract with the Heat. Three days later, he made his NBA debut against the Golden State Warriors, appearing for 1:44 minutes and scoring two points on a pair of free throws.

=== Return to the Skyforce (2015) ===
On January 22, the Heat decided to not retain Johnson after his contract expired and two days later, he returned to the Skyforce.

=== Return to Miami (2015–2019) ===
Johnson later re-joined the Heat on January 29 as he signed another 10-day contract with the team. On February 8, he signed a two-year deal with the Heat. On March 2, he had a season-best game with 26 points and 4 steals in a 115–98 win over the Phoenix Suns. Five days later, he scored 24 points and played in a career-high 44 minutes off the bench as he helped the Heat defeat the Sacramento Kings, 114–109. He topped that minutes mark by playing in all 48 minutes of the Heat's season finale win over the Philadelphia 76ers.

On July 9, 2015, Johnson was sidelined for six weeks with a broken jaw that he sustained while playing for the Heat during the 2015 NBA Summer League. On December 9, 2015, he scored a season-high 20 points in a loss to the Charlotte Hornets. He later missed eight games during December with a shoulder injury. Johnson fought through his left shoulder pain during January before missing the team's final two games of the month after succumbing to the pain. After initially trying to avoid surgery, Johnson ultimately gave into the idea on February 1, 2016, a procedure that ruled him out for three months. He returned to action on May 1, coming off the bench for the final six minutes of the Heat's Game 7 win over the Charlotte Hornets in the first round of the playoffs.

After the 2015–16 season, Johnson became a restricted free agent. On July 6, 2016, he received a four-year, $50 million offer sheet from the Brooklyn Nets. Four days later, the Heat matched the Nets' contract offer, re-signing Johnson. On December 7, 2016, he scored a career-high 27 points in a 103–95 loss to the Atlanta Hawks. He topped that mark on December 20, scoring 32 points—the most any Heat reserve has ever scored in a game—in a 136–130 double overtime loss to the Orlando Magic. The previous Heat scoring record by a reserve was 29 points, by Voshon Lenard in 1999.

On December 30, 2017, Johnson scored 22 of his season-high 31 points in the third quarter of the Heat's 117–111 win over the Magic.

On December 23, 2018, Johnson scored 20 of his 25 points in the third quarter of the Heat's 115–91 win over the Magic.

=== Phoenix Suns (2019–2020) ===
On February 6, 2019, Johnson was traded, along with Wayne Ellington, to the Phoenix Suns in exchange for Ryan Anderson. On February 23, he scored a season-high 29 points in a 120–112 loss to the Atlanta Hawks. Two days later, he scored 18 points against his former team, the Miami Heat, to help the Suns snap a franchise-record 17-game losing streak to win 124–121. On April 4, 2019, Johnson was ruled out for the rest of the season after missing 10 games with right knee soreness and undergoing arthroscopic surgery. On February 9, 2020, Johnson was waived by the Suns.

=== Brooklyn Nets (2020–2021) ===
On June 24, 2020, Johnson signed with the Brooklyn Nets. On November 27, he re-signed with the Nets. In 39 games played with Brooklyn, he averaged 5.4 points, 2 rebounds, and 1.2 assists in an average of 17 minutes per game. In the Nets' elimination from the NBA playoffs against the eventual champion Milwaukee Bucks, Johnson totalled 4 points, 2 rebounds, and 5 assists in a combined 22 minutes of action. Johnson won praise for his personality fit and work with the Nets second unit, but Brooklyn chose not to re-sign him in free agency.

=== Philadelphia 76ers (2021–2022) ===
On December 22, 2021, Johnson signed a 10-day contract with the Philadelphia 76ers, via the hardship exemption. He appeared in three games and averaged 3.7 points and 2.0 rebounds per game.

=== San Antonio Spurs (2022) ===
On January 6, 2022, Johnson signed a 10-day contract with the San Antonio Spurs. He appeared in three games, and averaged 2 points, 2 rebounds, and 1.7 assists per game for the Spurs.

=== Brisbane Bullets (2022–2023) ===
On July 30, 2022, Johnson signed with the Brisbane Bullets in Australia for the 2022–23 NBL season.

== Coaching career ==
On June 11, 2026, Johnson was hired as an assistant coach and the director of player development for East Carolina University.

== Career statistics ==
Legend
GP	Games played	GS	Games started	MPG	Minutes per game
FG%	Field goal percentage	3P%	3-point field goal percentage	FT%	Free throw percentage
RPG	Rebounds per game	APG	Assists per game	SPG	Steals per game
BPG	Blocks per game	PPG	Points per game	**Bold**	Career high

=== NBA ===
==== Regular season ====
Year	Team	GP	GS	MPG	FG%	3P%	FT%	RPG	APG	SPG	BPG	PPG
2014–15	Miami	32	2	18.8	.419	.375	.681	2.5	1.3	1.0	.3	5.9
2015–16	Miami	36	5	24.0	**.488**	.380	.797	3.0	2.2	.7	.4	8.7
2016–17	Miami	**73**	0	29.8	.433	.372	.768	**4.0**	3.2	**1.2**	.6	**13.7**
2017–18	Miami	72	**39**	28.5	.435	.367	.822	3.4	2.3	.8	.5	11.7
2018–19	Miami	44	10	25.5	.426	.353	.693	2.8	2.5	.9	.5	10.8
2018–19	Phoenix	13	12	**31.2**	.368	.321	.872	**4.0**	**4.2**	1.1	.5	11.1
2019–20	Phoenix	31	3	16.6	.380	.289	.750	1.7	1.6	.4	.3	5.7
2019–20	Brooklyn	8	4	24.3	.405	.389	**1.000**	3.0	3.0	.5	.1	12.0
2020–21	Brooklyn	39	3	17.5	.393	.364	.857	2.0	1.2	.4	.0	5.4
2021–22	Philadelphia	3	0	12.7	.400	**.429**	—	2.0	.7	.3	.3	3.7
2021–22	San Antonio	3	0	17.7	.200	.333	—	2.0	1.7	.7	**.7**	2.0
Career		354	78	24.6	.426	.360	.779	3.0	2.3	.8	.4	9.8

==== Playoffs ====
Year	Team	GP	GS	MPG	FG%	3P%	FT%	RPG	APG	SPG	BPG	PPG
2016	Miami	5	0	12.2	.455	.500	.727	1.4	1.6	.2	.0	4.2
2018	Miami	5	**5**	16.2	**.538**	**.600**	.857	1.6	.8	**.4**	.0	8.0
2020	Brooklyn	4	2	**23.3**	.457	.393	**1.000**	**1.8**	**2.3**	.0	**.3**	**13.8**
2021	Brooklyn	**8**	0	8.6	.353	.273	**1.000**	.8	.6	.3	.0	2.1
Career		22	7	13.8	.460	.418	.818	1.3	1.2	.2	.0	6.0

=== College ===
Year	Team	GP	GS	MPG	FG%	3P%	FT%	RPG	APG	SPG	BPG	PPG
2010–11	Fresno State	31	1	16.9	.441	.143	.540	2.9	2.0	1.1	.3	4.4
2011–12	Fresno State	33	23	29.6	.422	.315	.686	4.6	2.5	**1.3**	.3	9.3
2012–13	Fresno State	29	28	29.6	.461	.402	.709	4.1	2.0	.9	.2	12.1
2013–14	Fresno State	**35**	**35**	**33.6**	**.479**	**.432**	**.805**	**7.3**	**2.9**	1.0	**.4**	**15.9**
Career		128	87	27.6	.456	.372	.716	4.8	2.4	1.1	.3	10.5

== Personal life ==
Johnson is the son of Jennifer and Milton Johnson, and has four siblings: Brandon, Lauren, Logan, and Gabe. His mother is in the United States Air Force. Johnson's biggest hobby off the court is cooking.
