= Rasmus Bach =

Danish-Australian basketball player

Personal information
- Born: 22 July 1995 (age 31) Denmark
- Listed height: 193 cm (6 ft 4 in)
- Listed weight: 84 kg (185 lb)

Career information
- High school: Anderson (Austin, Texas)
- College: Fort Lewis (2013–2018)
- NBA draft: 2018: undrafted
- Playing career: 2014–2023
- Position: Shooting guard

Career history
- 2014: South West Metro Pirates
- 2018–2020: Randers Cimbria
- 2020–2022: New Zealand Breakers
- 2022–2023: Logan Thunder
- 2022–2023: Brisbane Bullets

Career highlights
- 2× First-team All-RMAC (2017, 2018); Second-team All-RMAC (2016); RMAC Freshman of the Year (2015)

Rasmus Bach (born 22 July 1995) is a Danish-Australian former professional basketball player. Born in Denmark, Bach grew up in Australia and then attended high school in the United States. Between 2013 and 2018, he played college basketball for the Fort Lewis Skyhawks. He began his professional career in Denmark before joining the New Zealand Breakers of the Australian NBL in 2020. After a season with the Brisbane Bullets, he retired in 2023. Bach has represented the Denmark national team and holds an Australian passport.

== Early life and career ==
Bach was born in Denmark. He moved to Australia at the age of two and lived there for over a decade. He played junior representative basketball for the Logan Thunder from 2005 to 2008 before moving to the United States as a twelve-year-old.

Bach attended Anderson High School in Austin, Texas, where he played basketball for four seasons. He was named first team all-district and first team all-region as well as Academic all-state and all-district.

In 2014, Bach returned to Australia and played a season in the Queensland Basketball League for the South West Metro Pirates. In 16 games, he averaged 13.1 points, 5.1 rebounds, 1.9 assists and 1.1 steals per game.

== College career ==
Bach made his college basketball debut for the Fort Lewis Skyhawks in the 2013–14 season, but saw action in just two games before suffering a season-ending knee injury.

As a redshirt freshman in 2014–15, Bach was named RMAC Freshman of the Year and RMAC All-Academic First Team. He started all 29 games and averaged 10.9 points, 4.2 rebounds and 2.4 assists per game. He scored a season-high 20 points against Adams State on 31 January 2015.

As a sophomore in 2015–16, Bach was named RMAC All-Academic First Team and All-RMAC Second Team. He started 15 of 32 games and averaged 14.0 points and a team-best 5.1 rebounds per game. He scored a career-high 29 points against South Dakota School of Mines on 5 February 2016.

As a junior in 2016–17, Bach was named RMAC All-Academic First Team and All-RMAC First Team. He started all 33 games and averaged 18.2 points, 5.8 rebounds and 2.5 assists per game. He tied his career high with 29 points against Colorado Mines on 4 March 2017.

As a senior in 2017–18, Bach was named RMAC All-Academic First Team for the fourth straight year and All-RMAC First Team for the second straight year. He started all 31 games and averaged 14.9 points, 5.1 rebounds, 3.6 assists and 1.0 steals per game.

== Professional career ==
=== Randers Cimbria (2018–2020) ===
In July 2018, Bach signed with Randers Cimbria of the Danish Basketligaen. In the 2018–19 season, he averaged 10.1 points, 3.8 rebounds, 1.5 assists and 1.3 steals in 33 games. In the 2019–20 season, he averaged 12.5 points, 6.1 rebounds, 2.3 assists and 1.4 steals in 24 games.

Bach started the 2020–21 Basketligaen season with Randers Cimbria, averaging 8.8 points, 4.6 rebounds, 2.6 assists and 1.1 steals in eight games.

=== New Zealand Breakers (2020–2022) ===
Bach returned to Australia in December 2020 to play for the New Zealand Breakers of the National Basketball League (NBL). In 36 games during the 2020–21 NBL season, he averaged 4.8 points and 1.7 rebounds per game. With the Breakers in 2021–22, he averaged 2.9 points and 1.8 rebounds in 18 games.

=== Logan Thunder and Brisbane Bullets (2022–2023) ===
On 3 March 2022, Bach signed with the Logan Thunder of the NBL1 North for the 2022 NBL1 season. In 20 games, he averaged 15.55 points, 5.95 rebounds, 3.8 assists and 1.05 steals per game.

On 7 September 2022, Bach signed with the Brisbane Bullets for the 2022–23 NBL season as a nominated replacement player. In 19 games, he averaged 3.0 points and 1.6 rebounds per game.

On 1 February 2023, Bach re-signed with Thunder for the 2023 NBL1 North season. In 18 games, he averaged 13.33 points, 5.83 rebounds, 3.61 assists and 1.11 steals per game.

On 15 June 2023, Bach announced his retirement from the NBL.

== National team career ==
Bach made his debut for the Denmark national team in 2020.

== Personal life ==
Bach's father and mother, Peter and Janni Bach, are former international handball players who played for the Australian national team at the 2000 Summer Olympics.

Bach holds an Australian passport.

In August 2023, Bach and his wife, Lindley, relocated to the United States as he embarked on a new career in sports business.
