= Gorjok Gak =

Australian basketball player (born 1996)

No. 24 – Niagara River Lions
- Position: Center
- League: CEBL

Personal information
- Born: 9 November 1996 (age 30) Egypt
- Listed height: 211 cm (6 ft 11 in)
- Listed weight: 102 kg (225 lb)

Career information
- High school: St Augustine's College (Sydney, New South Wales); Victory Rock Prep (Bradenton, Florida)
- College: Florida (2016–2019); California Baptist (2020–2021)
- NBA draft: 2021: undrafted
- Playing career: 2021–present

Career history
- 2021–2022: Nymburk
- 2022–2023: Brisbane Bullets
- 2023: Willetton Tigers
- 2023–2024: South East Melbourne Phoenix
- 2024: Rockingham Flames
- 2024–2025: Tasmania JackJumpers
- 2025: Peristeri
- 2025: Casey Cavaliers
- 2025: South East Melbourne Phoenix
- 2025–2026: Sichuan Blue Whales
- 2026–present: Niagara River Lions

Career highlights
- Czech NBL champion (2022); 2× All-NBL1 West First Team (2023, 2024); NBL1 West Defensive Player of the Year (2023); NBL1 West All-Defensive Team (2024); Second-team All-WAC (2021); WAC All-Defensive Team (2021); WAC All-Newcomer Team (2021)

Gorjok Gak (born 9 November 1996) is an Australian professional basketball player for the Niagara River Lions of the Canadian Elite Basketball League (CEBL). He played college basketball for the Florida Gators and California Baptist Lancers before starting his professional career in the Czech Republic, where he won a championship with Basketball Nymburk. He debuted in the National Basketball League (NBL) in 2022 and has played for the Brisbane Bullets, South East Melbourne Phoenix and Tasmania JackJumpers.

== Early life ==
Gak was born in Egypt to South Sudanese refugees, but his family soon decided to leave the country and move to Sydney, New South Wales. He began playing basketball in Sydney and participated in the annual South Sudanese Australian National Classic. He attended St Augustine's College before moving to the United States in 2014. His friend, Deng Adel, convinced him to play high school basketball at Victory Rock Prep in Bradenton, Florida.

Gak graduated from Victory Rock Prep in 2016 and averaged 13.9 points and 9.3 rebounds in his final season. He helped Victory Rock Prep to a championship in the team's season-ending Grind Session National Tournament.

== College career ==
Gak committed to Oklahoma State to play for Travis Ford, but he was released from his letter-of-intent after Ford was fired at the end of the 2015–16 season. Gak subsequently joined the Florida Gators in April 2016.

Gak was initially ruled ineligible by the NCAA at the beginning of his rookie season, due to questions about the number of games he played at Victory Rock Prep. His eligibility was restored in full following an appeal. As a freshman for Florida in 2016–17, Gak saw limited minutes and totaled 23 points and 23 rebounds in 15 appearances.

As a sophomore in 2017–18, Gak battled through knee soreness and swelling all season and averaged 2.2 points and 2.4 rebounds in 29 games.

Following off-season knee surgery, Gak redshirted the 2018–19 season. He returned to the Gators for the 2019–20 season but suffered a dislocated shoulder in a practice in October. He appeared in two games while battling various injuries before leaving the team at the end of December.

In April 2020, Gak joined the California Baptist Lancers as a graduate transfer. In the 2020–21 season, Gak played and started in all 23 games and averaged 13.5 points and 10.3 rebounds per game. He scored in double figures 19 times and recorded 10 double-doubles. He scored a career-high 26 points against Long Beach State on 23 January 2021. He was subsequently named All-WAC Second Team, WAC All-Defensive Team and WAC All-Newcomer Team.

== Professional career ==
In July 2021, Gak signed with Basketball Nymburk of the Czech NBL for the 2021–22 season. He helped the team win the Czech League championship and averaged 13.5 points, 10.1 rebounds, 1.9 assists and 1.7 blocks per game.

On 6 July 2022, Gak signed with the Brisbane Bullets of the National Basketball League (NBL) for the 2022–23 season. In round 13 against Melbourne United, he recorded 18 points, 13 rebounds, three assists, two steals and a block. In 25 games, he averaged 4.6 points, 4.1 rebounds and 1.1 assists per game.

Gak joined the Willetton Tigers of the NBL1 West for the 2023 season. He earned All-NBL1 West First Team honours and was named the league's Defensive Player of the Year. In 22 games, he averaged 20.1 points, 12.2 rebounds and 2.5 assists per game.

On 10 April 2023, Gak signed with the South East Melbourne Phoenix for the 2023–24 NBL season. He endured an injury-hit season, playing just 17 games and averaging 5.4 points and 4.9 rebounds per game.

Gak joined the Rockingham Flames for the 2024 NBL1 West season. He was named to the All-NBL1 West First Team for the second straight season and earned NBL1 West All-Defensive Team honours. In 20 games, he averaged 20.4 points, 10.95 rebounds, 2.25 assists and 1.2 blocks per game.

On 18 April 2024, Gak signed a two-year deal with the Tasmania JackJumpers, with the second year containing a club option. He played 24 games during 2024–25 NBL season, averaging 4 points per game. On 6 March 2025, the club chose to decline the second-year team option on his contract.

On 22 March 2025, Gak signed with Peristeri of the Greek Basketball League for the rest of the 2024–25 season. In five games, he averaged 2.0 points and 1.0 rebounds per game.

On 8 May 2025, Gak signed with the Casey Cavaliers of the NBL1 South for the rest of the 2025 season. In 13 games, he averaged 6.54 points, 3.54 rebounds and 1.0 assists per game.

On 17 May 2025, Gak signed with the South East Melbourne Phoenix for the 2025–26 NBL season, returning to the team for a second stint. On 18 December, Gak was released by the Phoenix so he could pursue opportunities overseas.

On 22 December 2025, Gak signed with the Sichuan Blue Whales of the Chinese Basketball Association for the rest of the 2025–26 season.

In July 2026, Gak joined the Niagara River Lions of the Canadian Elite Basketball League (CEBL) for the rest of the 2026 season.

== National team ==
Gak played for the Australian University National Team in 2017 at the World University Games in Taipei. In eight games, he averaged 11.1 points, 8.4 rebounds and 1.1 assists per game.

== Personal life ==
Gak is the son of Ajok Langar and Matur Gak and his siblings are Deng, Nyapath, Akoldah, Adeng and Ayen. Two of his brothers, Deng and Akoldah, are also professional basketball players. His uncle, Longar Longar, played basketball at Oklahoma and his aunt, Nytar Longar, played basketball at Buffalo.
