= Freseros de Irapuato =

- League: LNBP
- Founded: 2023; 3 years ago
- History: Freseros de Irapuato (2023–present)
- Arena: Inforum
- Capacity: 3,000
- Location: Irapuato, Guanajuato
- Team colors: Navy blue, red, and white
- President: Alejandro Marcocchio Romero
- Head coach: Christopher Gutiérrez
- Ownership: Proabejas A.C.
| Home | Away |

The Freseros de Irapuato (English: Irapuato Strawberry Growers) is a Mexican professional basketball team based in Irapuato, Guanajuato. The Freseros compete in the Liga Nacional de Baloncesto Profesional (LNBP), the top professional basketball league in Mexico, as a member of the league's West Division. The team plays its home games at the Inforum, with a capacity of 3,000 spectators.

The Freseros are the first professional basketball team to play in Irapuato.

== History ==
On 20 February 2023, the team was presented at a press conference in Irapuato, Guanajuato as an expansion team in the Liga Nacional de Baloncesto Profesional (LNBP), with a women's team debuting that May and a men's team debuting in August. It was announced that they would be playing at the Inforum, which would be renovated to accommodate 3,000 spectators. The team president, Alejandro Marcocchio Romero, who is also president of the defending champion Abejas de León, stated that he was contacted by the municipal president of Irapuato, Lorena Alfaro García, about bringing a team to the city. The project was undertaken as a collaboration between private investors and the municipal and state governments, with the Guanajuato state government apportioning MXN$18 million for the Inforum renovations.

After an 0–8 start to their inaugural season, the team fired head coach Steve Walton and hired Walter McCarty for the role.

== Players ==
=== Current roster ===
Note: Flags indicate national team eligibility at FIBA-sanctioned events. Players may hold other non-FIBA nationalities not displayed.

Freseros de Irapuato roster
Players
Coaches

| Pos. | No. | Nat. | Name | Ht. | Wt. |
|---|---|---|---|---|---|
| SF | 0 | (Canada) | James, Gatluak | 1.98 m (6 ft 6 in) | 100 kg (220 lb) |
| SF | 1 | (United States) | Brown, Zach | 1.98 m (6 ft 6 in) | 97 kg (214 lb) |
| SG | 3 | (United States) | Garrett Jr., Billy | 1.98 m (6 ft 6 in) | 97 kg (214 lb) |
| SG | 5 | (Mexico) | Hernández, Diego |
| SF | 7 | (United States) | Fountain, Derek | 2.05 m (6 ft 9 in) | 105 kg (231 lb) |
| PG | 8 | (Mexico) | Gallegos, Iván |
| PG | 10 | (Mexico) | López, David |
| SF | 11 | (United States) | Millin, Tyler | 2.00 m (6 ft 7 in) | 100 kg (220 lb) |
| SG | 13 | (Venezuela) | Gutiérrez, Christians | 1.90 m (6 ft 3 in) | 84 kg (185 lb) |
| SG | 21 | (Venezuela) | Pirela, Franger | 1.82 m (6 ft 0 in) | 80 kg (176 lb) |
| SF | 22 | (Mexico) | García, Raúl | 1.92 m (6 ft 4 in) | 90 kg (198 lb) |
| PF | 23 | (United States) | Rose, Kyson | 2.06 m (6 ft 9 in) | 105 kg (231 lb) |
| PG | 26 | (Mexico) | Gutiérrez, Emiliano |

Head coach

- (Venezuela) Christopher Gutiérrez

Assistant coach(es)

- (United States) Benjamin Bliss

Legend

- (C) Team captain
- Injured

- Roster
Updated: December 7, 2019

== Notable players ==
Note: Flags indicate national team eligibility at FIBA-sanctioned events. Players may hold other non-FIBA nationalities not displayed.

Criteria

To appear in this section a player must have either:

- Set a club record or won an individual award while at the club
- Played at least one official international match for their national team at any time
- Played at least one official NBA match at any time.

- (United States) Jeff Ayres
