= Wigley =

Wigley may refer to:

== Places ==
- Wigley, Derbyshire, England
- Wigley, Hampshire, England, on the River Blackwater
- Wigley, Bromfield, Shropshire, England

== People ==
- Bob Wigley, English businessman
- Dafydd Wigley, Baron Wigley (born 1943), born David Wigley, Welsh politician
- George J. Wigley (1825–1866), English journalist and supporter of Catholic causes
- Sir Harry Wigley (1913–1980), New Zealand pilot, adventurer and tourism entrepreneur
- Jane Wigley (1820–1883), British photographer
- Richard E. Wigley (1918–1998), American farmer and politician
- Rodolph Wigley (1881–1946), New Zealand tourism pioneer
- Steve Wigley (born 1961), English (soccer) football coach and former player
- Thomas Francis Wigley (c. 1854–1933), lawyer and horse racing official in South Australia
- Thomas Henry Wigley (1825–1895), South Australian farmer then New Zealand politician
- Tom Wigley (born 1940), Australian climate scientist
- William Wigley (1826–1890), South Australian yachtsman, mayor and politician
