= Bonnar =

Bonnar is a surname. Notable people with the surname include:

- Colm Bonnar (born 1964), Irish former hurling player
- Conal Bonnar (born 1969), Irish hurling player
- Cormac Bonnar (born 1959), Irish hurling player
- Joanne Bonnar, Scottish television news reporter
- John James Bonnar (1818–1905), headmaster and lawyer in South Australia and New South Wales
- Joseph Bonnar (1948–2017), English rugby league footballer
- Mark Bonnar (born 1968), Scottish actor
- Scott Bonnar (c. 1893–1961), built lawnmowers in South Australia
- Stephan Bonnar (1977–2022), American mixed martial arts fighter

== See also ==
- Bonar (name)
- Bonner (disambiguation)
