= Bill Simpson =

Bill or Billy Simpson may refer to:

- Billy Simpson (jockey) (c. 1840–1873), South Australian jockey
- Billy Simpson (footballer, born 1878) (1878–1962), English football player for Sunderland and Lincoln City
- Billy Simpson (footballer, born 1929) (1929–2017), Northern Ireland international football player
- Bill Simpson (actor) (1931–1986), Scottish actor
- Bill Simpson (racing driver) (1940–2019), American racecar driver
- Bill Simpson (American football) (born 1951), American football defensive back
- Billy Simpson (singer) (born 1987), Indonesian singer-songwriter

== See also ==
- William Simpson (disambiguation)
- Will Simpson (disambiguation)
