= William Wigley =

Australian politician

William Rodolph Wigley (c. 1826 – 6 May 1890) was a lawyer and politician in the British colony of South Australia.

W. R. Wigley was born in England to Henry Rodolph Wigley, who emigrated to South Australia with some of his family on the Schah, arriving in January 1837. His father, a lawyer, was appointed public prosecutor that same year, and later filled the posts of police magistrate, stipendiary magistrate, and Commissioner of Insolvency.

William left England some ten years after his father, arriving aboard the John Bartlett July 1847, trained for the legal profession, worked with J. H. Richman (c. 1789–1864) of Richman & Wigley, Clark's buildings, Hindley Street, and was articled in 1851 to Hardy & James, and on being admitted to the bar worked for Matthew Smith then W. C. Belt and L. M. Cullen as Belt, Cullen & Wigley. Wigley also worked with H. B. T. Strangways. He took a year off to visit the Victorian diggings during the gold rush, and was fairly successful. Belt left the partnership, and in 1877 Cullen retired, and Wigley took into partnership the young S. H. Bleechmore. He was appointed Stipendiary Magistrate in 1889.

He was closely connected with the Glenelg Corporation from 1855, when he was appointed Town Clerk, to his last year, almost without a break. He served as councillor (1867–1872, 1875–1881, 1883–1884, 1886–1888), including two stints as mayor (1870, 1875–1878), and was noted for advocating public parks in the district. He was an enthusiast for public swimming facilities and chairman of the Glenelg Bathing Company until his death.

He was involved with the Volunteer Defence movement and appointed Captain of the Glenelg company for many years. He was for a time chairman of the Glenelg Institute, vice president of the Glenelg Literary Society, and a prominent Freemason. He was also a member of the Glenelg Yacht Club.

He was elected to the South Australian House of Assembly seat of Albert and sat from July 1875 to March 1878. He then stood for the seat of West Adelaide but was unsuccessful.

He died of pneumonia at his home after a few weeks' illness, though he had been suffering poor health for some years.

== Family ==
Henry Rodolph Wigley (c. 1794 – 19 October 1876), Esq., S.M. was married to Sarah Elizabeth Wigley (c. 1797 – 1 July 1872). Among their family were:

- William Rodolph Wigley (c. 1826 – 6 May 1890) married Mary Letitia Longfield Creagh on 3 June 1862 and lived at "St. Leonards", Glenelg. Their children included:

- Mary Isabella Strangways Wigley (3 July 1863 – c. October 1910) married Tom Scott (–) on 24 November 1908
- Henry Vandeleur Wigley (25 November 1865 – 30 October 1927) married Isabella Ellen Reid (29 February 1872 –) on 6 October 1894; they divorced in 1900. He married again, to Marion Dove Dale on 2 June 1916.
- Florence Margaret Wigley (11 May 1867 – 1941) married Edward Chisholm Field (–) on 25 November 1908
- Constance Laura Wigley (8 March 1869 –) married William Colley Reid in Perth, WA, on 10 March 1902
- Sarah Georgina Wigley (7 March 1871 – 1960) married Charles Percy Cornish (– 16 April 1947) on 4 September 1901
- Francis Rodolph Wigley (1875–1960) married Mary Young Barker (– 2 June 1934) on 6 December 1915
- Josephine Lucie Cordelia Wigley (1877–1961) married Dr. Bronte Smeaton (6 October 1873 – 1956) on 18 May 1904. Bronte was a son of banker Thomas D. Smeaton, for a few years medical superintendent of Adelaide Hospital, and prominent citizen of Mount Barker.
- Osborne Dawson "Jack" Wigley (1879–1947) married Priscilla Olive Rawlins ( – ) on 17 April 1907

- Maria Cordelia Wigley ( – ) married H. B. T. Strangways in 1861

- Cordelia Elizabeth Mary Strangways (1864–1886)

- James Francis Wigley (died 1884) was married to Robina (died 1909). He was a prominent businessman, and lived at Brougham Place, North Adelaide. He was a founder of the Adelaide Club.

- William Henry Wigley (? – 13 October 1924), married Norah "Nellie" White ( – ) on 16 September 1889, lived on Military Road, Largs, was publican and councillor for Largs ward (1890–1891, 1893–1895) in the Semaphore Council.
- eldest daughter Laura Robina Wigley ( – 26 June 1932) married Ben Henry Beaven ( – 31 July 1923) on 6 June 1883.
- Thomas Francis Wigley (c. 1854 – 14 January 1933) married Lilian Sturt Richardson on 9 October 1890. Lilian's mother was a daughter of Hon. John Crozier. Tom was a lawyer and founder of South Australian Jockey Club, for a few years part owner of Morphettville racecourse, and Tattersalls Club official.

- Dr John Edwin Mackon "Mac" Wigley, eminent skin specialist in London

- Robert S. Wigley (1864 – 20 April 1926) of Wirra Wirra winery, McLaren Vale.

- Thomas Wigley (1825–1895) was a New Zealand MLC and father of transport and tourism entrepreneur Rodolph Wigley (1881–1946).
