= Elizabeth Whitby =

19th-century Australian who founded a school for girls in Adelaide

Elizabeth Whitby (c. 1803 – 12 November 1888) was founder and principal of a school for girls in Carrington Street, Adelaide, one of the first in the Colony of South Australia, founded in 1848.

== History ==
Elizabeth Whitby (née Castleden) was a daughter of (Baptist) Rev. James Castleden (c. 1778 – 5 June 1854), of Hampstead, London, born c. 1803. She married Joseph Whitby (after 1851), lived for a time in Yorkshire, and had a small family. Joseph Whitby, Elizabeth and their four sons emigrated to Australia, arriving in Adelaide aboard Competitor in October 1848. She founded a school for girls in Carrington Street in that year. The fate of Joseph Whitby is as yet not known. Whitby advertised that she was prepared

"to receive and instruct Young Ladies in every branch of mental and elegant education. Vacancies for one or two Boarders."

A year later her advertisements were more informative:

CARRINGTON HOUSE ESTABLISHMENT, South Adelaide.—Conducted by Mrs. WHITBY and qualified Assistants.
In this long-established Seminary the various improved systems of Education are combined and modified, in order to unite the comforts of home with the strictest discipline in the development of the mental faculties. Terms, 40 guineas per annum. One or two Vacancies for Boarders.
The Course of Instruction comprises—Ancient and Modern History, Grammar; Geography, Physical and Moral, with the use of the Globes; Composition, Writing and Arithmetic, Fancy Work in general. Drawing in Chalk and Pencil; Watercolour, Landscape, and Flower Painting; Music, Singing, Dancing, and the French and German Languages.

In William Wyatt's 1851 survey of Government-approved and subsidised schools, of which there were 79 in South Australia, Whitby was receiving grants for 4 boys and 22 girls, and on the day of inspection she had 27 girls under instruction.

The school operated continuously from 1848 to 1878.

== Family ==
Whitby's four sons were:

- Joseph James Whitby (1838 – March 1875), generally known as J. J. Whitby, was educated at Francis Haire's Academy on Hindmarsh Square, then entered the office of solicitors Bartley, Bakewell, & Stow, and remained there for ten years, in the latter period articled to William Bakewell, then to William Wren, of Boucaut & Wren. On Wren's death in 1864 Whitby served out his term with James Boucaut, and after being called to the bar entered into partnership with J. J. Bonnar at Mount Barker. After a year, having fallen out with Bonnar, he joined Boucaut, but only stayed with him for a year. He then carried on business on his own account, and had the reputation as sound and able lawyer. From around 1872 he was mostly involved in drafting Bills for the SA Government, work for which he showed particular aptitude.

Whitby married Frances Jane "Fanny" Wyly (1842 – 17 September 1924) at Christ Church, North Adelaide on 2 May 1866. Their children include:

- Geoffrey Castleden Whitby (26 Dec 1869 – 5 November 1953) married Lilian Rhoda Pickersgill on 30 April 1901, died in Perth
- Frances Elizabeth Whitby (2 Jun 1871 – 1916) died in Black Rock, County Dublin, Ireland
- Henrietta Lilian Whitby (12 Feb 1873 – 27 May 1882)

Whitby accompanied Judge Wearing to the Northern Territory as Acting Crown Solicitor, and was one of those lost in the Gothenburg disaster. Frances followed her mother-in-law as headmistress of her own private school in North Adelaide, later in Prospect. After the death of her youngest daughter Henrietta in 1882 she returned to Ireland, most likely accompanied by her daughter Frances, and died in Black Rock, Dublin.

- Francis John "Frank" Whitby (c. 1840 – 12 January 1909), generally referred to as Frank or F. J. Whitby, was born in Yorkshire and, after arrival in Adelaide, was educated at Haire's academy and at Adelaide Educational Institution. His first employment was with James Robin & Co. of Grenfell Street, then entered the service of J. H. Angas, first at Collingrove, and when Angas took up Mount Remarkable, Whitby was employed there. He subsequently acted as manager of Wirrealpa, Stewart's Creek, and many other of Angas's stations in the north. When the Willowie Land and Pastoral Association took over those properties, Whitby remained as manager of Willowie Station, Mount Remarkable and general overseer of other northern stations until 1889 (? elsewhere c 1898), when he retired. He was immensely popular among a wide circle of friends. Among his other activities were:

- He was for many years chairman of the Port Germein District Council.
- He was appointed Justice of the Peace and was frequently called upon to act as magistrate at Mt. Remarkable, and after retirement sat on the Bench of the Adelaide Police Court.
- He was a lay reader of the Church of England at Melrose, and frequently conducted the services in the absence of the incumbent.
- After retirement from station management he made a trip to England, then settled at Glenelg. Subsequently be visited Europe, America, and Japan several times.
- He was regarded as one of the State's best authorities on sheep, and after he retired his advice on selection and purchase of flocks was often sought by station owners.
Whitby, never married. George Downer, fellow student at Haire's Academy and lifelong friend, said of him:

"Mr. Whitby and I were little boys together 60 years ago, and he and his brothers and mother were always my very dear friends. In common with his brother he had the gift of warm geniality, of absolute homeliness of manner, and of being incapable of doing a tricky or wrong thing, and a sense of humour that was absolutely original.".

- Alfred Knight Whitby (c. 1844 – 29 July 1898) was a solicitor in the colony of South Australia, the subject of several sensational reports of altercations. He was educated at Adelaide Educational Institution. He was employed as a clerk in the Audit Office, and in August 1865 left to enter private practice. His friend Charles E. Aldridge (1858– ), who was with the Post Office, left his employment at the Post Office at the same time, later to follow his brother James Henry Aldridge in the hotel business, taking the Crown and Sceptre Hotel on King William Street near the Railway Station in 1883. George Sydney Aldridge, another brother, was for many years Chairman of the Adelaide Stock Exchange.

Clerk for Way in 1866?
In August 1876 he was appointed Commissioner for taking affidavits in the Supreme Court. In March 1879 Charles Mann took him on as partner, styled as Mann & Whitby; Whitby representing the firm in Jamestown.
Whitby is remembered for two his involvement in two quite public altercations:
- It was reported that on the evening of Thursday 11 May 1882, solicitor A. K. Whitby horsewhipped one E. J. Eyre, for sending a report to The Advertiser of Terowie Police Court proceedings in which Whitby was the defendant.
The facts of the case were somewhat more prosaic: The Clerk of the Court, Edmund John Eyre, laid an information against Whitby, who was no teetotaller, for using indecent language, but before the case was heard, Whitby apologized to Eyre, who agreed to withdraw the information if Whitby paid the court costs.
A few days later, a report appeared in The Advertiser, and Whitby, having found out that Eyre's son had furnished the report, procured a horsewhip, and "chastised him accordingly", young Eyre retaliating with his fists. Both men emerged from the affray little the worse for the encounter.

Edmund John Eyre (14 March 1825 – 1 December 1892) was baptised in Strood, Kent, a son of Daniel Eyre (c. 1778– c. 1855) and arrived in South Australia c. 1851. He married Katherine Louisa Good ( – 1893) at Trinity Church in 1852. Their children included Edmund James Rendell Eyre (1854– ), Charles Frederick Eyre (1860–1932), Florence Eyre (1862– ) married Francis Bayes in 1898, Henry Vernon Eyre (1854– ), Katherine Louisa Eyre (1866–1893), Frances Eyre (1868–1956), Arthur Ernest Eyre (1871–1944), Emily Eyre (1874– ) married George Thom in 1921. He was publican, Northern Hotel, North Road in 1852. He lived on the Lefevre Peninsula, and was engaged as a shipping reporter for the South Australian Register (replaced by Richard Jagoe in March 1858). He also served as Health Officer 1855–1857. He then started in business as a flour merchant. His brother Daniel Eyre (died 1862) joined him in August 1857 by which time he was insolvent. Inundations of his Port Adelaide property resulted in substantial losses and his brother's illness took him away from the business and he was forced to plead insolvency. He was appointed Crown Lands Ranger sometime before June 1862. In 1874 he was appointed Clerk at the Local Court at Jamestown, which included duties at Peterborough and Terowie. In 1878 he was again forced to plead insolvency. He died at Peterborough while on Court business. One report has him distantly related to the famous explorer.

- D. C. F. Moodie and his wife Matilda, née Hunt, were at one stage on friendly terms with Whitby. In 1880 Moodie had become famous for having on 12 June 1880 thrashed A. T. Clark MLC, proprietor of the Williamstown Advertiser, for a libel on Queen Victoria published in his paper. On his return on 3 August 1880 he found that Whitby had given advice to Mrs. Moodie regarding separation from her husband, who was known to be violent towards her. Moodie promptly sought out the lawyer at Aldridge's Prince Alfred Hotel and in front of witnesses knocked him to the floor. For this assault he was fined £5.
He died without fanfare: a week before he had become ill and he was taken to Miss Tibbits's Hospital, where he received all attention possible, attended by his lifelong friend Charles Aldridge, and died on Saturday morning at the age of 54. His remains were buried in the North-road Cemetery.

=== E. B. Whitby ===
Youngest brother Edward Ball Whitby (c. 1844 – 14 September 1866) also chose the life of a pastoralist; he died at Callanna Station.
