= Herbert Bristow Hughes =

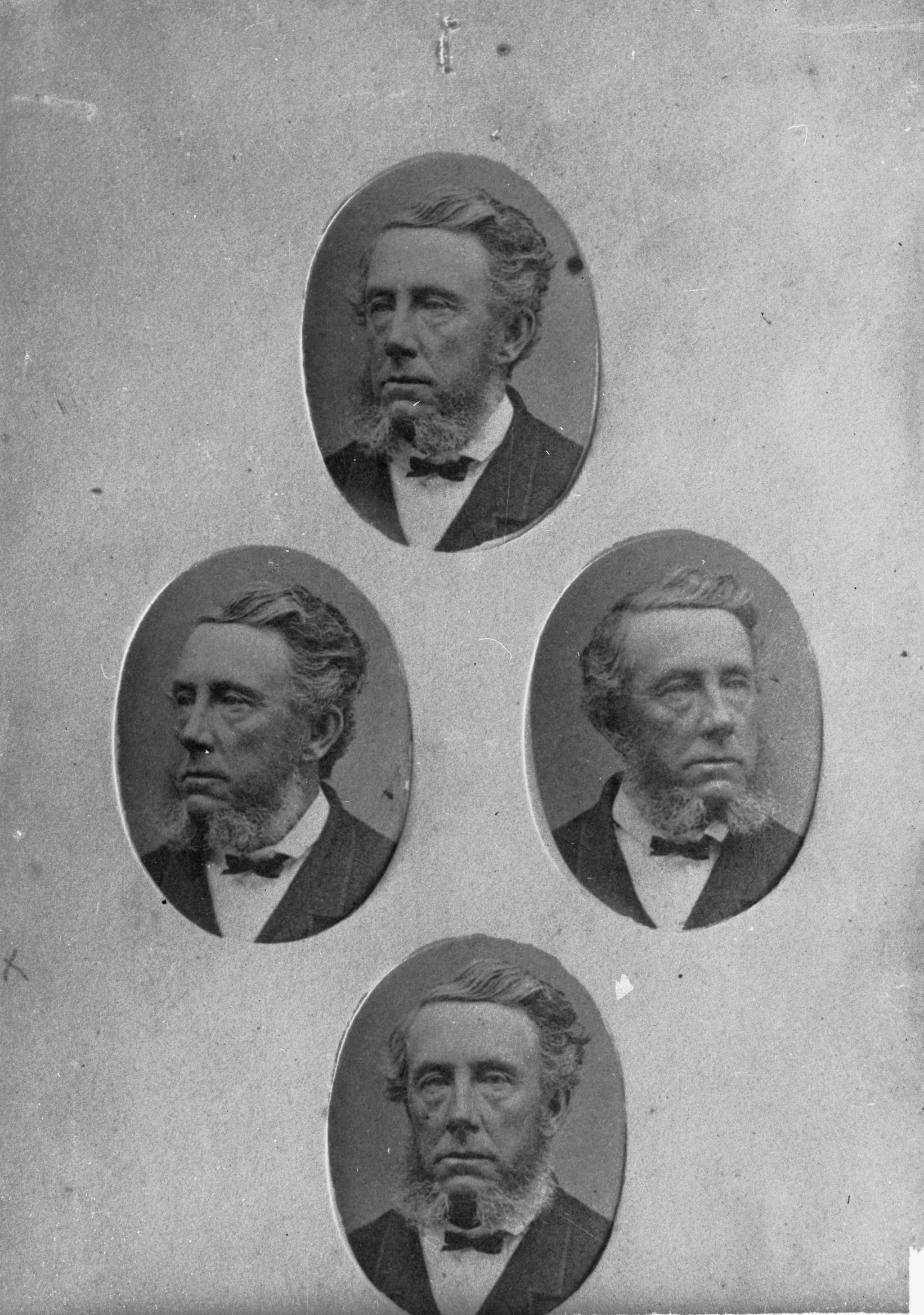
H. B. Hughes

Herbert Bristow Hughes (c. 1821 – 19 May 1892), generally referred to as "H. B. Hughes", was a pioneer pastoralist in the colony of South Australia.

== History ==
Hughes was born in England, a younger brother of Timothy Bristow Hughes, a leading cotton trader in Liverpool for over fifty years, and John Bristow Hughes, who emigrated to Australia from India, and arrived in South Australia from Hobart aboard Porter in February 1841. J. B. Hughes took up land at Emu Flat, around 5 kilometres (3.1 mi) south-west of Clare. Another brother, named Bristow Herbert Hughes joined J. B. Hughes some time before January 1842. Envisaging a bright future in the new colony, they called for H. B. Hughes, who arrived in Adelaide aboard Davidsons in May 1843.

The Hughes brothers selected 3,000 square miles (7,800 km^{2}) of land, stretching from Crystal Brook in the south-west to Yacka in the south-east, up to Mount Lock and Mannanarie in the north-east across nearly to Mount Remarkable and down the eastern side of the Flinders Ranges back to Crystal Brook. They divided the country into three lots, J. B. Hughes taking the south-eastern portion, which he named "Bundaleer", and later sold in 1854 to Charles Brown Fisher; the middle section shared by H. B. Hughes and Bristow Herbert Hughes and named "Booyoolee" (often mis-spelled Booyoolie); the northern end taken by the White brothers, a family with which they had a long relationship and whose sister Hughes was to marry. The White brothers had abandoned the Port Lincoln area after several years of fear and disappointment. They later sold their lease to George Tinline.

At Booyoolee station, which included some of the best land on the Rocky River, near Mount Remarkable and Gladstone, H. B. Hughes with his brother, who later retired, bred cattle, sheep and horses. He went further north, and founded Nockatunga Station on the Wilson River, a tributary of Cooper Creek in Queensland, near the SA/NSW border, from where he drove mobs of cattle to his lucerne paddocks in Netley to fatten up for the Adelaide market. Many of the properties he owned freehold, which proved an advantage when various governments began resuming the larger leasehold properties for closer development. He also owned the Kinchega run on the Darling River in New South Wales. As his sons grew up they took over management of his various properties. The eldest, Herbert White Hughes, took over Booyoolee Estate, where he had a fine residence. Arthur and Harold managed Kinchega cattle station, which they later diverted to running sheep. He was one of the first pastoralists to employ paddocking, using wire fences.

Hughes was a pioneer of the meat-preserving industry in South Australia. He established extensive meat canning factories at Booyoolee and on the Port River, using machinery he imported from England. He was also a pioneer of Murray-Darling river transport. The paddle-steamer Decoy and her barges Reliance and Croupier were built for him in Glasgow and brought out in sections, and were used for the carriage of stock and wool from his up-river properties to Morgan.

He was appointed justice of the peace and Special Magistrate in 1856, but had no time for politics and public affairs. He was perhaps best known as a breeder of horses. Among the thoroughbreds he imported from England were Croupier and Leonidas, which became the sires of several champion racehorses. Another noted horse in his stable was Sir Edmund, which he purchased from William Blackler, and whose progeny, such as Simpleton, Hughes gave names starting with "S". He was a prominent member of the South Australian Jockey Club.

In 1864 Hughes purchased for his wife the grand residence "Athelney" on 9 acres (3.6 ha) in Hackney. "Athelney" was built in 1858 by P. D. Prankerd, a man closely associated with St. Peter's College. It was the setting for much liberal hospitality. When Prince Alfred, the Duke of Edinburgh, on his Australia tour visited St. Peter's College in October 1867, he had lunch with Mr. and Mrs. Hughes at "Athelney". It was later the residence of Edgar Bristow Hughes, and remained in the family for many years.

He died after a short illness, and was buried at the North Road Cemetery on Saturday, 21 May. The list of those attending the ceremony reads like a "Who's Who" of the colony.

== Family ==
Hughes married Laura White (c. 1829 – 5 January 1909) in England in 1854, and named the town of Laura for her. Their family included:

- Herbert White Hughes (6 May 1855 – 26 October 1916) married Rita Crawford ( – ) on 24 October 1889
- Arthur Nicholas Hughes (4 November 1856 – 1919) married Lizzie Stevenson in 1913
- Laura Sophia Hughes (7 March 1859 – 4 June 1941) never married, lived with her sister in "Sea-Bank", Southport, Queensland.
- Harold White Hughes (1861 – 1954) married Ethel Margaret Gwynne in 1916, lived at Fullarton.
- Alfred Hughes (13 February 1864 – )
- Edgar Bristow Hughes (14 July 1866 – 1951) married Ita Marian Augusta Gwynne in 1914, lived at "Athelney", which he purchased in 1917.
- Maria Ethel Hughes (24 January 1868 – ) married cousin John Maddock Hughes in 1907, lived in Southport, Queensland.
- Oswald Hughes (8 November 1870 – )

Rolles Biddle ( – 29 March 1842), the Quaker who was murdered by Aborigines around the same time and in the same district as the presumed murder of C. C. Dutton, was a cousin.

Assertions that H. B. Hughes was related to Sir Walter Watson Hughes (1803–1887), pastoralist and founder of the University of Adelaide, are hard to verify, and may be disregarded.

=== White family ===
Laura, a daughter of Samuel White-White, had five brothers who arrived in South Australia in December 1839 aboard William Barrass: Samuel White, farmer and flour miller, who married Eliza O'Halloran, daughter of T. S. O'Halloran in 1853; Frederick White; Edwin White; William White; and Alfred White, who died shortly after arrival in South Australia. White's River and White's Flat, near Port Lincoln were named for them. Edwin (who was called Thomas on the William Barrass passenger list) and William may have returned early to England; Samuel and Frederick are remembered as the pioneering White brothers of Wirrabara.

Laura's elder sister Elizabeth Hagen White ( – 28 October 1881) in 1861 married William Herbert Squires ( – 30 November 1911), a senior SA public servant.
