= Thomas Wigley =

Thomas Wigley may refer to:

- Thomas Wigley (runholder) (1825–1895), member of the New Zealand Legislative Council
- Thomas Francis Wigley (1854–1933), lawyer and horse racing official in South Australia
- Tom Wigley (born 1940), Australian climate scientist
