= William Wigley (cricketer) =

New Zealand cricketer (1870–1937)

Personal information
- Full name: William Cranstoun Henry Wigley
- Born: 28 November 1870; Christchurch, New Zealand
- Died: 4 December 1937 (aged 67); Sumner, Christchurch, New Zealand
- Batting: Right-handed
- Relatives: Thomas Wigley (father)

Domestic team information
- Years: Team
- 1893/94–1903/04: Canterbury

Career statistics
Competition	First-class
Matches	22
Runs scored	646
Batting average	17.00
100s/50s	0/2
Top score	73
Balls bowled	77
Wickets	2
Bowling average	16.50
5 wickets in innings	0
10 wickets in match	0
Best bowling	1/4
Catches/stumpings	14/–
- Source: Cricinfo, 5 March 2024

William Cranstoun Henry Wigley (28 November 1870 – 4 December 1937) was a New Zealand cricketer. He played in 22 first-class matches for Canterbury from 1893 to 1904.

Wigley was the son of the Hon. Thomas Wigley, a runholder in South Canterbury and a member of the New Zealand Legislative Council. From 1881 to 1889, Wigley attended Christ's College, Christchurch, where he captained the cricket and rugby union teams and set a school record for the shot put. He graduated from the University of New Zealand in 1897 with a Bachelor of Laws degree.

Wigley was a right-handed batsman. He was Canterbury's highest scorer when they toured the North Island in December 1897 and January 1898 playing four first-class matches, although he was unavailable for the final match against Wellington, which Canterbury lost. He scored 198 runs at an average of 39.60 in his three matches, all of which Canterbury won. His best first-class match was on that tour against Auckland, when he scored 37 and 73; in the second innings he added 104 for the ninth wicket with Charles Clark after Canterbury had been 115 for 8.

Wigley worked in Christchurch as a solicitor. He married in Christchurch in 1898. He and his wife had four children before she divorced him in 1924. He remarried, and died in the Christchurch seaside suburb of Sumner in December 1937.
