= Thomas Smeaton =

Thomas Smeaton may refer to:

- Thomas Smeton (1536–1583), or Smeaton, Scottish minister and principal of Glasgow University
- Thomas Drury Smeaton (1831–1908), banker and amateur scientist in the British colony of South Australia
- Thomas Hyland Smeaton (1857–1927), Australian politician and trade unionist
