= D. C. F. Moodie =

South African writer, historian and linguist

Duncan Campbell Francis Moodie (24 January 1838 – 11 February 1891), commonly referred to as D. C. F. Moodie, was a Colony of Natal writer, historian and linguist who published a newspaper The Portonian in Port Adelaide, South Australia, from 1871 to 1879.

== Early life ==
Moodie was born near Stellenbosch, Cape Colony, the sixth son of public servant Donald Moodie, R.N. (1794–1861) and his wife Eliza Sophia Moodie, née Pigot (1804 – 26 October 1881). When quite young, his father was appointed the Colony of Natal's first Colonial Secretary after the imposition of British rule, and the family moved accordingly.

The boy's formal education was sporadic, partly owing to the paucity of teaching in the new Colony, but also on account of his impulsive nature. Most of his education must have come from his mother, whom he adored: a cultured and talented woman who, among other attributes was a fine chess player, and taught her children to play at a high standard. His nomadic nature took him over much of the Colony, where he fraternised with vagrants of many races, gaining a working knowledge of a variety of languages and dialects. He was a particular admirer of the Zulu race, and his vernacular Zulu was said to be indistinguishable from that of a native speaker. He was a fine athlete, and a decent shot with a rifle, and enjoyed quoit playing, wrestling and other sports.

== South Australia ==
Moodie came to South Australia from South Africa around 1869, and soon found employment with the Customs Department at Port Adelaide. In 1870 he was nominated for the Humane Society's medal when he dived into the river fully clothed to rescue a young man who had fallen overboard from the Coonatto. The story that he was subsequently sacked because his tally-book was spoiled by the immersion gained credence with repetition.

Moodie was an excellent swimmer, and on one occasion in 1880 outlasted the renowned "Professor" Frederick Cavill (1839–1927) in a swim from the Semaphore to Glenelg, a distance of 9 or 10 miles (14 or 16 km). Cavill was accompanied by a friend in a rowboat, and Moodie by his Zulu friend Ugende in a catamaran. Moodie, older, "blue-blooded and scarlet-faced" and somewhat corpulent, kept up with his rival and continued for several miles after Cavill was forced to retire due to eye inflammation, but did not complete the distance. Cavill did complete the distance (in the other direction) a week later. Persistent rumours that Moodie had cheated by touching the bottom and so dishonestly propelling himself were rebuffed by referees who had accompanied the pair in another boat.

== The Portonion newspaper ==
Moodie founded the weekly newspaper The Portonian (1871 – May 1879) as a forum for news about Port Adelaide, but much of the paper's content was devoted to criticising the Parliament, the Governor and just about any other authority figure. His racy, vigorous style of writing won for the paper a large and loyal circulation. He employed a talented cartoonist in "Cerberus" (John Eden Savill, better known as a racehorse owner), and journalist Spencer Skipper, who later, as "Hugh Kalyptus", gained fame for his satirical column "Echoes and Re-Echoes". Moodie contributed news items from South Africa, in particular the Anglo-Zulu War early in 1879. The Portonian was printed by Webb, Vardon & Pritchard, and the artwork lithographed by the firm of Penman & Galbraith.

In its last few years, The Portonian became intermittent and ceased entirely in May 1879 without announcement or apology. Savill's political cartoons had almost completely disappeared and in their place were works by W. Wyburd and W. Pyndar Willis.

Other satiric newspapers of the period in Adelaide were:
- F. S. Carroll's The Lantern;
- H. C. Evans's Quiz (became Quiz and The Lantern)
- J. C. F. Johnson's Adelaide Punch
- H. A. Grainger's Australian Star

== Personal life ==
Moodie, who was known to carry a horsetail to use a fly-swatter, was described as genial and sociable but erratic. "Zulu" Moodie as he had been dubbed seemed to be continually in the public eye.

Moody, depicted standing, whip in one hand, placing a white paper hat labelled "Portonian" on the head of a kneeling and praying figure, clutching a copy of the Methodist Journal under his arm. From a political cartoon by Alfred Clint, 1874.

He took offence at an article in the Williamstown Advertiser of Williamstown, Victoria on 15 May 1880 in which Queen Victoria was called an "obese, not overburdened with brains, old woman". He and Ugende took a steamer to Melbourne with the avowed intent of giving Alfred Thomas Clark, the paper's prominent co-owner, a caning. He was convicted of assault and fined £3. Not having sufficient funds for the return passage, the pair walked back to Adelaide, taking 17 days, crossing the Ninety Mile Desert in five. The cane was sent by some sympathisers to Walsh Bros., where it was suitably mounted, and engraved:

With this cane Mr. D.C. F. Moodie thrashed A. T. Clark, M.P., for insulting Her Majesty Queen Victoria. Presented by a few Melbourne gentlemen, June, 1880.

On his return to Adelaide he found that solicitor Alfred Knight Whitby had given advice to Mrs. Moodie regarding separation from her husband. Moodie promptly sought out the lawyer at Aldridge's Prince Alfred Hotel and in front of witnesses knocked him to the floor. For this assault he was fined £5.

He wrote lyrics, to which Jules Meilhan BA ( –1882) composed the music, for a patriotic cantata which was performed at the opening of the Adelaide Exhibition of 1881 (not to be confused with the Jubilee Cantata, or Victoria Cantata, written (words and music) by Carl Puttmann for the Adelaide Jubilee International Exhibition of 1887).

At one time, he put himself forward as candidate for the seat of Encounter Bay, but was hissed down; he offered to lead a contingent to fight in the Transvaal, then to organise a South Australian Guerrilla Force; he wrote "Letters to the Editor" on subjects as diverse as decoding the Biblical 666 and the ban on ostrich farming. He was in the forefront in organising a Literary Society, then after being elected Secretary, claimed to have lost the minute book and resigned.

== Return to British Africa ==
In 1883 he made a brief return to the Colony of Natal, then around September 1883 returned for good. Around 1889 or 1890 he founded a newspaper The South African Rambler, which may not have survived its first issue.

He died at sea aboard a steamer off the island of Tenerife, perhaps en route between Cape Town and London.

== Bibliography ==
- Moodie, Duncan Campbell Francis; Saville, J. Eden (1871), Collection of political cartoons from The Portonian
- "Austral" (D. C. F. Moodie) (1873), Poems, [s.n.] included a poem by his brother John Bell Moodie.
- Moodie, Duncan Campbell Francis (1879), The history of the battles and adventures of the British, the Boers and the Zulus, in Southern Africa from 1495 to 1879 : including every particular of the Zulu War of 1879, with a chronology. Also a short sketch of South Australia. 1879 by the same author, George Robertson
- Moodie, Duncan Campbell Francis (March 1882), "Battles in South Africa including the Zulu War", Frearson's Monthly Illustrated Adelaide News, George Robertson (published 1882)
- "Austral" (D. C. F. Moodie) (1882), Lays from an Australian lyre, City of London Publishing Company
- Moodie, Duncan Campbell Francis (1883), Southern songs (2nd ed.), Adams & Co
- Moodie, Duncan Campbell Francis (1888), The history of the battles and adventures of the British, Boers and Zulus in Southern Africa, from the time of Pharaoh Necho, to 1880, Murray & St. Leger
- Dunn, John; Moodie, Duncan Campbell Francis, (editor.) (31 May 2014), John Dunn, Cetywayo, and the three Generals, Barnsley, South Yorkshire Pen & Sword History (published 2014), ISBN 978-1-78346-324-4

. . . His most notable performance, "The Wars and Battlefields of South Africa", will be of abiding value and interest. It is a pictorial history of the picturesque epochs of South Africa. It contains a good deal of matter, Chief Dunn's chapters for instance, that can be found nowhere else.

== Family ==
Moodie came from a large and influential family, descendants of Major James Moodie (1757–1820), Laird Of Melsetter. His father's younger brother John Wedderburn Dunbar Moodie (1797–1869) was a notable administrator and author whose wife Susannah Moodie, née Strickland (1803–1885) was a noted author. Thomas Moodie was a cousin.

Among his many brothers were:

- (William James) Dunbar Moodie (1827–1903), Resident Magistrate of the Umkomanzi District.
- Donald Moodie (1827– ) excelled at the long jump, and was a fine swimmer
- George Pigot Moodie (1829–1891), a surveyor
- Benjamin Charles Moodie (1833–1858), was a champion runner
- John Bell Moodie (1836–1876), a poet of some merit who became a barrister, was a fine swimmer.
- Alfred Harding West Moodie (1846–1882) was Postmaster-General of Natal

A sister married Rev. James Green, Dean of Pietermaritzburg, and another was the wife of diplomat John Shepstone, brother of Sir Theophilus Shepstone, Secretary for Native Affairs.

Moodie married Matilda Hunt (1855– ) in Adelaide on 27 June 1874. Among their children were

- Harold/Harald Wedderburn Moodie (21 September 1874 – December 1898) born in Adelaide
- Erland Olave Moodie (5 May 1884 – ) born in Pietermaritzburg

For all the attention Moodie received in Adelaide, his family remained out of the limelight, and little information on their activities is available from the contemporary press. They had a home on South Terrace.
