= Frederick W. Allen =

Australian racehorse owner and breeder

Frederick William Allen (c. 1844 – 15 October 1927) was a prominent racehorse owner and breeder and notable resident of Edithburgh in the colony of South Australia.

== History ==
Frederick William Allen, senior (2 September 1813 – 14 February 1850), left England for South Australia aboard HMS Buffalo, Governor Hindmarsh's flagship in the First Fleet of South Australia, in 1836. He kept the Southern Cross Hotel, Currie Street, later Temple (or Shakespeare) Tavern in Gilles Place. He married Catherine Oxenham (c. 1817 – 29 November 1880) on 23 April 1839. Catherine and her daughter Eliza were fellow-passengers aboard Buffalo. They had a son John born 7 December 1839 and a daughter Julia on 19 May 1842. Frederick William Allen was born 3 June 1844. They had another son Albert on 3 August 1846. The widow Catherine Allen married Henry Blake ( – ) on 27 February 1853.

Frederick William Allen can be presumed to be the only one who survived early childhood. He was educated at Francis Haire's school in Angas Street, Adelaide, and after leaving school in 1861 joined the Police Force, and in 1863 was stationed at Mount Gambier. He was sent to Edithburgh in 1864 as Clerk of the Courts, Harbourmaster, Sub-Collector of Customs, and Returning Officer for the district, and in 1886 was added the duties of Post and Telegraph master, which offices he filled for many years.

During his residence in Edithburgh, Allen founded a horse stud, "Hopeville", 4.5 miles (7.2 km) from town, starting in a small way with the proven mare Lady Doris and her daughter Lady Dudley. Considering the size of his stud, the number of winners he produced may have been an Australian record. Allen owned and bred Bombastes, winner of the 1906 Great Eastern Steeplechase, A.R.C. Grand National Steeplechase, and other important races. His Dirk Hammerhand won the S.A.J.C. St. Leger. Tattersalls Cup, and numerous other events. Royal Artillery won the South Australian Stakes, Onkaparinga Cup, and the S.A.J.C. St. Leger, in which race he beat Clean Sweep, winner of the 1900 Melbourne Cup. Other notable "Hopeville" horses were Troubridge; Lord Setay, famously trained by William Sheppard; and Lady Nallan.

One of the oldest turf identities in South Australia, Allen died suddenly of heart failure in company of other racing men at the Adelaide Tattersalls Club.

== Other interests ==
He was for many years President of the Edithburgh Institute.

Allen was a Freemason, and member of the Order of Odd Fellows.

== Family ==
Frederick W. Allen married Janet Pentland ( – 1927) on 15 December 1868. Janet was a daughter of Robert Pentland of Melbourne.

- Frederick William Allen, jun. (1869 – 24 October 1948) married Bertha Wright in 1915. He served in the South African War, then joined the Railways Department.
- Victoria Anne Mary Allen (1871–1956)
- Florence Mildred Allen (1875– ) married Francis Thomas Mee, Master Mariner, ( – ) on 20 July 1915
- Pentland Allen (1879 – 17 April 1918) also a well-known sportsman, trained as a veterinary surgeon, managed the stud farm and racing stables for his father for several years. He enlisted with the First AIF in 1915, died of ICTs of the neck while on active service in France.
- Lillian May Allen (1881 – 1971) married Alfred John Adams, of Gawler ( – 1941) on 5 July 1900. He was a master at St. Peter's College, later at Roseworthy College, and was one of those embroiled in the circumstances which led to the resignation of its Principal, Walter Richard Birks.
