= Will Simpson =

Will Simpson may refer to:

- Will Simpson (Ackley Bridge), fictional character
- Will Simpson (comics), Northern Irish comic book illustrator
- Will Simpson (equestrian) (born 1959), American Olympic show jumper
- Will Simpson, a version of the character Nuke (Marvel Comics), in the TV series Jessica Jones
- Will Simpson, 35th mayor of Ashland, Kentucky

== See also ==
- William Simpson (disambiguation)
- Bill Simpson (disambiguation)
