= Gabriel Bennett =

Australian horse breeder and cattle seller

Gabriel Bennett (23 December 1817 – 13 September 1895) was an auctioneer, stock and cattle salesman and horse breeder in South Australia. He founded the stock and station agents Bennett and Fisher.

== History ==
Bennett was born in London, a son of Solomon Bennett (c. 1795 – 11 January 1864) of 5 Slaverton Row, Walworth Road, London. and married in 1846.

In 1853 he emigrated to Melbourne, and the following year arrived in Adelaide and opened a butcher's shop in Currie Street then in 1857 moved to Hindley Street, then in 1863 moved into the wholesale meat trade. John Lazar was an employee. In 1865, he joined E. M. Bagot, a fellow-member of the South Australian Jockey Club committee, as partners in Bennett & Bagot, station and livestock agents, with offices in Clarke's buildings, Hindley Street, and afterwards in Gresham Street. That partnership was dissolved in October 1876, Bagot having to declare himself insolvent, and Bennett carried on business with his son Henry Bennett. This partnership, despite the business being quite profitable, ended in insolvency, due largely to embezzlement on the part of his sons Henry and (to a lesser extent) Simeon, who was employed as a clerk. Bennett continued in the same line of business alone, trading as "G. Bennett' & Co.", and made significant reparations to creditors; the sons departed for Queensland, where South Australian law did not apply.

In 1889 Bennett was joined by Benjamin Fisher, founding the firm of Bennett and Fisher which prospered from the outset, and became one of Australia's foremost stock and station agents.

== Horse racing ==
Bennett was at the forefront of thoroughbred racing in South Australia. At a private meeting held on 2 June 1861, a steering committee was formed consisting of Sir J. H. Fisher, W. H. Formby, W. Filgate, C. B. Fisher, and James Chambers, determined to re-form the old South Australian Jockey Club and draw up rules. At a second meeting held on 1 July 1861, a committee consisting of E. M. Bagot (chairman), W. K. Simms, P. B. Coglin (starter), and Gabriel Bennett was elected to establish facilities and organise the first racing program. They settled on the Thebarton track as their racecourse, and the first programme was held 1–3 January 1862. Bennett had his "Butcher Boy" and "Miss Rowe" in several races, but without success. At the summer meeting 1863, with "Lord of the Isles", ridden by Billy Simpson, he was more fortunate. He succeeded P. B. Coglin as official starter in 1863, holding that position until the Club folded in 1869.

Horses for which he was, later, better known were Emulation, Impudence, Loquacity, Ada, Vibration, and Presumption, and was involved with William Gerrard of Yoho estate, near Delamere, in the breeding of thoroughbreds. 1876 was a good year for him; his horses taking the St Leger at Morphettville, the Geelong Gold Cup, and the Geelong Handicap with Emulation. In the same year he won the Adelaide Cup and the Queen's Guineas with Impudence. He was, for a man in his position, a very moderate gambler; seldom laying more than £10 in the course of a meeting. He never attended a Melbourne Cup or an Easter meeting of the Oakbank Racing Club.

Bennett was also involved in the formation of the Adelaide Racing Club, which had its origin in races held at the "Old Adelaide Racecourse" (now Victoria Park) on New Year's Day 1870 and 1878, and was formalised in 1879. He was one of the four who that year, on behalf of the Club, took out a 21-year lease on "The Old Racecourse", the others being William Blackler, Seth Ferry and Dr Robert Peel; soon whittled down to just two: Blackler and Ferry. Bennett served as steward and starter, as which he also officiated at some country clubs, though he was barred 1881–1883 while serving out his time as an undischarged bankrupt.

He also often acted as a Judge at Agricultural Society Shows and other events.

== Other interests ==
Bennett was a commissioned officer in the Reedbeds Cavalry in the South Australian Volunteer Force.

Bennett was a respected member of the Jewish community, and held several offices with the Adelaide Synagogue. He was president of the congregation when the new Rabbi, Rev. A. T. Boas arrived in South Australia on 13 February 1870, and in the following July laid the foundation stone of the new synagogue.

Gabriel Bennett was not connected with the firm of Bennett & Barton (Stephen Bennett and Charles H. Barton), land, loan and commission agents of Kapunda and Adelaide.

== Family ==
Gabriel Bennett (23 December 1817 – 6 September 1895) married Rosetta "Rose" Aaron (c. 1818 – 16 July 1893) in England on 8 July 1846. They had a home in Gover Street, North Adelaide. Their children were

- Henry Bennett (c. 1848 – ) married Rebecca Friedman (28 March 1850 – 30 July 1923) in Melbourne on 29 November 1876. Their only son drowned crossing Ferrers Creek, Queensland on 7 March 1913.
- (Rebecca) Kate Bennett (c. 1850 – 9 October 1886) married Jacob M. Asher (c. 1849 – 3 January 1922) of Port Augusta on 15 August 1882. He was later cordial manufacturer of Kalgoorlie, then Fremantle, Western Australia.
- Elisabeth Bennett (c. 1852 – 24 July 1904)
- Fanny Bennett (1857 – 7 June 1927) married widower Moss Judah Solomon (1843–1933), son of Judah Moss Solomon, in 1895. She was in 1902 founder of the Jewish Ladies Guild.
- Simeon Bennett (1858 – ), also known as A. S. Bennett, married Reyna Lawrence (1854 – 30 December 1927) on 26 November 1879. Among their children was G. S. Bennett, later a professor at "Bethaney College, USA" (most likely Bethany College)
- Miriam "Minnie" Bennett (1859 – 28 November 1935) married John Daniels (1860 – 20 November 1926) on 26 July 1888. They had a home "Elsmore" on 74 Buxton Street, North Adelaide. He was a son of John Daniels (c. 1817 – 17 October 1887) and Rosetta Solomon (1829 – 23 April 1881), who married in 1854, and was prominent in the voluntary militia.

He was not related to Dr. Alfred Henry Bennett (c. 1867–1930), the noted racehorse owner, member of the Adelaide and Tattersalls Clubs, and from 1913 the Adelaide Racing Club committee.

The funeral took place at the Jewish section of the West Terrace Cemetery.
