= William Sheppard (horse trainer) =

Australian horse trainer (1855–1932)

William Sheppard (1855 – 24 January 1932) was a veteran racehorse trainer in the Colony and State of South Australia.

== History ==
Sheppard was born in Essex in straitened circumstances, a son of a gamekeeper. At age nine he was apprenticed to a Mr. Hilton, who raced dogs and horses, but some four years later he left that situation and joined up with the horse training establishment of Tom Sherwood (1838–1923) at Red House, Epsom, and trained the Derby winner Cremorne. After a couple of years, and a brief return to his home, he started with Mayhoe or Heywood, trainer for Baron Rothschild at his stud in Newmarket, then Tom Jennings, also at Newmarket. He was next with trainer Bloss or Captain Mitchell, who had as a client Sir George Chetwynd, perhaps the 3rd Baronet Chetwynd. In 1874 Sir George sold two stallions, Countryman and Winterlake, Sir Edmund, a yearling colt, and the mare Bridal Wreath to a visiting South Australian breeder William Blackler, who hired Sheppard as a groom to accompany the horses on their voyage to Australia.

He worked for Blackler at what was to become the Fulham Park Stud at The Reedbeds for three years, then returned to England. Whether this was intended as a holiday or some other purpose, Sheppard was soon back in Adelaide with Blackler. He next began working as a private trainer for Charles L. Taylor, who also had stables at The Reedbeds, and his first major success: Lightfoot, winner of the 1879 Great Eastern Steeplechase, and a string of other hurdle races with that horse and Jack's the Lad.

His next employer was Harry Leary with stables at the Seven Stars Hotel, Angas Street, and General Havelock Hotel, Hutt Street, then set up on his own as a public trainer at the Britannia Hotel. A year or two later he was engaged as private trainer by Thomas or W. Cowan, and stayed at the Parkside Hotel. Next came Seth Ferry, who had stables at Mitcham and Gawler, and for whom he prepared some 50 winners, notably Sir Ewan, winner of three consecutive Hunt Club Cups.

He was next appointed head trainer for Gerald Buckley (c. 1855–1935), of "Narrapumelap Estate", near Wickliffe, Victoria, but the situation was not to his liking, and nine months later he was back in Adelaide. He was for a while private trainer for Thomas "Tom" Jordan of Jordan Park, Edwardstown. He then set himself up as a public trainer, working from the Britannia Hotel, Norwood for around 10 years. Around 1904 the family moved into a nearby property at Stacy (now Stacey) Street, Norwood, which he dubbed "Corizann Lodge", named for a 1 or 2-year old bay mare he got in exchange for a pony that cost him £3, and went on to win for him hundreds of pounds. Notable clients around this time were John Rowan (1841–1920) of Warrnambool and Mount Gambier and Frederick W. Allen (1844–1927) of Edithburgh.

The last horse he trained was the hurdler Insult, holder of two State records, and throughout his 60-year career he trained the winners of some 500 or 600 races.

Sheppard died of pneumonia after a year or two's ill health, after a career in racing perhaps unmatched for length of service and integrity: throughout his long career he had only once been called before the stewards, and on that occasion found blameless. He was survived by two sons; his widow, who had been an invalid for some years, died six months later.

Their son "Les" Sheppard continued training at the family property at Stacey Street, Norwood, which included stables, loose boxes, and hayloft. Les was noted as a "clocker", closely watching and recording the performance of his charges, and wrote for The News under the byline "Lord Setay", in homage to the horse of that name, perhaps the finest his father trained.

== Family ==
William Sheppard married Annie Hughes in 1883, perhaps same person as Hannah (c. 1862 – 7 June 1932). They had a home "Corizann Lodge" at 4 Stacey Street, Norwood. He had two sons:

- Arthur William Charles "Bill" Sheppard (1884 – 17 April 1950) had a serious accident in 1896 while riding on the Old Course training track, which necessitated amputation of the left leg. He later worked at Simpson's factory, Dudley Park

- Leslie "Sam" Sheppard ( –1983) was a jockey
- Nellie Sheppard

- Leslie James "Les" "Shep" Sheppard ( –1987) was also a horse trainer, quiz champion, and as "Lord Setay" wrote on turf topics for The News.

== Recognition ==
Sheppards Lane, Norwood, which ran alongside his property, was named for him.
