= Bennett & Fisher =

South Australian business

Bennett & Fisher, Limited was a South Australian business, for many years one of Australia's major live stock salesmen, wool and produce brokers, and land and insurance agents.

== History ==
Stock and cattle salesman and auctioneer Gabriel Bennett and accountant Benjamin Fisher went into partnership in July 1889, in Bennett's office in Currie Street, Adelaide. Fisher retired from active involvement with the business c. 1910. Soon they had outgrown their offices and moved to Bowman Buildings, King William Street.

By 1919 Bennett & Fisher had the lion's share of cattle, lamb and calf sales at the Metropolitan Abattoirs Market. Bennett & Fisher Limited was founded early that year to take over the assets of Bennett & Fisher and Cheadle, Crase & Co., wool and hide brokers. Hugh Davis was appointed managing director; significant board members around this time were Alfred S. Cheadle and T. S. Cheadle, A. G. Rymill (chairman of directors), K. D. Bowman and A. A. Scarfe. Branches were opened in Broken Hill, Burra, Peterborough, Quorn and Strathalbyn. New wheat and wool stores were erected at Port Adelaide. In 1920 the company took over Alfred C. Catt & Son, and moved their headquarters from King William Street to 54 Currie Street on the corner of Currie and Leigh Streets. In 1960 Bennett and Fisher commissioned a new Georgian style building to be built one block away on the corner of Currie Street and Gilbert Place. The building's front door was flanked by columns each side and arched ground floor windows. They moved into this building in 1961.

Bennett & Fisher purchased Anchor Foods and Ditters' fruit and nut business and in 1988 the R. M. Williams clothing and footwear company for $14 million. They sold the highly profitable Anchor Foods to CSR Limited in 1987.

In 1992 the company sacked managing director Tony Summers, and spent $214,000 investigating his affairs. Among the losses sustained during his directorship was some $4 million in overvaluation of a property purchased by the company from Summers' wife. After large and increasing losses each year from 1990 to 1993 the company was placed in receivership by a consortium of creditor banks. Bennett & Fisher Limited was purchased by a company headed by Kerry Stokes and Ken Cowley, and restructured as R. M. Williams Holdings Ltd. in 1995.

== See also ==
- Dalgety & Co.
- Elder, Smith & Co.
- Goldsbrough Mort & Co.
