= William Simpson =

Billy, Bill, Will, Willie and William Simpson may refer to:

== Artists ==
- William Simpson (portrait artist) (c. 1818–1872), African American painter and civil right activist
- William Simpson (Scottish artist) (1823–1899), Scottish war artist and correspondent
- William Marks Simpson (1903–1958), American sculptor and teacher
- Will Simpson (comics) (born 1960), Northern Irish comics, film and television storyboard and concept artist

== Politicians ==
- William Dunlap Simpson (1823–1890), American governor of South Carolina from 1879
- William John Simpson (1851–1901), Canadian journalist and political figure in Quebec
- William T. Simpson (1886–1980), American legislator in New York state
- William C. Simpson, American Republican mayor of Ashland, Kentucky in 1936 and 1948

== Scholars ==
- William Simpson (teacher) (before 1790–after 1828), English headmaster, first (1823–1828) to lead Bootham School
- William John Ritchie Simpson (1855–1931), Scottish physician and specialist in tropical medicine
- W. Douglas Simpson (1896–1968), Scottish architecture and archaeology lecturer
- William Kelly Simpson (1928–2017), American professor of Egyptology and archeology
- William James Simpson (born 1954), Australian-British-American medievalist, a/k/a James Simpson
- William R. Simpson (born 1966), American researcher in Alaska of snow chemistry
- William M. R. Simpson (born 1981), British philosopher, winner of Cardinal Mercier Prize

== Sportsmen ==
- Billy Simpson (jockey) (c. 1840–1873), South Australian rider and trainer
- Billy Simpson (footballer, born 1878) (1878–1962), English left back and centre half for Sunderland and Lincoln City
- William Simpson (rugby league) (before 1890–after 1911), English wing during 1900s and 1910s
- Billy Simpson (footballer, born 1929) (1929–2017), Northern Ireland centre forward
- Willie Simpson, American fullback in 1961 on List of Pittsburgh Steelers players
- Bill Simpson (racing driver) (1940–2019), American racecar safety pioneer
- Bill Simpson (American football) (born 1951), American defensive back
- Will Simpson (equestrian) (born 1959), American Olympic show jumper
- William Simpson (cricket umpire) (1915–1967), English cricket umpire

== Others ==
- William Hood Simpson (1888–1980), American Ninth Army general in Europe during World War II
- William Gayley Simpson (1892–1991), American white nationalist and author
- William Simpson (Australian judge) (1894–1966), Australian general and administrator
- William Simpson (trade unionist) (1920–2001), Scottish political activist
- Bill Simpson (actor) (1931–1986), Scottish actor
- Billy Simpson (singer) (born 1987), Indonesian singer-songwriter

== Characters ==
- Will Simpson, version of 1986's Nuke (Marvel Comics) in TV series Jessica Jones
- Will Simpson (Ackley Bridge), teacher in 2017 British TV drama
