= William Blackler =

Australian horse breeder (1827–1896)

William Blackler (1827 – 26 June 1896) was a horse breeder and sportsman in the early days of the British colony of South Australia.

== History ==
Blackler was born at Newton Downs, Devonshire, in 1827, a son of Richard Blackler (c. 1791 – 30 January 1876) and Elizabeth Blackler ( –1851) and arrived in South Australia with his parents, sisters Ellen and Amelia and brothers John and Richard aboard Caroline in December 1839. His father started farming at Unley.

Blackler was in March 1851 barman at the Old Spot Hotel in Gawler, and that same year joined the gold rush for Bendigo, where he was fortunate, returning to Adelaide a wealthy man. By June 1853 he was lessee of the Port Hotel, Port Adelaide. His brother John Blackler was not so fortunate, and died on 7 September 1853 age 30 at the Bendigo diggings. Blackler took the Britannia Hotel, Port Adelaide c. 1863, which he relinquished in 1869, and brother Richard took the Port Admiral Hotel in 1860.

As a young man, Blackler developed a love of steeplechase riding, taking great delight in tackling fences and water jumps. In 1868 he purchased an estate of 268 acres (108 ha), of which 202 acres (82 ha) was grassy paddocks suitable for agistment, on Henley Beach Road near The Reedbeds, where he later established a horse stud dubbed Fulham Park Estate (now part of the suburb Lockleys). C. B. Fisher had an adjacent property, "Lockleys", Section 145. In 1869 he imported the first pack of hounds into the Colony, purchased in England by his brother Richard, signalling the formation of the Adelaide Hunt Club. He acted as Master of the Hounds for several years, then in 1871 after a dispute withdrew his support and at the instigation of J. A. Ellery sold the pack to a club in Mount Gambier, donating the proceeds to the Mount Gambier Hospital.

He was a founder in December 1869, with Seth Ferry, Gabriel Bennett and his son Henry Bennett, George Church, and Dr. Peel, of the Adelaide Racing Club, formed to conduct events on the Old Adelaide Racecourse, which they leased from the Adelaide City Council. Blackler, Ferry, Bennett and Peel took out a 21-year lease from the council, and embarked on ambitious improvements, spending far more than was necessary, particularly on the grandstand, to comply with conditions of the lease. At some stage Bennett and Dr. Peel withdrew from the partnership. A totalizator was installed and bookmakers were charged 10 guineas to operate on the grounds. A Melbourne bookmaker, Joe "Leviathan" Thompson, refused to pay this charge, and sued the lessees for being refused admission. Thompson won the case, tried by Mr. Justice Boucaut. The council had the right, by Act of Parliament, to specify in the lease under what conditions persons could be admitted, but had failed to do so, and this was the point that brought Blackler and Ferry undone. The Council promptly issued an amended lease contract.

In April 1874 Blackler left by the steamship Nubia for England, where he purchased the noted stallions Countryman, Winterlake, and Sir Edmund, and the brood mare Bridal Wreath, the foundation of his Fulham Stud. The horses were accompanied by Bill Sheppard, who served as their groom, and was to have a long and respected career as trainer in South Australia. He made another trip in 1876 and brought back a dozen fine brood mares, among them Instep, whose progeny won practically every major race in Australia. Countryman, sire of 1882 Melbourne Cup winner The Assyrian, died in September 1882 while still young, and Winterlake had to be destroyed after a serious accident, two serious blows to his ambitions. Sir Edmund, sire of many champion jumpers, was only a yearling when he was brought out. Blackler sold him as a two-year-old to Gabriel Bennett, who passed him on to Ferry, and later did stud duty for H. B. Hughes at Booyoolee Station, near Gladstone.

With the death of Countryman, Blackler looked around for a replacement and settled on Eli Jellett's Richmond, paying for the stallion 1,000 or 1,200 guineas, and the pick of his first batch of foals. This proved a good purchase, and reinforced Blackler's reputation as a judge of horseflesh, as Richmond's progeny included some 60 winners. In 1889 Blackler purchased Thunderbolt at auction for 230 guineas, which horse proved to be the sire of another batch of champions.

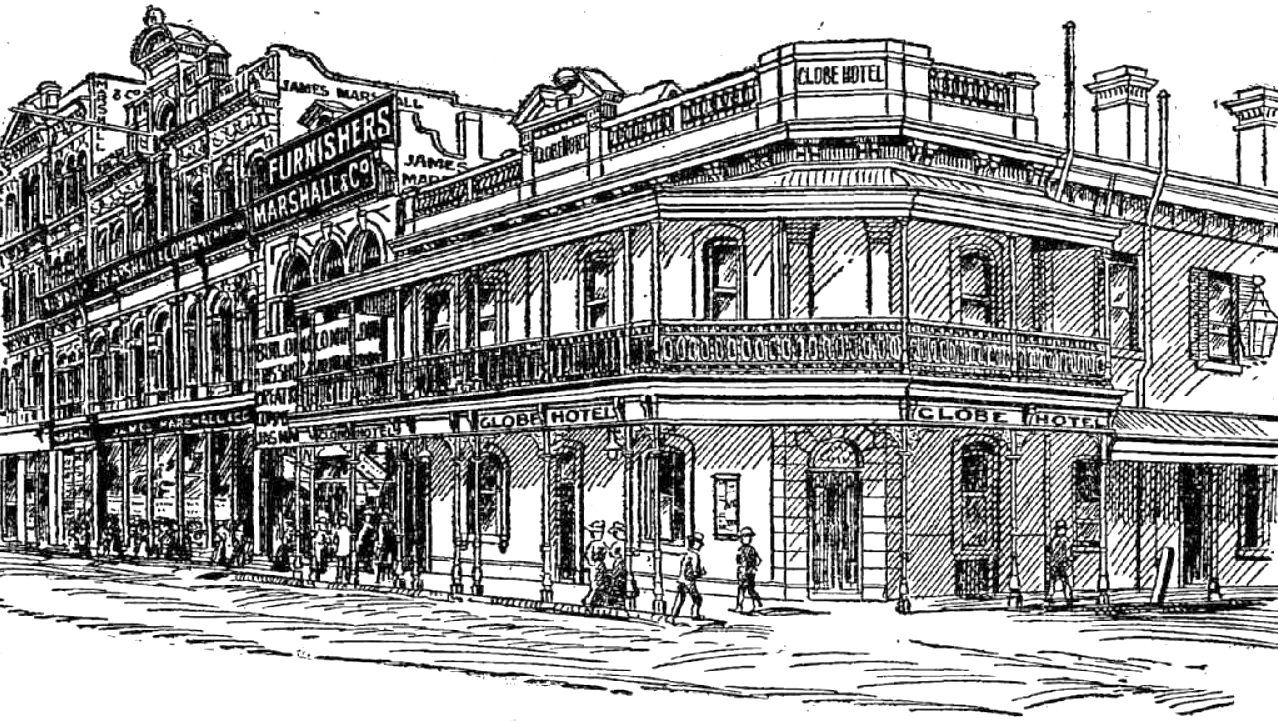
Globe Hotel, Adelaide, demolished 1907

In August 1878 Blackler became licensee of the Globe Hotel, for years a popular meeting-place in Rundle Street for the racing fraternity. A year later, at his instigation, an Adelaide Tattersalls Club was formed, with H. Cohen appointed secretary, and he provided rooms at "The Globe" for their activities, open 7–11pm. In September 1879 he transferred his licence to the hotel to J. H. Aldridge.

His first yearling sale at the Henley Beach Road property, which he dubbed "Fulham Park", was in 1880, and was held annually for many years thereafter. He soon found he could get a better price for his thoroughbreds once they had been raced: before Richmond was raced he could not get £300 for him, but after his appearance on the turf he was sold for 500 guineas. He most notable success was when his Port Admiral won the 1894 Adelaide Cup.

In 1882 he instituted he "Fulham Stud Sires Produce Stakes" for two-year-old progeny of Winterlake and Countryman, and the "Fulham Park Plate" races, for which he subscribed prizes of 100 guineas, under the auspices of the A.R.C.

Blackler acted as Judge on the Old Course for many years, and was on the committee and a Steward of the Adelaide Racing Club. He also acted as Judge for the S. A. Tattersalls Club and for the Onkaparinga Racing Club, and was on the Tattersalls Club Committee for some years, and was re-elected shortly before his death.

Between 1880 and April 1882 three of the lessees dropped out for various reasons, leaving only Blackler and Ferry. Several committeemen dropped out, alarmed at the club's ballooning financial liability, leaving the committee short of the quorum necessary to appoint replacements, and the club had to be re-booted.

In late 1882 Blackler, Ferry and William Gordon purchased "Evanston", the training ground of James Jenkins on the outskirts of Gawler, at a cost of £5,000, with the intention of making it into the Gawler Racecourse, and lost no time in agitating for a Racing Club to be formed along the lines of the A.R.C. They soon had a grandstand built. This venture could be seen as a way of circumventing the limit of three meetings per year at which the totalizator could be used at the Old Course, but stymied by the Totalizator Repeal Act of 1883.

In 1885 a consortium of businessmen led by W. Rounsevell, keen to improve the profitability of the Morphettville course, which included adding extra facilities like a steeplechase course and a plumpton (coursing track), and closing down the "Old Course", offered to purchase the lease from Ferry and Blackler. They could not however countenance Ferry's asking price of £5000. He had, for no obvious reasons apart from grandiosity and the desire to upstage the S.A.J.C., invested twice as much on improvements as the Council conditions had stipulated, notably on the grandstand, which was better appointed than that at Flemington.

Then South Australia entered a period of economic downturn, brought about by the drought of 1884–1886, and the racing industry suffered; the A.R.C. disproportionately so, and Blackler felt the time was ripe to cut their losses, and outlined a plan whereby the council would resume the course and recompense the partners, as they were keen to extend Halifax Street and bisect the "Old Course". Ferry strongly disagreed, and there began the split between the two partners, which became quite bitter, at times to the point of farce. At the Globe Hotel one day, Blackler retaliated to something Ferry said by threatening to punch his face. Ferry turned to a nearby sportsman, and gave him specific instructions as to how White's Rooms should be secured for the prize fight: Blackler stormed off, fuming. What followed was a few years of low-key meetings run by Ferry — sufficient to satisfy the council's requirements, but with modest stake money, consequently races with few starters dominated by Ferry's own stable, and poor attendance.

On 11 October 1888 a meeting of interested sportsmen held at the Globe Hotel resolved to re-form the Club once more. A steering committee consisting of Ebenezer Ward, M.P., J. MacDonald, and Samuel James Whitmore was formed. In November 1888 the Blacklers agreed to take over the lease and the club's debts to Ferry, assessed as £2,500, and brought in a new co-lessee, John Pile. A provisional committee was formed to form a new Club: J. C. Bray, M.P., J. H. Gordon, M L.C.. Messrs. E. Ward, M.P., J. Pile, W. Blackler, J. McDonald, S. J. Whitmore. Gabriel Bennett, and Dr. O'Connell. In December 1888 the Licensed Victuallers' Racing Club (founded June 1888) joined with the rump of the A.R.C. to form a renewed Adelaide Racing Club with an additional 250 members, with the Victuallers' committee augmented by W. Robertson, John Pile, S. R. Wilson, and R. C. Cornish.

In June 1891 he attempted to sell the Fulham Park Stud and other freehold properties, valued at £65,000, on the art union principle. The lottery was however under-subscribed and had to be abandoned. Blackler died shortly after catching a cold, which developed into pneumonia. He was remembered as a man with a very straightforward nature, verging on rudeness, but was esteemed for his honesty. His remains were buried at the West Terrace Cemetery, attended by a great number of mourners and well-wishers from the racing fraternity, in stark contrast to that accorded his almost exact contemporary, Dr. Robert Peel.

== Publications ==
- Catalogue of the Fulham thoroughbred colts & fillies by the imported sires Countryman and Winterlake by order of William Blackler, Esq., third annual sale at Formby & Boase's Bazaar, Currie Street, Adelaide, Friday, May 26, 1882, at two o'clock Ferry, Moore, & Wilkinson, auctioneers, &c. (1882) Held by State Library of South Australia

== Family ==
Richard Blackler (c. 1791 – 30 January 1876) married to Elizabeth Blackler née Parker ( –1851). He married again, to Mary Ford ( – ) in 1853

- Ellen Blackler (c. 1819 – 7 February 1914) married Henry Carwithen Ford (c. 1819 – 12 April 1885) in 1851, ran the Royal Arms Hotel, Port Adelaide
- Amelia Blackler (c. 1823 – 24 May 1844)
- John Blackler (c. 1823 – 7 September 1853)
- William Blackler (15 February 1827 – 26 June 1896) married Mary Harriet Walker (31 August 1842 – 29 June 1877) on 19 May 1859. Blackler may have married again, but no further information. His children included:

- Harriet Amelia Blackler (1860 – 10 February 1897) married jockey Tom Hales (1847 – 26 October 1901) on 24 August 1887; they lived in Melbourne
- William Allen Blackler (1862 – 24 October 1932) married Helene Seamond ( – 1948) in 1897

- Clarence William Blackler (1898–1982) married Doreen Sobels (1902–1987) in 1930
- Edna Helene "Tish" Blackler (1900–1991) married Dudley Cotton Cox (1898–1956) in 1922

- Ellen Elizabeth Blackler (16 June 1869 – ) married Henry Crozier (c. 1868 – ) on 27 May 1896

- Harriet Marion Crozier (10 March 1897 – )

- Richard Blackler (c. 1829 – 7 February 1899) married Sarah Davies (1836 – 27 December 1885) in 1859. He ran the Port Admiral Hotel.
