= 1946 War Honours (New Zealand) =

Military awards and appointments

The 1946 War Honours in New Zealand were appointments and awards by King George VI to recognise service in operations against the Japanese or in the South West Pacific in connection with World War II. They were announced on 11 January 1946.

The recipients of honours are displayed here as they were styled before their new honour.

== Order of the British Empire ==
=== Officer (OBE) ===
Additional
For conspicuous service in operations against the Japanese

- Acting Wing Commander Gavin Hannay Forrest – Royal New Zealand Air Force.
- Acting Wing Commander Ian Gordon Morrison – Royal New Zealand Air Force.
- Acting Wing Commander Henry Rodolph Wigley – Royal New Zealand Air Force.
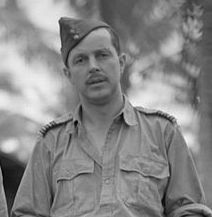
Ian Morrison

=== Member (MBE) ===
Additional
For conspicuous service in operations against the Japanese

- Acting Squadron Leader Edwin Perrett Richardson – Royal New Zealand Air Force.
- Flight Lieutenant Robert Francis Smillie – Royal New Zealand Air Force.
- Acting Flight Lieutenant Reginald Gustav Lund – Royal New Zealand Air Force.
- Flying Officer John Slingsby Barraud – Royal New Zealand Air Force.

== Distinguished Flying Cross (DFC) ==
For gallantry and devotion to duty in the execution of air operations in the South West Pacific area

- Acting Squadron Leader Francis Dewar Bethwaite – Royal New Zealand Air Force.
- Acting Squadron Leader James Ralph Court – Royal New Zealand Air Force.
- Flight Lieutenant Maurice Kidson AFM – Royal New Zealand Air Force.
- Flight Lieutenant Maxwell James Millener – Royal New Zealand Air Force.
- Flight Lieutenant John Parkes – Royal New Zealand Air Force.
- Flight Lieutenant Mervyn Keith Smith – Royal New Zealand Air Force.
- Flight Lieutenant Allan Archibald Watson – Royal New Zealand Air Force.
- Flight Lieutenant Walter Lemnos Winchester – Royal New Zealand Air Force.
- Pilot Officer Hamish Alexander Hogg – Royal New Zealand Air Force.
