= Billy Simpson (jockey) =

William Henry Simpson (c. 1840 – 5 March 1873) was a prominent jockey in the early days of South Australia, who has been called "the colonial Chifney" and "the Fred Archer of South Australia".

== History ==
Simpson was taught to ride by the noted trainer William Malcolm (c. 1813 – 25 November 1858) of "Wymondbury" at The Reedbeds, and was riding professionally when quite young. For some years he was employed by the Fisher brothers, then after they stopped racing was hired by other owners, among them Gabriel Bennett, Richard Holland and Thomas Ryan, and probably had more successes than any other contemporary jockey.

On 30 December 1864 during the first heat for the Ladies' Purse at Thebarton, Simpson was riding J. Filgate's horse "Bacchus", and soon after the start the horse ran close to one of the posts, and Simpson was thrown violently to the ground. It was believed Simpson lost concentration while looking around to see how his younger brother, aspiring jockey George Simpson (perhaps the George W. Simpson who was later Starter with Broken Hill Jockey Club), was faring. At first it was feared he had been killed, however he survived, but was forced to quit riding thoroughbreds, and took to training, and soon his services were in high demand. It was while fulfilling such a contract in Mount Gambier that he died of a lung infection.

Red haired and of ruddy complexion, Simpson was a model rider in every respect; fearless, determined, dependable and thoroughly trustworthy. Of a quiet disposition, his self-control gave him a great advantage when in the saddle. He was a splendid judge of horses, and as a trainer he was much sought after.
