= Charles Clark (Canterbury cricketer) =

New Zealand cricketer

Personal information
- Full name: Charles Reginald Clark
- Born: 26 July 1866; Christchurch, New Zealand
- Died: 15 September 1950 (aged 84); Christchurch, New Zealand

Domestic team information
- Years: Team
- 1895/96–1897/98: Canterbury

Career statistics
Competition	First-class
Matches	9
Runs scored	195
Batting average	17.72
100s/50s	0/1
Top score	61*
Balls bowled	248
Wickets	3
Bowling average	40.33
5 wickets in innings	0
10 wickets in match	0
Best bowling	1/16
Catches/stumpings	6/–
- Source: Cricinfo, 5 March 2024

Charles Reginald Clark (26 July 1866 – 15 September 1950) was a New Zealand cricketer and cricket administrator. He played nine first-class matches for Canterbury between 1895 and 1898.

Clark was born in Christchurch and educated at Christchurch Boys' High School before going to Exeter College, Oxford, where he obtained a Bachelor of Arts degree. When he returned to Christchurch he joined his father's auctioneering business.

Clark captained Canterbury in some of his matches in the 1890s. His highest score was 61 not out, when he captained Canterbury to victory over Auckland in Auckland in December 1897; he and William Wigley added 104 for the ninth wicket in the second innings. He later served on the Lancaster Park board, the Canterbury Cricket Association, and the New Zealand Cricket Council.

While captaining Canterbury, Clark encouraged and supported Arthur Sims in his early cricket career. In 1905 Clark guaranteed a bank loan of £10,000 to enable Sims and his business partner to establish a company exporting frozen meat from New Zealand.

Clark was a lifelong bachelor. Until the late 1930s he lived at "Thorrington", a large house established by his parents with extensive gardens, on the banks of the Heathcote River, and the venue for many garden parties.
