= John Moule =

Australian politician

John Moule (10 March 1845 – 22 March 1912) was a wheat merchant and politician in the colony of South Australia.

He was taken to the United States as a young boy, and by the time he was twenty had seen much of the world. He settled in South Australia around 1865 and took up employment, and later partnership, with Ernst Siekmann (c. 1830–1917), storekeeper and grain merchant of Saddleworth and Caltowie. He moved to Adelaide around 1879.

He was elected to the seat of Flinders in the South Australian House of Assembly and served from April 1884 to April 1896, his colleagues being Andrew Tennant followed by William Horn then Alexander Poynton. In 1893 for a short period he served as Commissioner of Public Works in the Downer Administration.

He died on the Melbourne Express, on which he was travelling to Ballarat, Victoria on mining business with the Hon. Sir Edward Lucas. J. H. Howe was an old friend.

== Family ==
John Moule married Harriet Brinkworth (1847 – 26 April 1914) on 23 March 1868; they lived at Saddleworth, then Marlbrough Street, East Adelaide, then "Pemberton", 35 Walkerville Road, East Adelaide. Their family included:

- Dr. Edward Ernst Moule (1869 – 20 July 1940) married Louisa Augusta Finn Taylor on 27 June 1900, practised in Wagin and other towns in Western Australia. He died after the car he was driving left the road.
- Elizabeth Florence Moule (1873 – 10 October 1900) married Dr. Bronte Smeaton (6 October 1873 – 1956), son of Thomas D. Smeaton, on 16 June 1900.
- Kate Harriet Moule (1874– )
- John William Moule (1876– ) married Catherine Annie Willoughby Heale (c. 1877 – 15 November 1944) in December 1909. He was metallurgist, manager of the Great Fitzroy mine, Queensland, Pernatty mines, South Australia, later in "Bannisdale", Kureen, near Malanda, Queensland.
- Charles Launcelot Moule (19 June 1879 – 19 October 1917) worked at Moonta. Served as Captain with 50th Battalion; died of wounds received in Belgium.
- Nelle Playford Moule (1880–1960) of East Adelaide

== See also ==
- Hundred of Moule
