= P. D. Prankerd =

English businessman

Peter Dowding Prankerd (1819 – 17 December 1902) was an English businessman who made a fortune in Colonial South Australia real estate.

== History ==
Prankerd was born in Langport, a son of John Prankerd, solicitor, and his wife Mary (died 22 June 1866).

In 1839 he emigrated to Australia, and operated for a time as a stock agent at Kangaroo Point, Queensland. By 1847 he was in Adelaide, and soon was in partnership with George Rolfe, dissolved May 1851. Prankerd left for England some time around 1849; returned in March 1850 aboard Samuel Boddington

From 1853 he regularly attended Government land sales, purchasing newly released country land to be leased by prospective farmers. Some he subdivided, and several townships in South Australia are the product of his enterprise.

In association with Robert Stuckey, Prankerd laid out a township in the Adelaide Hills which he named Stirling, in honor of his friend Edward Stirling, MLC. It was for a time called Stirling East to distinguish it from Stirling North in the Mid-North. He made a gift of land for a local school.

In 1856 Prankerd, Stuckey and John Bentham Neales formed a partnership to develop "New Melrose" (now simply Melrose) near Mount Remarkable.

In 1861 Prankerd purchased sections 372, 373 and 374, Hundred of MacDonnell, 8 km north of Port MacDonnell, and the following year laid out the township of "Allendale", later known as Allendale East. He donated land nearby on Section 247 for a Wesleyan Methodist chapel, named Kingsley Chapel.

In April 1864 he was elected a governor of St. Peter's College, where at least one of his sons was a student.

As a director and trustee of Moonta Mines, he was involved in the business side of the copper mining and smelting operations at Moonta and Wallaroo. A major facility at the mine, the Prankerd Engine, used for crushing and winding, was named for him. Its boiler exploded spectacularly in 1875.

He visited England aboard SS Rangatirain September 1870, returning January 1872 aboard SS Gothenburg, one of her last voyages before the tragic shipwreck. Mentions of his involvement with the Cape Yorke Eclipse Expedition may have mistaken him for someone of a similar name. The Prankerds left for England aboard SS South Australian on 27 December 1872, after making a gift to the people of Moonta of Block 259 in that town, adjacent the Baptist chapel, and another block to the residents of Langport, his subdivision on Moonta Bay. He later made gifts of £300 to the Deaf and Dumb Asylum. and £500 towards the proposed University of Adelaide.

He bought a large house "The Knoll" in Sneyd Park, Bristol. His interest in South Australian real estate continued, through his agent Frederick Wright.

== Named for Prankerd ==
There is a Prankerd Street in Moonta Bay township, and nearby are Percy, Herbert, Lucy and Edith streets.

He founded the Prankerd Scholarship at St. Peter's College.

== Family ==
Prankerd married Lucy Amelia Wright (c. 1821 – 16 August 1893) on 8 March 1856. She was the eldest daughter of Stephen Amand Wright and sister of architect Edmund Wright. Their family included:

- Percy John Prankerd (30 August 1859 – 24 November 1908), a solicitor, died in Tunbridge Wells
- Herbert Peter Prankerd (21 September 1861 – )
- Edith Lucy Mary Prankerd (4 March 1864 – )

They had a residence "Athelney", Hackney Road, Hackney, built 1858, later owned by Herbert Bristow Hughes then incorporated into St. Peter's College.
