= Benjamin Fisher =

Benjamin Fisher (23 December 1842 – 8 March 1920) was a South Australian accountant and auctioneer, remembered as a founder of the stock and station agents Bennett & Fisher.

== Life ==
Fisher was born in Kent, and educated at Greenwich Proprietary School and the City of London College. He was employed at the same London office for 20 years, eventually attaining the position of manager. In 1881 he arrived in Adelaide, and was employed for eight years with the firm of W. & T. Pope, solicitors of Eagle Chambers, King William Street. In 1889 he joined with land agent and livestock expert Gabriel Bennett as auctioneer and partner in the stock and station agents Bennett & Fisher, and he was connected with it until 1916, when he retired.

He was a man of genial disposition, travelled widely throughout the country for business and pleasure, accumulating a wide experience of Australian life and conditions, on which subjects he was an able raconteur. In business he was remembered as a man of absolute integrity, keen insight and utmost diligence.

He died after a long illness.

== Other interests ==
Fisher was a member of the Masonic Order and the Royal Agricultural and Horticultural Society.

He was also a proficient organist, and acted in that capacity for St. Peter's College and St. Bede's Church, Semaphore for some years.

He was also fond of sketching in pencil and watercolours.

He was part owner of a pastoral property.

=== Family ===
Benjamin Fisher (1842–1920) was twice married. His first wife died in England, and he married again to Clarissa Dane ( – 1938) before coming to Australia. He left a widow, three daughters and a son by his first wife, and a daughter and a son by his second wife:

- Thirza/Thurza Susannah/Sussana Frances "Ettie" Fisher (c. 1871 – 27 June 1954) married Herbert "Bert" Lander (1851 – 5 June 1949) on 29 August 1903, lived at "Whitefield", Eden Valley.
- Ella Constance "Connie" Fisher (c. 1873 – 29 August 1950) married William Holland Gillman (1873 – 4 November 1951) on 31 January 1896, lived at Gilberton or Walkerville, then Melbourne Street, North Adelaide.
- Agnes Fisher, of Perth, Western Australia
- (Benjamin) Harry Fisher (c. 1876 – 2 November 1960), manager of the Union Bank of Australia at Balmain, New South Wales, buried in Stirling, South Australia
- Clarissa Fisher ( – 4 November 1946) married Lancelot John Canaway (1879–1966) on 16 October 1908, lived at Mitcham, with Elder, Smith, & Co., Ltd., Adelaide.
- Francis William Fisher ( – 20 November 1940) married (Minnie) Coralie Duff (16 June 1885 – 1976) on 2 April 1914, lived at Hawthorn, Victoria; he died at Mosman, New South Wales

Fisher lived at Largs Bay, later (c. 1912) North Adelaide. His only sister died at Doncaster, Victoria, in January 1920. A brother died at Renmark c. 1918.
