= Bundaleer Station =

Pastoral lease that operated as sheep station in South Australia

Coordinates: 33.30842°S 138.59591°E

Location in South Australia

Bundaleer Station was a pastoral lease that operated as a sheep station in South Australia.

It is situated approximately 12 kilometres (7 mi) south of Jamestown and 21 kilometres (13 mi) north of Spalding.

The property was established in 1841 by John Bristow Hughes and occupied an area of 312 square miles (808 km^{2}).

In 1854, Charles Brown Fisher bought Bundaleer from Hughes for £31,000.

By 1864 it was estimated that the property was carrying about 80,000 sheep worth over £40,000.

== See also ==
- List of ranches and stations
