= Joanne Bonnar =

British journalist, presenter and producer

Joanne Bonnar is a reporter, presenter and producer for STV News in Central Scotland.

Bonnar primarily works as a presenter on the STV News on STV Glasgow, and on the late bulletins on STV. Joanne also reports on a variety of stories across the West region.
