= South Australian Tattersalls Club =

The first Tattersall's Club in Adelaide was founded in 1879 and folded in 1886. It was revived as the South Australian Tattersalls Club in 1888 and prospered as a gentlemen's club, whose membership was chiefly composed of men who enjoyed gambling on horse races.

== History ==
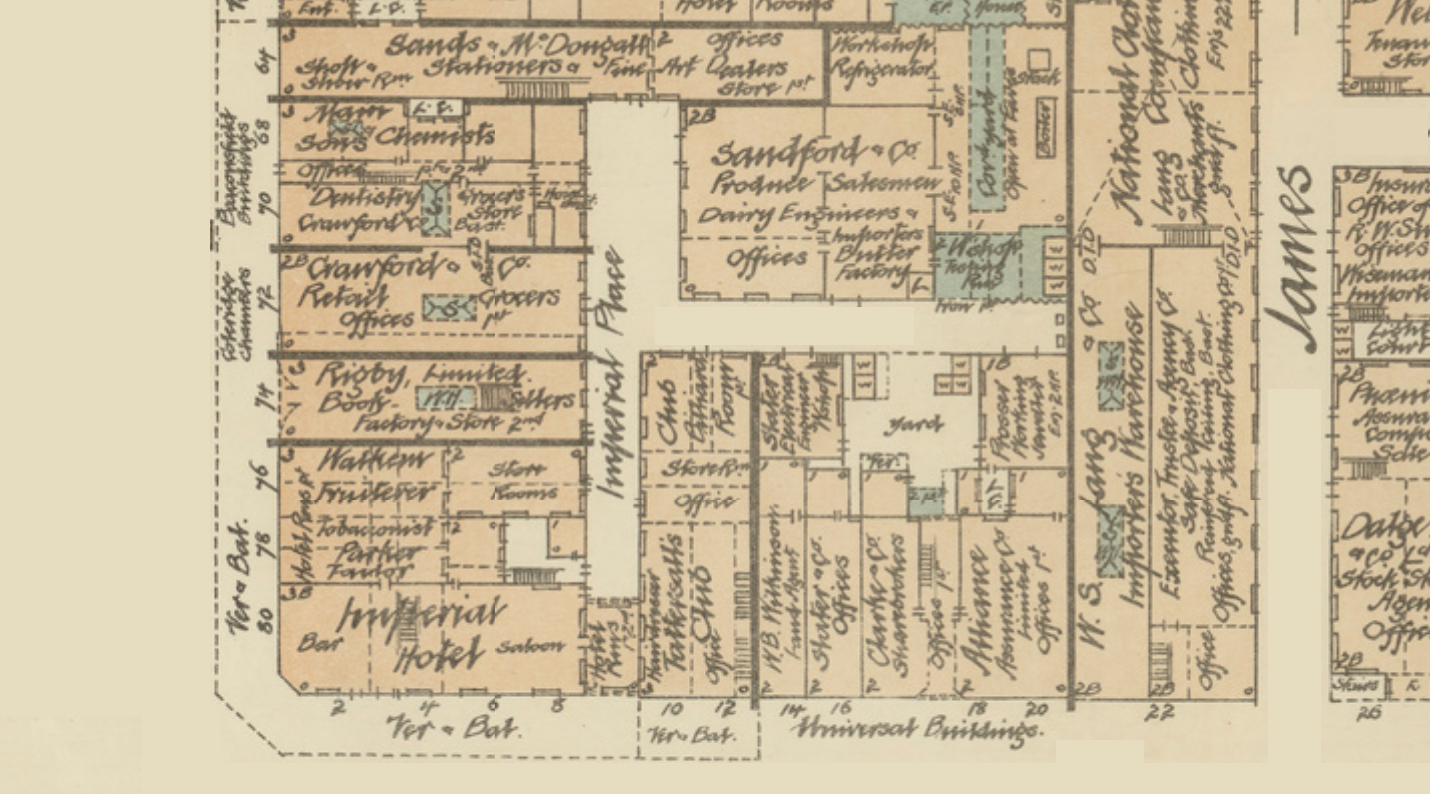
King Wm / Grenfell streets in 1911

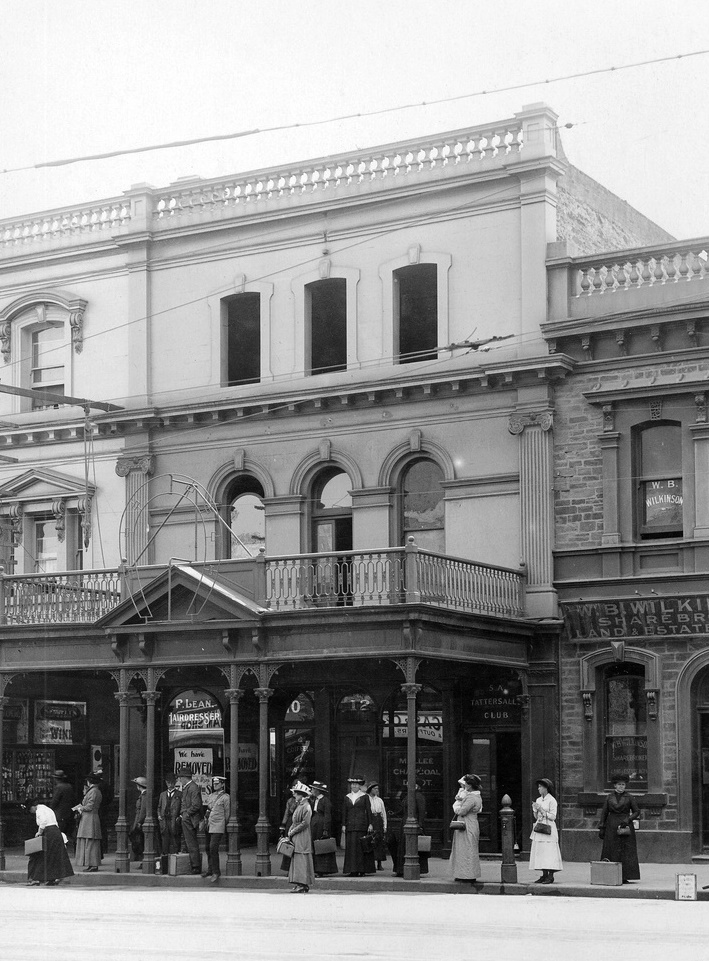
Tattersalls Club building 1916

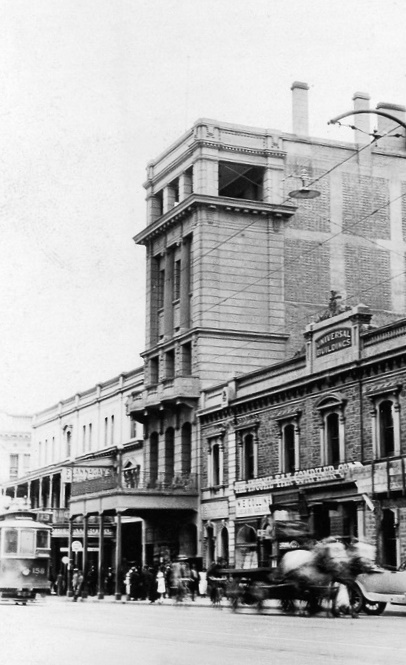
Tattersalls Club building 1926

The South Australian Tattersalls Club had its origin in a Tattersall's Club founded with 55 members on 27 May 1879, with similar rules and objectives to the Sydney and Melbourne Tattersalls Clubs. The meeting was held at the instigation of William Blackler at his Globe Hotel on Rundle Street, and several rooms in the hotel were set aside for the club's activities, principally gambling, no doubt to the benefit of bookmakers. Blackler then sold the publican's licence to fellow horse breeder J. H. Aldridge. Around this time the club moved its activities to John "Glenorchy" McDonald's Theatre Royal Hotel on Hindley Street, before returning to the Globe in May 1884. In 1886 the club folded.

=== A fresh start ===
In September 1888 Arthur John Usher, the Globe's new lessee, called a meeting at which a decision was made to form a new club to be called "South Australian Tattersalls Club" and take over the assets and debts of the old club. The new committee consisted of P. F. Bonnin (chairman). F. O. Bruce, George Boothby, William Pile, T. F. Wigley, S. J. Jacobs, E. W. Ellis, H. H. Young, and Dr. Cawley. with W. Filgate as secretary. In 1890 the club once again moved to the Theatre Royal Hotel.

In 1894 the club moved to a leased building on the north side of Grenfell Street and west of Gawler Place. The building was altered and furnished, and officially opened on 15 November 1894. Six years later the club purchased the premises for £3,000. The club's popularity grew, and soon the building was too small for the accommodation of members, and the committee embarked on an ambitious program of expansion, demolishing the old building and replacing it with one of four storeys, the tallest in the city. The new building, which cost the club approximately £29,000, was opened on 24 December 1917. Samuel J. Jacobs (1853–1937) has been credited with much of the club's success in this period.

The club premises were enlarged again in 1928, after purchase of adjoining and virtual duplication of the existing building. The new section was opened on 27 August 1928.

== Race meetings ==
The club conducted its own race meetings, initially at the Adelaide Racing Club's grounds Victoria Park on the East Parklands, the first being held on 5 October 1889 as a fund-raiser for three members of the committee successfully sued by Seth Ferry, who had been "posted" (i.e. suspended), for malpractice. D. Dunlevie was secretary for this meeting; the chief event was Tattersalls Cup, with prize money £90, and won by C. G. McMahon's Resolution.

The next fixture was on 15 March 1890; the first meeting to be conducted by James Moorhouse as secretary, other officials included William Blackler, S. J. Jacobs, W. K. Simms, and Dr. Cawley. James Chambers was judge and starter was one W. G. Bennett (perhaps Gabriel Bennett?). The club subsequently ran two meetings each year until 1902, then four in 1903. After being unable to reach an agreement with the A.R.C. for the following year's calendar, arranged with the South Australian Jockey Club to hold their meetings at Morphettville.

In 1914, the club decided on an additional three race per year, but could not be accommodated at Morphettville, so they arranged with the A.R.C. to hold the extra meetings at the "old course", Victoria Park, the first being held in February 1915. The club was charged 100 guineas per day by the host club for the use of their facilities.

In the early days the Tattersalls Cup raced over 1 mile (1,610 m); from 1900 to 1914 it was 1.5 miles (2,410 m); from 1915 to 1918, 1.75 miles (2,820 m); and since then 2 miles (3,220 m), the committee feeling that by increasing the length of the events it was assisting in improving the stamina of South Australian thoroughbreds. The minimum weight in all races was fixed at 7 stone (44 kg). The committee provided at each meeting one race for apprentices only, who have not ridden 20 winners, and they were not allowed to use either whips or spurs. In 1922 a new classic event, Tattersall's Stakes, was instituted for two-year-olds, carrying £500 in prize money.

== Office holders ==
Secretary

1879 H. J. Cohen
1879 Granville S. Price, "an enthusiastic secretary"
1881 E. W. Aldridge (either during or directly after his term of office, the position of secretary was paid at £100, later £300 p.a.)
1883 Thomas P. Fenner
1884 S. Barnard
1885–1886 William Filgate
(in recess)
1888–1890 William Filgate
1890–1911 James Moorhouse
1911–1913 John "Jack" Goffage (resigned after being criticised for acting as judge at Port Adelaide)
1913-1916 J. S. Malone (given leave of absence to join 1st AIF)
1916 James Moorhouse
1916–1917 F. W. White
1917 H. P. O'Brien (acting)
1919–1929 J. S. Malone (returned from overseas)
1929–1936 H. P. O'Brien

Chairman

1879– E. M. Bagot
1883–1885 W. B. Rounsevell
1885–1886 P. F. Bonnin
(in recess)
1888–1889 P. F. Bonnin
1889–1890 S. R. Wilson
1890–1906 S. J. "Sam" Jacobs
1906–1908 A. W. Ware
1908–1910 Edward Simms
1910–1917 S. J. "Sam" Jacobs
1917–1923 H. P. MacLachlan
1923–1925 H. Allan Morris
1925–1933 P. J. "Pat" Flannagan
1933–1938 H. Allan Morris
1942 H. Jackson perhaps
1954 J. F. Brazel

Membership

1887 55
1923 1,200
1928 1,500

== Other activities ==
With the improvements in facilities for members, the Tattersalls Club became known as a social club as well as a sporting club.

The club has been responsible for a number of benefactions; one of the earliest being a donation of £221 to the widow of James Breen, a steeplechase jockey, who was killed in the hunting field on 12 July 1879.

From 1890 the club held an annual amateur billiard tournament, regarded as one of the more important in the State.

== Notable members ==
Lewis Cohen, a prominent member of Tattersall's Club, was voted to the mayoral chair in 1909 despite fierce opposition from the Churches, who decried his open support for horse racing.

== See also ==
- City Tattersalls Club, founded 1895, one of two Tattersalls Clubs of Sydney
- Tattersalls Club, founded 1883 in Brisbane
- Tattersall's clubs, Melbourne, short-lived clubs conducted by rival bookmakers

Tattersall's Hotel, 17–19 Hindley Street, Adelaide (1881–), previously named "Blenheim Hotel", and still operating in 1962, was not related to the club.
