= Scott Bonnar =

Australian engineer (c. 1893 – 1961)

Scott Bonnar (c. April 1893 – 1961) was a South Australian engineer, founder of a company which manufactured a range of lawn mowers and other implements, including the "Model 45" reel, or cylinder, mower.

== Early life and education ==
Scott Bonnar was born around April 1893 at 57 Watkins Street, Newtown, Sydney, a son of J. J. Bonnar, jun. (1861–1938) and grandson of solicitor J. J. Bonnar. Nothing has been found of his childhood and youth. He may have attended Gilles Street Primary School.

== Career ==
In 1919 Bonnar had a workshop in Bloor Court, off Currie Street, Adelaide, sharpening lawnmower blades.

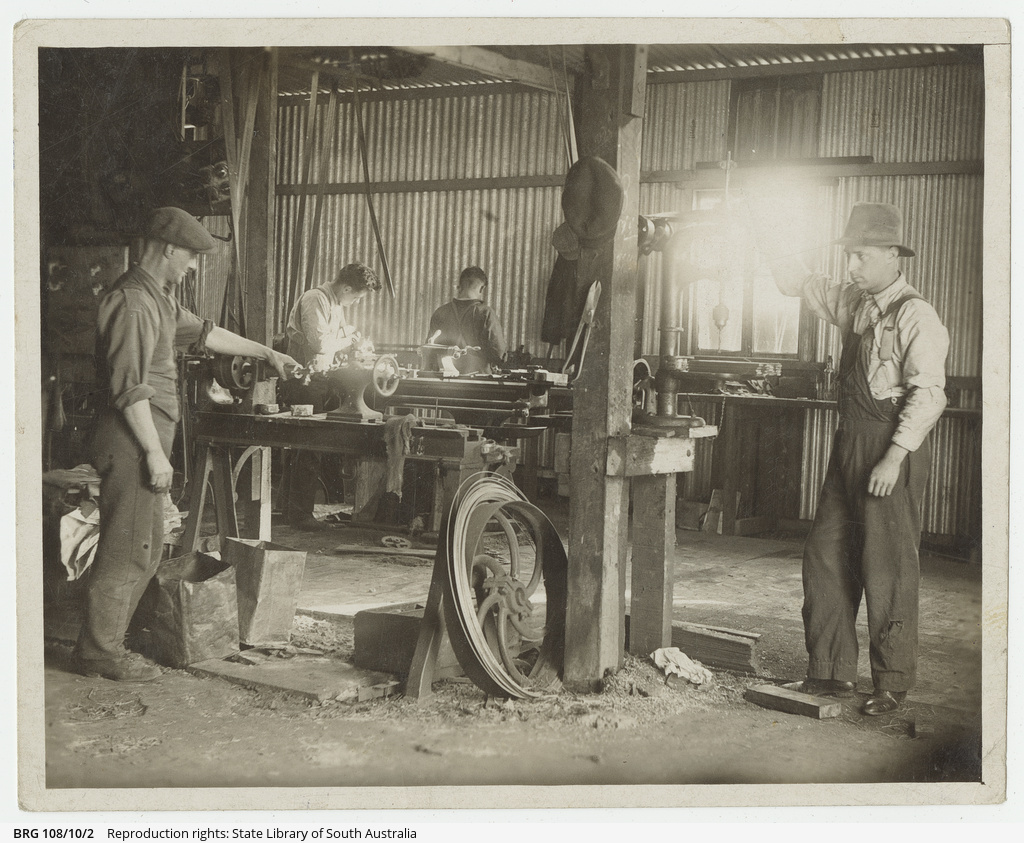
Scott Bonnar with workers in his machine shop at Chapel Street, Thebarton, 1921

A company was founded in 1920 by Bonnar and his brother Malcolm Cornelius Bonnar. It is likely, but not certain, that Malcolm was already working as a brass founder. They set up a welding workshop and brass-foundry at 3 Chapel Street, Thebarton, South Australia, manufacturing brassware until at least 1927. By 1924 Scott Bonnar & Co. had a workshop at 22 Mill Street, Adelaide, repairing and regrinding lawn mowers.

In 1926 Scott Bonnar Ltd was formed with £10,000 capital, to take over the business, with shareholders Malcolm Cornelius Bonnar, Scott Bonnar, Percy J. A. Lawrence, Frank William Rose, and H. Gill Williams, all of Adelaide. In that year they began selling electric lawnmowers.

Developments in the 1920s includes a mower which cut a 14-foot (4 metre) swathe while leaving minimal tyre-tracks.

By 1939 their factory was located between Beans Road and Holland Street, Southwark, South Australia. By 1948 they were also making electric hedge trimmers.

In 1950 Scott Bonnar Ltd, lawnmower and brassware manufacturers, was restructured as a public company, whose directors were M. C. Bonnar, M. F. Bonnar, L. W. Harris and A. L. Slade. Bonnar himself took no active part in the company, and removed to Manly, New South Wales. In its first year of trading shareholders received a 12.5% dividend.

The brand "Bonmow" appeared in 1954, for a self-propelled 14-inch reel mower.

The "Model 45" first appeared around 1968, and came out in three reel widths: 14, 17 and 20 inches (36, 43, 51 cm) and three power options: petrol, mains electricity and battery. They also manufactured a "rotary mower", similar to the famous "Victa" brand.

The company was taken over by the manufacturer of Rover mowers, but the Southwark factory did not close until much later.

== Family ==
John James Bonnar (c. 1819 – 29 July 1905) solicitor of Blakiston and Strathalbyn, South Australia married Lucy Anderson (c. 1825 – 3 September 1904) on 2 September 1848. He died in Manly, New South Wales.

- Fourth son John James Bonnar (28 January 1861 – 1938) of Carrieton, mayor of Gladstone in 1884, married Mary Cornelius (c. 1867 – 16 August 1937) of Strathalbyn in 1887; in 1915 living at Rosslyn Park; they left Renmark for Unley in 1937; their sons included:

- Malcolm Cornelius Bonnar (1888– ) married Lorna Gibbins ( – ) of Westbourne Park in 1919

- Malcolm Faxton Bonnar (1921– )

- Scott Bonnar (c. April 1893 – 1961) married Isabel Ruby Jean Fiveash (25 May 1890 – ) in 1914; they lived at 92 Unley Road, Unley; by 1953 were living in Surry Hills, Sydney

- David Fiveash Bonnar (1 Oct 1914 – 9 Dec 1952)
- Diana Isabel Bonnar (born 30 July 1923) maybe married Julius Grosz of Hungary.
