= Anchor Foods =

Australian food company

Anchor Foods Pty. Ltd.
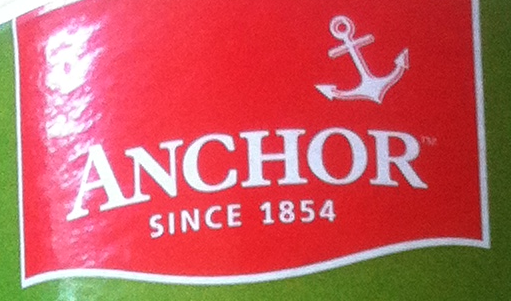

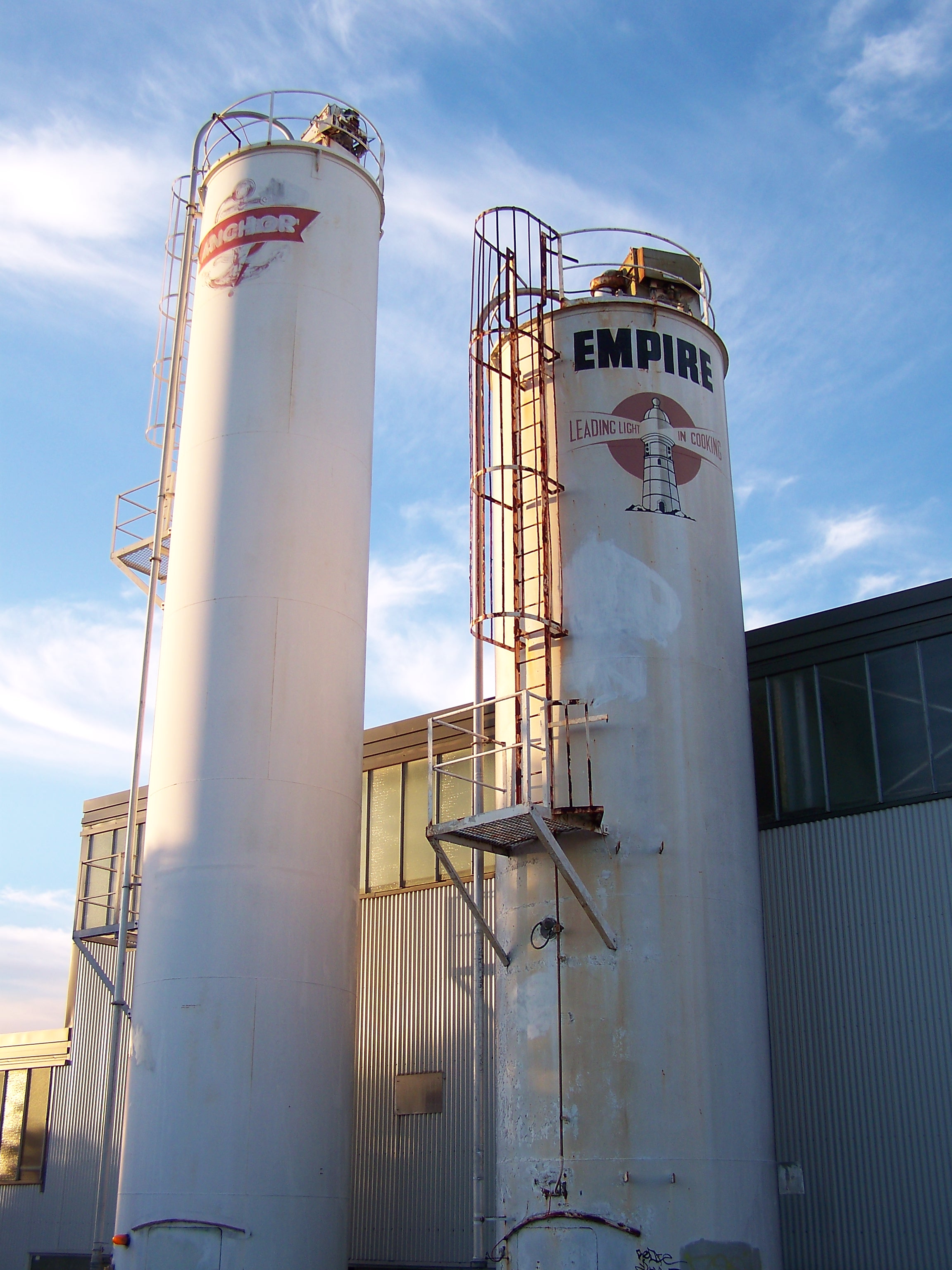
- Anchor Foods factory in Fremantle
- Company type: Limited Company
- Industry: Food
- Founded: 1854; 171 years ago in Adelaide, South Australia, Australia
- Founder: Gilbert Wood
- Headquarters: Fremantle, Australia
- Key people: David Clapin
- Number of employees: 120 (2009)
- Website: www.anchorfoods.com.au

Anchor Foods or Anchor Foods Pty. Ltd. is an Australian food company based in Western Australia.

== History ==
The company was founded by Gilbert Wood, a mariner and merchant from the Shetland Islands who took possession of an unpaid cargo and opened his own store. The original store was named G. Wood, Son & Co. and was based in Angas Street in Adelaide in South Australia. The company was a partnership between Wood, his son Peter and an employee named James Gartrell. They soon expanded with stores being established in Broken Hill, New South Wales and Fremantle in Western Australia.

The recipe book named Anchor Ann was released by the company in 1925. By the 1930s, the range of products released by the company was extensive including dried fruit, jellies, pastry products, tea and coffee.

=== Ownership ===
Bennett & Fisher Limited acquired the company in 1978.

Goodman Fielder owned the company in 1986 and had an annual turnover of A$100 million, but 15 years later turnover had reduced to A$15 million.

David Clapin acquired the business in 2002 for A$7 million with the intention of growing the company and repackaging all of the 500 products it offers. In 2006 the annual turnover was A$26 million which increased to A$32 million in 2009. Staff numbers increased from 80 in 2007 to 120 in 2009.

== Products and headquarters ==
The company produces an extensive of products for the retail, food service and commercials markets including; flour, vinegar, birdseed, cordial, herbs and spices and cooking aids. Currently it has a range of 800 products.

The current factory and office buildings located in Carrington Street in Fremantle were built in the 1970s. The offices were significantly upgraded in 2011 to a more modern open plan.
