= George Sydney Aldridge =

Australian businessman (1847–1911)

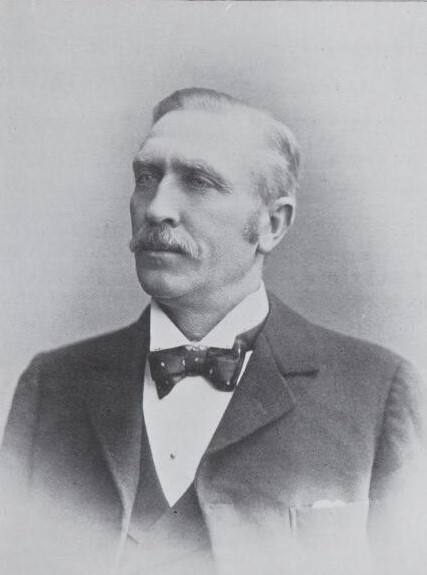
- Born: 23 July 1847; London, UK
- Died: 21 August 1911 (aged 64)
- Occupation: Businessman
- Family: James Henry Aldridge (brother)

George Sydney Aldridge (23 July 1847 – 21 August 1911) was an Australian businessman, a longtime president of the Adelaide Stock Exchange.

== History ==
Aldridge was born in London, the son of George Aldridge sen. (c. 1817 – 12 December 1879), and brought to South Australia by his parents when only a few months old. He was educated at St Peter's College when Archdeacon Farr was head master, and was a brilliant student, gaining the highest marks at the competitive examination when Richard Graves MacDonnell, Governor of South Australia, was president of the board of governors. After leaving college Aldridge worked in various business houses as a clerk and accountant. In 1868 he joined G. W. Goyder's expedition to the Northern Territory. Three years afterwards, he joined, with J. le M. F. J. Servante and Wickliffe Snow, the mining boom in the Northern Territory, where they discovered the Woolwonga Mine, which they worked successfully for 12 months, then Aldridge went on to the Sandy Creek diggings and was doing well until an attack of malaria forced him to return to Adelaide.

He next went into partnership with his old school friend Theodore Bruce, as auctioneers. (Note: These partners, both born in 1847, married the McFie sisters, died within a few months of each other, and were both cremated.) Next he, Bruce and W. T. Perrers (1849–1897) founded a brewery in Port Augusta. In 1888 Aldridge became a member of the Stock Exchange, and succeeded founding president Henry Bellingham (1807–1889), a position he held with distinction for a little over 13 years, encompassing both the Broken Hill and Kalgoorlie booms.

Aldridge died on 21 August 1911. The Stock exchange was closed as a mark of respect as soon as his death was announced, and again on the day of his funeral.

== Family ==
Aldridge married Marion McFie (c. 1860 – 9 July 1953) on 20 October 1880. They had no children. She was active in patriotic charities, notably the Cheer-Up Society during World War I.

James Henry Aldridge (4 July 1849 – 11 November 1929), hotelier and horse racing aficionado, was a brother.
