= Thomas Drury Smeaton =

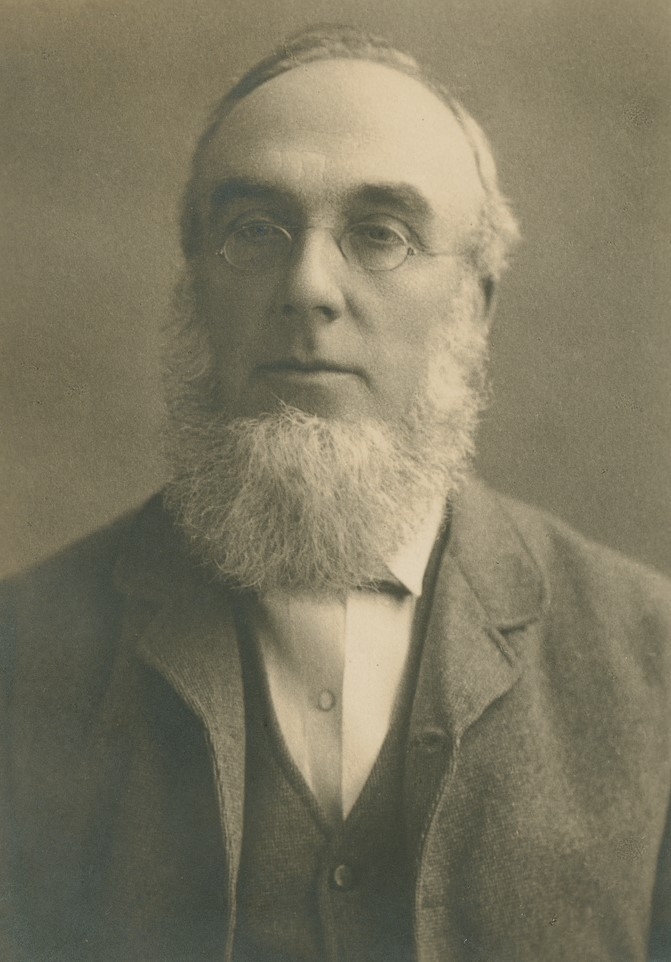

Thomas Drury Smeaton (c. 1831 – 18 February 1908) trained in England as an engineer, emigrated to the British colony of South Australia, where he was known as a banker and amateur scientist.

== History ==
Thomas Smeaton was born in London "within sound of Bow Bells", and trained as an engineer. He was sponsored by the South Australian Company to emigrate to South Australia, but finding no opening for an engineer joined the company's financial institution, the Bank of South Australia as a clerk sometime before 1856, later as the bank's accountant. In 1864 he was appointed manager of the newly formed branch in Robe, where he was an active as President of the Robe Institute, and where his wife, a popular Sunday-school teacher, died in childbirth. He returned to the Adelaide head office as assistant manager, and served as manager on numerous occasions between 1870 and 1884 when he retired to his home "Dalebank" in Blakiston. Around 1904 he moved to Mount Lofty, where he died after some months in poor health. His wife Selina later lived at Brunswick Road, Dulwich.

== Other interests ==
Smeaton was a well-read man, both of literature and scientific subjects, of which he had a wide knowledge and great enthusiasm. He became a member of the Adelaide Philosophical Society in 1857, and joint honorary secretary in 1860. Professor Stirling was a firm friend, as was Professor (later Sir) Robert Chapman of Adelaide University.

An article by him on rainbows was published in Nature; he regularly contributed articles to The Register, and he corresponded with many authors of Encyclopædia Britannica articles, offering useful criticism.

He was a member of the Adelaide Hospital Board for some years, and was one of the founders and longtime honorary secretary of that hospital's Good Samaritan Fund.

== Family ==
He married Mary Ann Green (c. 1828 – 16 December 1865) who died in childbirth at Robe. He married again, in 1871, to Selina (Selena?) Jane Witt ( – 13 May 1920); their children included:

- Anatole Smeaton (1859 – 17 July 1940) married Enos Heli Lock ( – 9 July 1921) on 6 December 1888
- Stirling Smeaton B.A., A.M.I.C.E. (30 October 1860 – 12 March 1909), one of the first two graduates from University of Adelaide; railway engineer then with the Engineer-in-Chief's department. Noted field naturalist, he never married.
- Edna Smeaton (4 January 1868 – 25 January 1954) married Thomas Luscombe Wright ( – ) on 15 August 1895

- Drury Luscombe Wright (c. June 1898 – 11 April 1917) was killed in France during World War I

- Fabrian Smeaton (17 June 1869 – 20 June 1906), died at Mount Lofty
- Ida Smeaton (18 March 1871 – 1957)
- Dr. Bronte Smeaton (6 October 1873 – 1956) married Elizabeth Florence Moule (1873 – 10 October 1900) on 16 June 1900. Elizabeth was a daughter of John Moule MHA. He married again, to Josephine Lucie Cordelia "Jo" Wigley (1877–1961), daughter of Glenelg mayor Henry Rodolph Wigley, on 18 May 1904. They lived at Blakiston, then Mount Barker, later Barton Terrace, North Adelaide. He was medical superintendent of Adelaide Hospital for a few years then had a practice at Mount Barker where he was a prominent citizen and member of Adelaide Hunt Club.

- Dr. (Bronte) Creagh Smeaton (15 November 1905 – 19 March 1950) married Morna Dunn Dobbie (2 November 1904 – ) in 1932. They had two sons and a daughter. He specialized as anaesthetist, later as radiologist in Adelaide. Morna was a daughter of Arthur Chapman Dobbie and a teacher of the Margaret Morris method of barefoot dancing.
- Joan Mary Smeaton (18 February 1909 – )
- Patricia Constance Smeaton (1913– )
- John Anthony Smeaton (1916– )

- Raymond Smeaton (19 January 1876 – 27 August 1921) married Gertrude Margaret Jones (1875–) on 26 December 1903; he was manager of the Blyth, then Tumby Bay, Mount Pleasant and Murray Bridge branches of the Bank of Adelaide. Mrs. Smeaton was a prominent socialite.

- Margaret Condon "Greta" Smeaton (1908– ) married William Cave Howard (12 May 1905 – ) on 14 January 1933.

- Graham Smeaton (21 December 1877 – 26 April 1949) married Helena Winifred "Nell" Maynard ( – ) in 1920. He was manager of C. Wright's estate on the Bay Road.

There is no evidence of his being closely related to the South Australian politician Thomas Hyland Smeaton.

Miss Matilda Witt (c. 1830 – 9 January 1930), Mrs Smeaton's sister, lived with them at "Dalebank", Blakiston, afterwards at Nairne.
