= J. J. Bonnar =

John James Bonnar (c. 1818 – 29 July 1905) was a schoolteacher and lawyer in the early days of the colony of South Australia.

== History ==
Bonnar emigrated to South Australia aboard Warrior, arriving in South Australia (dep from London 17 November 1839, via Plymouth) on 17 April 1840. He married Lucy Anderson (1826–1904) on 2 September 1848 at St James Church, Blakiston, South Australia. She had arrived in the colony aboard Anna Robertson with her parents and siblings on 20 September 1839. The Bonnars opened a school at Mount Barker in 1846 His schoolroom was used for Sunday services by Rev. James Pollitt in the absence of a Presbyterian church building in the town.

His brother, Henry Bonnar ( – ), third son of James Bonnar, surgeon, RN, had a school near Mount Barker Springs in 1855 He then had a school in Shellharbour, New South Wales from 1859 followed by the school in nearby Kiama. His wife Emily, née Ellis, died in March 1863. He married again on 3 September 1863 to Julianna Collie of Wollongong. He returned to South Australia and in 1868 opened a school in Strathalbyn, which flourished and had to be expanded several times, but Bonnar had difficulty managing the larger school and was in 1880 transferred to Morphett Vale. His subsequent movements are yet to be found. Some later accounts of the history of Mount Barker appear to confuse or conflate these two Bonnars and their schools.

In the early 1850s or perhaps earlier, Bonnar began practising as a solicitor in Mount Barker. When or how he was admitted to the bar is not known, but it is clear that he had a training in a lawyer's office. In 1865 he transferred his head office to Strathalbyn, and took as a partner Joseph James Whitby to handle the Mount Barker office. A year later the partnership was dissolved, and Bonnar took into partnership William Steele, who died in August 1868. By this time other lawyers, T. Goddard and William Walker had opened offices in Mount Barker, and Bonnar allowed this side of his business to lapse.

On 11 June 1866, Louis von Doussa was articled to Bonnar at Strathalbyn, and was admitted to the Bar in November 1871. He then resumed the old Mount Barker legal business and began practice there early in 1872. He since made a name for himself, which business was carried on by his grandson, William von Doussa. Other solicitors who served their articles with Bonnar were Mr. Justice Gordon and E. J. Tucker, of Strathalbyn.

After practising in Strathalbyn for ten years he moved to Gladstone, where he stayed for some time. He then moved to Armidale, New South Wales at the time of the mining boom, and practised there before retiring to Manly. He died at "Dunreath", Manly, New South Wales and his remains were interred in the Manly Cemetery.

== Other interests ==
- He was Secretary of the Mount Barker Agricultural Association in 1850

== Family ==
John James Bonnar age 27, married Lucy Anderson, age 22 (1 July 1826 – 4 September 1904) on 2 September 1848 at St.James Church, Blakiston S.A. She was a daughter of William Anderson and Catherine Lindsay Anderson née Lintott (c. 1792 – 2 August 1874), who arrived in South Australia aboard Anna Robertson on 20 September 1839. Their large family included:

- Margaret Catherine Bonnar (25 May 1849 – c. 5 March 1908)
- William Bonnar (4 January 1851 – 13 January 1874)
- James Bonnar (16 January 1853 – 1 June 1854); buried St James Anglican Cemetery, Blakiston
- James Pillans (Note: Born 'James Bonnar' at Mount Barker, Page Number: 36 Volume Number:5. Research is required find when he acquired the second forename, Pillans.) Bonnar (11 September 1854 – 23 September 1922) was a notable citizen of Armidale, New South Wales married Mary Winnifred Trim (c. 1868 – 23 May 1907) in 1892. He was mayor of Armidale for part of 1907. He was licensee of Armidale's Central and Royal Exchange hotels, found insolvent, later a representative of Silk Bros., fruit merchants of Sydney.
- Hannah "Dottie" Bonnar (16 September 1856 – 3 August 1933) married Thomas Alsop Brock (c. 1848 – 8 March 1932) on 25 April 1876
- (Thomas) Lambert Bonnar (12 August 1858 – 31 July 1921) married Catherine "Kitty" or "Katie" Sleep (1864 – 1 January 1940) on 9 December 1884. He was manager Oladdie Station, later of Perth, W.A., died in Kalgoorlie.

- (Lucy) Lurline Bonnar (18 September 1885 – )
- Catherine Naughton Hazel Bonnar (16 July 1888 – )

- John James Bonnar (28 January 1861 – 14 July 1938) was mayor of Gladstone in 1885, married Mary Cornelius (c. 1867 – 16 August 1937) on 26 March 1887; lived Renmark then Unley.

- Malcolm Cornelius "Mick" Bonnar MM (14 January 1888 – 1975) married Lorna Gibbins (died 1962) in 1919. Managing Director, Scott Bonnar & Co., brass workers of Chapel Street, Thebarton; later lawnmower manufacturers.

- Gwenyth Margaret Bonnar (7 November 1923 – )

- Scott Bonnar (c. 1893 – 1961) married Isabel Ruby Jean Fiveash (25 May 1890 – ) in 1914. He was the founder of Scott Bonnar & Co., lawnmower manufacturers.

- David Fiveash Bonnar (1 Oct 1914 – )
- Diana Isabel Bonnar (born 30 July 1923) maybe married Julius Grosz of Hungary.

- Fred Stanley Bonnar (16 November 1903 – ) married Violet Elizabeth Louise Hocking on 17 June 1933
- Maxwell James Bonnar (9 September 1905 – 28 August 1975) married Dorothy May Edwards on 23 August 1930; lived Goodwood Road, Wayville

- Lucy Lindsay Lenlot Bonnar (27 July 1862 – 1920)
- Robert Wright Bonnar (12 August 1864 – 31 July 1956) married (Rosa? Rose?) Lillian Skewes (1879 – ) on 28 December 1909.
- George Lindsay Bonnar (26 April 1867 – 19 June 1919), miner, married Annie ??, died Greenbushes, Western Australia
- Kate Bonnar (22 October 1868 – 1913) married Francis G. Dawson in 1907
