= The Reedbeds =

Former freshwater wetlands in South Australia

The Reedbeds was in the 19th and early 20th centuries the generally recognised name for an area of seasonal freshwater wetlands to the west of Adelaide, South Australia comprising the floodplains of the River Torrens, and drained to Gulf St Vincent by the tidal estuaries of the Port River and the Patawalonga River. The ephemeral wetland was known as Witongga tarto (meaning 'low swampy reed country') to the indigenous Kaurna people. The area was also formerly known as the Cowandilla Plains. The wetlands were inundated annually by the winter flows of the River Torrens, and supported an abundance of wildlife, a valuable source of food for the Kaurna people during their summer camps along the coastal barrier dunes.

The area of the Reedbeds is roughly congruent with the present-day suburbs of Cowandilla, Fulham, Lockleys, Underdale and West Beach, including the Adelaide Airport.

Capt. Charles Sturt, famous for his exploration of the Murray River, was one of the early settlers in the Reedbeds. He acquired 160 hectares (390 acres) of land in the northern portion and built his home there in 1840, naming it The Grange.

Another early settler in the area was John White (? – 30 December 1860), who arrived in the colony in 1836 and founded "Fulham Farm", named for the London suburb that was his former home. He was succeeded by his son Samuel White (c. 1835 – 16 November 1880), and grandson Samuel Albert White (1870–1954)

A typical settler in the area may have been James Leason (c. 1821 – 29 July 1908), an undistinguished but hard-working and enterprising farmer who took over "St James farm" in 1859, and when he left the area in 1877 his lease of 120 hectares (300 acres) had 96 hectares (236 acres) under wheat, and was running 27 horses and 36 fat cattle.

Charles Fisher and his brother Hurtle, and William Blackler were noted horse breeders in the area.

The Reedbeds Cavalry was a short-lived (1860–1870) unit of the South Australian Militia (later known as the South Australian Volunteer Force) of which Gabriel Bennett and W. H. Gray of "Frogmore" were prominent officers.
