= James Henry Aldridge =

Australian horse breeder and hotelier (1849–1929)

James Henry Aldridge (4 July 1849 – 11 November 1929) was a horse breeder and hotelier in South Australia. He founded the Richmond Park Stud in the Adelaide suburb of Richmond.

J. H. Aldridge, as he was generally known, or "Jim" to his friends, was born at Kensington, South Australia, the son of George Aldridge (c. 1817 – 12 December 1879), who emigrated to South Australia in 1847. Before the advent of the Adelaide Town Hall there were three city venues for public functions: Neale's Rooms, White's Rooms and Aldridge's Rooms, all on King William Street. Aldridge's Rooms, which appears in newspaper advertisements between 1860 and 1863, was mentioned as a strong argument against the building of a Town Hall. It is probable that this venue became the Prince Alfred Hotel (alongside the Town Hall), which George Aldridge opened in 1869, and remained its proprietor.

Aldridge was educated at St Peter's College, and immediately after leaving school joined G. W. Goyder's party surveying the Northern Territory. On his return to the city, he joined the telegraph party working in the Roper River area. He then drove a herd of bullocks to the Northern Territory diggings, and sold them for a good profit. In 1879 he purchased from William Blackler the publican's licence to the Globe Hotel (the popular resort of sportsmen, and home of the Tattersalls Club, of which he remained a member) in Rundle Street and managed it for nine years. He left the "Globe" to become first licensee of the Grand Hotel, Broken Hill 1888–1893 in the midst of a mining boom. To escape the smelter's fumes he built a home and farm between Thorndale and the aerodrome. Then from 1898 to around 1907 he was the lessee of the newly rebuilt Gresham Hotel 1–9 King William Street, Adelaide.

== Horse Racing ==
In 1890 Aldridge, who was a keen follower of the turf, decided to establish a stud farm. He purchased the Sydney stallion Carlyon for 1,000 guineas, and a dozen brood mares, including Brown Alice, Queensdale, Tuberose, Thora, Atholine, Queen of Nations, and Sylvan Queen. He secured a property "Richmond Park" off Richmond Road, South Australia, later to become part of West Beach Airport, and quickly made a name for himself as a breeder, and Carlyon soon won fame as a sire, for a time topping the winning sires' list in South Australia. Among his progeny were St David, Carlton, winner of a Newmarket Handicap, Gunga Din (Adelaide Cup), Antilles (City Handicap and Birthday Cup), Lord Carlyon (Goodwood Handicap), Dirk Hammerhand (S.A. St Leger), Troubridge (Fulham Park Plate), St Vincent and Aline (Fulham Park Plate), Rienzi (S.A. Derby), Bay Lavender (A.R.C. Grand National Hurdles).

In 1905 Carlyon was severely injured, and although still fit to do duty, Aldridge procured another sire, Pistol (a son of Carbine), from England. His foals were good looking, and they topped the market. Like the Carlyons, the Pistols proved their worth on the race course, and after successful careers on the flat won an A.E.C. Grand National Steeplechase, two local Grand National Steeplechases, three Grand National Hurdles, one V.R.C. Grand National Hurdles, one V.R.C. Grand National Steeplechase, and two Australian Hurdles.

Aldridge next purchased St Anton, a crack sprinter, from England. His stock won over all distances on the flat, and have proved themselves jumpers of no mean order. His next import from England was Lucknow, whose stock were also successful racers.

A report that "Richmond Park" was named for the great horse Richmond owned by Eli Jellett (c. 1835–1911) and subsequently by Aldridge, and the origin of the suburb of Richmond is fanciful.

== The Fire ==
Early in the morning on 4 November 1907, Aldridge's residence was destroyed by fire. No-one was harmed, and the stables were unaffected. The fire resulted in the loss of family memorabilia, stud records and racing illustrations and trophies. The fire possibly originated from a spark blowing from an open fireplace, aggravated by strong winds.

== Family ==
His brother George Sydney Aldridge (c. 1847 – 21 August 1911) was for many years Chairman of the Adelaide Stock Exchange. Other brothers were active in hotel management: George Edward "Ted" Aldridge was licensee of the Duke of Cornwall Hotel in Broken Hill. Charles E. Aldridge (1858 – ) had the Crown and Sceptre Hotel on King William Street near the Railway Station in 1883. Fred C. Aldridge (1853 – ) later had the Crown and Sceptre. A sister, Rose Annie Aldridge, married architect John Grainger (1854–1917), and is famous as the mother of Percy Grainger.

In 1880 Aldridge married Sarah Carr Aldridge ( – c. 27 July 1916), daughter of John Carr, an engineer and member of an English ship building family. Their children included:

- George Richmond Aldridge (9 June 1880 – 16 June 1944) married Gladys Lennox on 30 August 1921 settled at Mount Gambier, then Bendigo, became handicapper for S.A.J.C.
- Leslie Frank Aldridge (13 January 1883 – ) married Edith Maud Turnbull on 17 March 1910 settled at "Kingsclere" in Richmond, South Australia. He had, with D. C. "Dan" Cudmore (a son of J. F. Cudmore), a substantial interest in the stud at "Richmond Park", which in 1929 they moved to "Kismet Park" (owned by Sir Rupert Clarke) in Sunbury, Victoria.
- James William Aldridge (c. April 1888 – ) married Georgina "Rene" Fuller on 28 June 1917 settled at Booboorowie, bred horses and, notably, pigs (Berkshire and Tamworth) later at "Bridge Park", Angle Vale where he bred Large White and Gloucester Spots.
- Harry Richmond Aldridge (18 January 1891 – 3 January 1976) married Kathleen Rischbieth Jury (4 July 1897 – 24 May 1981), a granddaughter of Charles Rischbieth. He ran Illeroo station, west of Port Augusta near Wilmington, South Australia and Westward Downs Station north of Broken Hill
- Maud Rose Aldridge ( – 18 October 1920) married John Primrose Malcom on 16 September 1908
- Violet Aldridge married R. R. Marshall on 2 April 1913 and settled in Melbourne
- Margaret Daisy Aldridge married John H. Morish on 15 November 1911, settled at Millswood
