= Thomas Francis Wigley =

Thomas Francis Wigley (c. 1854 – 14 January 1933) was a lawyer and horse racing official in South Australia.

== History ==
Wigley was the third son of influential businessman J. F. Wigley and educated at St Peter's College under Archdeacon Farr, and on leaving school was articled to his uncle William Wigley of Glenelg and called to the Bar in 1879. He had a practice in Port Augusta before moving to Adelaide.

He invested in BHP shares, which made him quite wealthy, and was able to take an extensive tour of Europe with his wife where they purchased, among other works, the painting A Sea-Spell by Dante Gabriel Rossetti. The painting hung in the Art Gallery of South Australia in April and May 1899, along with 14 others of his recent purchases: a flower study by Henri Fantin-Latour and three landscapes by Frank Walton, then was in Mrs Wigley's South Yarra residence for some years before being exhibited in the McArthur Gallery of the State Library of Victoria.

== Horse racing ==
On his return he became interested in racing, and purchased two bay colts, Cheddar, who won for him the 1890 South Australian Derby, and Norwood, who won the 1891 St. Leger, but later had to be killed on account of lameness. He took the 1893 Morphettville Plate with La Cheville, which he had leased from William Blackler and paid handsomely. He took the Adelaide Hunt Club Cup with Zulu, and other good races with St George and other horses.

In his obituaries Wigley is credited with doing the bankrupt South Australian Jockey Club a valuable service when the Morphettville Racecourse was put up at auction by order of the mortgagee. According to this account Wigley and Sylvester John Browne purchased the property and later handed it over at the purchase price to the revived S.A.J.C., formed by Sir Richard Baker and Mr. A. O. Whitington.

The facts are a little more involved: the club and the Racecourse failed in 1883 shortly after the Totalizator (whose profits the Club had come to rely on) was outlawed by Parliament. The Queensland Mortgage Company, who had lent the Club £6000 for improvements, then exerted their rights and resumed the property, which as an unimproved site had been made over to the Club by Thomas Elder on very generous terms. In 1888 Parliament reversed its ban on the Totalizator, and it was only then that Wigley, Browne and (briefly) R. B. Pell stumped up with the £8,000 purchase price. Subsequently Browne purchased Pell's interest. Wigley then approached Arthur Whitington with a view to reviving the S.A.J.C. and a well-attended meeting was held on 19 September 1888, presided by Sir Richard Baker, and a committee elected to re-form the Club. The committee agreed to lease the Morphettville course from Browne and Wigley for £900 per annum with a right to purchase for £12,000 after four years. The first race meeting at the revived Morphettville was held on 1 January 1889, despite a downpour of 3 inches (76 mm). In July 1889 Wigley and Browne placed the racecourse on the market in order to close the partnership; it was purchased by Browne for £9,400. The lease period was extended by five years in 1893 but by March 1895, thanks to the totalizator, the Club was able to own the racecourse in fee simple.

Wigley served as starter for the S.A.J.C. many times, though distrusted by some for his dual role as starter and owner. From 1914 to 1925 he served as stipendiary steward.

He died at his home at Partridge Street, Glenelg, after a long illness. His remains were interred at the North Road Cemetery.

== Other interests ==
In 1898 he was appointed to the board of management of the Adelaide Hospital.

== Family ==
For a more extensive overview of the family see William Wigley#Family

- James Francis Wigley (died 1884), prominent businessman, was married to Robina Wigley (died 1909).

- William Henry Wigley (? – 13 October 1924), married to Nellie Wigley, lived on Military Road, Largs, was publican and councillor for Largs ward (1890–1891, 1893–1895) in the Semaphore Council.
- eldest daughter Laura Robina Wigley ( – 26 June 1932) married Ben Henry Beaven ( – 31 July 1923) on 6 June 1883.
- Thomas Francis Wigley (c. 1854 – 14 January 1933) married Lilian Sturt Richardson (1867– ) on 9 October 1890. Lilian's mother was a daughter of Hon. John Crozier.

Lilian had a home of her own in South Yarra, Melbourne where she lived with their son "Mac" while he was studying medicine at the University of Melbourne. In 1915 he received a commission with the Royal Army in France, and they both left for London.
- Dr John Edwin Mackonochie "Mac" Wigley (1 January 1892 – ), born in Abinger, Surrey, grew up in Adelaide, with his mother left Melbourne where he had graduated in medicine, to take up a commission with the Royal Army, eventually becoming an eminent Harley Street dermatologist. He married Eve Barnard in London in June 1935.

- Robert S. Wigley (1864 – 20 April 1926) of Wirra Wirra winery, McLaren Vale.
