= John Bristow Hughes =

Australian politician

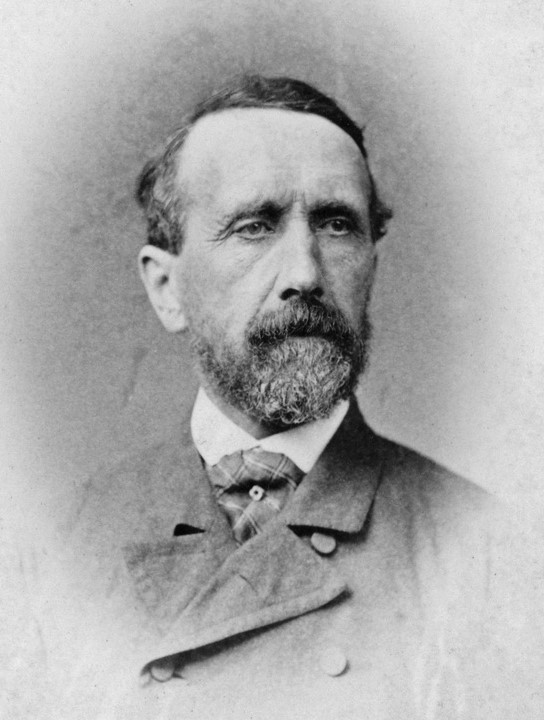
- Born: July 1817; Kentish Town, London, England
- Died: 25 March 1881; Hobson's Bay, Victoria, Australia
- Occupation(s): Grazier, developer and politician

J. B. Hughes (John Bristow Hughes; July 1817 – 25 March 1881) was a grazier, developer and politician in the early days of the Colony of South Australia.

== Life ==
Born in Kentish Town, London, in July. 1817, he was employed at the age of 13 in the office of a merchant who sent him to Calcutta where his health was badly affected. John and his brother Herbert Bristow Hughes came to South Australia in 1840 by way of Tasmania. By August 1841 he was running a sheep-station on the River Gilbert with between 3,000 and 5,000 sheep. He expanded northwards, then sold his run at a substantial profit. His next venture was into real estate, with housing in Woodville; successful enough to donate land for the Anglican Church. Perhaps he also made a substantial contribution to the building.

He was heavily involved around 1849 in the foundation of St Peter's College, a cause that was close to his heart the rest of his life - the "Letters" page of the South Australian Register frequently bore his missives complaining of mis-management or lack of vision.

He stood successfully in 1855 for the seat of East Torrens in the original Legislative Council (when one-third of members was nominated by the South Australian Company) and he took part in the framing the Constitution, then in 1857 South Australian colonial election stood successfully for the House of Assembly seat of Port Adelaide. He supported Torrens Title and served as Treasurer of South Australia from 1 September to 30 September 1857, and was complimented for his Budget speech. On 24 September 1858 be resigned his seat to visit England, in the hope of a recovery from his chronic health complaints but he did later stand (unsuccessfully) for a seat in the House of Assembly. He supported independence of Church and State, opposed State aid to non-government schools, and was described as "anti-Ritualist".

He spent the years 1860 to 1878 in Victoria farming, but lost his money when pleuro-pneumonia wiped out most of his herd and returned to Adelaide. He had for years suffered from gout and serious recurrent headaches, for which the medical profession could do little. His last few weeks were spent holidaying at Point Lonsdale, a popular resort at the entrance to Port Phillip Bay, in the hope of some respite. On the fatal day he went for a swim and was never seen again, nor was his body ever recovered. He was believed to have suffered a stroke or cramp and was carried out to sea.

== Family ==
On 6 January 1847, at Trinity Church, Adelaide, Hughes married Margaret Bartley ( – 29 June 1881), daughter of solicitor William Bartley. Their children included:

- Walter Bristow Hughes ( – 28 October 1909) founded Booyoolie and Bundaleer Stations, died after gun accident.
- Maria Julia Hughes (23 November 1851 – 12 June 1935) pioneer of Booyoolie and Bundaleer stations
- Margaret Hughes (8 June 1859 – ) born in Liverpool, married William Bell Squires ( – 1895) on 27 April 1893
- John Bristow Hughes (1860 – ) married Edith Mary Mann (c. 1865 – 28 January 1946) in 1892

- Wilfrid John Mann Hughes (30 April 1895 – April 1918) killed in action

- youngest daughter Sarah Eleanora Hughes ( – 24 October 1940) married Cecil Henry Norton ( – ) on 23 December 1897
- William Herbert Hughes (30 May 1868 – )

== See also ==
- List of people who disappeared mysteriously at sea
