= Rodolph Wigley =

- Born: Rodolph Lysaght Wigley; 21 October 1881; Fairlie, New Zealand
- Died: 27 April 1946 (aged 64); Dunedin
- Education: Christ's College
- Occupation: Businessman
- Spouse: Jessie Christie Grant
- Children: Harry Wigley
- Parent(s): Thomas Wigley; Annie Caroline Lysaght
- Relatives: Sophia Augusta Lysaght (aunt); John Lysaght Moore (cousin)

Rodolph Lysaght Wigley (21 October 1881 – 27 April 1946), known as "Wigs" to his friends, was a New Zealand businessman from Fairlie in South Canterbury, and pioneer of the New Zealand tourism industry. He founded the Mount Cook Group of tourism and transport companies, which were taken over by his son Harry Wigley. He was a son of Annie Caroline Lysaght and Thomas Wigley, MLC and sheep-farmer. His mothers sister was the artist Sophia Augusta Lysaght.

His first business in 1904 was "Wigley and Thornton" which transported wool from South Canterbury sheep stations to Timaru using steam traction engines. In 1906 he purchased a 6 hp De Dion car and drove it to The Hermitage hotel near Mount Cook; and subsequently dissolved his first firm and formed the "Mount Cook Motor Co Ltd" with four Darraq cars to provide transport for tourists to The Hermitage and from 1912 Queenstown also. When the Lakes County Council tried to stop motor cars on the Queenstown route by banning any vehicle propelled by its own power from a critical two mile stretch, he hired men with horses to pull the cars with passengers over the section. After the Great War he purchased five war surplus British aircraft and formed "The New Zealand Aero Transport Co" in 1921, the precursor to Mount Cook Airline.

He was also a notable mountaineer, making the first mid-winter ascent of Mount Cook with two guides, on 11–12 August 1923.

He formed the Tongariro Tourist Company to build the Chateau Tongariro which was opened in 1929.

In 1999, Wigley was posthumously inducted into the New Zealand Business Hall of Fame.
