= Billy Simpson (footballer, born 1878) =

English footballer

Personal information
- Full name: William Simpson
- Date of birth: 1878
- Place of birth: Sunderland, England
- Date of death: 1962 (aged 83–84)
- Positions: Left back; centre half

Senior career*
Years	Team	Apps	(Gls)
–	Selbourne		
1898–1902	Sunderland	3	(1)
1902–1908	Lincoln City	140	(0)
- * Club domestic league appearances and goals

William Simpson (1878–1962) was an English professional footballer who made 143 appearances in the Football League playing for Sunderland and Lincoln City. He played as a left back or centre half.

== Life and career ==
Simpson was born in Sunderland, which was then in County Durham, and played football for Wearside League club Selbourne before beginning his professional career with Sunderland A.F.C. He played only three times in the First Division, all in the 1898–99 season, and scored once, the winning goal five minutes from time as Sunderland won 2–1 at Bury. He remained with the club until 1902, when he moved to Second Division club Lincoln City. He spent six seasons with Lincoln, making 151 appearances in senior competition, without scoring.

Simpson died in 1962.
