= Thomas Wigley (runholder) =

New Zealand politician

Thomas Henry Wigley (1825 – 17 June 1895) was a runholder in New Zealand. Born in England, he came to New Zealand via Australia in 1860. He was a member of the Nelson Provincial Council (1867–1869) and the New Zealand Legislative Council (1870–1891).

== Biography ==
Wigley was born in England in 1825, the son of Henry Rodolph Wigley (1794–1876). His father was the first magistrate in South Australia, where T. H. Wigley arrived on the Schah aged 13 years. He had received his education at Christ's Hospital. William Wigley (c. 1826–1890) MHA was a brother. After farming on the Murray River, he came to New Zealand in 1860. At first, he farmed Balmoral Station in North Canterbury. From 7 February 1867 to 22 September 1869, he represented the Amuri electorate in the Nelson Provincial Council. He was a member of the New Zealand Legislative Council from 13 May 1870 to 11 June 1891, when he was disqualified for absence.

Wigley sold Balmoral and soon after, in 1871, he became a third-owner in the Kakahu and Opuha Gorge Station inland from Temuka in South Canterbury. Other partners in this venture were brothers John and Michael Studholme, and F. Banks. The 1889 land reforms initiated by the government resulted in them losing their leasehold land, and the partners split up their freehold land in 1890, with Wigley keeping Opuha Gorge.

== Family ==
On 17 February 1863, Wigley married Mary Moorhouse at the Church of St Michael and All Angels in Christchurch. She was the daughter of William Moorhouse of Yorkshire, and William Sefton Moorhouse thus became Wigley's brother-in-law. Wigley's wife died on 18 May 1874. He then married Annie Caroline Lysaght of Wellington on 5 November 1879. Their son, Rodolph Wigley, was the founder of the Mount Cook Group of transport and tourism companies. Sir Harry Wigley was their grandson. Wigley came to Christchurch in June 1895 for medical attention. He died a fortnight later in Christchurch on 17 June 1895.
