= Charles Brown Fisher =

Australian pioneer pastoralist and livestock breeder

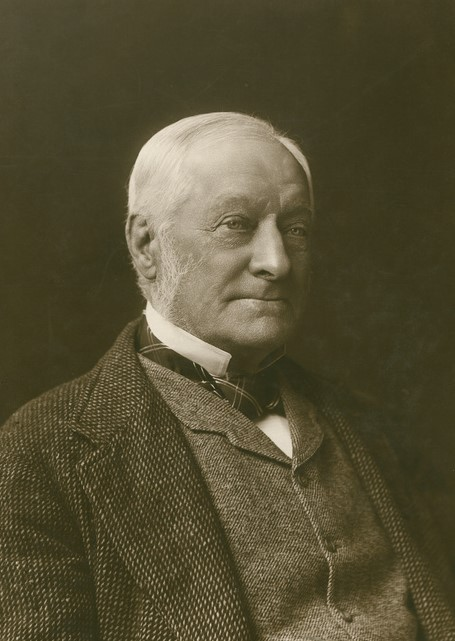

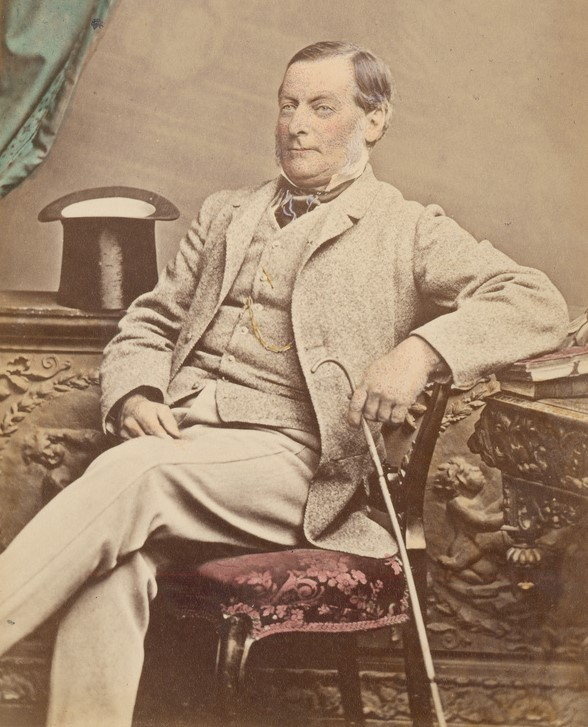

Charles Brown Fisher (25 September 1817 – 6 May 1908), generally referred to as C. B. Fisher, was an Australian pioneer pastoralist and livestock breeder.

== History ==
Born in London, he was the eldest son of (later Sir) James Hurtle Fisher and his wife Elizabeth. At around age twenty he spent two years on an uncle's farm at Little Bowden, Northamptonshire, before migrating to South Australia in 1836 with his parents in HMS Buffalo.

Early in 1838 his brother James, in partnership with Fred Handcock, bought some sheep and established a squatting station (Fisher and Handcock's Station) near the Little Para River. C.B. Fisher assisted his brother, droving ten of the first lambs bred there on foot to Adelaide for delivery to a Mr. Crispe.

In the early 1840s he purchased Section 145 near The Reedbeds, which he named "Lockleys", largely congruent with the present suburb.

He began by dealing in cattle in 1851, which proved to be the most lucrative business he could have chosen, as it was just before the Victorian gold rush (within 3 years the price of a fat bullock rose from £2 10/ to £15 or £17). He purchased drafts of cattle wherever he could buy them up, and drove them across to Victoria, where the diggers bought them up at high prices. He was an excellent horseman, and spent most of his time in the saddle at this period, being obliged to make many long and rapid journeys to keep up the supply of stock. He extended his operations to supplying the Adelaide market and droving mobs of cattle and sheep into Victoria, in some of the largest droving operations in the history of either State.

In 1854 he bought Bundaleer station from J. B. Hughes and the following year acquired Hill River station from William Robinson. Some 10 or 12 South Australian estates passed through his hands, including Wirrabara, Mount Schank, and Moorak near Port Gawler. In the Mount Schank station he was in partnership with Benjamin Rochfort, who, with Charles's brother Hurtle, survived the wreck of the Admella, which claimed the life of Charles's brother George.

In 1865 he went to Melbourne, and lived in Victoria for upwards of 40 years, becoming the largest pastoralist in Australia. Among his properties were Yanga in New South Wales and Ned's Corner in Victoria, Darling Downs in Queensland, Thurulgoona, Fort Constantine and Warrnambool Downs in the north and many smaller properties, as well as some in the western district of Victoria. In the Northern Territory he took up large areas, including Glencoe Station and Victoria Downs, one of the best cattle stations in Australia. He sent 30,000 cattle to these properties in the early eighties.

=== Sheep ===
Fisher specialised in Merino sheep of the large-framed, plain-bodied, heavily covered type for many years known in Australia as the Fisher Merino. Quantity, rather than fineness, was his ideal, and price per sheep against price per lb. of wool. He also imported many Longwool sheep, and attained prominence as a breeder of Lincolns, to which he gave preference, though for fattening he held that the English Leicester was superior. By judicious imports, he did much to improve Australian livestock.

=== Cattle ===
He was a great lover Shorthorn cattle, of which he was a splendid judge, and imported some grand animals, breeding a magnificent herd, the disposal of which realised very high prices at Maribyrnong. He would only buy of the best, either of stock or country.

=== Horses ===
Fisher, in his earlier life, was one of the most prominent sportsmen in Australia, and with his brother, Hurtle Fisher, introduced some of the best blood stock ever brought to Australia, including the celebrated stallion Fisherman. The Clydesdale and Suffolk Punch blood stock he held at Buckland Park were amongst the finest in the world.

== Failure and death ==
In the early nineties he fell on hard times, in company with many other station-holders throughout Australia. The North Australian Territory Company, which he had floated (secretly in partnership with Goldsbrough Mort & Co.) failed.

His finances steadily worsened and although insolvent, he continued trading until, with debts of nearly £1.5million, he was forced to declare himself bankrupt.

Fisher died at his residence, Seafield Towers, Albert Terrace, Glenelg, only seven or eight months after returning to Adelaide. He was remembered as having a kindly, genial nature, strong, self-reliant, and large-hearted. He was always courageous and hopeful, even optimistic. Perhaps unique among wealthy pastoralists and speculators of the time, he never once left the shores of Australia.
