= Harry Wigley =

New Zealand businessman (1913–1980)

Sir Harry Wigley KBE
- Born: Henry Rodolph Wigley; 2 February 1913; Fairlie, New Zealand
- Died: 15 September 1980 (aged 67); Christchurch, New Zealand
- Education: Timaru Boys' High School; Christ's College, Christchurch
- Occupation: Businessman
- Spouse: Isabella Jessie Allport
- Children: 5
- Parent(s): Jessie Christie Grant; Rodolph Wigley

Sir Henry Rodolph Wigley KBE (2 February 1913 – 15 September 1980) was a pilot, entrepreneur, and pioneer of the New Zealand tourism industry.

Wigley was born at Fairlie in 1913. In the 1930s, Wigley entered the family firm, the Mount Cook Tourist Company of New Zealand which his father Rodolph Wigley had founded, but he had begun pilot training while in his teens, and at the outbreak of World War II joined the Royal New Zealand Air Force, first as a flying instructor, then as a fighter pilot in the Pacific — leaving with the rank of wing commander

Wigley had been captain of the New Zealand ski team in 1936–37, and after the war led his company in establishing new ski-fields and facilities at Coronet Peak and Lake Ōhau.

In the early 1950s, Wigley also encouraged the company to involve itself in the aerial topdressing businesses, and on 22 September 1955 he successfully landed on the snowfield of the Tasman Glacier with an Auster Aiglet aircraft fitted with retractable wooden skis of his own design. After that flight, which was reputed to be the first of its kind in the southern hemisphere, ski-plane trips to Tasman Glacier became a key part of the Mt Cook tourism.

On 11 January 1946, Wigley was appointed an Officer of the Order of the British Empire (Miliatary Division), in recognition of conspicuous service in operations against the Japanese. In the 1969 Queen's Birthday Honours, Wigley was appointed a Commander of the Order of the British Empire (Civil Division), for services to the tourist industry. His appointment was elevated to Knight Commander in the 1976 New Year Honours, for services to the tourist, travel and aviation industries.

Wigley died of a heart attack on a golf course in Christchurch on 15 September 1980.

== See also ==
- Bill Hamilton (engineer)
