= C. Leslie Macdonald =

Australian racehorse owner

Charles Leslie Macdonald (21 December 1856 – 16 November 1929) was an Australian racehorse owner and breeder, noted for two Melbourne Cup winners, Revenue in 1901 and Night Watch in 1918.

== Life and career ==
Charles Leslie Macdonald was born in on 21 December 1856, in Bunglegumbie, New South Wales, near Dubbo, the son of Charles Edward Stuart MacDonald (c. 1824 – 29 December 1862), wine merchant, Dubbo, later stock and station agent of Mort Street, Sydney, and his wife Janet Macdonald.

His elder sister Isabella Sarah Charlotte Macdonald (23 October 1854 – ) married J. E. Savill (c. 1847–1920) in Adelaide on 4 September 1872; by 1874 Macdonald was also in Adelaide. At that time Savill was working as a graphic artist and Macdonald was starting in business as a racehorse owner, with a chestnut gelding Gladiator (late Red Deer), which won the Lockleys Cup in August 1874. This was an amateur race held on E. M. Bagot and G. Bennett's property at Lockleys. In 1878 at a similar meeting, his horse Firefly won the Hurdle Race. In April 1879 he purchased the Adelaide Cup winner Banter. At what may have been his first professional race at Simeon Barnard's Newmarket meeting at Morphettville in August 1879, his bay colt Pawnbroker came second in the Handicap Flutter and won the South Australian Derby in 1879. He won the Birthday Cup in 1880 with Banter.

Macdonald was working closely with Savill, at his Lockleys stables, preparing horses for owners such as W. R. Wilson. Savill won the South Australian Derby with Pawnbroker in 1879 and the Adelaide Racing Club's first two City Handicaps with Miss Harriet in 1879 and Footstep in 1880. Savill was owner of The Assyrian unexpectedly who won the 1882 Melbourne Cup, and only because a last-minute shower of rain made the track "heavy", which suited The Assyrian admirably. The large sum of money Savill had put on the mare (and in a panic had tried in vain to hedge) made him wealthy enough to return to England and live in grand style. Macdonald took over operation of the Lockleys stables, and had some success with horses Rory O'More, The Israelite, and Footstep. He leased Hortense from Sir Thomas Elder and raced her with some success. Macdonald had sole management of Tom Barnfield's First Water, a horse previously owned by William Pile. They got him ready for the 1883 Melbourne Cup, and Barnfield, confident of victory at good odds, backed him heavily but lost £80,000 when Martini-Henry won the Cup. Macdonald took over the training of Lord Wilton for E. W. Ellis (later chairman of the V.R.C. stipendiary stewards) after that horse had won the 1885 Adelaide Cup, famously was run at Flemington.

St Albans

St. Albans stud and racing stables in Breakwater, near Geelong was founded in 1872 by trainer James Wilson, and the homestead was completed the following year. In 1886 St Albans was purchased by John Crozier, who sold it to mining magnate W. R. Wilson four years later for a reputed £75,000. Wilson appointed Macdonald manager of the stud.

Wilson broke up his St. Albans establishment in 1895, selling the stock and property on the art union principle. At a separate sale Macdonald purchased Revenue for 725 guineas, and backed him heavily for the 1901 Melbourne Cup, despite his starting at 7 to 4, the hottest favourite in the history of the race up to that time. His other great purchase was Wakeful, regarded by many as the greatest mare that ever raced in Australia, having won the Sydney Cup, Oakleigh Plate, Newmarket Handicap, and Doncaster Handicap. Among Wakeful's offspring were Blairgour and Night Watch, winners of several important races. Macdonald's trainer for a number of years was Hugh "Hughie" Munro (c. 1858 – 2 June 1925), father of Sydney jockeys Jimmie Munro (1906–1974) and Darby Munro (1913–1966).

The St Albans Estate property, valued at £40,000, was won by J. W. Jordan, of Seymour, Victoria, who offered it for sale at a great auction in November, and was knocked down to W. R. Wilson, who bought the property back for £24,000. He also bought back some of his horses at "sensible" prices from "lucky winners", who no doubt found ownership of a thoroughbred horse a "white elephant" proposition. With this nucleus, Wilson re-established the stud and racing stables, retaining Macdonald as manager.

Wilson died in 1900 and the St Alban stud was broken up again. The great sire Bill of Portland was purchased by an English stud. The property was purchased by a consortium which included Guy Raymond, a friend of Macdonald's.

During the time Macdonald was at St Albans, many great horses, including Auriferous, Aurum, Bobadil, Carnage, Elusive, La Carabine, La Tosca, Merman, Scorn, Strathmore, Symmetry, and Wallace passed through his hands, and within that ten years they won the Maribyrnong Plate, Debutant Stakes, Oakleigh Plate, and Adelaide Birthday Cup each once, Caulfield Futurity Stakes, Oaks, VRC Sires' Produce Stakes, AJC St Leger, Sydney Cup, and Australian Cup twice, Victoria Derby, VRC St Leger, Ascot Vale Stakes, Caulfield Guineas, Williamstown, and Champagne Stakes three times each. Aurum, who came a good third in the Melbourne Cup of 1897 despite a punishing weight of 8 st 6 lb (54 kg), Macdonald considered the best three-year-old he had seen in Australia. The famous actress Lily Langtry, who had purchased the St Albans horse Merman and raced him successfully in England, purchased and imported Aurum but he broke down and never raced in England.

Independent again

The breakup of St Albans marked the beginning of the most profitable period of Macdonald's racing career. He purchased at the sale ring a handful of horses from Wilson's estate with an eye to their racing potential rather than for breeding. He purchased a home at Caulfield, adjoining the racecourse, and there he trained for a number of years.

His first purchase was the four-year-old Trenton mare Wakeful, who had been tried as a two-year-old, but given a long rest after becoming shin sore. Macdonald got her for 310 guineas, which turned out one of the greatest bargains in Australian racing history. Races she won for Macdonald included the Oakleigh Plate, Newmarket Handicap, Doncaster Handicap and Sydney Cup, for a total of £16,690 in prize money and through judicious punting, a fortune from the bookmakers. She was narrowly beaten by Hymettus in the 1901 Caulfield Cup and Lord Cardigan in the 1903 Melbourne Cup, carrying 10 stone (64 kg).

Revenue, a son of Trenton, was another of his St Albans purchases, which cost him 725 guineas. This horse took out the 1901 Melbourne Cup and also made a great deal of money for Macdonald, despite starting at 7 to 4, at that time the hottest favourite in the history of the Cup. He did not fare so well in the 1902 Australian Cup though, being crippled in the race, for which Macdonald blamed foul riding by Walter Burn, rider of Flintlock. Macdonald had won and lost two fortunes during his long involvement with horseracing and was determined the bookmakers should not have his third, so put it into gilt-edged securities, and thereby lived the rest of his life in comfort and financial security. Others of his horses had significant wins: Kinglike won the 1900 Caulfield Guineas, and Aurous won the 1901 Caulfield Futurity Stakes.

Following a visit to England and the death of Isaac Earnshaw, Macdonald began in 1914 acting as racing manager for "The Firm" of sharebrokers and horse owners Clark & Robinson, whose principals, William Clark and Lionel Robinson, were old friends before settling in England. Macdonald left their employ in 1917, and the agency was taken over by S. Bloomfield.

Macdonald had retired Wakeful to a stud in New South Wales, where she produced a number of foals, and he dropped out of racehorse ownership until those sons and daughters of Wakeful were ready to race. Balgowan made little impact, but Blairgour won both the Oakleigh Plate and Caulfield Futurity Stakes for him in 1911, and sold for a good price, but became a windsucker and had to be put out to pasture. Night Watch, son of Wakeful, was initially trained by Charles Quinn and W. Kelso, then by Richard Bradfield, who was also training the Clark & Robinson horses. Night Watch won the 1918 Melbourne Cup, was second in the Caulfield Cup, and won several other good races.

Macdonald retired from racing after Night Watch's 1918 victory.

== Death ==
In 1927, Macdonald sold his stud horses, all descendants of Wakeful.

Macdonald had been in poor health for a long time, and shot himself in the head with a revolver. He was found lying unconscious in his flat at Cliveden Mansions, East Melbourne. He died some hours later in a private hospital on 16 November 1929, aged 72 years, and was buried at the Brighton General Cemetery.

Macdonald was described as a charming man, and one of the most able trainers and astute judges of horses Australia has known. During his last year or two he was frequently in the company of Guy Raymond, one of the owners of St. Albans, so his connection with that stable remained strong until Maddonald's death.

== Family ==
Macdonald married Alice Maude Keane Massina (1865 – 14 May 1940) on 1 September 1902. They had no children.

A sister, Isabella Sarah Charlotte Macdonald (23 October 1854 – ) married J. Eden Savill, and had several children.
