= Simeon Barnard =

Australian horse racing official

Simeon Barnard (c. December 1844 – 17 November 1924) was a horse racing official in South Australia, one of the founders of the South Australian Jockey Club and its secretary from 1874 to 1884, and acted in an honorary capacity for four years while the Club was in recess.

== History ==
Barnard was born at Portsmouth in February. 1844, and at the age of 17 was brought to South Australia with his parents. He was educated at St. Peter's College, and afterwards became one of Adelaide's leading auctioneers. He was a partner in the accountancy firm of Barnard & Chambers.

=== S.A.J.C. ===
When Barnard succeeded C. J. Coates as secretary of the South Australian Jockey Club in 1874 he found the club heavily in debt to the English, Scottish, and Australian Bank. W. B. Rounsevell, William Pile, Sir Richard Chaffey Baker, John Crozier, and Barnard elected to pay off the overdraft. In February 1874 Thomas Elder offered about 160 acres (65 ha) of land on the Glenelg line of railway, near the Morphett Arms Hotel, as a racetrack. The task of forming a company to administer the property fell to Barnard. To this end, the South Australian Jockey Club Company (Limited), a non-profit company was formed by a small group of men in March 1874 with a capital value of £1000, and Barnard was appointed its hon. secretary. The directors elected at the first general meeting of the Company were Sir Henry Ayers, Sir John Morphett, Thomas Elder, John Crozier, R. C. Baker, Philip Levi, Joseph Gilbert, E. W. Pitts, and H. B. Hughes, all highly influential gentlemen and racing enthusiasts. The Company promptly spent the money subscribed on establishing essential racing facilities on the Morphettville property. The course was laid out by R. C. Bagot, first secretary of the Victoria Racing Club. The course was partly walled in, a ladies' lawn laid, and a grand stand, judge's box, stewards' stand, telegraph office, loose boxes erected.

The South Australian Jockey Club leased the property from the Company for one year, with a right of renewal from year to year for five years at a rental of 6 per cent. on the outlay, which seemed to the Club a very good deal. The sum of £1,000 was found to be inadequate and the Company decided to increase the capital to £7,000. The Company then sought from Sir Thomas Elder, and received, conversion of the peppercorn rental to freehold purchase of the Morphettville land so they had the ability to borrow against the value of the land.

The first race meeting at Morphettville was held on 23 September 1875. Barnard and R. C. Baker introduced a totalizator, which was conducted on a large sheet of cardboard in the secretary's office, the amounts invested being posted opposite the names of the horses. In 1881 the horse D.O.D. (previously Alarm), belonging to and named for Dan O'Dea, won the Goodwood Handicap, and paid the sensational dividend of £836/16s, as only one person, one William Smith of Willaston, had backed the horse. By the nature of a totalizator, he would have made the same profit whether he had placed £1 or £100, but this was not accepted by the crowd, who thought the Club was acting unfairly and put the blame on Barnard. Shortly after that incident the Woolford totalizator (for Adelaide inventor Robert Woolford) was installed. It worked admirably until 1921, when it was replaced, and whose only drawback was that it did not show the grand total invested for each race. Another make of totalizator, from Hill & Schinnerling of Melbourne, had been trialled in 1879.

The Club continued to lease the course, and to conduct meetings, but did not prosper as expected, largely due to competition from the Adelaide Racing Club. In 1884 the totalizator, which had been given exemption from aspects of the Gaming Act, became illegal again, and operation of the Club was no longer viable, and in desperation the Adelaide Cup meeting was in 1885 run at Flemington. This coincided with the severe South Australian drought of 1884–1886 and a consequent financial downturn. The S.A.J.C went into recess and held no meetings for four years.

In December 1884 the South Australian Jockey Club Company (Limited) was voluntarily wound up, with Barnard appointed liquidator, and carried out the secretarial duties of the S.A.J.C. in an honorary capacity. Morphettville racecourse was placed in the hands of the Queensland Mortgage Company, and fell into a state of disrepair. The property was then purchased for £8,000 by Thomas. F. Wigley, R. B. Pell, and Sylvester Browne. Browne subsequently purchased Pell's interest and in July 1889 Wigley and Browne placed the racecourse on the market in order to close the partnership; it was purchased by Browne.

The Club was re-formed in 1888 with A. O. Whitington elected secretary. Racing by the S.A.J.C. was revived at Morphettville in 1889 after the right to use the totalizator had been granted by Parliament. Browne leased the course to the S.A.J.C. until 1895 when the freehold was acquired by Sir R. C. Baker, W. B. Rounsevell, William Pile, H. Chambers, P. F. Bonnin, Fred Ayers (son of Henry Ayers), and J. A. Ellery, who constituted the S.A.J.C. committee, so at last the course was the property of the S.A.J.C.

=== Newmarket races ===
Barnard leased the Morphettville course in 1879 to run a series of race meetings as a private venture which he termed "Newmarket Races" following the popularity of the V.R.C's "Newmarket Handicaps". The races were run under S.A.J.C. rules, and employed for the most part S.A.J.C. officials, but for his own benefit. The dates of his meetings were 22 February, 26 April, 20 June, 6 September, 18 October (deferred from 11 October and poorly attended), and the Christmas Newmarket of 27 December.

History was created after the Christmas Cup when J. Eden Savill verbally abused steward John Crozier after his horse was disqualified. Savill had apologised, but refused Barnard's demand that he publicly admit to "unsportsmanlike and ungentlemanly conduct". In a series of events strongly reminiscent of the 1889 Seth Ferry — Tattersalls confrontation, the club committee convened a special meeting at which Savill was not present, and imposed on him a twelve months' ban from the course. Savill engaged several Q.C.s to sue certain members of that committee for penalising him without allowing him the opportunity to confront his accusers and defend himself. Savill won and was awarded costs, which would have been substantial.

The Newmarket races of 28 February and later were run by the S.A.J.C.

=== His horses ===
Barnard successfully raced several horses, notably Totalizator, which won the Adelaide Cup in 1881, ridden by D. Bowes and trained by John Hill (who had also prepared the second and third place winners).

Barnard considered that The Broker was the best horse he ever owned, and he won several good races with him.

He was for a time owner of The Assyrian, but sold him, only to see him subsequently win the 1882 Melbourne Cup.

== Final days ==
Barnard enjoyed excellent health throughout his life, only succumbing to illness six weeks before he died at his home "Garthowen" on Fisher-street, Malvern.

== Family ==
Simeon Barnard married Jannetta Lee ( –1903) on 19 January 1870, in a Jewish wedding.

- Herbert George Barnard (29 November 1870 – 25 September 1935) married Emma Ruth Jones ( –1956) in 1907, lived in Unley. He owned several good horses, notably Supervalve.
- Philip Leon Barnard (4 April 1872 – 1 August 1951) married Evelyn Fitzpatrick on 28 May 1907, moved to Sydney
- Marie Louise Barnard (26 September 1873 – 3 March 1926) married William Walter Waldie in 1906, lived in Adelaide
- Elizabeth Sarah "Beth" "Lizzie" Barnard (13 April 1875 – 2 January 1943) married J(udah) Moss Solomon BA LLB (12 April 1869 – 30 March 1949) on 24 June 1896, and solicitor of King William Street, Adelaide from 1893 to 1901. They moved to Subiaco around 1907; he was struck off legal rolls for dishonest conduct. Confusion of his name with that of Judah Moss Solomon BA LLB (1857–1925) led to hostility and latter renaming himself Solomon-Senior.
- Louis Montefiore Barnard (13 March 1877 – 18 August 1954) moved to Perth, married Eleanor Olive Murray on 17 October 1911
- Pte Sydney Harry Barnard (19 October 1879 – 3 May 1918), was killed in the war in France.
- Stella Barnard (26 September 1885 – 1944) lived in Malvern
- Lancelot Lee Barnard (31 May 1889 – 1957) married Gillian Hope Moyse ( –1969) in 1923, lived in Adelaide. He was convicted and jailed for theft while working as an auctioneer.
