= Tasmanian Derby =

Horse race in Tasmania, Australia

- Class: Listed
- Location: Elwick Racecourse; Glenorchy, Australia
- Inaugurated: 1915
- Race type: Thoroughbred - Flat racing
- Sponsor: Graham Family Funerals (2025)
- Website: http://www.tsrc.com.au

Race information
- Distance: 2200 metres (1.367 miles)
- Surface: Turf
- Track: Left-handed
- Qualification: Three-year-olds
- Weight: Set weights
- Purse: A$150,000 (2025)

The Tasmanian Derby is a Listed Thoroughbred horse race for three-year-olds at set weights over a distance of 2200 metres at Elwick Racecourse in Glenorchy, Australia, in February.

== History ==
- 2012 the race was down graded to a Listed race.

== Winners ==
The following are past winners of the race.

- 2026 - Dad and Dave
- 2025 - Likeakalix
- 2024 – Bold Soul
- 2023 – Dunkel
- 2022 – The Nephew
- 2021 – Explosive Jack
- 2020 – Vamos Raffa
- 2019 – Cossetot
- 2018 – Civil Disobedience
- 2017 – Northwest Passage
- 2016 – Jerilderie Letter
- 2015 – Geegees Classicboy
- 2014 – Liberty Leader
- 2013 – Ollie's Gold
- 2012 – Methuselah
- 2011 – Mourinho
- 2010 – Geegees Blackflash
- 2009 – Betwixt
- 2008 – Mega Boss
- 2007 – Currigee
- 2006 – Esterel
- 2005 – Phantom Thief
- 2004 – Almost Never
- 2003 – Dream Quest
- 2002 – Moonah Brooke
- 2001 – Party Boy
- 2000 – Father Floyd
- 1999 – Star Of Nime
- 1998 – Suavity
- 1997 – Ventura
- 1996 – Devon Sun
- 1995 – Napier Street
- 1994 – Ashley Grove
- 1993 – Pax-A-Million
- 1992 – Charleston Party
- 1991 – My Latin Boy
- 1990 – King Of Belmont
- 1989 – Bar Landy
- 1988 – Firetap
- 1987 – How's Sovereign
- 1986 – Pavista
- 1985 – Royal Work
- 1984 – So Brikay
- 1983 – Mr Jazz
- 1982 – Palomine
- 1981 – Pass The Baton
- 1980 – Godsend

== See also ==
- Hobart Cup
- Mystic Journey Stakes
- List of Australian Group races
- Group races
