= Merman (horse) =

Australian Thoroughbred racehorse

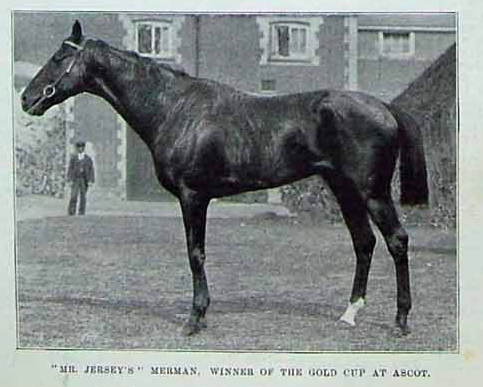
- Merman, 1900 Gold Cup winner.
- Sire: Grand Flaneur (AUS)
- Grandsire: Yattendon (AUS)
- Dam: Seaweed (AUS)
- Damsire: Coltness (GB)
- Sex: Stallion
- Foaled: 1892
- Country: Australia
- Colour: Chestnut
- Breeder: Hobartville Stud
- Owner: W. R. Wilson (Australia); Lillie Langtry (Mr. Jersey) (England)
- Trainer: C. L. Macdonald (Australia); W.'Jack' Robinson / Frank Webb ((England))
- Record: 45:15-4-3
- Earnings: £3,360

Major wins
- Williamstown Cup (1896); Lewes Handicap (1897); Cesarewitch Stakes (1897); Jockey Club Cup (1898); Goodwood Plate (1899); Goodwood Cup (1899); Birmingham Handicap (1899); Ascot Gold Cup (1900)

Honours
- Australian Racing Hall of Fame (2016)
- Last updated on 28 May 2017

Merman (foaled in Australia) (1892–1914) was a Thoroughbred racehorse, one of the finest racehorses in Colonial Australian racing history that raced in Europe. He won at distances from 5 furlongs (1,000 metres) to 2 1/2 miles (4,000 metres). In 2016 Merman was inducted to the Australian Racing Hall of Fame.

== Breeding ==
Merman was a chestnut colt foaled in 1892 at Hobartville Stud, in Richmond, New South Wales. Early in his career he was owned by W. R. Wilson. Merman's sire was 1880 Melbourne Cup winner Grand Flaneur who was Leading sire in Australia in 1895.

== Racing career ==
=== Two year old (1894–1895) ===
Merman began his career in February 1895 in a 6 furlong race unsuccessfully at Geelong Racecourse. However, he improved and on his third start on 9 March 1895 at Flemington Racecourse he won the VRC Unplaced Two Year Old Stakes over a distance of 6 furlongs at the long odds of 10/1 in a time of 1:17 1/2. In his following start two weeks later in the 5 furlongs VRC Hope Stakes, Mermen finished third at 7/1 beaten by a length by The Parisienne.
After a six-week break Merman was taken to South Australia and on 11 May 1895, the third day of the South Australian Jockey Club Autumn meeting at Morphettville Racecourse won the 5 furlongs Juvenile Handicap beating nine other entrants. Two weeks later Merman ran at the Old Course (renamed to Victoria Park Racecourse in 1897) in the Adelaide Stakes over 6 furlongs but was soundly defeated finishing fifth as topweight and favourite by Gehenna. In his last race of the season Merman challenged older horses in the 5 furlongs Adelaide Racing Club Rose Park Handicap at the Old Course and was beaten by the lightweight First Bolt by three lengths into second place.

=== Three year old (1895–1896) ===
In the spring of 1895 Merman had 4 starts and performed poorly. In the autumn after a fifth placing in the VRC Brunswick Stakes at Flemington the horse was taken to New South Wales and raced Randwick Racecourse in the AJC Flying Handicap and was once again unplaced. Considered as somewhat of a failure the horse surprised when winning the VRC July Handicap at Flemington on Grand National Steeplechase Day. At his last start as a three-year-old, Merman finished fourth in the VATC Kambrook Handicap at Caulfield Racecourse.

=== Four year old (1896–1897) ===
Merman continued improving with a third-place finish in the VRC August Handicap and on 5 September 1896 starting as the 4/1 favourite won the VATC Armadale Handicap at Caulfield comfortably by a couple of lengths. Three races later at the same meeting Merman backed up and ran in the sprint Rosstown Handicap over 5 1/4 furlongs and won with a furious finish by a length.
Owner W. R. Wilson then entered Merman as part of a three horse entry with Nada and Resolute for the prestigious Caulfield Cup. Merman ran well for his first time at the 1 1/2 miles distance finishing fourth to the aged winner Cremorne. On Victoria Derby Day Merman ran in the VRC Coburg Stakes and finished fourth as the 4/1 favourite beaten by his nemesis at the time, Ayrshire. Three days later Merman was victorious in the VRC Yan Yean Stakes over 1 mile winning by 1/2 head as the 7/1 equal second favourite. On 9 November 1895 Merman defeated his stablemate Trentham in the Williamstown Cup over a distance of 1 3/8 miles. This would be Merman's last appearance in Australia on the track.

=== Change of ownership ===
Merman's owner W. R. Wilson had made contacts, one of which was the bookmaker Joe Thompson, who at this time was in England. Wilson sent a cable to William Allison offering to sell Merman. Thompson was a mentor to the horse owner and actress Lillie Langtry and after seeing the cable from Wilson she agreed to purchase the stallion through William Allison as an agent, for 1,600 guineas. Merman left Australia on the streamer Aberdeen on 3 December 1896 from Melbourne. Merman arrived in England in February 1897. Women were excluded from registering horses at this time so the horse was registered under the pseudonym Mr. Jersey.

=== Five year old (1897) ===
After a brief spell to recover from the journey at Allison's Cobham Stud in Surrey, he was delivered to trainer Fred Webb in Newmarket. Within two months on 7 April 1897 Merman had his first start in England in the Kingsclere Handicap at Kempton Park finishing fifth as the topweight. His next start on 3 July 1897 was in the Duchess of York Stakes over a mile at Hurst Park. Merman still unsettled delayed the start of the race which affected his performance when he finished seventh in a field of nine to the American bred Diakka. After an improved third at Leicester Racecourse in the handicap Merman won his first race in England at Lewes in the Lewes Handicap (1 1/2 miles) as a lightweight with 6 st. 12 lbs. winning by 1/2 length.
On 13 October 1897 Merman produced one of his finest performances to win the Cesarewitch Stakes at Newmarket. Starting at the odds of 100/7, Merman topped a field of 23 runners in what at that time was a rare international field of American, French and English representatives. The win made owner Mrs. Langtry wealthy as it was noted that she punted to win £40,000. However, elation turned into despair for Mrs. Langtry as her estranged husband committed suicide a couple of days after the event. Merman won again at his next start, a minor long-distance event at Worcester before the end of that season.

=== Six year old (1898) ===
In his first race of the season Merman was defeated into fourth place at Chester Racecourse in the Chester Cup after leading into the straight. In his next start in the Epsom Gold Cup at Epsom Downs Merman faced former Australian horses 1896 VRC Victoria Derby winner Newhaven and 1896 VRC Newmarket Handicap winner Maluma but was not match for winner Bay Ronald finishing fourth. Attempting to repeat the Cesarewitch Stakes victory from a year ago, Merman ran a gallant third to Chaleureux and Herminius. On the second day of the Newmarket Houghton Meeting, Merman was once again beaten into sixth place in the Cambridgeshire Stakes by the former Australian mare Georgic who in 1895 won the AJC All Aged Stakes. Racing on the third day at Newmarket in a row, Merman spectacularly won the Jockey Club Cup over two miles two furlongs and 32 yards defeating rivals The Rush and Bay Ronald. On his last race of the season Merman finished an unflattering last in the November Handicap at New Barns, Manchester to Chaleureux.

=== Seven year old (1899) ===
This year brought about changes. First the horse was moved to a new trainer W. "Jack" Robinson. who trained at Foxhill in Wiltshire. Merman began his season in full earnest on 19 April in the City and Suburban Handicap at Epsom Downs but he failed to fire finishing in 16th to familiar Newhaven. After an unsuccessful run in May in the Princes Handicap at York, Merman was rested and then on 23 July started as the 4/1 favourite in the Liverpool Cup at Manchester Racecourse and finished 5th.
Three days later Merman started at the Glorious Goodwood meeting at Goodwood Racecourse on 26 July in the 2 miles Goodwood Plate and starting 4/1 as the second favourite won the event easily by 4 lengths. On the next day Merman's owner Lily Langtry married Hugo Gerald de Bathe in Jersey and was present to witness her horse capture the prestigious Goodwood Cup over the 2 1/2 miles distance. At his next start on 9 August Merman was victorious in the 1 1/2 mile Birmingham Handicap at Birmingham Racecourse.
Merman's next venture was across the English Channel to France, where on 20 August 1899 at Deauville-La Touques Racecourse he conceded 22 pounds to the three-year-old Fourire and was valiantly beaten in the 2,500 metres Grand Prix de Deauville. Returning to England, Merman next appeared in the 1 1/2 miles October Plate at Kempton Park where he was defeated into second place as the 1/3 odds on favourite by the 4 year old mare St. Ia. Five days later on 10 October 1899 Merman returned to Newmarket and started in the Cesarewitch Stakes for the third time and finished thirteenth to 6/1 lightly weighted favourite Scintillant. In his last start of the year in the Jockey Club Cup it was noted that Merman again had to concede 18 pounds in weight to Mazagan and it seemed that his form was waning and retirement was imminent.

=== Eight year old (1900) ===
Won the Ascot Gold Cup

== Pedigree ==
Pedigree of Merman (AUS) (11-e), Chestnut stallion, 1892
Sire Grand Flaneur (AUS) 1877	Yattendon (AUS); 1861	Sir Hercules (AUS) 1843	Cap-a-Pie (GB) 1837
Sire Grand Flaneur (AUS) 1877	Yattendon (AUS); 1861	Sir Hercules (AUS) 1843	Paraguay* (GB) 1835
Sire Grand Flaneur (AUS) 1877	Yattendon (AUS); 1861	Cassandra (AUS) 1841	Tros (GB) 1836
Sire Grand Flaneur (AUS) 1877	Yattendon (AUS); 1861	Cassandra (AUS) 1841	Alice Grey (AUS) 1833
Sire Grand Flaneur (AUS) 1877	First Lady (GB); 1865	St Albans (GB) 1857	Stockwell (GB)* 1847
Sire Grand Flaneur (AUS) 1877	First Lady (GB); 1865	St Albans (GB) 1857	Bribery (GB) 1851
Sire Grand Flaneur (AUS) 1877	First Lady (GB); 1865	Lady Patroness (GB) 1860	Orlando (GB) 1841
Sire Grand Flaneur (AUS) 1877	First Lady (GB); 1865	Lady Patroness (GB) 1860	Lady Palmerston (GB) 1852
Dam Seaweed (AUS) 1883	Coltness (GB); 1873	King Tom (GB) 1851	Harkaway (IRE) 1834
Dam Seaweed (AUS) 1883	Coltness (GB); 1873	King Tom (GB) 1851	Pocahontas* (GB) 1837
Dam Seaweed (AUS) 1883	Coltness (GB); 1873	Crocus (GB) 1866	Thormanby (GB) 1857
Dam Seaweed (AUS) 1883	Coltness (GB); 1873	Crocus (GB) 1866	Sunflower (GB) 1847
Dam Seaweed (AUS) 1883	Surf (GB); 1878	Lifeboat (GB) 1855	Sir Hercules (IRE)* 1826
Dam Seaweed (AUS) 1883	Surf (GB); 1878	Lifeboat (GB) 1855	Yard Arm (GB) 1843
Dam Seaweed (AUS) 1883	Surf (GB); 1878	Parvenu (GB) 1873	Joskin (GB) 1855
Dam Seaweed (AUS) 1883	Surf (GB); 1878	Parvenu (GB) 1873	Queen Elizabeth (GB) 1859

* Merman is inbred 5S x 7S x 4D to the stallion Sir Hercules (IRE), meaning that he appears fifth generation (via Paraguay) and seventh generation (via Stockwell) on the sire side of his pedigree, and fourth generation on the dam side of his pedigree.

* Merman is inbred 5S x 4D to the mare Pocahontas, meaning that she appears fifth generation (via Stockwell) on the sire side of his pedigree, and fourth generation on the dam side of his pedigree.
