= 1882 Melbourne Cup =

Annual horse race in Melbourne, Victoria

- Melbourne Cup
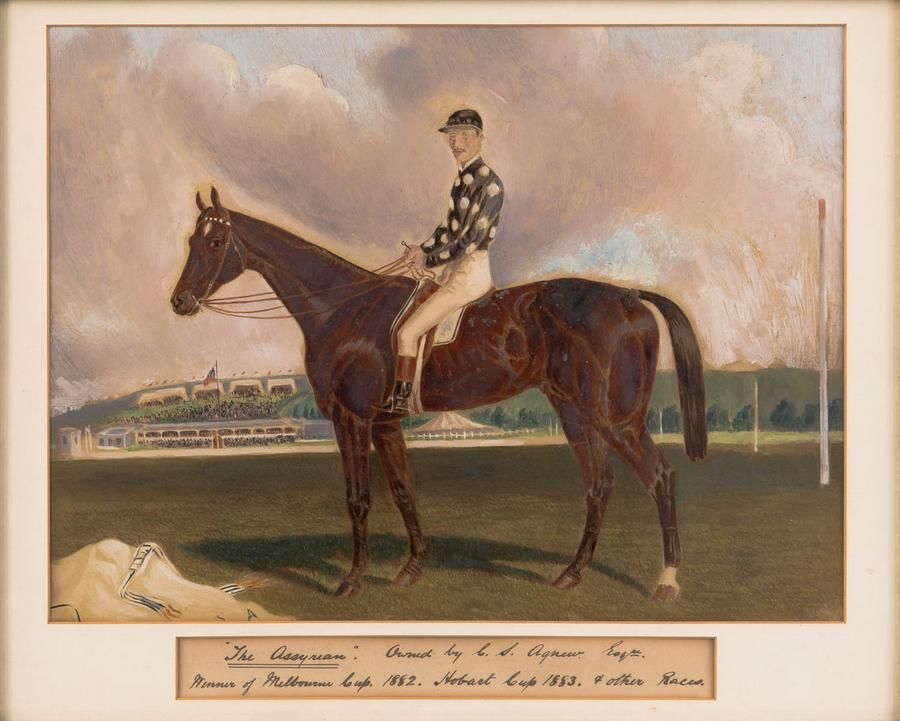
- Painting of The Assyrian by Fred Woodhouse Sr
- Location: Flemington Racecourse
- Date: 31 October 1882
- Distance: 2 miles
- Winning horse: The Assyrian
- Winning time: 3:40.00
- Final odds: 33/1
- Jockey: Charles Hutchins
- Trainer: John Eden Savill
- Owner: John Eden Savill
- Surface: Turf
- Attendance: ≈80,000

The 1882 Melbourne Cup was a two-mile handicap horse race which took place on Tuesday, 31 October 1882.

This year was the twenty-second running of the Melbourne Cup. The race, won by The Assyrian was held during a heavy gale and rain.

== Entries and odds ==
There were 128 nominations for the race, with 25 runners headed for the start following a number of withdrawals. The top weight was given to Darebin, running in its second Melbourne Cup. Owned and trained by Francis F. Dakin, had won the Melbourne Stakes on the Saturday before the Cup, winning by a couple of lengths in front of Belmont, while John Eden Savill's runner The Assyrian was unplaced well back behind the winner. Veteran runner Odd Trick was also in good form, winning the Hotham Handicap in the race following Darebin's win. Etienne de Mestre had brought a number of horses from Sydney for the VRC Spring Meeting, winning the Victoria Derby with Navigator, ahead of Segenhoe, one of three wins on the day for champion jockey Tom Hales. With Navigator withdrawn before the day of the race, the betting favourite was de Mestre's Sweet William who was booked to be ridden by Hales. Winner of the 1882 Caulfield Cup Little Jack, and William Branch's Mistaken were also near the top of the betting charts, with both being trained by previous Cup winning trainer James Wilson. Of the heavy-weighted runners, some fancied 1879 Sydney Cup winner Savanaka who was running in its fourth Melbourne Cup, including a second place finish in 1877, while also highly regarded was Cunnamulla who had also won the Sydney Cup earlier in the year.

== The race ==
Cup Day had dawned fine, but was accompanied by a hot wind. A cool change blew through Melbourne just after noon, bringing with it heavy rain which fell all afternoon through the running of the race. The start was delayed slightly due to Cunnamulla kicking out at other runners, including the favourite Sweet William. It was thought that Sweet William had been injured by the incident. Cunnamulla was moved to the outside of the field as a result of the incident. Following the dropping of the flag for the start, Flying Jib got the best of the early running, with Stockwell taking the advantage at the first turn. Stockwell would lead the field for more than the first mile of the race, ahead of Gudarz and Sylvanus. Stockwell maintained its lead into the final straight, followed by Gudarz, The Assyrian and Darebin. Just behind those four runners were Sweet William and Segenhoe with the remainder of the field out of contention. In the straight, The Assyrian joined both Stockwell and Darebin in the lead and with a final effort, The Assyrian took the lead on the outside to win by a half a length. Stockwell held on to second place ahead of a fast-finishing Gudarz, with Sweet William fourth. The last three runners to finish were First Water, Pollio and Sting. Observers noted that had a more experienced jockey ridden Stockwell, that the horse would have likely maintained its lead to the end of the race, with the rain-sodden ground providing excuses to a number of the more-fancied runners that failed to feature in the finish.

Racing under the name Rothschild when owned by William Pile, The Assyrian had previously run in the 1880 Melbourne Cup, finishing well down in the field behind winner Grand Flaneur. Bred in South Australia, the horse was sold at auction to John Eden Savill who had renamed the horse. A noted artist and theatre manager, Savill ran Adelaide's Lockleys Stud during his time in Australia. It was reported that Savill had sold the horse to his friend James Allison for £300 in the lead up to the race. Allison had lost betting on The Assyrian to win the Caulfield Cup and might have lost more betting against the horse in the Melbourne Cup. The win in the Melbourne Cup was The Assyrian's third, following two wins in Adelaide in 1881. It was the second time a South Australian bred horse had won the Melbourne Cup.

The defeat of both Gudarz and Sweet William was especially costly for Etienne de Mestre who had heavily backed both horses in doubles betting with Navigator to win the Victoria Derby.

Attendance estimates were that more than 80,000 people were at the racecourse, less than the previous year's exhibition inflated numbers. Although it was reported that it was the largest attendance ever seen on the flat, the area inside the racecourse.

== Full results ==
This is the list of placegetters for the 1882 Melbourne Cup.

Place	Horse	Age Gender	Jockey	Weight	Trainer	Owner	Odds	Margin
1	The Assyrian	5y h	Charles Hutchins	7 st 13 lb (50.3 kg)	John Eden Savill	John Eden Savill	16/1	½ length
2	Stockwell	4y h	Reilly	7 st 5 lb (46.7 kg)	H. Tibballs	Thomas Reibey	15/1	½ length
3	Gudarz	4y h	J. Gainsforth	7 st 7 lb (47.6 kg)	Etienne de Mestre	Etienne de Mestre	30/1	Head
4	Sweet William	4y h	Tom Hales	7 st 11 lb (49.4 kg)	Etienne de Mestre	Etienne de Mestre	4/1 fav.	
5	Darebin	4y h	Power	9 st 9 lb (61.2 kg)	Francis F. Dakin	Francis F. Dakin	16/1	
6	King of the Vale	3y c	Sam Cracknell	6 st 4 lb (39.9 kg)	William Lang	Mr J.A. Lang	16/1	
7	Santa Claus	4y h	Trahan	7 st 9.5 lb (48.8 kg) (Note: Was supposed to carry 7st 7lb)	P. Dowling	Mr H. James	40/1	
8	Brunette (late Cuticara)	3y f	Bob Ellis	6 st 2 lb (39.0 kg)	Tom Lamond	Mr B.M. Osborne	100/1	
9	Segenhoe	3y c	Murphy	7 st 12 lb (49.9 kg)	Michael Fennelly	James White	100/1	
10	Sylvanus	3y c	Raynor	6 st 13 lb (44.0 kg)	Etienne de Mestre	Etienne de Mestre	20/1	
11	Cunnamulla	4y h	Teddy McGrade	8 st 2 lb (51.7 kg)	Tom Brown	Mr W.H. Hall	20/1	
—N/a	Lord Burghley	7y h	Paddy Piggott	8 st 12 lb (56.2 kg)	Thomas Ivory	Thomas Ivory	50/1	
—N/a	Savanaka	8y h	William Yeomans	8 st 9 lb (54.9 kg)	John Eden Savill	John Crozier Jr	20/1	
—N/a	The Drummer	4y h	Williamson	8 st 1 lb (51.3 kg)	Joe Monaghan	Fitzwilliam Wentworth	30/1	
—N/a	Odd Trick	7y h	Burton	7 st 12 lb (49.9 kg)	T. Wilson	Mr C. Wilson	12/1	
—N/a	Lord Lisgar	5y h	Thomas	7 st 7 lb (47.6 kg)	T. Thomas	Francis Robert Lewis Rossi (Note: Sometimes known as Captain Rossi)	20/1	
—N/a	Jessie	3y f	Davis	7 st 6 lb (47.2 kg)	Bruce	Mr P.J. McAlister	30/1	
—N/a	Little Jack	3y c	Moore	6 st 8 lb (41.7 kg)	James Wilson	William Branch	8/1	
—N/a	Standard Bearer	3y c	Quinn	6 st 7 lb (41.3 kg) (Note: Was supposed to carry 6st 4lb)	Tom Jordan	Tom Jordan	20/1	
—N/a	Flying Jib	4y h	Barr	6 st 6 lb (40.8 kg)	W.H. Gray	Mr W.H. Gray	100/1	
—N/a	Mistaken	3y c	Jim Gough	6 st 6 lb (40.8 kg)	James Wilson	William Branch	5/1	
—N/a	Anglesey (Note: Sometimes spelled Angelsea)	3y c	Boase	6 st 8.5 lb (42.0 kg) (Note: Was supposed to carry 6st 4lb)	W. Prestwich	Mr S.G. Cook	100/1	
—N/a	First Water	6y h	Brickwood Colley	8 st 6 lb (53.5 kg)	John Eden Savill	John Crozier Jr	50/1	
—N/a	Pollio	6y c	Kilby	7 st 13 lb (50.3 kg)	T. Jones	Mr E. Weeks	25/1	
—N/a	Sting	4y h	M. O'Brien	7 st 10 lb (49.0 kg)	T. Jones	Mr E. Weeks	16/1	
SCR	Commotion	4y h	—N/a	9 st 3 lb (58.5 kg)	Joe Morrison	William Pearson		
SCR	Belmont	3y c	—N/a	6 st 3 lb (39.5 kg)	James Wilson	William Branch		
SCR	Essex	3y c	—N/a	6 st 2 lb (39.0 kg)	James Wilson	William Branch		
SCR	Calma	3y c	—N/a	6 st 1 lb (38.6 kg)	P. Heywood	Donald Smith Wallace		
SCR	The Queen	4y m	—N/a	6 st 0 lb (38.1 kg)	W. Clare	Mr S. Page		
SCR	Navigator	3y c	—N/a	7 st 9 lb (48.5 kg)	Etienne de Mestre	Etienne de Mestre		
SCR	Boolka	3y c	—N/a	7 st 2 lb (45.4 kg)	H. Burrell	Mr H. Burrell		
SCR	Guesswork	3y c	—N/a	7 st 2 lb (45.4 kg)	William E. Dakin	Thomas Elder		

== Prizemoney ==
First prize £1710, second prize £200, third prize £100.

== See also ==
- Melbourne Cup
- List of Melbourne Cup winners
- Victoria Racing Club
