= Mystic Journey Stakes =

- Class: Group III
- Location: Tattersall's Park; Glenorchy, Australia
- Inaugurated: 2006 (Listed)
- Race type: Thoroughbred - Flat racing
- Sponsor: Kevin Sharkie
- Website: https://www.trchobart.com.au/

Race information
- Distance: 1200 metres
- Surface: Turf
- Track: Left-handed
- Qualification: Fillies and mares, three years old and older
- Weight: Weight for age
- Purse: A$150,000 (2025)

The Mystic Journey Stakes, formerly known as the Bow Mistress Trophy, is a Tasmanian Racing Club Group 3 Thoroughbred horse race held under Weight for age conditions, for fillies and mares aged three years old and upwards, over a distance of 1,200 metres at the Tattersall's Park, Glenorchy, Australia in February.

== History ==
The race was previously named after the Tasmanian mare Bow Mistress, who won the 1984 TRC One Thousand Guineas and 1984 VATC Group 2 J J Liston Stakes. The mare was placed in several other graded races on the mainland and is considered one of Tasmania's best racehorses.

In 2024 the race name was changed, it is now named after the Group 1 winning filly Mystic Journey.

The race is usually held on the same day as the Listed Tasmanian Derby.

=== Grade ===
- 2006–2011 - Listed Race
- 2012 onwards - Group 3

== Winners ==
The following are winners of the Mystic Journey Stakes or Bow Mistress Trophy.

- 2026 - Sanniya
- 2025 - Geegees Mistruth
- 2024 - Yellow Sam
- 2023 - Belsielle
- 2022 - Zoushine
- 2021 - Ethical Solution
- 2020 - Zargos
- 2019 - Life On The Wire
- 2018 - Gogo Grace
- 2017 - Ocean Embers
- 2016 - Nautical
- 2015 - I Love It
- 2014 - Isibaeva
- 2013 - Rebel Bride
- 2012 - Rebel Bride
- 2011 - Lady Lynette
- 2010 - Dollops
- 2009 - Flying Ruby
- 2008 - Diamond Cove
- 2007 - Oceano
- 2006 - Con's Amy

== See also ==
- Hobart Cup
- List of Australian Group races
- List of events in Tasmania
- Group races
