= J. E. Savill =

English racehorse owner and trainer in South Australia

John Eden Savill (c. 1847 – 1920), generally known as J. E. Savill or J. Eden Savill, was an Englishman who had a short but successful career in South Australia as a racehorse owner and trainer, culminating in his horse winning the 1882 Melbourne Cup.

== History ==
Savill was born in the parish of Tinwell, Rutland, the only son of George Savill of Ingthorpe House.

He arrived in Adelaide sometime before 1871, when he was, as "Cerberus", drawing political cartoons for The Portonian, a weekly satirical newspaper, and was also exhibiting his artwork. He married and had a home at a property at Campbelltown.

He was a member of the Adelaide Racing Club and acted as starter in 1874. He joined the rival South Australian Jockey Club after its re-formation in 1875. His horse The Buck raced in the Selling Hurdles of New Years Day 1877

With no other qualifications apart from long experience with horses he set himself up as a trainer of thoroughbreds, with considerable success: Wild Irishman, a brown gelding jumper he purchased from Hutchinson, performed credibly without placing and was sold to H. E. Downer. He trained A. R. Malcom's jumper Unknown, grey gelding Sheet Anchor for J. L. Stirling and flat-racer Nelly for George Church.

Around 1878 he took over Gabriel Bennett's lease of Charles Brown Fisher's (1818-1908) Lockleys training stable, just off the Henley Beach Road, and with the assistance of Tom Jordan (c. 1825–1906) made it the most influential training stable in Adelaide. For a time he handled William Pile's stable, but lost that valuable business early in 1880 after the Newmarket incident and Savill's legal tussle with the S.A.J.C. committee, (see below) of which Pile was a member. In May 1881 Pile sold up and Savill purchased his The Assyrian (previously Rothschild). He also trained horses for W. B. Rounsevell, M. C. Jacobs, C. Leslie Macdonald, J. Crozier and Tom Barnfield. Among his successes were:

Device, won the 1878 S.A.J.C. St. Leger Stakes ridden by McMahon; and the S.A.J.C. Accession Winter Handicap followed by the Queen's Guineas (both wins with Tom Hales in the saddle), and subsequently sold to Seth Ferry.
St. Barb won the 1880 A.R.C. New Years Gift and the Newmarket Handicap at Morphettville (held over from Christmas due to bad weather)
The Wandering Jew in 1879 won the SAJC Flying Handicap and Spring Handicap, and later sold to W. A. Long of Sydney
Pawnbroker won the 1879 Newmarket Guineas and S.A.J.C. Spring Derby
Banter won the Adelaide Cup of 1879 and the (Queen's) Birthday Cup of 1880
First Water won the 1880 Adelaide Cup
Sir Charles won the Flying Handicap at the 1880 Christmas meeting
The Israelite won the 1881 South Australian Stakes
Henrietta, her daughter, won the 1881 A.R.C. Trial Handicap
Footstep won the 1882 A.R.C. City Handicap
The Assyrian was bought by Savill from William Pile in May 1881 for £236. Two months later, with 8 st. 6 lb. and 9 st. 1 lb., he won the principal handicaps at the A.R.C. Winter Meeting. He was entered for the 1882 Melbourne Cup with little chance of success, but last-minute rain turned the track to a quagmire, which suited the heavyweight horse admirably and he came home a winner.

In all, Savill won 111 races, with total prizemoney £12,252 10s., not to mention whatever he made on wagers, and "it seldom occurred that a Lockleys horse surprised his trainer by winning".

=== Return to England ===
Shortly after his 1882 triumph with The Assyrian, Savill and family left for England, and lived in St Martin's, Stamford, Lincolnshire. The eldest daughter married the son of a war hero; the youngest married an Earl.

He was involved in thoroughbred racing in England, and had a horse named Ringmaster who won some good races.

In May 1909 he was committed for trial at the Meath Assizes charged with feloniously shooting at one Charles Fortescue Uniacke at Dunboyne, near Dublin on 19 May 1909. He had been summoned to Uniacke's house "The Villa" by his wife, promising that she would be alone. (This was not a romantic tryst: Savile had apparently written to her father and cousin letters containing some accusation.) He entered the drawing room and her husband appeared. A scuffle ensued between them and Savile drew his revolver, which went off harmlessly, though whether deliberate or accidental is unknown.

His death in 1920 went unremarked in the Australian press. Others who sailed to the Colonies, made a fortune and promptly returned to England with their new-found wealth, met a similar fate.

== Personality ==
Savill was seldom seen out-of-doors without kid gloves. He had the habit of speaking his mind in a candid and impartial fashion, which brought him into collision with many associates,

He had harsh words with John Crozier, who was acting as steward at a "Newmarket" race meeting conducted privately by Simeon Barnard at Morphettville on 27 December 1879. Savill apologized, but Crozier made an official complaint to the SAJC. In a series of events strongly reminiscent of the 1889 Seth Ferry — Tattersalls confrontation, the club committee convened a special meeting at which Savill was not present, and imposed on him a twelve months' ban from the course. Savill engaged prominent lawyers J. W. Downer Q.C. and C. Mann Q.C. to sue certain committee members (R. C. Baker MLC, E. M. Bagot and others), but not including Rounsevell and some others. He won the case, with costs, which would have been substantial, and continued racing at Morphettville.

but was popular with the public, who appreciated his honest and straightforward dealings as an owner and trainer.

== Other interests ==
He joined the Adelaide Coursing Club and in 1875, 1876 served as secretary. The club held its meetings at Corryton Park, the property of W. B. Rounsevell at Morphettville.

He was a poultry fancier, exhibited at the Adelaide Show, and later served as judge.

== Family ==
John Eden Savill (c. 1847–1920) married Isabella Sarah Charlotte Macdonald (23 October 1854 – ) on 4 September 1872. She was a sister of C. Leslie Macdonald. Three daughters were:

- Vivienne Jane Savill (4 September 1873 – ) born in Lochen (Lochend?), Campbelltown, married Lucien J. Jerome on 12 September 1899. Jerome was British Consul to Mexico and the only son of Henry Edward Jerome VC. (1830–1901)
- Wassie Houssa Savill (21 November 1874 – ) born in Lochen (Lochend?), Cambelltown
- Maude Maitland Savill (1875–1956) married Ronald Dalzell, 12th Earl of Carnwath (1883–1931) on 23 July 1910. The National Portrait Gallery has several photographic portraits of the Countess.

Their home in 1910 was 31 Clanricarde Gardens, London.
