= James Pile =

Australian pastoralist

James Pile (c. 1799 – 19 March 1885) was a South Australian pastoralist who had extensive holdings on the Darling River in New South Wales, and was succeeded by his sons John, William, and Charles, collectively known as the Pile brothers.

== History ==
Pile was born in Beverley, Yorkshire

He is recorded as being involved sometime around 1840 with John McKinlay and Richard Holland in droving a mob of cattle from the Hawkesbury region of New South Wales to South Australia.

This date appears to conflict with his later arrival in Australia, but it was not unusual for the husband or representative of a prosperous family to act as "pathfinder" to the new colony, assessing opportunities and risks, making contacts and devising strategies and lists of desirable assets before establishing a home and business in a new country.

He left for South Australia on the ship Anna with his wife and family and brother George (c. 1811–1861), arriving in November 1849. In 1850 he became licensee of the Black Bull Hotel, Hindley Street, relinquished later that year. In 1851 and 1852 he was licensee of the Old Spot Hotel on Murray Street, Gawler, but was forced to relinquish it by the weight of outstanding debts.

McKinlay was from around 1850 a family friend. In 1863 he married Pile's daughter Jane Pile (c. 1837–1914).

By 1864 Pile had settled two miles north of Gawler, at "Beckwith" property owned by Thomas Stubbs, and Stubbs' residence to 1858. George Pile was also at "Beckwith" in his last years, died there in May 1861.

He acquired a considerable area of land at Gawler East and Gawler South, as well as properties at Munno Para East and Nuriootpa, which he stocked with horses and cattle droved overland from Sydney.

Some time around 1860, on McKinlay's recommendation, Pile took up land with 60 miles (97 km) western frontage on the Darling River, which became Cuthero, of 15,000 acres (6,100 ha), and Netley stations. A year or two later he sold Netley station to the brothers Joe (c. 1827–1874) (Note: Joe Dunne drowned in Menindie Creek while rescuing his horses.) and John Dunne (c. 1832–1893). Around the same time he also acquired Polia station. At first he stocked Cuthero (Note: Cuthero may have been named for a type of acacia bush.) and Polia with horses and some 1,200 cattle. When his sons reached adulthood he left them to manage of the properties, and built for himself a fine house "Oaklands" on McKinlay Avenue, Gawler East, where he retired, was appointed Justice of the Peace and served as a Town Councillor and Elder of the Presbyterian Church. "Oaklands" was also the home of John McKinlay after he married Pile's daughter, Jane, and where he died at the end of 1872.

Around 1870 the sons turned their attention from cattle to sheep, which thrived, and soon they had built up their small flock to some 200,000. Then came the "seven years' drought" of 1880–1886, and their numbers fell to 12,000. The sons ran the stations until 1899 when, in the grip of the Federation drought, the lease was resumed, was sold to Ben Chaffey in 1909, who later sold it to Arthur Crozier.

James jun. (died 1864)

His eldest son, he drowned while attempting to cross the River Darling anabranch in a bark canoe.

Isabella (died 1864)

His second daughter, she married Thomas Glen, died 6 October 1864, a week after giving birth, two weeks after the drowning of her brother James.

John (c. 1841–1924)

His (subsequently) eldest son was born in Scotland and emigrated to South Australia with his parents. He was educated at Gawler, where he encountered Dick Holland and with whom, at age 13 or 14, he made his first overland droving trip from Sydney to Adelaide with horses. He made his next trip with John McKinlay, who shortly afterwards took over Lake Victoria Station. He managed Cuthero station after the retirement of his father.

He retired to "Netherby", Mitcham. He was a prominent racehorse owner and member of the Adelaide Racing Club. His horses also raced successfully at Gawler, Wentworth, Wilcannia, Menindee, Broken Hill, Albury, Wagga Wagga and Hobart. Mahdi, Havelock and the steeplechaser Confidence (which won an Australian Grand National) were among his best horses. In May 1897 he sold all his racehorses. Seth Ferry purchased Havelock and Joe Carr bought Confidence.

He died at his home, High Street, Glenelg.

William (c. 1841–1916)

His second son William Pile was born in Glasgow, and emigrated with his parents. At the time of the Victorian gold rush, he drove sheep to Ballarat, where he sold them for a handsome profit.

William "Willie" Pile became manager of Polia station, and served as the local magistrate.

A keen racing man, he was a member of the South Australian Jockey Club (SAJC)'s first committee, and owner of The Assyrian, Country Girl and First Water (winner of the 1880 Adelaide Cup and the 1881 Australian Cup). For a time his horses were trained by J. Eden Savill, but after Savill sued certain members of the SAJC committee, Pile included, he withdrew his patronage and a year later sold his stables, horses and all his stock. Savill bought The Assyrian, which went on to win the 1882 Melbourne Cup.

He subsequently joined the Adelaide Gun Club, which in the days before clay pigeons used live birds as targets. He had a 120 acres (49 ha) hobby farm at Morphettville close to the racecourse and the Holdfast Bay railway line (now a tramline), and there built a 40 or 50 feet (12 or 15 m) pigeon tower with boxes for 700 birds, which became a well-known local landmark, and deliberately made larger and taller than that of "Ben" Rounsevell nearby.

Charles (c. 1844–1891)

Charles was the Piles' youngest son, and emigrated with his parents. He was educated at the school run by L. S. Burton (c. 1823–1895). He worked on Cuthero station, and while mustering cattle discovered woodcutter John Hide and his wife, suffering from exposure and dehydration, and the bodies of their five children, having been without water for four days.

He retired to "Oaklands", Gawler, but died, intestate, at South Terrace, Adelaide.

He is not to be confused with Charles Ogleby Pile, Magistrate and Justice of the Peace of Bulahdelah on the Myall River.

== Family ==
James Pile (c. 1799 – 19 March 1885) married to Isabella Pile (c. 1801 – 11 February 1874)

- Anne Pile (c. 1826 – 9 September 1901) married David Power (c. 1814 – 18 April 1884) in 1851, owned Moorak Estate near Mount Gambier; sold to W. J. Browne and left for Scotland, returned to settle in Toorak, Victoria. Power Street, Mount Gambier was named for him.

- David H. Power (1853 – 20 May 1924) married Lizzie Jane Moore ( – 21 October 1896) on 26 July 1893, then in 1900 married Elsie Mary Kerr (17 August 1868 – 1932), eldest daughter of J. Langdon Parsons.
- Isabella Power ( – ) married Francis Reid Murphy MLA (27 March 1844 – 24 January 1892) on 8 May 1878
- Mary Anne Power (1857 – 5 March 1931) married (later Sir) John Grice (6 October 1850 – 27 February 1935) on 8 May 1878
- William Power (1858– )
- Frank Power (c. 1865– ) born in Scotland

- Isabella Pile (c. 1832 – 6 October 1864) married Thomas William "Tom" Glen ( – 2 September 1875) on 8 October 1857. Tom was bookkeeper at Cuthero.
- James Pile (c. 1833 – 26 September 1864) accidentally drowned near Cuthero station
- Jane Pile ( – 14 February 1914) married explorer John McKinlay (26 August 1819 – 31 December 1872) on 17 January 1863. They had no children.
- John Pile (c. 1841 (Note: William and John were not twins, but it is uncertain which was the older son. The passenger list of 1839 puts John before William, which is indicative.) – 20 June 1924) married Emilie Mary Moore (c. 1859 – 13 February 1937) at Sandhurst on 7 September 1881. She was a daughter of James and Hannah Moore of Kangaroo Flat

- Maud Hamilton Pile (25 June 1882 – 1967) married Alan Edmund Bowman ( – 1955), son of Arthur Percy Bowman (1860–1932), pastoralist and racehorse owner of Tatiara, on 29 October 1910. Later of "Myora", Mount Gambier, then Dashwoods Gully.

- Alan Peter Pile (1916 – 15 April 1944), a flying officer with the RAAF, was killed in war service.

- John Hamilton Pile (22 July 1883 – 26 June 1962) married Dorrit Louise Yorke Sparks ( – 1970), granddaughter of Henry Sparks, in 1912. He was licensee of the Reservoir Hotel, Thorndon Park. Lived Dashwoods Gully. He had store on Magill Road in 1949. They divorced in 1931. She married again, on 3 May 1932, to divorcé Daniel Cashel Cudmore (10 February 1881 – 1966).

- John Hamilton Pile (13 March 1915 – 1978) with RAAF during WWII.

- Doris Emilie Hamilton Pile (1889 – 24 February 1899) died of typhoid at Cuthero.
- Jean Hamilton Pile (14 July 1891 – ) born at Netherby, Mitcham, lived at Glenelg

- William Pile (c. 1841 – 20 May 1916) married Mary McLean (c. 1845 – 25 November 1911) on 27 May 1873. Mary was a daughter of William McLean, sen. (c. 1800–1869), the founder of Polia Station.

- Isabel Pile (17 March 1875 – 20 May 1924) born at St Kilda, Victoria while father at Polia. SLSA has a photograph
- James Francis Pile (31 July 1876 – 15 June 1895) killed in hunting accident; his funeral was well attended.
- May Adelaide Pile (7 November 1877 – 1945) married John Tennant Love ( – 24 November 1950) on 30 June 1908. He was MFH, Adelaide Hunt Club 1898–1900.
- William Pile (26 February 1880 – 1971) married Mary Livingstone Reid in 1926. He served with Camel Corps during WWI.
- Charles Leslie Pile (7 August 1881-12 September 1953) married Josephine Connolly Cairns
*Kathleen Esmé Pile (11 April 1883 – ) married Daniel Cashel Cudmore (10 February 1881 – 1966) on 8 December 1910. They divorced in 1930.
- Olive Blanche Pile (29 August 1884 – 28 September 1893)
- (Archibald) Allan Pile (1889 – 12 November 1942) married Olive Elsie Hittmann ( – ) on 25 November 1916

- Charles Pile (c. 1844 – 9 July 1891) never married.
- Jessie Pile (c. 1846 – 30 June 1931), lived at Gawler. She died intestate with a fortune of £100,000.

George Pile (c. 1811 – 15 May 1861) also on Anna, died at home of his brother James.

=== Possibly related ===
Several other people with the surname Pile, and also involved in the hotel and racing industries and subject of newspaper articles, but for whom no family connection has been found are:

Martha Pile ( – 1874), second daughter of John Pile (licensee of Bucks Head Hotel) married Charles Smith Hannington ( – 1 January 1855); married Alfred Snelling on 31 October 1855. She married again, to Thomas Jellett (1822 – 5 August 1876) on 1 July 1868. He bashed, then disowned her; she was confined to Destitute Asylum,

Edward Pile ( – 8 February 1906) married Mary Ann Dugan, (later McCoy, died 1910) licensees, Somerset Hotel. Among their 3 sons and 4 daughters were:

- Lance Pile (c. 1879 – 6 April 1903) also jockey, died from injuries received when horse Nicotine collapsed in hurdle race, Strathalbyn
- Alfred Edward Pile (1884 – 3 August 1937) was a jockey in the employ of Seth Ferry, sued him unsuccessfully.
