= Derwent Entertainment Centre =

Indoor arena in Hobart, Tasmania, Australia

Derwent Entertainment Centre MyState Bank Arena
- Ant's Nest, DEC, Devils' Den, The Deck

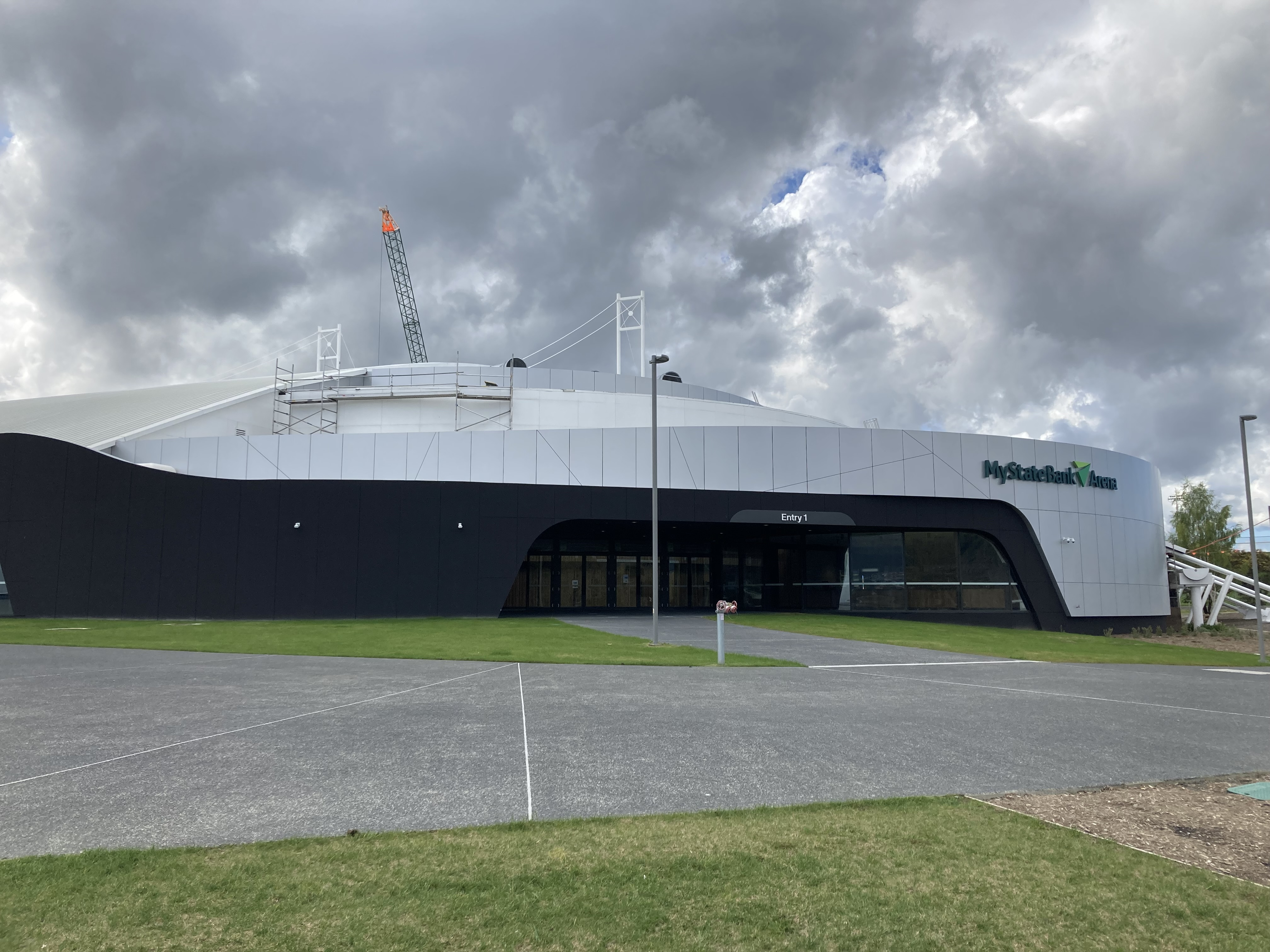
- Interactive map of Derwent Entertainment Centre; MyState Bank Arena
- Address: 601 Brooker Highway, Glenorchy, Tasmania, Australia
- Coordinates: 42°49′27″S 147°16′58″E
- Owner: Tasmanian Government
- Operator: LK Group
- Capacity: 4,340 (NBL and netball); 5,500 (fully seated); 8,500 (general admission)
- Surface: Concrete; Hardwood (basketball)
- Public transit: Buses

Construction
- Groundbreaking: 1987
- Opened: 28 April 1989
- Renovated: 2021
- Architects: Blythe Yeung & Associates Architects, in partnership with Peter Hunt Architects (1989); Philip Lighton Architects (2021)
- Builders: Hansen Yuncken (1989); Vos Construction and Joinery (2021)

Tenants
- Hobart Devils (NBL) (1989–1996); Hobart Chargers (SEABL/NBL1 South) (2017–2023, 2026); Southern Huskies (NZNBL) (2019); Tasmania JackJumpers (NBL) (2021–present); Collingwood Magpies (SSN) (2022); Melbourne Mavericks (SSN) (2024-present); Southside Flyers (WNBL) (2022); Melbourne Tigers (NBL) (2005); Tasmania Jewels (WNBL) (2026-present)

The Derwent Entertainment Centre (DEC), known commercially as MyState Bank Arena since 2021, is Tasmania's largest indoor arena, serving as Hobart's primary location for large indoor sporting events, functions and live entertainment.

Commissioned by the Tasmanian Government and the Glenorchy City Council, the DEC served as the home arena for the Hobart Devils in the NBL from 1989 until 1996, when the team's licence was revoked. Subsequently, between 1997 and 1998, ownership was transferred entirely to the City of Glenorchy, where it became a financial burden and incurred significant maintenance expenses for Glenorchy ratepayers, while seeing limited use.

As the largest enclosed multipurpose venue in Tasmania, the DEC has hosted many Australian and international musical acts, including Kylie Minogue, Bob Dylan, Carole King, The Corrs, James Brown, Leonard Cohen, Tina Turner, Blondie and The Beach Boys.

In 2020, the Tasmanian Government was granted the 10th NBL licence. The government purchased the DEC from the City of Glenorchy and following significant redevelopment, it became the southern home venue for the Tasmania JackJumpers, commencing in the 2021–22 NBL season. Since reopening, the venue has consistently sold 91% of its tickets for all events, including a 100% sellout rate for sporting events.

== History ==
In the early 1980s, the City of Hobart recognised the need for a versatile indoor venue capable of hosting sports, conventions, exhibitions, and international entertainment. Despite Tasmania's small population, it is still a viable destination for musicians touring Australia (whom would often play at smaller venues or theatres); the island was also showing promise in basketball, exemplified by Launceston Casino City winning the NBL championship in 1981. The Hobart Devils, initially based at the 1,800-seat Kingborough Sports Centre, experienced relative success in the mid-1980s, solidifying the case for a larger, purpose-built arena as the franchise's influence expanded. The new venue's location was eventually chosen on reclaimed grounds in the neighbouring City of Glenorchy, created and utilised during the construction of the Bowen Bridge.

Devised with the purpose of becoming the home arena for the Devils, the Derwent Entertainment Centre (DEC) was funded by the Tasmanian Government, the Glenorchy City Council and an Australian Bicentennial construction grant from the Australian Government. Designed by Blythe Yeung and Associates Architects (TAS) in collaboration with Peter Hunt Architects (WA), construction was undertaken between 1987 and 1989 by Hansen Yuncken (VIC). The Derwent Entertainment Centre was handed over to the Glenorchy City Council on 14 March 1989, becoming the largest capacity indoor venue on the island, accommodating 4,875 patrons, fully seated, or 6,925 general admission. Officially opening on 28 April 1989 with a Rick Astley concert, a function area was later named the Astley Room in honour of the inaugural event.

Sports commentators often referred to the DEC as the "Devils' Den" during Devils home games.

On 15 August 1989, the Southern All Stars triumphed over the Australian Boomers by a one-point margin with a final score of 99–98. Wayne McDaniel led the All Stars with 22 points, supported by Mark Davis with 17. Andrew Gaze spearheaded the Boomers' efforts with 25 points, closely followed by Damian Keogh's 23-point contribution.

In 1992, the DEC garnered national attention when it came to light that a prisoner had been escorted to a Bob Dylan concert by his warder and a male nurse as part of his psychiatric treatment. The prisoner, who was serving a jail sentence for fatally injuring his mother, reportedly committed the act while Bob Dylan's One More Cup of Coffee (Valley Below) played in the background.

The Devils set a club record for most points scored at the DEC on 11 September 1993, defeating the Townsville Suns 145–112.

In June 1995, Brisbane Bullets coach Bruce Palmer lodged a formal complaint about a lack of security at the DEC, following an incident in which he and others on the bench were pelted with objects after the visiting team defeated the Devils 107–105. The complaint also sought reduced volume of artificial crowd noise at the venue. Throughout the 1990s, the Devils faced ongoing insolvency issues, leading to the revocation of their NBL license in 1996, along with the Geelong Supercats and the Gold Coast Rollers. The Devils were defeated 79–101 in their final game at the DEC against the South East Melbourne Magic on 27 September 1996. The last NBL game held at the DEC occurred in December 2005, when the Adelaide 36ers faced the Melbourne Tigers in front of 2,416 fans.

In 2002, Tasmanian Liberal Party leader Bob Cheek launched his election campaign at the DEC, opening the event with the Hunters and Collectors song "Holy Grail". The band's songwriter, Mark Seymour, expressed strong disapproval, stating the band were "disgusted by the appropriation of our much-loved anthem by a political party that we utterly despise". Cheek responded by stating that the Tasmanian Liberal Party had confirmed the venue's Australian Performing Rights Association license beforehand.

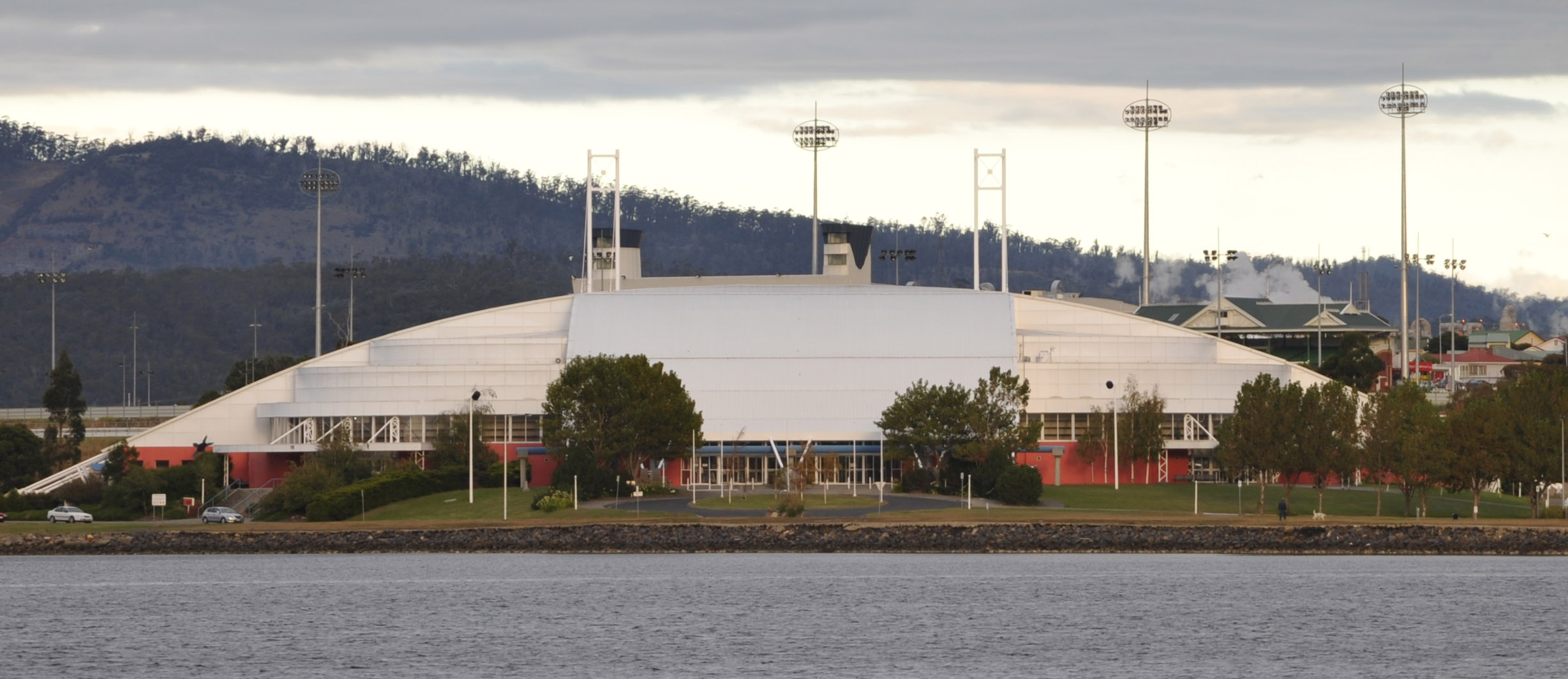
Derwent Entertainment Centre in 2011

On 8 December 2009, a public talk, titled "Our Earth, who is responsible?", was held by the 14th Dalai Lama. The Harlem Globetrotters performed at the venue in April 2013. In 2014, the Glenorchy City Council planned to spend around $1.2 million on venue maintenance between 2014 and 2015, while expecting to regenerate $1.4 million from the facility.

On 2 February 2015, Dave Grohl warmingly gestured and commented onstage, during a sold-out Foo Fighters concert, "Thank God we're playing a respectable-sized venue tonight. Let me tell you, this has been a fucking crazy tour cause we've been playing these mega-fucking stadiums everywhere, every night, and we've been looking forward to coming down here... and playing a gig that seems perfectly reasonable".

In 2015, the DEC hosted six performances of the award-winning musical Cats, starring Delta Goodrem.

On 27 and 28 September 2017, as part of the Australian leg of his Wonderful Crazy Night tour, Elton John and his band performed at the DEC for nearly 5,000 fans on each night, the British musician's first Tasmanian shows since February 1990.

In 2017 and 2018, the Hobart Chargers played their home games in the SEABL at the DEC. In October 2018, the Glenorchy City Council unanimously rejected an unsolicited offer for the DEC from the Southern Huskies consortium, led by Hobart Chargers president David Bartlett and former player Justin Hickey, deeming it inadequate for a significant public asset.

In February 2019, the venue was lauded by audience members attending a Red Hot Chili Peppers concert following prolonged power failure.

=== Sale to the Tasmanian Government ===
In August 2018, the Glenorchy City Council voted unanimously to either sell or lease the Derwent Entertainment Centre. In June 2019, it was reported that the National Basketball League were interested in purchasing the DEC from the City of Glenorchy in order to base a new Tasmanian NBL franchise out of a refurbished stadium. In October 2019, Larry Kestelman, then CEO of the NBL and property developer, proposed a new sporting precinct be erected at Wilkinsons Point, encompassing facilities for a new Tasmanian NBL team, retail spaces, dining establishments and an 11-story hotel. The Glenorchy City Council sold the DEC to the Tasmanian Government for $8 million, and on 2 July 2020 the NBL announced Tasmania had secured the 10th NBL licence. Kestelman's LK Group obtained adjacent land at Wilkinson's Point as a condition for the deal's advancement. The new state team was named the Tasmania JackJumpers, making their debut in the 2021–22 NBL season, with a newly refurbished and rebranded Derwent Entertainment Centre as the team's southern home arena in Hobart.

=== 2021 redevelopment ===
As part of the agreement between the NBL and the Tasmanian Government, the latter provided approximately $67-$68.5 million to upgrade the Derwent Entertainment Centre, commencing in 2021. Designed by Philp Lighton Architects, the refurbishment was undertaken by Vos Construction and Joinery. The venue was reopened by Tasmanian Premier Peter Gutwein on November 10, 2021, with an increased capacity of 4,340 for basketball and netball events, 5,500 in fully seated arrangements, and 8,500 for general admission events.

=== 2024 NBL Grand Final series ===
After 35 years of operations, the venue experienced its first home ground victory in an NBL Grand Final game, when the JackJumpers defeated Melbourne United 82–77 in Game 2 of the 2024 NBL Finals on 22 March 2024. Although Game 4 saw Melbourne United defeat the home side at MyState Bank Arena on 28 March, the JackJumpers ultimately secured their maiden NBL championship, defeating Melbourne United 83–81 in Game 5 of the 2024 NBL Finals at John Cain Arena on 31 March 2024.

== Naming rights ==
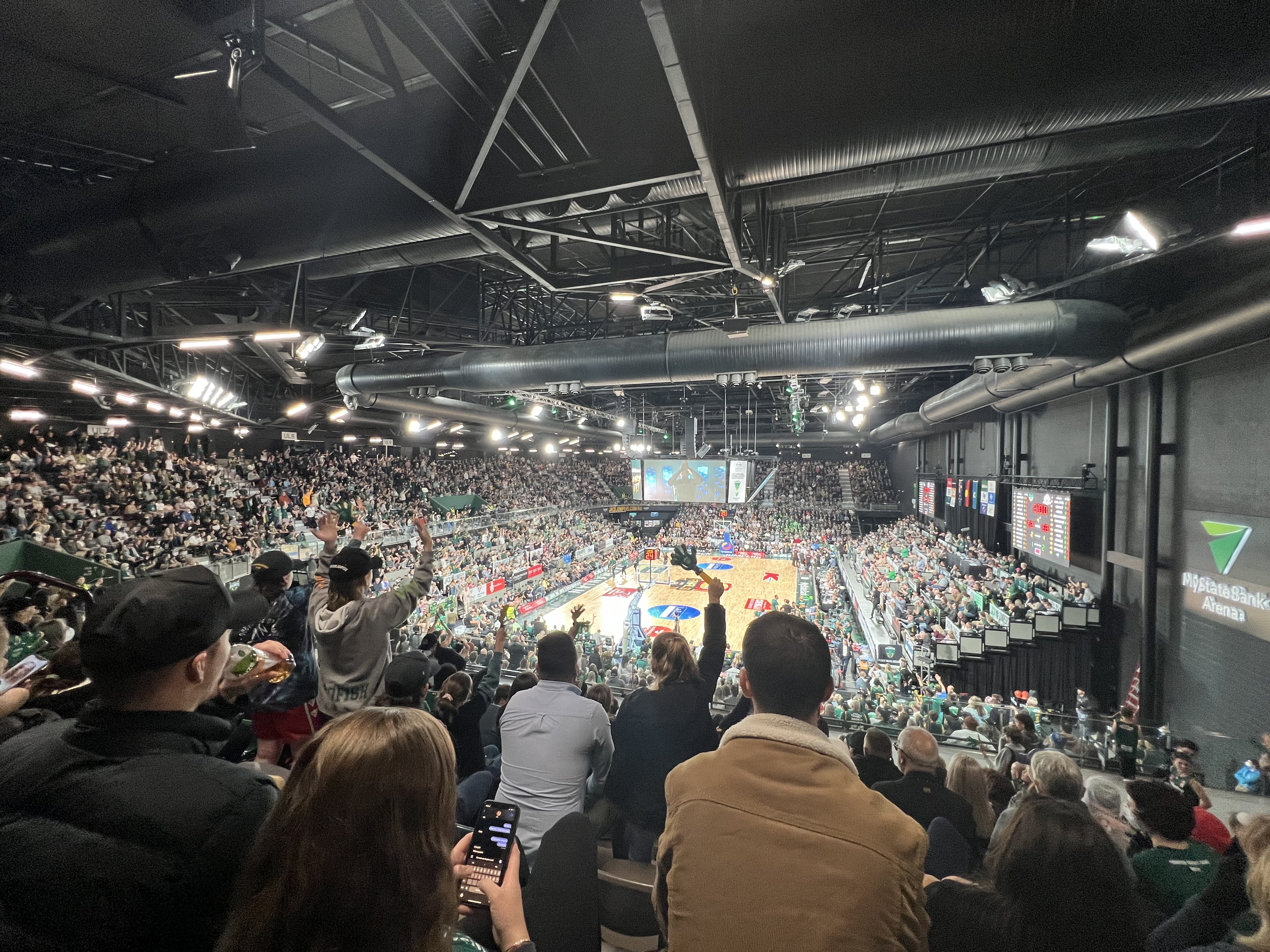
MyState Bank Arena (Derwent Entertainment Centre) during the 2021-22 NBL Finals Series

On 9 June 2021, it was announced that MyState had signed a three-year deal for the naming rights of the DEC, with the venue to be known as MyState Bank Arena.

== Future upgrades ==
In January 2023, NBL CEO Larry Kestelman publicly suggested that expanding the arena's capacity would bring economic benefits, more jobs, and be cost-effective compared to the $375 million required for an AFL stadium at Macquarie Point in the Hobart City Centre. Kestelman emphasised that the arena is Australia's highest-selling venue based on capacity, demonstrating strong demand for larger crowds and events. Incoming NBL CEO David Stevenson also weighed in on Kestelman's comments, noting if approved by the Tasmanian Government, the project could increase venue capacity to over 6,000 for JackJumpers games and over 10,000 for standing concerts.

== Record attendances ==
=== Ceremony ===
- 3,851 – His Holiness the Dalai Lama, 8 December 2009

=== Concert ===
- 7,000 – Foo Fighters, 2 March November 2015
- 6,234 – Powderfinger, 14 September 2010

=== Basketball ===
- National Basketball League
  - 4,685 – Tasmania JackJumpers vs Melbourne United, 23 April 2022
  - 4,685 – Tasmania JackJumpers vs Melbourne United, 30 April 2022
- FIBA Basketball World Cup
  - 4,000 – Australian Boomers vs New Zealand Tall Blacks, 17 July 2006

== Location and access ==
MyState Bank Arena is located between the River Derwent, the Brooker Highway, Tattersalls Park and the Glenorchy Art and Sculpture Park on Wilkinsons Point. The arena is accessible by car via Loyd Road from the Brooker Highway and contains over 1,000 on-site parking spaces available to visitors. The venue is serviced by special Metro Tasmania buses for key NBL games, departing from the Glenorchy Interchange and the Hobart City Interchange. It is a 1.8-kilometre (1.1 mi), 26 minute walk from the Glenorchy Interchange.

== See also ==
- List of indoor arenas in Australia
