= Glenorchy Art and Sculpture Park =

Sculpture park in Hobart, Tasmania

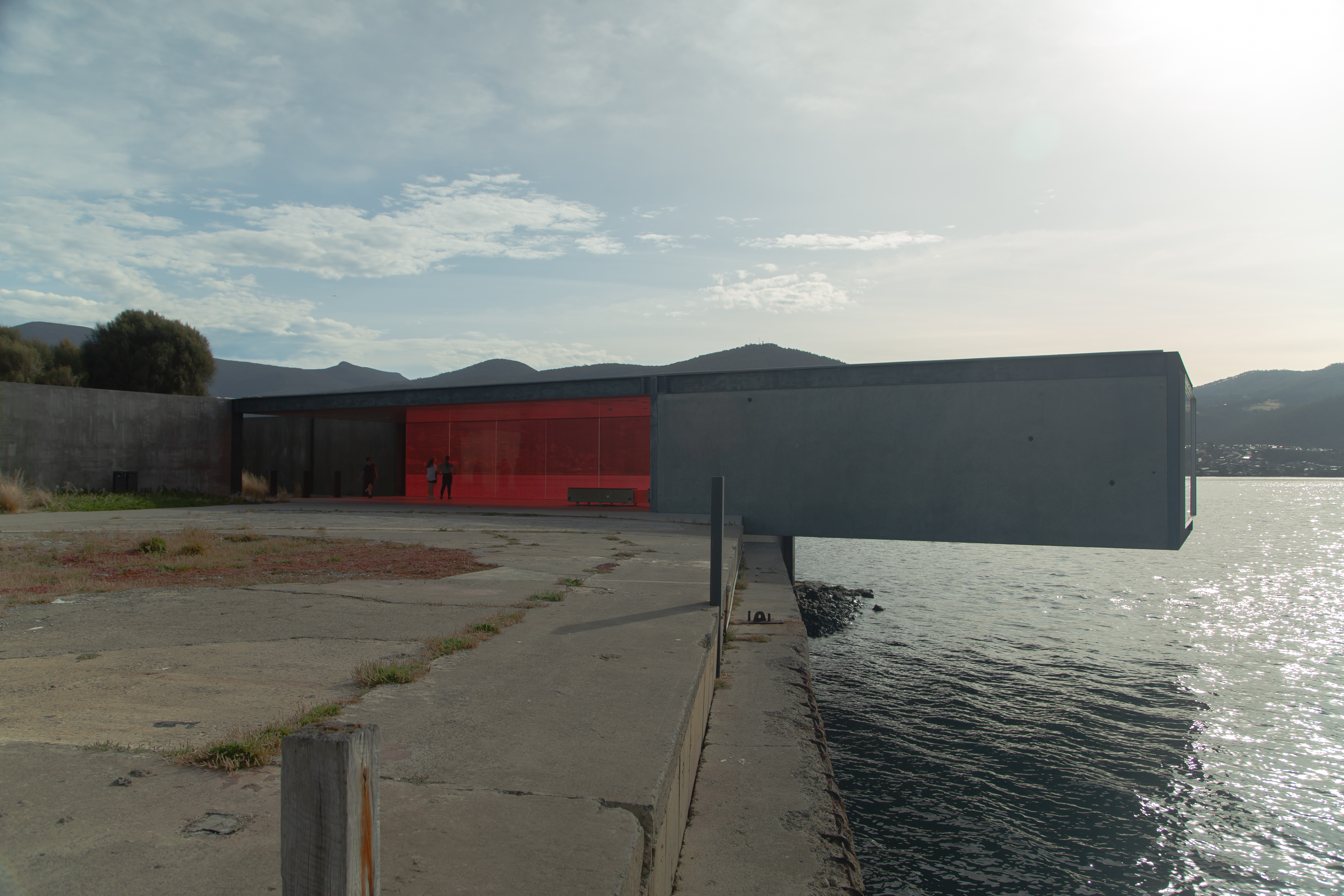
- Cantilever structure at Wilkinsons Point
- Interactive map of Glenorchy Art and Sculpture Park
- Type: Sculpture park
- Location: Wilkinsons Point, Brooker Highway, Glenorchy, Tasmania
- Coordinates: 42°49′11.43″S 147°17′6.41″E
- Area: 2.362 hectares (5.84 acres)
- Designer: Room 11
- Operator: Glenorchy City Council
- Open: 2011
- Status: Open all year
- Website: Official site

The Glenorchy Art and Sculpture Park (GASP) is a sculpture park and boardwalk in Glenorchy, Tasmania, Australia. Commencing at Montrose Foreshore Community Park, GASP follows Elwick Bay's foreshore, terminating at Wilkinsons Point. GASP is near the MyState Bank Arena, Elwick Racecourse and the Museum of Old and New Art (MONA) in Berriedale.

== History ==
In 2005 a small group of civic and business leaders, led by Adriana Taylor and Madeleine Ogilvie and the Glenorchy City Council sought to improve foreshore access and create greater linkage between the town centre and Wilkinson's Point through the creation of a new sculpture park. Access to major recreational and entertainment venues on the point including the Derwent Entertainment Centre and Elwick Racecourse was previously limited to road infrastructure stemming from the Brooker Highway. A design competition was held, with architects Room 11 winning the tender and funding supplied by the Federal Government, Tasmanian Government and Glenorchy City Council. Stage 1 of construction featured a cantilevered structure stretching for 12 metres (39 ft) over the bay's waters at Wilkinsons Point. Consisting of a parkland containing several pathways, promenades and structures forming an arc around Elwick Bay, GASP was opened in 2011 by Prime Minister Julia Gillard with pupils from Rosetta Primary School.

Completed in 2014, Stage 2 included a coloured-glass sheltered pavilion and courtyard at Wilkinson's Point. Stage 2 was built on grounds historically utilised as a building deck for the Bowen Bridge and new sections of the Tasman Bridge following the Tasman Bridge disaster, when the bulk ore transport MV Lake Illawarra struck the bridge in 1975. Multiple coloured-glass panels were shattered by vandals at the pavilion in 2016, instigating CCTV cameras to be installed. The damage incurred costs amounting to $75,000.

== Funding ==
In 2021, the Glenorchy City Council dissolved the Directors of the Glenorchy Art & Sculpture Park, saying it was no longer in a financial position to support the parkland development, citing annual costs of $100,000 and the ongoing effects of COVID-19 as major contributors to their decision. The sculpture park remains open to the public, however funding has not been secured for future development.

== Awards ==
Australian Institute of Landscape Architects

- AILA National Award for Civic Landscape (2016)
- VIC Award for Excellence in Design (2015)

Australian Institute of Architects

- Dirk Bolt Award for Urban Design (2014)

Cement Concrete & Aggregates Australia

- CCAA Public Domain Award (2013)

== Access ==
GASP can be accessed from the Montrose Foreshore Community Park on the eastern end and Loyds Road along Wilkinson's Point. It is a 40 minute Metro Tasmania bus ride from the Hobart City Centre.

== See also ==
List of sculpture parks
