= Hobart Cup =

- Class: Group III
- Location: Elwick Racecourse; Glenorchy, Australia
- Inaugurated: 1875
- Race type: Thoroughbred - Flat racing
- Sponsor: Ladbrokes (2025)

Race information
- Distance: 2400 metres
- Surface: Turf
- Track: Left-handed
- Weight: Handicap
- Purse: A$250,000 (2025)

The Hobart Cup is a Tasmanian Racing Club Group 3 Thoroughbred horse race held as an open handicap race over a distance of 2400 metres at Elwick Racecourse in Glenorchy, Tasmania, Australia.

== History ==
The 1972 winner of this race, Piping Lane, went on to win the Melbourne Cup later in the year.
The Assyrian is the only other horse to win both the Melbourne Cup and Hobart cup in 1882/83.
In the past the race has been held on the Australia Day holiday. It is part of the Tasmanian Summer Racing Carnival, and is also one of Tasmania's main annual social events.

David Pires was the successful jockey in 2016 and 2017. Craig Williams rode the winners in 2008, 2009 and 2014.

Darren Weir trained the winners in 2006, 2008, 2009 and 2013.

=== Distance ===
- 1875–1877 – 2 miles (~3200 metres)
- 1878–1885 - 1 5/8 miles (~2600 metres)
- 1886–1972 - 1 1/2 miles (~2400 metres)
- 1973–1989 – 2380 metres
- 1990–2004 – 2400 metres
- 2005 – 2100 metres
- 2006–2012 – 2200 metres
- 2013 onwards - 2400 metres

=== Grade ===
- 1875–1979 - Principal race
- 1980–2003 - Group 3
- 2004–2006 - Group 2
- 2007 onwards - Group 3

== Winners ==
The following are past winners of the race.

- 2026 - Blonde Star
- 2025 - Strawberry Rock
- 2024 - Aurora's Symphony
- 2023 - Military Mission
- 2022 - Ho Ho Khan
- 2021 - Double You Tee
- 2020 - Toorak Affair
- 2019 - Eastender
- 2018 - Pretty Punk
- 2017 - Count Da Vinci
- 2016 - Up Cups
- 2015 - Geegees Blackflash
- 2014 - Epingle
- 2013 - Hurdy Gurdy Man
- 2012 - Geegees Blackflash
- 2011 - Bid Spotter
- 2010 - Growl
- 2009 - Gotta Keep Cool
- 2008 - Offenbach
- 2007 - Blutigeroo
- 2006 - True Courser
- 2005 - Our Dashing Dane
- 2004 - Zacielo
- 2003 - Jeune's Mark
- 2002 - St. Andrews
- 2001 - Brorama Star
- 2000 - Lord Baracus
- 1999 - Future Shock
- 1998 - L'Espion
- 1997 - Palos Verdes
- 1996 - Jam City
- 1995 - Courtly Way
- 1994 - Southern States
- 1993 - Frontier Boy
- 1992 - Russian Rogue
- 1991 - Have A Heart
- 1990 - Firetap
- 1989 - Nakagima
- 1988 - Brisque
- 1987 - Cylai
- 1986 - Dark Intruder
- 1985 - Macbyrne
- 1984 - Viscount Geoffrey
- 1983 - Palomine
- 1982 - Powerful Prince
- 1981 - Andrias
- 1980 - Strident King
- 1979 - Kubla Khan
- 1978 - Clean Heels
- 1977 - Brallos
- 1976 - Brallos
- 1975 - Lord Pascoe
- 1974 - Knee High
- 1973 - Sir Trutone
- 1972 - Piping Lane
- 1971 - Trial And Error
- 1970 - Dark Purple
- 1969 - Delarus
- 1968 - Bounteous
- 1967 - Haughty Boy
- 1966 - Sailing Prince
- 1965 - Macdalla
- 1964 - Macdalla
- 1963 - Volterra
- 1962 - Great Singer
- 1961 - Welton
- 1960 - Orden
- 1959 - King's Thane
- 1958 - Legismars
- 1957 - Buzzie
- 1956 - Seriki
- 1955 - Seriki
- 1954 - Sea Wolf
- 1953 - Sir Legis
- 1952 - Royal Release
- 1951 - Tarcombe
- 1950 - English
- 1949 - The Artist
- 1948 - Evade
- 1947 - Wingfire
- 1946 - Paramente
- 1945 - Gaelane
- 1944 - Thurso Bay
- 1943 - Lord Saltash
- 1942 - Maco Roni
- 1941 - Mercator
- 1940 - El Nene
- 1939 - Maco Roni
- 1938 - Stylish Lady
- 1937 - Royalty
- 1936 - Coolart
- 1935 - Sunbronze
- 1934 - Song Of Solomon
- 1933 - Air Favourite
- 1932 - Billy Barton
- 1931 - Royal Simon
- 1930 - Tarapunga
- 1929 - Prince Viol
- 1928 - Roonsleigh
- 1927 - Roonsleigh
- 1926 - Royal Simon
- 1925 - Pukka
- 1924 - Llanthony
- 1923 - Binbi
- 1922 - Ouverte
- 1921 - Talisman
- 1920 - †Nadir Shah / Trusty Blade
- 1919 - Prince Moeraki
- 1918 - Ladino
- 1917 - Sea Pink
- 1916 - Polska
- 1915 - Defence
- 1914 - Delphic
- 1913 - Belove
- 1912 - Flavel
- 1911 - Bolan
- 1910 - Eighteen Carat
- 1909 - Jack Smith
- 1908 - Admirer
- 1907 - Viola
- 1906 - Postulate
- 1905 - Newmarket
- 1904 - Proceeder
- 1903 - Chesterfield
- 1902 - Progredior
- 1901 - Timbrel
- 1900 - Eiridsdale
- 1899 - Flintlock
- 1898 - Rosella
- 1897 - Benedict
- 1896 - Lena
- 1895 - Music
- 1894 - Amadeus
- 1893 - Pauline
- 1892 - Hopetoun
- 1891 - Lapstone
- 1890 - Macquarie
- 1889 - Chaldean
- 1888 - Ballarat
- 1887 - Maori Chief
- 1886 - Duration
- 1885 - Ringwood
- 1884 - King Of The Vale
- 1883 - The Assyrian
- 1882 - The Marchioness
- 1881 - Monarque
- 1880 - Avernus
- 1879 - Lord Harry
- 1878 - Swiveller
- 1877 - Spark
- 1876 - Strop
- 1875 - Ella

† Dead heat

== See also ==
- Mystic Journey Stakes
- List of Australian Group races
- List of events in Tasmania
- Group races
