= W. R. Wilson =

Australian businessman and racehorse breeder (c. 1849 – 1900)

William Robert Wilson (c. 1849 – 28 May 1900), invariably known as W. R. Wilson, was a businessman with extensive interests in mining at Broken Hill, and a noted racehorse owner and breeder.

== History ==
Wilson was born in County Tyrone, Ireland. He emigrated to Australia when he was six years old with his mother and siblings after the death by drowning of his father, a civil engineer. He grew up in the Geelong district, and as a young man travelled to New Zealand, then South Australia, where he was in business at Quorn and from there to Broken Hill, where he accumulated considerable wealth.

In the early days of the Silverton mines he was appointed general manager of the Barrier Ranges Association, and was put in charge of the Day Dawn mine. He was a subscriber to the original float of the Broken Hill Proprietary Company, whose success made many investors a great deal of money. Others on that prospectus included George McCulloch, Bowes Kelly, Harvey Patterson, and William Jamieson.

In April 1886 Wilson succeeded A. R. Blackwood as a director of the B.H.P., and later that same year, as one of the few on the board with mining experience, was sent to the US to inspect various mines, and at his recommendation W. H. Patton (of the Consolidated Virginia Company, Comstock lode) was appointed. He was also responsible for recruitment of H. H. Schlapp. In 1891 Wilson was appointed chairman of the board, but resigned the following year when he left to visit Europe, and never rejoined the board. Wilson was also connected with the formation of the Silverton Tramway Company, the Broken Hill Water Supply Company, and other mining ventures in Broken Hill and Western Australia. He was to hold a considerable portfolio of mining shares to the time of his death.

Wilson was a follower of horse racing; before moving to "The Barrier" he was secretary of the Quorn Jockey Club and an official with the Port Augusta Jockey Club, which may have been when he first came into contact with C. Leslie Macdonald, and after moving was a founder of the Barrier Ranges Jockey Club. but it was not until around 1885 that he became interested as a participant rather than a spectator. In 1890 he purchased the St Albans Stud, Whittington, near Geelong, from John Crozier jnr for a reputed £75,000, around twice what Crozier had paid James Wilson (no relation) just four years earlier. He returned to live in Victoria, dividing his time between St Albans and Melbourne.

Wilson went in for an extensive program of breeding, and his autumn sales of yearlings always realised good prices. He appointed Macdonald as manager of the St Albans stud. He imported the stallion Eiridspord, the St Simon mare Elsie (who won many races for him), the mares Eleusis, Beanfeast and Lady Marden from England, and later on the stallion Bill of Portland. One of his most successful sires was Trenton, which he purchased from the Hobartville Stud, and eventually sold to a breeder in England. In 1891 when the Sylvia Park stud of New Zealand was dispersed, Wilson purchased the mare Mersey (dam of Carbine) and her foal Carnage, out of Nordenfeldt, who would later win many good races for him.

Wilson quit breeding and in 1895 dispersed the St Albans Stud on the art union principle, but subsequently bought back the St Albans Estate, the horse Bill of Portland and several of his old mares, from the "lucky winners" at substantially below their valuation, and started breeding again.

Wilson's horses had a great deal of success in some good races, but no winners in handicaps of the importance of the Melbourne or Caulfield Cups, though his Strathmore, Nada, Carnage, Aurum did run a place in the Melbourne Cup. His winners included:

- Australian Cup: Havoc (1895); Bobadil (1899); and La Carabine (1900)
- Caulfield Guineas: Strathmore (1891); Wallace (1895); Aurum (1897); and Bobadil (1898)
- Victoria Derby: Strathmore (1891); Carnage (1893); and Wallace (1895)
- VRC Champion Stakes: Strathmore (1892); Wallace and Quiver, a dead heat — both Wilson entries (1896); and Bobadil (1899).
- VRC Oaks: Eleusive (1897); and Symmetry (1898)
- AJC St Leger: La Tosca (1892); and Wallace (1896)
- VRC St Leger: Strathmore (1892); Aurum (1898); and Bobadil (1899)
- Sydney Cup: Wallace (1896); and La Carabine (1900)

H. J. Morrison was a jockey for Wilson; his father "Joe" Morrison was a trainer for Wilson and Macdonald.

It was suggested on several occasions that Wilson stand for V.R.C. committee membership, but declined nomination. Wilson died at his home "Shanghai", St Kilda Road, after a few months' illness. When he knew death was imminent he gave instructions that his horses' racing engagements should not be disrupted, and his popular mare La Carabine which was entered for the Adelaide Cup and heavily backed by the public, was not scratched but ran, and came third. He was buried in the St Kilda Cemetery, and was survived by his widow and a daughter (Mrs E. Raleigh). His wife died in London two years later.

But as an owner of horses he merely sustained the reputation which he had established in the "roaring days" of the Barrier — the reputation of being a large-hearted, open-handed man; full of enthusiasm; a straight-goer; one who never forgot a kindness or remembered a wrong.

== Family ==
William Robert Wilson (c. 1849 – 28 May 1900) married Ada Wills (died 25 July 1879) on 20 November 1875. They had one daughter:

- May Harriet Wilson (1876– ) married Ernest Raleigh (c. 1862 – 3 July 1935) on 30 March 1898. They had a daughter on 4 February 1899.

In 1886 he married Catherine Campbell Usher (c. 1857 – 25 April 1902).

Harriet Wilson and Anna Maria Collier (of Manaia, New Zealand) were sisters.

Samuel Rupert Wilson (1844 – 6 August 1927), an engineer well-known in Broken Hill, was a brother.

He succeeded William Jamieson as manager of the Broken Hill Proprietary in 1886. He was manager for the Octagon Syndicate in Western Australia 1892–1896, and opened up the Great Fingall mine. He was a chairman of the Adelaide Racing Club, and of Tattersalls Club in Adelaide. As a racehorse owner in South Australia, he had several notable successes. Carrying his colours, Shareholder won the Silverton Cup, Exton the Grand National Hurdle Race, and Messenger the Onkaparinga Steeplechase. He married Mary Warren, daughter of Henry Warren and sister of Sarah Ann Warren; they had one son, Rupert Henry Wilson, and three daughters. He died at his home, Ocean-street Woollahra, and was cremated at Rookwood Cemetery.
