= Adelaide Hunt Club =

Hunting club in Adelaide, Australia

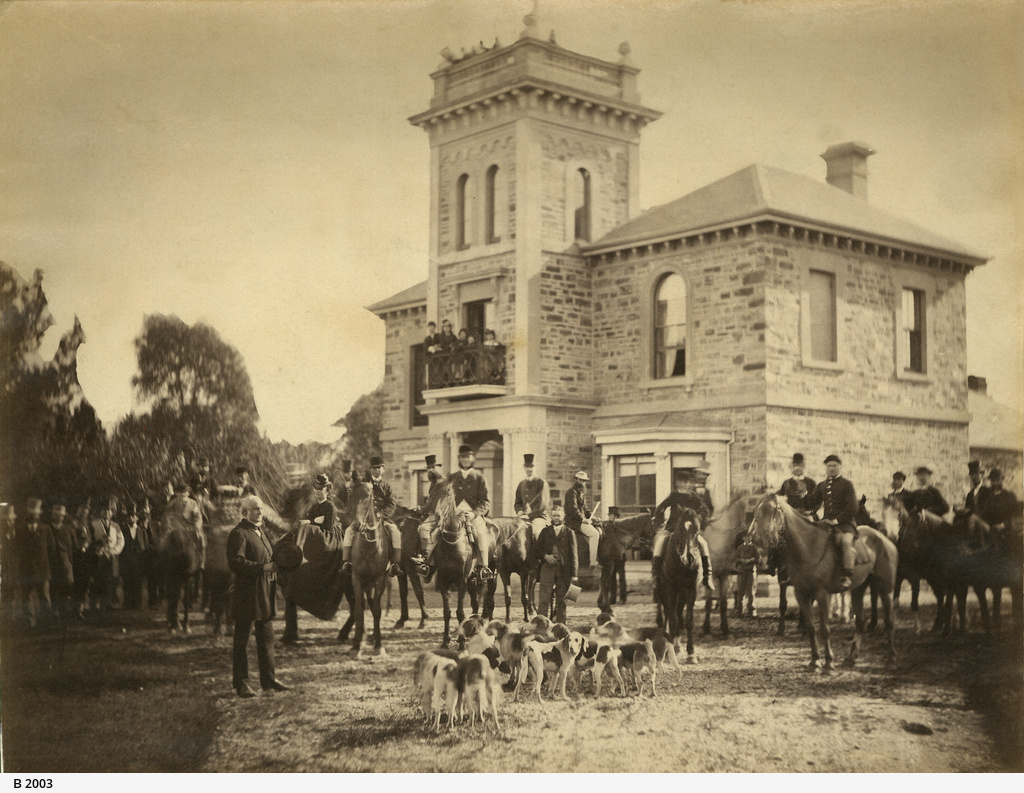
- Adelaide Hunt Club in 1870
- Hunt type: Fox hunting
- Country: Australia

History
- Founded: 1840s
- Historical quarry: Dingo, Kangaroo and Emu

Hunt information
- Hound breed: Foxhound
- Hunt country: South Australia
- Master(s): Andrew Gray
- Huntsman: Andrew Gray
- Quarry: Fox
- Kennelled: Woodside, South Australia
- Website: www.adelaidehuntclub.com.au

The Adelaide Hunt Club is an Australian fox hunting club founded in the 1840s.

== History ==
Originally called The Adelaide Hounds, the club was founded in Adelaide in the early 1840s. As early as 3 July 1841, the Governor of South Australia Sir George Grey KCB along with about 25 horsemen, hounds and ladies in carriages met for a day’s hunting, on this day a wild dog was the quarry. Without foxes to hunt, wild dogs, kangaroos and emus were the early quarry.

Due to lack of support, hunting declined in Adelaide and the pack was dispersed in the 1850s but was revived in 1869 by a group of wealthy sportsmen led by William Blackler, who imported sufficient English Foxhounds to form a pack. The first hunt with his pack was held on 24 May of that year and attracted many interested huntsmen and spectators. In 1871, after a dispute with the Club, Blackler withdrew his support, and at the instigation of James A. Ellery passed his pack to the newly-formed South-East (later Mount Gambier) Hunt Club.

Deer hunting was attempted on several occasions, but provided rather pedestrian sport and the most interesting riding was provided by drag hunting, where an aniseed scent trail was dragged over a course guaranteed to present challenges to the abilities of horse and rider.

The club is very closely linked with the city’s history with events such as the annual ball and steeplechase being social highlights of the new colony. The pack was originally kennelled at various locations on the Adelaide Plains although urban expansion meant they had to move in the late-1900s. The club's current kennels are located at Woodside in the Adelaide Hills.

In 1901 Simpson Newland was president of the club, which at that time held regular meets in the Erindale area.

== Officials ==
Masters (full title: Master of the Foxhounds, MFH) of the Adelaide Hounds included:

- 1844: C. Campbell
- 1847: Thomas Shayle
- 1851, 1852: William van Sittart
- 1855: Arthur Malcom
- 1862: W. van Sittart

Masters of the Adelaide Hunt Club include:

(Elections were held around April of each year)

- 1869: William Blackler
- 1870: E. G. Blackmore
- 1871: William Blackler
- 1872: H. E. Downer
- 1873: Seth Ferry
- 1874: John Hart
- 1875: Arthur Rait Malcom
- 1876: John Hart
- 1877–1878: Sir J. Lancelot Stirling
- 1879: H. E. Downer
- 1880-1881: Sir J. Lancelot Stirling
- 1882: Harry Bickford
- 1883–1884: James Hay (son of Alexander Hay)
- 1885: E. G. Blackmore
- 1886–1892: Allan Baker (son of John Baker)
- 1893–1897: Frank H. Downer
- 1898–1900: John Tennant Love
- 1901–1904: H. C. Cave
- 1905–1906: R. A. Sanders
- 1907–1909: Carew Reynell
- 1910–1912: W. S. Bright
- 1913: K. Lister Colley, grandson of Richard Bowen Colley
- 1914–1915: Ernest M. Luxmoore
- 1919–1921: E. M. Luxmoore
- 1922: J. J. Mortimer
- 1923: E. M. Luxmoore
- 1924–1928: Paul Teesdale Smith
- 1929–1932: W. P. A. Lapthorne
- 1933–1936: E. M. Luxmoore
- 1937–1939: Francis C. Bickford
- 1940: E. M. Luxmoore

Recess during WWII

- 1946–1948: Tom Downer
- 1949: T. H. Hawkes
- 1950–1951: Keith Frayne
- 1952–1954: James R. Balharry

== Race meetings ==
The first Hunt Club race meeting was held at the Thebarton Course on 2 October 1869. Races held were: Hunt Club Cup, Amateur Flat Race, Hunters' Stakes and Hurry Skurry. The meeting was held at the Adelaide Old Racecourse from 1870 to 1874, then Morphettville from 1875 to 1884; then the S.A.J.C. became insolvent and Morphettville was mortgaged and the Hunt Club held its meetings at the Old Course 1885 then back to Morphettville 1886 to 1914, Victoria Park in 1915, then a break until 1919.
