= Adelaide Racing Club =

Horse racing organisation in Adelaide, South Australia

Adelaide Racing Club was a horse racing club which had its origins around 1870 but founded in 1879 in competition with the South Australian Jockey Club. The A.R.C. held their race meetings on the "Old Adelaide Racecourse" (later known as Victoria Park) which they rented from the Adelaide City Council, while the S.A.J.C. owned Morphettville Racecourse freehold.

== History ==
The club had its origin, following the collapse of the first S.A.J.C., in a meeting called in December 1869 by Sir J. H. Fisher, John Baker, Richard Holland, Joseph Gilbert, John Morphett, John Crozier, H. R. Fuller, M.P., and W. W. Tuxford, and a subsequent race run at the "Old Adelaide Racecourse" by a group which included William Blackler, Seth Ferry, Gabriel Bennett, George Church, Dr. Robert Peel and Dr. Thomas Cawley on New Year's Day 1870 and substituting in part for the S.A.J.C.'s customary three-day Summer Meeting.

The S.A.J.C. re-formed in 1875 and in 1876 was given the use of what became the Morphettville Racecourse at a peppercorn rental by the owner, Sir Thomas Elder. A year or two later they acquired the land freehold.

Around the same time, Bennett, Blackler, Ferry and Peel secured, with a right to enclose 15 acres (6.1 ha) and charge admission, the lease of the Old Course, and several successful events were held there in each of the following three years. In October 1879 a meeting held to formalize a Club decided to adopt a modified version of Victorian Racing Club rules; the committee to consist of the four lessees plus three elected members: George Church, Henry Hughes, and W. F. Stock were proposed and elected unanimously. C. J. Coates, a tireless worker for the sport, (Note: Charles James Coates (6 January 1820 – 9 October 1889), a longtime secretary of the Royal Agricultural and Horticultural Society and outgoing secretary of the S.A.J.C. has been cited as a prime mover.) was absent through illness.

In 1879 a 21-year lease on the "Old Adelaide Racecourse" in the East Parklands was secured from the Adelaide City Council on behalf of the Club, at peppercorn rental but with substantial obligations to effect improvements, by Bennett, Blackler, Ferry and Peel. In late 1879 use of a totalizator on South Australian racecourses was made legal, (or more precisely exempt from provisions of the Gaming Act of 1875) and Seth Ferry purchased at the cost of £300 a "box tote", which he leased to the Club at some profit to himself.

Between 1880 and April 1882 three of the lessees dropped out for various reasons, leaving only Blackler and Ferry. As a result of the General Meeting of 17 September 1881, William Gordon was appointed secretary. Stewards elected were: H. E. Downer, M.P., W. Cavanagh, P. B. Coglin, R. Ingleby, Q.C., W. F. Stock, H. J. Morris, E. G. Blackmore, John Pile, H. Hughes, J. Bennett, William Blackler, Seth Ferry, Dr. Cawley, W. E. Ford. J. Cowan, and R. T. Moore; judges: William Blackler and J. Cowan; starter: Seth Ferry; race secretaries, John Harvey and W. Gordon.

During the following six months several committeemen dropped out, alarmed at the club's ballooning financial liability, leaving the committee short of the quorum necessary to appoint replacements and powerless. The remedy resorted to was to re-form the Club, with the following elected pro tem: Stewards: J. Pile, H. Hughes, J.P., W. Cavenagh, J.P., P. B. Coglin, J.P., J. Crozier, H.T. Morris, J.P., J. A. Ellery, Dr. Cawley, and Messrs. W. E. Ford and J. E. Robertson. Committee: Messrs. H. E. Downer, M.P., S. Ferry, T. L. Cottrell, W. A. Blackler, W. Blackler, P. F. Bonnin, B. T. Moore, and W. Moorhouse.

Bookmakers were charged 10 guineas to operate on the grounds. In 1883 a Melbourne "bookie", Joe "Leviathan" Thompson, refused to pay this charge, and sued the lessees for being refused admission. He won, but it was a Pyrrhic victory, costing both parties thousands of pounds. Thompson's true target may have been the totalizator, not the right of the lessees to charge entrance fees. The council, whose lease contract was found to be wrong in law, promptly rewrote it with allowable charges specified.

In mid-1883 the "tote" lost its exempt status, and attendance at race meetings fell away. Then South Australia entered a period of economic downturn, brought about by the drought of 1884–1886, and the racing industry suffered; the A.R.C. disproportionately so, and Blackler felt the time was ripe to cut their losses, and outlined a plan whereby the Council would resume the course and recompense the partners, as they were keen to extend Halifax Street through to Fullarton Road, which would have cut the course in two. Ferry strongly disagreed, and there began the split between the two partners, which became quite bitter, at times to the point of farce. What followed was a few years of low-key meetings run by Ferry — sufficient to satisfy the Council's requirements, but with modest stake money, consequently races with few starters dominated by Ferry's own stable, and poor attendance. Ladies in particular by this time preferred to be seen at Morphettville.

In mid-1886 a series of public meetings was held in Adelaide calling for reinstatement of the "tote", and several Bills were submitted by Rowland Rees, the second of which was passed by the Assembly as the Lottery and Gaming Act (Totalizator) in 1887 but rejected by the Council. Following the 1888 elections the Council passed an amended Bill which became law that same year.

On 11 October 1888, with the economy on the rebound and the totalizator on the verge of becoming lawful, a meeting of interested sportsmen held at the Globe Hotel resolved to re-form the Club once more. A steering committee consisting of Ebenezer Ward, M.P., J. MacDonald, and Samuel James Whitmore was formed. In November 1888 the Blacklers agreed to take over the lease and the Club's debts to Ferry, assessed as £2,500, and brought in a new co-lessee, John Pile. A provisional committee was formed to form a new Club: J. C. Bray, M.P., J. H. Gordon, M L.C.. Messrs. E. Ward, M.P., J. Pile, W. Blackler, J. McDonald, S. J. Whitmore. Gabriel Bennett, and Dr. O'Connell. In December 1888 the Licensed Victuallers' Racing Club (founded June 1888) joined with the rump of the A.R.C. to form a renewed Adelaide Racing Club with an additional 250 members, with the Victuallers' committee augmented by W. Robertson, John Pile, S. R. Wilson, and R. C. Cornish.

S. R. Heseltine, a wine and spirit merchant, was appointed to the committee in February 1891, and in July 1893 he became secretary, a position he treated as a full-time responsibility, having relinquished his business interests before taking it on. For 16 years he had a close working relationship with the club chairman W. B. Carr, the two being largely responsible for the club's revival in the eyes of the public. Heseltine died in 1920 and was succeeded by Hiram Wentworth Varley (died 1927), then in 1927 by Heseltine's son, also named Samuel Richard Heseltine.

== Amalgamation ==
Rivalry between the A.R.C. and the S.A.J.C. was for some time quite intense, and at one stage deteriorated to such an extent that operation of racing in the State was affected. A case in point was the disqualification of the horse Mata by the V.R.C., which they notified to the S.A.J.C., but who perversely refrained from passing on the information. By the time the A.R.C. found this out, from a newspaper item, Mata had been accepted to run in the 1881 Adelaide (Queen's) Birthday Cup. (Note: A.R.C. Birthday Cup, the signature race of the Queen's Birthday holiday weekend in May from 1878; a handicap originally run over 2 miles, later slightly shortened. Winners were: 1878:Lockleys; 1879:Richmond; 1880:Banter; 1881:Mata; 1882:Darebin; 1883:Little Jack; 1884:Ned o' the Hills; 1885:Sardius; 1886:Satyr; 1887:Discovery; 1888:Little Dick; 1889:Stanley; 1890:Harbinger; 1891:Laverock; 1892:La Tosca; 1893:Fulham; 1894:Royal Master; 1895:Hortensius; 1896:Destiny; 1897:Eleusinian; 1898:Thunder Queen; 1899:Town Clock; 1900:Paul Pry; 1901:Footbolt) They refused to scratch the horse, no doubt to needle their antagonist, and Mata won the Cup, to the great enjoyment of the racegoing public, and the S.A.J.C. was admonished by the powerful V.R.C.

The A.R.C. had been a considerable winner by the introduction of the Totalizator, more so than the S.A.J.C., who used their considerable influence in Parliament to reduce the number of days the "tote" could legally be operated. This should have only affected the A.R.C., but the momentum thus created led to the Totalizator Repeal Act of 1883, and the S.A.J.C.'s subsequent insolvency, a case of "unintended consequences" and "biting off one's nose to spite the face".

Numerous attempts were made to amalgamate the S.A.J.C. and the A.R.C.:

- In 1880 Sir Thomas Elder hosted meetings of steering committees, whose agreement to reconcile the two groups was subverted.
- In 1885 a new company, the Racing and Coursing Club, of South Australia, led by J. Rounsevell and Simeon Barnard was formed to purchase the assets of both clubs, and thus form a single entity which could develop the Morphettville racetrack to include a plumpton, but refused to countenance the value Blackler and Ferry put on the sumptuous facilities at their "Old Course".

The neighbouring colony of Victoria had a similar history of two competing thoroughbred racing clubs, but theirs was resolved in 1863 with the formation of the Victoria Racing Club under secretary R. C. Bagot.
