= Seth Ferry =

Australian rider, dealer, owner and trainer of racehorses (1839–1932)

Seth "The Master" Ferry (25 May 1839 – 20 October 1932) was a prominent rider, dealer, owner and trainer of racehorses in South Australia.

== Biography ==
Seth Ferry was born at "Providence House", Ponders End, Lower Edmonton, Middlesex, where his parents John Mattinson Ferry and Mary Ferry, née Beckett, ran a school, and had a family of three daughters and four sons, of which Seth was the second. Other reports have him born in Enfield, Middlesex, purportedly within the sound of Bow Bells.

Ferry, senior, being dissatisfied with his financial position, health, and life in London, and having seen Allan Bell (c.1817–1894) of Mount Barker's prize-winning wheat at The Great Exhibition of 1851, decided on a new life for his family in the young colony. They sailed to South Australia aboard Derwent, and after a voyage of four months arrived in Adelaide in March 1853. Their first billet was in Norwood, where Mrs. Ferry and her daughter established a school for young ladies, which they dubbed "Providence House", near the Maid and Magpie Hotel. Their next move was to Woodside, where Ferry senior founded a timber yard "at a little above ... Adelaide prices", and offered for sale roadside allotments subdivided from his survey. By 1857 he had returned to teaching, at the Lobethal school, and around 1868 moved to "Campbell House", Meningie, where he founded the public school.

Ferry, who had never shown any aptitude for schoolwork, became passionately fond of horses, particularly riding over jumps, much to his father's displeasure. He and his older brother John, after searching for gold at Mount Torrens and Stony Creek with little to show for their efforts, embarked on the timber-getting business, John being particularly adept at splitting wood for shingles. Seth then purchased a team of bullocks and started a carrying business, which was so successful he employed a number of drivers. He then sold his interest in the business and worked breaking horses for J. H. Angas, a prickly character to deal with, he discovered. He made a business of buying up horses, giving them some training and selling at a substantial profit. While on such a purchasing trip to Robe he made the acquaintance of the young Tom Hales, who would become one of Australia's premier jockeys, and Adam Lindsay Gordon, with whom he would have many encounters later, and become something of a friend. He made further trips to Wirrabara, Mintaro and G. C. Hawker's Bungaree station, trading and breaking promising horses.

Ferry got out of horse-breaking and took out an auctioneer's licence, against the advice of auctioneer King, who argued that a vendor could safely get a better price if he had no knowledge of the faults of the animal involved. Later in 1869 he sold up his stock and property apart from the Woodside house and half-a-dozen horses, and took to the road with his brother-in-law (Noble? Peterson?) and a small retinue, buying and selling in the South-East and across the border into Victoria. His tour extended to Ballarat, Geelong and Melbourne, joining in hunts at each location. He made several trips to Victoria, purchasing horses then droving the mob back to Adelaide and selling them at a substantial profit. Soon competition put an end to this lucrative activity and Ferry concentrated his attention on the auction business, first as Ferry & Dawnwell, then Ferry, Moore & Wilkinson.

=== Adelaide Hunt Club ===
He was an enthusiast for fox hunting, and was, with William Blackler, one of the earliest members of the Adelaide Hunt Club, founded after Blackler imported from England enough English Foxhounds to form a pack. Ferry sold Blackler a fine horse, Priam, at a very fair price, which surprised fellow members, thinking he would keep such a champion for himself. Ferry however had a "sorry looking nag" Gipsy Girl, which, despite appearances, was a fearless jumper and the better hunter. Gipsy Girl won the first Adelaide Hunt Club Cup in 1869, with J. C. G. "Candy" Harslett (1850–1937) in the saddle. The 1873 recession in South Australia had a severe impact on the Adelaide Hunt Club, and Ferry was approached by senior members John Hart, Jr. and Arthur Malcom to take on the role of Master of the Foxhounds, which he accepted, and built kennels at his home property on the corner of Unley Road and Commercial Road, Unley. It was on this account he gained the nickname "The Master". He was noted for training horses for hunting and jumps races: hurdles and steeplechases. The Actor, Banjo, Cromwell. Gunn, Sir Ewan, Regent, Ronald, Sarchedon, Simpleton, Simulator, Syntax, The Trojan, and Wallaby were notable.

His horses were successful in some of the early races organised by the Hunt Club: the chestnut horse Sarchedon, which he trained, won the Hunt Cup in 1878 despite his earlier diagnosis of lameness, and repeated the success the following year. His grey gelding Sir Ewan took the Hunt Cup in three consecutive years 1884–1886 with the same jockey, Frank T. Cornelius (c. 1848–1896), with an increasing handicap on each occasion.

=== Onkaparinga Racing Club ===
He was one of the founders, and at his death the last founding member, of the club which is now known as the Oakbank Racing Club, and in its early days served as a steward.

Ferry entered a great many events at Oakbank, but, apart from the Great Eastern Steeplechase, which he won with Darkie (twice) and Gunn and the triumphs of Banjo, even his best horses, such as Wallaby, Sarchedon, Simpleton and Simulator, winners of numerous flat races and hurdles elsewhere, had little success on that course.

=== South Australian Jockey Club ===
In 1875, or perhaps earlier, Ferry and W. H. Formby (c. 1818–1892) were commissioned to investigate the suitability of Sir Thomas Elder's property at Morphettville, then marshland known as "Bay of Biscay Flat", for a racecourse. They reported that the area was susceptible to flooding from the nearby Brownhill Creek, and that it was littered with dips and gulleys, but both problems could be overcome with earthworks and there was no shortage of sand nearby, and in other ways it was an ideal location. A racing club company was then founded, and Ferry was one of the original purchasers of a £5 or £10 share.

=== Adelaide Racing Club ===
Ferry and a small group of sporting gentlemen leased the "Old Course" (later Victoria Park Racecourse) on the East Parklands, for a Queen's Birthday race meeting which they held on 24 May 1878. Subsequently Ferry, Gabriel Bennett, William Blackler, and Dr. Peel secured from the Adelaide City Council, with a right to enclose 15 acres (6.1 ha) and charge admission, the lease of the course for 21 years at nominal rental but with the requirement to effect considerable improvements. This lease, which was renewed in a revised form in 1883 was criticised by the Press. They then set about forming what became the Adelaide Racing Club, which culminated in a General Meeting held at the Globe Hotel on 14 October 1879, which decided to adopt a modified version of Victorian Racing Club rules; the committee to consist of the four lessees plus three elected members: George Church, Henry Hughes, and W. F. Stock were proposed and elected unanimously.

In late 1879 the totalizator was made legal (or more precisely exempt from provisions of the Gaming Act of 1875) on South Australian racecourses, and Ferry purchased at the cost of £300 a "box tote", which he leased to the Club, at some profit to himself if the machine's legal status did not change. Bookmakers were charged 10 guineas to operate on the grounds. A Melbourne "bookie", Joe "Leviathan" Thompson, refused to pay this charge, and sued the lessees for being refused admission. He won, but it was a Pyrrhic victory, costing both parties thousands of pounds. Thompson's true target may have been the totalizator, not the right of the lessees to charge entrance fees. The council, whose lease contract was found to be wrong in law, rewrote it with allowable charges specified.

Between 1880 and December 1881 three of the lessees dropped out for various reasons, leaving only Blackler and Ferry, who were joined by Blackler's son, W. A. Blackler. Several members, alarmed at the club's ballooning financial liability, resigned from the committee, leaving it short of the quorum necessary to appoint replacements, and the Club had to be re-formed.

In mid-1883 the totalizator became illegal again, resulting in reduced attendance at the Adelaide's racetracks; then South Australia entered a period of economic downturn, brought about by the drought of 1884–1886, and the racing industry suffered further; the A.R.C. disproportionately so, and Blackler felt the time was ripe to cut their losses, and outlined a plan whereby the Council would resume the course and recompense the partners, as they were keen to extend Halifax Street through the Parklands, cutting the "Old Course" in two. Ferry refused to co-operate, and there began the split between the two partners, which became quite bitter, at times to the point of farce. At the Globe Hotel one day, Blackler reacted to something Ferry said by threatening to punch his face. Ferry turned to a nearby sportsman, and gave him specific instructions as to how White's Rooms should be secured for the prize fight: Blackler stormed off, fuming.

In 1885 a consortium of businessmen led by William Rounsevell, keen to improve the profitability of the Morphettville course by adding extra facilities like a steeplechase course and a plumpton (coursing track), needed to close down the "Old Course". They offered to purchase the lease from Ferry and Blackler, but could not however countenance Ferry's asking price of £5,000. He had, for no obvious reasons apart the desire to upstage the S.A.J.C., invested twice as much on improvements as the Council conditions had stipulated, notably on the grandstand, which was better appointed than that at Flemington.

In 1886 Ferry was declared insolvent.Then followed a few years where meetings were run by Ferry for his own benefit, to the chagrin of the Blacklers, with John Saunders as secretary running sufficient meetings to satisfy the Council's requirements. Stake money was modest however, attracting few starters to races dominated by Ferry's own stable, and consequently poor attendance. Other entertainments included races between hunting dogs and a kangaroo, which had been specially trained for the purpose. On one occasion the 'roo was saved from a probable mauling by Seth on his fractious jumper Sweep, in a remarkable feat of horsemanship.

On 11 October 1888, aware that the totalizator would soon become legal, a meeting of interested sportsmen held at the Globe Hotel resolved to re-form the Club once more. A steering committee consisting of Ebenezer Ward, M.P., J. MacDonald, and Samuel James Whitmore was formed. In November 1888 the Blacklers agreed to take over the lease and the Club's debts to Ferry, assessed as £2,500, and brought in a new co-lessee, John Pile. A provisional committee was formed to found a new club: J. C. Bray, M.P., J. H. Gordon, M.L.C., E. Ward, M.P., J. Pile, W. Blackler, J. McDonald, S. J. Whitmore, Gabriel Bennett, and Dr. O'Connell.

=== Gawler Racecourse ===
In January 1883, while negotiating the purchase of the gelding Shylock from W. H. Formby, Ferry became interested in the property owned by Jonathan Jenkins, at Evanston, south of Gawler, and its training track, which Ferry fancied converting to a privately owned racecourse, perhaps with a view to getting extra value from his "tote". Jenkins was prepared to sell the property, and Ferry organised a syndicate which included Blackler, and Gawler businessmen James Martin, J. J. Mortimer and H. E. Bright, jr., to effect the purchase and erect a grandstand, fences and the other necessary improvements. For the first race meeting, the Railways department made arrangements for the train from Adelaide to stop near the course for the benefit of performers and spectators, but would not come to a similar arrangement for subsequent meetings. This would have meant everyone unloading at Gawler, then walking or somehow finding transport the 5 km or so to the course, so Ferry organised the hire of special trains, making a useful profit for the organisers. The Railways declined further requests for this service also. In mid-1883 the Totalizator Repeal Act outlawed use of the machine entirely, which had an immediate dampening effect on racing in Gawler as well as the Adelaide tracks.

In mid-1886 a series of public meetings was held in Adelaide calling for reinstatement of the "tote", and several Bills were submitted by Rowland Rees, the second of which was passed by the Assembly as the Lottery and Gaming Act (Totalizator) in 1887 but rejected by the Council. Following the 1888 elections the Council passed an amended Bill which became law that same year.

A consortium of Gawler businessmen took over the course.

Gawler Racecourse railway station was later made permanent.

=== Tattersalls Club ===
Ferry was in May 1879 one of the 55 original members of the South Australian Tattersalls Club, and at his death the last surviving foundation member.

In 1889 Ferry sued the S.A. Tattersalls Club committee for their mistreatment of him as a member. Bookmaker James Carr had complained to the committee of Ferry's demand of him for £45, which Carr claimed was fraudulent. Committee members P. F. "Fred" Bonnin, George Aldridge and S. J. Jacobs heard the complaint, finding against Ferry, and the full committee, "posted" him (i.e. suspended his membership) for malpractice. Ferry then decided to sue the Club's committee, and engaged J. H. Symon to represent him. In the Supreme Court, under Justice Boucaut, Ferry won on the grounds that Ferry was denied due process, having been denied the opportunity to confront his accusers and defend himself. He was awarded £250 damages with costs and reinstatement. Tattersalls ran their first race meeting to recoup their losses.

He appears not to have held any official position with the club, but was an habitué, having a regular game of dominoes with Jim Aldridge, or "sitting at a table with a few cronies playing fives" (perhaps five-card draw poker), and no doubt games of billiards, at which he was an expert, and of course his "investments" with the bookmakers.

=== Later activities ===
In 1903 he was sued by Alfred Edward Pile (1884–1937), one of his jockeys, for a beating Seth had administered him. The magistrate upheld Ferry's right to administer corporal punishment to an apprentice.

Ferry invented a double-ended buckle for equestrian applications and in 1903 founded the Ferry Buckle Company, Ltd. to patent and manufacture the device, which clearly met with little enthusiasm, as the company was liquidated in 1906.

Ferry was often called on to act as horse judge (roadster and blood stock classes) at country shows from 1879 to 1926, and the Royal Adelaide Show most years from 1892 to 1914.

=== Stables ===
In December 1890 his training stables at Watson Avenue, Rose Park, were destroyed by fire.

In 1896, he purchased the pony racing stables on South Road, Edwardstown opposite "Babbage's Castle", originally owned by Emmanuel Solomon, then became training stables owned by William Gerrard and Thomas "Tom" Jordan (1824–1906), "Jordan Park", which he renamed "Sydney Park" in honour of his elder son. It was later owned by George Bennet and named Allan Park, after his Allandale Station.

== Some notable race wins ==
- 1869 the inaugural Adelaide Hunt Club Cup at Thebarton on his mare, Gipsy Girl. Adam Lindsay Gordon competed in the same event.
- 1874 Adelaide Hunt Club Cup at the Old Course on his brown gelding Darkie
- 1877 Great Eastern Steeplechase at Oakbank, with Darkie
- 1878 Great Eastern Steeplechase at Oakbank, with Darkie
- 1878 Hunt Club Cup with chestnut horse Sarchedon
- 1879 Hunt Club Cup with Sarchedon
- 1880 Great Eastern Steeplechase at Oakbank, Gunn (Dugan the jockey); many speculated did not run the course the three times, hiding behind a hedge for the second run round. The hedge was cut down the following year.
- 1883, 1884 and 1885 Hunt Club Cup at Morphettville, with Sir Ewan; ridden by F. Cornelius.
- 1887 and 1888 Hurdle Race at Oakbank: Speculation, with Arnold Ferry in the saddle.
- 1891 A.R.C. Grand National Hurdle: Simpleton (A. Ferry); at 12 stone the heaviest ever handicap for this race.
- 1895 Simulator won the Queens Birthday Cup and Banjo the Selling Hurdle Race, pulling off a big betting coup with the double. Ferry had been acting as host to (later Sir) Charles Wentworth Dilke, who collected around £12,000 on the double from the bookmakers.

== Ferry, "Laradale" and The Herald ==
Between 9 March 1918 and 1 February 1919 The Herald ran a weekly feature, Fifty Years of Racing: Sporting Reminiscences of "The Master" Seth Ferry. Instalments 1–35 were bylined "Laradale" (William W. Goddard), based on interviews with, and notes supplied by Ferry. Chapters from No. 36 were not attributed, and the series ended at No. 46 with no explanation. Goddard later sued the Co-operative Printing and Publishing Company, publishers of The Daily Herald, for withholding part of his wages.

== Recognition ==
Ferry Place, Gordon, Canberra, was named for him.

An event "Seth Ferry Hurdle Race" run at Cheltenham on 20 October 1923 was named in his honour.

== Family ==
John Mattinson Ferry (20 September 1806 – 6 May 1886) married Mary Beckett (c. 1804 – 25 October 1889). Among their children were:

- John Ferry (c. 1832 – 24 May 1903) married Emma de La Hant (c. 1837 – October 1932) in 1857. He was a teacher at Balhannah, Cherry Gardens and Morphett Vale

- William Seth Ferry (1862 – 27 May 1942) an SAR employee, remembered in connection with "Bob the Railway Dog".

- Seth Ferry (c. 1840 – 20 October 1932) married Mary Ann Noble (c. 1846 – 14 June 1897) of Bungaree on 31 May 1865. The wedding was remarkable for being held at Bungaree, where her parents lived and worked; they then drove a buggy and pair the 110 miles (180 km) to Woodside, for dinner with his parents. The trip involved changing horses four times, and was accomplished in a little over 10 hours. Their children were:

- (Seth John Noble) Arnold Ferry (27 January 1868 – 1926) married Elsie Ada Barker on 21 February 1900
- (Mary Martha) Edith Ferry (26 April 1870 – ) married Dr. George Woods, LK, QCPI, LRCSI on 18 May 1891
- George Peterson Herbert Ferry (20 September 1872 – 30 November 1874 of diphtheria)
- (Emmy Maud) Violet Ferry (10 June 1874 – 4 March 1939) died in Bridgetown, Western Australia
- Sydney William McTaggart "Syd" or "Sid" Ferry (1877 – 2 August 1945), jockey whose first win was at age 10 or 11, confusingly credited as "Master S. Ferry", later race steward and licensee of Duke of York Hotel. He also ran a riding school for apprentice jockeys. He married Adela Moody (1879–1954) in 1904; they had a home on Springbank Road, Clapham.
- (Naomi Caroline) Gertrude "Queen" Ferry (1 January 1879 – ) married Edward Blore Bednall on 13 July 1905
- Margaret Beckett Nesta "Beischie" Ferry (19 December 1880 – ) married Edward John Stuart on 23 December 1903

- Mary Ferry (c. 1845 – 30 October 1916) married Peter Peterson ( – 24 November 1920) on 28 May 1868
- Sarah Ferry (c. 1851 – 19 October 1937) married Peter Peterson ( – 24 November 1920), her sister's widower, in 1917
