= Elwick Racecourse =

Horse racing venue in Hobart, Tasmania, Australia

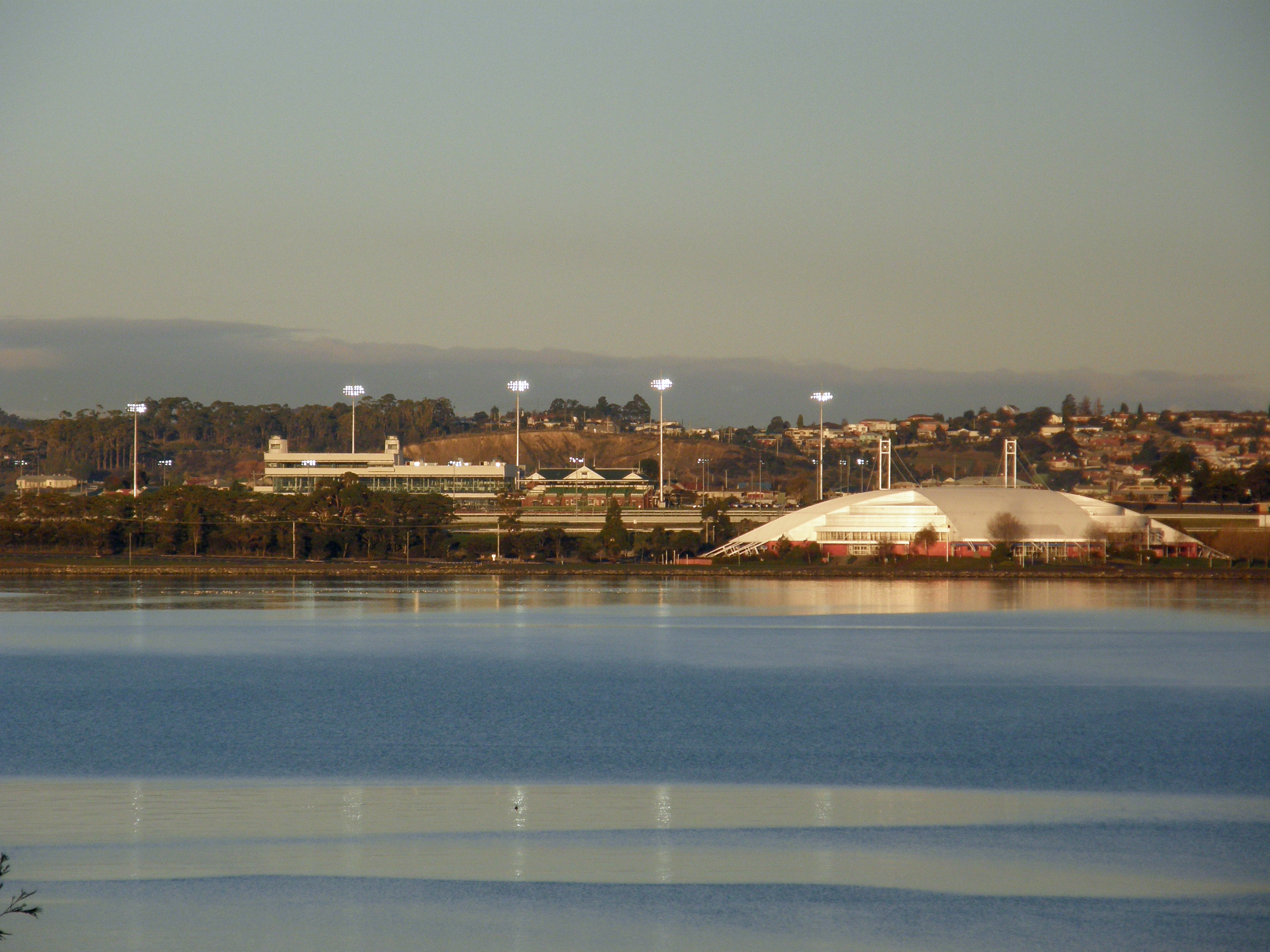
- The Elwick Racecourse and Derwent Entertainment Centre at dusk from Elwick Bay
- Interactive map of Elwick Racecourse
- Location: Glenorchy, Tasmania
- Coordinates: 42°49′25″S 147°17′13″E
- Owned by: Tasmanian Racing Club
- Date opened: 1874
- Course type: Flat
- Notable races: Hobart Cup

Elwick Racecourse, known for naming rights reasons as Ladbrokes Park Elwick, is a thoroughbred horse-racing venue located on Goodwood Road, Glenorchy, Tasmania, Australia. It is located in close proximity to the Brooker Highway, Hobart Showground, Derwent Entertainment Centre, Glenorchy Art & Sculpture Park and the River Derwent. The racecourse has a picturesque outlook across the river, as well as being dominated by views of Mount Wellington. It features at least 110 race meetings and 210 trial days a year, but is most well known for hosting the Hobart Cup.

== Design ==
Elwick Racecourse is an approximately egg shaped anti-clockwise circuit with four straight starting lengths, and seven starting positions. These are located at 800m, 1000m, 1200m, 1600m, 2200m, and 2400m. The 2200m start is to the left of the pavilion, meaning the horses pass the crowd at the beginning of the race, and is the start position for the Hobart Cup.

== History ==
Race meets have been conducted at the site since the late 19th century, which was first leased by the TRC in 1874, and later bought by them. Elwick had already developed into a popular venue by the 1880s.

=== Elwick Drive-In ===
Tasmania's first drive-in cinema, known as the Elwick Drive-In opened on 27 September 1956, operated by Northside Drive-In Theatres Pty Ltd. Located within the track, it hosted space for 676 cars. It was taken over by Tasmanian Drive-in Theatres (Village Cinemas) in 1968. It operated until March 1985, with all traces of the venue disappearing by 2004. The worldwide decline of interest in the entertainment model led to its demise, though in recent years nostalgists have called for its return within the scope of seasonal and special event screenings.

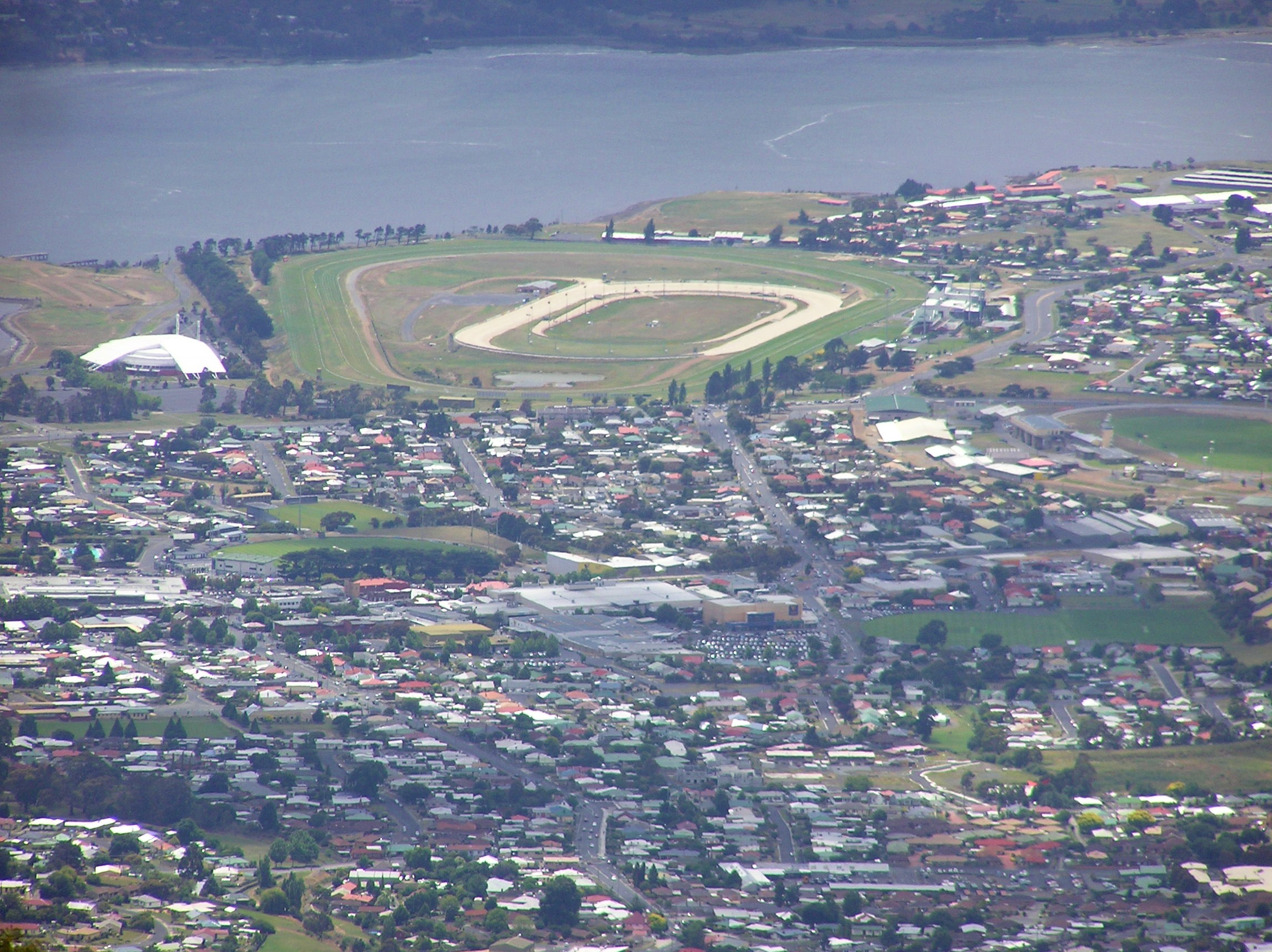
Elwick Racecourse viewed from Mount Wellington in 2012

=== 2000s redevelopment ===
In 2004 the Tasmanian Government undertook a $20 million redevelopment of the venue. The redevelopment involved the construction of a new 970 metre long, 19 metre wide harness track and a 700 metre long and 6 and a half metre wide track for greyhounds, as well as a redevelopment of the heritage listed grandstand, new bookmakers area. Lawned areas sweep down to the mounting ring, birdcage and the enclosures. Three public lounges and two dining areas are present in addition to members' facilities.

The track was renamed from Tattersall's Park to Ubet Park in 2015 and once again in 2016 to Luxbet Park, followed by yet another renaming to Tab Park Elwick, and once again in July 2019 to its current name of Ladbrokes Park Elwick.

== Hobart Cup ==
The inaugural Hobart Cup winner was Ella in 1875. Held in February, the Hobart Cup is competed over 2,400 metres with handicaps. In 2022, total prize money is $250,000.

== Hobart Greyhound Racing Club ==
The Hobart Greyhound Racing Club (HGRC) switched to Elwick Racecourse after the $20 million development had been completed. The first race meeting was held on 2 November 2006. Races are held over distances of 340, 461, 599 and 709 metres. Previously the HGRC had raced at Royal Hobart Showground from 1980 until 2006 and before that at the TCA Ground from 1935 until 1980.
