= The Assyrian (horse) =

Australian-bred Thoroughbred racehorse

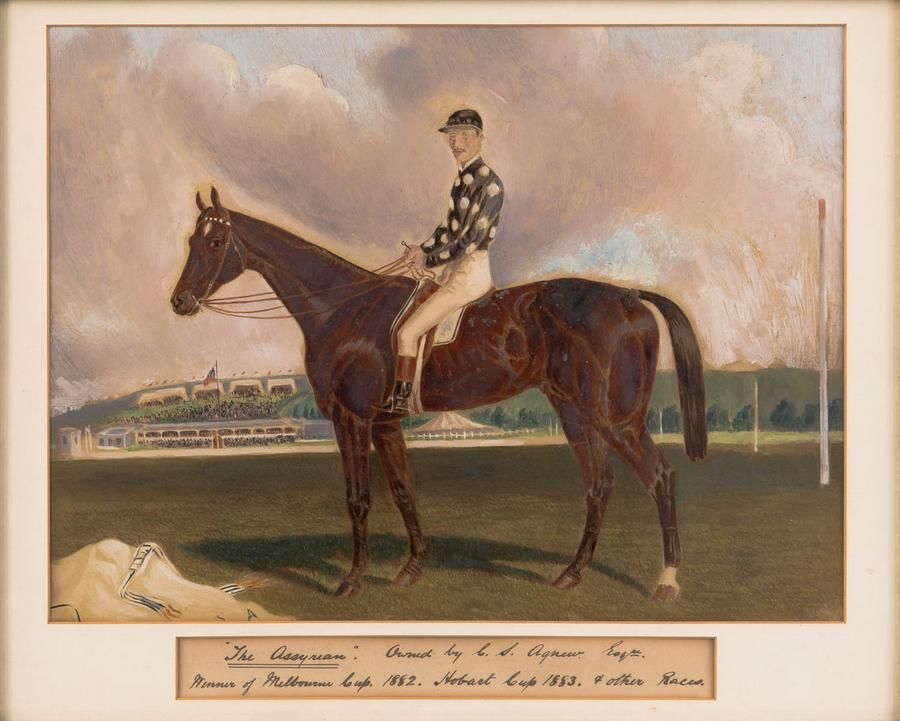
- Sire: Countryman (GB)
- Grandsire: Stockwell (GB)
- Dam: Tinfinder (AUS)
- Damsire: Tarragon (AUS)
- Sex: Stallion
- Foaled: 1877
- Country: Australia
- Colour: Bay
- Owner: C. S. Agnew
- Trainer: John Eden Savill
- Record: 31: 9-6-2

Major wins
- South Australian Derby (1880); Melbourne Cup (1882); Hobart Cup (1883)

The Assyrian was an Australian bred Thoroughbred racehorse owned and trained by J. E. Savill that won the 1882 Melbourne Cup being ridden by Charles Hutchins, possibly a reference to the Assyrian people of Mesopotamia. She was a half sister of The Israelite, both being daughters of the famous mare Tinfinder.

The Assyrian, originally named Rothschild, was bred in the Turretfield stud of Richard Holland by the imported horse Countryman, from Tinfinder. As Rothschild, he won the SAJC Derby in 1880.

In the final stages of the 1882 Melbourne Cup, The Assyrian drew clear to defeat Stockwell by half a length, and send the heavily backed Gudarz into third place. The Assyrian also won the 1883 Hobart Cup, becoming the only horse to win both the Melbourne Cup and the Hobart Cup for almost 89 years until being joined by Piping Lane in 1972, with the currently two remaining alone in the achievement.

== Pedigree ==
Pedigree of The Assyrian (AUS) 1877
Sire Countryman (GB) 1867	Stockwell (GB); 1849	The Baron	Birdcatcher
Sire Countryman (GB) 1867	Stockwell (GB); 1849	The Baron	Echidna
Sire Countryman (GB) 1867	Stockwell (GB); 1849	Pocahontas	Glencoe
Sire Countryman (GB) 1867	Stockwell (GB); 1849	Pocahontas	Marpessa
Sire Countryman (GB) 1867	Village Lass (GB); 1851	Pyrrhus The First	Epirus
Sire Countryman (GB) 1867	Village Lass (GB); 1851	Pyrrhus The First	Fortess
Sire Countryman (GB) 1867	Village Lass (GB); 1851	Maid Of Hart	The Provost
Sire Countryman (GB) 1867	Village Lass (GB); 1851	Maid Of Hart	Martha Lynn
Dam Tinfinder (AUS) 1871	Tarragon (AUS); 1858	New Warrior	Pyrrhus The First
Dam Tinfinder (AUS) 1871	Tarragon (AUS); 1858	New Warrior	Colocynth
Dam Tinfinder (AUS) 1871	Tarragon (AUS); 1858	Ludia	Waverley
Dam Tinfinder (AUS) 1871	Tarragon (AUS); 1858	Ludia	Peri
Dam Tinfinder (AUS) 1871	Deceptive (AUS); 1865	Yelverton	Gemma di Vergy
Dam Tinfinder (AUS) 1871	Deceptive (AUS); 1865	Yelverton	Deceptive
Dam Tinfinder (AUS) 1871	Deceptive (AUS); 1865	Blossom	The Swede
Dam Tinfinder (AUS) 1871	Deceptive (AUS); 1865	Blossom	Violet
