= Thoroughbred racing in Australia =

Horse racing in Australia

Thoroughbred horse racing is a spectator sport in Australia, and gambling on horse races is a very popular pastime with A$14.3 billion wagered in 2009/10 with bookmakers and the Totalisator Agency Board (TAB). The two forms of Thoroughbred horseracing in Australia are flat racing, and races over fences or hurdles in Victoria and South Australia. Thoroughbred racing is the third most attended spectator sport in Australia, behind Australian rules football and rugby league, with almost two million admissions to 360 registered racecourses throughout Australia in 2009/10. Horseracing commenced soon after European settlement, and is now well-appointed with automatic totalizators, starting gates and photo finish cameras on nearly all Australian racecourses.

On an international scale Australia has more racecourses than any other nation. It is second to the United States in the number of horses starting in races each year. Australia is third, after the U.S. and Japan for the amount of prize money that is distributed annually.

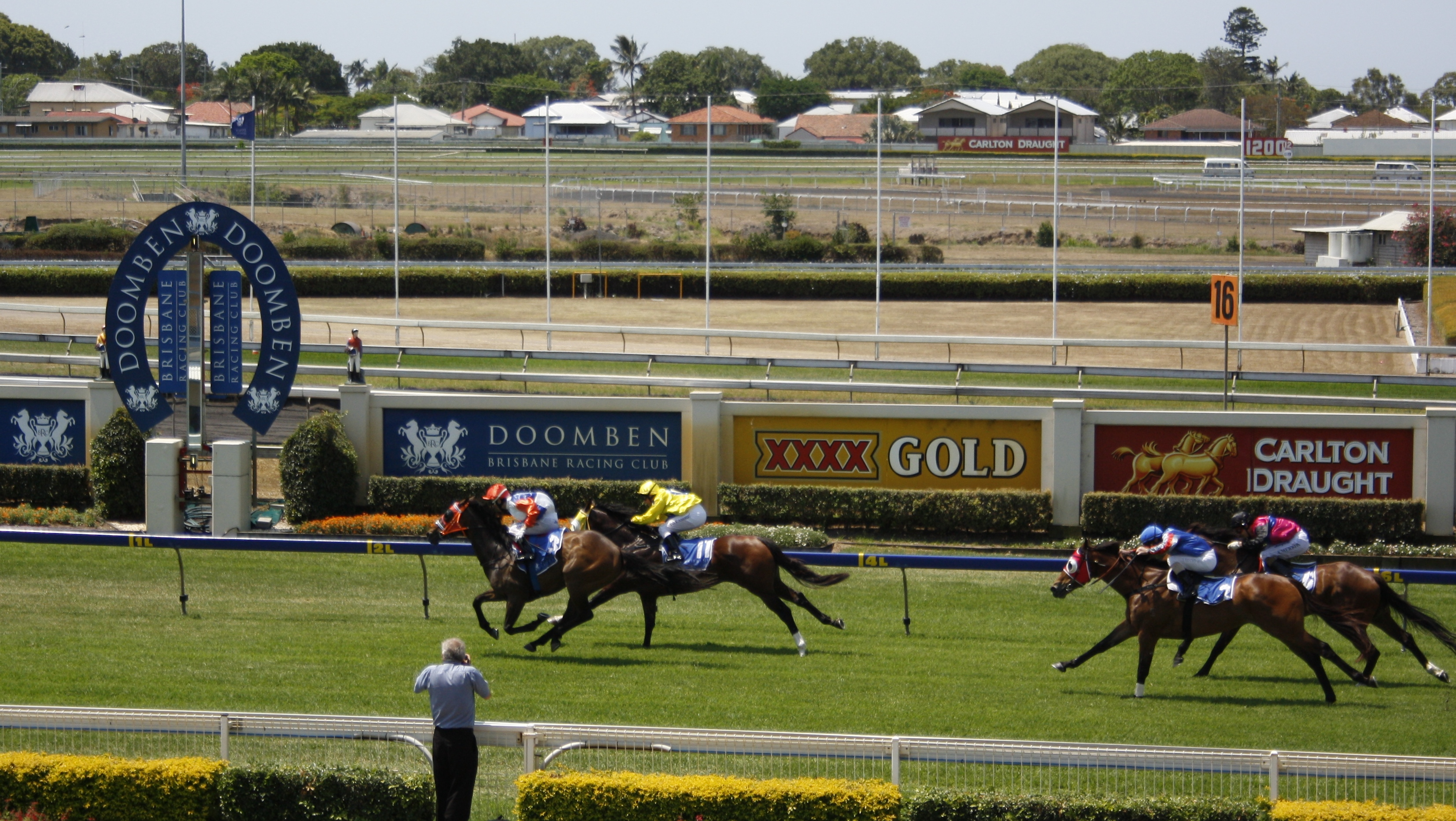
Thoroughbred racing at Doomben Racecourse.

== Racing industry ==
The value of Australian thoroughbred horse stocks (A$ millions) since 1989

Racing in Australia is administered by the Australian Racing Board, with each state's Principal Racing Authority agreeing to abide by, and to enforce, the Australian Rules of Racing.

Besides being a spectator sport, horseracing is also an industry, which provides full- or part-time employment for almost 250,000 people, the equivalent of 77,000 jobs. About 300,000 people have a direct interest as individual owners of, or members of syndicates which own, the 30,000 horses in training in Australia. There are bookmakers, over 3,600 registered trainers and more than 1,000 jockeys, plus farriers and veterinarians involved at race meetings alone. Race meetings are organised by approximately 374 race clubs that conduct about 2,694 meetings on 360 racecourses around Australia for over $427,245,000 in prize money.

== Important races ==
Public interest in Thoroughbred racing, especially during the main spring and autumn racing carnivals, has been growing in recent years with over 100,000 attracted to the running of the Melbourne Cup, the Victoria Derby, the VRC Oaks and the Champions Stakes race meets. The Golden Slipper Stakes, Caulfield Cup and W. S. Cox Plate are also major attractions.

== History ==
=== Horses ===
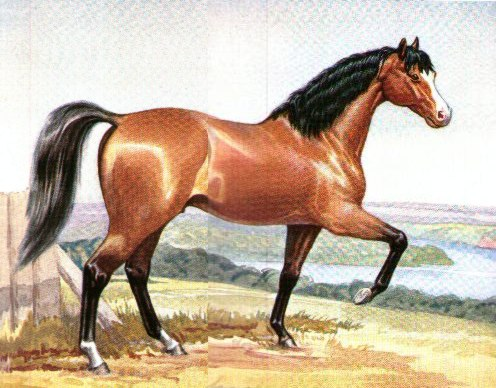
An early importation to Australia was the Arabian stallion (Old) Hector, whose bloodlines are to be found in the pedigrees of some Australian Thoroughbreds.

The first horses that came to Australia arrived on the Lady Penrhyn with the First Fleet on 26 January 1788. It is thought that they consisted of one stallion, one colt, three mares, and two fillies from Cape Town, South Africa. (Young) Rockingham was one of the first bloodhorses to be imported into Australia, c. 1797. In 1802, the stallion Northumberland and an English mare were imported, followed shortly thereafter by Washington, a stallion from America. (Old) Hector, was an important Arabian horse that was imported to Australia c. 1803 and whose bloodlines have survived in Australian Thoroughbred pedigrees. Northumberland and Hector were the two leading sires in Australia until 1820. These sires and a number of other Arabian stallions contributed to the breeding up of the bloodhorse population prior to 1825. Manto, imported in 1825, was the first General Stud Book recorded Thoroughbred mare known by name to arrive in Australia. Her family is still producing winners. In 1826 the Thoroughbred stallion Peter Fin, and mares Cutty Sark and Spaewife, were imported.

The first recorded public auction of bloodstock took place in 1805. After the 1830s more English bred horses were imported for racing, as more racing clubs were formed in the country areas of New South Wales. The politician and race-horse owner William Long claimed that the breeding of thoroughbreds had improved the quality of hackney, carriage, saddle and buggy horses in Australia.

Malua, foaled in 1879, was the most versatile Australian Thoroughbred racehorse, winning classic races on the flat and the VRC Grand National Hurdle before becoming a good sire. The New Zealand bred Carbine was one of the early champions of the Australian turf, and was later inducted into the Australian Racing Hall of Fame and the New Zealand Racing Hall of Fame. His descendants, the New Zealand-bred horses Phar Lap and Tulloch (the first horse to win more than £100,000 in Australia) also became champions of the Australian turf. Bernborough, Kingston Town, Heroic, Makybe Diva (bred in England) and Winx were other champions that have been inducted into the Australian Racing Hall of Fame. On 31 March 2011 Black Caviar was rated the best Thoroughbred racehorse in the world by Timeform (with a 135 rating) for the period of 1 October 2010 to 27 March 2011.

Australian Thoroughbred breeding has long been involved in the importation of horses, especially from Europe and later the US. Initially the British importations were identified on records with (imp) or an asterisk (*) added as a suffix to indicate that they were not locally bred. With the advent of importations from other countries and the use of shuttle stallions that stand at stud in Australia during the Northern Hemisphere's winter, these suffixes were replaced by an abbreviated country suffix. These took the format of, e.g., (USA), (GB), (IRE) and (FR) etc.

Australian-bred stallions exported to America have proved very successful at stud there. Some of these exported horses include, Bernborough, Shannon, Sailor's Guide, Noholme, Tobin Bronze and Royal Gem.

Annually, about 8,500 horses are retired from racing, many of which are slaughtered for an export market in human consumption.

Throughout its history, horseracing has become part of the Australian culture and has developed a rich and colourful language.

=== Early race meetings and clubs ===
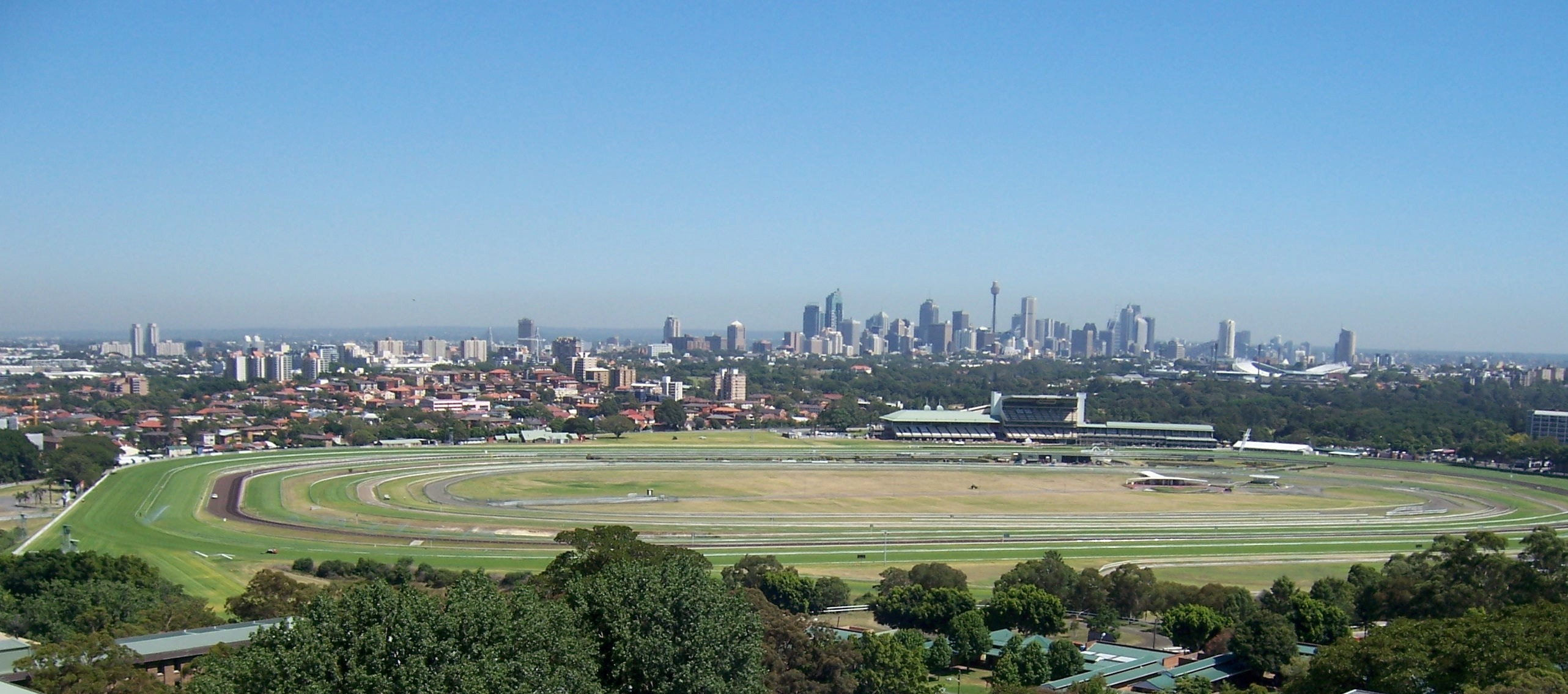
Royal Randwick Racecourse with Sydney skyline in background

Horseracing had become well established in and around Sydney by 1810. The first official race meeting was organised by officers of Governor Macquarie's visiting 73rd Regiment and held at Hyde Park, Sydney in October 1810, starting on Monday 15th and continuing on the Wednesday and the Friday. The Australian Jockey Club (AJC) held its meetings at Homebush from 1842 to 1859, before moving to Randwick in 1860. The AJC has its headquarters at Randwick where it plays a major role in the regulation of the sport. The Sydney Turf Club (STC) was formed in 1943 and held races on the Rosehill Gardens track and at Canterbury. This club was the initiator of the world's richest race for two-year-olds, the Golden Slipper Stakes. The Australian Jockey and Sydney Turf Clubs Merger Act 2010 merged the two clubs under the name of the Australian Turf Club.

In Victoria the first official races were held in March 1838 on a specially marked out course at Batman's Hill in Melbourne. The Victorian Racing Club (VRC) was formed from the amalgamation in 1864 of the Victoria Jockey Club and Victoria Turf Club.

Queensland's first recorded race meeting was held at Cooper's Plains in 1843. The major race club, the Queensland Turf Club (QTC), was formed in 1863, followed by the Brisbane Amateur Turf Club (BATC) in 1923.

South Australia's first meeting was held at Adelaide in 1843. The principal race club, the South Australian Jockey Club (SAJC), was founded in 1856.

Organised racing was first held in Tasmania in 1814 at Newtown, near Hobart. The Tasmanian Turf Club (TTC) was formed in 1871, but the major club, the Tasmanian Racing Club (TRC), was not established until 1874.

Thoroughbred racing commenced in Western Australia in 1836. The Western Australian Turf Club (WATC) was established in 1852.

By 1883, 192 country clubs were registered to race under Australian Jockey Club rules.

In the Northern Territory, the Darwin Turf Club was established in May 1955.

=== Breeders and stud farms ===
The early breeders of Australian bloodstock were men of historical significance such as Robert Campbell, William Lawson, John Macarthur, John Piper, Richard Rouse of Rouse Hill and D'Arcy Wentworth.

Charles Smith established Bungarribee stud at Doonside, New South Wales, shortly after 1830, which only had pure-bred English horses. It was Charles Smith who bred the great colonial stallion, Sir Hercules who was foaled in 1843.

James White (1828–1890), owner of Kirkham Stud, was one of the most successful owner/breeders in Australian racing with his horses winning two Melbourne Cups, six Victoria Derbies and five AJC Derbies.

The three eastern mainland states supply 85% of Australian racehorses with the Hunter Valley being the favoured region for thoroughbred horses in New South Wales. In Queensland the Darling Downs is the major nursery. Hurtle Fisher's Maribyrnong Stud was a famous stud in Victoria where expensive imported horses were used until it was dispersed in 1866. The St Albans Stud at Geelong was established in the 1850s and was still operating over 100 years later. Tranquil Star was bred here and Briseis was bred, owned and trained by James Wilson at this stud.

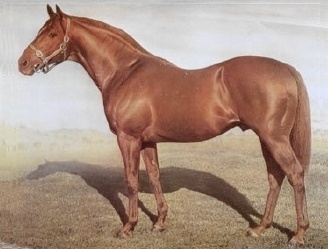
Star Kingdom

The Widden Stud in the Hunter Valley, NSW was established by John Thompson in 1867. Since then Widden Stud has been home to some of the finest stallions and broodmares including the following who were all at various times Australia's champion sire; Lochiel (four times leading sire), Grafton (four times), Maltster (five times), Bletchingly (three times), Vain (once) and Marscay (twice). Heroic, Ajax and Todman were other famous Widden stallions. The stud has had a seven generation unbroken chain of ownership under the Thompson family.

Percy Miller (1879–1948) in 1914 established Kia Ora Stud just east of Scone. Miller imported the leading sire, Magpie (GB) who ran second in the English 2,000 Guineas Stakes. This stallion sired Windbag, Amounis and Talking. Kia Ora Stud had the leading imported sires, Midstream and Delville Wood who sired champions, Shannon (exported to the United States), Delta, Hydrogen and Evening Peal etc., plus a superb band of brood mares.

Stanley Wootton exerted a major influence on Australian racing when he imported the stallion Star Kingdom, now recognised as the most influential sire line in this country. Wootton also bred the outstanding Biscay and Bletchingly.

=== Jockeys ===
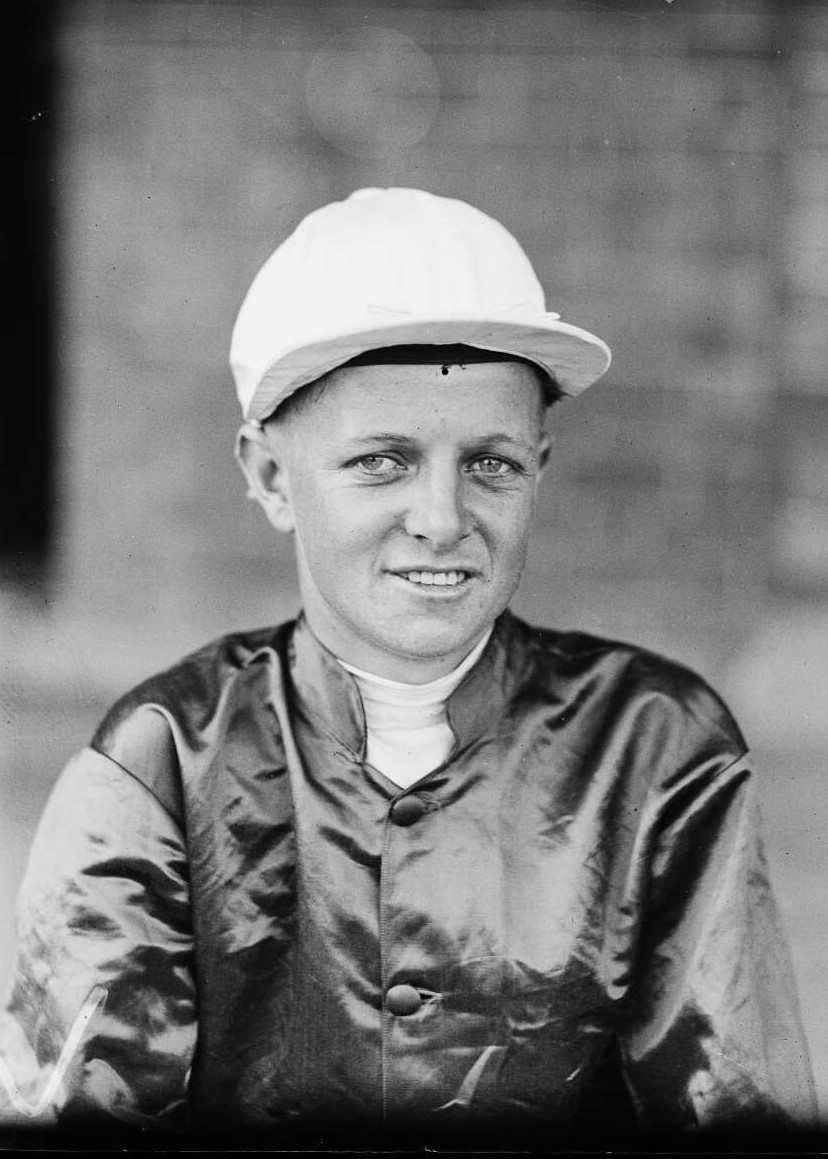
Jockey Edgar Britt, 22 January 1934

Australian jockeys are some of the best in the world and were among the first in the world to experiment with the crouched riding style. In the late 19th century Tot Flood and James Barden pioneered this crouch style in Australia independently of the American, Tod Sloan, after whom the style was named. Australian jockeys have successfully ridden on racecourses across the world. Some of the notable jockeys include, Scobie Breasley (four times British champion jockey), Edgar Britt, Mick Dittman, Roy Higgins, George T. D. Moore, Nash Rawiller, Neville Sellwood, Harry White and Bill Williamson.

In the 1850s amateur "ladies only" events were held in Victoria, Australia but women were not permitted to ride as professional jockeys or on professional tracks. Although women jockeys were still barred from riding in the mid-20th century Wilhemena Smith rode as Bill Smith at north Queensland racecourses.

In the 1920s Hilda Thomas (b 1905) is reported to have raced in Western Australia, on special race-day granted permits, as she wasn't eligible for a jockey's licence. There's little record of this except a 1927-28 West Australian Turf Guide, where she was named the jockey of an unplaced horse. Unofficial records suggest that her brother may have been given the placing in the records.

During 1974 the VRC permitted female jockeys to be registered for professional "ladies only" events. Pam O'Neill and Linda Jones, in 1979, were the first women jockeys that were licensed to compete in registered races against men.

=== Trainers ===
Historically, the most notable trainers in Australia are Bart Cummings (trainer of 12 Melbourne Cup winners) and Tommy Smith who had won 30 successive Sydney Trainers' Premierships prior to his death. Other successful trainers include Jack Denham, Lee Freedman, Colin Hayes, David Hayes, Etienne L. de Mestre, James Scobie and Gai Waterhouse. In recent years, Chris Waller and Darren Weir have experienced success.

In the 2015/16 Season, Weir broke John Hawkes' record for most winners in a season.

In 1962 Betty Lane applied to the AJC for a metropolitan trainer's licence but was refused as "it's not our policy to license women." After the refusal she became a successful premiership winning trainer in the Western Districts of NSW, where she was permitted to train. In 1982 Betty Lane became the first woman trainer with a Number One Trainers Licence.

In 2019, Victoria Police raided properties owned by Darren Weir in Warrnambool and near Ballarat, and arrested Weir, 48, and two other men relating to the corruption of betting results and animal cruelty. Police found what was believed to be cocaine and four devices known as "jiggers", which can deliver electric shocks. "In relation to the conducted energy devices, or the jiggers, clearly the allegation is that they may be used against a horse with the aim of improving their performance on a particular race day" Assistant Commissioner Neil Paterson said.

=== Stud books and registrations ===
The Stud Book of New South Wales by Fowler Boyd Price was published in 1859, and was the first official attempt to document the pedigrees of the colony's bloodhorses. The Victorian Stud Book was then published in Volumes 1-2 which were edited by William Levey to the year 1864 and volumes 3-4 edited by William Cross Yuille to the year 1874. The Australian Stud Book (ASB) began in 1878 as a private venture by A. & William C. Yuille, Melbourne bloodstock agents who published nine volumes. New Zealand horses were included in the ASB until Volume VII appeared in 1900. The copyright was sold in 1910 to the AJC and VRC who now administer matters concerning the breeding of racehorses.

The ASB online database contains the records of over 860,000 horses, which includes every Australian foal born since 1972. This database includes 28,000 winners of major races in Australia and around the world. A 3,000 plus pages, printed version of volume 42 of the ASB contains the breeding records of 43,000 mares and 70,000 of their named offspring.

In the 1880s it was decided that all Thoroughbreds in Australasia should have their official ages calculated from 1 August.

The Registrar of Racehorses controls the naming, registration, leasing and transfers of all horses racing in Australia. Racehorses must be registered to race, but do not have to be purebred Thoroughbreds in order to be registered and race in Australia. Prior to 1980 it was not uncommon to see a racehorse registered as "by an unidentified sire out of a station mare". During 1980 it was regulated that horses without registered parents could not be officially named.

The registration of racing colours is also handled by the Registrar of Racehorses.

=== EI outbreak ===
Equine influenza (EI) was initially discovered in a metropolitan Sydney horse complex in late August 2007, and spread to many areas of New South Wales and southern Queensland. This immediately stopped all equine pursuits nationwide, but soon racing in those states without EI cases resumed. The entire racing industry was put under great pressure because of a lack of racing for Standardbreds and Thoroughbreds.

== Administration of racing in Australia ==
=== Australia ===
Racing in the Australian continent is governed by the Australian Racing Board. This body supersedes the power of the principal clubs, which were once the sovereign body of racing in every state until government reforms introduced separate governing bodies for the industry. The board is constituted of the various principal racing bodies in each state. The board is directly responsible for establishing the rules of racing (subject to additional local rules), the establishment and maintenance of the pattern racing committees, responsible for grading races and allocating black type status, as well as establishing a number of advisory groups to attempt to maintain uniformity in procedures between states and establish an accepted national racing calendar.

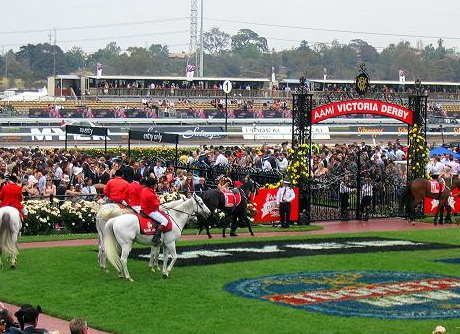
The setting for the VRC Derby

=== Victoria ===
Victoria is considered to be the home of racing in Australia, with international races like the Melbourne Cup and Cox Plate. The governing body is Racing Victoria Limited. The principal club is the Victoria Racing Club, which races at Flemington; the two other metropolitan clubs are the Melbourne Racing Club, which races at Caulfield and Sandown, and the Moonee Valley Racing Club, home of the Weight for Age championship of Australasia, the Cox Plate. The state boasts many top-class provincial and country racecourses including Pakenham, Cranbourne, Mornington, Geelong, Ballarat, Bendigo, Mildura, Stony Creek, Wangaratta, Warrnambool, Moe and Tatura.

=== New South Wales ===
Racing in New South Wales is governed by Racing NSW. The principal club is the Australian Turf Club, which races at Randwick, Warwick Farm, Rosehill Gardens and Canterbury Park. The state's major provincial tracks are Newcastle and Kembla Grange, which alternate their meetings every second Saturday. Other notable tracks include Hawkesbury, Gosford and Grafton which hosts the largest race carnival in Australia outside of a capital city.

=== South Australia ===
Racing in South Australia is governed by Thoroughbred Racing S.A. Limited. The principal club is the South Australian Jockey Club, which races at Morphettville (and previously Cheltenham until its closure in 2009, and Victoria Park until 2008). Additionally, the Oakbank Racing Club holds the highly popular Oakbank Easter Racing Carnival with its two meetings on Easter Saturday and Easter Monday.

=== Queensland ===
Racing in Queensland is governed by Racing Queensland, with the principal club being the Brisbane Racing Club, formed out of a merger between the Queensland Turf Club (Eagle Farm) and the Brisbane Turf Club (Doomben). The most significant Queensland race is the Stradbroke Handicap, held at Eagle Farm over 1,400 metres. The BRC hosts the vast majority of metropolitan meetings in Queensland. Outside of Brisbane, meetings are held each Saturday at the Gold Coast and Toowoomba racecourses. The Sunshine Coast Turf Club operates a considerable facility at Caloundra, Queensland. Country racing is also popular in Queensland, with several country cups attracting large crowds throughout the year - the most notable being the Roma Cup in November.

=== Western Australia ===
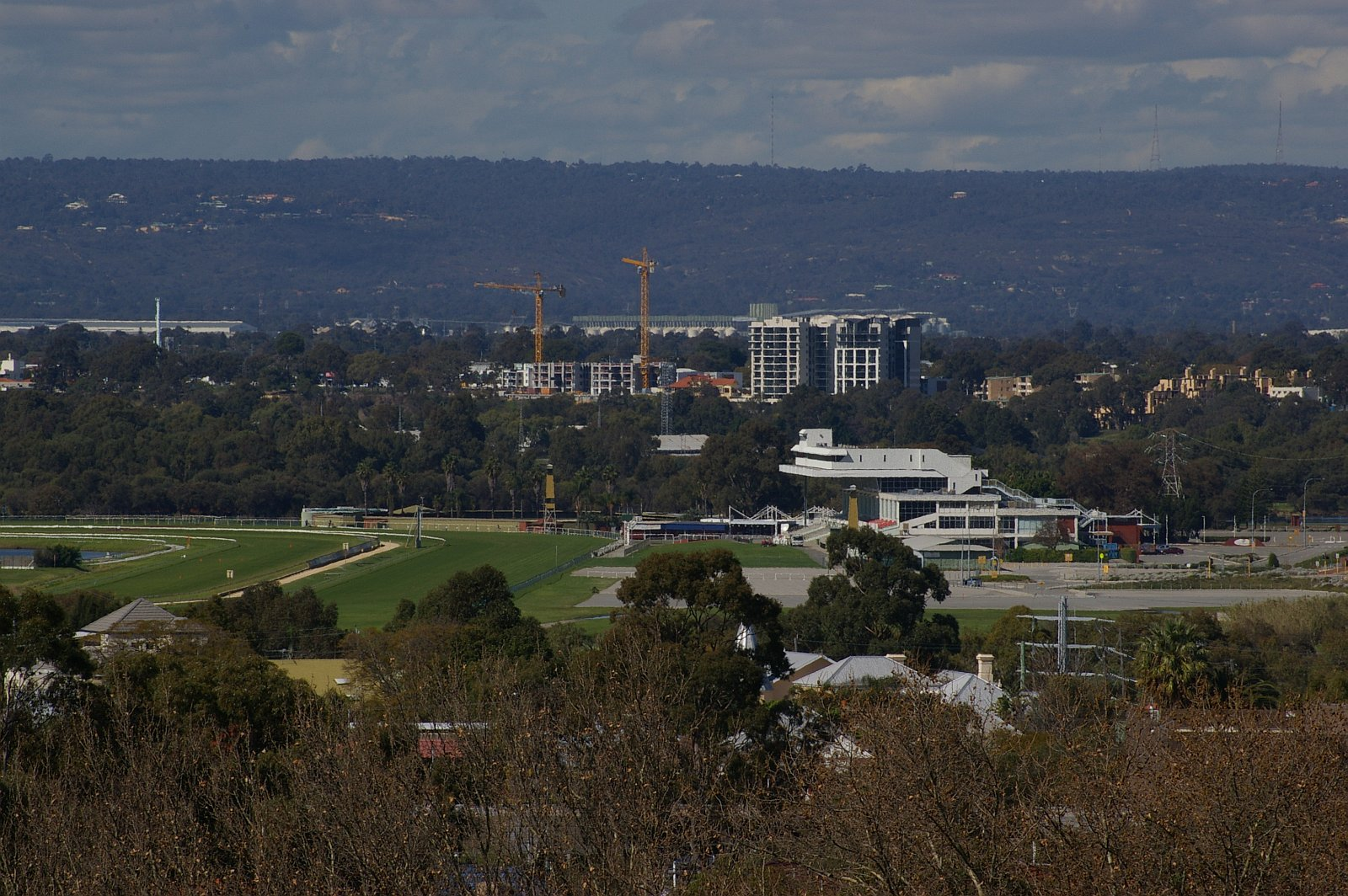
Belmont Park Race course, Perth's winter track

Racing in Western Australia is governed by Racing and Wagering Western Australia, which is a government-owned body. The main racing club, Western Australian Turf Club now known as Perth Racing, holds racing at Belmont Park and Ascot Racecourse. Other popular courses with feature races in Western Australia are Bunbury, Pinjarra, York, Geraldton, Albany, Kalgoorlie and Northam.

The most popular race is the Perth Cup, held each New Year's Day at Ascot. There are three Group One (G1) races contended, being the Railway Stakes, the Kingston Town Classic, and the Winterbottom Stakes.

=== Tasmania ===
Racing in Tasmania is governed by the Tasmanian Thoroughbred Racing Council and the principal club is the Tasmanian Turf Club. There are Tasmanian meetings every Sunday usually alternating between Elwick Racecourse near Hobart, Tasman Park near Launceston and Spreyton, Devonport. Race meetings also occur at the King Island Racing Club

=== Northern Territory ===
Racing in the Northern Territory is now governed by Thoroughbred Racing NT (formerly the Darwin Turf Club, which races at Fannie Bay.)

=== Australian Capital Territory ===
Racing in the Australian Capital Territory is governed by the principal club, the Canberra Racing Club.

== Betting ==
There are four main avenues for race betting in Australia. Licensed on-track bookmakers offer fixed-odds betting, mostly on wins and places. Off-track betting was traditionally controlled by the various state government through organisation called "Totalisator Agency Boards" (TAB), which offered mainly parimutuel betting - that is, the odds were not fixed but involved "the house" taking a fixed cut and distributing the remainder amongst people who made a winning bet. Many of these "TABs" have now been privatised, and many pubs now offer betting services linked to the privatised offshoots of the companies. In some parts of Australia there was a tradition of illegal off-course bookmaking, known as SP bookmaking. This became a large area of vice, intimately associated with police corruption and racetrack rigging. Several Royal Commissions investigated the practice, and there were many attempts to eradicate it. Once a common sight in suburban pubs and bars, the introduction of telephone and internet betting at fixed prices by licensed on-course bookmakers has made it largely redundant. Finally, there is online person to person exchange betting, where members set their own prices and pay a percentage of their winnings in commission.

In 1913 one of the major developments in race wagering, the automatic totalisator, which allowed the automatic calculation of race odds given betting patterns, was invented in Australia by George Julius (later Sir).

In recent years, corporate bookmakers operating online and through mobile apps have become increasingly popular through various specials, promotion and ease of use.

== Facts and figures for season 2008-09 ==
=== Group races ===
- Group 1 races: 67
- Group 2 races: 83
- Group 3 races: 110
- Listed races: 282
- Total of Black Type races: 542

=== Breeding ===
- Stallions: 840
- Mares: 28,134
- Live Foals: 16,113
- Gross Yearling Sales: A$245 million
- Median sale price: A$19,000
- Champion Sire: Encosta De Lago

=== Prize money and earnings ===
- Total Prize money: A$421 million
- Leading Prize money Earner: Viewed
- Total number of racehorses: 31,659
- Number of horses which earned over $100,000: 674
- Number of horses which earned less than $2,000: 22,300
- Number of horses with 4 or more wins: 634
- Number of horses with 0 wins: 19,579

=== Wagering ===
- Totalisator: $9,897 million
  - Win: 47.4%
  - Place: 15.7%
  - Trifecta: 16.3%
  - Quinella: 5.2%
  - Exacta: 2.6%
  - Doubles: 2.2%
  - Quadrella: 4.0%
  - Other: 6.5%
- Bookmakers: A$4,536 million

=== The season's winners ===
- Racehorse of the year: Scenic Blast
- Leading Trainer by Group wins: Gai Waterhouse
- Leading Trainer by wins: David A. Hayes
- Leading Jockey by Group wins: Nash Rawiller
- Leading Jockey by wins: Hugh Bowman

== Elite and black type racing in Australia ==
The Australian Pattern Racing Committee is responsible for grading races under the auspices of the Australian Racing Board. Traditionally, until the late 1970s, a series of stakes races were recognised as black type but there was no grading of races within this grouping. Historically, handicaps have been extremely popular among Australian punters, owners and industry participants. As a result, a large number of handicap races still exist within the list of group and listed races. Small efforts have been made to downgrade handicaps and promote set weights and weight for age races however the strength of fields that most handicaps attract make them better punting races than possible under even conditions.

As the largest racing country in the world, Australia has 66 of the world's 193 Group One races, recognised by the International Federation of Horseracing Authorities.

By tradition many state races have maintained higher gradings than they would otherwise be entitled to because of the poor quality of horses participating in them. The rapid growth in the Victorian and to a lesser extent, New South Wales racing carnivals has made the leading races of the other states less competitive in prize money and as a result prestige.

Given the self-interest of each state forming the Australian Racing Board, progress in properly grading races has been slow and controversy is often found in the decisions taken by the Pattern Racing Committee. In recent years, change has been occurring as the Pattern Racing Committee has taken a more scientific approach.

Criticism is also often made of a trend towards the promotion of sprint races over staying races. Many traditional staying races have been reduced in distance significantly over the last 30–40 years. Many parties have called for staying races to be given special dispensation in on-going reviews of race classifications to allow for a current lack of depth to encourage breeding and thus further depth in future.

The group 1 races (and selected other races) in Australia can generally be split into 3 groups, Australian races, state/city/track races and historically significant races.

=== National races ===
Australian Derby - AJC Easter Carnival - 2,400m - 3yo
Australian Oaks - AJC Easter Carnival - 2,400m - 3yo
Australian Cup - VRC Autumn Carnival - 2,000m - Open WFA
Australian Guineas - VRC Autumn Carnival - 1,600m - 3yo
Australia Stakes - Moonee Valley - 1,200m - Open
Australian Sires Produce Stakes - AJC Easter Carnival - 1,400 - 2yo

=== State/City/Track Races ===
==== Victorian races ====
Victoria Derby, Victoria Oaks, Victoria Sires Produce Stakes, Melbourne Cup, Caulfield Cup, Caulfield Guineas, 1000 Guineas, Caulfield Stakes, Moonee Valley Cup, Zipping Classic

==== New South Wales Races ====
Sydney Cup, Randwick Guineas, Rosehill Guineas, Storm Queen Stakes

==== Queensland Races ====
Queensland Derby, Queensland Oaks, Queensland Cup, QTC Sires Produce Stakes, Queensland Guineas, Brisbane Cup, Doomben Cup

==== South Australian Races ====
South Australian Derby, South Australian Oaks, SAJC Sires' Produce Stakes, Adelaide Cup, Port Adelaide Cup, Port Adelaide Guineas

==== Western Australian Races ====
WATC Derby, Perth Cup

=== Historically significant races ===
==== Victoria ====
W. S. Cox Plate, Newmarket Handicap, Blue Diamond Stakes, MRC Futurity Stakes C F Orr Stakes, Black Caviar Lightning, Manikato Stakes, Oakleigh Plate, Mackinnon Stakes, Sir Rupert Clarke Stakes, Underwood Stakes, Turnbull Stakes, VRC Classic, Myer Classic

==== New South Wales ====
Golden Slipper, Doncaster Handicap, Epsom Handicap, George Main Stakes, Metropolitan Handicap, Spring Champion Stakes, Flight Stakes, Chipping Norton Stakes, Coolmore Classic, Ranvet Stakes, Queen of the Turf Stakes, George Ryder Stakes, The BMW, All Aged Stakes, The Galaxy, TJ Smith Stakes, Queen Elizabeth Stakes, Champagne Stakes

==== Queensland ====
The T J Smith, BTC Cup, Doomben 10,000, Stradbroke Handicap, Winter Stakes

==== South Australia ====
Robert Sangster Stakes, Goodwood Handicap, Australasian Oaks

==== Western Australia ====
Railway Stakes, Kingston Town Classic

== See also ==
- Australian and New Zealand punting glossary
- Australian Champion Racehorse of the Year
- Australian Racing Hall of Fame
- List of Australian Group races
- Spring Grand Slam
- Thoroughbred racing in New Zealand
- Triple Crown of Thoroughbred Racing
