= Black Wednesday 1878 =

Political crisis in Melbourne, Australia

Black Wednesday was a political crisis in Melbourne, Victoria, Australia on 9 January 1878 when the Victorian Government, headed by the radical premier Graham Berry, dismissed around 300 public servants, including department heads, judges and senior officials, after the Legislative Council had failed to pass a government supply bill on the grounds that it included an expenditure item to extend the payment of members of parliament. Further sackings on 24 January brought the total number of people dismissed to nearly 400.

Black Wednesday was a high point in the broader struggle between the Berry ministry and the Legislative Council that gripped Victoria between 1877 and 1881. The dismissals were officially justified by the ministry on the grounds of financial exigency, but another motivation was the government's desire to penalise those in the public service who backed the intransigence of the Council. A compromise was eventually reached, and the extension of payments to members was passed by the Council in April 1879, as a separate piece of legislation.

Most of those who had been dismissed were subsequently reinstated, although Thomas Higinbotham was not. Henry Byron Moore, an Assistant Surveyor-General, turned to private business and became the long-serving and successful secretary of the Victorian Racing Club.
