= Arthur V. Kewney =

Arthur Vaux Kewney (1873 – 3 July 1956) was an Australian thoroughbred horseracing official, secretary of the Victoria Racing Club for 21 years.

== History ==
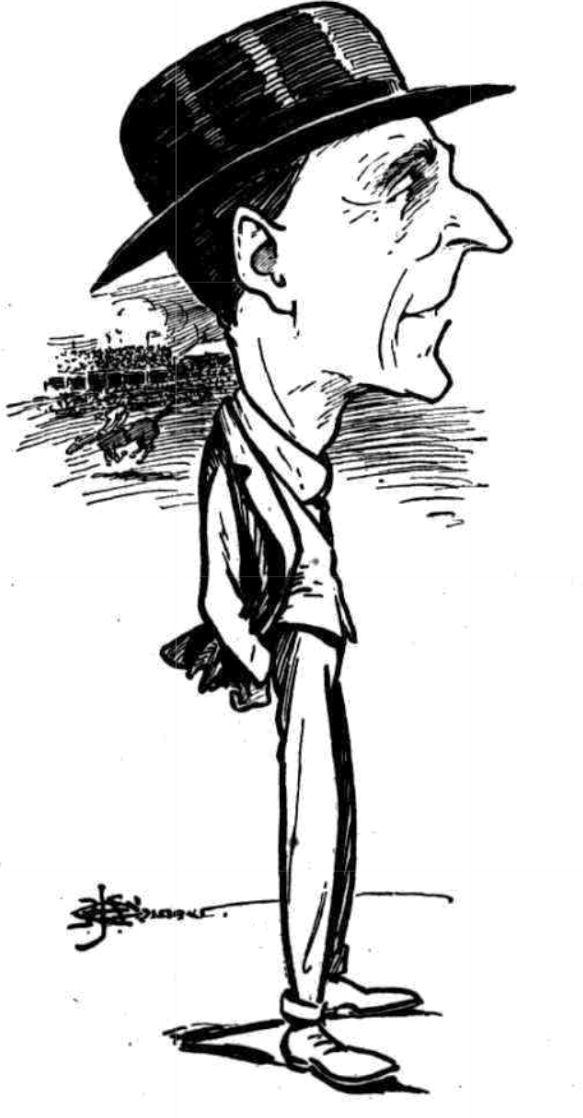
caricature by J. H. Chinner

Kewney was born in Cheshire, England, and served a five-year apprenticeship as clerk to a Liverpool cotton-broking firm. He left England to work as a clerk in Newfoundland and New Brunswick but returned home and found employment as a traveller for a firm of paint manufacturers. In 1896 he emigrated to Australia, and was employed by Phoenix Gold Mining Ltd. of Western Australia as manager and accountant.

He had always been interested in the turf, having memories as a lad in Liverpool of seeing Count Charles Kinsky on Zoedone winning the Grand National in 1883, and Voluptuary, ridden by E. P. Wilson, take the same race in 1884. With no prior experience he took on the job of secretary to the Kalgoorlie Racing Club, and was highly successful.

He was appointed secretary of the South Australian Jockey Club in 1919, as a successor to A. O. Whitington, and was responsible for changing Morphettville from a "burrow of conservatism" to a popular venue. Richer pastures lured however, and in June 1925 he was appointed secretary of the V.R.C. as a successor to H. Byron Moore, who retired in May 1925 after a 44-year career with the Club and died a month later.

He retired in 1946 at the age of 74.

Kewney was noted for his civility and good humor. He was a devotee of racing and followed the progress of horses and jockeys avidly, but was never tempted to lay a bet.

== Recognition ==
The A. V. Kewney Stakes, which has had several changes in grade and distance, was named for him.

== Family ==
Kewney married Emma Olga Bertha Hedemann (died in Adelaide 1971), only daughter of F. C. Hedemann of Coolgardie, Western Australia in Perth on 6 June 1900.

- Their son Everard Vaux Kewney (c. 1901–1971) was a student at Queen's College, North Adelaide. He was handicapper for SAJC from 1948.
