= Going (horse racing) =

Conditions of a horse racing track

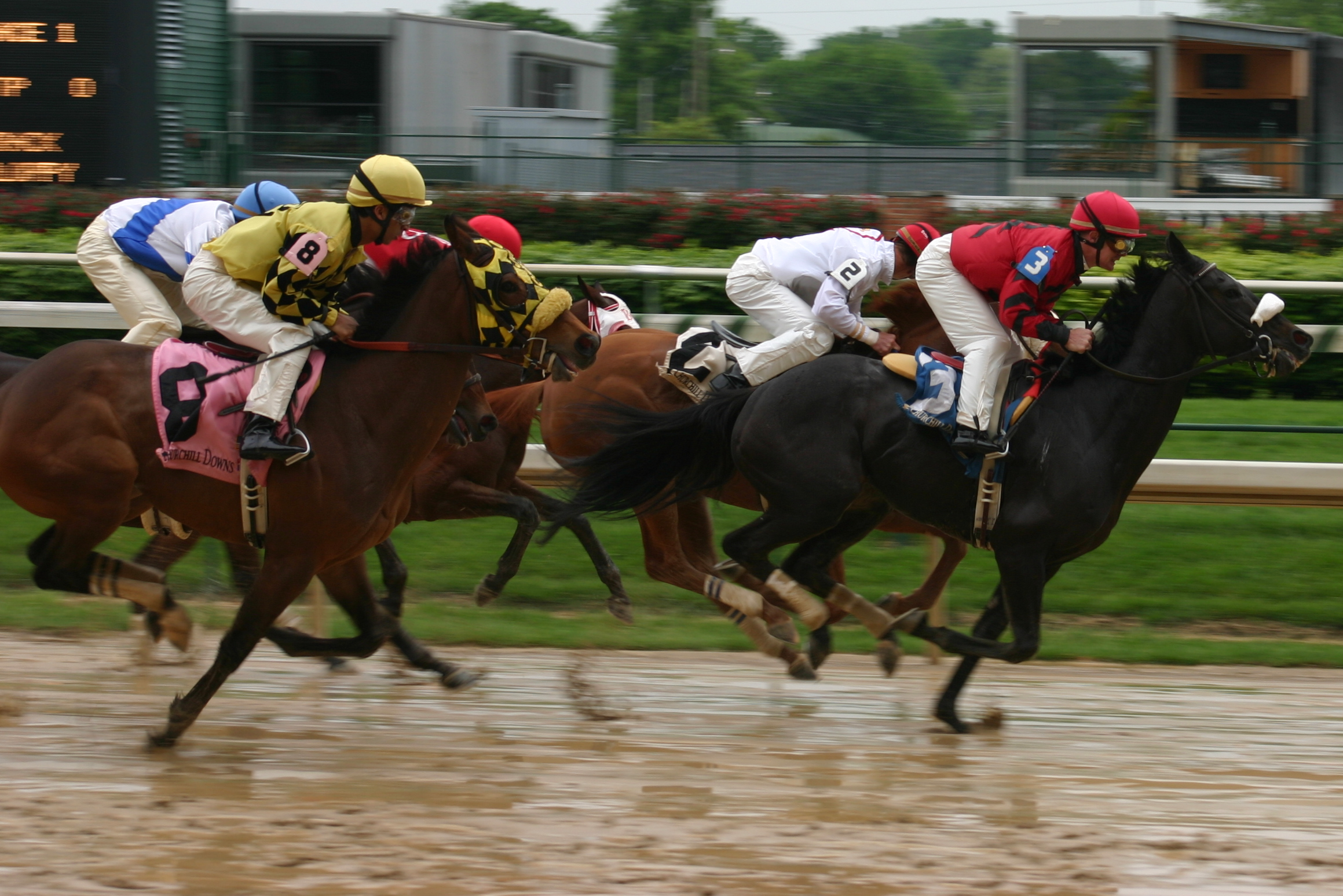
A sloppy racetrack in United States.

Going (UK), track condition (US) or track rating (AUS) are the track surface of a horse racing track prior to a horse race or race meet. The going is determined by the amount of moisture in the ground and is assessed by an official steward on the day of the race.

The condition of a race track plays an important role in the performance of horses in a race. The factors that go into determining race track condition include the surface conditions, type of surface, and track configuration. The surface conditions are influenced by the type of surface, factoring in soil type and whether the track is dirt, turf, or artificial surface, plus surface density, porosity, compaction, and moisture content.

== Australia ==
Prior to a race meeting, an inspection of the racecourse's surface is conducted by officials. This process consists of a visual inspection and the use of a tool called a penetrometer, which measures the soil's resistance to penetration. The inspection is conducted before the meeting to allow publication of the track rating for the benefit of punters and trainers. In the case of rain prior to a meeting, a much earlier inspection will be made to permit an early decision as to whether the meeting can proceed, before travelling horses depart for the meeting.

Tracks may be upgraded or downgraded while a race meeting is taking place. The main reasons for this is that sun/heat is able to dry out the track during the course of the day, possibly resulting in track upgrade, or that inclement weather and rain continues as the racing continues, which can result in a track downgrade. Jockeys, too, will be involved in inspections made during the meeting if there is any doubt as to the safety of riding on a downgraded or wet track.

On December 1, 2014, the Australian Racing Board (ARB) put into place a revised 10 point system using ratings from Firm 1 through to Heavy 10. The revised system removes the terms 'Fast', 'Dead', and 'Slow', replacing them with 'Firm' and 'Soft', while retaining the terms 'Good' and 'Heavy'.

Below are the official ratings recognised by all race clubs in Australia:

- Firm 1: Dry hard track
- Firm 2: Firm track with reasonable grass coverage
- Good 3: Track with good grass coverage and cushion
- Good 4: Track with some give in it
- Soft 5: Track with a reasonable amount of give in it
- Soft 6: Moist but not a badly affected track
- Soft 7: More rain-affected track that will chop out
- Heavy 8: Rain affected track that horses will sink into
- Heavy 9: Wet track getting into a squelchy area
- Heavy 10: Heaviest category track, very wet, towards saturation

Additionally, a rating of AWT is used to signify an All Weather Track, which equates to a Good (4) surface under some bad weather conditions.

== United Kingdom and Ireland ==
In the UK and Ireland there are seven grades of surface, which are:

- hard
- firm
- good to firm
- good
- good to soft
- soft
- heavy

Since 2009, in addition to the official description of the going, British racecourses are required to report penetrometer readings on the day of the race. A penetrometer designed by Cranfield University and TurfTrax, known as the 'GoingStick', is used for these measurements. The 'hard' grade is rarely used, as a racetrack with this type of surface is generally deemed to be dangerous to both horses and jockeys. No races took place on tracks rated as 'hard going' between 2008 and 2013.

In Ireland the term "yielding" is used for "good to soft" going.

For artificial surfaces in the UK the official grades are:

- fast
- standard to fast
- standard
- standard to slow
- slow

== United States ==
In the United States, different systems are used for turf racetracks and dirt tracks. Artificial surfaces (called all-weather tracks in official charts) use the dirt track rating system.

For dirt tracks the track conditions are:

- fast: dry, even, resilient surface
- wet fast: occurs immediately after a heavy rain. Track has surface water on it, but base is still solid. Times are similar to, or sometimes faster than, a fast track.
- good: a track that is almost fast
- muddy: a track that is wet but has no standing water
- sloppy: a track saturated with water with standing water visible
- slow: a track wet on both the surface and base
- sealed: a track surface that has been packed down. A sealed dry track allows water to run off the track, reducing the amount of precipitation absorbed. Wet tracks are sealed to provide a safe and even racing surface

For turf tracks, the track conditions are:

- firm: a firm, resilient surface
- good: a turf course slightly softer than firm
- yielding: a turf course with a significant amount of "give" to the ground due to recent rain
- soft: a turf course with a large amount of moisture. Horses sink very deeply into it.
- heavy: wettest possible condition of a turf course; not usually found in North America
