= Red Roses Stakes =

- Class: Group 3
- Location: Flemington Racecourse, Melbourne, Australia
- Inaugurated: 1983
- Race type: Thoroughbred
- Sponsor: Crown (2025 & 2026)

Race information
- Distance: 1,100 metres
- Surface: Turf
- Qualification: Three year old fillies
- Weight: Set weights with penalties
- Purse: $300,000 (2026)

The Red Roses Stakes is a registered Victoria Racing Club Group 3 Thoroughbred horse race for three-year-old fillies, run under set weights with penalties conditions, over 1,100 metres at Flemington Racecourse, Melbourne, Australia during the VRC Spring Carnival on Crown Oaks Day.

== History ==
=== Name ===
- 1983–1993 - Red Roses Stakes
- 1994–2002 - Cadbury Roses Stakes
- 2003 - Aquaveta Stakes
- 2004 - Schweppes Agrum' Stakes
- 2005–2006 - Schweppervescence Stakes
- 2007 - Cadbury Eden Stakes
- 2008 - Cadbury Roses Stakes
- 2009 - TCL Electronics Stakes
- 2010–2011 - Gucci Stakes
- 2012–2013 - Gucci Icons of Heritage Stakes
- 2014–2015 - Gucci Stakes
- 2016 - Crown Resorts Plate
- 2017–2018 - Kennedy Plate
- 2018 - World Horse Racing Roses Stakes
- 2019 - Red Roses Stakes

=== Grade ===
- 1983–2013 - Listed Race
- 2014 onwards - Group 3

=== Distance ===
- 1983–2013 - 1200 metres
- 2014 onwards - 1100 metres

== Winners ==
- 2026 - Lady Catalina
- 2025 - Point Barrow
- 2024 - Amelita
- 2023 - Mumbai Muse
- 2022 - Aitch Two Oh
- 2021 - Flying Evelyn
- 2020 - Written Beauty
- 2019 - Sisstar
- 2018 - Bleu Roche
- 2017 - Jorda
- 2016 - Spright
- 2015 - Secret Agenda
- 2014 - Onemorezeta
- 2013 - Melrose Place
- 2012 - Shamal Wind
- 2011 - Emmalene
- 2010 - Curtana
- 2009 - Trim
- 2008 - Exalted Keetah
- 2007 - Gamble Me
- 2006 - Gold Edition
- 2005 - Crevette
- 2004 - Tahni Girl
- 2003 - Danabaa
- 2002 - Red Labelle
- 2001 - The Big Chill
- 2000 - Wyndam Special
- 1999 - Faithful Love
- 1998 - Isca
- 1997 - Dantelah
- 1996 - Chalee
- 1995 - Laudemio
- 1994 - Princess D'Or
- 1993 - Bislotto
- 1992 - Gatana
- 1991 - In The Bahamas
- 1990 - Wrap Around
- 1989 - Perfect Evening
- 1988 - Blixen
- 1987 - Open To Offers
- 1986 - Lucky Witch
- 1985 - Goodwood Lady
- 1984 - Weigh
- 1983 - Nouvelle Star

== See also ==
- Crown Oaks
- List of Australian Group races
- Group races
