= Australian Stud Book =

Thoroughbred horse breeding registry

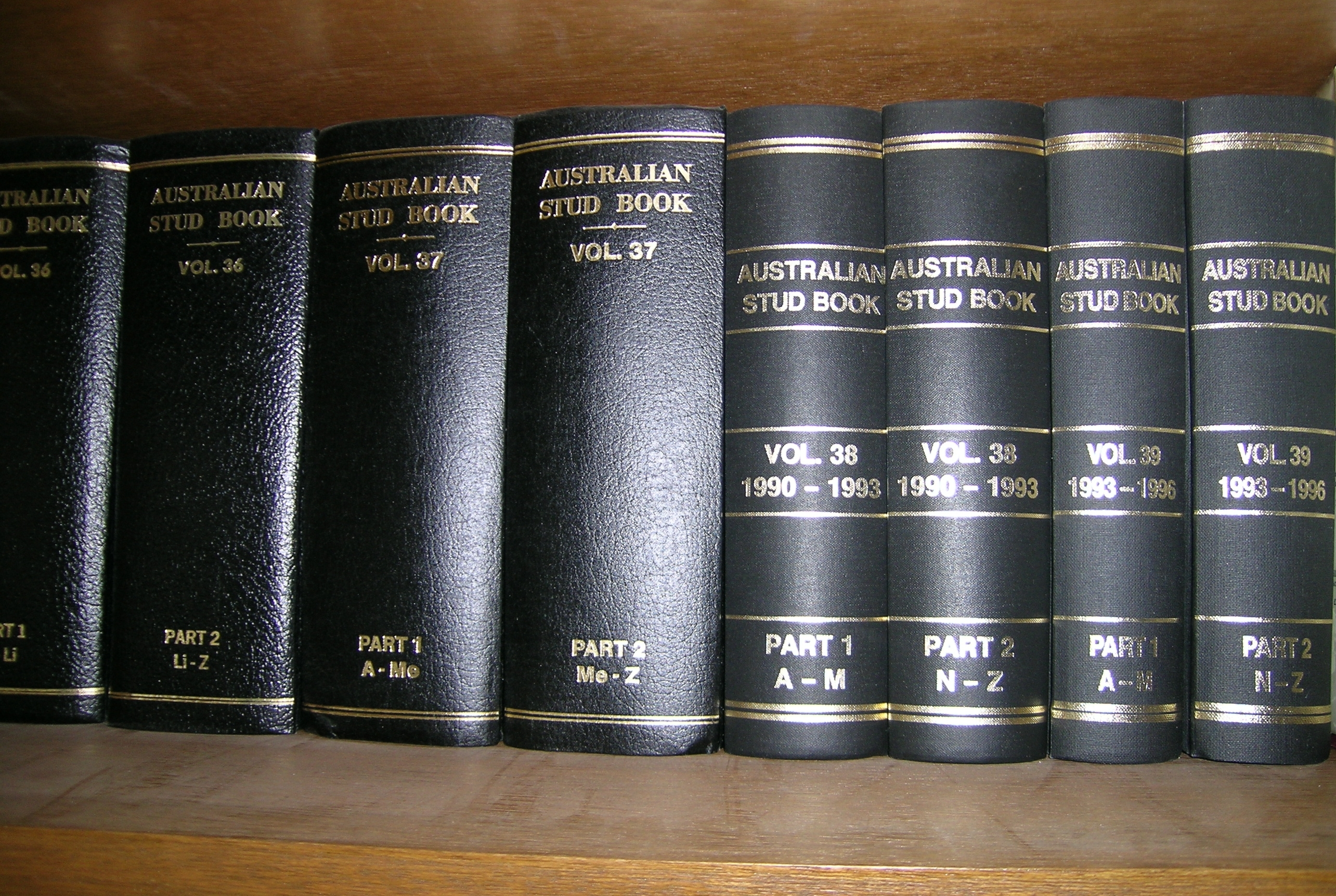
Some Australian Stud Books.

The Australian Stud Book (ASB), is the body responsible for ensuring the integrity of Thoroughbred breeding in Australia. Australia is the second-largest Thoroughbred breeding country in the world behind the US. The principal functions of the ASB include identification procedures along with DNA testing of mares and foals and the recording of a mare’s progeny and stallion statistics. In 2003 the ASB introduced microchips for foals, which is the most secure means of horse identification when and combined with freeze branding, provides racing officials with the most dependable identification system in the world.

The ASB regularly produces printed Stud Books. These books are now over 3,000 pages, with volume 42 of the ASB containing the breeding records of 43,000 mares and 70,000 of their named offspring. The ASB also controls the comprehensive online database which contains the records of over 860,000 horses. This database includes every Australian foal born since 1972 and includes 28,000 winners of major races in Australia and around the world. Basic horse information is free, but there is subscription access to the Stud Book website where extensive data is available for a modest fee.

== History ==
The Stud Book of New South Wales by Fowler Boyd Price was published in 1859, and was the first official attempt to document the pedigrees of the colony's bloodhorses. The Victorian Stud Book was then published in Volumes 1-2 which were edited by William Levey to the year 1864 and volumes 3-4 edited by William Cross Yuille to the year 1874. The Australian Stud Book (ASB) began in 1878 as a private venture by A. & William C. Yuille, Melbourne bloodstock agents who published nine volumes. New Zealand horses were included in the ASB until Volume VII appeared in 1900. The copyright was sold in 1910 to the Australian Jockey Club (AJC) and the Victoria Racing Club (VRC), who now administer matters concerning the breeding of Thoroughbred racehorses.

In the 1880s it was decided that all Thoroughbreds foaled in Australia and New Zealand should have their official ages calculated from 1 August.

Similar world stud books give one another more or less complete reciprocation. Exceptions to this include the following early Colonial mares which did not trace to the General Stud Book (GSB), but are accepted by the ASB owing to the performances of their progeny:

- Cutty Sark (imp.)
- Adeline by Kingston
- Belhari by Indian Warrior
- Betty by Hector
- Black Swan by Yattendon
- Contessa by Gemma di Vergy
- Dinah by Gratis
- Empress by Tamerlane
- Gipsy by Rons' Emigrant
- Heris by Gemma di Vergy
- Lilla by New Chum
- Myrtle by Gemma di Vergy
- Sappho by Marquis
- Steeltrap Mare by Steeltrap
- Yatterina by Yattendon
- Young English Mare by Bay Camerton

Some mares that were included in the American Stud Book are exempt. If satisfactorily certificated, they may be admitted with the affix "(Am)."

Racehorses must be registered to race, but do not have to be purebred Thoroughbreds in order to be registered and race in Australia. Prior to 1980 it was not uncommon to see a country racehorse registered as "by an unidentified sire out of a station mare". During 1980 it was regulated that horses without registered parents could not be officially named. Several thousand non-stud book mares are also served throughout Australia each year by eligible stud book sires. The resulting live foals are not eligible for entry into the Australian Stud Book, but may be registered as racehorses and to permitted to compete in nearly all races on the Australian turf calendar except for several classics, semi-classics and set-weight races.

The Australian Stud Book was a founding member of the International Stud Book Committee. These nine world stud book authorities meet annually to establish standards of Stud Book operation that will ensure integrity and further development. This committee also works to:

- establish criteria for promotion to Thoroughbred status, via vehicle mares and stallions
- assist in operating and maintaining a Thoroughbred Stud Book,
- oversee the breeding and identification of Thoroughbred horses,
- assist the movement of Thoroughbreds between Stud Book Authorities etc.

The Australian Stud Book and all other Thoroughbred stud books ban artificial insemination and embryo transfer in Thoroughbred mares.

The Australian Stud Book assists with research and promotion of Thoroughbreds by making large grants to Thoroughbred Breeders Australia. An annual scholarship is available to students in the Diploma of Horse Business Management which is supported by the ASB.

In September 2014 the Australian Racing Board announced it would merge with the Australian Stud Book and Racing Information Services Australia to form a new national body to administer thoroughbred racing, to be called Racing Australia. The announcement confirmed that the Stud Book would retain its own identity.

== See also ==
- General Stud Book
- Thoroughbred racing
- Thoroughbred racing in Australia
