= A. O. Whitington =

Businessman and sportsman in Australia

Arthur Onslow Whitington (1858 – 14 May 1919), generally known as A. O. Whitington or simply "A.O.", was a businessman and sportsman in South Australia, the highly regarded founding secretary of the revived South Australian Jockey Club, serving from 1888 to 1919.

Arthur was born in Adelaide, a member of the influential Whitington family. His father, William Smallpeice Whitington, came to South Australia in his own ship, the New Holland, loaded with merchandise including the colony's first thoroughbred stallion, arriving in July 1840. Arthur and several of his brothers were educated at J. L. Young's Adelaide Educational Institution, and Arthur was early employed at Barnard & Co.'s horse bazaar on Currie Street, then served as accountant to the Pile Brothers who also had offices on Currie Street.

In 1883 Parliament passed the Totalizator Repeal Act, which had the immediate effect of making race-courses much less profitable, and the old South Australian Jockey Club, whose finances were in a precarious state, was forced to relinquish the Morphettville racecourse to the Queensland Mortgage Company. The 1885 Adelaide Cup was, farcically, held at Flemington and the club was defunct. In 1888 Whitington, who had previously had a supervisory role at race meetings, and whose employers John and William Pile were prominent racegoers, was approached by T. F. Wigley to help revive the club, and Whitington convened a meeting in the arbitration room of the Stock Exchange in Pirie street on 19 September 1888, presided by Sir Richard Baker. The outcome of the meeting was that Whitington as club secretary, and a committee of seven (which included Sir Richard, W. B. "Ben" Rounsevell, T. F. Wigley and William Pile) were appointed, and the Morphettville course, which had been purchased by T. F. Wigley, Sylvester Browne, and R. B. Pell for £8,000, speculating on a resumption of racing, would be leased by the Club for £900 per annum with a right to purchase after four years for £12,000. The racing editor of The Register wrote at the time:

"Without doubt this gentleman is the most suitable man in the colony to fill the office. He has a most thorough knowledge of the duties of a racing Secretary, while he also understands all the details connected with the working of the totalizator. Mr. Whitington is not an extravagant manager by any means, and there is no fear of the new club incurring heavy liabilities at the outset of its career."

The writer proved correct: largely due to Whitington's scrupulous management, the SAJC was able in 1895 to exercise its "right to purchase" from Browne, who had in the interim acquired Pell's then Wigley's shares.

Whitington had few interests outside his involvement with horse racing apart from canary breeding and his family — he was married with four daughters and two sons. His two eldest daughters, Sylvia and Clytie Whitington, were highly respected musicians. They had a home in Glenelg.

His successor at Morphettville was Arthur V. Kewney, previously secretary to the Kalgoorlie Racing Club.

== Family ==
- Arthur Onslow Whitington (1858 – 14 May 1919) married Evelyn Amelia Gason ( – 20 May 1941) on 31 March 1877. Their children included:

- Mabel Maud Whitington (1878–1882)
- Hilda Maria/Marie? Whitington (1880–1969)
- Harold Valentine Whitington (1883– )
- Clytie Myrtle Whitington AMUA (1885 – 17 May 1954) was an accomplished pianist; the sisters often appeared in concert together.
- Sylvia Muriel Whitington AMUA (1887 – 27 January 1944) was a noted violinist and orchestra leader She married Adelaide Conservatorium pianist George Mayo Pearce (1892–1975) on 15 December 1927.
- Gladys Ruby Whitington (1890– )
- Edgar Augustine Whitington (1892– )

Arthur Onslow Whitington (1884–1921), a prominent South Australian teacher, was a nephew, son of William Smallpeice Whitington.
