= Melbourne Telephone Exchange Company =

The Melbourne Telephone Exchange Company operated Australia's first telephone exchange. The exchange was located at 367 Collins Street, and commenced operation in August 1880. H. Byron Moore was a founder and its first manager; W. H. Masters and T. T. Draper were the owners of the company. It later became the Victorian Telephone Exchange Company and remained in private ownership until 1887, when it was bought out by the Victorian Colonial Government. In the first year it had 23 subscribers but by 1887 that number had grown to 887.

James Trackson, an electrical engineer, trained at the London Polytechnic, was sent out to install the Melbourne Telephone Exchange. He arrived on the Copernicus in December 1883. He was 25 years of age. James Trackson was the son of James Trackson and Elizabeth and was born in December 1857 at Heigham, Norwich and died 6 November 1941 in Toowoomba. Later he was engaged by the Queensland Government for two years to assist in erecting Brisbane's first exchange. In 1885 he and his brother William founded Trackson Brothers, an important early electrical firm in Brisbane. Many photos of his life are available including his early automobiles.
