= Crown Oaks =

Crown Oaks registered as VRC Oaks
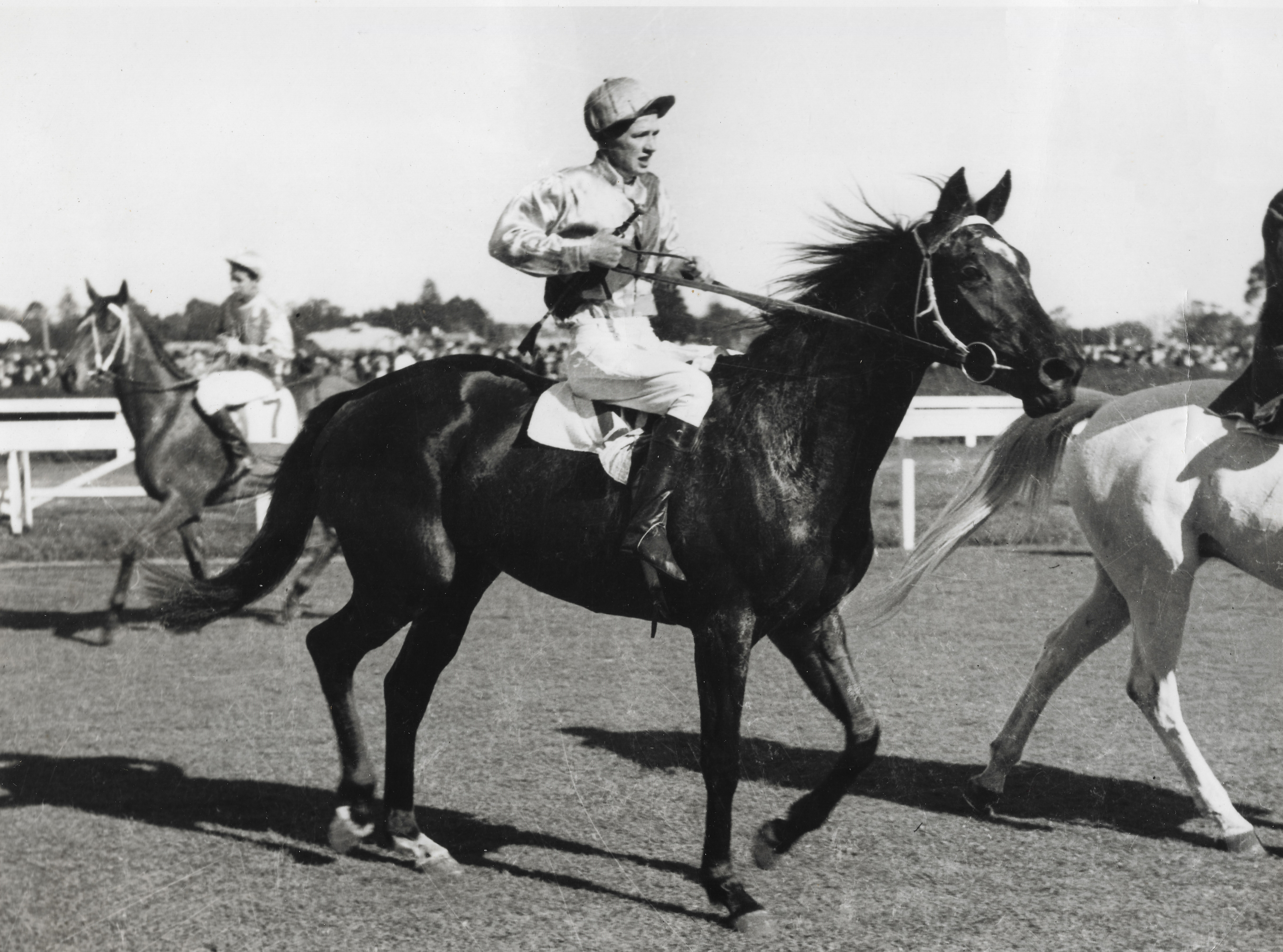
- Chicquita, 1949 winner
- Class: Group 1
- Location: Flemington Racecourse, Melbourne, Australia
- Inaugurated: 1861; 165 years ago
- Race type: Thoroughbred
- Sponsor: Crown (2024 -2026)

Race information
- Distance: 2,500 metres
- Surface: Turf
- Qualification: Three year old fillies
- Weight: Set weights – 55½ kilograms
- Purse: $1,000,000 (2026)

The Victoria Racing Club Oaks (known as the Crown Oaks for sponsorship reasons), is a Victoria Racing Club (VRC) Group 1 Thoroughbred horse race for three-year-old fillies, run under set weights conditions, over 2,500 metres at Flemington Racecourse, Melbourne, Australia on the third day of the VRC Spring Carnival, the Thursday after the Melbourne Cup in early November.

== History ==
Record attendance for the race day was set in 2004 with 110,677 in attendance.

=== 1950 and 1952 racebooks ===
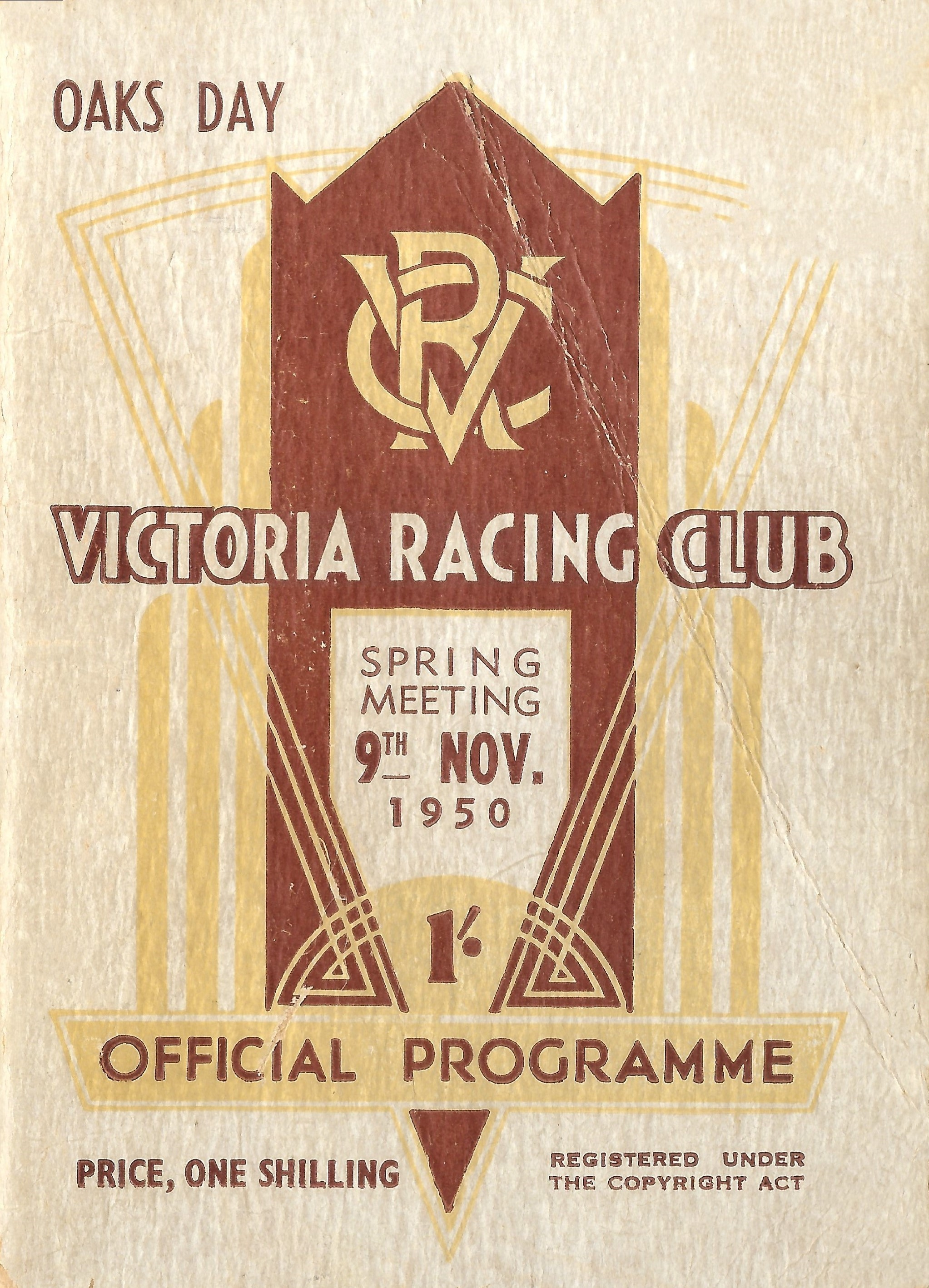
1950 VRC Oaks Stakes racebook front cover

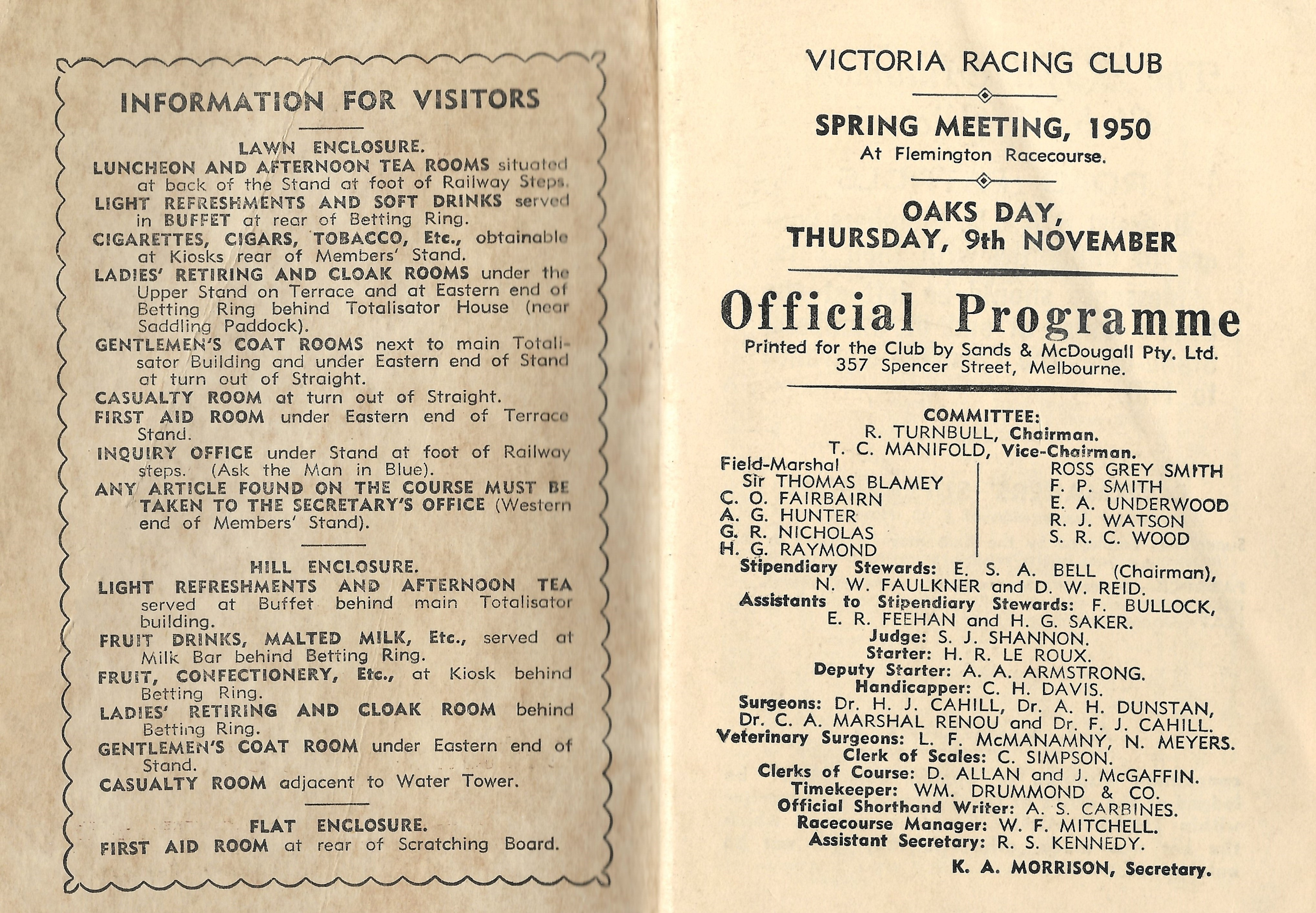
1950 VRC Oaks Stakes raceday officials

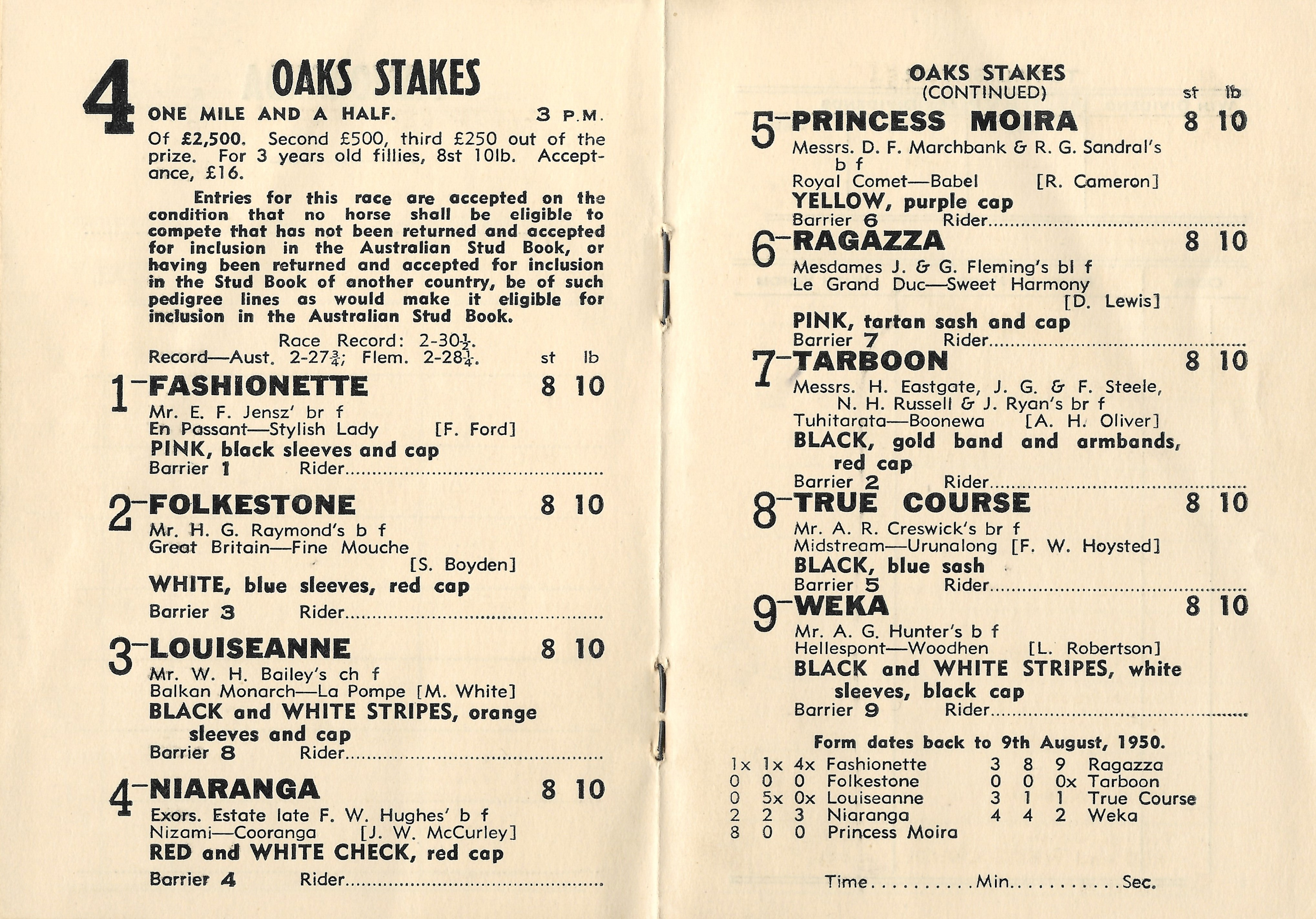
1950 VRC Oaks Stakes winner, True Course

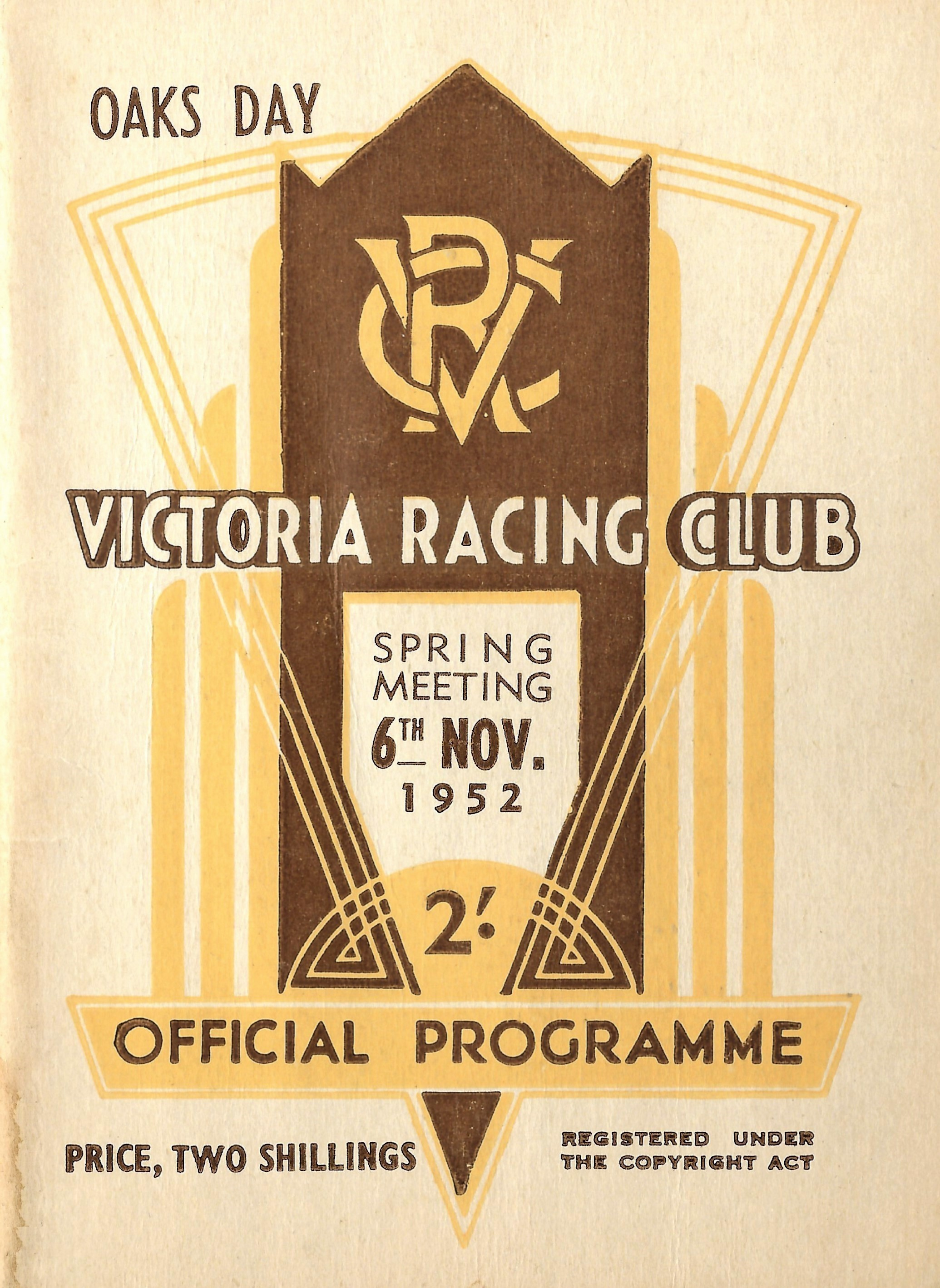
1952 VRC Oaks Stakes racebook front cover

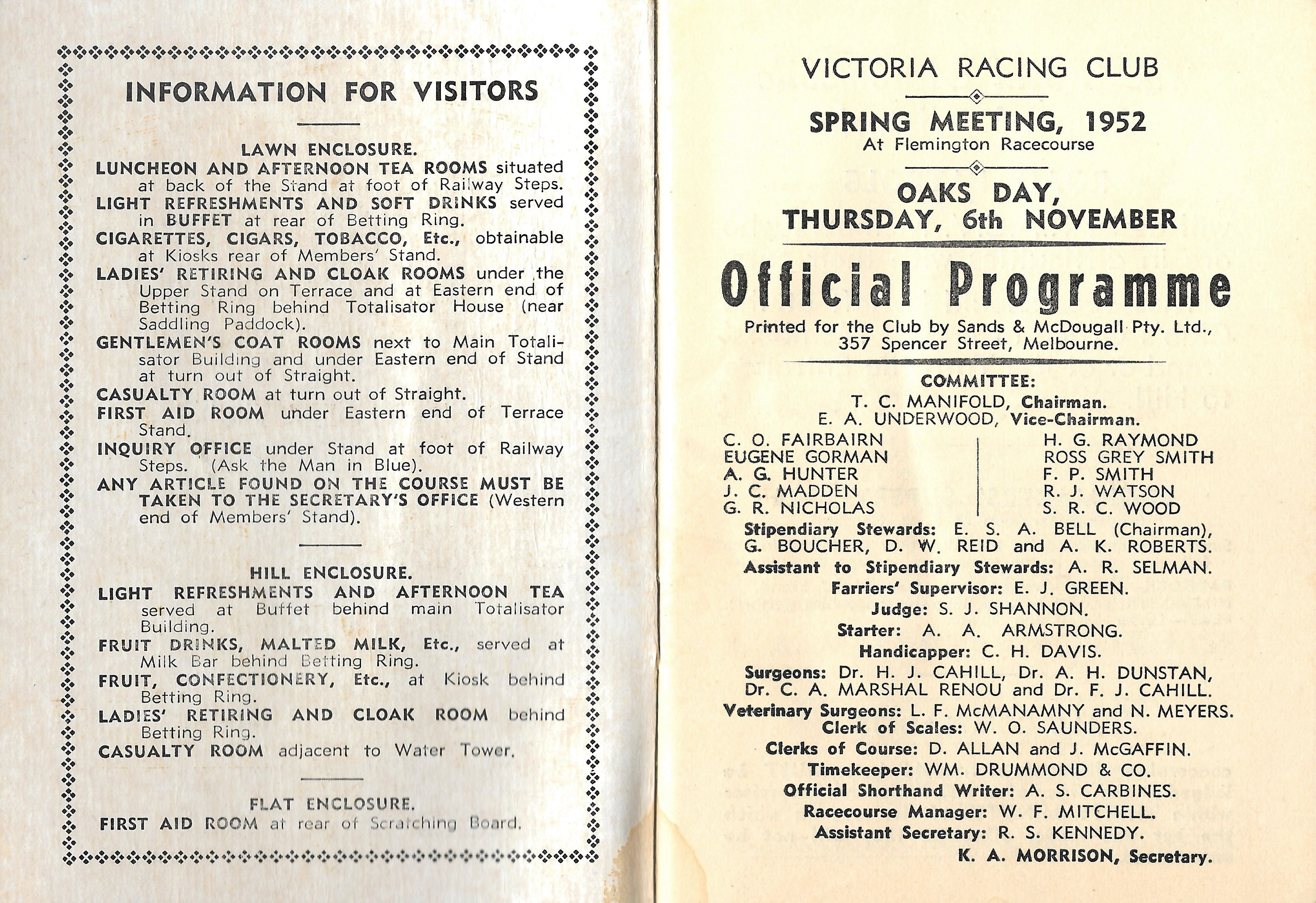
1952 VRC Oaks Stakes raceday officials

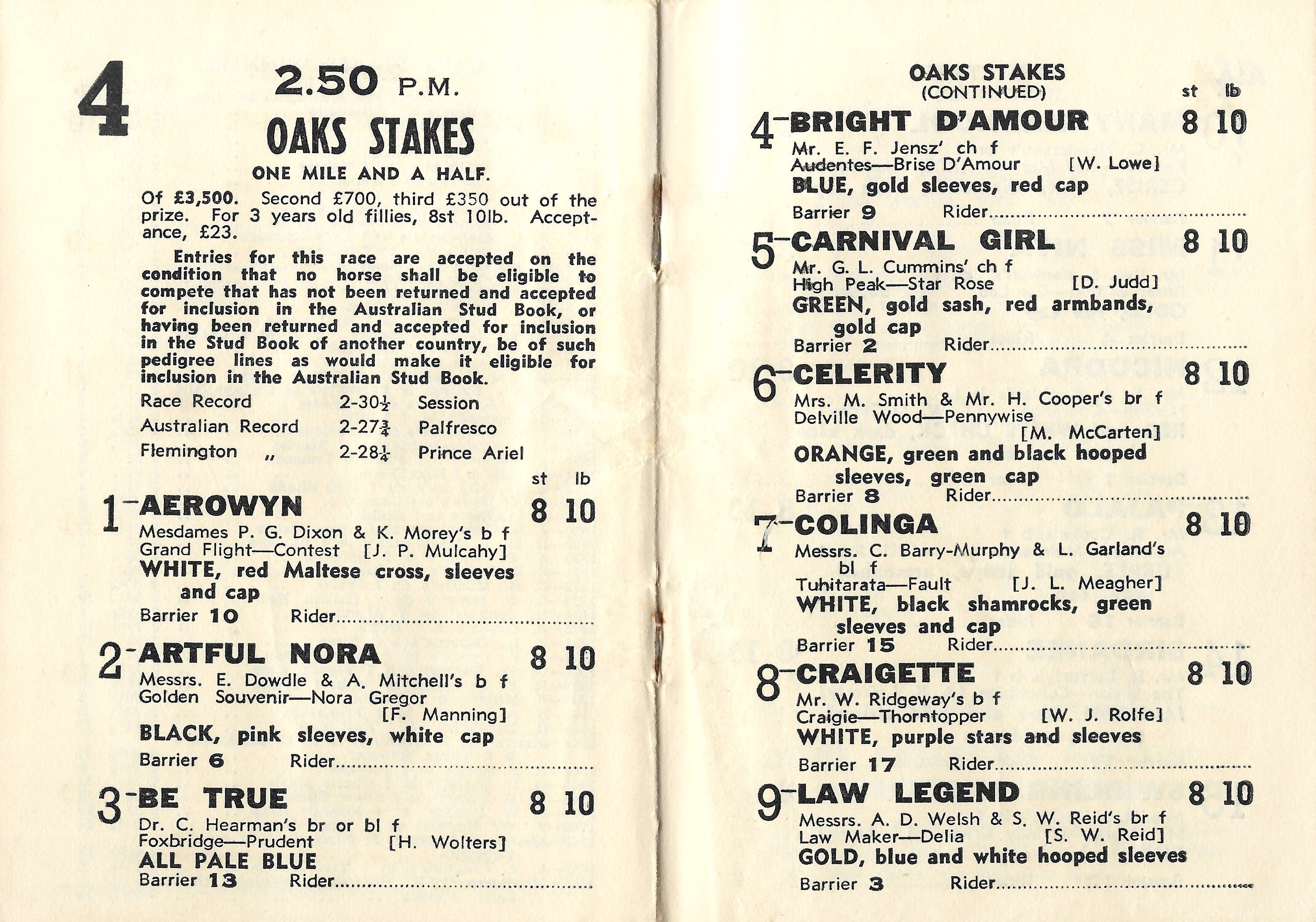
1952 VRC Oaks Stakes starters and results

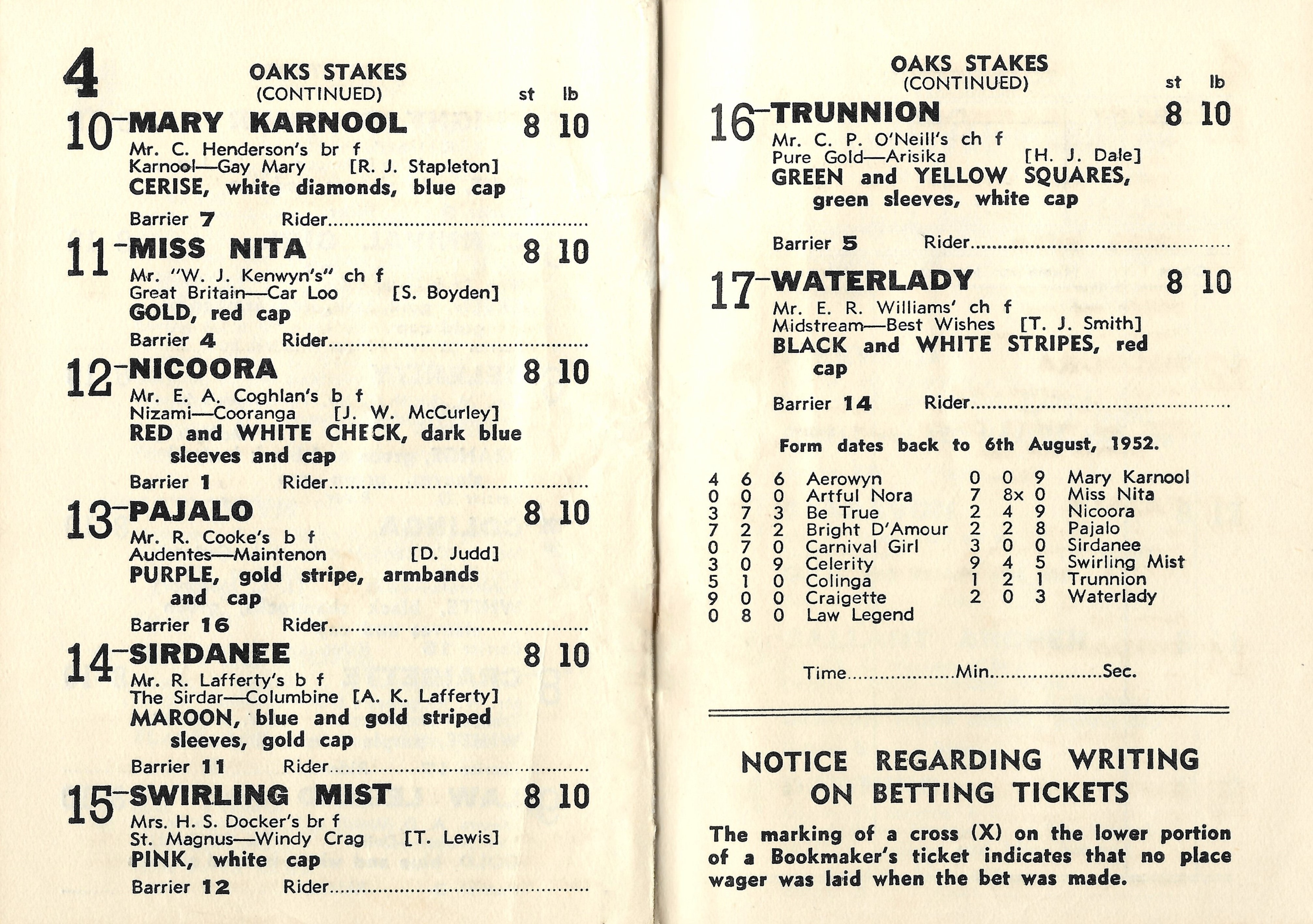
1952 VRC Oaks Stakes showing the winner, Waterlady

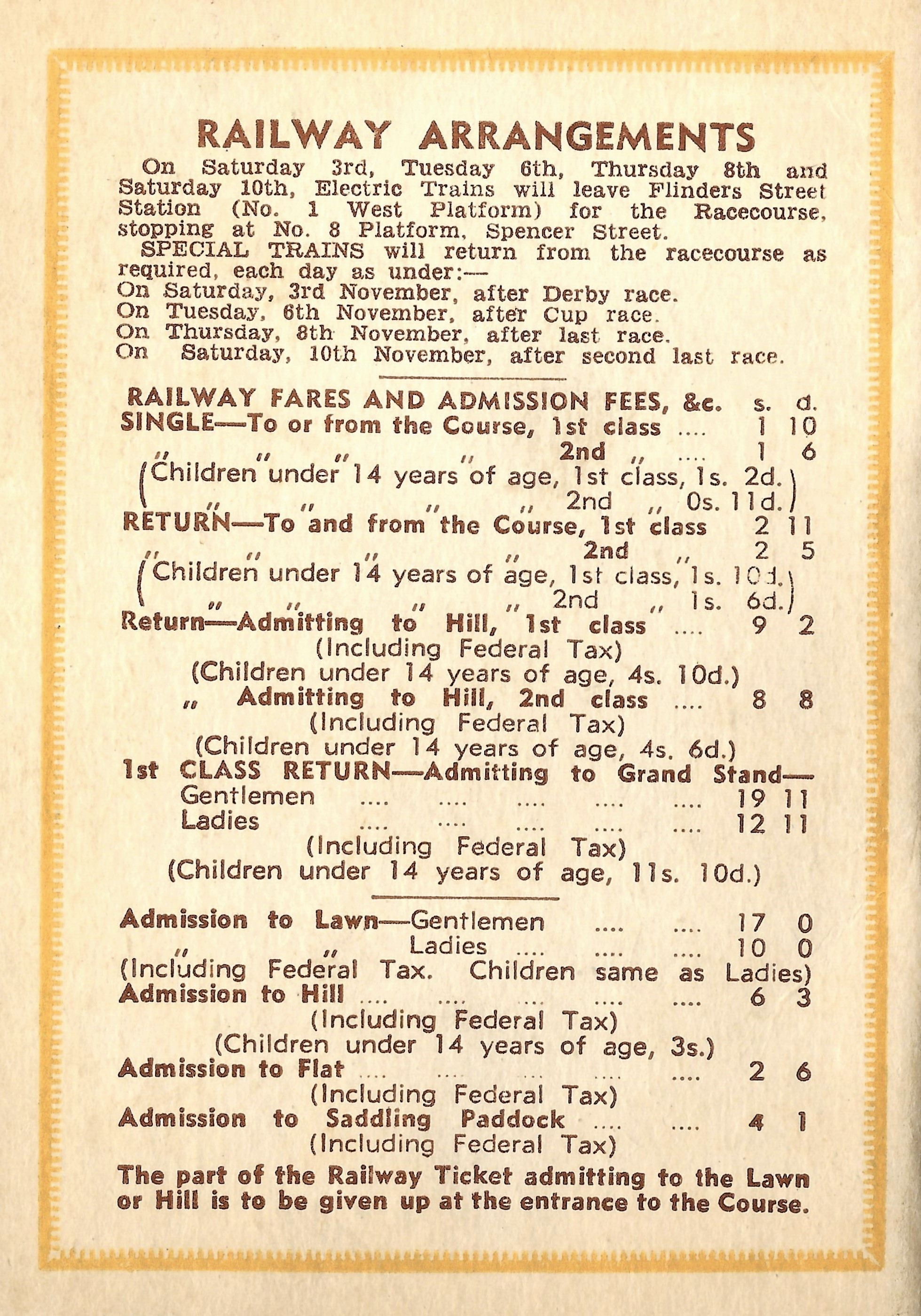
Back page showing railway arrangements and charges at the entrance gates

=== Name ===
- 1861–1993 – VRC Oaks
- 1994–2016 – Crown Oaks
- 2017–2023 – Kennedy Oaks
- 2024 onwards – Crown Oaks

=== Distance ===
- 1861–1971 – 1 1/2 miles (~2400 metres)
- 1972 – 2400 metres
- 1973 onwards – 2500 metres

=== Grade ===
- 1855–1978 – Principal Race
- 1979 onwards – Group 1

== Winners ==
The following are past winners of the race.

- 1861 – Palestine
- 1862 – Modesty
- 1863 – Aruma
- 1864 – Illumination
- 1865 – Lady Heron
- 1866 – Sea Gull
- 1867 – Sylvia
- 1868 – My Dream
- 1869 – Kestrel
- 1870 – Florence
- 1871 – Formosa
- 1872 – Sunshine
- 1873 – Rose D'amour
- 1874 – Gaslight
- 1875 – Maid Of All Work
- 1876 – Briseis
- 1877 – Pardon
- 1878 – Melita
- 1879 – Petrea
- 1880 – Sapphire
- 1881 – Royal Maid
- 1882 – Vaucluse
- 1883 – Quality
- 1884 – Venetia
- 1885 – Uralla
- 1886 – The Nun
- 1887 – Dainty
- 1888 – Pearlshell
- 1889 – Spice
- 1890 – Litigant
- 1891 – Tiraillerie
- 1892 – Etra Weenie
- 1893 – The Dauphine
- 1894 – Regina
- 1895 – Auraria
- 1896 – Thunder Queen
- 1897 – Eleusive
- 1898 – Symmetry
- 1899 – Nitre
- 1900 – Haulette
- 1901 – Beanba
- 1902 – Fishery
- 1903 – Sweet Nell
- 1904 – Red Streak
- 1905 – Lady Wallace
- 1906 – Yabba Gabba
- 1907 – Lady Rylstone
- 1908 – Nushka
- 1909 – Lady San
- 1910 – Styria
- 1911 – Wilari
- 1912 – Moe
- 1913 – Mint Sauce
- 1914 – Carlita
- 1915 – Rosanna
- 1916 – Thana
- 1917 – Folly Queen
- 1918 – Stagegirl
- 1919 – Hyades
- 1920 – Mufti
- 1921 – Furious
- 1922 – Scarlet
- 1923 – Frances Tressady
- 1924 – Miss Disraeli
- 1925 – Redshank
- 1926 – Lanson
- 1927 – Ninbela
- 1928 – Opera Queen
- 1929 – Lineage
- 1930 – Barbette
- 1931 – Gallantic
- 1932 – Protea
- 1933 – Golden Hair
- 1934 – Alinura
- 1935 – Nalda
- 1936 – Siren
- 1937 – Prairie Moon
- 1938 – French Gem
- 1939 – Triode
- 1940 – Session
- 1941 – Primavera
- 1942 – East End
- 1943 – Three Wheeler
- 1944 – Provoke
- 1945 – Cherie Marie
- 1946 – Sweet Chime
- 1947 – Nizam's Ring
- 1948 – Grey Nurse
- 1949 – Chicquita
- 1950 – True Course
- 1951 – Lady Havers
- 1952 – Waterlady
- 1953 – Waltzing Lady
- 1954 – Lady Mogambo
- 1955 – Evening Peal
- 1956 – Innesfell
- 1957 – Amarco
- 1958 – Chicola
- 1959 – Mintaway
- 1960 – Lady Sybil
- 1961 – Indian Summer
- 1962 – Arctic Star
- 1963 – Jingle Bells
- 1964 – Light Fingers
- 1965 – Gipsy Queen
- 1966 – Farmer's Daughter
- 1967 – Chosen Lady
- 1968 – Double Steel
- 1969 – Goliette
- 1970 – Sanderae
- 1971 – Kiss Me Cait
- 1972 – Toltrice
- 1973 – Bonnybel
- 1974 – Leica Show
- 1975 – Denise's Joy
- 1976 – Surround
- 1977 – Show Ego
- 1978 – Scomeld
- 1979 – Brava Jeannie
- 1980 – November Rain
- 1981 – Rose Of Kingston
- 1982 – Rom's Stiletto
- 1983 – Taj Eclipse
- 1984 – Spirit Of Kingston
- 1985 – My Tristram's Belle
- 1986 – Diamond Shower
- 1987 – Sandy's Pleasure
- 1988 – Research
- 1989 – Tristanagh
- 1990 – Weekend Delight
- 1991 – Richfield Lady
- 1992 – Slight Chance
- 1993 – Arborea
- 1994 – Northwood Plume
- 1995 – Saleous
- 1996 – My Brightia
- 1997 – Kensington Palace
- 1998 – Grand Archway
- 1999 – Tributes
- 2000 – Lovelorn
- 2001 – Magical Miss
- 2002 – Bulla Borghese
- 2003 – Special Harmony
- 2004 – Hollow Bullet
- 2005 – Serenade Rose
- 2006 – Miss Finland
- 2007 – Arapaho Miss
- 2008 – Samantha Miss
- 2009 – Faint Perfume
- 2010 – Brazilian Pulse
- 2011 – Mosheen
- 2012 – Dear Demi
- 2013 – Kirramosa
- 2014 – Set Square
- 2015 – Jameka
- 2016 – Lasqueti Spirit
- 2017 – Pinot
- 2018 – Aristia
- 2019 – Miami Bound
- 2020 – Personal
- 2021 – Willowy
- 2022 – She's Extreme
- 2023 – Zardozi
- 2024 – Treasurethe Moment
- 2025 – Strictly Business
- 2026 - Proxima Dea

== Social attraction ==
Kennedy Oaks Day is popularly known as Ladies Day or just Oaks Day (but in recent times also colloquially called Blokes Day). Despite being held on a work day (Melbourne Cup Day is the only public holiday during the racing carnival), Oaks Day boasts the fastest growing crowd records of any day in the Carnival; excluding the pandemic-impacted years of 2020 and 2021, every Oaks Day since 1994 has drawn a crowd of 50,000 or more. While the main draw card of the race day are the stars of the track, the other popular event on Crown Oaks Day is the annual "Fashions on the Field" celebrations. Introduced by the Victoria Racing Club in 1962 in an effort to woo more women to the track, Ladies day and the Fashions on the Field concept has grown considerably with each year and is now adopted at racetracks and smaller events all over the world.

== Attendance ==
- 1980 – 37,098
- 1981 – 37,353
- 1982 – 37,028
- 1983 – 38,633
- 1984 – 40,812
- 1985 – 39,051
- 1986 – 42,649
- 1987 – 45,329
- 1988 – 48,490
- 1989 – 51,673
- 1990 – 50,196
- 1991 – 54,023
- 1992 – 50,925
- 1993 – 46,744
- 1994 – 50,176
- 1995 – 62,388
- 1996 – 67,086
- 1997 – 75,482
- 1998 – 77,301
- 1999 – 83,870
- 2000 – 96,406
- 2001 – 101,201
- 2002 – 103,269
- 2003 – 101,179
- 2004 – 110,677
- 2005 – 100,263
- 2006 – 104,131
- 2007 – 95,230
- 2008 – 89,338
- 2009 – 80,112
- 2010 – 75,088
- 2011 – 71,659
- 2012 – 71,825
- 2013 – 66,757
- 2014 – 64,430
- 2015 – 57,560
- 2016 – 60,888
- 2017 – 63,673
- 2018 – 61,355
- 2019 – 57,296
- 2020 – 0 (no attendance due to COVID-19 pandemic restrictions)
- 2021 – 10,000 (restricted attendance due to the COVID-19 pandemic)
- 2022 – 45,046
- 2023 – 46,596
- 2024 – 50,873

== See also ==
- Red Roses Stakes
- List of Australian Group races
- Melbourne Spring Racing Carnival
- Thoroughbred racing in Australia
- Group races
