= H. Byron Moore =

Australian businessman

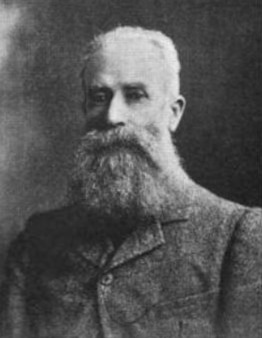
- Born: Henry Byron Moore; 11 February 1839; Surrey, England
- Died: 22 June 1925 (aged 86); Melbourne, Australia
- Burial place: Brighton General Cemetery
- Occupation(s): Businessman, public servant
- Spouse: Mary Morrow (m. 1877)

Henry Byron Moore (11 February 1839 – 22 June 1925) was an Australian businessman, remembered as secretary of the Victorian Racing Club (VRC) for 45 years, from 1881 to 1925, a few weeks before his death.

== Biography ==
Moore was born in Surrey, England on 11 February 1839. He was brought by his family to Victoria in 1852, aged 13, settling first at Geelong, then Ballarat, at the time of the gold rushes. The following year he joined the public service, where in time he was producing maps for the Land Office, where John Walter Osborne was at the forefront of the nascent art of photo-lithography. He was appointed to be Acting District Surveyor for the Geelong division of The Melbourne and Geelong Survey District on 4 June 1866, and rose to the position of Assistant Surveyor-General and District Surveyor appointed 16 September 1869. He was sacked in 1878 as one of the "Black Wednesday" dismissals instigated by Graham Berry and Peter Lalor in their policy of scorched earth political reprisals.

Most other sacked public servants were reinstated, but Moore re-invented himself a financial agent and broker, founding the Melbourne Stock Exchange in Collins Street. He also founded the Melbourne Electric Light Company, and the Melbourne Telephone Exchange Company, both of which were eventually purchased by the Government.

In 1881 Moore, who knew little about horse racing and never made a bet, was appointed successor to Robert C. Bagot as secretary to the VRC, and threw his energies into developing its racing facilities. When he was unable to convince the committee of the desirability of investing in its own grounds when the course was on Crown land, he purchased with £10,000 of his own money, 100 acres (40 ha) at the back of the hill, and years later sold it to the Club for the same sum for the great grandstand. The Flemington racecourse, one of the world's finest is thus a monument to his foresight and generosity.

Though he knew nothing of the organization of racing carnivals at the outset he was soon supervising not only the Club's affairs but racing throughout the State. Hidden behind his quiet, kindly and courteous manner was a remarkable administrative ability, and Moore was often consulted by secretaries and officials of country clubs.

During the Great War of 1914–1918 the VRC raised £102,119 for patriotic causes, and Moore was personally involved in purchasing, packing, and despatching comforts for the men in the trenches. He initiated the VRC fund for the assistance of racing men.

Like his predecessor, Bagot, he knew little of horse racing when he became secretary, but was a worthy successor.

=== Other interests ===
Away from the racetrack, Moore had artistic interests: he once wrote a book of fairy stories which was published in Melbourne, the proceeds going to the Children's Hospital. He composed and published a set of church chants to benefit the same cause. He was an accomplished organist and pianist. He instigated the first Australian production of Mendelssohn's Elijah.

=== Last days ===
Around May 1925 a meeting of the VRC committee decided to appoint a replacement for their secretary, who would continue drawing the same salary for life. That turned out to be only a few weeks, as Moore died from pneumonia in Melbourne after a very brief illness, coincidentally on 22 June, the closing date for applications for the job. His remains were interred at the Brighton General Cemetery.

== Tributes ==
He was a man of sterling qualities and noble character. His ability as a secretary was quite exceptional, and he set up standard which it would be very difficult to surpass, or even to maintain. By his foresight he practically made Flemington what it is, and there could he no better monument to him than the racecourse itself. His enterprise, his breadth of vision, his charity and his noble dignity will never be forgotten. His influence on racing and the community generally has been incalculable. The committee, in appointing him adviser to the club for life, realised that anything it might do would be inadequate to express the debt it owed to him.

— H. Alan Currie, acting chairman of the VRC.

== Family ==
Moore married Mary Morrow (c. 1847 – 4 July 1938) on 20 September 1877. Their children included two sons:

- Eric Byron Moore
- Carl Byron Moore
