= Payment of members =

Payment of members is the provision of a salary to members of a legislature.

From time to time, proposals were made to reintroduce in the English parliamentary system a practice that was almost universally adopted in other countries, that of paying a state salary to members of the legislative body. In the earlier history of the English parliament the payment of commoners or representatives of the people was for long the practice. They had first been summoned to the great council of the realm in 1264 in the reign of Henry III. The shires and boroughs they represented paid them for their services, and reimbursed the expenses they were put to in journeying to and from the place of meeting. In 1322, by a statute of Edward II, the salary of a knight was fixed at 4 shillings a day, and that of a citizen or burgher at 2 shillings a day.

These payments could be enforced by writs issued after the dissolution of each parliament, and there were many instances of the issue of such writs down to the reign of Henry VIII; while the last known instance is that of one Thomas King, who in 1681 obtained a writ for his salary against the corporation of Harwich. The practice of the payment of members of parliament gradually fell into desuetude, and in the second parliament of Charles II, strong disapproval was expressed of the practice. Its gradual abandonment was due first to the difficulty of securing representatives in the early parliaments. Men of business were unwilling to detach themselves from their affairs, as travel was slow and dangerous; in addition to the perils of the journey there was the almost certain knowledge that a safe return from parliament would be followed by the ill-will of the member's neighbours, for every meeting of parliament was but a device on the part of the sovereign for inflicting some new form of taxation, and a refusal to vote such taxation was but to incur the royal displeasure. The towns themselves were equally disinclined to bear the burden of their members maintenance.

In the United Kingdom, the House of Commons had on various occasions carried resolutions in favour of the principle, more especially on the 24 March 1893 (by 276 votes to 229), and on 22 March 1895 (by 176 to 158). On these occasions, the resolutions simply specified an adequate allowance; but on 7 March 1906, a resolution was carried (by 348 votes to 110) in favour of an allowance at the rate of £300 per annum, prior to that, the amount was 40 guineas per annum.
