= Australian Racing Board =

National body for Thoroughbred racing in Australia

- Jurisdiction: Australia
- Founded: 1998
- (Australia)

The Australian Racing Board, established in 1998, is the peak national administration body for Thoroughbred racing in Australia. The statutory bodies for racing in each State or Territory, known as the Principal Racing Authorities, set up the Australian Racing Board by consensual agreement. This consensus by the States is achieved by agreeing to abide by and to enforce the Australian Rules of Racing which are within the authority of the ARB.

== State based authorities ==
The Principal Racing Authorities are:

- Racing Victoria Limited
- NSW Thoroughbred Racing Board
- Thoroughbred Racing S.A Limited
- Racing Queensland Limited
- Racing and Wagering Western Australia
- Tasmanian Thoroughbred Racing Council
- Darwin Turf Club
- Canberra Racing Club

== Scope of the authority ==
It is the Australian Racing Board’s responsibility to ensure that thoroughbred racing in all States and Territories of Australia is conducted according to the same general practices, conditions and integrity.

The on-course responsibility for the supervision of the fair-running of races is delegated to the racing stewards, veterinarians and analysts who conduct the race meetings on behalf of the race clubs, and strictly apply the Rules of Racing.

The Australian Rules of Racing also provide for a Racing Appeals Tribunal to enable a person punished by the stewards to seek a review by a body that is independent of the racing industry.

Besides its administration role, the Australian Racing Board has a number of advisory groups which investigate, discuss, make recommendations, and give advice on matters such as Equine integrity and welfare, Group and Listed races, Rules Review and Handicapping.

== Registration of racehorses ==
The Australian Stud Book, an independent organisation, and the Registrar of Racehorses also submit reports to the Australian Racing Board. In September 2014 the Board announced it would merge with the Australian Stud Book and Racing Information Services Australia to form a new national body to administer thoroughbred racing, to be called Racing Australia.

== See also ==
- Australian Polo Federation
- Australian Professional Rodeo Association
- Equestrian Australia
