= R. C. Bagot =

Irish-Australian horse racing official (1827/8-1881)

Robert Cooper Bagot (1827 or 1828 – 14 April 1881) was an Irish-Australian horse racing official in Melbourne, Australia. He was secretary of the Victorian Racing Club and largely responsible for the early success of the Melbourne Cup.

== Life ==
Robert Cooper Bagot was born in 1827 or 1828, in Co. Kildare, Ireland. He was the fourth son of Rev. John Bagot MA. His brother was Canon Richard Bagot DD. He emigrated to Sydney, then to Moreton Bay, Queensland in the 1840s and moved to Victoria in 1848 or 1855.

By profession a civil engineer and surveyor, he was introduced to Australian sports administration when he was contracted by the Melbourne Cricket Club to redesign their ground, and gained such a reputation that in 1864 he was appointed secretary of the newly-formed VRC after its merger with the Victorian Jockey Club.

He was largely responsible for the erection of a much larger grandstand, facetiously dubbed "Bagot's cowshed", at Flemington Racecourse. He filled in the swampy ground at the centre of the course and had it grassed, creating "The Flat", and persuaded the committee to purchase the rising property adjacent, which became "The Hill", both now celebrated features of Australia's premier racecourse. He has been credited with persuading the Victorian Government to declare Cup Day a bank holiday in lieu of the Prince of Wales's Birthday, which fell on 9 November.

Transparently even-handed, in all the years he was a VRC official, he never made a wager and was not interested in horse racing as a sport.

His was not a strong constitution, but was working until a few days before his death. His remains were buried at the Melbourne General Cemetery. Punctilious in his methods, there was nothing left undone, and it was agreed his successor would have no difficulty following his work.

== Recognition ==
- He was made a life member of the Melbourne Cricket Club for his work on the MCG.
- The Bagot Plate (1884–1886) and Bagot Handicap (from 1887), held at Flemington every New Year's Day, were named in his honour.
- Newspapers from all over Australia marked his death with glowing tributes.
- Bagot was elected to Sport Australia's Hall of Fame in 1989.

== Family ==
He was twice married, to Jane Smith (1833–1873), sister of mayor John Thomas Smith and in 1874 to Maria Gregory (1844 or 1845–1928); he had a son by his first wife and two daughters, Nellie and Olive, by the second. They had a home at Ascot Vale, a suburb of Melbourne, Victoria. Maria Bagot married again, to Henry Capel Pigott (1825–1918).
