= Australian Rules of Racing =

Australian horse racing rules

The Australian Rules of Racing are the rules approved by the Australian Racing Board to ensure that thoroughbred horse racing in all States and Territories of Australia is conducted according to the same general practices, conditions and integrity. The Principal Racing Authority in each State or Territory also have a set of Local Rules which apply to all horse racing held in their jurisdiction.

== Rules ==
The following is a list of the topics covered by the Australian Rules of Racing. The complete Australian Rules of Racing, as of 1 August 2012 is available as an 85 page PDF file

- Definitions AR.1
- Restricted races AR.1a
- Application of these rules AR.2 - 6
- Powers of a principal racing authority AR.7 - 7a
- Stewards AR.8 - 10a
- Registration of clubs and meetings AR.11 - 13
- Registration of horses AR.14 - 27
- Assumed names AR.28 - 31 (rescinded)
- Leases AR.32 - 34
- Race meetings AR.35 - 46b
- Nominations and entries AR.47 - 68a
- Syndicates AR.69 - 70
- Death of nominator AR.71
- Stakes and forfeits AR.72 - 74
- The forfeit list AR.75 - 77
- Sale with engagements AR.78 - 79
- Trainers AR.80 - 80e
- Jockeys and riders AR.81 - 91
- Apprentices allowances AR.92
- Stablehands and apprentices AR.93 - 96
- Retainers AR.97 - 100
- Amateurs AR.101 - 102
- Weights, penalties and allowances AR.103 - 113
- Scratching AR.114 - 117
- Weighing out AR.118 - 123
- Starting AR.124 - 134a
- Running AR.135 - 141b
- Weighing in AR.142 - 150
- Dead-heats AR.151 - 153
- Judge's decision AR.154 - 157
- Walk-over AR.158 - 160
- Course telecasts AR.160a - 160c
- Objections and complaints AR.161 - 174
- Offences AR.175 - 176
- Prohibited substances AR.177 - 178e
- Punishments AR.179 - 200
- Destruction of horse AR.201
- Notices AR.202 - 206
- Facsimile transmissions AR.207
- Australian racing board AR.208 - 214
- New rules AR.215
