= William Cross Yuille =

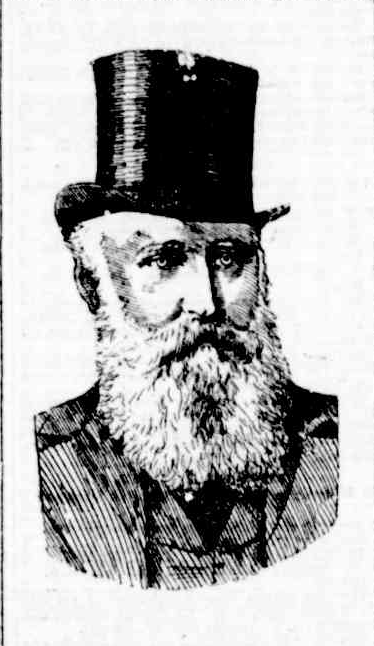
- Born: 28 March 1819; Cardross, Scotland
- Died: 19 July 1894 (aged 75); East Melbourne
- Occupations: Grazier, explorer, pioneer
- Spouse: Marry Denny
- Children: Archibald Yuille, Albert Yuille

William Cross Yuille (28 March 1819 – 19 July 1894) was a Scottish Australian pastoralist notable as, after immigrating to Australia, as a founder of Ballarat as well as for his role in the establishment of the Victorian horse racing.

== Life ==
Yuille was baptised on 28 March 1819 in Glasgow, Scotland.

Yuille was educated in Glasgow and was apprenticed for three years in the West India house of Messrs Ewing and Co. of Glasgow. He sailed from Liverpool on 23 August 1836 aged 17 on Statesman, commanded by Captain Rowlett. The ship landed in Hobart Town, Van Diemens Land on 9 December 1836. At that time there were glowing accounts of the new settlement of Port Phillip District that were engaging to the attention of the Pastoralists of Van Diemens Land and William Cross, fired by his pioneer spirit and his youth, decided to cross to the 'land of promise'.

Yuille sailed on the vessel Rajah and landed at Point Henry, near Geelong on 27 February 1837with the intention of joining his cousin Archibald Buchanan Yuille. He and his cousin Archibald purchased 2200 well-bred Merino sheep from Peter Murdoch, shipped them in John Dunscombe in February 1837. Later in June 1837 there was an attack on the Yuille's station by the Aboriginal people. William took possession of a run at Murgheboluc on the Barwon River near Inverleigh and in January 1838, a small party made up of John Aitken, Henry Anderson, Thomas, Somerville, Learmonth and Yuille struck out north to search for Joseph Gellibrand and G.B.L. Hesse, who had been lost in the bush, and to search for new squatting lands. If they had received a squatters license it may have come from Foster Fyans, who was the Police Magistrate sent to the area by the request of the cousins and other squatters concerned with the troublesome natives.

Yuille settled south of Black Swamp in the area which was to become part of the gold rush settlement of Ballarat in 1838, and two years later, having sold his station there, went to New Zealand, where he was present at the ceremony of taking possession of those islands for the British Government by Governor Hobson, and the signing of the treaty of Waitangi. Returning to Victoria, Yuille embarked in squatting at Rockbank, on the Werribee Plain, occupying the country from within a few miles of Williamstown to Mount Cottrell. There he owned and trained a number of successful performers on the Victorian turf, and after revisiting England several times, where he made fresh purchases, he settled in Williamstown in 1858, and reared numerous winners in his stables. One of the more famous and popular horses he owned was Flying Buck, with which he won the inaugural Champion Race at Flemington in 1859. Flying Buck won the St. Ledger in 1860, after which Yuille sold the horse. Yuille entered a number of horses in the Melbourne Cup, assisting nominal trainer Pat Miley with 1865 Melbourne Cup winner Toryboy, who Yuille had previously owned.

Yuille was for many years one of the foremost men on the Victorian turf, being one of the stewards of the Jockey Club, handicapper to the Victoria Racing Club, and one of the leading members of Tattersall's committee, until his retirement in 1881. For six years he contributed to The Australasian under the soubriquet "Peeping Tom", and is the compiler of the Australian Stud Book, which is recognised as the standard work of reference throughout the Australasian colonies.

Later in life, Yuille was a famed auctioneer who was involved in the sale of a number of horse studs.

He married Marry Denny in Victoria on 7 July 1842.

== Death ==
He died on 19 July 1894 in East Melbourne, with his remains interred at the St Kilda Cemetery.

== Legacy ==
Lake Wendouree was for some time known as "Yuille's Swamp". Several streets are named after him including streets in Ballarat, Melton, Buninyong, Geelong West, Brighton. Yuille Primary School in Wendouree is also named after him.
