= Racing and Wagering Western Australia =

Racing and Wagering Western Australia, or RWWA (often pronounced "RaaWaa") is a controlling authority for thoroughbred, harness and greyhound racing in the state of Western Australia.

The authority was formed to take principal club functions out of the hands of the Western Australian Turf Club, the Western Australian Trotting Association and the Western Australian Greyhound Racing Authority, which now only remain responsible for the conduct of racing activities at their respective venues.

RWWA was also formed to take control of the off-course betting activities of the Totalisator Agency Board (commonly known as the TAB), which in turn had been created in 1961 as a result of the 1959 Royal Commission into off course betting.

== Annual report ==
- Annual report / Racing and Wagering Western Australia. Osborne Park, W.A. : Racing and Wagering Western Australia, 2004-
