= Victoria Racing Club =

Horse racing organisation in Victoria, Australia

- Sport: Horse racing
- Abbreviation: VRC
- Founded: 1864
- Headquarters: Flemington racecourse
- Location: Melbourne, Victoria, Australia
- Chairman: Neil Wilson
- CEO: Kylie Rogers

Official website
- www.vrc.com.au

The Victoria Racing Club was founded in 1864. It was formed following the disbanding of the Victoria Turf Club and the Victoria Jockey Club. A legacy passed from the Victoria Turf Club was the annual "race that stops a nation", the Melbourne Cup, which was first contested in 1861.

From its foundation in 1864 until 2001, the Victoria Racing Club was the responsible authority for the conduct of thoroughbred racing in the State of Victoria, Australia. Since 2001, this role has been managed by Racing Victoria Limited.

The VRC is managed by an unpaid committee, elected by club members.

The Victoria Racing Club Act 1871 (35 Vict. No. 398) appointed the VRC as trustees of a site of 352 acres (1.4 km^{2}) of Crown Land, next to the Maribyrnong River, which became known as Flemington Racecourse. Much of the early success of the VRC is attributed to the administration of the first Secretary of the club, R. C. Bagot and his successors H. Byron Moore and A. V. Kewney.

== Racing carnivals ==
The Victoria Racing Club hosts four race meetings at Flemington during the Melbourne Spring Racing Carnival. The Melbourne Cup is run on the first Tuesday in November, the Victoria Derby are held on the Saturday before the Melbourne Cup, the VRC Oaks is on the Thursday following the Cup, and LKS MacKinnon Stakes is on the Saturday following the Oaks.

The VRC also hosts race meetings during the Melbourne Autumn Racing Carnival. These meetings include Group 1 races for the Australian Cup, the Newmarket Handicap and the Black Caviar Lightning.

== See also ==
- Australian Stud Book
