= Bird-in-Hand =

Bird-in-Hand or Bird in Hand may refer to:

- Bird-in-Hand, Pennsylvania, a census-designated place (CDP) in Lancaster County, Pennsylvania, United States
  - Bird-in-Hand Hotel, a historic hotel built in 1852
- Bird in Hand winery near Woodside in the Adelaide Hills of South Australia, Australia
- Bird-in-Hand mine a historic gold mine after which the winery is named
- Bird in Hand (painting), a painting by Ellen Gallagher, in the collection of the Tate Modern in London, United Kingdom
- Bird in Hand (film), a 2025 American comedy-drama
- Bird in Hand, a play by John Drinkwater
