= Inverbrackie, South Australia =

Inverbrackie
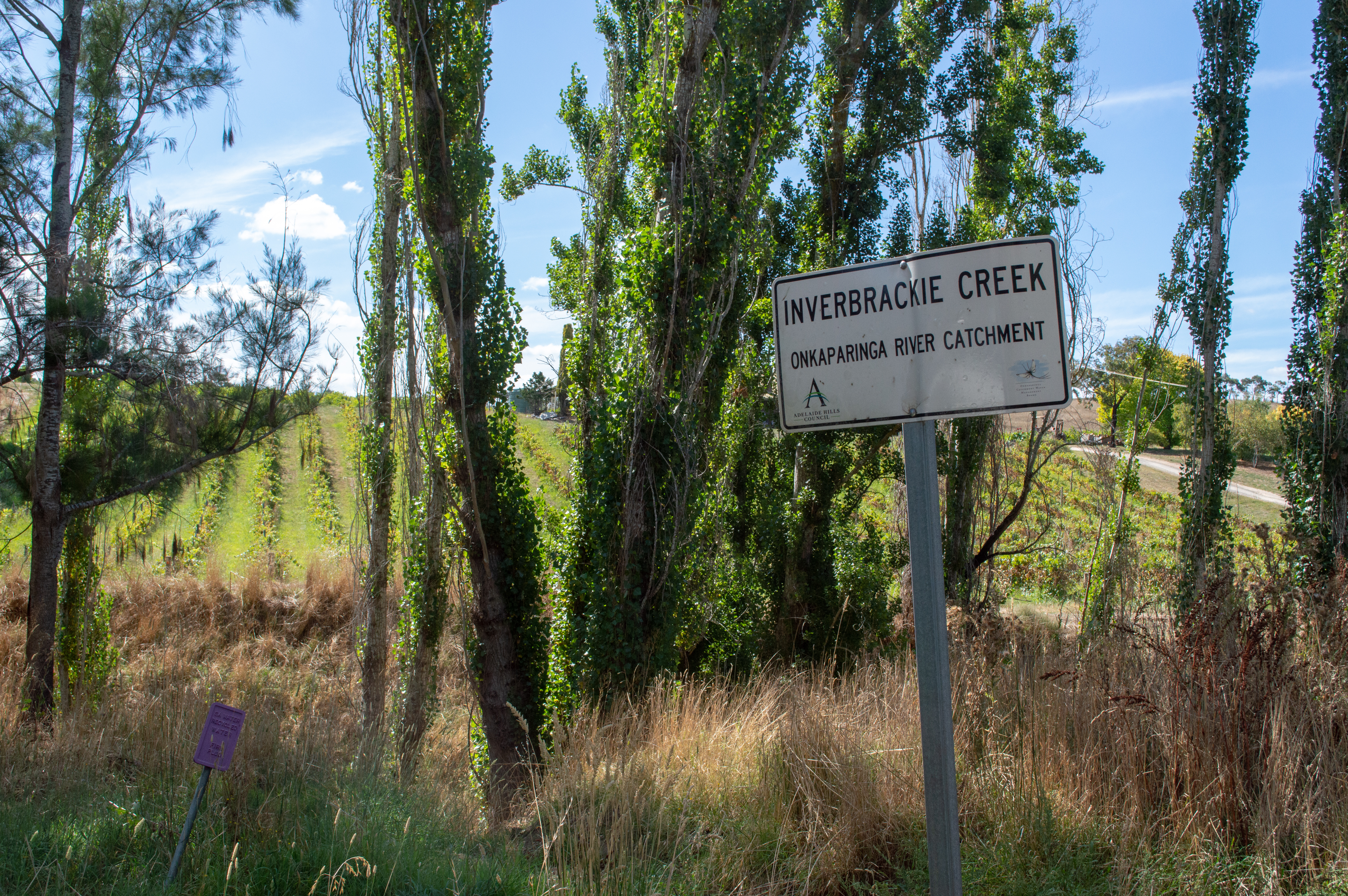
- Creek passing through Inverbrackie

- Coordinates: 34°58′22″S 138°53′36″E
- Country: Australia
- State: South Australia
- City: Woodside
- LGA: Adelaide Hills Council

Inverbrackie is a place within the locality of Woodside in the Australian state of South Australia located about 3 kilometres (1.9 mi) from the 'town centre' in Woodside.

It includes the Woodside Barracks (16th Air Land Regiment), South Australia, although there are also some other residents and businesses in Inverbrackie.

It is on the Nairne to Woodside road. The speed limit changes from 100 kilometres an hour to 80 kilometres an hour near the start of Inverbrackie.

== Early settlement ==
The area was first explored by Europeans in January 1838 when Dr George Imlay and John Hill passed through while making the first crossing of the Central Mount Lofty Ranges. The first European settlers were the family of John and Margaret Murdoch from Scotland, who pioneered a sheep station in early 1839, giving their name to Murdoch Valley and Murdoch Hill. Many subsequent pioneers were also of Scottish presbyterian origin, leading to the establishment in the early 1840s of a Church of Scotland church. Although initially populated by mainly Scottish settlers, a number of English and German settlers arrived later.

== Economy ==
The geography is mostly well-watered hilly timbered country with some alluvial flats, which particularly lends itself to grazing. Dairy produce and pastoralism have long been mainstays of the economy, as well as limited grain and market garden cropping. Positioned as a stop-over for people travelling to Adelaide, the township originally consisted of a single church, a pub and a number of small houses. In 1863 gold was discovered in the district and the largest and richest mine, the Bird-in-Hand mine, opened in 1881. This provided local employment for many decades, until closed by flooding in the 1940s. Other than that, little commercial development has taken place. The district is quite picturesque which, with the growth of local wine production, has led to an increasing tourism industry.

== Military presence ==
In the early 1920s the Australian government made a series of land purchases that were part of the establishment of an Army camp known as Woodside Camp in 1927, now known as Woodside Barracks. Throughout the interwar years, the camp was occupied by units of the Citizens Forces. During the Second World War, the camp was used to raise units of the Second Australian Imperial Force and a number of US Army units were also based there. In the post war period the base has been home to a number of regular Army infantry units but since 1981 has only been occupied by the 16th Air Defence Regiment.

== Refugee camp and Immigration detention facility ==
After the Second World War, Inverbrackie was the site of a refugee camp. In 2010, the Australian Federal Government announced that it would house refugees again. The 'Inverbrackie Alternative Place of Detention' was a low security, family orientated immigration detention centre, with the children attending local primary and high schools. The detention centre was managed by Serco and housed a maximum of 400 people. While there was some controversy regarding the establishment of the detention centre in the area, community anger subsided. In early 2014 it was announced that the Abbott government would close the facility by the end of the year, and there was speculation as to what the facility would be used for in the future. The last of the asylum seekers were moved out of Inverbrackie in mid December 2014.
