= Oakbank Easter Racing Carnival =

Coordinates: 34°58′37.47″S 138°50′49.94″E

The Oakbank Easter Racing Carnival is a horse-racing meeting held over two days by the Oakbank Racing Club at the Oakbank Racecourse located in the Adelaide Hills in South Australia. The carnival is a mixture of flat and jumping races, with two and four jump races on day one and two, featuring jumping races on day two.

Day one is held on Easter Saturday and is one of the most attended race days in Australia. The Von Doussa Steeplechase (named after founder Alfred von Doussa) took place on day one and was a preliminary to the Great Eastern Steeplechase held on Easter Monday. A "classic" hurdle race takes place on Monday, and so does the feature flat race, the Onkaparinga Cup.

The Oakbank Racing Club conducts the meeting and is popular with families and groups. Although ostensibly a horse race meeting, Oakbank is an event in itself with carnival rides, picnics, and other activities. Many families camp for the whole weekend in the paddocks adjacent to the track, and some have done so all their lives.

Patrons travelled by train from Adelaide to nearby Balhannah railway station, 2 miles (3.2 km) from the course, from 1884. When the Mount Pleasant railway line opened in 1918, a platform was constructed adjacent to the course, permitting special race trains to run direct to the course the following Easter. The line to Mount Pleasant closed on 3 March 1963; thus, the race trains ran no more.

On October 1, 2021, it was announced that jumps racing would no longer be conducted in South Australia, mainly due to the small number of South Australian jumps horses. There were plans to run the Great Eastern and Von Doussa Steeplechase as a flat race. However, on 3rd March 2022, it was announced that it would not happen. Many jumps racing supporters attempted to keep jumps racing at Oakbank, and that fight went into the South Australian Court System. That would result in an election that the anti-jumps faction won, but the debate surrounding that vote spilled into more legal action. However, only a short time after, the South Australian Government stepped in and outlawed jump racing in the state.
