= Onkaparinga =

Onkapringa may refer to:

- Onkaparinga Football Club, a predecessor of the Onkaparinga Valley Football Club
- Onkaparinga Racecourse - now called the Oakbank Racecourse
- Onkaparinga Racing Club - now called the Oakbank Racing Club
- District Council of Onkaparinga, a former local government area in South Australia
- Onkaparinga River, a river in South Australia
- Onkaparinga Rugby Union Football Club
- City of Onkaparinga, a local government area in South Australia
- Electoral district of Onkaparinga, a former electorate district in South Australia
- Hundred of Onkaparinga, a cadastral unit in South Australia

== See also ==
- Onkaparinga Hills, South Australia
