= Ambleside (disambiguation) =

Ambleside is a town in Cumbria, England, UK.

Ambleside may also refer to:

- Ambleside, Edmonton, a neighbourhood in Edmonton, Alberta, Canada
- Ambleside, Ottawa, a neighbourhood in Ottawa, Ontario, Canada
- Hahndorf, South Australia, a town in South Australia, named Ambleside from 1918 to 1935
- Ambleside, West Vancouver, a neighbourhood in West Vancouver, British Columbia, Canada
- Ambleside railway station, a railway station in Balhannah, South Australia, Australia

== See also ==
- CSI:Ambleside, an album by UK rock band Half Man Half Biscuit
