= Amy Gillett Bikeway =

Trail in the Adelaide Hills, South Australia

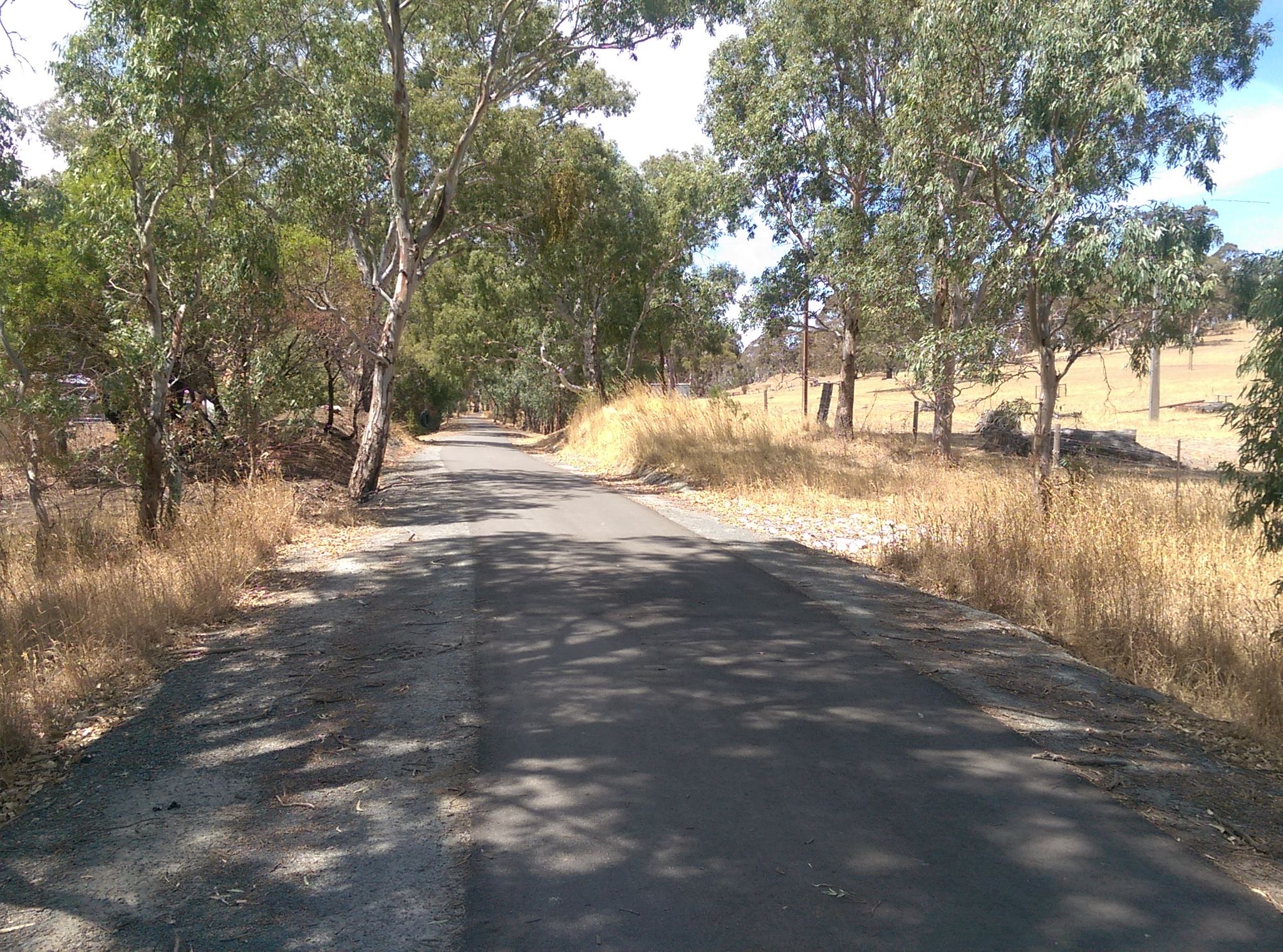
- Amy Gillett Bikeway scene
- Length: 17 km (11 mi)
- Location: Adelaide Hills, South Australia
- Established: 2010
- Trailheads: Oakbank, Mount Torrens
- Use: Cycling, Hiking, jogging, horse riding
- Elevation change: 114 m (374 ft)
- Highest point: 498 m (1,634 ft)
- Lowest point: 371 m (1,217 ft)
- Grade: gentle
- Difficulty: easy
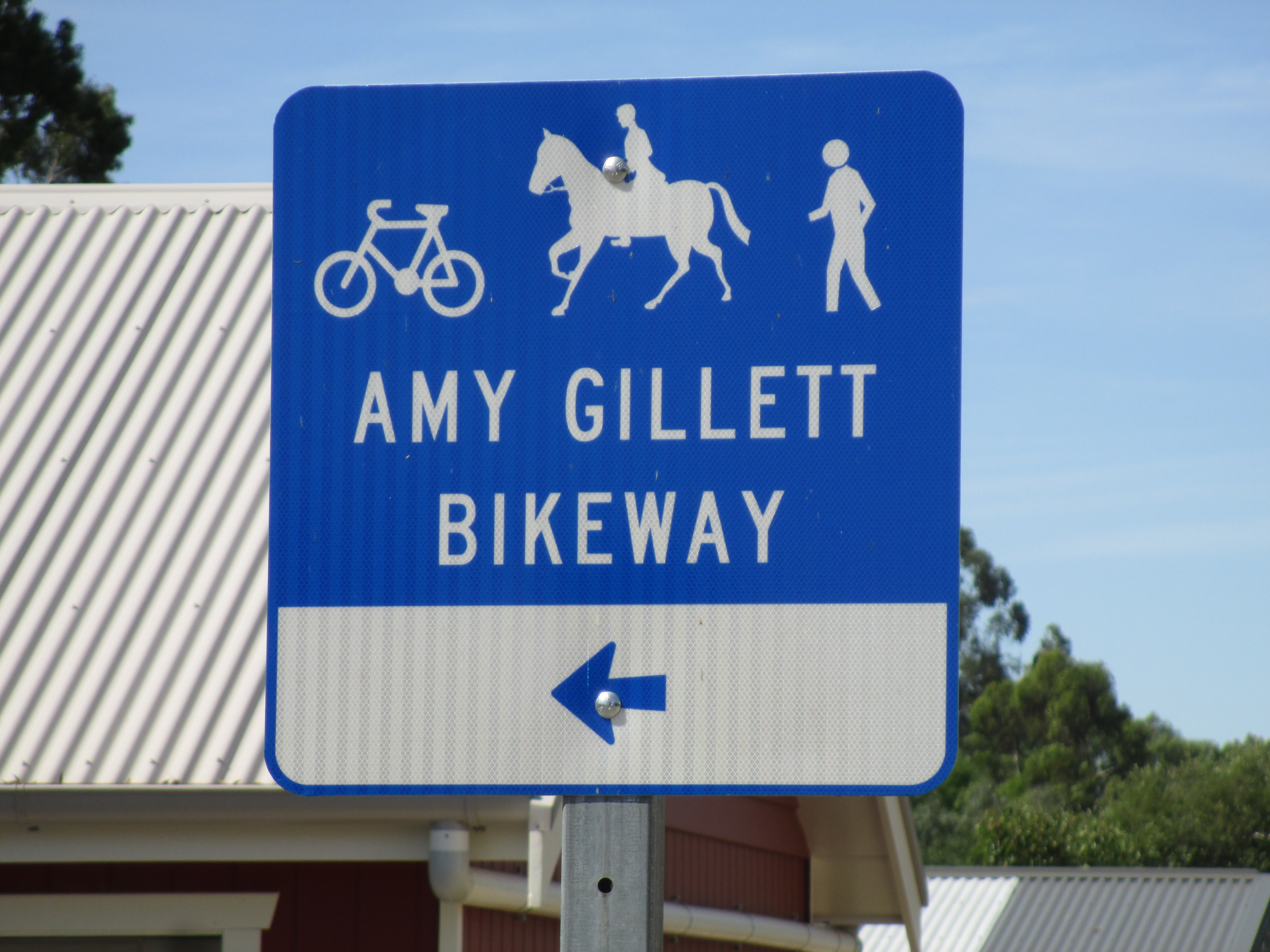
- Waymark
- Surface: asphalt
- Right of way: Mount Pleasant railway line
- Website: http://www.adelaidehillsrailtrail.org.au/

The Amy Gillett Bikeway or Amy Gillett Rail Trail or Amy Gillett Pathway is a shared path in the Adelaide Hills on part of the alignment of the former Mount Pleasant railway line. It is a 17 kilometres (11 mi) sealed path suitable for recreational cycling, walking and horse riding. The trail is named after Australian track cyclist and rower Amy Gillett.

Stage 1 was opened in January 2010 by Patrick Conlon, then the South Australian Minister for Transport, Energy and Infrastructure. Stage 1 extended 4 kilometres (2.5 mi) between Oakbank and Woodside, with kerbside bike lanes on Onkaparinga Valley Road continuing south from the trailhead through Oakbank. Stage 2 extended it through Charleston and Stage 3 opened in May 2014 added 7 kilometres (4.3 mi) to Mount Torrens. Future work could extend it another 15 kilometres (9.3 mi) through Birdwood to Mount Pleasant.

Funding for Stage 4 was secured in 2024, with the Adelaide Hills Council agreeing to contribute $500,000. This stage is expected to be completed by mid-2025. The final stage, to linking the bikeway to the existing Barossa Trail, was still under negotiation in April 2024.

There are also several side loop trails available to interesting destinations off the main path.
