= Great Eastern Steeplechase =

South Australia Horse Race

The Great Eastern Steeplechase was an Australian Thoroughbred steeplechase horse race held annually at Oakbank, South Australia on Easter Saturday and Monday at the Oakbank Racecourse as part of the Oakbank Easter Racing Carnival. The first fixture of that name was held in 1877, following a race in 1876 which has been called the "Onkaparinga Handicap Steeplechase"; both just prior to formation of the Onkaparinga Racing Club (now Oakbank Racing Club).

The distance of the race is 4950 metres making it the second longest horse race held on a public course in Australia.

The most famous jump is the fallen log which is literally a log about a metre high. All other jumps are brush fences. The height of jumps has been reduced in recent years to reduce the risk of falls and make for safer racing.

The race uses a different course to other races held at Oakbank with horse using an inner track passing on the inside of a hill. Unlike other races that require two race callers the Great Eastern can be viewed in its entirety from the grandstand.

On October 1, 2021, it was announced that jumps racing will no longer be conducted in South Australia mainly due to the small number of South Australian jumps horses. There were plans to run the Great Eastern and Von Doussa Steeplechase as a flat race. However, on 3 March 2022 it was announced that would not happen. However, many jumps racing supporters attempted to keep jumps racing at Oakbank and that fight went into the South Australian Court System. That would result in an election occurring which the anti-jumps faction won but debate surrounding that vote spilled into more legal action. But not long after the South Australian Government stepped in and outlawed jumps racing in the state.

== Past winners ==
- 2021 – Spying on You
- 2020 – race not held
- 2019 – Zed Em
- 2018 – Zed Em
- 2017 – Spying on You
- 2016 – Thubiaan (USA)
- 2015 – Lord of the Song
- 2014 – Lord of the Song
- 2013 – Man of Class
- 2012 – Tobouggie Nights
- 2011 – Petushki
- 2010 – It's A Dud
- 2009 – Pentacolo
- 2008 – Conzeal
- 2007 – Blase
- 2006 – Real Tonic
- 2005 – Chakra
- 2004 – Boxter Blue
- 2003 – Raquets
- 2002 – Ballata
- 2001 – St. Steven
- 2000 – Bruskin
- 1999 – Planet Hollywood
- 1998 – Turkey Lane
- 1997 – Foxboy
- 1996 – Light Hand
- 1995 – Light Hand
- 1994 – Tyrolia
- 1993 – Touch Judge
- 1992 – Vinchiamo
- 1991 – Look at Me
- 1990 – Commission Red
- 1989 – Brown Cast
- 1988 – River Amos
- 1987 – Spring Fortune
- 1986 – Region
- 1985 – Battle So Big
- 1984 – Headford Town
- 1983 – Venite
- 1982 – Donrewen
- 1981 – Dark Shareif
- 1980 – Lord Rocky Red
- 1979 – Heroic Speech
- 1978 – Roughneck
- 1977 – The Champ
- 1976 – Aberfoyle
- 1975 – Vermet
- 1974 – Club Spirit
- 1973 – The Cent
- 1972 – Club Spirit
- 1971 – Crusoe Cloud
- 1970 – Mystic Moon
- 1969 – Halbrian
- 1968 – Robin Star
- 1967 – Con Sol
- 1966 – Kooroshali
- 1965 – Kooroshali
- 1964 – First Shuffle
- 1963 – Blue Gum
- 1962 – Grecian Valour
- 1961 – Moonacoota
- 1960 – Peakite
- 1959 – Sebago
- 1958 – Tory Star
- 1957 – Just Mick
- 1956 – Teedum
- 1955 – The Drum
- 1954 – Lynford
- 1953 – Gulf Stream
- 1952 – Royal Pentzia
- 1951 – The Feline
- 1950 – Parilla's Pride
- 1949 – Footling
- 1948 – The Feline
- 1947 – Marble Hill
- 1946 – Ajester
- 1945 – Winterset
- 1944 – Lime Rock
- 1943 – race not held
- 1942 – race not held
- 1941 – National Debt
- 1940 – Bully Hayes
- 1939 – Grantley
- 1938 – race meeting abandoned
- 1937 – Lady Madge
- 1936 – Gnair
- 1935 – Kingstol
- 1934 – Kenjin
- 1933 – Pispoia King
- 1932 – Archeson
- 1931 – Shooting Boy
- 1930 – Woomera
- 1929 – Laurelmond
- 1928 – Epergne
- 1927 – Unohoo / Mt. Cooper (dead heat)
- 1926 – Mt. Cooper
- 1925 – Dundalk
- 1924 – Fleetstone
- 1923 – Doiran
- 1922 – Doiran
- 1921 – Albaree
- 1920 – Miss Rosslyn
- 1919 – Doiran
- 1918 – Doiran
- 1917 – Flash Jack
- 1916 – Wyndarra
- 1915 – Tramp
- 1914 – Vanguard
- 1913 – Tramp
- 1912 – Vanguard
- 1911 – Matchlock
- 1910 – Generality
- 1909 – Workmaster
- 1908 – Tarpon
- 1907 – Napier
- 1906 – Bombastes
- 1905 – Poster
- 1904 – Syringa
- 1903 – Drummer
- 1902 – Ronald
- 1901 – Wooral
- 1900 – Euro
- 1899 – Domino
- 1898 – Songster
- 1897 – Eclipse
- 1896 – Dungan
- 1895 – Waterloo
- 1894 – The Actress
- 1893 – Shanks
- 1892 – Vistula
- 1891 – Messenger
- 1890 – Mahdi
- 1889 – Flashlight
- 1888 – Adeline
- 1887 – Swordfish
- 1886 – Charcoal
- 1885 – Swordfish
- 1884 – Trigger
- 1883 – Depriver
- 1882 – Hotspur
- 1881 – Trigger
- 1880 – Gunn
- 1879 – Lightfoot
- 1878 – Darkie
- 1877 – Darkie
- 1876 – Tormentor
