= Royal Australian Artillery =

Administrative corps of the Australian Army

Royal Regiment of Australian Artillery
- Royal Australian Artillery cap badge
- Active: 1 March 1901 – present
- Country: Australia
- Branch: Australian Army
- Type: Artillery
- Role: Field artillery (3 regiments); Air defence (1 regiment); Surveillance and target acquisition (1 regiment)
- Size: Six Regiments
- Nickname: The 9 Mile Snipers
- Mottos: Latin: Ubique and Latin: Quo Fas et Gloria Ducunt; Everywhere and Where right and glory lead
- March: Quick: Royal Artillery Quick March; Slow: Royal Artillery Slow March
- Anniversaries: 1 August (Regimental birthday).

Commanders
- Captain-General: King Charles III

Insignia
- Identification symbol: Red over blue.

The Royal Regiment of Australian Artillery, normally referred to as the Royal Australian Artillery (RAA), is a Regiment of the Australian Army descended from the original colonial artillery units prior to Australia's federation. Australia's first guns were landed from HMS Sirius and a small earthen redoubt built, near the present-day Macquarie Place, to command the approaches to Sydney Cove. The deployment of these guns represents the origins of artillery in Australia. These and subsequent defences, as well as field guns, were operated by marines and the soldiers of infantry regiments stationed in Australia. Unlike their British and Canadian equivalents, there are no regiments of horse artillery in the order of battle of the Royal Australian Artillery. The First World War saw the raising of 60 field, 20 howitzer, and two siege batteries along with the heavy and medium trench mortar batteries. Until 19 September 1962 the Australian Artillery was referred to as the 'Royal Australian Artillery', however, on this date Queen Elizabeth II granted the RAA the title of 'The Royal Regiment of Australian Artillery'. The Regiment today consists of Regular and Reserve units.

== Role ==
To maximise the combat power of the Australian Defence Forces through the provision of offensive support coordination and indirect firepower, surveillance and target acquisition and ground-based air defence. To fire long range weapons to inflict casualties, to destroy equipment and fortifications, and to cooperate with infantry and armour to eliminate enemy resistance.

== History ==
Pre-Federation

The first Royal Artillery unit arrived in Australia in 1856 and began a succession of gunner units that garrisoned Australia, which ended with the withdrawal of the imperial forces in 1870. This resulted in the raising of the Victorian Artillery Corps in Melbourne in 1870 and the New South Wales Artillery in Sydney on 1 August 1871.

Federation to present

The Australian Regular Army came into being in 1947, while prior to this artillery units were predominantly militia based. The permanent artillery consisted of one field battery, 'A' Field Battery - which now perpetuates the New South Wales Artillery, HQ P Anti-Aircraft Battery with 1st, 2nd and 3rd AA Cadres under command, the independent 4th and 5th AA Cadres, HQ 1st, 2nd and 3rd Heavy Brigades and the 1st to 13th Heavy Batteries. Prior to the Second World War heavy artillery, later called coast artillery, units were established at strategic locations around the coastline, however, these units were progressively phased out by 1962. During the Second World War, the RAA raised in excess of 70 regiments of field, medium, anti-tank, anti-aircraft and survey artillery, and in excess of 200 anti-aircraft and coast artillery batteries with their attendant anti-aircraft group or fire command headquarters in the fixed defences. Many saw action in the Middle East, Malaya and Southwest Pacific theatres, with two field regiments, one anti-tank regiment, one independent anti-tank battery, an anti-aircraft battery and two coast batteries being captured by the Japanese in Singapore, Ambon, Timor and New Britain while serving as part of the 8th Division.

The present School of Artillery (completed in 1998) is located in Puckapunyal in central Victoria and maintains modern training facilities. The School of Artillery is co-located with the Australian Army's Headquarters Combined Arms Training Centre. 53rd Battery, Royal Australian Artillery supports courses run by the School of Artillery.

In January 2011, the field regiments and medium regiment were reorganised, with the regiments and batteries renamed with the word "field" and "medium" no longer appearing in their titles.

== Structure ==
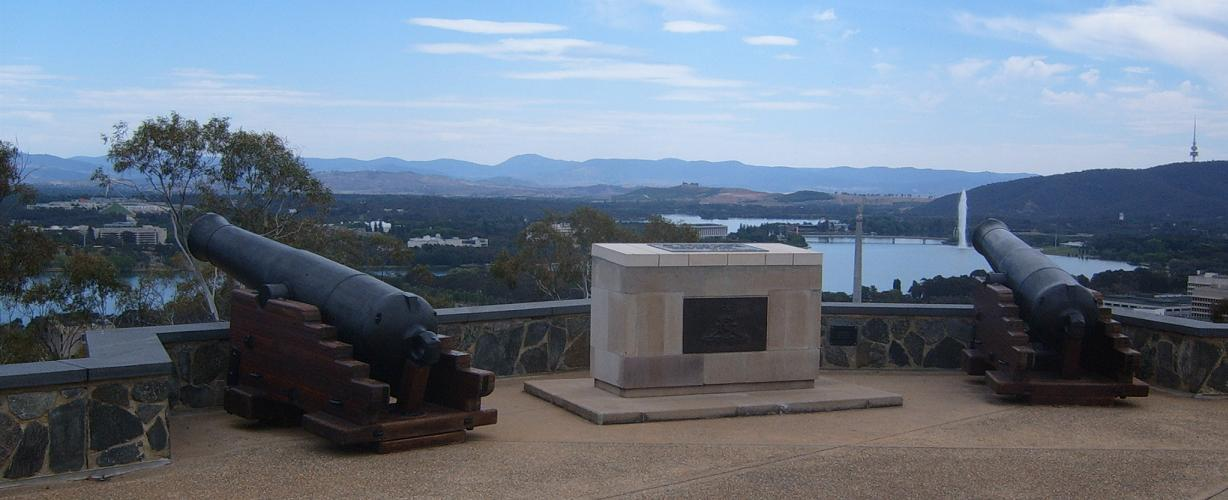
Artillery Memorial, Canberra

=== Regular Army ===
Major units of the Royal Australian Artillery include:

- 1st Regiment, Royal Australian Artillery – attached to the 7th Brigade at Enoggera Barracks in Queensland.
  - 104th Battery
  - 105th Battery
  - A Battery
  - Operations Support Battery
  - Combat Service Support Battery
  - 1st Regiment RAA Band (Army Reserve)
- 4th Regiment, Royal Australian Artillery – attached to the 3rd Brigade at Townsville in Queensland.
  - 106th Battery
  - 107th Battery
  - 108th (Observation Post) Battery – attached to 2nd Battalion, Royal Australian Regiment
  - 109th Battery
  - Operations Support Battery
  - Combat Service Support Battery
- 8th/12th Regiment, Royal Australian Artillery – attached to the 1st Brigade at Palmerston in the Northern Territory.
  - 101st Battery
  - 102nd (Coral) Battery
  - 103rd Battery
  - 115th Operations Support Battery
  - Combat Service Support Battery
- 14th Regiment, Royal Australian Artillery – attached to the 10th Fire Brigade - is the Australian Army's only long-range surface strike regiment. It is based in Woodside, South Australia. It was raised in early 2025, and its main sub-unit is 54th Battery. It is equipped with 4 (out of 42 ordered) M142 HIMARS MLRS, with the GLMRS and, in future, PrSM, equipping the launchers.
  - 54th Battery
- 16th Regiment, Royal Australian Artillery – attached to the 10th Fire Brigade - is the Australian Army's sole air defence regiment, and is based at Woodside, South Australia. Its batteries are equipped with the NASAMS III with AIM-120 AMRAAM and AIM-9X missile, the CEA Tactical (Hawkei) and CEA Operational (HX77) AESA radars. It is not clear if the older Giraffe Agile Multi Beam radar and AN/TPQ-48 Lightweight Counter Mortar Radar are still in service.
  - 110th Air Land Battery
  - 111th Air Land Battery
  - 1st AGO Battery
  - Combat Service Support Battery
- 20th Regiment, Royal Australian Artillery – attached to the 16th Brigade (Australia) - is the Australian Army's sole Surveillance and Target Acquisition regiment, and is equipped with Tactical and Small Unmanned Aerial Vehicles. It is located at Enoggera Barracks in Brisbane Queensland. It leads the Intelligence, Surveillance, Target Acquisition and Reconnaissance Cell within the 1st Division.
  - 131st Battery
  - 132nd Battery
  - Operations Support Battery
  - Combat Service Support Battery
- School Of Artillery - Home and training establishment of the entirety of the RAA corps, houses a 'Training' Battery. Which aids and supplements the courses that are ran and helps meet the Army training continuum standards. This Battery is almost identical to the rest but mainly focuses on the technical side of gunnery.
  - 53rd Battery

=== Army Reserve ===
- 9th Regiment, Royal Australian Artillery (HQ at Randwick Barracks, NSW, a direct command unit of the 2nd Division):
  - 2nd/10th Battery, Royal Australian Artillery – This is a single battery supporting the 4th Brigade at St Kilda in Victoria, and is equipped with the M252A1 81mm mortar.
    - 22 Troop (Mortar)
    - 38 Troop (Joint Fires Team)
  - 3rd Battery, Royal Australian Artillery – This is a single battery supporting the 13th Brigade at Irwin Barracks in Karrakatta, Western Australia, and is equipped with the M252A1 81mm mortar.
  - 6th/13th Battery, Royal Australian Artillery – This battery supports the 9th Brigade, and consists of three depots at Glenorchy (Hobart) and Launceston, in Tasmania and Keswick in South Australia. It has three joint fires teams and is equipped with the M252A1 81mm Mortar.
  - 7th Battery, Royal Australian Artillery – This is a single battery attached support the 5th Brigade at Pymble in New South Wales, and is equipped with the M252A1 81mm mortar.
    - 28 Troop – Dee Why
    - 113 Troop – Adamstown
  - 23 Battery, Royal Australian Artillery – This is a single battery also supporting the 5th Brigade at Kogarah in New South Wales and Canberra ACT. It is equipped with the M252A1 81mm mortar.
  - 5/11th Battery, Royal Australian Artillery – This a single battery supporting the 11th Brigade at Gallipoli Barracks and Southport, in Queensland. Equipped with the M252A1 81mm mortar.

== Banners of the Royal Regiment of Australian Artillery ==
The Royal Regiment of Australian Artillery is the only Regiment of Artillery of the nations of the Commonwealth of Nations to have been presented with The Banner of Queen Elizabeth II.

The Queen's Banner was presented to the Regiment on 1 August 1971, replacing the King's Banner. The silver plaque fixed to the Banner pike reads "Presented by Her Most Gracious Majesty Queen Elizabeth II, Captain General of The Regiment of Royal Australian Artillery, to replace the Banner presented by His Majesty King Edward VII and in Honour of the Centenary of the Regiment 1971."

The King's Banner was presented in November 1904 by the Governor General Lord Northcote. The silver plaque reads "Presented by His Gracious Majesty the King Emperor to the Royal Australian Artillery in recognition of the services rendered to the Empire in South Africa 1904". The artillery units or sub-units that served in this war were A Battery, NSW Regiment RAA, and the Machine Gun Section, Queensland Regiment RAA, although many Gunners, permanent and militia, enlisted in the various colonial contingents, and after Federation the battalions of Australian Commonwealth Horse, that served in South Africa.

== Traditions ==
- Battle Honour – UBIQUE – Latin :meaning "Everywhere".
- Captain General of the Royal Regiment of Australian Artillery – His Majesty King Charles III.
- Head of Regiment – the senior serving RAA officer who is appointed by the Chief of Army to be his adviser on RAA Regimental matters.
- Motto – "QUO FAS ET GLORIA DUCUNT" – Meaning 'Whither right and glory lead'. The motto of the RAA from 1903 was CONSENSU STABILES, meaning "Strong in Agreement", previously carried by the Queensland Regiment of RAA. The permanent, militia and volunteer artillery units of the Australian colonies and the Australian Commonwealth have carried many mottoes in the past. The motto QUO FAS ET GLORIA DUCUNT was granted to the RAA by King George VI in December 1949 and notification of approval was given in AAO 6/1950.
- The Regimental Colours – In times past infantry Regiments carried Colours to serve as rallying points in battle. The rallying point in battle for Gunners is their guns. Thus the guns are the artillery Colours. Abandoning guns is, in the Artillery considered tantamount to abandoning colours in other combat Corps although in reality the RAA has had to abandon guns on several occasions in the past as a result of their destruction or their inability to be removed from their gun positions. There has been no shame associated with these actions, in all cases the guns are rendered unserviceable prior to abandonment.
- Current Australian manufactured guns symbolically have the national Coat of Arms engraved on the barrels.
- Troops stand to attention when being passed by the guns when on parade as the guns are the ceremonial colours of Artillery.
- It is considered rude and insulting to the colours to lean on or rest against a gun.
- Patron Saint – Saint Barbara, Protector from fire and explosion.
- Regimental birthday – 1 August.
- Regimental Marching Tune – "The British Grenadiers".
- Takes precedence on parade after units of the Royal Australian Armoured Corps. Artillery units on parade with their guns take place to the right of units parading without their guns.
- The hat badge of the Royal Australian Artillery was approved in June 1930 with the battle honour UBIQUE in the upper scroll surmounted by an Imperial crown, and the motto CONSENSU STABILES and the word AUSTRALIA in the lower scrolls. In 1951 a design with QUO FAS ET GLORIA DUCUNT replaced the wording in the lower scrolls but this was never manufactured or issued. The current design with the St Edwards crown and QUO FAS ET GLORIA DUCUNT in the lower scrolls was approved in 1954.
- Officers and Warrant Officers Class One wear a bursting 7-flamed grenade with a scroll bearing the Battle Honour UBIQUE on the collars of ceremonial uniforms. Other ranks wear a collar badge comprising the cypher 'RAA' above a scroll bearing the RAA motto.
- Ceremonial colours – Red over blue.

Regimental lanyard colour - White

This colour was officially adopted in 1952 by officers, warrant officers and non-commissioned officers of the RAA who were required to carry whistles as part of their duties and the lanyard was worn looped around the right shoulder. In 1950, officers, warrant officers, and non-commissioned officers of the RAA required to carry whistles in the exercise of their command functions had been authorised to wear a braided scarlet lanyard but although the item was supplied, it is thought that this instruction was widely ignored. In 1956 wearing of the white lanyard was extended to all ranks. A Battery RAA were given permission to wear their lanyard on the left shoulder in 1963, confirming an unofficial practice continued from 1931, and perpetuating a local authority for other ranks of both 7th Light Horse Regiment and the then 1st Battery, Royal Australian Field artillery, to wear a white lanyard while they were functioning as the escort to the Duke of York, the future King George VI, when he opened the first Parliament in Canberra in 1927. The first lanyards issued to Australian artillerymen, from as early as 1886, were for permanent gunners to carry their clasp knife and were never worn on full dress or ceremonial uniform nor were they worn by officers. They were never bleached or blancoed white and do not appear to have been worn looped around the shoulder. During the Great War gunners of the Australian Imperial Force serving abroad began to unofficially adopt white or khaki braided cord lanyards, or plaited leather lanyards, on their best uniforms while on leave or for carrying whistles. There was no laid down policy and these were worn on either left or right shoulder according to personal preference. After the war the practice was continued by other ranks of the permanent and militia artillery and the lanyard was usually worn on the left shoulder. This practice was unofficial although in 1925 personnel who carried whistles on duty were allowed to wear lanyards in the colour of the uniform, i.e., khaki. In 1931 these lanyards were authorised to be worn on the right shoulder although 1st Field Cadre RAA continued to wear them on the left. White lanyards were worn unofficially by artillery, light horse, Corps of Signals, infantry, and Australian Army Service Corps, during the 1920s and 1930s and the practice ceased at the start of the Second World War. The Australian Tank Corps wore it on the left shoulder during the 1930s. The white lanyard worn by the Royal Australian Artillery has nothing whatsoever to do with the Boer War, nor was it ever used for carrying pocket knives or fuze keys. It began being worn unofficially as an embellishment during the Great War, became a functional item for carrying whistles after the Second World War, and subsequently reverted to an embellishment.

== Affiliations ==
- United Kingdom – Royal Regiment of Artillery
- Canada – Royal Regiment of Canadian Artillery
- New Zealand – Royal Regiment of New Zealand Artillery

== Order of precedence ==
Preceded by Royal Australian Armoured Corps	Australian Army Order of Precedence	Succeeded by Royal Australian Engineers

== See also ==
- Australian Army Artillery Units, World War I
- Australian Army Artillery Museum
- List of guns and mortars used by the Royal Regiment of Australian Artillery
