= Amy Gillett =

Australian rower and cyclist (1976–2005)

Personal information
- Full name: Amy Elizabeth Gillett
- Born: Amy Elizabeth Safe; 9 January 1976 Adelaide, South Australia, Australia
- Died: 18 July 2005 (aged 29) Zeulenroda, Germany

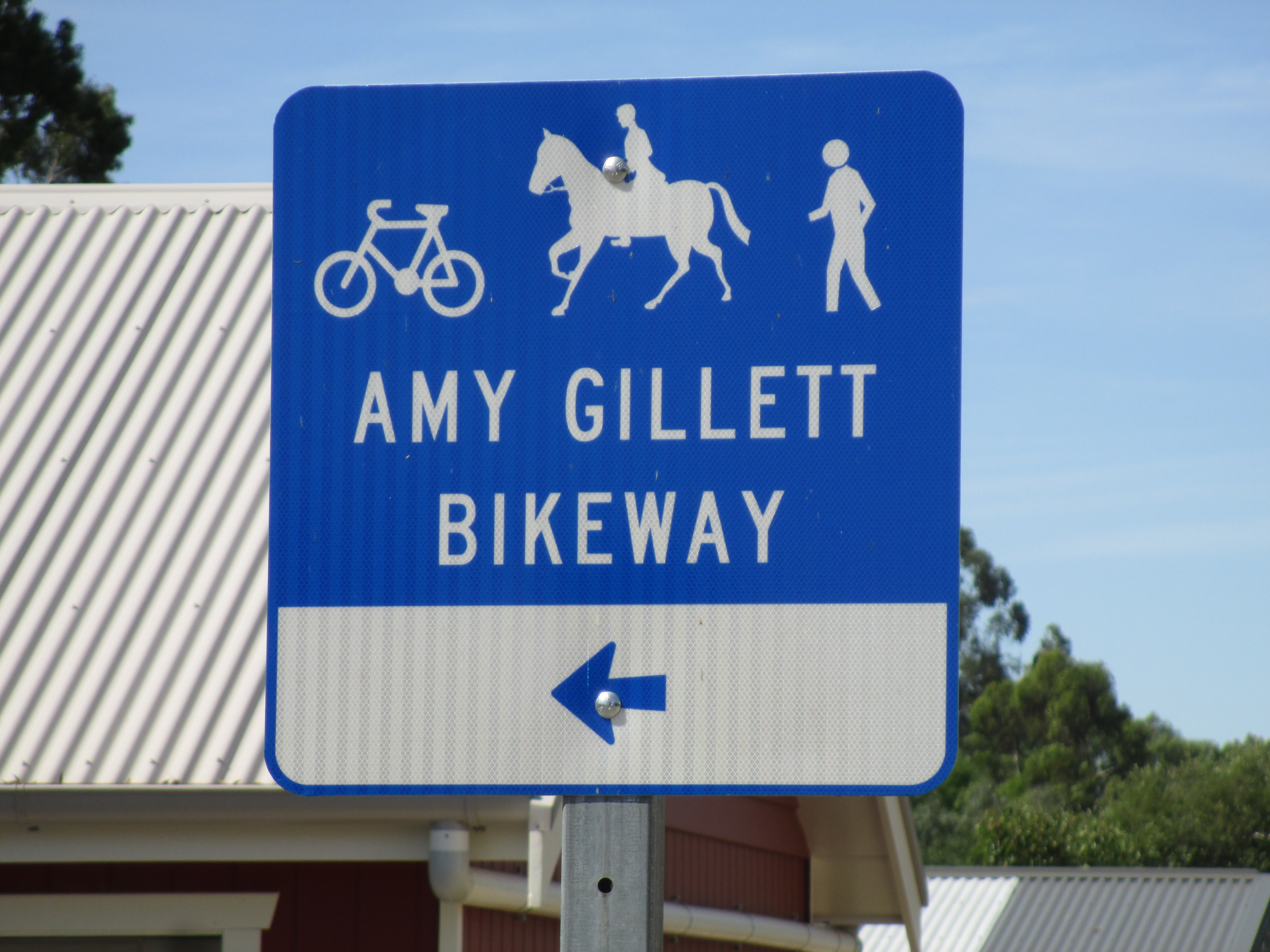
Bikeway named in Amy Gillett's honour

Amy Elizabeth Gillett (née Safe; 9 January 1976 – 18 July 2005) was an Australian track cyclist and rower who represented Australia in both sports. She was killed when a driver crashed into the Australian squad of cyclists with whom she was training in Germany. The Amy Gillett Foundation was established in order to fund road safety programs and provide scholarships for young female cyclists.

== Life ==
Gillett was born in Adelaide and was educated at Annesley College. She was a world champion junior rower, winning a gold medal in the coxless pair in the Junior World Championships in 1993 and the women's single scull in 1994. She came fifth in the single scull in the Nations Cup held in Paris the same year.

At 20, she was a member of the Australian women's eight at the Atlanta Olympics. She was coached by Simon Gillett during her rowing career and later married him in January 2004, moving to Mount Helen near Ballarat, Victoria. After failing to make the Australian rowing team for the Sydney Olympics she quit the sport but was identified as a cyclist with potential. She was an Australian Institute of Sport rowing and cycling scholarship holder.

In 2002, Gillett was first in the Individual Pursuit Australian Titles, held in Victoria. From 2002 to 2005, she was a member of the Australian Institute of Sport elite cycling squad and represented Australia in the 2002 and 2003 Cycling World Cups. While she was not a member of the Australian cycling team for the 2004 Athens Olympics, her results during 2005 were steadily improving including a third place in the 2005 Road Time Trial Australian Open Titles. She was rated as one of the top 100 women road cyclists at the time of her death and Australian cycling officials had identified her as a potential medallist in the 2006 Commonwealth Games in the time trial. Gillett was also undertaking a doctorate at the University of South Australia at the time of her death.

== Death ==
Gillett died after a collision near Zeulenroda, Germany, on 18 July 2005, when a young driver lost control of her car and drove head first into six members of the Australian women's cycling squad, who were preparing for the Thüringen Rundfahrt der Frauen stage race. Five of Gillett's Australian teammates suffered injuries, most very serious. Katie Brown, Lorian Graham, Kate Nichols, Alexis Rhodes, and Louise Yaxley were taken immediately to hospital, with Rhodes and Yaxley suffering major trauma. Graham and Brown had incurred fractures and Nichols had torn tendons requiring surgery. The newly qualified driver was fined €1,440 and disqualified from driving for eight months.

== Foundation ==
Simon Gillett and the Australian Cycling Federation subsequently established the Amy Gillett Foundation.

The foundation's aims are to:

- provide financial support for the rehabilitation of Gillett's five injured team members;
- fund and administer a scholarship program for young women cyclists to support their sporting and academic endeavours
- support and promote projects aimed at road safety awareness amongst cyclists and motorists

In 2018, the way the scholarship was awarded and operated changed, as Cycling Australia pulled direct support for the Australian development teams with whom the scholarship recipient would have normally. Previously the scholarship recipient was selected by a panel from applications to the foundation, but in 2018 recipient was selected to race as a part of professional team Wiggle High5. The Australian national development team itself had its own selection process prior to 2018.

Wiggle Amy's Gran Fondo cycling event, which benefited the foundation, was held in September along the Great Ocean Road, between Lorne and Skenes Creek. It is one of the only cycling events in Australia held on a fully closed road.

The foundation closed, in early 2024 due to lack of funding. Gillett's mother, Mary Safe, started collaborating with the Get Home Safe Foundation on a campaign to educate drivers to use the "Dutch Reach" when getting out of their vehicle, to better protect cyclists. In September 2024 the foundation was rescued from liquidation after receiving a number of large donations.

Recipients of the Amy Gillett Scholarship include:

- 2019 Sarah Gigante
- 2018 Grace Brown
- 2017 Lucy Kennedy
- 2016 Louisa Lobigs
- 2015 Kimberley Wells
- 2014 Lizzie Williams
- 2013 Jessica Mundy
- 2012 Jessica Allen
- 2011 Joanne Hogan
- 2010 Rachel Neylan
- 2009 Amber Halliday
- 2008 Carlee Taylor
- 2007 Carla Ryan
- 2006 Jessie MacLean

== Rail trail ==
In January 2010, the Amy Gillett Bikeway was opened at Oakbank, South Australia. The trail follows a section of the former Mount Pleasant railway line.

== See also ==
- List of racing cyclists and pacemakers with a cycling-related death
