= Alfred von Doussa =

Australian businessman and politician

Alfred von Doussa MLC
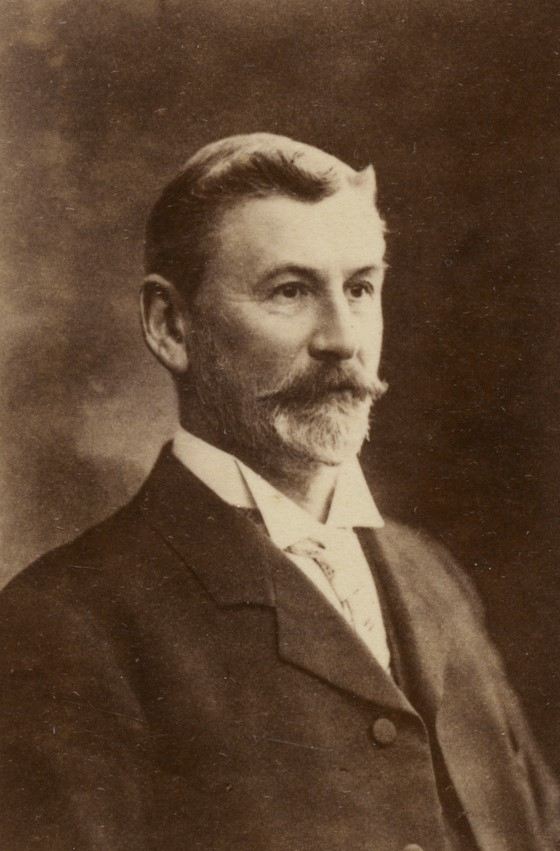
- Born: 27 April 1848; Adelaide, South Australia, Australia
- Died: 1 August 1926 (aged 78); Hahndorf, South Australia
- Occupations: businessman, politician
- Spouse: Helena Theresa von Doussa nee Doudy (1854–1926)
- Children: Alice Maud Mary Cowan (1890–1927), Dorothea Jay (1892–1970), Louis Alfred Von Doussa (1894–1963)
- Parent(s): Emil Louis (Alfred) von Doussa and Anna Dorothea von Doussa, (née Schach)

Member for Gumeracha
- In office 1901–1921

Heinrich Albert Alfred von Doussa (27 April 1848 – 1 August 1926) was an Australian businessman and politician. He was a member of the South Australian Legislative Council from 1901 to 1921, representing Southern District.

== History ==
Von Doussa was born in Adelaide the son of (Emil Louis) Alfred von Doussa (c. 1809 – 17 December 1882), an officer of the Prussian army, who emigrated to South Australia in 1846, aboard Heloise, arriving in March 1847 after a five-month voyage. His wife-to-be, Anna Dorothea Schach was a fellow passenger; they married that same year. Alfred was educated at T. W. Boehm's German School in Hahndorf and St Peter's College. He and his father travelled to Otago, New Zealand at the time of the gold rush. On returning to South Australia he studied chemistry, and in 1868 was partner (with Carl Friedrich Gunther) in the Rundle Street pharmacy of Gunther and von Doussa. The partnership was dissolved in October 1869.

== Politics ==
He was elected to represent the Southern district in the South Australian Legislative Council in 1901, and was re-elected on several occasions. In August 1920, the Liberal Union refused to accept von Doussa's nomination for preselection for the 1921 state election when he refused to sign a pledge stating that he would not contest the election if he were unsuccessful in obtaining Liberal preselection. He subsequently contested the election as an independent, but was unsuccessful.

== Other interests ==
He was a founder, and for nearly 50 years secretary of the Onkaparinga Racing Club, which runs the Oakbank races every Easter. He was founder and for around 55 years Secretary or District Clerk of the Echunga District Council, (the longest period of any district clerk in the State), and secretary of the Mount Barker Agricultural Society for 20 years. He was an ardent Freemason, a member of the Prince of Wales Lodge at Mount Barker. He was a crack shot with a rifle, and member of the Hahndorf Rifle Club, and its "King" in 1879 and 1880. He was a keen cricketer, and for many years captained the Mount Barker Cricket Club. He held shares in several Western Australian gold-mines and was chairman of directors of Mount Benson Goldmining Co.

He died at his home "Detmold", Hahndorf (at that time renamed Ambleside).

== Recognition ==
The Von Doussa Steeplechase, conducted every Easter Monday at Oakbank, was named in his honour.

== Family ==
(Heinrich Albert) Alfred von Doussa (27 April 1848 – 1 August 1926) married Helena Theresa Doudy of Gawler on 5 October 1885. Their children included:

- Alice von Doussa (6 January 1890 – 19 June 1927) married Leslie Cowan of Erindale on 28 February 1911
- Dorothea von Doussa (7 November 1892 – 13 August 1970) married Dr. Hubert Melville Jay of Burnside on 14 November 1914
- Louis Alfred von Doussa (6 August 1894 – 4 January 1963) married Gwendoline Kathleen Hyman (1903–1992) on 16 February 1926

(Charles) Louis von Doussa (17 May 1850 – 27 May 1932), lawyer and politician, was a brother.
