= List of guns and mortars used by the Royal Regiment of Australian Artillery =

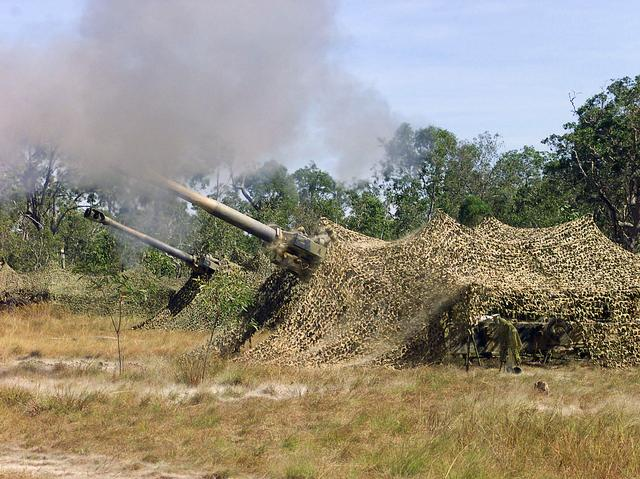
M198 Howitzers from the 8th/12th Medium Regiment firing during an exercise in 2001

The following is a list of guns and mortars used by the Royal Regiment of Australian Artillery (RAA) since its formation in 1901. The Regiment is currently undergoing a period of change, acquiring a new light air-portable 155 mm guns, precision guided munitions and a networked command and fire control system. Meanwhile, a number of Army Reserve regiments are re-equipping with mortars as part of a process of rationalisation.

== Guns and mortars used by the RAA ==
Weapon	Calibre	Origin	Type	In service	Notes
Guns
18-pounder QF Gun	3.3 inch (84 mm)	United Kingdom	Towed artillery	1906–1945	
4.5-inch QF Howitzer	4.5 inch (114 mm)	United Kingdom	Towed artillery	1916–1945	
8-inch BL Howitizer	8 inch (203 mm)	United Kingdom	Towed artillery	1916–1918	
9.2-inch BL Howitzer	9.2 inch (234 mm)	United Kingdom	Towed artillery	1916–1918	
6-inch 26-cwt BL Howitzer	6 inch (152 mm)	United Kingdom	Towed artillery	1920–1946	
60-pounder BL Gun	5 inch (127 mm)	United Kingdom	Towed artillery	1920–1944	
18/25-pounder QF Gun	3.45 inch (87.6 mm)	United Kingdom	Towed artillery	1940–1941	
25-pounder QF Gun	3.45 inch (87.6 mm)	United Kingdom	Towed artillery	1943–1975	
M1917/M1918 Gun	155 mm	United States	Towed artillery	1941–1945	
Short 25-pounder QF Gun	3.45 inch (87.6 mm)	Australia / United Kingdom	Towed artillery	1943–1946	
3.7-inch mountain howitzer	3.7 inch (94 mm)	United Kingdom	Towed artillery	1942–1943	
QF Pack Howitzer	75 mm	United States	Towed artillery	1943–1955	
M1 'Long Tom' Gun	155 mm	United States	Towed artillery	1943–?	
5.5-inch BL Gun	5.5 inch (140 mm)	United Kingdom	Towed artillery	1942–1983	
Yeramba SP 25-pounder Gun	3.45 inch (87.6 mm)	Australia	Self-propelled artillery	1949–1957	
M2A2 Howitzer	105 mm	United States	Towed artillery	1959–1989	
L5 Pack Howitzer	105 mm	Italy	Towed artillery	1963–1992	
M198 Howitzer	155 mm	United States	Towed artillery	1983–2010	
L119 Hamel Light Gun	105 mm	United Kingdom	Towed artillery	1988–2014	
M777A2 Howitzer	155 mm	United Kingdom / United States	Towed artillery	2011–Present	
AS9 Huntsman	155 mm	Australia / South Korea	Self-propelled artillery	2025–Present	
Mortars
2-inch Trench Mortar	2 inch (50.8 mm)	United Kingdom	Mortar	1916–1918	
6-inch Trench Mortar	6 inch (152 mm)	United Kingdom	Mortar	1917–1918	
9.45-inch Trench Mortar	9.45 inch (240 mm)	France	Mortar	1916–1918	
3-inch Trench Mortar	3.209 inch (81.5 mm)	United Kingdom	Mortar	1940–1942	
4.2-inch Mortar	4.2 inch (107 mm)	United States	Mortar	1942–?	
F2 Mortar	81 mm	United Kingdom	Mortar	2010–Present	

== See also ==
- Glossary of British ordnance terms
