= Balhannah railway station =

Former railway station in South Australia, Australia

Balhannah
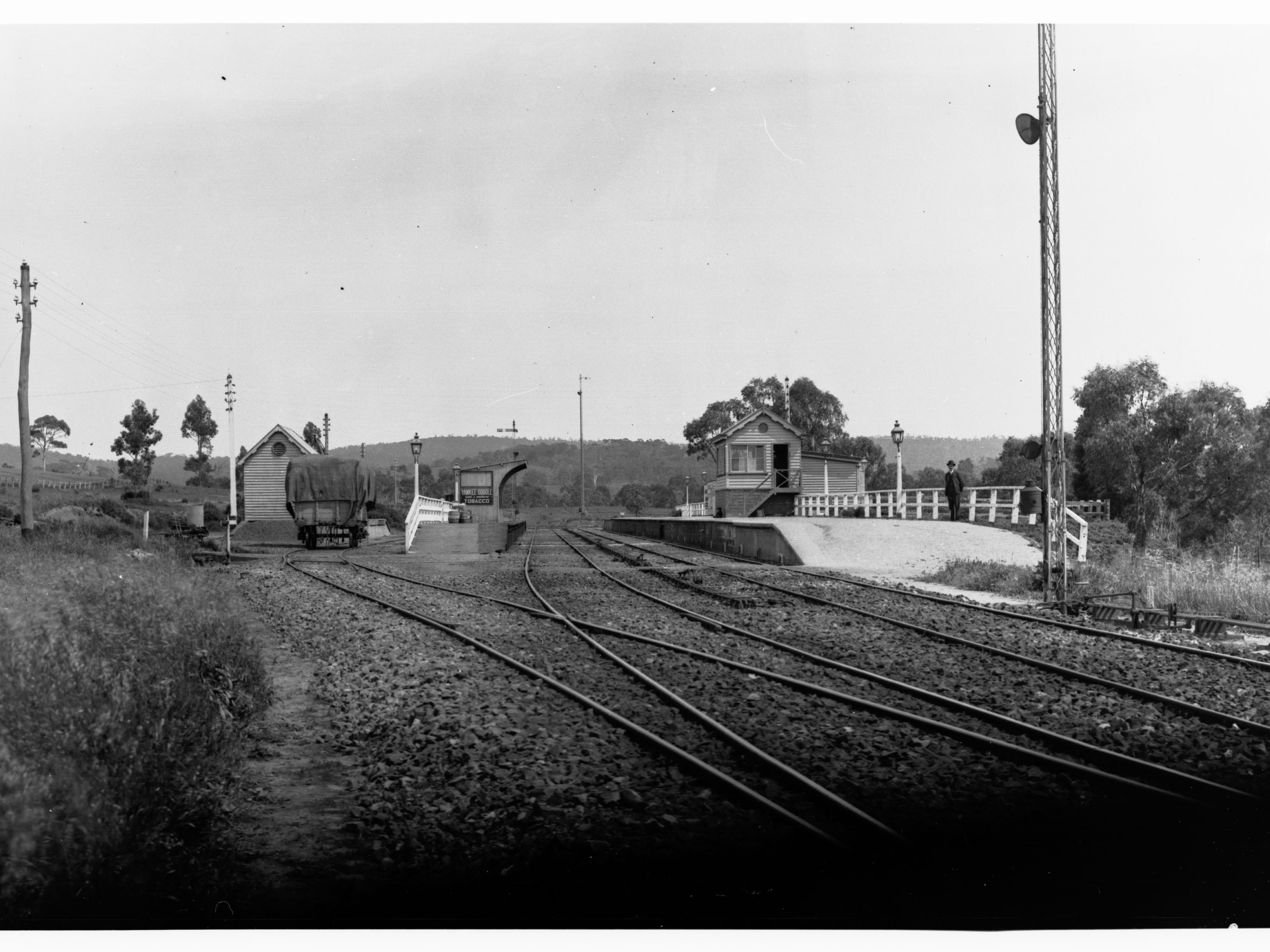

General information
- Location: Australia
- Coordinates: 34.996°S 138.8293°E
- System: Former Australian National regional rail
- Operator: South Australian Railways
- Line: Adelaide-Wolseley
- Distance: 45.8 kilometres from Adelaide
- Platforms: 3
- Tracks: 3

Construction
- Structure type: Ground

Other information
- Status: Closed

History
- Opened: 1883
- Closed: 1964

Services
Preceding station	Australian Rail Track Corporation	Following station
Ambleside towards Adelaide	Adelaide–Wolseley railway line	Mount Barker Junction towards Serviceton
Preceding station	South Australian Railways	Following station
Terminus	Mount Pleasant railway line	Oakbank towards Mount Pleasant
Location

Balhannah railway station is a disused railway station on the Adelaide-Wolseley line. The station is in the Adelaide Hills town of Balhannah, and is located 45.8 kilometres from Adelaide station at an elevation of 339 metres.

== History ==
The station opened in April 1883, originally with three platforms, the main platform of which had a weatherboard signal cabin, ticket office and the resident engineers office, like the one at Ambleside. It served as the junction station for the Mount Pleasant railway line between 1918 and 1964.

The island platform had a shelter shed, this smaller platform has been removed but is unclear when, probably around 1995. The goods platform and goods shed still remain. The yard layout has been rationalised in recent years, with the removal of the dead end siding at the eastern end of the yard, and the conversion of the goods siding to a dead-end siding, now used to stable track machines. The 80-90 metre long platform has since been fenced off due to safety and vandalism.
