= Oakbank Racecourse =

Horse racing venue in Adelaide, South Australia

Coordinates: 34°58′37″S 138°50′51″E

- Oakbank
- Interactive map of Oakbank Racecourse
- Location: Oakwood Road, Oakbank, South Australia
- Owner: Oakbank Racing Club
- Operator: Oakbank Racing Club
- Capacity: 70,000 (approx)
- Surface: Grass

Construction
- Opened: 1876

Oakbank Racecourse, also but less frequently known as the "Onkaparinga Racecourse", is home of the Oakbank Racing Club, a club which, until 2009, raced just twice annually, Easter Saturday and Easter Monday at the Oakbank Easter Racing Carnival, and has done continually since 1876, except during World War II when it was held at Victoria Park and Morphettville Racecourse due to the army taking over the facility.

Located in South Australia's Adelaide Hills, it is the home of steeplechasing and jumping in SA, which combines with flat racing over the festival, including the famous Great Eastern Steeplechase and classic Harry D. Young Hurdle. Brooklyn Park Jockey Jack McGowan was a regular and prominent identity in the late 1800s and early 1900s on horses such as Strike and All Fours. Jack won the Harry D Young Hurdle on Jack Spratt and also run close seconds in the Great Eastern Steeplechase and Oakbank Hurdle on Edirol and Culleraine.

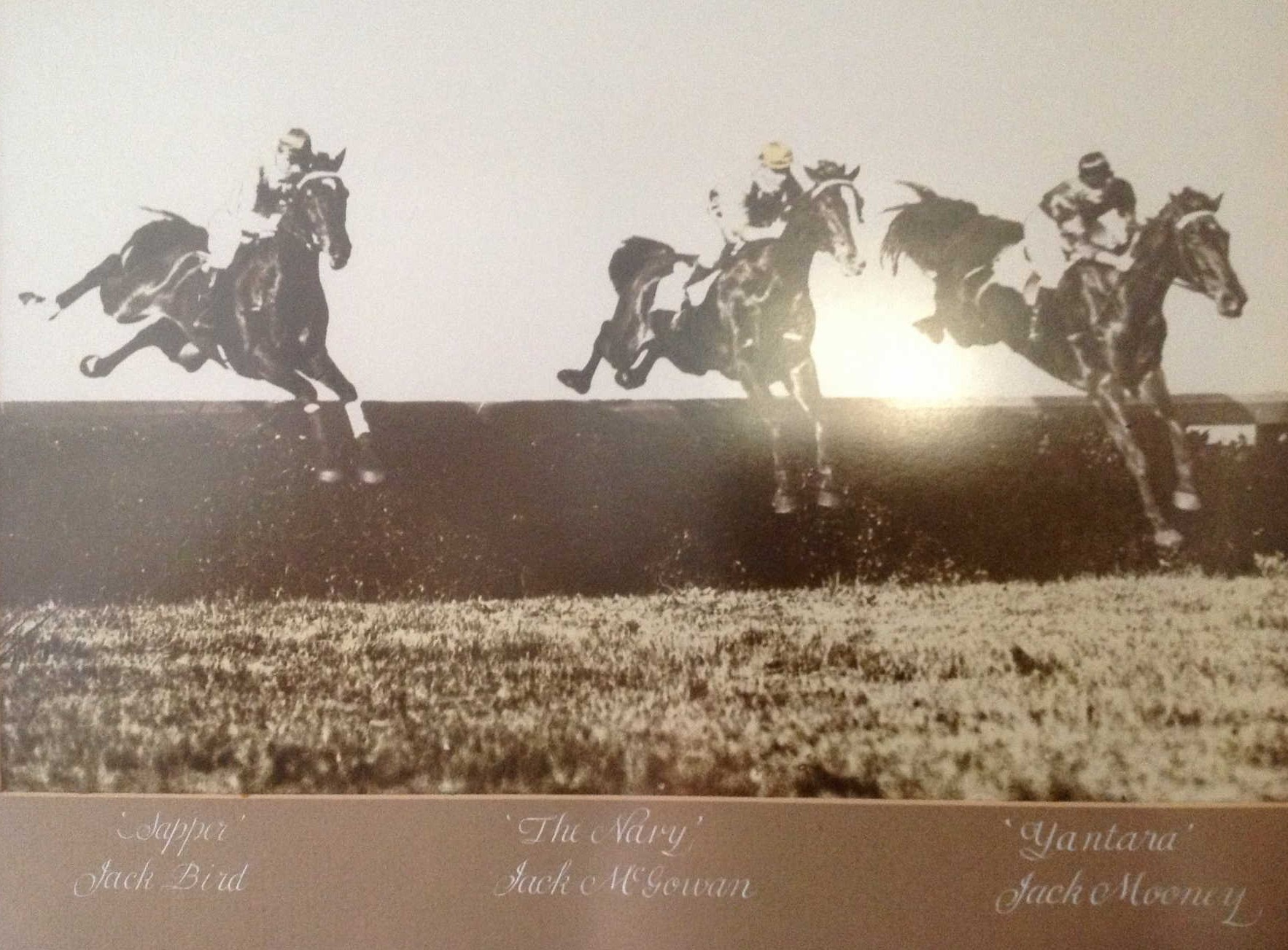
The 3 Jacks (3 well known Oakbank Jockeys of the early 1900s)

In 2019 Oakbank Easter Saturday was still South Australia's most attended race day in the SA racing calendar hosted by Oakbank racing club.

Oakbank Week is held each year on the Sunday, Wednesday and Saturday prior to Easter Sunday, except in 2020 when it was cancelled due to COVID-19. Easter Saturday at Oakbank now attracts crowds of over 20,000, when the feature Great Eastern Steeplechase is run. The racing carnival used to attract massive crowds, with about 40,000 attending the Saturday meeting and up around 70,000 attending on Easter Monday.

From 2009 the inaugural Oakbank Prelude Raceday has taken place two weeks before Easter, marking the first time that a separate meeting to the Easter Carnival has taken place at Oakbank. The famous Von Doussa Steeplechase is run on this program.

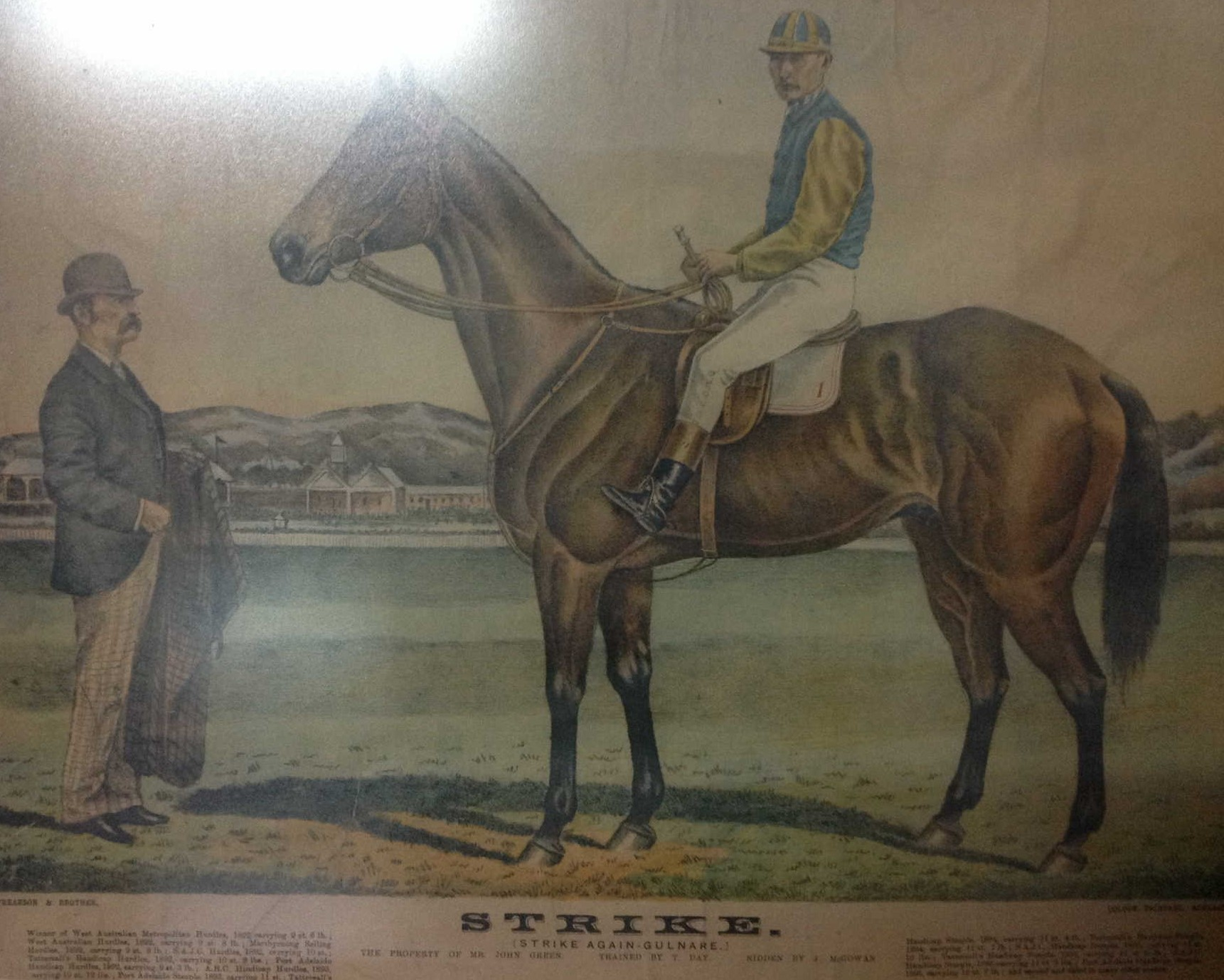
Oakbank regular "Strike" with Jockey Jack McGowan and Trainer (Jacks Father in Law) T "Johnny" Day. Day rode Nimblefoot to a win in the 1870 Melbourne Cup.

== Jumps-racing controversy ==
The Oakbank Easter Racing Carnival has received backlash from the RSPCA Australia, Animals Australia, and The Humane Society International Australia for the number of deaths associated with jumps-racing. There have been 7 reported horse deaths during jumps-races at Oakbank since 2010, including 2 in 2010, 1 in 2011, 2 in 2012, 1 in 2014 and 1 in 2017. In Australia in 2021, Victoria and South Australia are the only states where jumps-racing is conducted.

On October 1, 2021, it was announced that jumps racing will no longer be conducted in South Australia mainly due to the small number of South Australian jumps horses. There were plans to run the Great Eastern and Von Doussa Steeplechase as a flat race. However on 3rd March 2022 it was announced that would not happen. However, many jumps racing supporters attempted to keep jumps racing at Oakbank and that fight went into the South Australian Court System. That would result in an election occurring which the anti-jumps faction won but debate surrounding that vote spilled into more legal action. But not long after the South Australian Government stepped in and outlawed jumps racing in the state.
