= Oakbank Racing Club =

Australian horse racing organisation

Oakbank Racing Club, formerly the Onkaparinga Racing Club, is a thoroughbred horse racing organization in South Australia. It is responsible for the Oakbank Racecourse and running the events of the Easter Racing Carnival on that course, culminating in the Great Eastern Steeplechase.

== History ==
The Oakbank course had its origins in 1867, when a handful of enthusiasts, with the support of James and Andrew Johnston, proprietors of the Oakbank Brewery, decided to lay a track alongside the brewery for their own entertainment. Those involved were Andrew Johnston, William Tucker, Robert Correll (the local blacksmith), Michael Mullins, Frank Inglis, Thomas Ball and Seth Ferry. Other early supporters were Alfred von Doussa and Dr. Hermann Esau JP. Facilities at their meetings were makeshift: Dr. Esau, who was nearly always the judge, would stand on a brewery wagon, and the grandstand would consist of two or three brewers' vans drawn up together.

A race meeting was held on a paddock belonging to Lauterbach and Dohnt in 1868, but reverted to the Johnston property the following year.

Picnic races were held on Easter Monday annually from 1873.

The first Onkaparinga Handicap Steeplechase was run as part of the programme on Easter Monday 17 April 1876, and repeated the following Easter Monday, 2 April 1877 as the Great Eastern Steeplechase, which continues to this day.

Following the success of those events, a meeting held at Woodside on 20 April 1877, Dr. Esau presiding, determined on the formation of an Onkaparinga Racing Club to conduct races under rules of the South Australian Jockey Club. The first race meeting held under the auspices of the Club was held on 6 April 1878. Stewards included Andrew Johnston (1827–1886) and J. D. Johnston. The programme consisted of:

- Maiden Plate (15 sovs.) won by John Hill's "Glenelg"
- Handicap Hurdle Race (25 sovs.) won by Seth Ferry's "Star"
- Onkaparinga Cup (100 sovs.) won by J. D. Stehn's "Twilight"
- Great Eastern Steeplechase (100 sovs.) won by Seth Ferry's "Darkie"
- Flying Handicap (25 sovs.) won by R. Holland's "St. Barb"
- Members' Steeplechase (ridden by Club members; 30 sovs.) J. T. Fergusson on "Barney"
- Hack Race (10 sovs.), results not recorded.

The name of the Club was changed from "Onkaparinga Racing Club" to "Oakbank Racing Club" late in the 20th century.

== See also ==
- Adelaide Racing Club
- South Australian Jockey Club
