= Bird-in-Hand mine =

Former mine in South Australia

- Location within South Australia

Location
- Location: Woodside, South Australia, Australia; 34.956°S 138.903°E

Production
- Products: Gold
- Type: Underground

History
- Opened: 1881
- Closed: 1889

The Bird-in-Hand mine was an underground gold mine near Woodside in the Adelaide Hills east of Adelaide in South Australia. It was the largest of 17 gold mines in the area, and operated between 1881 and 1889. It produced 10,500 ounces (300,000 g) of gold at an average grade of 12.9 grams per tonne (0.46 oz/long ton) in the 1880s. The mine closed when the inflow of water made it uneconomic to continue, and miners moved to Broken Hill where rich ore had been found.

The mine was re-opened in 1934 with a Cornish pumping engine with a 4 feet (1.2 m) diameter cylinder and 6 feet (1.8 m) stroke able to pump 1,000,000 imperial gallons (4,500,000 L; 1,200,000 US gal) of water per day.

The Bird in Hand Winery is adjacent to the former mine site, and is named for the mine. Several of the wines are also named after former mines in the area.

Terramin Australia Ltd bought the site in 2013 and proposes to reopen the mine. It submitted a mining application in June 2019. Terramin's proposal is transport the mined ore to its facility at its former Angas mine near Strathalbyn for further processing.
