= Mount Pleasant railway line =

Former railway line in South Australia

Mount Pleasant Line

Overview
- Status: Closed and Removed
- Locale: Adelaide, South Australia
- Termini: Adelaide; Mount Pleasant
- Stations: Balhannah; Oakbank; Woodside; Charleston; Mount Torrens; Birdwood; Mount Pleasant

Service
- System: South Australian Railways
- Operator(s): South Australian Railways

History
- Opened: 1918
- Closed: 1963

Technical
- Line length: 33.8 km (21.0 mi)
- Number of tracks: single track

The Mount Pleasant railway line was a railway line on the South Australian Railways network. It was opened between Balhannah and Mount Pleasant in September 1918 and ran until March 1963 as a freight and passenger service. Part of its trackbed is now the Amy Gillett Bikeway rail trail near to Adelaide.

== History ==
The line opened on 16 September 1918 between Balhannah, 10 kilometres east of Mount Lofty, and Mount Pleasant. It had six stations and a number of halts; typically, the halts were located near level crossings. The six stations were Oakbank, Woodside, Charleston, Mount Torrens, Birdwood, and Mount Pleasant. The seven halts were Mappinga, Riverview, Kayannie, Muralappie, Milkappa Road, Crane Road, and Narcoonah.

The line was closed on 4 March 1963, and the way between Balhannah and Oakbank has mostly returned to private landowners.

== Rail trail ==
This former railway is in the jurisdiction of the Adelaide Hills Council, which in 2003 commissioned a feasibility study into the best use of the land. The report recommended it be converted to a rail trail, with which the council agreed but considered beyond their means to implement. However, since that time, the development of a rail trail led to the opening of the Amy Gillett Bikeway in 2010, named in honour of the late Amy Gillett, a South Australian-born Olympic cyclist who had died in 2005. As of 2015, the conversion had reached from Balhannah to Mount Torrens. The trail is in the process of being extended to Birdwood.

== Line guide ==
Station	Image	Opened	Additional information
Mount Pleasant		1918	Terminus; closed 1963
Birdwood		1918	Closed 1963
Mount Torrens		1918	Closed 1963
Charleston		1918	Closed 1963
Woodside		1918	Closed 1963
Oakbank		1918	Closed 1963
Balhannah		1883	Former junction station on the Adelaide-Wolseley line. Closed 1963
