= Woodside Barracks =

Australian Army base in Woodside in South Australia

- Woodside, South Australia

Site information
- Type: Army barracks
- Owner: Department of Defence
- Controlled by: Australian Army
- Condition: Active

Location
- Coordinates: 34°58′14″S 138°53′6″E

Site history
- Built: 1927
- In use: Yes

Garrison information
- Garrison: 16th Regiment, Royal Australian Artillery

Woodside Barracks is an Australian Army base located in Woodside in South Australia.

== History ==
The base was established in 1927, and known as Woodside Camp. It consisted of 162 hectares and is located 27 kilometres (17 mi) east of Adelaide, South Australia. The camp was used for the training of light horse and infantry units of the Citizens Military Force (CMF). With the outbreak of the Second World War, barracks buildings were constructed to accommodate up to four infantry battalions. The 2/10th, 2/43rd and 2/48th battalions of the Second Australian Imperial Force were formed at the camp. The base also provided training facilities for several CMF units and provided temporary accommodation for elements of the United States Army's 32nd Infantry Division when it first arrived in Australia in May 1942. The camp was converted into a refugee reception camp in 1949 and could house up to 3,000 people. After being vacated the camp was again pressed into military service. It was the home of 2 Field Ambulance, RAAMC before if moved to Ingleburn, NSW, and the location of the School of Military Intelligence in late 1960s.

From 14 October 1965, 3rd Battalion, Royal Australian Regiment (3 RAR) occupied the Kapyong Lines while training for operational service in South Vietnam. After the Australian withdrawal from Vietnam in 1973, a reduced strength 3 RAR remained at Woodside until the final elements completed a move to Holsworthy Barracks in 1982.

Between 1983 and 1987, Woodside was upgraded into a permanent barracks. Modern accommodation, recreation, training and workshop facilities were constructed for the 16th Air Defence Regiment. As of 2024, the Regiment, now known as 16th Regiment, Royal Australian Artillery remains the largest resident unit at Woodside Barracks.

== Facilities ==
The regiment's operations are supported by a state of the art simulation facility used to train soldiers in the use of the RBS 70 anti-aircraft weapons system located at Woodside Barracks.

== See also ==
- List of Australian military bases
