= Ambleside railway station =

Former railway station in South Australia, Australia

Coordinates: 35°00′16″S 138°48′27″E

Ambleside

General information
- Location: Australia
- System: Former South Australian Railways regional rail
- Operator: State Transport Authority
- Line: Adelaide-Wolseley
- Distance: 43.5 kilometres from Adelaide
- Platforms: 1
- Tracks: 1

Construction
- Structure type: Ground

Other information
- Status: Closed and demolished

History
- Opened: 1883
- Closed: c. 1965–66

Services
Preceding station	Australian Rail Track Corporation	Following station
Yantaringa towards Adelaide	Adelaide–Wolseley railway line	Balhannah towards Serviceton
Location

Ambleside railway station was located about 43.5 kilometres from Adelaide station, on the Adelaide-Wolseley line, in the Adelaide Hills suburb of Balhannah, at an elevation of 318 metres.

== History ==
Ambleside was opened in November 1883, and was located just north of Ambleside Road. It was named Ambleside which was the alternate name for Hahndorf during WW1. The station consisted of a ticket office, and a large shelter, similar to the one at Balhannah. A smaller platform and shelter shed were provided.

The station wasn't in a convenient location for passengers, which led to its closure around 1965–66 as a result of the SAR's scaling down of services. There is no evidence of the station left, as the main platform and associated infrastructure were removed sometime after 1966, and the smaller platform (plus the shelter shed and signs) was removed in the 1980s-early 1990s.

In 2011-2013 a crossing loop was built to split the long distance between Belair and Mount Barker Junction.

== Notes ==
- Callaghan WH. The overland railway. ARHS NSW, St James. 1992.
