= 16th Regiment, Royal Australian Artillery =

Australian Army unit

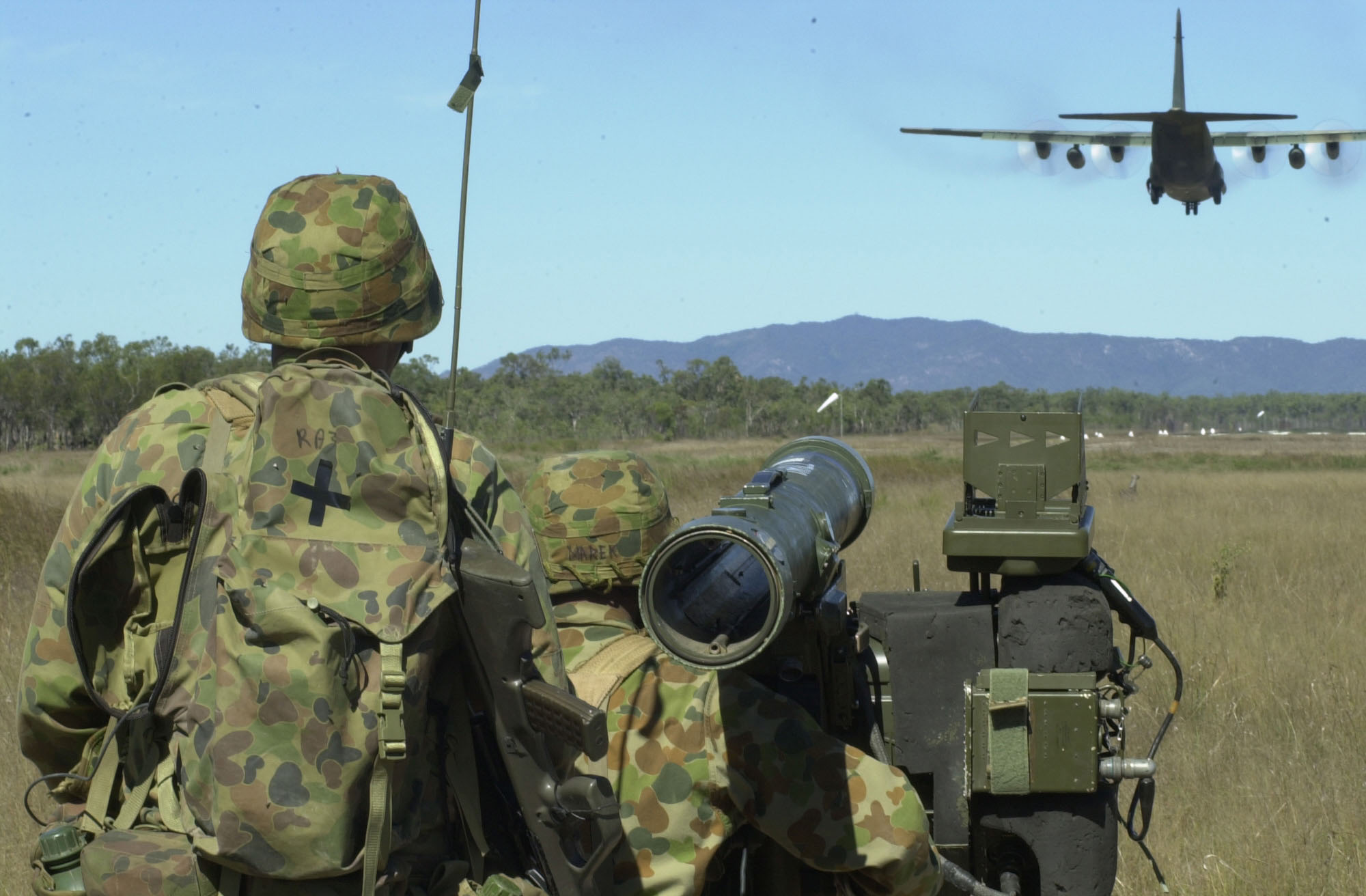
- A RBS-70 detachment training in 2001.
- Active: 2 June 1969 – present
- Country: Australia
- Branch: Australian Army
- Role: Ground based air defence (GBAD), sense warn and locate, ground liaison, JTAC
- Part of: 10th Brigade
- Garrison/HQ: Woodside, South Australia (current) RAAF Base Edinburgh (2025)
- Motto: Ubique
- Colors: Red over blue
- Mascot: Sergeant Murray
- Equipment: NASAMS, CEATAC and CEAOPS AESA radars
- Battle honours: Ubique

Insignia
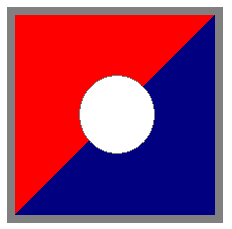
- Unit colour patch

The 16th Regiment, Royal Australian Artillery is the Australian Army's only ground-based air defence (GBAD) unit. It also provides sense, warn and locate, ground liaison, and joint terminal attack control capabilities. Part of the Royal Regiment of Australian Artillery (RAA), the regiment is responsible for protecting a wide range of military assets during both wartime and peacetime, ranging from Army units in the field to providing point defence to the Royal Australian Navy's support ships and air defence to Royal Australian Air Force air bases. Prior to being equipped with the currently in-service RBS 70 surface-to-air missile system, the regiment was equipped with the Rapier systems for 25 years. The regiment is based at Woodside, South Australia, but frequently deploys with other Australian and allied units on operations and defence exercises. The regiment is part of the 10th Brigade.

== History ==
The regiment has its genesis in the amalgamation of two previously independent batteries at Woodside Barracks in South Australia. On 2 June 1969, the 111th LAA Battery and 110th LAA Battery were grouped together to become the 16th Light Anti-Aircraft Regiment. The 111th had been raised in 1957 and had served in Malaysia during Confrontation during 1964–1966, while the 110th had been raised in 1965 and replaced the 111th in Malaysia in June 1966, but returned to Australia shortly afterwards after the conflict came to an end. Upon formation, the regiment was initially equipped with the QF 40 mm Mark XII anti-aircraft gun and was placed under the command of Lieutenant Colonel D.J. Ashmore. During this time, the regiment deployed small numbers of personnel to operate the Bofors guns upon the landing craft of the Royal Australian Engineers' 32nd Small Ships Squadron during the Vietnam War.

During 1971, the regiment experienced a manning shortage which resulted in the 110th Battery being placed in "suspended animation", as the regiment was only able to staff one battery. In 1973, the Bofors gun was replaced by the Redeye surface-to-air missile system. The 110th was re-raised in 1978 as the Army moved towards the purchase of a new surface-to-air missile system called the Rapier. At the same time the 111th was re-allocated to the 1st Division as a divisional air defence battery, although it remained under the regiment's command for administrative purposes. On 1 July 1978, the regiment was redesignated the 16th Air Defence Regiment.

In 1979–1980, the 110th Air Defence Battery also received the Rapier surface-to-air missile system. The following year, the regiment deployed the new capability in August during an exercise at Cultana with the first regimental firing taking place the following November at Beercroft. In 1984, the regiment undertook its largest exercise to that point, deploying to Darwin on 76 flat-bed trucks. The 111th Air Defence Battery replaced the Redeye with the RBS-70 surface-to-air missile system in 1987.

Four years later, in 1991, the regiment deployed detachments aboard HMAS Success and Westralia as part of Australia's contribution to the Persian Gulf War. After the September 11 attacks, A Troop, 111th Air Defence Battery was deployed at short notice to embark on HMAS Kanimbla to provide air and surface defence of her operations in the Persian Gulf. In May 2003, the regiment again deployed a detachment in support of the Royal Australian Navy when a detachment was sent on board Kanimbla during the invasion of Iraq. In 2005, the 110th Air Defence Battery replaced Rapier with the RBS 70.

The regiment committed air defence batteries to serve as infantry on Operation Astute on two occasions. In 2006, the regiment deployed the 111th Air Defence Battery to Timor Leste as Golf Company of the ANZAC Battle Group returning to Australia in mid 2007. Again in October 2008, the 110th Air Defence Battery was deployed as Golf Company, Timor Leste Battle Group Five, led by the 5th Battalion, Royal Australian Regiment returning to Australia in June 2009. On 9 December 2011, the 16th Air Defence Regiment was amalgamated with the 1st Ground Liaison Group to form the 16th Air Land Regiment.

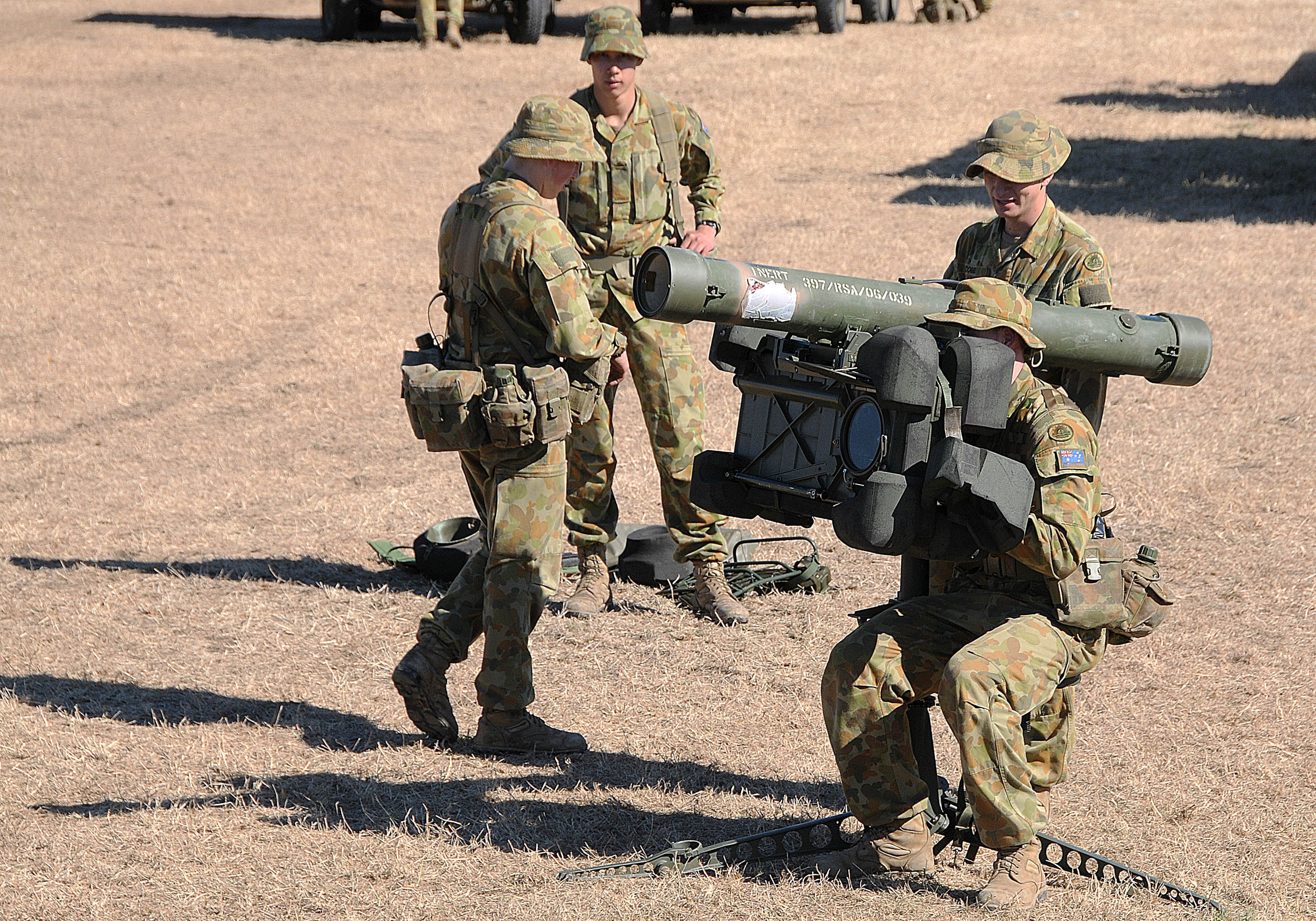
A RBS-70 team in July 2011

On 1 March 2010, the 16th Air Defence Regiment became part of the re-raised 6th Brigade. Later in December 2010 the unit deployed a contingent on Operation Slipper in Afghanistan, to man a Counter Rocket, Artillery, and Mortar system at the Multi National Base, Tarin Kot, once Australian forces assumed this responsibility from the Dutch. In 2012, GIRAFFE radars were also deployed. The majority of Australian forces withdrew from the Multi National Base Tarin Kot in December 2013. In July 2016, it was announced that C-RAM would be deployed to support Task Group Taji in Iraq. In July 2018, the regiment participated in Exercise Pitch Black alongside Royal Australian Air Force assets and personnel.

The regiment has regularly provided personnel to Operation Mazurka, where they are deployed in a peacekeeping role with the Multinational Force and Observers monitoring the border between Israel and Egypt in the Sinai. Under project Land 19 Phase 7B, the regiment will receive the National Advanced Surface to Air Missile System, which is scheduled for introduction in 2022–2023.

On 2 June 2019, the 16th Air Land Regiment was renamed the 16th Regiment, Royal Australian Artillery. It was transferred to the new 10th Brigade in December 2024.

Full operational capability for the NASAMS system is scheduled for 2026.

== Structure ==
The regiment currently consists of:

- 110th Air Land Battery;
- 111th Air Land Battery;
- 1st Air Ground Operations Battery; and
- Combat Services Support Battery.

Both the 110th and 111th Air Land Batteries are equipped with a number of systems. The primary surface-to-air system is the NASAMS, mounted on Hawkei vehicles and the HX77's chassis and trailers. The Australian Army received 7 Fire Units, split between the two batteries. The HX77-mounted CEAOPS radar provides long-range search and track, while the Hawkei-mounted CEATAC and an IRST system provides short-to-medium range search and track. These systems replaced the RBS 70, Giraffe Agile Multi Beam (G-AMB) radar and the AN/TPQ-48 counter-mortar radar. The 1st Air Ground Ops Battery is responsible for "the coordination and allocation of friendly air assets in support of the land force in the joint war fighting environment" and includes a troop of Joint Terminal Attack Controllers.

The regiment houses a training centre equipped with an Advanced Air Defence Simulator. This consists of high definition projectors inside a dome structure allowing a single RBS 70 detachment to simulate a realistic 360-degree training environment. The simulator is maintained by BAE Systems and was upgraded in 2011.
