= Ambleside, Ottawa =

Neighbourhood in Ottawa, Canada

Coordinates: 45°22′20″N 75°46′55″W

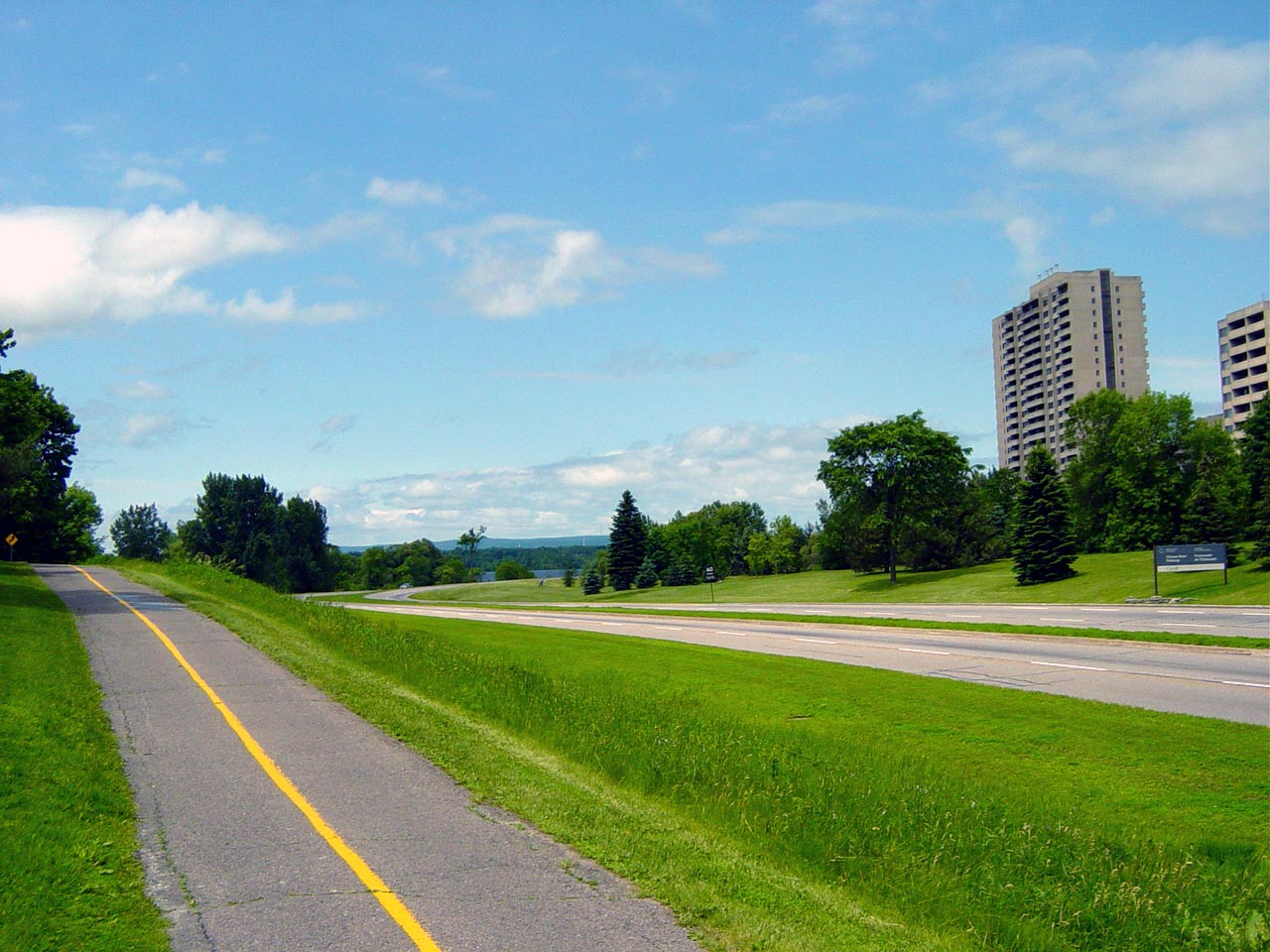
Kichi Zibi Mikan with high-rise apartments of Ambleside on the right

Ambleside is a small neighbourhood in the west end of Ottawa, Ontario, Canada. It is bounded on the West and North by the Kichi Zibi Mikan, on the East by New Orchard Avenue North, and on the South by Richmond Road. The total population of this area was 2,546 according to the Canada 2016 Census.

It consists largely of high rise apartments and condominiums, built in the 1970s, but has some businesses on Richmond Road. There are two small parks in the area, namely Ambleside Park and McEwen Park, along with the Kichi Zibi Mikan parkland which forms its northern and western edges. There are no churches or schools in its area.

It is served by the #11 bus on the south and the #153 bus on all its streets. A station, for the western extension to the new Light Rail Transportation system being built, is planned for New Orchard Avenue.
