= Woodside, South Australia =

Woodside
- Town
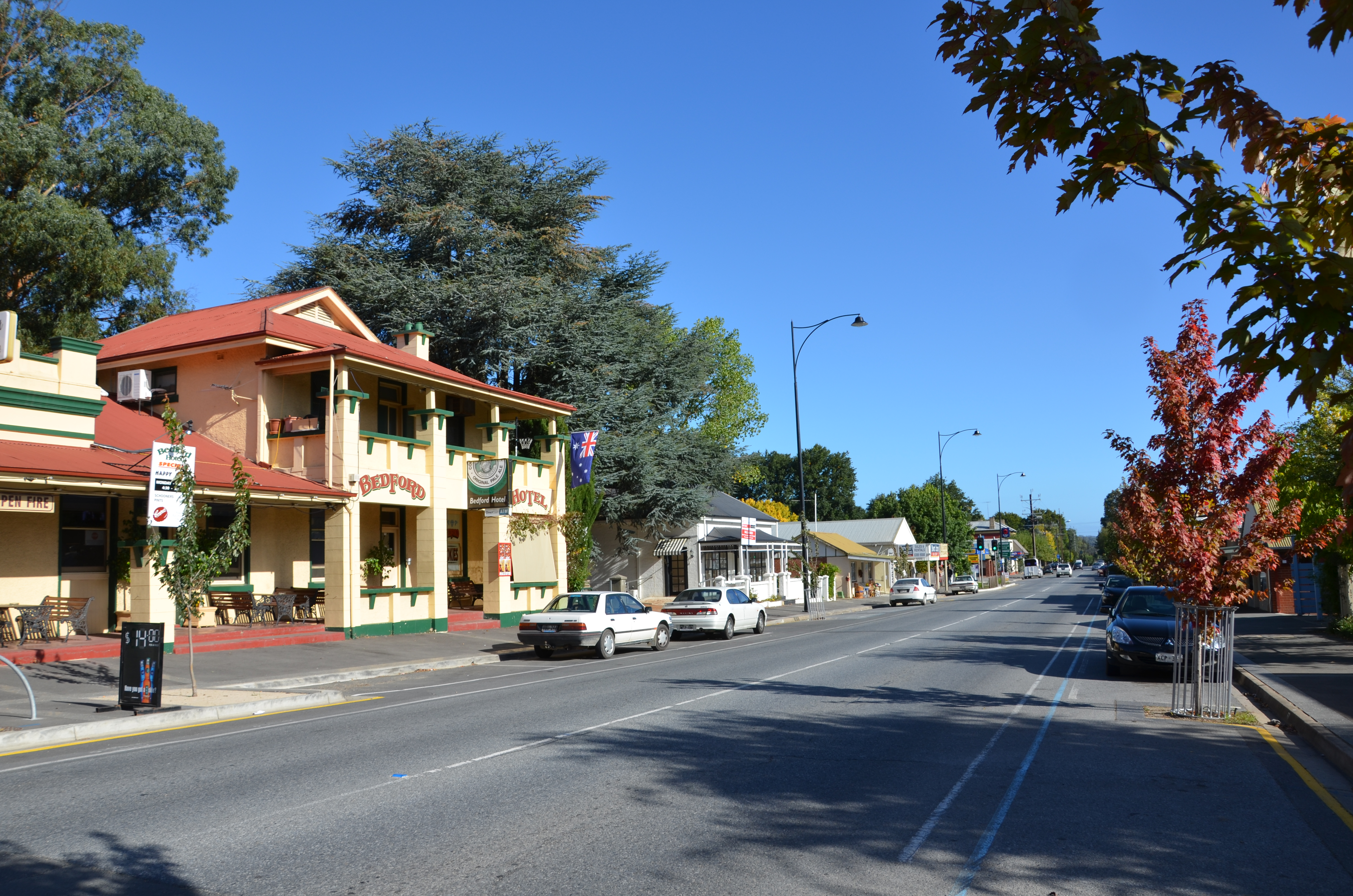
- Woodside main street

- Coordinates: 34°57′11″S 138°52′27″E
- Country: Australia
- State: South Australia
- LGA: Adelaide Hills Council
- Location: 37 km (23 mi) from Adelaide
- Established: 1850s

Population
  - Total: 1,890 (UCL 2021)
- Postcode: 5244
Localities around Woodside
Lenswood	Lobethal; Charleston	Mount Torrens
Lenswood; Oakbank	Woodside	Harrogate
Oakbank	Hay Valley; Nairne	Brukunga

Woodside is a town in the Adelaide Hills region of South Australia. The town is between Balhannah and Lobethal, 37 kilometres (23 mi) from the state capital, Adelaide. Mount Barker is also nearby.

== Description ==
The town is a useful traffic hub linking Oakbank, Lobethal and Charleston. It is on the Onkaparinga Valley Road, South Australian route B34, and is 25 km (16 mi) due East of Adelaide's CBD.

Amenities include a swimming pool, library, second hand store, grocery store, Cricket Club, tennis club, netball club, two pubs, lawyer, bowls club, and playing fields. Local businesses include Woodside Cheese Wrights, Melbas Chocolate Factory, a Lobethal Bakery and Bird in Hand winery.

It includes Inverbrackie, the site of Woodside Barracks which is the home base of the 16th Regiment, Royal Australian Artillery ground-based air defence unit.

Woodside Air Base was used by Aerotech for aerial firefighting, who relocated to Claremont Airbase near Brukunga in 2016.

== History ==
The first European explorers through the Woodside district were Dr George Imlay and John Hill in January 1838.

In 1839 the South Australian Company took out several special surveys which secured much of the central Mount Lofty Ranges and the sources of the Onkaparinga.

The Johnston family of Oakbank founded Woodside in the 1850s, primarily to improve their brewery business.

Gold was discovered in area. The largest mine was the Bird-in-Hand mine which operated from 1881 to 1889.

Annual motor races for bikes and cars were held on a street circuit in Woodside each October from 1947 to 1951 before the State Government banned the closing of public roads for racing.

The Mount Pleasant railway line served Woodside from 1918 until 1963.

There was an army base here. There was also an immigration detention centre here and it was open for many years.
