= Bird in Hand winery =

Winery in South Australia

Coordinates: 34°57′26″S 138°53′45″E

Bird in Hand is a winery located near the town of Woodside in the Adelaide Hills wine region of South Australia.

== History ==
The Nugent family, founders of Bird in Hand, have a long association with Adelaide through the health-care work of Dr Michael Nugent OAM, and his wife Joy Nugent, founder of Nurse Link. Bird in Hand's flagship wines, M.A.C Shiraz and Joy Sparkling Pinot Noir, are named for them. Son Andrew studied winemaking and viticulture at Roseworthy College, and worked in McLaren Vale before buying the Woodside property with his family in 1997. The winery was established in 1997 by viticulturist Andrew Nugent, with 40 hectares of vines planted on fertile land that was previously a dairy farm. The estate was named after the Bird in Hand gold mine, which operated near the site in the 19th century. The first vintage was released in 2001. The original dairy building was extensively renovated in 2007 to house a state-of-the-art winery, cellar door and hospitality centre, which also hosts concerts throughout the year.

Kym Milne MW has led the Bird in Hand winemaking team as Chief Winemaker since 2004. In 1991 he qualified as a Master of Wine (MW), becoming only the second Australian to pass the exam.

== Vineyards ==
The original vineyard (altitude 350m)is planted with Pinot Noir, Shiraz, Sauvignon Blanc, and Chardonnay. Bird in Hand sources fruit from a number of privately owned vineyards around the Adelaide Hills. Bird in Hand produces around 75,000 cases of wine each vintage, has four ranges of wines: Tribute Series (pinnacle), Nest Egg, (super-premium), Bird in Hand (premium), and Two in the Bush (entry level). (Nest Egg and Two in the Bush are also named after local 19th century gold mines).

== See also ==
- Australian wine
- South Australian wine
