= Oakbank, South Australia =

Oakbank South Australia
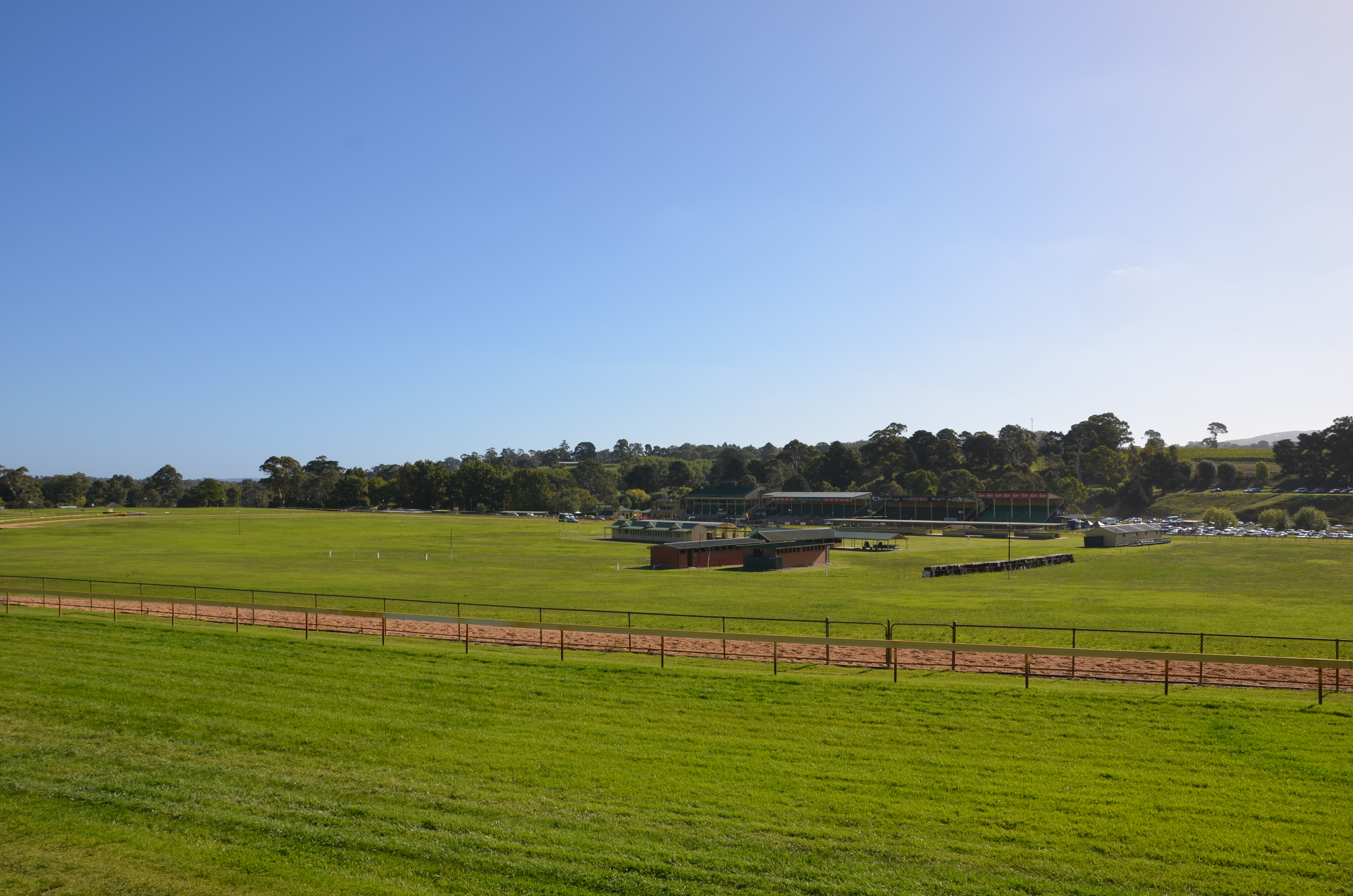
- Oakbank Racecourse

- Coordinates: 34°59′0″S 138°51′0″E
- Population: 865 (SAL 2021)
- Established: 1840
- Postcode(s): 5243
- Elevation: 338 m (1,109 ft)
- LGA(s): Adelaide Hills Council
- State electorate(s): Kavel
- Federal division(s): Mayo
Localities around Oakbank:
Carey Gully	Lenswood	Woodside
Balhannah	Oakbank	Inverbrackie
Hahndorf	Mount Barker	Nairne

Oakbank is a town in the Adelaide Hills, east of Adelaide in South Australia. It is in the Adelaide Hills Council area. At the 2006 census, Oakbank had a population of 473.

== History ==
The town was founded in about 1840 by Scottish brothers James and Andrew Johnston. The Johnstons had come out to South Australia on the East Indiaman Buckinghamshire in 1839, and by the following year were opening up the country in the Onkaparinga Valley near the present site of the township. The Johnston family hailed from Oakbank, Scotland district, and hence decided to name the new township Oakbank. A large oak tree that still stands in the main street of the town was reportedly grown from an acorn carried to Australia by one of the brothers

James and Andrew Johnston founded the J. & A.G. Johnston brewery in 1845, tapping an underground spring fed by the Onkaparinga River. A second brewery was built by Henry Pike in 1889, which he named the Dorset Brewery. Both breweries were forced to shut down in 1938 due to a virus in the yeast, and therefore both turned to making soft drinks and cordials instead. Johnston's Cordial is still a popular soft drink brand, and one of South Australia's oldest family-owned businesses. The Dorset brewery site now produces hand-woven textiles.

Oakbank is well known for the Oakbank Easter Racing Carnival. Held over two days during the Easter weekend, thousands of visitors come to see the premiere event, the Great Eastern Steeplechase. It is also on the Onkaparinga Valley Road, SA route B34.

== Railway ==
Oakbank was served by Oakbank railway station, part of the Mount Pleasant railway line from 1918 to 1963.
