= 2026 NBL pre-season =

Pre-season basketball tournament

2026 NBL Blitz logo sponsored by Code Sports

The pre-season of the 2026–27 NBL season, the 49th season of Australia's National Basketball League. Preseason games will begin on 6 August and end on 12 September 2026.

== Pre-season games ==
=== Games ===
6 August 2026	S.E. Melbourne Phoenix	113–60	B.League United	Wantirna South
19:00	Scoring by quarter: 34–13, 28–20, 20–11, 31–16
NBL TV	Pts: Glover 24; Rebs: Hunter 10; Asts: Dut 9	boxscore report	Pts: Arai 12; Rebs: Watanabe 5 Asts: Okada 5	Arena: State Basketball Centre; Attendance: n/a

9 August 2026	Melbourne United	83–68	B.League United	Port Melbourne
14:00	Scoring by quarter: 27–19, 18–24, 14–15, 24–10
NBL TV	Pts: Waardenburg 22; Rebs: Travers 12; Asts: Waardenburg 7	boxscore report	Pts: Arai 17; Rebs: Nakamura 6 Asts: Wakugawa 6	Arena: Courtside Melbourne; Attendance: closed event

13 August 2026	Illawarra Hawks	95–78	Saint Mary's Gaels	Wollongong
19:00	Scoring by quarter: 18–16, 21–19, 30–22, 26–21
NBL TV	Pts: Harvey 23; Rebs: Hickey 11; Asts: Hickey 7	boxscore report	Pts: Juzėnas 24; Rebs: Altuntas 8 Asts: Dent 6	Arena: Beaton Park Stadium; Attendance: n/a

14 August 2026	Sydney Kings	72–85	Saint Mary's Gaels	Moore Park
10:30	Scoring by quarter: 22–20, 17–20, 14–25, 19–20
NBL TV	Pts: Maluach, Stone 21; Rebs: Spurgin 7 Asts: Johnston 6	boxscore	Pts: Juzėnas 16; Rebs: Juzėnas 8 Asts: Ndong 5	Arena: Hoops Capital East; Attendance: n/a

16 August 2026	S.E. Melbourne Phoenix	86–64	Saint Mary's Gaels	Wantirna South
13:00	Scoring by quarter: 20–15, 18–18, 27–12, 21–19
NBL TV	Pts: Glover 19; Rebs: Daniels 8 Asts: Dut 6	boxscore report	Pts: Zougris 20; Rebs: Zougris 8 Asts: Bivins 5	Arena: State Basketball Centre; Attendance: n/a

19 August 2026	Cairns Taipans	91–79	Saint Mary's Gaels	Cairns
18:30	Scoring by quarter: 20–14, 27–15, 21–27, 23–23
NBL TV	Pts: Pinder 19; Rebs: Williamson 7 Asts: Bruce 9	boxscore report	Pts: Zougris 21; Rebs: Altuntas, Juzėnas 7 Asts: Zougris 3	Arena: Cairns Basketball; Attendance: n/a

22 August 2026	Perth Wildcats	102–87	Cairns Taipans	Karratha
12:00	Scoring by quarter: 37–21, 26–27, 23–25, 16–14
NBL TV	Pts: Dell'Orso 23; Rebs: Doolittle 9 Asts: Whitt 4	boxsore report	Pts: Smith 20; Rebs: Pinder 11; Asts: Bruce 6	Arena: Karratha Leisureplex; Attendance: n/a

22 August 2026	Brisbane Bullets	127–81	NBL1 North Select	Carina
19:00	Scoring by quarter: 31–17, 37–14, 25–26, 34–24
NBL TV	Pts: Harrison 24; Rebs: three players 8 Asts: Velička 13	boxsore report	Pts: Teys 21; Rebs: McDowell-White 7 Asts: McDowell-White 6	Arena: Southern Districts Basketball Association; Attendance: n/a

22 August 2026	S.E. Melbourne Phoenix	91–89	Melbourne United	Wantirna South
19:00	Scoring by quarter: 15–24, 26–19, 19–27, 31–19
NBL TV	Pts: Glover 23; Rebs: Glover, Goodrick 9 Asts: Glover 6	boxscore report	Pts: Oduro 15; Rebs: Travers 11; Asts: Ingles, Travers 4	Arena: State Basketball Centre; Attendance: n/a

25 August 2026	Illawarra Hawks	27–32	Sydney Kings	Wollongong
18:30	Scoring by quarter: 11–18, 16–14
NBL TV	Pts: Swaka Lo Buluk 8 Rebs: Blanchfield 5 Asts: Blanchfield 3	boxscore report	Pts: Johnston 6 Rebs: Stone, Wessels 4 Asts: Dellavedova 4	Arena: Beaton Park Stadium; Attendance: n/a
Note: Match abandoned due to slippery court conditions.

27 August 2026	S.E. Melbourne Phoenix	95–99	Cairns Taipans	Wantirna South
19:00	Scoring by quarter: 22–27, 30–30, 27–29, 16–13
NBL TV	Pts: Mays 19; Rebs: Schwartz 8 Asts: Mays, Sobey 7	boxscore report	Pts: Smith 16; Rebs: L.McVeigh 10; Asts: Bruce 11	Arena: State Basketball Centre; Attendance: n/a

29 August 2026	Melbourne United	113–97	Cairns Taipans	Cranbourne East
18:30	Scoring by quarter: 26–15, 31–28, 27–25, 29–29
NBL TV	Pts: Anthony 27; Rebs: Bowen, Oduro 8 Asts: Ingles 6	boxscore report	Pts: J.McVeigh 21; Rebs: Williamson 8 Asts: J.McVeigh 6	Arena: Casey Stadium; Attendance: n/a

8 September 2026	S.E. Melbourne Phoenix	100–103	New Zealand Breakers	Montmorency
19:30	Scoring by quarter: 32–25, 27–27, 26–24, 15–27
NBL TV	Pts: Glover 28; Rebs: Morin, Sobey 4 Asts: Mays 9	boxscore report	Pts: Vasiljevic 29; Rebs: Bediako, Mennenga 7 Asts: James 9	Arena: Montmorency Secondary College; Attendance: n/a

8 September 2026	Chiba Jets	45–98	Perth Wildcats	Okinawa
19:35	Scoring by quarter: 18–28, 13–22, 3–28, 11–20
NBL TV	Pts: Sato 17; Rebs: Sato 6 Asts: Togashi 4	boxscore report	Pts: Lual-Acuil 27; Rebs: Lual-Acuil 9 Asts: three players 2	Arena: Okinawa Arena; Attendance: n/a

10 September 2026	Melbourne United	86–90	New Zealand Breakers	Albert Park
18:30	Scoring by quarter: 24–25, 22–28, 24–20, 16–17
NBL TV	Pts: Goulding 26; Rebs: Krslovic, Wilson 5 Asts: Goulding, Ingles 4	boxscore report	Pts: Mennenga 26; Rebs: Bediako, Mennenga 5 Asts: Le'afa 10	Arena: Melbourne Sports Centre; Attendance: n/a

10 September 2026	Ryukyu Golden Kings	82–110	Perth Wildcats	Okinawa
19:35	Scoring by quarter: 19–31, 25–28, 13–31, 25–20
NBL TV	Pts: Cooley 19; Rebs: Cooley 6 Asts: Matsuwaki 5	boxscore report	Pts: Lual-Acuil 29; Rebs: Doolittle 7 Asts: Doolittle 7	Arena: Okinawa Arena; Attendance: n/a

12 September 2026	Tasmania JackJumpers	98–98	Sydney Kings	Sandy Bay
18:00	Scoring by quarter: 21–21, 28–31, 24–25, 25–21
NBL TV	Pts: Armstrong 20; Rebs: Armstrong 8 Asts: Marshall 6	boxscore report	Pts: Maluach 19; Rebs: Machar 7 Asts: Johnston 6	Arena: NJ Edwards Hub; Attendance: n/a
Note: Tasmania and Sydney agree to call the game with scores tied at the end of the fourth quarter.

12 September 2026	Brisbane Bullets	98–129	Cairns Taipans	Sunshine Coast
18:30	Scoring by quarter: 28–31, 21–36, 23–29, 26–33
NBL TV	Pts: Hinton 24; Rebs: Hinton 7 Asts: Velička 14	boxscore report	Pts: J.McVeigh 33; Rebs: Bolden, Lewis 6 Asts: Brown 6	Arena: UniSC Arena; Attendance: n/a

== NBL Blitz ==
The 2026 NBL Blitz is an annual pre-season tournament featuring all teams. All games will takeplace in Bendigo, Victoria.

This season all games will be played at Bendigo Stadium from 2–6 September 2026.

=== Blitz ladder ===
Pos	Team	Pld	W	L	PF	PA	PP	BP	Pts
1	Melbourne United (C)	2	2	0	200	180	111.1	6	12
2	S.E. Melbourne Phoenix	2	2	0	214	189	113.2	5	11
3	Adelaide 36ers	2	1	1	211	186	113.4	5.5	8.5
4	Brisbane Bullets	2	1	1	217	204	106.4	5.5	8.5
5	Sydney Kings	2	1	1	179	175	102.3	5	8
6	Cairns Taipans	2	1	1	171	194	88.1	4	7
7	New Zealand Breakers	2	1	1	170	181	93.9	3	6
8	Illawarra Hawks	2	1	1	198	202	98.0	2.5	5.5
9	Perth Wildcats	2	0	2	164	182	90.1	2	2
10	Tasmania JackJumpers	2	0	2	177	208	85.1	1.5	1.5

Updated to match(es) played on 6 September 2026. Source: nblblitz.com.au
(C) Champions

=== Blitz games ===
2 September 2026	Cairns Taipans	85–82	Perth Wildcats	Bendigo
17:30	Scoring by quarter: 15–25, 30–21, 17–16, 23–20
Disney+/Kayo	Pts: Smith 18; Rebs: Pinder 14; Asts: Bruce 6	boxscore report	Pts: Pepper 19; Rebs: Dell'Orso 9 Asts: Pepper 6	Arena: Bendigo Stadium; Attendance: n/a

2 September 2026	Sydney Kings	84–101	S.E. Melbourne Phoenix	Bendigo
20:00	Scoring by quarter: 28–25, 18–35, 17–19, 21–22
Disney+/Kayo	Pts: Cooks, Stone 15; Rebs: Cooks, Spurgin 7 Asts: Johnston 7	boxscore report	Pts: Aliir 14; Rebs: Aliir, Schwartz 8 Asts: Sobey 7	Arena: Bendigo Stadium; Attendance: n/a

3 September 2026	Brisbane Bullets	112–91	Tasmania JackJumpers	Bendigo
17:30	Scoring by quarter: 24–15, 33–33, 31–26, 24–17
Disney+/Kayo	Pts: Harrison 28; Rebs: Harrison 10; Asts: Velička 13	boxscore report	Pts: Armstrong 25; Rebs: Gold 11; Asts: Armstrong 7	Arena: Bendigo Stadium; Attendance: n/a

3 September 2026	Illawarra Hawks	100–99	Adelaide 36ers	Bendigo
20:00	Scoring by quarter: 27–27, 23–24, 19–20, 31–28
Disney+/Kayo	Pts: Doyle 23; Rebs: Froling 7 Asts: Hickey 7	boxscore report	Pts: Cameron 27; Rebs: Cheatham 16; Asts: Cameron 6	Arena: Bendigo Stadium; Attendance: n/a

4 September 2026	New Zealand Breakers	74–95	Sydney Kings	Bendigo
17:30	Scoring by quarter: 24–30, 20–21, 10–20, 20–24
Disney+/Kayo	Pts: Jackson-Cartwright 15; Rebs: Jackson-Cartwright 7 Asts: Jackson-Cartwright 7	boxscore report	Pts: Maluach 22; Rebs: Carr 8 Asts: three players 3	Arena: Bendigo Stadium; Attendance: n/a

4 September 2026	Perth Wildcats	82–97	Melbourne United	Bendigo
20:00	Scoring by quarter: 16–22, 28–23, 23–27, 15–25
Disney+/Kayo	Pts: Lual-Acuil 16; Rebs: Lual-Acuil 9 Asts: Doolittle 4	boxscore report	Pts: Travers 23; Rebs: Oduro 10; Asts: three players 3	Arena: Bendigo Stadium; Attendance: n/a

5 September 2026	S.E. Melbourne Phoenix	113–105	Brisbane Bullets	Bendigo
17:30	Scoring by quarter: 37–21, 30–33, 17–26, 29–25
Disney+/Kayo	Pts: Schwartz 17; Rebs: Glover 5 Asts: Daniels, Sobey 4	boxscore report	Pts: Velička 24; Rebs: Harrison 8 Asts: Velička 7	Arena: Bendigo Stadium; Attendance: n/a

5 September 2026	Adelaide 36ers	112–86	Cairns Taipans	Bendigo
20:00	Scoring by quarter: 31–23, 32–26, 27–12, 22–25
Disney+/Kayo	Pts: Cotton 22; Rebs: Rakocevic 13; Asts: White 4	boxscore report	Pts: Smith 14; Rebs: L.McVeigh 6 Asts: Brown 4	Arena: Bendigo Stadium; Attendance: n/a

6 September 2026	Melbourne United	103–98	Illawarra Hawks	Bendigo
14:30	Scoring by quarter: 21–19, 30–25, 25–34, 27–20
Disney+/Kayo	Pts: Oduro 22; Rebs: three players 10; Asts: Bowen 6	boxscore report	Pts: Martin 20; Rebs: Hickey 8 Asts: Hickey 6	Arena: Bendigo Stadium; Attendance: n/a

6 September 2026	Tasmania JackJumpers	86–96	New Zealand Breakers	Bendigo
17:00	Scoring by quarter: 19–22, 30–26, 16–23, 21–25
Disney+/Kayo	Pts: Armstrong 17; Rebs: Marshall 7 Asts: Armstrong 8	boxscore report	Pts: Jackson-Cartwright 23; Rebs: Bediako 10; Asts: Jackson-Cartwright 8	Arena: Bendigo Stadium; Attendance: n/a

=== Awards ===
The winning team will be awarded the Loggins-Bruton Cup, while the tournament’s most outstanding player will take home the Ray Borner Award.

- Loggins-Bruton Cup: Melbourne United
- Most Valuable Player (Ray Borner Medal): Luke Travers (Melbourne United)
