= 2026–27 NBL season =

49th season of the Australasian basketball competition

- Logo of the league sponsored by Hungry Jack's
- League: National Basketball League
- Sport: Basketball
- Duration: 19 September 2026 – 14 February 2027; 30 September 2026 – 21 February 2027 (NBL Ignite Cup); February 2027 (Play-in tournament); March 2027 (Semifinals); March 2027 (Finals)
- Games: 165
- Teams: 10
- TV partner(s): ESPN/Foxtel, Nine Network/9Go!, Sky Sport
- Streaming partner(s): Disney+, Kayo Sports, 9Now, NBL TV, Sky Sport Now

Regular season

NBL Ignite Cup

Finals

NBL seasons
- ← 2025–26 2027–28 →

The 2026–27 NBL season will be the 49th season of the National Basketball League since its establishment in 1979. A total of ten teams will contest the 2026–27 season.

As Australia and New Zealand will participate in 2027 FIBA Basketball World Cup qualification, the league will take a break during the FIBA international windows of 23 November to 1 December 2026 and 22 February to 2 March 2027.

== Teams ==
All ten teams from the 2025–26 NBL season will continue on in 2026–27.

=== Personnel and sponsorship ===
Team	Coach	Captain	Main sponsor	Kit manufacturer
Adelaide 36ers	(Australia) Trevor Gleeson	(Australia) Bryce Cotton	Revo Fitness	Champion
Brisbane Bullets	(United States) Will Weaver	(Australia) Mitch Norton	Verso Projects	Champion
Cairns Taipans	(Australia) Adam Forde	(Australia) Shaun Bruce	Kenfrost Homes	Champion
Illawarra Hawks	(United States) Justin Tatum	(Australia) Sam Froling (Australia) Tyler Harvey	Multi Civil and Rail	Champion
Melbourne United	(Australia) Jacob Chance	(Australia) Chris Goulding	Engie	Champion
New Zealand Breakers	(Canada) Gordon Herbert	(United States) Parker Jackson-Cartwright	Bank of New Zealand	Champion
Perth Wildcats	(Australia) John Rillie	(Australia) Jesse Wagstaff	Mate Internet Mobile	Champion
S.E. Melbourne Phoenix	(United States) Josh King	(Australia) Jordan Hunter (Australia) Nathan Sobey	Budget	Champion
Sydney Kings	(Australia) Brian Goorjian	(Australia) Matthew Dellavedova	Harvey Norman	Champion
Tasmania JackJumpers	(United States) Scott Roth	(Australia) Will Magnay	Spirit of Tasmania	Champion

=== Stadiums and locations ===
Team	Location	Stadium	Capacity
Adelaide 36ers	Adelaide	Adelaide Entertainment Centre	11,300
Brisbane Bullets	Brisbane	Brisbane Entertainment Centre	10,500
Cairns Taipans	Cairns	Cairns Convention Centre	5,300
Illawarra Hawks	Wollongong	Wollongong Entertainment Centre	6,000
Melbourne United	Melbourne	John Cain Arena	10,175
New Zealand Breakers	Auckland	Spark Arena	9,740
Perth Wildcats	Perth	Perth Arena	14,800
S.E. Melbourne Phoenix	Melbourne	John Cain Arena	10,175
S.E. Melbourne Phoenix	Melbourne	State Basketball Centre	3,422
Sydney Kings	Sydney	Sydney SuperDome	18,200
Tasmania JackJumpers	Hobart	Derwent Entertainment Centre	4,340
Tasmania JackJumpers	Launceston	Silverdome	3,260

=== Player transactions ===
Free agency began on 17 April 2026.

=== Import players ===
Team	Import players	Former players
Adelaide 36ers	(United States) Zylan Cheatham (United States) John Jenkins (Serbia) Nick Rakocevic	—N/a
Brisbane Bullets	(United States) Nate Hinton (Brazil) Raul Neto (IRP) (Lithuania) Arnas Velička (injured) (United States) Jaylin Williams	—N/a
Cairns Taipans	(United States) Jaylon Brown (Trinidad and Tobago) Malique Lewis	—N/a
Illawarra Hawks	(United States) Milton Doyle (United States) Kelan Martin (United States) Lamar Patterson (IRP)	(United States) Darius Days
Melbourne United	(United States) Cole Anthony (United States) Josh Oduro	—N/a
New Zealand Breakers	(Canada) Charles Bediako (United States) Parker Jackson-Cartwright (injured) (United States) Josiah-Jordan James (injured) (United States) Skylar Mays (IRP) (Germany) Nelson Weidemann (IRP)	—N/a
Perth Wildcats	(United States) Kristian Doolittle (United States) Brandon Knight (United States) Jimmy Whitt (NRP) (United States) Dylan Windler	—N/a
S.E. Melbourne Phoenix	(France) Yannis Morin (United States) D'Shawn Schwartz	(United States) Skylar Mays
Sydney Kings	(United States) Andrew Carr (United States) Torrey Craig (United States) Kendric Davis	—N/a
Tasmania JackJumpers	(United States) Bryce Hamilton (injured) (United States) David Johnson (injured) (United States) Dakota Mathias	—N/a

=== Coaching transactions ===
Head coaching transactions
Team	2025–26 season	2026–27 season
Off-season
Adelaide 36ers	Mike Wells	Trevor Gleeson
Brisbane Bullets	Darryl McDonald	Will Weaver
Cairns Taipans	Adam Forde	
Melbourne United	Dean Vickerman	Jacob Chance
New Zealand Breakers	Petteri Koponen	Gordon Herbert
S.E. Melbourne Phoenix	Josh King	
Tasmania JackJumpers	Scott Roth	
In-season

== Pre-season ==
The pre-season games will begin on 6 August and end on 12 September 2026.

=== NBL Blitz ===
The 2026 NBL Blitz will run from 2–6 September 2026 with games being played at the Bendigo Stadium, Bendigo.

Pos	Team	Pld	W	L	PF	PA	PP	BP	Pts
1	Melbourne United (C)	2	2	0	200	180	111.1	6	12
2	S.E. Melbourne Phoenix	2	2	0	214	189	113.2	5	11
3	Adelaide 36ers	2	1	1	211	186	113.4	5.5	8.5
4	Brisbane Bullets	2	1	1	217	204	106.4	5.5	8.5
5	Sydney Kings	2	1	1	179	175	102.3	5	8
6	Cairns Taipans	2	1	1	171	194	88.1	4	7
7	New Zealand Breakers	2	1	1	170	181	93.9	3	6
8	Illawarra Hawks	2	1	1	198	202	98.0	2.5	5.5
9	Perth Wildcats	2	0	2	164	182	90.1	2	2
10	Tasmania JackJumpers	2	0	2	177	208	85.1	1.5	1.5

Updated to match(es) played on 6 September 2026. Source: nblblitz.com.au
(C) Champions

== Regular season ==
The regular season will begin on 19 September 2026. It will consist of 165 games (33 games each) spread across 21 rounds, with the final game being played on 14 February 2027.

=== Round 1 ===
19 September 2026	Melbourne United	95–97	Adelaide 36ers	Melbourne
19:30	Scoring by quarter: 23–25, 25–24, 22–26, 25–22
ESPN/9Go!	Pts: Anthony 30; Rebs: Oduro 6 Asts: Ingles 7	boxscore report	Pts: Cotton 29; Rebs: Rakocevic 9 Asts: Cotton 7	Arena: John Cain Arena; Attendance: 9,278

19 September 2026	Perth Wildcats	79–100	S.E. Melbourne Phoenix	Perth
19:30	Scoring by quarter: 24–19, 13–10, 25–16, 17–35
ESPN/9Go!	Pts: Doolittle 25; Rebs: Lual-Acuil 8 Asts: Doolittle 7	boxscore report	Pts: Krebs 25; Rebs: Daniels 12; Asts: Mays 6	Arena: Perth Arena; Attendance: 10,670

20 September 2026	New Zealand Breakers	95–81	Illawarra Hawks	Auckland
17:00	Scoring by quarter: 28–24, 26–23, 22–14, 19–20
ESPN/Sky Sport	Pts: Mennenga 27; Rebs: Mennenga 8 Asts: Jackson-Cartwright 13	boxscore report	Pts: Hickey 18; Rebs: Hickey 9 Asts: Hickey 5	Arena: Spark Arena; Attendance: 3,748

20 September 2026	Sydney Kings	111–90	Cairns Taipans	Sydney
17:00	Scoring by quarter: 32–26, 27–27, 31–20, 21–17
ESPN	Pts: Davis 26; Rebs: Cooks 7 Asts: Davis, Dellavedova 6	boxscore report	Pts: Pinder 27; Rebs: Bolden 13; Asts: Brown 6	Arena: Sydney SuperDome; Attendance: 13,632

21 September 2026	Tasmania JackJumpers	96–91	S.E. Melbourne Phoenix	Hobart
19:30	Scoring by quarter: 15–24, 23–28, 36–22, 22–17
ESPN	Pts: Johnson 26; Rebs: Johnson, Mathias 6 Asts: Johnson, Magnay 6	boxscore report	Pts: Glover 21; Rebs: Goodrick, Mays 6 Asts: Daniels 4	Arena: Derwent Entertainment Centre; Attendance: 4,340

22 September 2026	Brisbane Bullets	88–85	New Zealand Breakers	Brisbane
19:30	Scoring by quarter: 19–26, 18–18, 28–19, 23–22
ESPN	Pts: Velička 23; Rebs: Hinton 8 Asts: Velicka 14	boxscore report	Pts: Jackson-Cartwright 26; Rebs: Bediako 8 Asts: Jackson-Cartwright 7	Arena: Pat Rafter Arena; Attendance: 5,285

=== Round 2 ===
23 September 2026	Cairns Taipans	93–87	Tasmania JackJumpers	Cairns
19:30	Scoring by quarter: 32–16, 13–28, 21–22, 27–21
ESPN	Pts: Brown 20; Rebs: Lewis 10; Asts: three players 4	boxscore report	Pts: Armstrong 20; Rebs: Marshall 9 Asts: Armstrong 7	Arena: Cairns Convention Centre; Attendance: 4,636

24 September 2026	S.E. Melbourne Phoenix	61–86	Melbourne United	Melbourne
19:30	Scoring by quarter: 14–16, 21–29, 22–24, 4–17
ESPN	Pts: Aliir, Mays 10; Rebs: Hunter, Schwartz 7 Asts: Mays 5	boxscore report	Pts: Oduro 21; Rebs: Travers 10; Asts: Anthony 6	Arena: John Cain Arena; Attendance: 10,175

24 September 2026	Perth Wildcats	98–97	Adelaide 36ers	Perth
19:30	Scoring by quarter: 30–20, 18–28, 22–29, 28–20
ESPN	Pts: Pepper 25; Rebs: Lual-Acuil 11; Asts: Dell'Orso 6	boxscore report	Pts: Cotton 37; Rebs: Cheatham 9 Asts: Cotton 9	Arena: Perth Arena; Attendance: 10,145

25 September 2026	Brisbane Bullets	103–95	Illawarra Hawks	Brisbane
19:30	Scoring by quarter: 25–18, 25–24, 23–24, 30–29
ESPN	Pts: Mackinnon 31; Rebs: Mackinnon 12; Asts: Velička 11	boxscore report	Pts: Harvey 20; Rebs: Froling 10; Asts: Doyle 5	Arena: Brisbane Entertainment Centre; Attendance: 4,045

26 September 2026	Perth Wildcats	97–93	New Zealand Breakers	Perth
19:30	Scoring by quarter: 22–26, 25–25, 29–22, 21–20
ESPN/Nine Network	Pts: Windler 26; Rebs: Dell'Orso 11; Asts: Dell'Orso, Pepper 5	boxscore report	Pts: Jackson-Cartwright 30; Rebs: Davison 6 Asts: Jackson-Cartwright 8	Arena: Perth Arena; Attendance: 9,646

27 September 2026	Adelaide 36ers	83–69	Cairns Taipans	Adelaide
15:30	Scoring by quarter: 32–17, 20–17, 15–17, 16–18
ESPN	Pts: Cotton 25; Rebs: Rakocevic 12; Asts: Cheatham, Cotton 4	boxscore report	Pts: J.McVeigh 21; Rebs: Pinder 7 Asts: Bruce, Lewis 4	Arena: Adelaide Entertainment Centre; Attendance: 10,025

27 September 2026	Sydney Kings	121–100	Illawarra Hawks	Sydney
18:00	Scoring by quarter: 31–27, 34–18, 33–26, 23–29
ESPN/9Go!	Pts: Davis 31; Rebs: Carr 12; Asts: Davis 6	boxscore report	Pts: Froling, Martin 21; Rebs: Martin 7 Asts: Doyle 6	Arena: Sydney SuperDome; Attendance: 9,402

=== Round 3 ===
30 September 2026	New Zealand Breakers	98–75	Cairns Taipans	Auckland
19:30	Scoring by quarter: 19–18, 23–17, 30–25, 26–15
ESPN/Sky Sport	Pts: Jackson-Cartwright 27; Rebs: Mennenga 9 Asts: Jackson-Cartwright 10	boxscore report	Pts: J.McVeigh 16; Rebs: Pinder 7 Asts: Lewis, J.McVeigh 3	Arena: Spark Arena; Attendance: 5,187

30 September 2026	Sydney Kings	93–78	Brisbane Bullets	Sydney
19:30	Scoring by quarter: 23–34, 20–10, 29–14, 21–20
ESPN	Pts: Davis 24; Rebs: Davis 8 Asts: Davis 7	boxscore report	Pts: Williams 19; Rebs: Williams 8 Asts: Velička 5	Arena: Sydney SuperDome; Attendance: 8,031

1 October 2026	Tasmania JackJumpers	84–82	Melbourne United	Hobart
19:30	Scoring by quarter: 23–14, 29–21, 16–19, 16–28
ESPN	Pts: Magnay 17; Rebs: Magnay 11; Asts: Armstrong 6	boxscore report	Pts: Oduro 22; Rebs: Oduro, Waardenburg 8 Asts: Travers 6	Arena: Derwent Entertainment Centre; Attendance: 4,340

2 October 2026	Illawarra Hawks	114–92	Adelaide 36ers	Wollongong
19:30	Scoring by quarter: 35–21, 30–14, 27–32, 22–25
ESPN	Pts: Martin 28; Rebs: Froling 13; Asts: three players 7	boxscore report	Pts: Cotton 15; Rebs: Rakocevic 11; Asts: Cotton 7	Arena: Wollongong Entertainment Centre; Attendance: 4,025

2 October 2026	Perth Wildcats	92–88	S.E. Melbourne Phoenix	Perth
19:30	Scoring by quarter: 26–24, 22–22, 22–21, 22–21
ESPN	Pts: Pepper 25; Rebs: Windler 9 Asts: Doolittle 8	boxscore report	Pts: Mays 17; Rebs: Daniels 7 Asts: Sobey 8	Arena: Perth Arena; Attendance: 11,831

3 October 2026	Brisbane Bullets	99–109(OT)	Tasmania JackJumpers	Brisbane
17:30	Scoring by quarter: 23–17, 24–23, 18–34, 26–17, Overtime: 8–18
ESPN/9Go!	Pts: Harrison 24; Rebs: Harrison 12; Asts: Velička 13	boxscore report	Pts: Armstrong 29; Rebs: Bannan 11; Asts: Magnay 6	Arena: Brisbane Entertainment Centre; Attendance: 5,556

3 October 2026	Melbourne United	95–107	Cairns Taipans	Melbourne
19:30	Scoring by quarter: 14–18, 32–29, 35–25, 14–35
ESPN/Nine Network	Pts: Anthony 40; Rebs: Oduro 11; Asts: Travers 3	boxscore report	Pts: Pinder 27; Rebs: Bolden 10; Asts: four players 4	Arena: John Cain Arena; Attendance: 8,684

4 October 2026	S.E. Melbourne Phoenix	113–96	Illawarra Hawks	Melbourne
15:00	Scoring by quarter: 23–23, 36–18, 26–32, 28–23
ESPN	Pts: Sobey 24; Rebs: Daniels 8 Asts: Daniels, Sobey 6	boxscore report	Pts: Martin 17; Rebs: Hickey, Narkle 7 Asts: Doyle 11	Arena: John Cain Arena; Attendance: 6,623

4 October 2026	Adelaide 36ers	72–88	New Zealand Breakers	Adelaide
16:30	Scoring by quarter: 19–23, 23–25, 15–12, 15–28
ESPN	Pts: Rakocevic 29; Rebs: Rakocevic 16; Asts: Cotton 6	boxscore report	Pts: Jackson-Cartwright 27; Rebs: Jackson-Cartwright 9 Asts: Jackson-Cartwright 10	Arena: Adelaide Entertainment Centre; Attendance: 10,044

=== Round 4 ===
7 October 2026	Adelaide 36ers	91–96	Melbourne United	Adelaide
19:00	Scoring by quarter: 21–31, 17–25, 21–20, 32–20
ESPN	Pts: Cotton, Rakocevic 33; Rebs: Rakocevic 14; Asts: Cotton 10	boxscore report	Pts: Anthony 24; Rebs: Travers 7 Asts: Ili 6	Arena: Adelaide Entertainment Centre; Attendance: 10,047

8 October 2026	Cairns Taipans	97–91	Brisbane Bullets	Cairns
18:30	Scoring by quarter: 23–17, 24–33, 27–22, 23–19
ESPN	Pts: Brown 25; Rebs: Pinder 9 Asts: J.McVeigh 7	boxscore report	Pts: Hinton 30; Rebs: Harrison 18; Asts: Velička 8	Arena: Cairns Convention Centre; Attendance: 4,254

9 October 2026	Illawarra Hawks	112–122	Tasmania JackJumpers	Wollongong
19:30	Scoring by quarter: 22–32, 25–35, 26–24, 39–31
ESPN	Pts: Martin 23; Rebs: four players 4 Asts: Hickey 4	boxscore report	Pts: Johnson 32; Rebs: Magnay 9 Asts: Magnay 8	Arena: Wollongong Entertainment Centre; Attendance: 3,814

10 October 2026	S.E. Melbourne Phoenix	99–104	Melbourne United	Melbourne
19:30	Scoring by quarter: 30–17, 23–28, 21–29, 25–30
ESPN/Nine Network	Pts: Sobey 24; Rebs: Krebs 6 Asts: Mays 7	boxscore report	Pts: Travers 24; Rebs: Oduro 10; Asts: Anthony 7	Arena: John Cain Arena; Attendance: 9,007

10 October 2026	Perth Wildcats	100–84	New Zealand Breakers	Perth
18:30	Scoring by quarter: 21–22, 20–16, 29–28, 30–18
ESPN/Nine Network	Pts: Windler 32; Rebs: Windler 8 Asts: Doolittle 9	boxscore report	Pts: Mennenga 40; Rebs: Mennenga 18; Asts: Davison 11	Arena: Perth Arena; Attendance: 12,170

11 October 2026	Sydney Kings	78–84	Adelaide 36ers	Sydney
15:00	Scoring by quarter: 18–18, 26–23, 12–20, 22–23
ESPN	Pts: Cooks 22; Rebs: Craig, Cooks 8 Asts: Davis 7	boxscore report	Pts: Jenkins 20; Rebs: Cheatham 10; Asts: Cotton 8	Arena: Sydney SuperDome; Attendance: 13,365

11 October 2026	Illawarra Hawks	100–110	Cairns Taipans	Wollongong
17:00	Scoring by quarter: 27–28, 23–29, 27–29, 23–24
ESPN	Pts: Maker 18; Rebs: Froling 12; Asts: Doyle 5	boxscore report	Pts: J.McVeigh 32; Rebs: Bolden 8 Asts: Brown 9	Arena: Wollongong Entertainment Centre; Attendance: 3,836

=== Round 5 ===
14 October 2026	Sydney Kings	101–102	New Zealand Breakers	Canberra
19:30	Scoring by quarter: 29–31, 32–20, 12–24, 28–27
ESPN	Pts: Craig 28; Rebs: Carr 10; Asts: Davis 11	boxscore report	Pts: Mennenga 28; Rebs: Mennenga 13; Asts: Davison 14	Arena: AIS Arena; Attendance: 4,103

15 October 2026	Brisbane Bullets	115–105	S.E. Melbourne Phoenix	Brisbane
18:30	Scoring by quarter: 30–24, 26–31, 34–29, 25–21
ESPN	Pts: Mackinnon 24; Rebs: Mackinnon 8 Asts: Norton 9	boxscore report	Pts: Glover 27; Rebs: Krebs 8 Asts: Mays 6	Arena: Brisbane Entertainment Centre; Attendance: 3,598

16 October 2026	Tasmania JackJumpers	88–94	Adelaide 36ers	Hobart
19:30	Scoring by quarter: 22–14, 17–26, 23–31, 26–23
ESPN	Pts: Armstrong 20; Rebs: Bannan, Gold 7 Asts: Armstrong 10	boxscore report	Pts: Cotton 35; Rebs: Cheatham 11; Asts: Cotton 5	Arena: Derwent Entertainment Centre; Attendance: 4,340

17 October 2026	S.E. Melbourne Phoenix	115–83	Cairns Taipans	Melbourne
17:30	Scoring by quarter: 27–35, 35–19, 27–9, 26–20
ESPN/9Go!	Pts: Sobey 29; Rebs: Hunter 11; Asts: Sobey 6	boxscore report	Pts: Bolden 17; Rebs: four players 5 Asts: Bruce 5	Arena: John Cain Arena; Attendance: 5,661

17 October 2026	Sydney Kings	102–81	Perth Wildcats	Sydney
19:30	Scoring by quarter: 31–21, 21–22, 24–20, 26–18
ESPN/Nine Network	Pts: Craig 26; Rebs: Craig 12; Asts: Davis 8	boxscore report	Pts: Windler 19; Rebs: Windler 8 Asts: Windler 6	Arena: Sydney SuperDome; Attendance: 8,032

18 October 2026	Tasmania JackJumpers	98–92	New Zealand Breakers	Hobart
15:00	Scoring by quarter: 31–32, 22–19, 17–14, 28–27
ESPN	Pts: Armstrong 32; Rebs: Magnay 8 Asts: Magnay 6	boxscore report	Pts: Mennenga 36; Rebs: Mennenga 11; Asts: Davison 11	Arena: Derwent Entertainment Centre; Attendance: 4,340

18 October 2026	Melbourne United	89–91	Illawarra Hawks	Melbourne
17:00	Scoring by quarter: 27–21, 16–35, 22–22, 24–13
ESPN	Pts: Anthony 24; Rebs: three players 7 Asts: Anthony, Ingles 5	boxscore report	Pts: Maker 23; Rebs: Froling, Maker 6 Asts: Doyle 7	Arena: John Cain Arena; Attendance: 9,679

=== Round 6 ===
21 October 2026	Tasmania JackJumpers	106–85	Brisbane Bullets	Hobart
19:30	Scoring by quarter: 22–15, 34–29, 28–20, 22–21
ESPN	Pts: Bannan 22; Rebs: Bannan 9 Asts: Magnay 7	boxscore report	Pts: Mackinnon 21; Rebs: four players 4 Asts: Neto 6	Arena: Derwent Entertainment Centre; Attendance: 4,320

22 October 2026	Illawarra Hawks	82–108	Sydney Kings	Wollongong
19:30	Scoring by quarter: 19–20, 17–28, 16–34, 30–26
ESPN	Pts: Maker 24; Rebs: Maker 7 Asts: Patterson 5	boxscore report	Pts: Davis 23; Rebs: Carr 20; Asts: Davis 14	Arena: Wollongong Entertainment Centre; Attendance: 3,987

23 October 2026	Perth Wildcats	103–102	Melbourne United	Perth
18:30	Scoring by quarter: 25–26, 21–22, 31–31, 26–23
ESPN	Pts: Doolittle 23; Rebs: Doolittle 10; Asts: Doolittle 8	boxscore report	Pts: Travers 26; Rebs: Travers 9 Asts: Ingles 8	Arena: Perth Arena; Attendance: 12,808

24 October 2026	Illawarra Hawks	81–98	Brisbane Bullets	Wollongong
17:30	Scoring by quarter: 16–25, 19–30, 27–14, 19–29
ESPN/9Go!	Pts: Blanchfield 19; Rebs: Froling, Maker 6 Asts: Doyle, Harvey 4	boxscore report	Pts: Hinton 21; Rebs: Harrison 8 Asts: Hinton 6	Arena: Wollongong Entertainment Centre; Attendance: 3,948

24 October 2026	S.E. Melbourne Phoenix	108–94	Adelaide 36ers	Melbourne
19:30	Scoring by quarter: 42–25, 30–18, 14–29, 22–22
ESPN/Nine Network	Pts: Glover, Schwartz 20; Rebs: Morin 8 Asts: Sobey 6	boxscore report	Pts: Cotton 37; Rebs: Rakocevic 17; Asts: Cotton 8	Arena: John Cain Arena; Attendance: 5,602

25 October 2026	Cairns Taipans	86–84	New Zealand Breakers	Cairns
14:00	Scoring by quarter: 16–25, 23–21, 21–16, 26–22
ESPN	Pts: J.Galloway, J.McVeigh 18; Rebs: Bolden 14; Asts: J.McVeigh 7	boxscore report	Pts: Mennenga 22; Rebs: Bediako 10; Asts: Jackson-Cartwright 9	Arena: Cairns Convention Centre; Attendance: 4,414

25 October 2026	Melbourne United	105–95	Sydney Kings	Melbourne
17:00	Scoring by quarter: 32–31, 24–20, 21–13, 28–31
ESPN	Pts: Anthony 30; Rebs: Anthony, Waardenburg 6 Asts: Anthony 9	boxscore report	Pts: Craig 22; Rebs: Craig 13; Asts: Cooks 6	Arena: John Cain Arena; Attendance: 8,523

=== Round 7 ===
28 October 2026	Perth Wildcats	91–99	Sydney Kings	Perth
18:30	Scoring by quarter: 17–33, 25–26, 28–21, 21–19
ESPN	Pts: Knight 27; Rebs: Doolittle 15; Asts: Knight, Rillie 4	boxscore report	Pts: Craig 26; Rebs: Carr 8 Asts: Davis 9	Arena: Perth Arena; Attendance: 10,095

29 October 2026	Brisbane Bullets	85–107	Cairns Taipans	Brisbane
19:00	Scoring by quarter: 21–23, 21–34, 19–21, 24–29
ESPN	Pts: Murray 20; Rebs: Harrison, Hinton 6 Asts: Harrison, Neto 4	boxscore report	Pts: J.McVeigh 23; Rebs: Bolden 13; Asts: Brown 5	Arena: Brisbane Entertainment Centre; Attendance: 2,906

30 October 2026	New Zealand Breakers	101–108	Adelaide 36ers	Auckland
19:30	Scoring by quarter: 24–28, 20–28, 28–18, 29–34
ESPN/Sky Sport	Pts: Mennenga 28; Rebs: four players 5 Asts: Davison 11	boxscore report	Pts: Cotton 31; Rebs: Rakocevic 11; Asts: Cotton 6	Arena: Spark Arena; Attendance: 4,492

30 October 2026	Tasmania JackJumpers	68–71	Sydney Kings	Launceston
19:30	Scoring by quarter: 19–19, 12–18, 24–13, 13–21
ESPN	Pts: Mathias 20; Rebs: Magnay 14; Asts: Bannan 5	boxscore report	Pts: Davis 20; Rebs: Craig 7 Asts: Davis 9	Arena: Silverdome; Attendance: 3,260

31 October 2026	Cairns Taipans	97–113	Melbourne United	Cairns
18:30	Scoring by quarter: 33–26, 21–25, 19–34, 24–28
ESPN/9Go!	Pts: J.McVeigh 19; Rebs: Bolden 7 Asts: Brown, J.McVeigh 7	boxscore report	Pts: Oduro 26; Rebs: Anthony, Travers 7 Asts: three players 4	Arena: Cairns Convention Centre; Attendance: 4,028

31 October 2026	Perth Wildcats	98–105	Illawarra Hawks	Perth
18:30	Scoring by quarter: 19–24, 25–27, 25–27, 29–27
ESPN/Nine Network	Pts: Dell'Orso 21; Rebs: Windler 9 Asts: Doolittle 7	boxscore report	Pts: Martin 23; Rebs: Hickey 8 Asts: Hickey 8	Arena: Perth Arena; Attendance: 10,658

1 November 2026	S.E Melbourne Phoenix	89–98	Tasmania JackJumpers	Melbourne
15:00	Scoring by quarter: 18–27, 21–30, 25–19, 25–22
ESPN	Pts: Schwartz 27; Rebs: Schwartz, Sobey 5 Asts: Daniels 4	boxscore report	Pts: Mathias 22; Rebs: Marshall, Mathias 7 Asts: Mathias 6	Arena: John Cain Arena; Attendance: 9,501

1 November 2026	Adelaide 36ers	89–96	Brisbane Bullets	Adelaide
16:30	Scoring by quarter: 17–30, 26–20, 23–26, 23–20
ESPN	Pts: Cotton 27; Rebs: Rakocevic 8 Asts: Cheatham, Cotton 9	boxscore report	Pts: Harrison 24; Rebs: Harrison 10; Asts: Norton 7	Arena: Adelaide Entertainment Centre; Attendance: 10,039

2 November 2026	Melbourne United	94–74	New Zealand Breakers	Melbourne
19:30	Scoring by quarter: 28–19, 15–20, 27–16, 24–19
ESPN	Pts: Anthony 21; Rebs: Oduro 19; Asts: Travers 6	boxscore report	Pts: Mennenga 15; Rebs: Bediako 12; Asts: Davison 10	Arena: John Cain Arena; Attendance: 10,017

=== Round 8 ===
4 November 2026	Brisbane Bullets	109–104	Perth Wildcats	Brisbane
19:00	Scoring by quarter: 37–22, 26–21, 18–25, 28–36
ESPN	Pts: Harrison 16; Rebs: Hinton 8 Asts: Neto 8	boxscore report	Pts: Doolittle 24; Rebs: Doolittle 7 Asts: Doolittle 9	Arena: Nissan Arena; Attendance: 2,995

5 November 2026	Cairns Taipans	95–107	Illawarra Hawks	Cairns
18:30	Scoring by quarter: 35–32, 27–29, 20–26, 13–20
ESPN	Pts: Pinder 21; Rebs: Lewis, Pinder 8 Asts: J.McVeigh 7	boxscore report	Pts: Maker 24; Rebs: Maker 9 Asts: three players 3	Arena: Cairns Convention Centre; Attendance: 4,377

6 November 2026	Tasmania JackJumpers	79–77	New Zealand Breakers	Launceston
19:30	Scoring by quarter: 27–19, 16–24, 21–12, 15–22
ESPN	Pts: Mathias 18; Rebs: Bannan 11; Asts: Bannan 7	boxscore report	Pts: Mennenga 29; Rebs: Mennenga 17; Asts: Davison 9	Arena: Silverdome; Attendance: 3,260

7 November 2026	Adelaide 36ers	106–78	Illawarra Hawks	Adelaide
17:00	Scoring by quarter: 22–21, 27–16, 36–23, 21–18
ESPN/9Go!	Pts: Cotton 22; Rebs: Rakocevic 16; Asts: Cheatham 11	boxscore report	Pts: Harvey 19; Rebs: Blanchfield 8 Asts: Hickey 12	Arena: Adelaide Entertainment Centre; Attendance: 10,016

7 November 2026	Melbourne United	120–92	Brisbane Bullets	Melbourne
19:30	Scoring by quarter: 29–17, 33–31, 21–25, 37–19
ESPN/9Go!	Pts: Anthony 32; Rebs: Oduro 14; Asts: Anthony 6	boxscore report	Pts: Mayen 15; Rebs: Harrison 5 Asts: Neto 6	Arena: John Cain Arena; Attendance: 7,215

8 November 2026	Sydney Kings	110–99	S.E. Melbourne Phoenix	Sydney
15:00	Scoring by quarter: 28–38, 26–13, 29–19, 27–29
ESPN	Pts: Davis 28; Rebs: Cooks 14; Asts: Davis 9	boxscore report	Pts: Sobey 33; Rebs: Morin 12; Asts: Morin, Sobey 4	Arena: Sydney SuperDome; Attendance: 11,123

8 November 2026	Perth Wildcats	92–100	Cairns Taipans	Perth
14:00	Scoring by quarter: 27–31, 21–22, 17–24, 27–23
ESPN	Pts: Pepper 26; Rebs: Doolittle 8 Asts: Rillie 7	boxscore report	Pts: J.McVeigh 36; Rebs: Bolden, Pinder 7 Asts: Pinder 6	Arena: Perth Arena; Attendance: 12,581

=== Round 9 ===
11 November 2026	S.E. Melbourne Phoenix	110–120	Illawarra Hawks	Melbourne
19:30	Scoring by quarter: 23–28, 31–43, 27–24, 29–25
ESPN	Pts: Schwartz 22; Rebs: Krebs 11; Asts: Sobey 9	boxscore report	Pts: Martin 27; Rebs: Hickey 9 Asts: Hickey 8	Arena: State Basketball Centre; Attendance: 1,838

12 November 2026	Adelaide 36ers	101–93	Melbourne United	Adelaide
19:00	Scoring by quarter: 27–10, 32–25, 21–27, 21–31
ESPN	Pts: Jenkins 21; Rebs: Cheatham 12; Asts: Cotton 10	boxscore report	Pts: Anthony 27; Rebs: Travers 8 Asts: Ingles 7	Arena: Adelaide Entertainment Centre; Attendance: 10,046

12 November 2026	Perth Wildcats	98–92	Tasmania JackJumpers	Perth
18:30	Scoring by quarter: 19–21, 24–27, 26–16, 29–28
ESPN	Pts: Knight 23; Rebs: Windler 10; Asts: Doolittle, Knight 5	boxscore report	Pts: Armstrong 20; Rebs: Bannan, Magnay 12; Asts: Armstrong 7	Arena: Perth Arena; Attendance: 9,422

13 November 2026	New Zealand Breakers	94–90(OT)	Brisbane Bullets	Auckland
19:30	Scoring by quarter: 14–26, 26–16, 20–22, 19–17, Overtime: 15–11
ESPN/Sky Sport	Pts: Vasiljevic 36; Rebs: Davison 12; Asts: Davison 13	boxscore report	Pts: Harrison 22; Rebs: Hinton 14; Asts: Neto 10	Arena: Spark Arena; Attendance: 3,723

13 November 2026	Cairns Taipans	84–82	Sydney Kings	Cairns
18:30	Scoring by quarter: 12–29, 20–24, 31–14, 21–15
ESPN	Pts: Pinder 24; Rebs: Pinder 10; Asts: Bruce 4	boxscore report	Pts: Davis 23; Rebs: Carr 10; Asts: Davis 7	Arena: Cairns Convention Centre; Attendance: 4,016

14 November 2026	Melbourne United	102–95	S.E. Melbourne Phoenix	Melbourne
19:30	Scoring by quarter: 30–22, 34–17, 23–29, 15–27
ESPN/9Go!	Pts: Anthony 39; Rebs: Waardenburg 10; Asts: Ingles 5	boxscore report	Pts: Sobey 23; Rebs: Morin, Sobey 6 Asts: Sobey 8	Arena: John Cain Arena; Attendance: 10,175

14 November 2026	Perth Wildcats	111–100(OT)	Illawarra Hawks	Perth
18:30	Scoring by quarter: 26–30, 24–18, 19–18, 23–26, Overtime: 19–8
ESPN/9Go!	Pts: Doolittle 29; Rebs: Windler 11; Asts: Rillie 6	boxscore report	Pts: Maker 21; Rebs: Froling 12; Asts: Hickey 10	Arena: Perth Arena; Attendance: 11,615

15 November 2026	Sydney Kings	111–102(2OT)	New Zealand Breakers	Sydney
15:00	Scoring by quarter: 21–20, 24–25, 20–19, 22–23, Overtime: 9–9, 15–6
ESPN	Pts: Davis 36; Rebs: Craig 11; Asts: Davis 9	boxscore report	Pts: Noi 32; Rebs: Bediako 10; Asts: Davison 15	Arena: Sydney SuperDome; Attendance: 10,183

15 November 2026	Brisbane Bullets	92–104	Tasmania JackJumpers	Brisbane
16:00	Scoring by quarter: 26–21, 26–29, 14–29, 26–25
ESPN	Pts: Hinton 27; Rebs: Mayen 8 Asts: Hinton 4	boxscore report	Pts: Stattmann 28; Rebs: Bannan 12; Asts: Magnay 5	Arena: Brisbane Entertainment Centre; Attendance: 4,669

=== Round 10 ===
18 November 2026	New Zealand Breakers	96–101	S.E. Melbourne Phoenix	Auckland
19:30	Scoring by quarter: 28–21, 27–23, 19–30, 22–27
ESPN/Sky Sport	Pts: Mays 20; Rebs: Mennenga 9 Asts: Mays 8	boxscore report	Pts: Sobey 30; Rebs: Morin 10; Asts: Sobey 9	Arena: Spark Arena; Attendance: 3,917

19 November 2026	Illawarra Hawks	103–97	Adelaide 36ers	Wollongong
19:30	Scoring by quarter: 23–26, 23–23, 25–24, 32–24
ESPN	Pts: Maker 23; Rebs: Maker 13; Asts: Doyle 7	boxscore report	Pts: Cotton 28; Rebs: Rakocevic 11; Asts: Cotton 9	Arena: Wollongong Entertainment Centre; Attendance: 3,742

20 November 2026	Cairns Taipans	98–90	Perth Wildcats	Cairns
18:30	Scoring by quarter: 25–16, 26–26, 22–28, 25–20
ESPN	Pts: Brown 31; Rebs: J.McVeigh 9 Asts: Bolden 5	boxscore report	Pts: Pepper 19; Rebs: Doolittle 10; Asts: Knight 5	Arena: Cairns Convention Centre; Attendance: 4,099

21 November 2026	Tasmania JackJumpers	95–82	Illawarra Hawks	Hobart
17:30	Scoring by quarter: 20–17, 23–19, 29–20, 23–26
ESPN/9Go!	Pts: Bannan 22; Rebs: Bannan 12; Asts: Armstrong 8	boxscore report	Pts: Maker 21; Rebs: Narkle 7 Asts: Harvey 7	Arena: Derwent Entertainment Centre; Attendance: 4,340

21 November 2026	Melbourne United	94–91	New Zealand Breakers	Melbourne
19:30	Scoring by quarter: 24–20, 26–24, 24–22, 20–25
ESPN/9Go!	Pts: Oduro 24; Rebs: Oduro 14; Asts: Ingles 7	boxscore report	Pts: Mays 27; Rebs: Mennenga 9 Asts: Davison 10	Arena: John Cain Arena; Attendance: 7,588

22 November 2026	S.E. Melbourne Phoenix	92–95	Cairns Taipans	Melbourne
15:00	Scoring by quarter: 24–31, 26–28, 21–16, 21–20
ESPN	Pts: Krebs 28; Rebs: Daniels 8 Asts: Sobey 11	boxscore report	Pts: J.McVeigh 24; Rebs: Pinder 8 Asts: Bruce 5	Arena: John Cain Arena; Attendance: 6,836

22 November 2026	Brisbane Bullets	115–104	Sydney Kings	Brisbane
16:00	Scoring by quarter: 30–26, 24–26, 33–23, 28–29
ESPN	Pts: Mackinnon 23; Rebs: Harrison 13; Asts: Velicka 7	boxscore report	Pts: Johnston 23; Rebs: Cooks 7 Asts: Cooks, Johnston 4	Arena: Brisbane Entertainment Centre; Attendance: 5,381

=== Round 11 ===
2 December 2026	Adelaide 36ers	vs.	S.E. Melbourne Phoenix	Adelaide
19:00	Scoring by quarter: –, –, –, –
ESPN				Arena: Adelaide Entertainment Centre

3 December 2026	Brisbane Bullets	vs.	Perth Wildcats	Brisbane
19:00	Scoring by quarter: –, –, –, –
ESPN				Arena: Brisbane Entertainment Centre

4 December 2026	New Zealand Breakers	vs.	Melbourne United	Auckland
19:30	Scoring by quarter: –, –, –, –
ESPN/Sky Sport				Arena: Spark Arena

4 December 2026	Illawarra Hawks	vs.	Sydney Kings	Wollongong
19:30	Scoring by quarter: –, –, –, –
ESPN				Arena: Wollongong Entertainment Centre

5 December 2026	Cairns Taipans	vs.	S.E. Melbourne Phoenix	Cairns
16:30	Scoring by quarter: –, –, –, –
ESPN/9Go!				Arena: Cairns Convention Centre

5 December 2026	Adelaide 36ers	vs.	Tasmania JackJumpers	Adelaide
19:00	Scoring by quarter: –, –, –, –
ESPN/Nine Network				Arena: Adelaide Entertainment Centre

6 December 2026	Melbourne United	vs.	Brisbane Bullets	Melbourne
15:00	Scoring by quarter: –, –, –, –
ESPN				Arena: John Cain Arena

6 December 2026	Sydney Kings	vs.	Perth Wildcats	Sydney
17:00	Scoring by quarter: –, –, –, –
ESPN				Arena: Sydney SuperDome

=== Round 12 ===
9 December 2026	Cairns Taipans	vs.	Adelaide 36ers	Cairns
18:30	Scoring by quarter: –, –, –, –
ESPN				Arena: TBC

10 December 2026	Illawarra Hawks	vs.	Tasmania JackJumpers	Wollongong
19:30	Scoring by quarter: –, –, –, –
ESPN				Arena: Wollongong Entertainment Centre

11 December 2026	New Zealand Breakers	vs.	Sydney Kings	Auckland
19:30	Scoring by quarter: –, –, –, –
ESPN/Sky Sport				Arena: Spark Arena

12 December 2026	Cairns Taipans	vs.	Brisbane Bullets	Cairns
16:30	Scoring by quarter: –, –, –, –
ESPN/9Go!				Arena: Cairns Convention Centre

12 December 2026	Melbourne United	vs.	Tasmania JackJumpers	Melbourne
19:30	Scoring by quarter: –, –, –, –
ESPN/9Go!				Arena: John Cain Arena

13 December 2026	Adelaide 36ers	vs.	Sydney Kings	Adelaide
14:00	Scoring by quarter: –, –, –, –
ESPN				Arena: Adelaide Entertainment Centre

13 December 2026	S.E. Melbourne Phoenix	vs.	Perth Wildcats	Traralgon
17:00	Scoring by quarter: –, –, –, –
ESPN				Arena: Gippsland Indoor Stadium

=== Round 13 ===
16 December 2026	Perth Wildcats	vs.	Melbourne United	Perth
18:30	Scoring by quarter: –, –, –, –
ESPN				Arena: Perth Arena

17 December 2026	Sydney Kings	vs.	Cairns Taipans	Canberra
19:30	Scoring by quarter: –, –, –, –
ESPN				Arena: AIS Arena

18 December 2026	New Zealand Breakers	vs.	Tasmania JackJumpers	Hamilton
19:30	Scoring by quarter: –, –, –, –
ESPN/Sky Sport				Arena: Claudelands Arena

19 December 2026	Adelaide 36ers	vs.	Brisbane Bullets	Adelaide
17:00	Scoring by quarter: –, –, –, –
ESPN/9Go!				Arena: Adelaide Entertainment Centre

19 December 2026	S.E. Melbourne Phoenix	vs.	Sydney Kings	Melbourne
20:00	Scoring by quarter: –, –, –, –
ESPN/Nine Network				Arena: John Cain Arena

20 December 2026	Illawarra Hawks	vs.	Melbourne United	Wollongong
15:00	Scoring by quarter: –, –, –, –
ESPN				Arena: Wollongong Entertainment Centre

20 December 2026	Cairns Taipans	vs.	Perth Wildcats	Cairns
16:00	Scoring by quarter: –, –, –, –
ESPN				Arena: Cairns Convention Centre

21 December 2026	Tasmania JackJumpers	vs.	Adelaide 36ers	Hobart
19:30	Scoring by quarter: –, –, –, –
ESPN				Arena: Derwent Entertainment Centre

22 December 2026	New Zealand Breakers	vs.	Brisbane Bullets	Auckland
19:30	Scoring by quarter: –, –, –, –
ESPN/Sky Sport				Arena: Spark Arena

=== Round 14 ===
23 December 2026	Melbourne United	vs.	Cairns Taipans	Melbourne
20:00	Scoring by quarter: –, –, –, –
ESPN				Arena: John Cain Arena

24 December 2026	Adelaide 36ers	vs.	Perth Wildcats	Adelaide
18:30	Scoring by quarter: –, –, –, –
ESPN				Arena: Adelaide Entertainment Centre

25 December 2026	Sydney Kings	vs.	Illawarra Hawks	Sydney
19:30	Scoring by quarter: –, –, –, –
ESPN/Nine Network				Arena: Sydney SuperDome

26 December 2026	Tasmania JackJumpers	vs.	S.E. Melbourne Phoenix	Hobart
19:30	Scoring by quarter: –, –, –, –
ESPN/9Go!				Arena: Derwent Entertainment Centre

27 December 2026	Illawarra Hawks	vs.	New Zealand Breakers	Wollongong
15:00	Scoring by quarter: –, –, –, –
ESPN				Arena: Wollongong Entertainment Centre

27 December 2026	Brisbane Bullets	vs.	Cairns Taipans	Adelaide
16:00	Scoring by quarter: –, –, –, –
ESPN				Arena: Adelaide Entertainment Centre

29 December 2026	Sydney Kings	vs.	Melbourne United	Sydney
19:30	Scoring by quarter: –, –, –, –
ESPN				Arena: Sydney SuperDome

=== Round 15 ===
30 December 2026	Brisbane Bullets	vs.	Adelaide 36ers	Brisbane
18:30	Scoring by quarter: –, –, –, –
ESPN				Arena: Brisbane Entertainment Centre

31 December 2026	Illawarra Hawks	vs.	S.E. Melbourne Phoenix	Wollongong
17:30	Scoring by quarter: –, –, –, –
ESPN				Arena: Wollongong Entertainment Centre

31 December 2026	Cairns Taipans	vs.	New Zealand Breakers	Cairns
19:30	Scoring by quarter: –, –, –, –
ESPN				Arena: Cairns Convention Centre

1 January 2027	Tasmania JackJumpers	vs.	Perth Wildcats	Hobart
19:30	Scoring by quarter: –, –, –, –
ESPN				Arena: Derwent Entertainment Centre

2 January 2027	Illawarra Hawks	vs.	Cairns Taipans	Wollongong
17:30	Scoring by quarter: –, –, –, –
ESPN/9Go!				Arena: Wollongong Entertainment Centre

2 January 2027	Adelaide 36ers	vs.	S.E. Melbourne Phoenix	Adelaide
19:00	Scoring by quarter: –, –, –, –
ESPN/Nine Network				Arena: Adelaide Entertainment Centre

3 January 2027	New Zealand Breakers	vs.	Perth Wildcats	Auckland
13:00	Scoring by quarter: –, –, –, –
ESPN/Sky Sport				Arena: Spark Arena

3 January 2027	Brisbane Bullets	vs.	Melbourne United	Brisbane
16:00	Scoring by quarter: –, –, –, –
ESPN				Arena: Brisbane Entertainment Centre

4 January 2027	Sydney Kings	vs.	Tasmania JackJumpers	Sydney
19:30	Scoring by quarter: –, –, –, –
ESPN				Arena: Sydney SuperDome

=== Round 16 ===
6 January 2026	S.E. Melbourne Phoenix	vs.	Tasmania JackJumpers	Melbourne
17:30	Scoring by quarter: –, –, –, –
ESPN				Arena: State Basketball Centre

6 January 2027	Illawarra Hawks	vs.	Perth Wildcats	Wollongong
19:30	Scoring by quarter: –, –, –, –
ESPN				Arena: Wollongong Entertainment Centre

7 January 2027	Melbourne United	vs.	Adelaide 36ers	Bendigo
19:30	Scoring by quarter: –, –, –, –
ESPN/9Go!				Arena: Bendigo Stadium

8 January 2027	New Zealand Breakers	vs.	Illawarra Hawks	Auckland
19:30	Scoring by quarter: –, –, –, –
ESPN/Sky Sport				Arena: Spark Arena

8 January 2027	Brisbane Bullets	vs.	Sydney Kings	Brisbane
18:30	Scoring by quarter: –, –, –, –
ESPN				Arena: Brisbane Entertainment Centre

9 January 2027	Cairns Taipans	vs.	Tasmania JackJumpers	Cairns
16:30	Scoring by quarter: –, –, –, –
ESPN/Nine Network				Arena: Cairns Convention Centre

9 January 2027	Adelaide 36ers	vs.	Perth Wildcats	Adelaide
19:00	Scoring by quarter: –, –, –, –
ESPN/Nine Network				Arena: Adelaide Entertainment Centre

10 January 2027	S.E. Melbourne Phoenix	vs.	New Zealand Breakers	Melbourne
15:00	Scoring by quarter: –, –, –, –
ESPN				Arena: State Basketball Centre

10 January 2027	Sydney Kings	vs.	Melbourne United	Sydney
17:00	Scoring by quarter: –, –, –, –
ESPN				Arena: Sydney SuperDome

=== Round 17 ===
13 January 2027	Melbourne United	vs.	Cairns Taipans	Perth
18:30	Scoring by quarter: –, –, –, –
ESPN				Arena: Perth Arena

14 January 2027	Sydney Kings	vs.	S.E. Melbourne Phoenix	Perth
18:30	Scoring by quarter: –, –, –, –
ESPN/9Go!				Arena: Perth Arena

15 January 2027	Perth Wildcats	vs.	New Zealand Breakers	Perth
18:30	Scoring by quarter: –, –, –, –
ESPN				Arena: Perth Arena

16 January 2027	Tasmania JackJumpers	vs.	Adelaide 36ers	Perth
18:30	Scoring by quarter: –, –, –, –
ESPN/Nine Network				Arena: Perth Arena

17 January 2027	Brisbane Bullets	vs.	Illawarra Hawks	Perth
14:00	Scoring by quarter: –, –, –, –
ESPN				Arena: Perth Arena

=== Round 18 ===
20 January 2027	Melbourne United	vs.	Tasmania JackJumpers	Bendigo
17:30	Scoring by quarter: –, –, –, –
ESPN				Arena: Bendigo Stadium

20 Janaury 2027	Illawarra Hawks	vs.	New Zealand Breakers	Wollongong
19:30	Scoring by quarter: –, –, –, –
ESPN				Arena: Wollongong Entertainment Centre

21 January 2027	S.E. Melbourne Phoenix	vs.	Adelaide 36ers	Melbourne
19:30	Scoring by quarter: –, –, –, –
ESPN				Arena: State Basketball Centre

22 January 2027	Tasmania JackJumpers	vs.	Cairns Taipans	Hobart
19:30	Scoring by quarter: –, –, –, –
ESPN				Arena: Derwent Entertainment Centre

22 January 2027	Perth Wildcats	vs.	Sydney Kings	Perth
18:30	Scoring by quarter: –, –, –, –
ESPN				Arena: Perth Arena

23 Janaury 2027	Adelaide 36ers	vs.	Illawarra Hawks	Adelaide
17:00	Scoring by quarter: –, –, –, –
ESPN/Nine Network				Arena: Adelaide Entertainment Centre

23 January 2027	Brisbane Bullets	vs.	Melbourne United	Brisbane
18:30	Scoring by quarter: –, –, –, –
ESPN/Nine Network				Arena: Brisbane Entertainment Centre

24 January 2027	New Zealand Breakers	vs.	Cairns Taipans	Auckland
13:00	Scoring by quarter: –, –, –, –
ESPN/Sky Sport				Arena: Spark Arena

24 January 2027	S.E. Melbourne Phoenix	vs.	Perth Wildcats	Melbourne
17:00	Scoring by quarter: –, –, –, –
ESPN				Arena: State Basketball Centre

25 January 2027	Sydney Kings	vs.	Brisbane Bullets	Sydney
19:30	Scoring by quarter: –, –, –, –
ESPN				Arena: Sydney SuperDome

=== Round 19 ===
27 January 2027	Tasmania JackJumpers	vs.	Illawarra Hawks	Hobart
17:30	Scoring by quarter: –, –, –, –
ESPN				Arena: Derwent Entertainment Centre

27 January 2027	Cairns Taipans	vs.	Sydney Kings	Cairns
18:30	Scoring by quarter: –, –, –, –
ESPN				Arena: TBC

28 January 2027	Brisbane Bullets	vs.	S.E. Melbourne Phoenix	Brisbane
18:30	Scoring by quarter: –, –, –, –
ESPN				Arena: Brisbane Entertainment Centre

28 January 2027	Perth Wildcats	vs.	Adelaide 36ers	Perth
18:30	Scoring by quarter: –, –, –, –
ESPN				Arena: Perth Arena

29 January 2027	New Zealand Breakers	vs.	Melbourne United	Auckland
19:30	Scoring by quarter: –, –, –, –
ESPN/Sky Sport				Arena: Spark Arena

30 January 2027	Illawarra Hawks	vs.	Perth Wildcats	Wollongong
17:30	Scoring by quarter: –, –, –, –
ESPN/9Go!				Arena: Wollongong Entertainment Centre

30 January 2027	Adelaide 36ers	vs.	Sydney Kings	Adelaide
19:00	Scoring by quarter: –, –, –, –
ESPN/9Go!				Arena: Adelaide Entertainment Centre

31 January 2027	Cairns Taipans	vs.	S.E. Melbourne Phoenix	Cairns
16:00	Scoring by quarter: –, –, –, –
ESPN				Arena: Cairns Convention Centre

31 January 2027	Tasmania JackJumpers	vs.	Brisbane Bullets	Hobart
19:30	Scoring by quarter: –, –, –, –
ESPN				Arena: Derwent Entertainment Centre

=== Round 20 ===
4 February 2027	New Zealand Breakers	vs.	S.E. Melbourne Phoenix	Hamilton
19:30	Scoring by quarter: –, –, –, –
ESPN/Sky Sport				Arena: Claudelands Arena

4 February 2027	Illawarra Hawks	vs.	Brisbane Bullets	Wollongong
19:30	Scoring by quarter: –, –, –, –
ESPN				Arena: Wollongong Entertainment Centre

5 February 2027	Tasmania JackJumpers	vs.	Melbourne United	Hobart
19:30	Scoring by quarter: –, –, –, –
ESPN				Arena: Derwent Entertainment Centre

5 February 2027	Perth Wildcats	vs.	Cairns Taipans	Perth
18:30	Scoring by quarter: –, –, –, –
ESPN				Arena: Perth Arena

6 February 2027	Bullets Bullets	vs.	Adelaide 36ers	Brisbane
16:30	Scoring by quarter: –, –, –, –
ESPN/9Go!				Arena: Brisbane Entertainment Centre

6 February 2027	S.E. Melbourne Phoenix	vs.	Sydney Kings	Melbourne
19:30	Scoring by quarter: –, –, –, –
ESPN/Nine Network				Arena: John Cain Arena

7 February 2027	New Zealand Breakers	vs.	Tasmania JackJumpers	Auckland
13:00	Scoring by quarter: –, –, –, –
ESPN/Sky Sport				Arena: Spark Arena

7 February 2027	Melbourne United	vs.	Perth Wildcats	Melbourne
17:00	Scoring by quarter: –, –, –, –
ESPN				Arena: John Cain Arena

=== Round 21 ===
10 February 2027	Tasmania JackJumpers	vs.	Perth Wildcats	Hobart
19:30	Scoring by quarter: –, –, –, –
ESPN				Arena: Derwent Entertainment Centre

11 February 2027	New Zealand Breakers	vs.	Sydney Kings	Auckland
19:30	Scoring by quarter: –, –, –, –
ESPN/Sky Sport				Arena: Spark Arena

11 February 2027	Melbourne United	vs.	S.E. Melbourne Phoenix	Melbourne
19:30	Scoring by quarter: –, –, –, –
ESPN				Arena: John Cain Arena

12 February 2027	Cairns Taipans	vs.	Adelaide 36ers	Cairns
18:30	Scoring by quarter: –, –, –, –
ESPN				Arena: Cairns Convention Centre

12 February 2027	Perth Wildcats	vs.	Brisbane Bullets	Perth
18:30	Scoring by quarter: –, –, –, –
ESPN				Arena: Perth Arena

13 February 2027	Melbourne United	vs.	Illawarra Hawks	Melbourne
17:30	Scoring by quarter: –, –, –, –
ESPN/9Go!				Arena: John Cain Arena

13 February 2027	Sydney Kings	vs.	Tasmania JackJumpers	Sydney
19:30	Scoring by quarter: –, –, –, –
ESPN/Nine Network				Arena: Sydney SuperDome

14 February 2027	Adelaide 36ers	vs.	New Zealand Breakers	Adelaide
14:00	Scoring by quarter: –, –, –, –
ESPN				Arena: Adelaide Entertainment Centre

14 February 2027	S.E. Melbourne Phoenix	vs.	Brisbane Bullets	Melbourne
17:00	Scoring by quarter: –, –, –, –
ESPN				Arena: John Cain Arena

== Ladder ==
Pos	2026–27 NBL season											
Pos	Team	Pld	W	L	PCT	Last 5	Streak	Home	Away	PF	PA	PP
1	Sydney Kings	13	9	4	69.23%	4–1	W1	6–2	3–2	1282	1166	109.95%
2	Tasmania JackJumpers	13	9	4	69.23%	3–2	W1	5–2	4–2	1231	1175	104.77%
3	Cairns Taipans	15	9	6	60.00	3–2	W3	5–2	4–4	1391	1433	97.07%
4	Melbourne United	14	8	6	57.14%	4–1	W1	4–3	4–3	1376	1287	106.92%
5	Adelaide 36ers	14	7	7	50.00%	3–2	L1	3–3	4–4	1305	1305	100.00%
6	Perth Wildcats	14	7	7	50.00%	2–3	L1	7–4	0–3	1334	1369	97.44%
7	Brisbane Bullets	14	6	8	42.86%	2–3	L3	4–3	2–5	1321	1389	95.10%
8	Illawarra Hawks	16	6	10	37.50%	3–2	W1	2–4	4–6	1565	1668	93.82%
9	S.E. Melbourne Phoenix	14	5	9	35.71%	1–4	W1	3–4	2–5	1374	1371	100.22%
10	New Zealand Breakers	15	5	10	33.33%	1–4	L2	3–2	2–8	1365	1381	98.84%

Updated to match(es) played on 20 November 2026. Source: NBL.com.au

=== Ladder progression ===
Leader and qualification to semifinals
Qualification to semifinals
Qualification to play-in
Last place

2026–27 NBL season
Team ╲ Round	1	2	3	4	5	6	7	8	9	10	11	12	13	14	15	16	17	18	19	20	21
Adelaide 36ers	4	3	7	7	6	9	7	5	5												
Brisbane Bullets	3	2	5	8	5	5	6	6	7												
Cairns Taipans	9	9	8	4	7	4	5	4	4												
Illawarra Hawks	8	10	10	10	10	10	10	10	9												
Melbourne United	7	5	9	6	8	7	4	3	3												
New Zealand Breakers	6	7	4	5	4	8	9	9	8												
Perth Wildcats	10	4	3	2	3	2	3	7	6												
S.E. Melbourne Phoenix	5	8	6	9	9	6	8	8	10												
Sydney Kings	1	1	1	3	2	3	1	1	1												
Tasmania JackJumpers	2	6	2	1	1	1	2	2	2												

Updated to match(es) played on 15 November 2026. Source: NBL.com.au

== NBL Ignite Cup ==
The NBL introduced a new finals format for the 2026–27 Ignite Cup, which will include four teams and semifinals games.

Pos	Team	Pld	W	L	PF	PA	PP	BP	Pts	Qualification
1	New Zealand Breakers	3	2	1	296	277	106.9	8	14	Semifinals
2	Sydney Kings	3	2	1	293	271	108.1	7	13	Semifinals
3	Tasmania JackJumpers	1	1	0	106	85	124.7	4	7	Semifinals
4	S.E. Melbourne Phoenix	2	1	1	211	216	97.7	4	7	Semifinals
5	Brisbane Bullets	3	1	2	272	303	89.8	3	6	
6	Illawarra Hawks	1	1	0	120	110	109.1	2	5	
7	Melbourne United	1	1	0	96	91	105.5	2	5	
8	Perth Wildcats	2	0	2	195	208	93.8	4	4	
9	Adelaide 36ers	1	0	1	91	96	94.8	2	2	
10	Cairns Taipans	1	0	1	75	98	76.5	0	0	

Updated to match(es) played on 18 November 2026. Source: Ignitecup.com.au

== Finals ==
The 2026 NBL Finals will be played in March 2027, consisting of three play-in games, two best-of-three semifinal series and the best-of-five NBL Championship series. In the semifinals, the higher seed hosts the first and third games. In the Championship Series, the higher seed hosts the first, third and fifth games.

The top two seeds in the regular season will automatically qualify to the semifinals. Teams ranked three to six will compete in the play-in tournament. The third seed will play the fourth seed for third spot and the loser will play the winner of fifth or sixth for the fourth spot.

== Awards ==
=== Pre-season ===
- Loggins-Bruton Cup: Melbourne United
- Most Valuable Player (Ray Borner Medal): Luke Travers (Melbourne United)

=== Regular season ===
==== Awards Night ====
- Most Valuable Player (Andrew Gaze Trophy):
- Next Generation Award:
- Best Defensive Player (Damian Martin Trophy):
- Best Sixth Man:
- Most Improved Player:
- Fans MVP:
- Coach of the Year (Lindsay Gaze Trophy):
- Executive of the Year:
- Referee of the Year:
- GameTime by Kmart:
- Three-Pointer of the Year:
- Dunk of the Year:
- All-NBL First Team:
- All-NBL Second Team:

=== Postseason ===
- Grand Final Series MVP (Larry Sengstock Medal):
- NBL Champions:
