= Jacob Chance =

Australian professional basketball coach (born 1993)

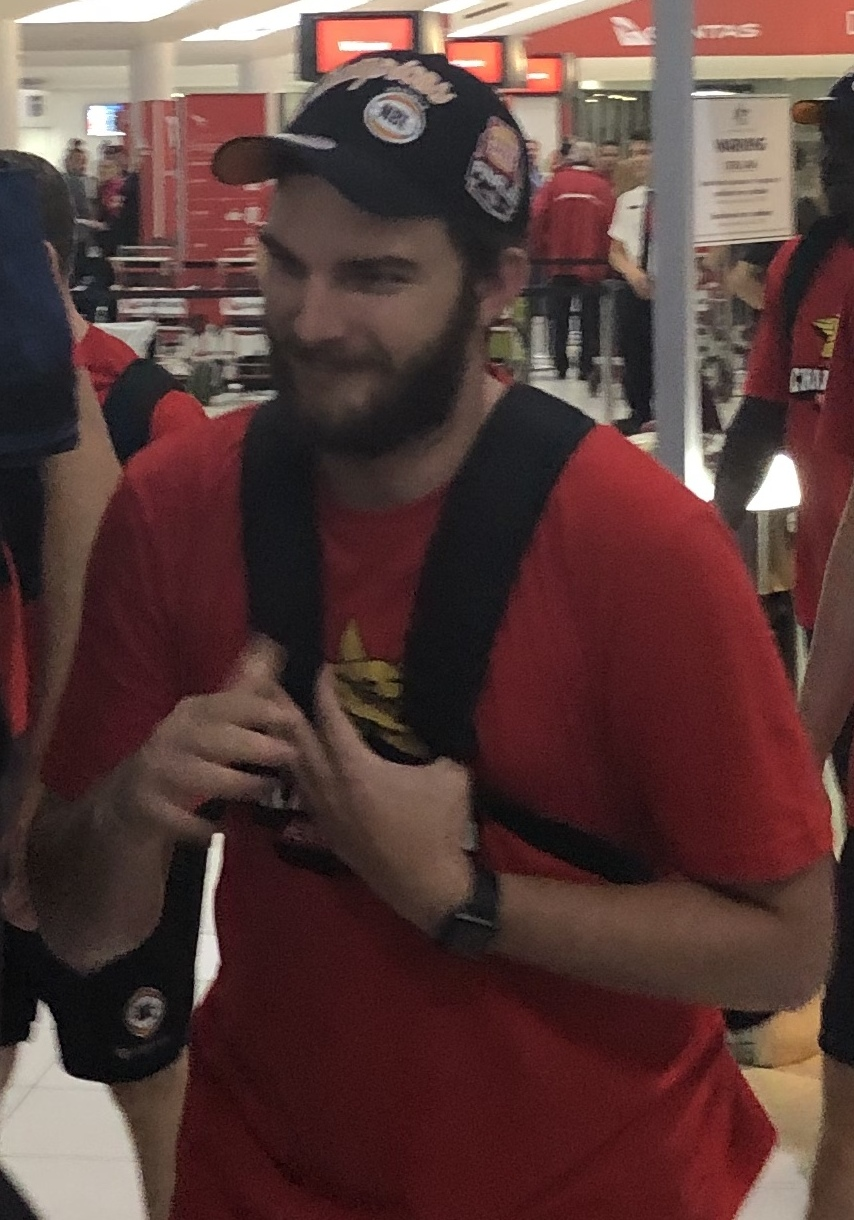
- Chance with the Perth Wildcats in 2019

Melbourne United
- Position: Head coach
- League: NBL

Personal information
- Born: 29 September 1993 (age 33)

Career information
- Coaching career: 2017–present

Career history

Coaching
- 2017–2018: Rockingham Flames (assistant)
- 2019–2021: Perth Wildcats (assistant)
- 2021: Hawke's Bay Hawks
- 2021–2023: Tasmania JackJumpers (assistant)
- 2023–2025: Melbourne United (assistant)
- 2025–2026: Austin Spurs
- 2026–present: Melbourne United

Career highlights
- As assistant coach: NBL champion (2020)

Jacob Chance (born 29 September 1993) is an Australian professional basketball coach who is the head coach of Melbourne United of the National Basketball League (NBL). He served as an assistant coach in the NBL between 2019 and 2025, first with the Perth Wildcats (2019–21) and followed by the Tasmania JackJumpers (2021–23) and Melbourne United (2023–25). After a season as head coach of the Austin Spurs in the NBA G League in 2025–26, he returned to Australia after being appointed head coach of Melbourne United in June 2026.

== Early life ==
Chance is a native of Perth, Western Australia, hailing from the suburb of Rockingham. Growing up, Chance was influenced by his mother's career in dementia care nursing, which contributed to his interest in the medical field. He graduated from the University of Notre Dame Australia in 2015, majoring in physiotherapy.

== Coaching career ==
In 2015, Chance began his basketball career with the Perth Wildcats of the National Basketball League (NBL) after accepting a volunteer opportunity with the club. He joined the Wildcats as a video intern before becoming the club's video coordinator and development coach in 2016. During his time with Perth, he was involved in the development of the Perth Wildcats Academy, a pathway program for Western Australian players aged 16 and over. He also served as an assistant coach with the Rockingham Flames of the State Basketball League (SBL) during the 2017 and 2018 seasons.

In 2019, Chance was promoted to assistant coach of the Wildcats. He played a key role in guiding Perth to the NBL championship in the 2019–20 season. Following the 2020–21 NBL season, he parted ways with the Wildcats. In six years under head coach Trevor Gleeson, Chance was part of four championships (2015–16, 2016–17, 2018–19 and 2019–20).

In February 2021, Chance was appointed head coach of the Hawke's Bay Hawks of the New Zealand National Basketball League (NZNBL) as a replacement for original coach signing, Adam Forde. Chance started the 2021 season as coach before Forde ultimately finished the season by leading the Hawks to the finals.

In July 2021, Chance joined the Tasmania JackJumpers as an assistant coach for the team's inaugural season in the NBL in 2021–22. He and head coach Scott Roth had worked together at Perth between 2019 and 2021. Chance helped the JackJumpers reach the NBL Grand Final series in their inaugural season. In July 2022, he was promoted to associate head coach for the 2022–23 NBL season. On 17 May 2023, he parted ways with the JackJumpers, opting not to take up the third year in his contract.

On 19 May 2023, Chance was appointed assistant coach of Melbourne United on a two-year deal. Under head coach Dean Vickerman, he helped United reach back-to-back NBL Championship Series in 2023–24 and 2024–25, finishing as runners-up both times following Game 5 defeats.

On 19 August 2025, Chance was appointed head coach of the Austin Spurs of the NBA G League for the 2025–26 season. He was named G League Coach of the Month for November after leading the Spurs to a 9–1 record to start the season, Austin's best start in franchise history. The team finished fifth in the Western Conference with a 23–13 record before being eliminated from the playoffs by the fourth-seeded Rio Grande Valley Vipers. Following the G League season, he received an opportunity to spend time on the San Antonio Spurs bench during the 2026 NBA Finals against the New York Knicks.

On 29 June 2026, Chance signed a four-year contract to return to Melbourne United as head coach and head of basketball operations. At age 32, he will be the youngest head coach in the 2026–27 NBL season and the youngest head coach in the league since Shawn Dennis (31) in 1997.

=== National team ===
In 2022, Chance joined the Australia men's national basketball team as head of video and analytics. He was part of the Boomers coaching staff for the 2023 FIBA Basketball World Cup and the 2024 Paris Olympics. On 31 October 2024, he was promoted from head of video and analytics to interim head coach of the Boomers for the 2025 FIBA Asia Cup qualifiers. In February 2025, he was re-appointed head coach for another qualifiers window. He led the Boomers to an undefeated record with wins over Thailand, South Korea, and Indonesia.

In August 2026, Chance resumed Boomers head coach duties for a new window of the FIBA Basketball World Cup 2027 Asian Qualifiers.
