= D'Shawn Schwartz =

American basketball player (born 1999)

- Schwartz with the Rostock Seawolves in 2024

No. 99 – South East Melbourne Phoenix
- Position: Small forward / shooting guard
- League: NBL

Personal information
- Born: February 15, 1999 (age 27) Abilene, Texas, U.S.
- Listed height: 6 ft 7 in (2.01 m)
- Listed weight: 232 lb (105 kg)

Career information
- High school: Sand Creek (Colorado Springs, Colorado)
- College: Colorado (2017–2021); George Mason (2021–2022)
- NBA draft: 2022: undrafted
- Playing career: 2022–present

Career history
- 2022–2023: Fenerbahçe Koleji
- 2023–2024: Le Mans Sarthe Basket
- 2024–2026: Rostock Seawolves
- 2026–present: South East Melbourne Phoenix

D'Shawn Michyel Schwartz (born February 15, 1999) is an American professional basketball player for the South East Melbourne Phoenix of the Australian National Basketball League (NBL). He played college basketball for the Colorado Buffaloes and George Mason Patriots.

== Early life ==
Schwartz was born in Abilene, Texas. He attended Sand Creek High School in Colorado Springs, Colorado, where he played basketball and tennis.

As a junior with the basketball team in 2015–16, Schwartz averaged 19.9 points and 8.5 rebounds while shooting 41 percent (39-for-95) from 3-point range.

In September 2016, Schwartz committed to the University of Colorado Boulder. He was ranked as the No. 81 prospect in the nation and the No. 17 small forward by Scout.

As a senior in 2016–17, Schwartz averaged 25.7 points and 9.8 rebounds, helping the Scorpions to 19–6 record and a spot in the Sweet 16 of the Class 4A Tournament. He earned Class 4A All-State honors, was named a McDonald's All-America nominee, and received All-Colorado recognition from the Denver Post and All-USA Colorado honors. In the first game of his senior year, he scored 50 points against Thornton, setting a Sand Creek record for points scored in a game. He also holds school records for total single-season points (617), career points (1,693), career 3-pointers (327) and career rebounds (723).

== College career ==
As a freshman with the Colorado Buffaloes in 2017–18, Schwartz averaged 3.4 points and 1.8 rebounds in 13 minutes per game. He was one of just five Buffaloes to play in all 32 games and logged four starts. He scored a season-high 10 points twice.

As a sophomore in 2018–19, Schwartz averaged 9.2 points and 3.7 rebounds while starting 35 games. He had 18 double-figure scoring games, leading the Buffaloes in scoring three times. He scored a career-high 22 points against Washington on January 12, 2019. For the conference season, he was named Pac-12 All-Academic Second Team.

As a junior in 2019–20, Schwartz averaged 9.8 points, 3.6 rebounds and 1.4 assists, starting in 31 of 32 contests while leading Colorado in 3-point field goals made (51) and attempted (139). He scored in double-digits 18 times and led the Buffaloes in scoring in five games. He had a season-high 20 points twice.

As a senior in 2020–21, Schwartz averaged 9.3 points, 4.1 rebounds and 1.3 assists over 30 games with 29 starts. He led the Buffaloes in 3-point percentage (46 of 115), with his .400 mark from beyond the 3-point arc ranking the seventh best single-season performance in team history with a minimum 100 attempts. He scored in double-figures 13 times and had a season-high 18 points twice, finishing his four-year career as the 37th Buffalo to reach the 1,000-point plateau.

After graduating from Colorado, Schwartz opted to continue his career as a graduate transfer at George Mason University with the extra year of eligibility granted to all NCAA student-athletes in 2020–21 due to the COVID-19 pandemic.

In the 2021–22 season with the George Mason Patriots, Schwartz averaged 15.5 points and 4.6 rebounds per game, including 16.8 points per game in A-10 play. He tallied nine 20+ point efforts, including a season-high 29 points against South Dakota State on November 24, 2021. His 76 3-pointers made on the year ranked seventh-most in Mason single season history. He was named to the A-10 All-Academic Team. Following the season, he competed in the NABC Reese's All-Star Game.

== Professional career ==
After going undrafted in the 2022 NBA draft, Schwartz joined the New York Knicks for the 2022 NBA Summer League. He appeared in one Summer League game for the Knicks.

On July 30, 2022, Schwartz signed with Fenerbahçe Koleji of the Turkish Basketball First League (TBL). In 29 games in 2022–23, he averaged 17.8 points, 6.6 rebounds and 2.0 assists per game.

On June 14, 2023, Schwartz signed with Le Mans Sarthe Basket of the French LNB Élite. In 34 league games in 2023–24, he averaged 7.8 points and 3.0 rebounds per game. He also averaged 10.1 points, 3.9 rebounds and 1.0 assists in eight BCL games.

On July 30, 2024, Schwartz signed with the Rostock Seawolves of the German Basketball Bundesliga. In mid-February 2025, he suffered a season-ending pectoral muscle injury. In 19 games in 2024–25, he averaged 13.9 points, 4.7 rebounds and 1.1 assists per game.

On June 26, 2025, Schwartz re-signed with the Seawolves for the 2025–26 season. In a May 2026 game against Rasta Vechta, he recorded 39 points and 14 rebounds and made 7-of-10 3-pointers in a 12-point win. In 35 league games, he averaged 14.0 points, 6.0 rebounds and 1.3 assists per game. He also averaged 12.8 points, 5.8 rebounds and 1.5 assists in 12 FIBA Europe Cup games.

On July 21, 2026, Schwartz signed with the South East Melbourne Phoenix of the Australian National Basketball League (NBL) for the 2026–27 season.
