= Josh Oduro =

American basketball player (born 2000)

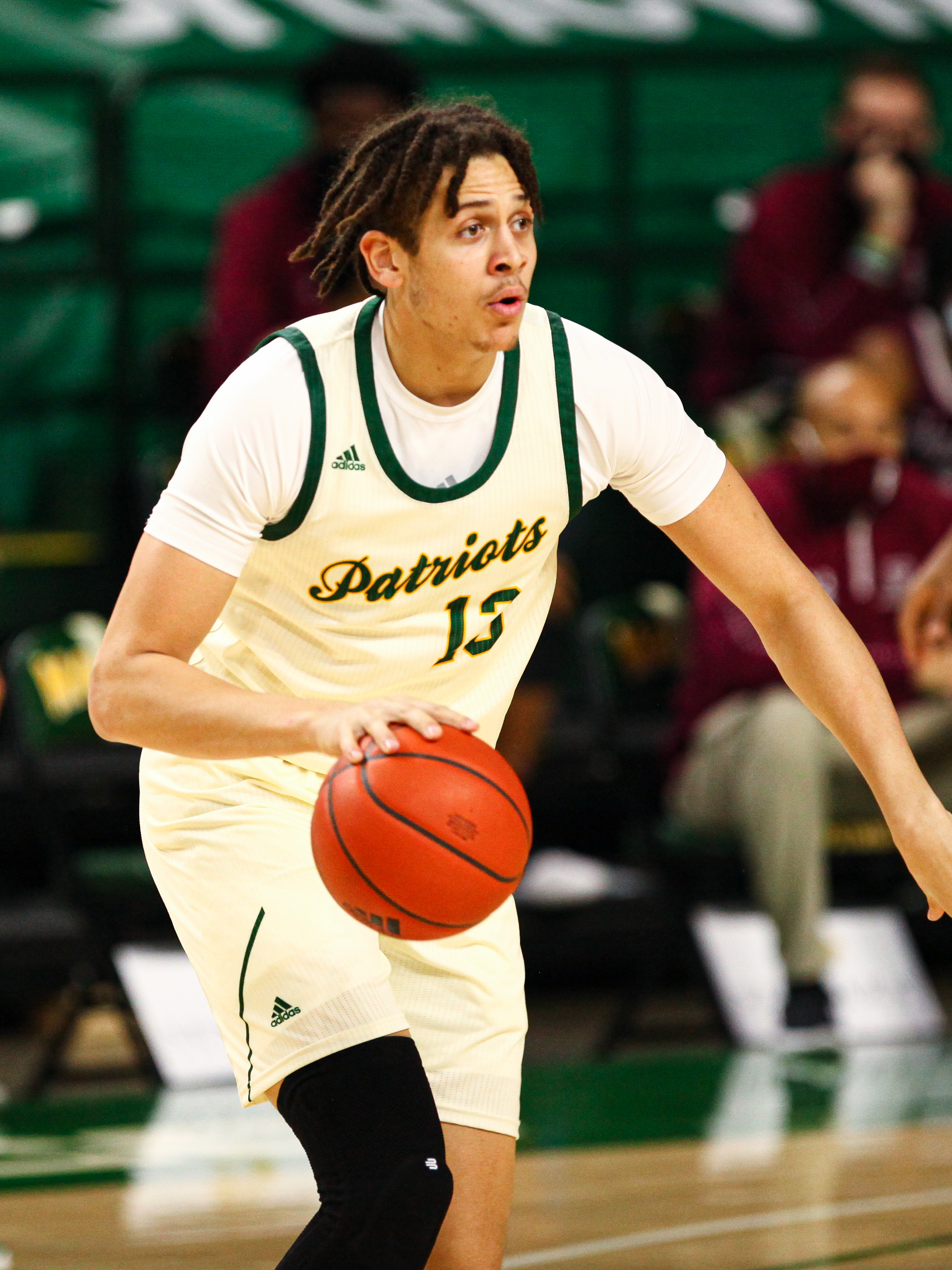
- Oduro with George Mason in 2021

No. 2 – Melbourne United
- Position: Power forward / center
- League: NBL

Personal information
- Born: October 14, 2000 (age 26) Gainesville, Virginia, U.S.
- Listed height: 6 ft 9 in (2.06 m)
- Listed weight: 240 lb (109 kg)

Career information
- High school: Battlefield (Haymarket, Virginia); Paul VI (Chantilly, Virginia)
- College: George Mason (2019–2023); Providence (2023–2024)
- NBA draft: 2024: undrafted
- Playing career: 2024–present

Career history
- 2024–2026: Birmingham Squadron
- 2026: New Orleans Pelicans
- 2026: →Birmingham Squadron
- 2026–present: Melbourne United

Career highlights
- 2× First-team All-Atlantic 10 (2022, 2023)
- Stats at NBA.com
- Stats at Basketball Reference

Joshua Kwame Awuah Oduro (born October 14, 2000) is an American professional basketball player for Melbourne United of the Australian National Basketball League (NBL). He played college basketball for the George Mason Patriots and the Providence Friars.

== High school career ==
Oduro began attending Battlefield in Haymarket, Virginia where he played two seasons and later transferred to Paul VI in Chantilly, Virginia where he led the Panthers to a 33–4 record, a VISAA Division I state title and a No. 14 national ranking in USA Today's Top-25 poll. He was named Second Team All-Conference.

== College career ==
Oduro played four years at George Mason and then transferred to Providence in his last year. With the Friars, he ranked in 10th place in the Big East in scoring (15.9), seventh in blocks (1.3), fifth in field goal percentage (.527), seventh in free-throw percentage (.819), fifth in defensive rebounds (5.2), sixth in rebounding (7.5) and ninth in offensive rebounds (2.3). He also registered five double-doubles and nine games with 20 or more points, including a season-high 32-point effort against Creighton.

In five seasons, Oduro scored 1,913 points, averaging 12.9; grabbed 976 rebounds, averaging 6.6 and shot 52.7 percent from the field.

== Professional career ==
=== Birmingham Squadron (2024–2026) ===
After going undrafted in the 2024 NBA draft, Oduro joined the New Orleans Pelicans for the 2024 NBA Summer League and on October 11, 2024, he signed with the team. However, Oduro was waived five days later and on October 28, he joined the Birmingham Squadron.

=== New Orleans Pelicans (2026) ===
On March 4, 2026, Oduro signed a two-way contract with the Pelicans. He made three appearances (including one start) for New Orleans, averaging 8.3 points, 7.7 rebounds, and 1.3 assists.

=== Melbourne United (2026–present) ===
On July 28, 2026, Oduro signed with Melbourne United of the Australian National Basketball League (NBL) for the 2026–27 season.

== Personal life ==
Oduro was born to Kofi and Kris Oduro. His father ran track and played soccer in his native Ghana.

Oduro and his wife, Caroline, had their first child in 2024.

== Career statistics ==
Legend
GP	Games played	GS	Games started	MPG	Minutes per game
FG%	Field goal percentage	3P%	3-point field goal percentage	FT%	Free throw percentage
RPG	Rebounds per game	APG	Assists per game	SPG	Steals per game
BPG	Blocks per game	PPG	Points per game	**Bold**	Career high

=== NBA ===
Year	Team	GP	GS	MPG	FG%	3P%	FT%	RPG	APG	SPG	BPG	PPG
2025–26	New Orleans	3	1	27.3	.647	.000	.500	7.7	1.3	.0	.0	8.3
Career		3	1	27.3	.647	.000	.500	7.7	1.3	.0	.0	8.3

=== College ===
Year	Team	GP	GS	MPG	FG%	3P%	FT%	RPG	APG	SPG	BPG	PPG
2019–20	George Mason	32	18	16.9	.481	.154	.609	3.9	0.3	0.3	0.8	4.9
2020–21	George Mason	22	16	23.5	.508	.200	.583	6.0	1.2	0.5	0.8	10.0
2021–22	George Mason	27	27	**31.6**	.529	**.292**	.701	7.5	1.7	**1.1**	**1.7**	**17.7**
2022–23	George Mason	33	33	29.1	**.551**	.233	.616	**7.9**	**2.6**	0.8	0.9	15.6
2023–24	Providence	**34**	**34**	30.2	.527	.291	**.819**	7.5	2.0	0.9	1.3	15.9
