= Nate Hinton =

American basketball player (born 1999)

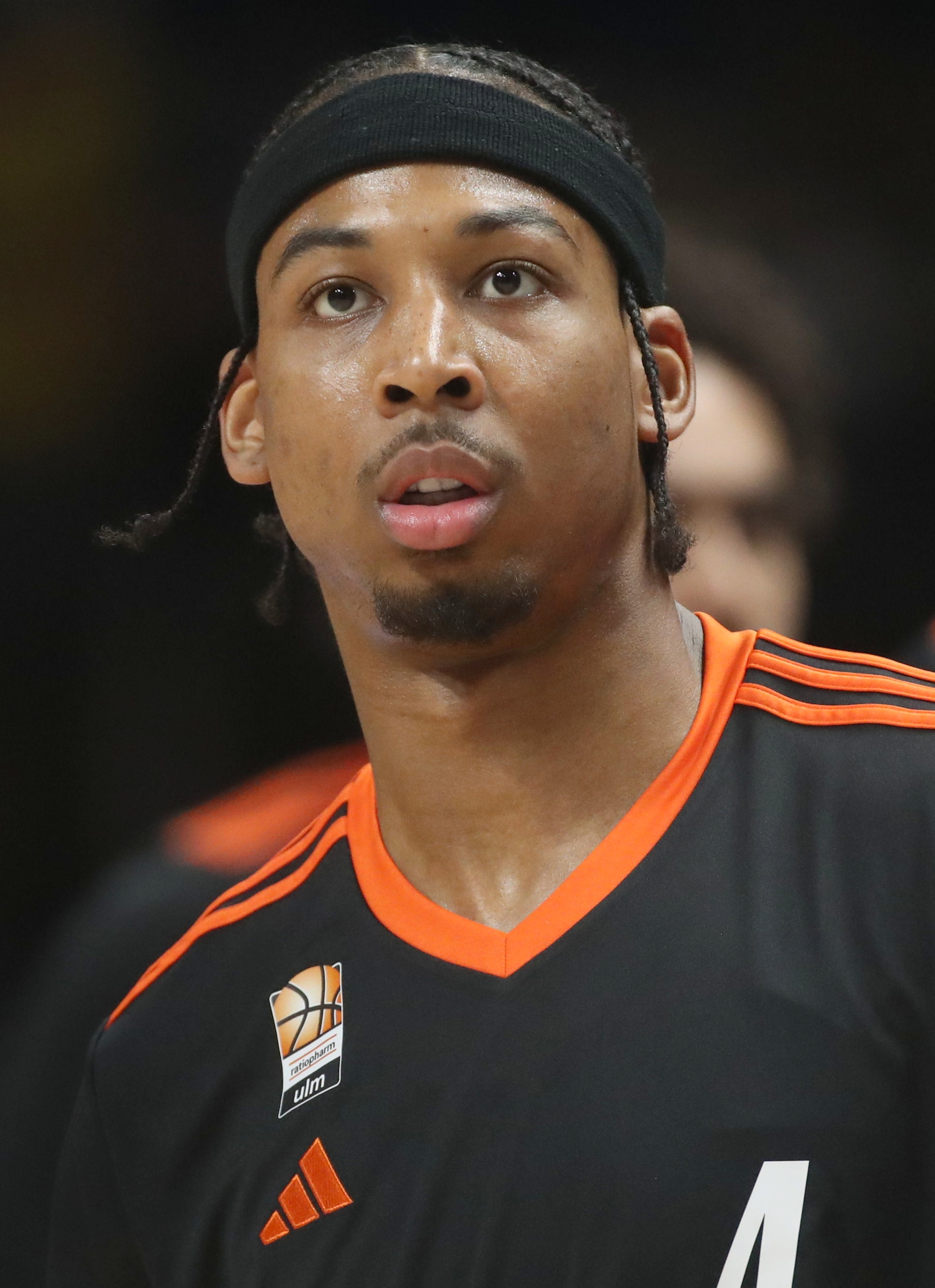
- Hinton with the Ratiopharm Ulm in 2025

No. 4 – Brisbane Bullets
- Position: Shooting guard / small forward
- League: NBL

Personal information
- Born: June 8, 1999 (age 27) Gastonia, North Carolina, U.S.
- Listed height: 6 ft 5 in (1.96 m)
- Listed weight: 210 lb (95 kg)

Career information
- High school: Forestview (Gastonia, North Carolina); Gaston Day School (Gastonia, North Carolina); Northside Christian (Charlotte, North Carolina)
- College: Houston (2018–2020)
- NBA draft: 2020: undrafted
- Playing career: 2020–present

Career history
- 2020–2021: Dallas Mavericks
- 2021: →Long Island Nets
- 2021: →Santa Cruz Warriors
- 2021–2022: Fort Wayne Mad Ants
- 2021–2022: Indiana Pacers
- 2022–2023: Cleveland Charge
- 2023–2024: Houston Rockets
- 2023–2024: →Rio Grande Valley Vipers
- 2024–2025: Rio Grande Valley Vipers
- 2025: Memphis Hustle
- 2025: Ratiopharm Ulm
- 2025–2026: Memphis Hustle
- 2026–present: Brisbane Bullets

Career highlights
- NBA G League All-Defensive Team (2024); Second-team All-AAC (2020); AAC All-Rookie Team (2019)
- Stats at NBA.com
- Stats at Basketball Reference

Nathaniel Robert Hinton (born June 8, 1999) is an American professional basketball player for the Brisbane Bullets of the Australian National Basketball League (NBL). He played college basketball for the Houston Cougars.

== High school career ==
Hinton started playing basketball as a freshman for Forestview High School in Gastonia, North Carolina, before transferring to Gaston Day School in the same city. For his sophomore season, he moved to Northside Christian Academy in Charlotte, North Carolina, averaging 18 points, six rebounds and four steals per game, and led his team to the North Carolina Independent Schools Athletic Association (NCISAA) 2A title game. Hinton returned to Gaston Day for his final two years of high school. As a junior, he averaged a team-high 19.1 points per game, helping his team reach the NCISAA 2A semi-finals.

After his junior season, Hinton led Team Loaded NC to the Adidas Gauntlet final, drawing the attention of several high-major NCAA Division I programs. As a senior, he averaged 19.9 points, 7.5 rebounds, 7.7 assists and four steals per game, helping Gaston Day to a NCISAA 2A runner-up finish. Hinton was an NCISAA 2A All-State selection and was named Gaston Gazette Player of the Year. He scored 2,217 points in his high school career.

=== Recruiting ===
Hinton was a consensus four-star recruit and committed to play college basketball for Houston. He became the top recruit to join the program under head coach Kelvin Sampson.

College recruiting
Name	Hometown	School	Height	Weight	Commit date
Nate Hinton; SG	Gastonia, NC	Gaston Day School (NC)	6 ft 6 in (1.98 m)	198 lb (90 kg)	Sep 17, 2017
Nate Hinton; SG	Recruit ratings: Rivals: 247Sports: ESPN: (81)				
Overall recruit ranking: Rivals: 127 247Sports: 116 ESPN: —
Note: In many cases, Scout, Rivals, 247Sports, On3, and ESPN may conflict in their listings of height and weight.; In these cases, the average was taken. ESPN grades are on a 100-point scale.; Sources: "Houston 2018 Basketball Commitments". Rivals.; "2018 Houston Cougars Recruiting Class". ESPN.; "2018 Team Ranking". Rivals.

== College career ==
Hinton was the preseason Freshman of the Year in the American Athletic Conference (AAC). On January 6, 2019, he was named AAC Freshman of the Week after recording a season-high 19 points and nine rebounds in a 90–77 win over Memphis. On March 10, Hinton posted his first double-double of 16 points and 11 rebounds in an 85–69 victory over Cincinnati, helping Houston clinch the AAC regular season title. As a freshman, he averaged 7.2 points, 4.4 rebounds and 1.1 assists per game and was selected to the AAC All-Freshman Team.

On December 11, 2019, Hinton recorded a sophomore season-high 25 points and 10 rebounds in a 71–63 win over UT Arlington. He tallied career-highs and set Fertitta Center records of 16 rebounds and five steals, to go with 20 points, in a 78–63 victory over UCF on January 3, 2020. As a sophomore, Hinton averaged 10.6 points, 8.7 rebounds, two assists and 1.4 steals per game, earning second-team All-AAC honors. He was also named to the NABC All-District 24 first team. On April 5, he declared for the 2020 NBA draft while maintaining his college eligibility. On May 18, Hinton announced that he had hired an agent and would remain in the draft, forgoing his remaining two years of college eligibility.

== Professional career ==
=== Dallas Mavericks (2020–2021) ===
After going undrafted in the 2020 NBA draft, Hinton signed a two-way contract with the Dallas Mavericks. Due to the Mavericks' NBA G League affiliate, the Texas Legends, opting not to participate in the G League hub season, Hinton joined the Long Island Nets on February 2, 2021. He played for Long Island on February 10 and February 12 before joining the Santa Cruz Warriors, where he played out the rest of the G League hub season. He returned to the Mavericks in mid March 2021.

On August 3, 2021, Hinton signed a new two-way contract with the Mavericks. After playing for the Mavericks at the 2021 NBA Summer League, he was waived on August 27.

=== Indiana Pacers / Fort Wayne Mad Ants (2021–2022) ===
On September 7, 2021, Hinton signed with the Indiana Pacers. He was waived by the Pacers on October 15 and subsequently joined their G League affiliate, the Fort Wayne Mad Ants. On December 30, he signed a 10-day contract with Indiana. He played two games for Indiana on December 31 and January 5, before re-joining Fort Wayne on January 9. On April 7, 2022, he signed a two-way contract with Indiana. He became a free agent in July 2022 but played for the Pacers during the 2022 NBA Summer League.

=== Cleveland Charge (2022–2023) ===
On September 19, 2022, Hinton signed with the Cleveland Cavaliers. He was waived on October 15 and subsequently joined the Cleveland Charge for the 2022–23 NBA G League season.

=== Houston Rockets / Rio Grande Valley Vipers (2023–2025) ===
In July 2023, Hinton played for the Houston Rockets in the 2023 NBA Summer League. On August 2, he signed with the Rockets. He was waived by the Rockets on October 21, but was re-signed to a two-way deal two days later. He split the 2023–24 season with the Rockets and their G League affiliate, the Rio Grande Valley Vipers.

On July 4, 2024, Hinton signed a standard contract with the Rockets, and played for the team in the 2024 NBA Summer League. He was waived on October 19 and subsequently re-joined the Vipers for the 2024–25 NBA G League season.

=== Memphis Hustle (2025) ===
On January 10, 2025, Hinton was traded to the Memphis Hustle. He appeared in 31 games for the Hustle to finish the G League season.

=== Ratiopharm Ulm (2025) ===
On March 31, 2025, Hinton signed with Ratiopharm Ulm of the German Basketball Bundesliga. In 20 games to finish the 2024–25 BBL season, he averaged 3.4 points, 3.5 rebounds and 1.2 assists per game.

=== Return to Memphis Hustle (2025–2026) ===
In July 2025, Hinton joined the Memphis Grizzlies for the 2025 NBA Summer League. He signed with the Grizzlies on October 16 and was then waived two days later. He subsequently re-joined the Memphis Hustle for the 2025–26 NBA G League season. He was deactivated by the Hustle on February 25, 2026.

=== Brisbane Bullets (2026–present) ===
On July 13, 2026, Hinton signed with the Brisbane Bullets of the Australian National Basketball League (NBL) for the 2026–27 season.

== Career statistics ==
Legend
GP	Games played	GS	Games started	MPG	Minutes per game
FG%	Field goal percentage	3P%	3-point field goal percentage	FT%	Free throw percentage
RPG	Rebounds per game	APG	Assists per game	SPG	Steals per game
BPG	Blocks per game	PPG	Points per game	**Bold**	Career high

=== NBA ===
==== Regular season ====
Year	Team	GP	GS	MPG	FG%	3P%	FT%	RPG	APG	SPG	BPG	PPG
2020–21	Dallas	**21**	0	4.4	.357	.211	.700	.4	.4	**.3**	**.1**	2.0
2021–22	Indiana	2	0	1.2	.000	—	—	.0	.0	.0	.0	.0
2023–24	Houston	15	0	**5.0**	**.423**	**.500**	**.800**	**1.5**	**.7**	.2	**.1**	**2.2**
Career		38	0	4.5	.377	.333	.733	.8	.5	.3	.1	1.9

=== College ===
Year	Team	GP	GS	MPG	FG%	3P%	FT%	RPG	APG	SPG	BPG	PPG
2018–19	Houston	**37**	1	19.2	**.413**	.337	**.857**	4.4	1.2	1.0	.1	7.2
2019–20	Houston	31	**31**	**30.3**	.410	**.387**	.756	**8.7**	**2.0**	**1.4**	**.2**	**10.6**
Career		68	32	24.3	.411	.366	.800	6.4	1.6	1.2	.1	8.8

== Personal life ==
Hinton's father, Dr. Benjamin Hinton, has been the pastor of Tabernacle Baptist Church in Gastonia since March 1991. Hinton had a religious upbringing.
