= Jaylon Brown =

American basketball player (born 1994)

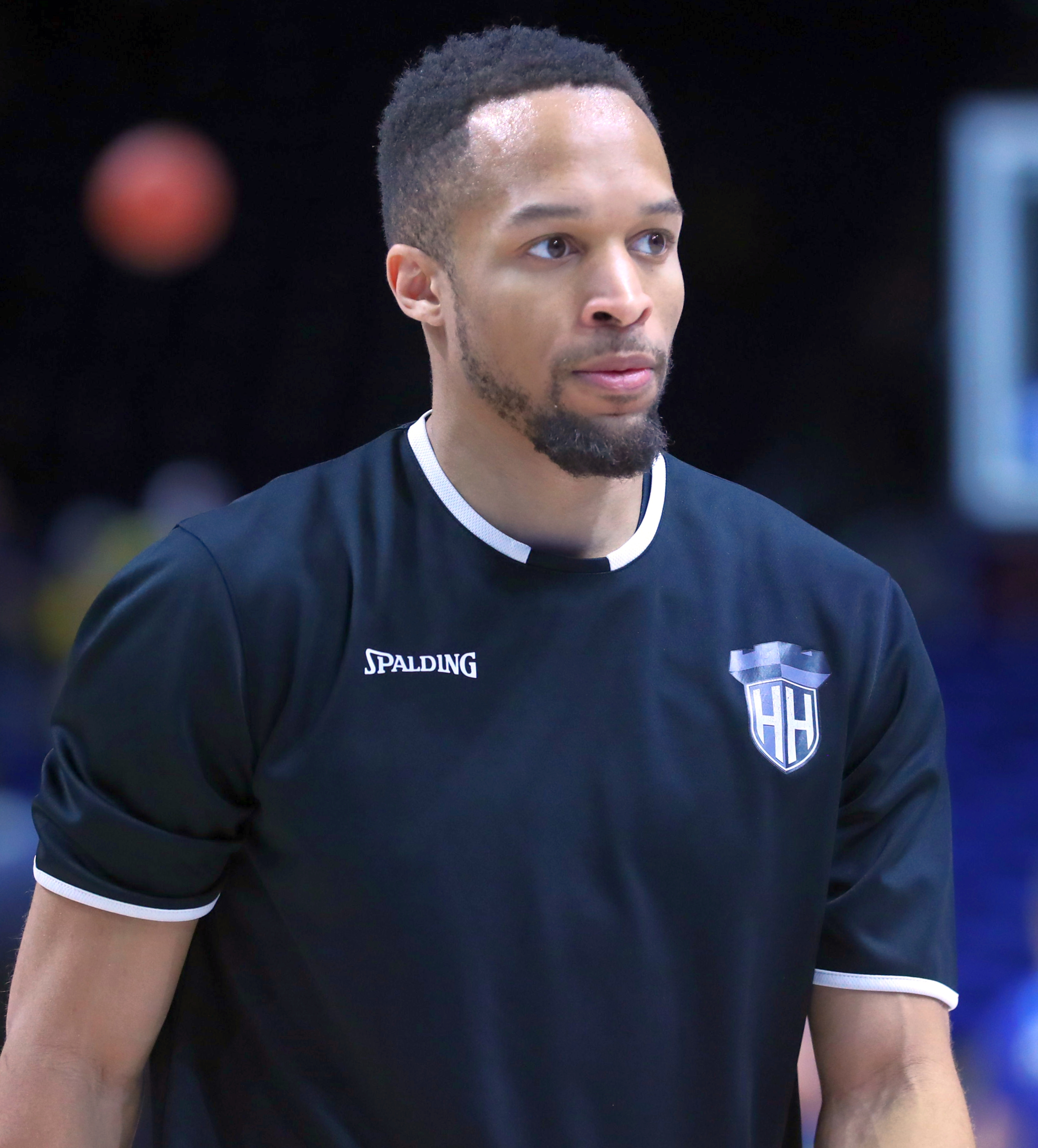
- Brown with Hamburg Towers in 2022

No. 3 – Cairns Taipans
- Position: Point guard / shooting guard
- League: NBL

Personal information
- Born: September 11, 1994 (age 32) Fishers, Indiana, U.S
- Listed height: 6 ft 0 in (1.83 m)
- Listed weight: 185 lb (84 kg)

Career information
- High school: Fishers (Fishers, Indiana)
- College: Evansville (2013–2017)
- NBA draft: 2017: undrafted
- Playing career: 2017–present

Career history
- 2017: Karpoš Sokoli
- 2018: Vilpas Vikings
- 2018–2021: Bilbao
- 2021–2022: Hamburg Towers
- 2022–2024: Pınar Karşıyaka
- 2024–2025: Bursaspor
- 2025–2026: Liaoning Flying Leopards
- 2026: Petkim Spor
- 2026–present: Cairns Taipans

Career highlights
- Second-team All-MVC (2017)

Jaylon Marcus Brown (born September 11, 1994) is an American professional basketball player for the Cairns Taipans of the Australian National Basketball League (NBL). He played college basketball for the Evansville Purple Aces.

== College career ==
Brown played college basketball for the Evansville Purple Aces between 2013 and 2017. As a senior, he led the Missouri Valley Conference in scoring with 20.9 points per game and was named to the MVC All-Tournament Team.

== Professional career ==
On August 5, 2017, Brown signed with Karpoš Sokoli of the Macedonian First League. On October 12, 2017, he made his debut for Sokoli against MZT Skopje scoring 15 points in an 83–85 away win in Jane Sandanski Arena. He left the team in November 2017.

In February 2018, Brown joined Vilpas Vikings of the Finnish Korisliiga. In 27 games over the rest of the 2017–18 season, he averaged 15.5 points, 2.9 rebounds and 3.4 assists per game.

On July 25, 2018, Brown signed with RETAbet Bilbao Basket of the LEB Oro for the 2018–19 season. He continued with Bilbao in 2019–20 and 2020–21 in the Liga ACB.

On July 21, 2021, Brown signed with Hamburg Towers of the German Basketball Bundesliga and EuroCup.

On June 28, 2022, Brown signed with Pınar Karşıyaka of the Turkish Basketbol Süper Ligi (BSL). He continued with Pınar Karşıyaka in the 2023–24 season.

On August 1, 2024, Brown signed with Bursaspor Basketbol of the BSL.

Brown joined the Liaoning Flying Leopards of the Chinese Basketball Association for the 2025–26 season. In January 2026, he left Liaoning and returned to Turkey, signing with Petkim Spor for the rest of the BSL season.

On August 7, 2026, Brown signed with the Cairns Taipans of the Australian National Basketball League (NBL) for the 2026–27 season.
