= Yannis Morin =

French basketball player

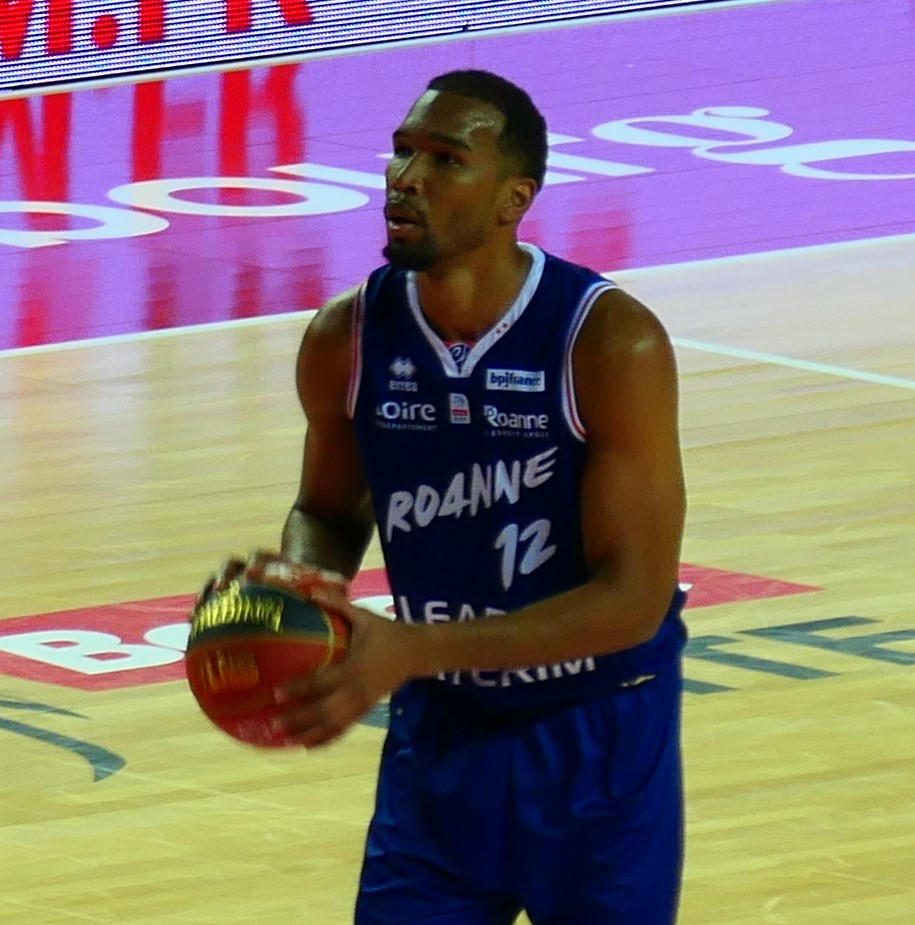
- Morin in 2023

No. 12 – South East Melbourne Phoenix
- Position: Power forward / center
- League: NBL

Personal information
- Born: August 31, 1993 (age 33) Fort-de-France, France
- Listed height: 6 ft 10 in (2.08 m)
- Listed weight: 210 lb (95 kg)

Career information
- NBA draft: 2015: undrafted
- Playing career: 2012–present

Career history
- 2012–2015: Cholet
- 2015–2016: Denain-Voltaire
- 2016–2017: Le Havre
- 2017–2018: Oklahoma City Blue
- 2018: Le Mans Sarthe
- 2018: Nanterre 92
- 2018–2020: Champagne Châlons-Reims
- 2020–2022: SIG Strasbourg
- 2022–2024: Chorale Roanne Basket
- 2024: UCAM Murcia
- 2024–2025: Akita Northern Happinets
- 2025: La Laguna Tenerife
- 2025–2026: Toyama Grouses
- 2026: Joventut Badalona
- 2026–present: South East Melbourne Phoenix

Career highlights
- Pro A champion (2018)
- Stats at Basketball Reference

Yannis Mario Morin (born August 31, 1993) is a French professional basketball player for the South East Melbourne Phoenix of the Australian National Basketball League (NBL).

== Early life and career ==
Born in Fort-de-France, capital of the French overseas department of Martinique, Morin went through the youth ranks of Golden Lion Basketball in Saint-Joseph, Martinique, before joining the Pôle Espoirs de Martinique. He enrolled at INSEP in 2008.

Morin played for Centre Federal du Basket-Ball in the NM1 between 2009 and 2012.

== Professional career ==
Between 2012 and 2015, Morin played for Cholet Basket in the LNB Pro A.

For the 2025–16 season, Morin joined Denain-Voltaire of the LNB Pro B. He averaged 7.5 points per game.

Morin joined STB Le Havre for the 2016–17 Pro B season. In 37 games, he averaged 6.8 points, 7.4 rebounds, 1.7 assists, 1.0 steals and 1.8 blocks per game.

In July 2017, Morin joined the Oklahoma City Thunder for the 2017 NBA Summer League. On October 11, he signed with the Thunder. He was waived on October 14 as one of the team's final preseason roster cuts and then joined the Oklahoma City Blue of the NBA G League. In 34 games during the 2017–18 NBA G League season, he averaged 5.6 points and 4.2 rebounds per game. On April 14, 2018, he signed with Le Mans Sarthe for the rest of the LNB Pro A season. He saw action in 12 games of the Pro A playoffs, averaging 2.7 points and 1.8 boards a contest, en route to winning the French championship.

Morin joined Nanterre 92 for the 2018–19 season. After nine games to start the season, he joined Champagne Châlons-Reims Basket in October 2018.

In July 2019, Morin joined the Oklahoma City Thunder for the 2019 NBA Summer League. He later re-joined Champagne Châlons-Reims Basket for the 2019–20 season.

In May 2020, Morin signed with SIG Strasbourg. He played for Strasbourg in 2020–21 and 2021–22.

In May 2022, Morin signed with Chorale Roanne Basket. He played for Chorale Roanne in 2022–23 and 2023–24.

In May 2024, Morin joined UCAM Murcia CB of the Spanish Liga ACB for the rest of the 2023–24 season. In 10 games, he averaged 7.4 points and 5.7 rebounds per game.

In July 2024, Morin signed with the Akita Northern Happinets of the Japanese B.League. In June 2025, he joined La Laguna Tenerife for the 2025 ACB Playoffs.

Morin joined the Toyama Grouses for the 2025–26 B.League season. In May 2026, he joined Joventut Badalona for the rest of the Liga ACB season.

On August 13, 2026, Morin signed with the South East Melbourne Phoenix of the Australian National Basketball League (NBL) for the 2026–27 season.

== National team career ==
Morin represented the French national team at the 2009 FIBA Europe Under-16 Championship and the 2010 FIBA Europe Under-18 Championship.
