= Nick Rakocevic =

Serbian basketball player (born 1997)

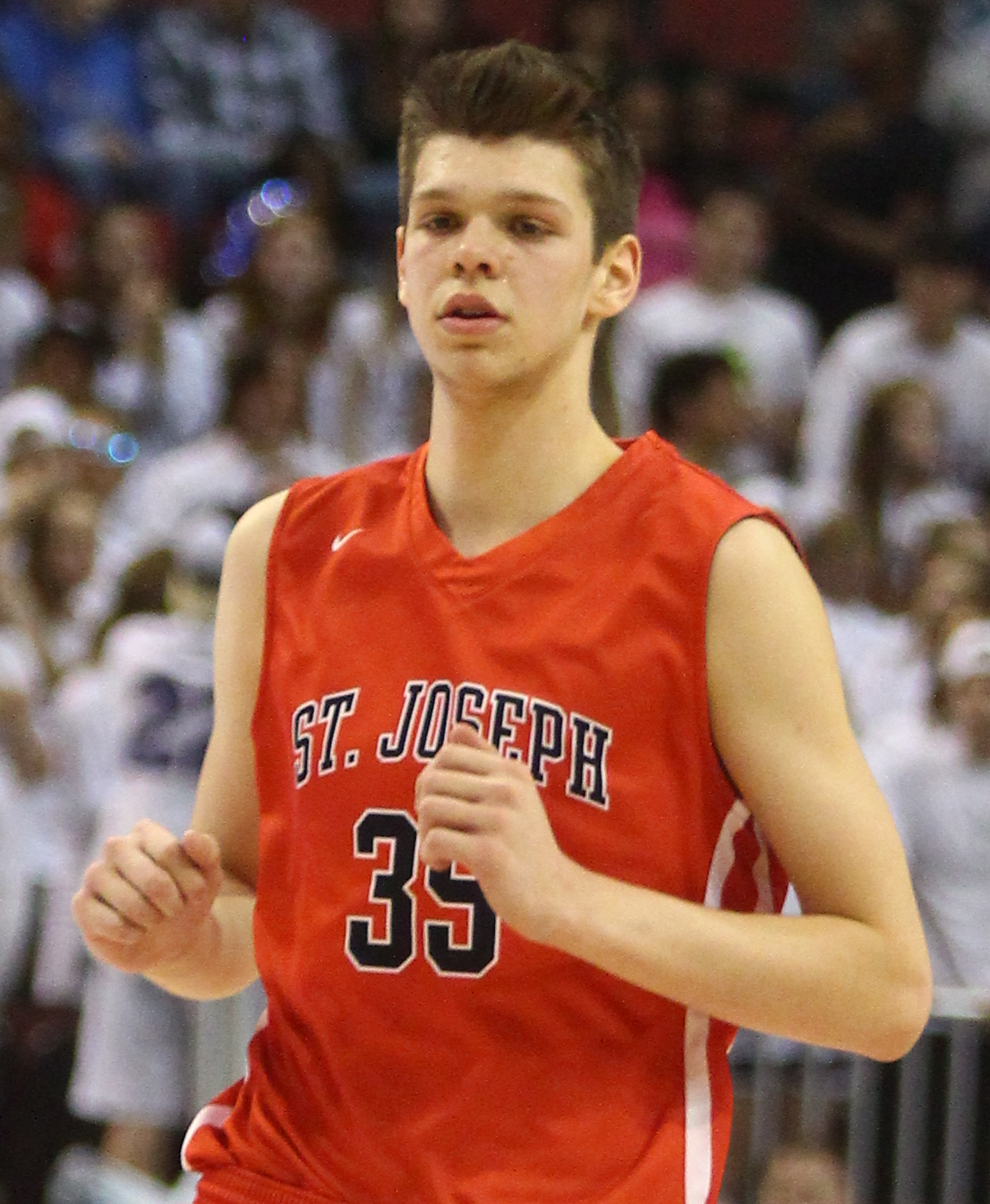
- Rakocevic with St. Joseph HS in 2015

No. 31 – Adelaide 36ers
- Position: Power forward
- League: NBL

Personal information
- Born: December 31, 1997 (age 28) Chicago, Illinois, U.S.
- Listed height: 6 ft 11 in (2.11 m)
- Listed weight: 225 lb (102 kg)

Career information
- High school: St. Joseph (Westchester, Illinois)
- College: USC (2016–2020)
- NBA draft: 2020: undrafted
- Playing career: 2020–present

Career history
- 2020–2022: Zhejiang Golden Bulls
- 2022: Magnolia Hotshots
- 2023: Zhejiang Golden Bulls
- 2023–2024: Jilin Northeast Tigers
- 2024: Sagesse SC
- 2024–2025: Ningbo Rockets
- 2025: Santeros de Aguada
- 2025: Capitanes de Arecibo
- 2025–present: Adelaide 36ers
- 2026: Guangdong Southern Tigers

Nicholas Rakocevic (Serbian Cyrillic: Никола Ракочевић; born December 31, 1997) is an American-Serbian professional basketball player for the Adelaide 36ers of the Australian National Basketball League (NBL). He played college basketball for the USC Trojans before beginning his professional career in China in 2020. Born in the United States, he holds Serbian citizenship and has played for the Serbia under-20 national team.

== High school career ==
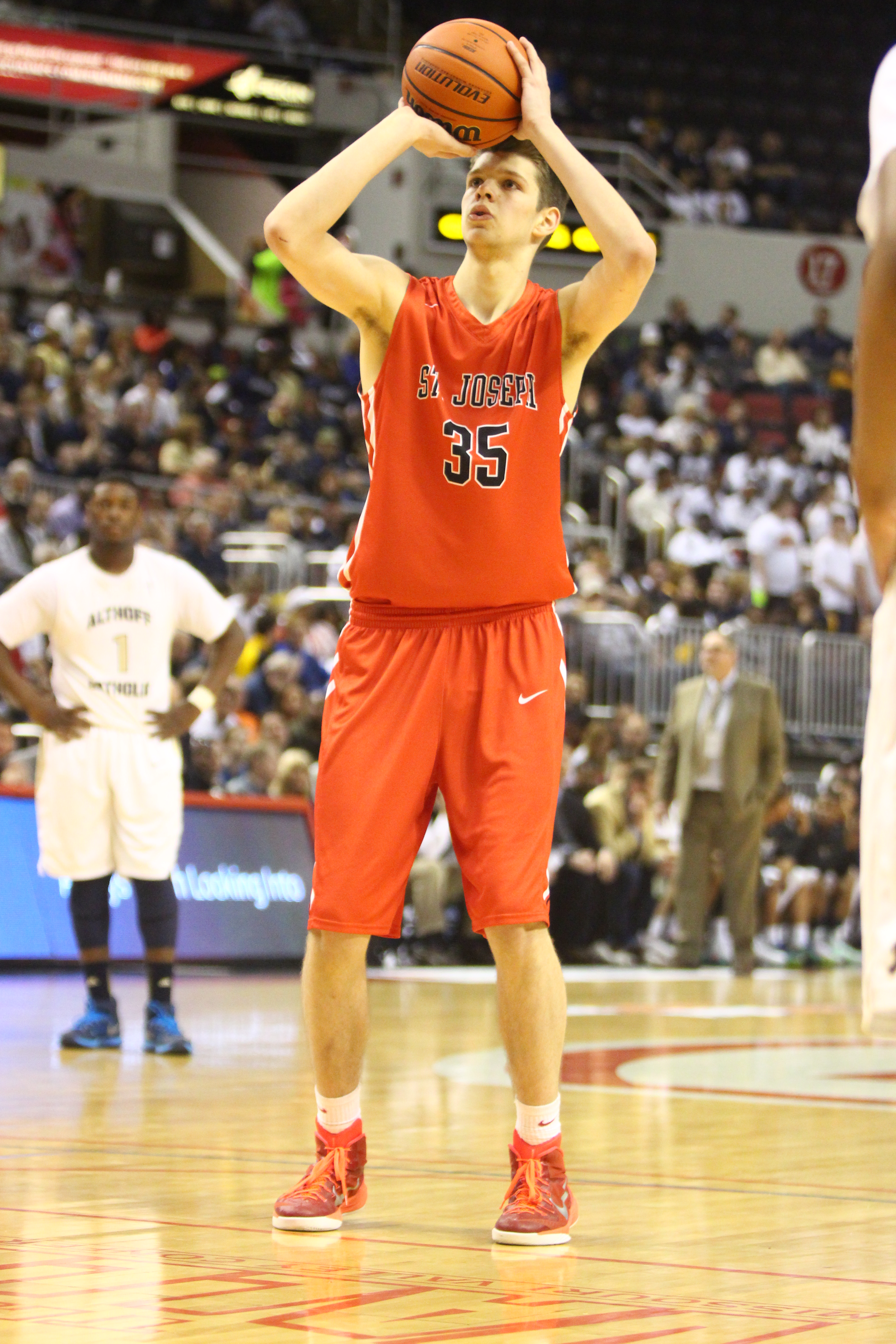
Rakocevic in 2015

Rakocevic was born in Chicago to Momo and Denise Rakocevic. His father emigrated from Belgrade, Serbia at age 25. Rakocevic played for St. Joseph High School in Westchester, Illinois under coach Gene Pingatore. As a junior, he was a starter on the Class 3A state championship team. In his senior season, Rakocevic averaged 19.8 points, 14.4 rebounds and four blocks per game, leading his team to the Class 3A Westinghouse Sectional title. He earned First Team All-State honors from the Chicago Tribune. On April 11, 2016, he committed to play college basketball for USC over offers from UNLV, Arizona State and Florida.

== College career ==
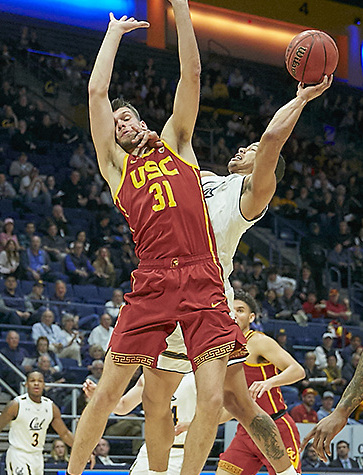
Rakocevic contests a shot by Matt Bradley in 2019

Rakocevic averaged 5.2 points and 4.2 rebounds per game as a freshman at USC, serving as a part-time starter. On March 13, 2018, he recorded 24 points and a career-high 19 rebounds in a 103–98 double overtime win over UNC Asheville. He grabbed the most rebounds by a USC player in a game since David Bluthenthal in 2000. As a sophomore, Rakocevic averaged 8.1 points and 6.2 rebounds per game, shooting 62.7 percent, the second-highest field goal percentage in program history. In his junior season, he averaged 14.7 points, 9.3 rebounds and 1.4 blocks per game. Rakocevic was a two-time Pac-12 Player of the Week and was named All-Pac-12 Honorable Mention. On November 12, 2019, he tied his career-high of 27 points, grabbed 16 rebounds and reached 1,000 career points, in an 84–66 victory over South Dakota State. As a senior, Rakocevic averaged 10.5 points and 8.3 rebounds per game.

== Professional career ==
In September 2020, Rakocevic signed with the Zhejiang Golden Bulls of the Chinese Basketball Association (CBA). He played two seasons for the Golden Bulls in 2020–21 and 2021–22.

In August 2022, Rakocevic signed with the Magnolia Hotshots of the Philippine Basketball Association (PBA) as the team's import for the 2022–23 PBA Commissioner's Cup. He played 17 games for the Hotshots between September 28 and December 21. In April 2023, he re-joined the Zhejiang Golden Bulls for the rest of the 2022–23 CBA season.

For the 2023–24 season, Rakocevic joined the Jilin Northeast Tigers of the CBA. In April 2024, he joined Sagesse SC of the Lebanese Basketball League.

On September 26, 2024, Rakocevic signed with the Ningbo Rockets of the CBA.

In March 2025, Rakocevic joined Santeros de Aguada of the Baloncesto Superior Nacional. He played 15 games for Aguada before joining Capitanes de Arecibo in May. After five games Arecibo, he played one more game for Aguada on June 22.

On September 26, 2025, Rakocevic signed with the Adelaide 36ers of the Australian National Basketball League (NBL) for the 2025–26 season. On December 15, he received a two-game ban with one suspended after he committed a disqualifying foul on Finn Delany in a match against Melbourne United. On January 30, 2026, Rakocevic was charged with engaging in unsportsmanlike behaviour in a melee against the Brisbane Bullets and had to serve the one-game ban that had been suspended. He averaged 8.5 points and 6.4 rebounds per game while playing a key role in the club's run to the Championship Series.

On April 13, 2026, Rakocevic re-signed with the 36ers for the 2026–27 NBL season.

== National team career ==
Rakocevic played for the Serbia under-20 national team at the 2017 FIBA U20 European Championship in Greece. He averaged 6.3 points and 3.9 rebounds per game, helping his team finish in fifth place.

== Career statistics ==
Legend
GP	Games played	GS	Games started	MPG	Minutes per game
FG%	Field goal percentage	3P%	3-point field goal percentage	FT%	Free throw percentage
RPG	Rebounds per game	APG	Assists per game	SPG	Steals per game
BPG	Blocks per game	PPG	Points per game	**Bold**	Career high

=== College ===
Year	Team	GP	GS	MPG	FG%	3P%	FT%	RPG	APG	SPG	BPG	PPG
2016–17	USC	**36**	8	14.9	.563	–	.671	3.7	.4	.3	.6	5.2
2017–18	USC	**36**	22	21.1	**.627**	–	.548	6.2	.5	.7	.5	8.1
2018–19	USC	33	**30**	**30.0**	.548	.000	**.679**	**9.3**	1.3	.8	**1.4**	**14.7**
2019–20	USC	31	29	27.3	.458	**.429**	.634	8.3	**1.5**	**1.2**	1.0	10.5
Career		136	89	23.1	.540	.360	.643	6.8	.9	.7	.9	9.5
