= Charles Bediako =

Canadian basketball player (born 2002)

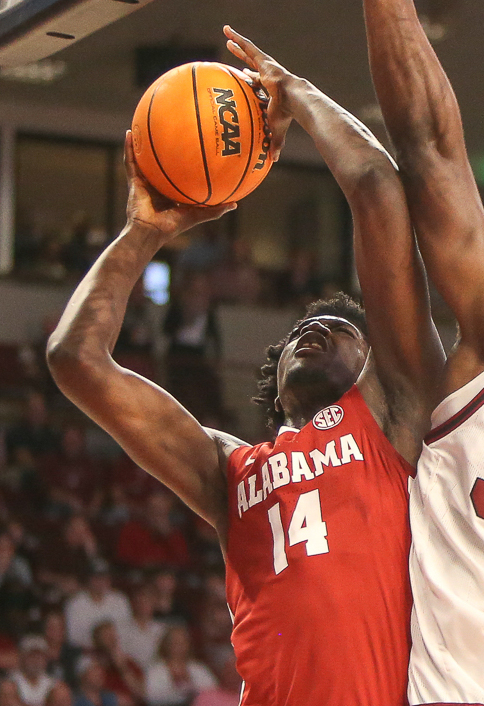
- Bediako with Alabama in 2023

No. 8 – New Zealand Breakers
- Position: Center
- League: NBL

Personal information
- Born: March 10, 2002 (age 24)
- Listed height: 6 ft 11 in (2.11 m)
- Listed weight: 225 lb (102 kg)

Career information
- High school: Ridley College (St. Catharines, Ontario); Andrews Osborne Academy (Willoughby, Ohio); IMG Academy (Bradenton, Florida)
- College: Alabama (2021–2023, 2026)
- NBA draft: 2023: undrafted
- Playing career: 2023–present

Career history
- 2023–2024: Austin Spurs
- 2024–2025: Grand Rapids Gold
- 2025–2026: Motor City Cruise
- 2026: Scarborough Shooting Stars
- 2026–present: New Zealand Breakers

Career highlights
- SEC All-Freshman Team (2022); Jordan Brand Classic (2021)
- Stats at NBA.com
- Stats at Basketball Reference
Medals
Men's basketball
Representing Canada
FIBA Under-19 World Cup
Bronze medal – third place	2021 Latvia	Team
FIBA Americas U18 Championship
Silver medal – second place	2018 Canada	Team

Charles A. Bediako Jr. (born March 10, 2002) is an American and Canadian professional basketball player for the New Zealand Breakers of the Australian National Basketball League (NBL). After playing for Alabama between 2021 and 2023, Bediako played three seasons in the NBA G League. In January 2026, he briefly returned to Alabama before being denied eligibility by a Tuscaloosa judge the following month.

== High school career ==
Bediako began his high school career at Ridley College in St. Catharines, Ontario, in 2018, playing alongside his brother Jaden. In 2019, Bediako transferred to Andrews Osborne Academy in Willoughby, Ohio, for his junior year. As a senior in 2020–21, Bediako played for IMG Academy in Bradenton, Florida, where he averaged 13.2 points and 12.7 rebounds per game. He was selected to the 2021 Jordan Brand Classic game.

=== Recruiting ===
Bediako was a consensus four-star recruit and one of the top centers in the 2021 class. On April 6, 2021, he committed to playing college basketball for Alabama over offers from Duke, Michigan, Texas and Ohio State.

College recruiting
Name	Hometown	School	Height	Weight	Commit date
Charles Bediako; C	Brampton, ON	IMG Academy (FL)	6 ft 11 in (2.11 m)	215 lb (98 kg)	Apr 6, 2021
Charles Bediako; C	Recruit ratings: Rivals: 247Sports: ESPN: (88)				
Overall recruit ranking: Rivals: 39 247Sports: 32 ESPN: 35
Note: In many cases, Scout, Rivals, 247Sports, On3, and ESPN may conflict in their listings of height and weight.; In these cases, the average was taken. ESPN grades are on a 100-point scale.; Sources: "Alabama 2021 Basketball Commitments". Rivals.; "2021 Alabama Crimson Tide Recruiting Class". ESPN.; "2021 Team Ranking". Rivals.

== College career ==
=== First stint (2021–2023) ===
As a freshman for the Crimson Tide in 2021–22, Bediako averaged 6.7 points, 4.3 rebounds and 1.7 blocks per game. He was named to the SEC All-Freshman Team.

As a sophomore in 2022–23, Bediako averaged 6.4 points, 6.0 rebounds, 0.6 assists and 1.8 blocks per game.

On March 31, 2023, Bediako announced that he would enter the NBA Draft pool and sign with an agent while maintaining his eligibility. He competed in the NBA G League Elite Camp, but he did not earn an invitation to the NBA Draft Combine. At the Elite Camp, Bediako was measured at 6 foot 10 without shoes and weighed 223.4 pounds. He also recorded a 7-foot-3 wingspan.

Despite not being invited to the NBA Draft Combine, Bediako announced on May 24, 2023, that he would forgo his remaining collegiate eligibility and persist with entering the NBA draft. He went on to completed pre-draft workouts with the Memphis Grizzlies, Portland Trail Blazers, Utah Jazz, Oklahoma City Thunder, Dallas Mavericks, San Antonio Spurs, Charlotte Hornets, Boston Celtics, and Toronto Raptors.

=== Second stint (2026) ===
In January 2026, Bediako became the center of a major eligibility and legal controversy after attempting to return to college basketball at Alabama following time in the NBA G League. Bediako had entered the 2023 NBA draft, signed a two-way contract with the San Antonio Spurs, and played professionally in the G League, actions that traditionally make an athlete permanently ineligible for NCAA competition. After the NCAA denied Alabama's request for his reinstatement, Bediako filed a lawsuit against the organization, arguing that recent eligibility decisions had been inconsistent and unfairly restrictive. A Tuscaloosa County Circuit Court judge issued a temporary restraining order allowing him to practice and compete for Alabama while the case proceeded, marking an unprecedented challenge to long standing NCAA amateurism rules. The case drew national attention and sparked debate among coaches, administrators, and legal experts about the future of college eligibility rules in the era of name image and likeness compensation and professional pathways.

On January 21, Bediako was granted the temporary restraining order, which allowed him to return to briefly play with the Crimson Tide during the 2025–26 season. On February 9, his temporary restraining order expired and he was denied a motion to play out the 2025–26 NCAA season. He played five games for Alabama between January 24 and February 7, helping the team go 3–2 over that stretch.

== Professional career ==
=== Austin Spurs (2023–2024) ===
After going undrafted in the 2023 NBA draft, Bediako joined the San Antonio Spurs for the 2023 NBA Summer League. On October 2, 2023, he was named in the Spurs' training camp roster. On October 23, his deal was converted into a two-way contract. After suffering a torn meniscus that ruled him out for six to eight weeks, he was waived by the Spurs on December 29. He did not play for San Antonio, but made 11 appearances with the Austin Spurs of the NBA G League, averaging 7.7 points and 6.9 rebounds in 19.0 minutes.

On March 7, 2024, Bediako rejoined the Austin Spurs for the rest of the 2023–24 NBA G League season.

=== Grand Rapids Gold (2024–2025) ===
In July 2024, Bediako joined the Orlando Magic for the 2024 NBA Summer League. He signed with the Denver Nuggets on October 8, but was later waived on October 16. He subsequently joined the Grand Rapids Gold for the 2024–25 NBA G League season. He appeared in 50 games for the Gold, averaging 9.9 points, 8.6 rebounds, and 1.1 blocks per contest.

=== Motor City Cruise (2025–2026) ===
On September 17, 2025, Bediako signed with the Detroit Pistons. He was waived by the Pistons on October 17. He subsequently joined the Motor City Cruise for the 2025–26 NBA G League season. His contract with the NBA G League was terminated on January 27, 2026.

=== Scarborough Shooting Stars (2026) ===
On May 6, 2026, Bediako signed with the Scarborough Shooting Stars of the Canadian Elite Basketball League (CEBL).

=== New Zealand Breakers (2026–present) ===
On August 11, 2026, Bediako signed with the New Zealand Breakers of the Australian National Basketball League (NBL) for the 2026–27 season.

== National team career ==
Bediako has competed internationally for the Canada men's national under-19 basketball team. He averaged 1.8 points and 2 rebounds per game in the 2018 FIBA Under-18 Americas Championship as Canada finished second in the tournament. In the 2018 FIBA Under-17 Basketball World Cup, Bediako averaged 3.3 points and 3.1 rebounds per game as Canada finished fourth in the tournament. In the 2021 FIBA Under-19 Basketball World Cup, Bediako averaged four points and 2.9 rebounds per game, helping Canada win the bronze medal.

== Career statistics ==
Legend
GP	Games played	GS	Games started	MPG	Minutes per game
FG%	Field goal percentage	3P%	3-point field goal percentage	FT%	Free throw percentage
RPG	Rebounds per game	APG	Assists per game	SPG	Steals per game
BPG	Blocks per game	PPG	Points per game	**Bold**	Career high

=== College ===
Year	Team	GP	GS	MPG	FG%	3P%	FT%	RPG	APG	SPG	BPG	PPG
2021–22	Alabama	33	30	17.8	.692	.000	.612	4.3	**.7**	.6	1.5	6.7
2022–23	Alabama	**37**	**37**	20.7	.659	.000	.355	**6.0**	.6	.6	**1.8**	6.4
2025–26	Alabama	5	2	**21.6**	**.773**	.000	**.696**	4.6	.2	**.8**	1.4	**10.0**
Career		75	69	19.5	.680	.000	.520	5.2	.6	.6	1.7	6.8

== Personal life ==
Bediako holds dual American and Canadian citizenship and is of Ghanaian descent. His brother, Jaden, played college basketball for Santa Clara and Seton Hall. His sister, Jada, plays college basketball for Marquette.
