= Andrew Carr (basketball) =

American basketball player (born 2002)

No. 11 – Sydney Kings
- Position: Power forward
- League: NBL

Personal information
- Born: February 1, 2002 (age 24) Paoli, Pennsylvania, U.S.
- Listed height: 6 ft 11 in (2.11 m)
- Listed weight: 235 lb (107 kg)

Career information
- High school: West Chester East (West Chester, Pennsylvania)
- College: Delaware (2020–2022); Wake Forest (2022–2024); Kentucky (2024–2025)
- NBA draft: 2025: undrafted
- Playing career: 2025–present

Career history
- 2025–2026: Rip City Remix
- 2026–present: Sydney Kings
- Stats at NBA.com
- Stats at Basketball Reference

Andrew Philip Carr (born February 1, 2002) is an American professional basketball player for the Sydney Kings of the Australian National Basketball League (NBL). He played college basketball for the Delaware Fightin' Blue Hens, the Wake Forest Demon Deacons, and the Kentucky Wildcats.

== Early life and high school ==
Coming out of high school, Carr committed to play college basketball for the Delaware Fightin' Blue Hens.

== College career ==
=== Delaware ===
In the 2022 CAA Tournament championship game, Carr posted 17 points and 12 rebounds in a win over UNC Wilmington to advance to the 2022 NCAA Division I men's basketball tournament. In the first round of the tournament, he put up 13 points, three rebounds, and an assist versus Villanova. In two seasons with the Fightin' Blue Hens from 2020 to 2022, Carr appeared in 49 games with 44 starts, where he averaged 9.4 points, 4.7 rebounds, 1.4 assists, and a block per game. After the 2021-22 season, Carr entered his name into the NCAA transfer portal.

=== Wake Forest ===
Carr transferred to play for the Wake Forest Demon Deacons. In 2022-23, he started all 33 games and averaged 10.8 points and 6.2 rebounds per game. In the second round of the 2024 National Invitation Tournament, Carr put up 31 points and 11 rebounds in a loss to Georgia. In the 2023-24 season, he averaged 13.5 points, 6.8 rebounds, 1.5 assists, and 1.5 blocked per game. After the season, Carr once again entered his name into the NCAA transfer portal.

=== Kentucky ===
Carr transferred to play for the Kentucky Wildcats. On December 11, 2024, he notched 11 points and ten rebounds in a win over Colgate. On January 11, 2025, Carr recorded 13 points and six rebounds in a win over Mississippi State. On February 19, 2025, he recorded 11 points, two rebounds, an assist, a block, and a steal in a win over Vanderbilt. On February 22, 2025, Carr tallied 17 points, six rebounds, two assists, and two steals versus Alabama.

== Professional career ==
After going undrafted in the 2025 NBA draft, Carr joined the Portland Trail Blazers for the 2025 NBA Summer League. He signed with the Trail Blazers on October 3 and was then waived four days later. He subsequently joined the Rip City Remix of the NBA G League for the 2025–26 season. In 47 games, he averaged 10.8 points and 6.7 rebounds per game.

In July 2026, Carr joined the Trail Blazers for the 2026 NBA Summer League.

On August 14, 2026, Carr signed with the Sydney Kings of the Australian National Basketball League (NBL) as an injury replacement player for Keli Leaupepe. On October 22, he recorded 16 points and 20 rebounds in a 108–82 win over the Illawarra Hawks, setting a new Sydney record for rebounds off the bench.

== Career statistics ==
Legend
GP	Games played	GS	Games started	MPG	Minutes per game
FG%	Field goal percentage	3P%	3-point field goal percentage	FT%	Free throw percentage
RPG	Rebounds per game	APG	Assists per game	SPG	Steals per game
BPG	Blocks per game	PPG	Points per game	**Bold**	Career high

=== College ===
Year	Team	GP	GS	MPG	FG%	3P%	FT%	RPG	APG	SPG	BPG	PPG
2020–21	Delaware	15	10	25.3	.449	.286	**.818**	3.6	**1.8**	.4	.9	8.2
2021–22	Delaware	34	34	28.4	**.564**	**.405**	.657	5.1	1.3	.9	1.1	10.0
2022–23	Wake Forest	33	33	31.5	.489	.311	.773	6.0	1.2	**1.0**	.9	10.7
2023–24	Wake Forest	**35**	**35**	**32.5**	.526	.371	.781	**6.8**	1.5	.5	**1.5**	**13.5**
2024–25	Kentucky	**35**	29	24.0	.544	.324	.748	4.7	1.7	.7	.7	10.3
Career		152	141	28.7	.522	.340	.746	5.4	1.4	.7	1.0	10.8

== Personal life ==
Carr's younger brother Peter is a basketball player for the Boston University Terriers, while his sister Lizzie is a volleyball player for Kentucky.
