= 2026–27 NBL Ignite Cup =

Basketball tournament

- Logo of the league sponsored by 7-Eleven

Tournament information
- Location: Local NBL cities (regular season); Bruce, Canberra (semifinals and championship game)
- Date: 30 September 2026 – 21 February 2027
- Venues: Local NBL arenas (regular season); AIS Arena (semifinals and championship game)
- Teams: 10
- Purse: See prize money

The 2026–27 NBL Ignite Cup will be a multi-stage basketball tournament that will be played during the 2026–27 NBL season. It will be the second edition of the NBL Ignite Cup. The tournament will be hosted from 30 September 2026 to 21 February 2027, beginning in Round 4 with the New Zealand Breakers defeating the Cairns Taipans, 98–75 at Spark Arena.

The tournament expanded its finals format to four teams for semifinal games. The NBL's MVP Awards are also moving from Melbourne for the first time and will be hosted at the Great Hall in Canberra's Parliament House.

The tournament's semifinals and championship games will be played at the AIS Arena, Canberra.

All 10 teams participated, each playing four regular season games that counted towards the tournament's standings and the league standings.

== Prize money ==
The winning team will receive $315,000 AUD, while the runner-up receives $130,000 AUD. The semifinalist teams will each earn $45,000 AUD, with the remaining $15,000 AUD to be distributed through individual player awards.

== Ignite Cup games ==
30 September 2026	New Zealand Breakers	98–75	Cairns Taipans	Auckland
19:30	Scoring by quarter: 19–18, 23–17, 30–25, 26–15
ESPN/Sky Sport	Pts: Jackson-Cartwright 27; Rebs: Mennenga 9 Asts: Jackson-Cartwright 10	boxscore report	Pts: J.McVeigh 16; Rebs: Pinder 7 Asts: Lewis, J.McVeigh 3	Arena: Spark Arena; Attendance: 5,187

30 September 2026	Sydney Kings	93–78	Brisbane Bullets	Sydney
19:30	Scoring by quarter: 23–34, 20–10, 29–14, 21–20
ESPN	Pts: Davis 24; Rebs: Davis 8 Asts: Davis 7	boxscore report	Pts: Williams 19; Rebs: Williams 8 Asts: Velička 5	Arena: Sydney SuperDome; Attendance: 8,031

7 October 2026	Adelaide 36ers	91–96	Melbourne United	Adelaide
19:00	Scoring by quarter: 21–31, 17–25, 21–20, 32–20
ESPN	Pts: Cotton, Rakocevic 33; Rebs: Rakocevic 14; Asts: Cotton 10	boxscore report	Pts: Anthony 24; Rebs: Travers 7 Asts: Ili 6	Arena: Adelaide Entertainment Centre; Attendance: 10,047

14 October 2026	Sydney Kings	101–102	New Zealand Breakers	Canberra
19:30	Scoring by quarter: 29–31, 32–20, 12–24, 28–27
ESPN	Pts: Craig 28; Rebs: Carr 10; Asts: Davis 11	boxscore report	Pts: Mennenga 28; Rebs: Mennenga 13; Asts: Davison 14	Arena: AIS Arena; Attendance: 4,103

21 October 2026	Tasmania JackJumpers	106–85	Brisbane Bullets	Hobart
19:30	Scoring by quarter: 22–15, 34–29, 28–20, 22–21
ESPN	Pts: Bannan 22; Rebs: Bannan 9 Asts: Magnay 7	boxscore report	Pts: Mackinnon 21; Rebs: four players 4 Asts: Neto 6	Arena: Derwent Entertainment Centre; Attendance: 4,320

28 October 2026	Perth Wildcats	91–99	Sydney Kings	Perth
18:30	Scoring by quarter: 17–33, 25–26, 28–21, 21–19
ESPN	Pts: Knight 27; Rebs: Doolittle 15; Asts: Knight, Rillie 4	boxscore report	Pts: Craig 26; Rebs: Carr 8 Asts: Davis 9	Arena: Perth Arena; Attendance: 10,095

4 November 2026	Brisbane Bullets	109–104	Perth Wildcats	Brisbane
19:00	Scoring by quarter: 37–22, 26–21, 18–25, 28–36
ESPN	Pts: Harrison 16; Rebs: Hinton 8 Asts: Neto 8	boxscore report	Pts: Doolittle 24; Rebs: Doolittle 7 Asts: Doolittle 9	Arena: Nissan Arena; Attendance: 2,995

11 November 2026	S.E. Melbourne Phoenix	110–120	Illawarra Hawks	Melbourne
19:30	Scoring by quarter: 23–28, 31–43, 27–24, 29–25
ESPN	Pts: Schwartz 22; Rebs: Krebs 11; Asts: Sobey 9	boxscore report	Pts: Martin 27; Rebs: Hickey 9 Asts: Hickey 8	Arena: State Basketball Centre; Attendance: 1,838

18 November 2026	New Zealand Breakers	96–101	S.E. Melbourne Phoenix	Auckland
19:30	Scoring by quarter: 28–21, 27–23, 19–30, 22–27
ESPN/Sky Sport	Pts: Mays 20; Rebs: Mennenga 9 Asts: Mays 8	boxscore report	Pts: Sobey 30; Rebs: Morin 10; Asts: Sobey 9	Arena: Spark Arena; Attendance: 3,917

2 December 2026	Adelaide 36ers	vs.	S.E. Melbourne Phoenix	Adelaide
19:00	Scoring by quarter: –, –, –, –
ESPN				Arena: Adelaide Entertainment Centre

9 December 2026	Cairns Taipans	vs.	Adelaide 36ers	Cairns
18:30	Scoring by quarter: –, –, –, –
ESPN				Arena: TBC

16 December 2026	Perth Wildcats	vs.	Melbourne United	Perth
18:30	Scoring by quarter: –, –, –, –
ESPN				Arena: Perth Arena

23 December 2026	Melbourne United	vs.	Cairns Taipans	Melbourne
20:00	Scoring by quarter: –, –, –, –
ESPN				Arena: John Cain Arena

30 December 2026	Brisbane Bullets	vs.	Adelaide 36ers	Brisbane
18:30	Scoring by quarter: –, –, –, –
ESPN				Arena: Brisbane Entertainment Centre

6 January 2026	S.E. Melbourne Phoenix	vs.	Tasmania JackJumpers	Melbourne
17:30	Scoring by quarter: –, –, –, –
ESPN				Arena: State Basketball Centre

6 January 2027	Illawarra Hawks	vs.	Perth Wildcats	Wollongong
19:30	Scoring by quarter: –, –, –, –
ESPN				Arena: Wollongong Entertainment Centre

20 January 2027	Melbourne United	vs.	Tasmania JackJumpers	Bendigo
17:30	Scoring by quarter: –, –, –, –
ESPN				Arena: Bendigo Stadium

20 Janaury 2027	Illawarra Hawks	vs.	New Zealand Breakers	Wollongong
19:30	Scoring by quarter: –, –, –, –
ESPN				Arena: Wollongong Entertainment Centre

27 January 2027	Tasmania JackJumpers	vs.	Illawarra Hawks	Hobart
17:30	Scoring by quarter: –, –, –, –
ESPN				Arena: Derwent Entertainment Centre

27 January 2027	Cairns Taipans	vs.	Sydney Kings	Cairns
18:30	Scoring by quarter: –, –, –, –
ESPN				Arena: TBC

10 February 2027	Tasmania JackJumpers	vs.	Perth Wildcats	Hobart
19:30	Scoring by quarter: –, –, –, –
ESPN				Arena: Derwent Entertainment Centre

== Ladder ==
Pos	Team	Pld	W	L	PF	PA	PP	BP	Pts	Qualification
1	Sydney Kings	3	2	1	293	271	108.1	7	13	Semifinals
2	New Zealand Breakers	2	2	0	200	176	113.6	6	12	Semifinals
3	Tasmania JackJumpers	1	1	0	106	85	124.7	4	7	Semifinals
4	Brisbane Bullets	3	1	2	272	303	89.8	3	6	Semifinals
5	Illawarra Hawks	1	1	0	120	110	109.1	2	5	
6	Melbourne United	1	1	0	96	91	105.5	2	5	
7	Perth Wildcats	2	0	2	195	208	93.8	4	4	
8	Adelaide 36ers	1	0	1	91	96	94.8	2	2	
9	S.E. Melbourne Phoenix	1	0	1	110	120	91.7	2	2	
10	Cairns Taipans	1	0	1	75	98	76.5	0	0	

Updated to match(es) played on 11 November 2026. Source: Ignitecup.com.au
