= 2026–27 S.E. Melbourne Phoenix season =

Australian professional basketball season

- Head coach: (United States) Josh King
- Co-captains: (Australia) Jordan Hunter (Australia) Nathan Sobey
- Arena: John Cain Arena

NBL results
- Record: 5–10 (33.3%)
- Ladder: 9th
- Stats at NBL.com.au

Ignite Cup results
- Record: 1–1 (50%)
- Ladder: 4th
- All statistics correct as of 22 November 2026.

The 2026–27 S.E. Melbourne Phoenix season is the 8th season of the franchise in the National Basketball League (NBL), and their third under the leadership of head coach Josh King.

== Roster ==
Note: Flags indicate national team eligibility at FIBA-sanctioned events. Players may hold other non-FIBA nationalities not displayed.

S.E. Melbourne Phoenix roster
Players
Coaches

| Pos. | No. | Nat. | Name | Ht. | Wt. |
|---|---|---|---|---|---|
| C | 1 | (Australia) | Hunter, Jordan (C) | 2.13 m (7 ft 0 in) | 109 kg (240 lb) |
| G | 2 | (Australia) | Ryan, Pat (DP) | 1.98 m (6 ft 6 in) |
| G | 3 | (Australia) | Davidson, Sam | 1.90 m (6 ft 3 in) | 84 kg (185 lb) |
| G | 4 | (Australia) | Daniels, Dash (NS) | 1.96 m (6 ft 5 in) | 90 kg (198 lb) |
| G | 5 | (Australia) | Glover, Angus | 1.94 m (6 ft 4 in) | 90 kg (198 lb) |
| F | 7 | (Australia) | Aliir, Akech | 2.04 m (6 ft 8 in) | 102 kg (225 lb) |
| F | 8 | (Australia) | Biggar, Ellis (DP) | 2.08 m (6 ft 10 in) |
| F | 10 | (Australia) | Goodrick, Hunter (injured) | 2.01 m (6 ft 7 in) | 102 kg (225 lb) |
| G | 11 | (Australia) | Foster, Daniel | 1.97 m (6 ft 6 in) | 98 kg (216 lb) |
| F/C | 12 | (France) | Morin, Yannis (I) | 2.08 m (6 ft 10 in) | 95 kg (209 lb) |
| G | 13 | (Australia) | Krebs, Tanner | 1.98 m (6 ft 6 in) | 95 kg (209 lb) |
| G | 15 | (Australia) | Box, Kingsley | 1.96 m (6 ft 5 in) | 82 kg (181 lb) |
| G | 20 | (Australia) | Sobey, Nathan (C) | 1.90 m (6 ft 3 in) | 82 kg (181 lb) |
| F | 99 | (United States) | Schwartz, D'Shawn (I) | 2.01 m (6 ft 7 in) | 105 kg (231 lb) |

Head coach

- (United States) Josh King

Assistant coach(es)

- (Australia) Luke Brennan
- (Australia) Adam Gibson
- (United States) Dan Ryan

Legend

- (C) Team captain
- (DP) Development player
- (IN) Inactive
- (I) Import player
- (SRP) Special restricted player
- (NS) Next Star player
- Injured

- Roster
Updated: 14 November 2026

=== Depth chart ===
| Pos. | Starting 5 | Bench 1 | Development |
|---|---|---|---|
| PG | Angus Glover | Dash Daniels (NS) | Sam Davidson |
| SG | Nathan Sobey | Pat Ryan (DP) |
| SF | Tanner Krebs | Daniel Foster |
| PF | D'Shawn Schwartz (I) | Akech Aliir | Hunter Goodrick |
| C | Jordan Hunter | Yannis Morin (I) | Ellis Biggar (DP) |

== Standings ==
=== Ladder ===
| Pos | 2026–27 NBL season | | | | | | | | | | | |
| Pos | Team | Pld | W | L | PCT | Last 5 | Streak | Home | Away | PF | PA | PP |
|---|---|---|---|---|---|---|---|---|---|---|---|---|
| 1 | Tasmania JackJumpers | 14 | 10 | 4 | 71.43% | 4–1 | W2 | 6–2 | 4–2 | 1326 | 1257 | 105.49% |
| 2 | Sydney Kings | 14 | 9 | 5 | 64.29% | 3–2 | L1 | 6–2 | 3–3 | 1386 | 1281 | 108.20% |
| 3 | Cairns Taipans | 16 | 10 | 6 | 62.50% | 4–1 | W4 | 5–2 | 5–4 | 1486 | 1525 | 97.44% |
| 4 | Melbourne United | 15 | 9 | 6 | 60.00% | 4–1 | W2 | 5–3 | 4–3 | 1470 | 1378 | 106.68% |
| 5 | Adelaide 36ers | 14 | 7 | 7 | 50.00% | 3–2 | L1 | 3–3 | 4–4 | 1305 | 1305 | 100.00% |
| 6 | Perth Wildcats | 14 | 7 | 7 | 50.00% | 2–3 | L1 | 7–4 | 0–3 | 1334 | 1369 | 97.44% |
| 7 | Brisbane Bullets | 15 | 7 | 8 | 46.67% | 2–3 | W1 | 5–3 | 2–5 | 1436 | 1493 | 96.18% |
| 8 | Illawarra Hawks | 17 | 6 | 11 | 35.29% | 2–3 | L1 | 2–4 | 4–7 | 1647 | 1763 | 93.42% |
| 9 | S.E. Melbourne Phoenix | 15 | 5 | 10 | 33.33% | 1–4 | L1 | 3–5 | 2–5 | 1466 | 1466 | 100.00% |
| 10 | New Zealand Breakers | 16 | 5 | 11 | 31.25% | 1–4 | L3 | 3–2 | 2–9 | 1456 | 1475 | 98.71% |

Updated to match(es) played on 22 November 2026. Source: NBL.com.au

The NBL tie-breaker system as outlined in the NBL Rules and Regulations states that in the case of an identical win–loss record, the overall points percentage will determine order of seeding.

=== Ladder progression ===
| Leader and qualification to semifinals |
| Qualification to semifinals |
| Qualification to play-in |
| Last place |

2026–27 NBL season
| Team ╲ Round | 1 | 2 | 3 | 4 | 5 | 6 | 7 | 8 | 9 | 10 | 11 | 12 | 13 | 14 | 15 | 16 | 17 | 18 | 19 | 20 | 21 |
|---|---|---|---|---|---|---|---|---|---|---|---|---|---|---|---|---|---|---|---|---|---|
| Adelaide 36ers | 4 | 3 | 7 | 7 | 6 | 9 | 7 | 5 | 5 | 5 | | | | | | | | | | | |
| Brisbane Bullets | 3 | 2 | 5 | 8 | 5 | 5 | 6 | 6 | 7 | 7 | | | | | | | | | | | |
| Cairns Taipans | 9 | 9 | 8 | 4 | 7 | 4 | 5 | 4 | 4 | 3 | | | | | | | | | | | |
| Illawarra Hawks | 8 | 10 | 10 | 10 | 10 | 10 | 10 | 10 | 9 | 8 | | | | | | | | | | | |
| Melbourne United | 7 | 5 | 9 | 6 | 8 | 7 | 4 | 3 | 3 | 4 | | | | | | | | | | | |
| New Zealand Breakers | 6 | 7 | 4 | 5 | 4 | 8 | 9 | 9 | 8 | 10 | | | | | | | | | | | |
| Perth Wildcats | 10 | 4 | 3 | 2 | 3 | 2 | 3 | 7 | 6 | 6 | | | | | | | | | | | |
| S.E. Melbourne Phoenix | 5 | 8 | 6 | 9 | 9 | 6 | 8 | 8 | 10 | 9 | | | | | | | | | | | |
| Sydney Kings | 1 | 1 | 1 | 3 | 2 | 3 | 1 | 1 | 1 | 2 | | | | | | | | | | | |
| Tasmania JackJumpers | 2 | 6 | 2 | 1 | 1 | 1 | 2 | 2 | 2 | 1 | | | | | | | | | | | |

Updated to match(es) played on 22 November 2026. Source: NBL.com.au

== Game log ==
=== Pre-season ===
The 2026 NBL Blitz will run from 2–6 September 2026 with games being played at the Bendigo Stadium, Bendigo.

2026 NBL Blitz game log
Total: 2–0 (Home: 1–0; Road: 1–0)
September: 2–0 (Home: 1–0; Road: 1–0)

| Game | Date | Team | Score | High points | High rebounds | High assists | Location Attendance | Record |
|---|---|---|---|---|---|---|---|---|
| 1 | 2 September | @ Sydney | W 84–101 | Akech Aliir (14) | Aliir, Schwartz (8) | Nathan Sobey (7) | Bendigo Stadium n/a | 1–0 |
| 2 | 5 September | Brisbane | W 113–105 | D'Shawn Schwartz (17) | Angus Glover (5) | Daniels, Sobey (4) | Bendigo Stadium n/a | 2–0 |

=== Regular season ===
The regular season will begin on 19 September 2026. It will consist of 165 games (33 games each) spread across 21 rounds, with the final game being played on 14 February 2027.

2026–27 game log
Total: 5–9 (Home: 3–4; Road: 2–5)
September: 1–2 (Home: 0–1; Road: 1–1)

| Game | Date | Team | Score | High points | High rebounds | High assists | Location Attendance | Record |
|---|---|---|---|---|---|---|---|---|
| 1 | 19 September | @ Perth | W 79–100 | Tanner Krebs (25) | Dash Daniels (12) | Skylar Mays (6) | Perth Arena; 10,670 | 1–0 |
| 2 | 21 September | @ Tasmania | L 96–91 | Angus Glover (21) | Goodrick, Mays (6) | Dash Daniels (4) | Derwent Entertainment Centre; 4,340 | 1–1 |
| 3 | 24 September | Melbourne | L 61–86 | Aliir, Mays (10) | Hunter, Schwartz (7) | Skylar Mays (5) | John Cain Arena; 10,175 | 1–2 |

October: 3–3 (Home: 3–1; Road: 0–2)

| Game | Date | Team | Score | High points | High rebounds | High assists | Location Attendance | Record |
|---|---|---|---|---|---|---|---|---|
| 4 | 2 October | @ Perth | L 92–88 | Skylar Mays (17) | Dash Daniels (7) | Nathan Sobey (8) | Perth Arena; 11,831 | 1–3 |
| 5 | 4 October | Illawarra | W 113–96 | Nathan Sobey (24) | Dash Daniels (8) | Daniels, Sobey (6) | John Cain Arena; 6,623 | 2–3 |
| 6 | 10 October | Melbourne | L 99–104 | Nathan Sobey (24) | Tanner Krebs (6) | Skylar Mays (7) | John Cain Arena; 9,007 | 2–4 |
| 7 | 15 October | @ Brisbane | L 115–105 | Angus Glover (27) | Tanner Krebs (8) | Skylar Mays (6) | Brisbane Entertainment Centre; 3,598 | 2–5 |
| 8 | 17 October | Cairns | W 115–83 | Nathan Sobey (29) | Jordan Hunter (11) | Nathan Sobey (6) | John Cain Arena; 5,661 | 3–5 |
| 9 | 24 October | Adelaide | W 108–94 | Glover, Schwartz (20) | Yannis Morin (8) | Nathan Sobey (6) | John Cain Arena; 5,602 | 4–5 |

November: 1–4 (Home: 0–2; Road: 1–2)

| Game | Date | Team | Score | High points | High rebounds | High assists | Location Attendance | Record |
|---|---|---|---|---|---|---|---|---|
| 10 | 1 November | Tasmania | L 89–98 | D'Shawn Schwartz (27) | Schwartz, Sobey (5) | Dash Daniels (4) | John Cain Arena; 9,501 | 4–6 |
| 11 | 8 November | @ Sydney | L 110–99 | Nathan Sobey (33) | Yannis Morin (12) | Morin, Sobey (4) | Sydney SuperDome; 11,123 | 4–7 |
| 12 | 11 November | Illawarra | L 110–120 | D'Shawn Schwartz (22) | Tanner Krebs (11) | Nathan Sobey (9) | State Basketball Centre; 1,838 | 4–8 |
| 13 | 14 November | @ Melbourne | L 102–95 | Nathan Sobey (23) | Morin, Sobey (6) | Nathan Sobey (8) | John Cain Arena; 10,175 | 4–9 |
| 14 | 18 November | @ New Zealand | W 96–101 | Nathan Sobey (30) | Yannis Morin (10) | Nathan Sobey (9) | Spark Arena; 3,917 | 5–10 |
| 15 | 22 November | Cairns | | | | | John Cain Arena | – |

December: 0–0 (Home: 0–0; Road: 0–0)

| Game | Date | Team | Score | High points | High rebounds | High assists | Location Attendance | Record |
|---|---|---|---|---|---|---|---|---|
| 16 | | | | | | | | – |
| 17 | | | | | | | | – |
| 18 | | | | | | | | – |
| 19 | | | | | | | | – |
| 20 | | | | | | | | – |
| 21 | | | | | | | | – |

January: 0–0 (Home: 0–0; Road: 0–0)

| Game | Date | Team | Score | High points | High rebounds | High assists | Location Attendance | Record |
|---|---|---|---|---|---|---|---|---|
| 22 | | | | | | | | – |
| 23 | | | | | | | | – |
| 24 | | | | | | | | – |
| 25 | | | | | | | | – |
| 26 | | | | | | | | – |
| 27 | | | | | | | | – |
| 28 | | | | | | | | – |
| 29 | | | | | | | | – |

February: 0–0 (Home: 0–0; Road: 0–0)

| Game | Date | Team | Score | High points | High rebounds | High assists | Location Attendance | Record |
|---|---|---|---|---|---|---|---|---|
| 30 | | | | | | | | – |
| 31 | | | | | | | | – |
| 32 | | | | | | | | – |
| 33 | | | | | | | | – |

2026–27 season schedule

=== NBL Ignite Cup ===
The NBL introduced a new finals format for the 2026–27 Ignite Cup, which will include four teams and semifinals games.

| Pos | Team | Pld | W | L | PF | PA | PP | BP | Pts | Qualification |
|---|---|---|---|---|---|---|---|---|---|---|
| 1 | New Zealand Breakers | 3 | 2 | 1 | 296 | 277 | 106.9 | 8 | 14 | Semifinals |
| 2 | Sydney Kings | 3 | 2 | 1 | 293 | 271 | 108.1 | 7 | 13 | Semifinals |
| 3 | Tasmania JackJumpers | 1 | 1 | 0 | 106 | 85 | 124.7 | 4 | 7 | Semifinals |
| 4 | S.E. Melbourne Phoenix | 2 | 1 | 1 | 211 | 216 | 97.7 | 4 | 7 | Semifinals |
| 5 | Brisbane Bullets | 3 | 1 | 2 | 272 | 303 | 89.8 | 3 | 6 | |
| 6 | Illawarra Hawks | 1 | 1 | 0 | 120 | 110 | 109.1 | 2 | 5 | |
| 7 | Melbourne United | 1 | 1 | 0 | 96 | 91 | 105.5 | 2 | 5 | |
| 8 | Perth Wildcats | 2 | 0 | 2 | 195 | 208 | 93.8 | 4 | 4 | |
| 9 | Adelaide 36ers | 1 | 0 | 1 | 91 | 96 | 94.8 | 2 | 2 | |
| 10 | Cairns Taipans | 1 | 0 | 1 | 75 | 98 | 76.5 | 0 | 0 | |

Updated to match(es) played on 18 November 2026. Source: Ignitecup.com.au

== Transactions ==
Free agency began on 17 April 2026.

== Awards ==
=== Club awards ===
- Club MVP:
- Fan Voted Player of the Year:
- The Locker Room Award:
- Defensive Player of the Year:
- Staff Member of the Year:
- Heartland Crew Member of the Year:
- Life Member Award:
- Community Impact Award:

== See also ==
- 2026–27 NBL season
- South East Melbourne Phoenix
