= 2026–27 Brisbane Bullets season =

Australian professional basketball season

- Head coach: (United States) Will Weaver
- Captain: (Australia) Mitch Norton
- Arena: Brisbane Entertainment Centre

NBL results
- Record: 7–8 (46.7%)
- Ladder: 7th
- Stats at NBL.com.au

Ignite Cup results
- Record: 1–2 (33.3%)
- Ladder: 5th
- All statistics correct as of 22 November 2026.

The 2026–27 Brisbane Bullets season is the 41st season of the franchise in the National Basketball League (NBL).

== Roster ==
Note: Flags indicate national team eligibility at FIBA-sanctioned events. Players may hold other non-FIBA nationalities not displayed.

Brisbane Bullets roster
Players
Coaches

Pos.	No.	Nat.	Name	Ht.	Wt.
G	0	(New Zealand)	Murray, Taine	1.96 m (6 ft 5 in)	93 kg (205 lb)
G	1	(Lithuania)	Velička, Arnas (I)	1.95 m (6 ft 5 in)	92 kg (203 lb)
F	2	(United States)	Williams, Jaylin (I)	2.03 m (6 ft 8 in)	111 kg (245 lb)
G	3	(Australia)	Mackinnon, Max	1.98 m (6 ft 6 in)	96 kg (212 lb)
G/F	4	(United States)	Hinton, Nate (I)	1.96 m (6 ft 5 in)	95 kg (209 lb)
G	5	(Australia)	Duach, Josh (DP)	1.96 m (6 ft 5 in)
F	6	(Australia)	Woodhill, Archie (NRP)	2.06 m (6 ft 9 in)	95 kg (209 lb)
G	8	(Australia)	Norton, Mitch (C)	1.84 m (6 ft 0 in)	90 kg (198 lb)
F	9	(South Sudan)	Mag, Mawot (IRP)	2.01 m (6 ft 7 in)	97 kg (214 lb)
F	10	(Australia)	McRae, Billy (DP)	1.98 m (6 ft 6 in)
F	11	(South Sudan)	Mayen, Lat	2.06 m (6 ft 9 in)	92 kg (203 lb)
G	13	(Australia)	Bruton, Rio (DP)	1.96 m (6 ft 5 in)
F	14	(Australia)	Rouhliadeff, Harry	2.06 m (6 ft 9 in)	104 kg (229 lb)
F	15	(Australia)	Holt, Jacob	2.08 m (6 ft 10 in)	113 kg (249 lb)
C	24	(New Zealand)	Harrison, Tyrell	2.14 m (7 ft 0 in)	115 kg (254 lb)
G	26	(Australia)	McDaniel, Sam	1.98 m (6 ft 6 in)	102 kg (225 lb)

Head coach

- (United States) Will Weaver

Assistant coach(es)

- (United States) Alex Grossman
- (Australia) Markus Klusemann
- (Finland) Hanno Möttölä

Legend

- (C) Team captain
- (DP) Development player
- (IN) Inactive
- (I) Import player
- (TP) Training player
- (NRP) Nominated replacement player
- (NS) Next Star player
- Injured

- Roster
Updated: 21 November 2026

=== Depth chart ===
Pos.	Starting 5	Bench 1	Development	Injured
PG	Raul Neto	Mitch Norton		Arnas Velička (injured)
SG	Max Mackinnon	Taine Murray
SF	Nate Hinton	Lat Mayen		Sam McDaniel (injured)
PF	Jaylin Williams	Mawot Mag	Harry Rouhliadeff
C	Tyrell Harrison	Archie Woodhill		Jacob Holt (injured)

== Standings ==
=== Ladder ===
Pos	2026–27 NBL season											
Pos	Team	Pld	W	L	PCT	Last 5	Streak	Home	Away	PF	PA	PP
1	Tasmania JackJumpers	14	10	4	71.43%	4–1	W2	6–2	4–2	1326	1257	105.49%
2	Sydney Kings	14	9	5	64.29%	3–2	L1	6–2	3–3	1386	1281	108.20%
3	Cairns Taipans	16	10	6	62.50%	4–1	W4	5–2	5–4	1486	1525	97.44%
4	Melbourne United	15	9	6	60.00%	4–1	W2	5–3	4–3	1470	1378	106.68%
5	Adelaide 36ers	14	7	7	50.00%	3–2	L1	3–3	4–4	1305	1305	100.00%
6	Perth Wildcats	14	7	7	50.00%	2–3	L1	7–4	0–3	1334	1369	97.44%
7	Brisbane Bullets	15	7	8	46.67%	2–3	W1	5–3	2–5	1436	1493	96.18%
8	Illawarra Hawks	17	6	11	35.29%	2–3	L1	2–4	4–7	1647	1763	93.42%
9	S.E. Melbourne Phoenix	15	5	10	33.33%	1–4	L1	3–5	2–5	1466	1466	100.00%
10	New Zealand Breakers	16	5	11	31.25%	1–4	L3	3–2	2–9	1456	1475	98.71%

Updated to match(es) played on 22 November 2026. Source: NBL.com.au

The NBL tie-breaker system as outlined in the NBL Rules and Regulations states that in the case of an identical win–loss record, the overall points percentage will determine order of seeding.

=== Ladder progression ===
Leader and qualification to semifinals
Qualification to semifinals
Qualification to play-in
Last place

2026–27 NBL season
Team ╲ Round	1	2	3	4	5	6	7	8	9	10	11	12	13	14	15	16	17	18	19	20	21
Adelaide 36ers	4	3	7	7	6	9	7	5	5	5											
Brisbane Bullets	3	2	5	8	5	5	6	6	7	7											
Cairns Taipans	9	9	8	4	7	4	5	4	4	3											
Illawarra Hawks	8	10	10	10	10	10	10	10	9	8											
Melbourne United	7	5	9	6	8	7	4	3	3	4											
New Zealand Breakers	6	7	4	5	4	8	9	9	8	10											
Perth Wildcats	10	4	3	2	3	2	3	7	6	6											
S.E. Melbourne Phoenix	5	8	6	9	9	6	8	8	10	9											
Sydney Kings	1	1	1	3	2	3	1	1	1	2											
Tasmania JackJumpers	2	6	2	1	1	1	2	2	2	1											

Updated to match(es) played on 22 November 2026. Source: NBL.com.au

== Game log ==
=== Pre-season ===
The 2026 NBL Blitz will run from 2–6 September 2026 with games being played at the Bendigo Stadium, Bendigo.

2026 NBL Blitz game log
Total: 1–1 (Home: 1–0; Road: 0–1)
September: 1–1 (Home: 1–0; Road: 0–1)

Game	Date	Team	Score	High points	High rebounds	High assists	Location Attendance	Record
1	3 September	Tasmania	W 112–91	Tyrell Harrison (28)	Tyrell Harrison (10)	Arnas Velička (13)	Bendigo Stadium n/a	1–0
2	5 September	@ S.E. Melbourne	L 113–105	Arnas Velička (24)	Tyrell Harrison (8)	Arnas Velička (7)	Bendigo Stadium n/a	1–1

=== Regular season ===
The regular season will begin on 19 September 2026. It will consist of 165 games (33 games each) spread across 21 rounds, with the final game being played on 14 February 2027.

2026–27 game log
Total: 6–8 (Home: 4–3; Road: 2–5)
September: 2–1 (Home: 2–0; Road: 0–1)

Game	Date	Team	Score	High points	High rebounds	High assists	Location Attendance	Record
1	22 September	New Zealand	W 88–85	Arnas Velička (23)	Nate Hinton (8)	Arnas Velička (14)	Pat Rafter Arena; 5,285	1–0
2	25 September	Illawarra	W 103–95	Max Mackinnon (31)	Max Mackinnon (12)	Arnas Velička (11)	Brisbane Entertainment Centre; 4,025	2–0
3	30 September	@ Sydney	L 93–78	Jaylin Williams (19)	Jaylin Williams (8)	Arnas Velička (5)	Sydney SuperDome; 8,031	2–1

October: 2–4 (Home: 1–2; Road: 1–2)

Game	Date	Team	Score	High points	High rebounds	High assists	Location Attendance	Record
4	3 October	Tasmania	L 99–109 (OT)	Tyrell Harrison (24)	Tyrell Harrison (12)	Arnas Velička (13)	Brisbane Entertainment Centre; 5,556	2–2
5	8 October	@ Cairns	L 97–91	Nate Hinton (30)	Tyrell Harrison (18)	Arnas Velička (8)	Cairns Convention Centre; 4,254	2–3
6	15 October	S.E. Melbourne	W 115–105	Max Mackinnon (24)	Max Mackinnon (8)	Mitch Norton (9)	Brisbane Entertainment Centre; 3,598	3–3
7	21 October	@ Tasmania	L 106–85	Max Mackinnon (21)	four players (4)	Raul Neto (6)	Derwent Entertainment Centre; 4,320	3–4
8	24 October	@ Illawarra	W 81–98	Nate Hinton (21)	Tyrell Harrison (8)	Nate Hinton (6)	Wollongong Entertainment Centre; 3,948	4–4
9	29 October	Cairns	L 85–107	Taine Murray (20)	Harrison, Hinton (6)	Harrison, Neto (4)	Brisbane Entertainment Centre; 2,906	4–5

November: 2–3 (Home: 1–1; Road: 1–2)

Game	Date	Team	Score	High points	High rebounds	High assists	Location Attendance	Record
10	1 November	@ Adelaide	W 89–96	Tyrell Harrison (24)	Tyrell Harrison (10)	Mitch Norton (7)	Adelaide Entertainment Centre; 10,039	5–5
11	4 November	Perth	W 109–104	Tyrell Harrison (16)	Nate Hinton (8)	Raul Neto (8)	Nissan Arena; 2,995	6–5
12	7 November	@ Melbourne	L 120–92	Lat Mayen (15)	Tyrell Harrison (5)	Raul Neto (6)	John Cain Arena; 7,215	6–6
13	13 November	@ New Zealand	L 94–90 (OT)	Tyrell Harrison (22)	Nate Hinton (14)	Raul Neto (10)	Spark Arena; 3,723	6–7
14	15 November	Tasmania	L 92–104	Nate Hinton (27)	Lat Mayen (8)	Nate Hinton (4)	Brisbane Entertainment Centre; 4,669	6–8
15	22 November	@ Sydney					Sydney SuperDome	–

December: 0–0 (Home: 0–0; Road: 0–0)

Game	Date	Team	Score	High points	High rebounds	High assists	Location Attendance	Record
16								–
17								–
18								–
19								–
20								–
21								–
22								–

January: 0–0 (Home: 0–0; Road: 0–0)

Game	Date	Team	Score	High points	High rebounds	High assists	Location Attendance	Record
23								–
24								–
25								–
26								–
27								–
28								–
29								–

February: 0–0 (Home: 0–0; Road: 0–0)

Game	Date	Team	Score	High points	High rebounds	High assists	Location Attendance	Record
30								–
31								–
32								–
33								–

2026–27 season schedule

=== NBL Ignite Cup ===
The NBL introduced a new finals format for the 2026–27 Ignite Cup, which will include four teams and semifinals games.

Pos	Team	Pld	W	L	PF	PA	PP	BP	Pts	Qualification
1	New Zealand Breakers	3	2	1	296	277	106.9	8	14	Semifinals
2	Sydney Kings	3	2	1	293	271	108.1	7	13	Semifinals
3	Tasmania JackJumpers	1	1	0	106	85	124.7	4	7	Semifinals
4	S.E. Melbourne Phoenix	2	1	1	211	216	97.7	4	7	Semifinals
5	Brisbane Bullets	3	1	2	272	303	89.8	3	6	
6	Illawarra Hawks	1	1	0	120	110	109.1	2	5	
7	Melbourne United	1	1	0	96	91	105.5	2	5	
8	Perth Wildcats	2	0	2	195	208	93.8	4	4	
9	Adelaide 36ers	1	0	1	91	96	94.8	2	2	
10	Cairns Taipans	1	0	1	75	98	76.5	0	0	

Updated to match(es) played on 18 November 2026. Source: Ignitecup.com.au

== Transactions ==
Free agency began on 17 April 2026.

== Awards ==
=== Club awards ===
- Club MVP:
- Player of the Year:
- Defensive Player of the Year:
- Youth Player of the Year:
- Narelle Kelly Award:
- Volunteer of the Year:

== See also ==
- 2026–27 NBL season
- Brisbane Bullets
