= 2026–27 Melbourne United season =

Australian professional basketball season

- Head coach: (Australia) Jacob Chance
- Captain: (Australia) Chris Goulding
- Arena: John Cain Arena

NBL results
- Record: 9–6 (60%)
- Ladder: 3rd
- Stats at NBL.com.au

Ignite Cup results
- Record: 1–0 (100.0%)
- Ladder: 7th
- All statistics correct as of 22 November 2026.

The 2026–27 Melbourne United season is the 44th season of the franchise in the National Basketball League (NBL), and their 13th under the banner of Melbourne United.

== Roster ==
Note: Flags indicate national team eligibility at FIBA-sanctioned events. Players may hold other non-FIBA nationalities not displayed.

Melbourne United roster
Players
Coaches

Pos.	No.	Nat.	Name	Ht.	Wt.
F/C	2	(United States)	Oduro, Josh (I)	2.06 m (6 ft 9 in)	109 kg (240 lb)
G	3	(United States)	Anthony, Cole (I)	1.88 m (6 ft 2 in)	84 kg (185 lb)
G	5	(Australia)	Shelley, Austin (NRP)	1.90 m (6 ft 3 in)
G/F	7	(Australia)	Ingles, Joe	2.03 m (6 ft 8 in)	100 kg (220 lb)
F	9	(South Sudan)	Machar, Malith	2.04 m (6 ft 8 in)	92 kg (203 lb)
G	11	(Australia)	D'Angelo, Christian (DP)	1.91 m (6 ft 3 in)	85 kg (187 lb)
G	12	(Australia)	Wilson, Tom	1.94 m (6 ft 4 in)	82 kg (181 lb)
G	13	(Australia)	Macdonald, Sean (injured) (NRP)	1.88 m (6 ft 2 in)	86 kg (190 lb)
F	15	(Australia)	Bowen, Kyle	2.04 m (6 ft 8 in)	101 kg (223 lb)
C	16	(Australia)	Neilson, Harry (TP)	2.10 m (6 ft 11 in)
F	18	(Australia)	Krslovic, Fabijan	2.03 m (6 ft 8 in)	106 kg (234 lb)
F	21	(New Zealand)	Waardenburg, Sam	2.08 m (6 ft 10 in)	100 kg (220 lb)
G/F	23	(Australia)	Travers, Luke	2.01 m (6 ft 7 in)	101 kg (223 lb)
G	24	(Australia)	Hynes, Will (DP)	1.90 m (6 ft 3 in)
G/F	30	(Australia)	Fa'ale, Jai (DP)	1.95 m (6 ft 5 in)
G	43	(Australia)	Goulding, Chris (injured) (C)	1.92 m (6 ft 4 in)	92 kg (203 lb)
F	50	(Australia)	Bradtke, Jensen (DP)	2.08 m (6 ft 10 in)	100 kg (220 lb)
G	51	(New Zealand)	Ili, Shea	1.84 m (6 ft 0 in)	88 kg (194 lb)

Head coach

- (Australia) Jacob Chance

Assistant coach(es)

- (Australia) David Barlow
- (Australia) Rhys Carter
- (Australia) Keegan Crawford

Team manager

- (Australia) Stephan Semerci

Legend

- (C) Team captain
- (DP) Development player
- (IN) Inactive
- (I) Import player
- (TP) Training player
- (NRP) Nominated replacement player
- (NS) Next Star player
- Injured

- Roster
Updated: 13 October 2026

=== Depth chart ===
Pos.	Starting 5	Bench 1	Bench 2
PG		Shea Ili
SG	Chris Goulding		Tom Wilson
SF		Malith Machar
PF		Kyle Bowen
C		Fabijan Krslovic

== Standings ==
=== Ladder ===
Pos	2026–27 NBL season											
Pos	Team	Pld	W	L	PCT	Last 5	Streak	Home	Away	PF	PA	PP
1	Tasmania JackJumpers	14	10	4	71.43%	4–1	W2	6–2	4–2	1326	1257	105.49%
2	Sydney Kings	14	9	5	64.29%	3–2	L1	6–2	3–3	1386	1281	108.20%
3	Cairns Taipans	16	10	6	62.50%	4–1	W4	5–2	5–4	1486	1525	97.44%
4	Melbourne United	15	9	6	60.00%	4–1	W2	5–3	4–3	1470	1378	106.68%
5	Adelaide 36ers	14	7	7	50.00%	3–2	L1	3–3	4–4	1305	1305	100.00%
6	Perth Wildcats	14	7	7	50.00%	2–3	L1	7–4	0–3	1334	1369	97.44%
7	Brisbane Bullets	15	7	8	46.67%	2–3	W1	5–3	2–5	1436	1493	96.18%
8	Illawarra Hawks	17	6	11	35.29%	2–3	L1	2–4	4–7	1647	1763	93.42%
9	S.E. Melbourne Phoenix	15	5	10	33.33%	1–4	L1	3–5	2–5	1466	1466	100.00%
10	New Zealand Breakers	16	5	11	31.25%	1–4	L3	3–2	2–9	1456	1475	98.71%

Updated to match(es) played on 22 November 2026. Source: NBL.com.au

The NBL tie-breaker system as outlined in the NBL Rules and Regulations states that in the case of an identical win–loss record, the overall points percentage will determine order of seeding.

=== Ladder progression ===
Leader and qualification to semifinals
Qualification to semifinals
Qualification to play-in
Last place

2026–27 NBL season
Team ╲ Round	1	2	3	4	5	6	7	8	9	10	11	12	13	14	15	16	17	18	19	20	21
Adelaide 36ers	4	3	7	7	6	9	7	5	5	5											
Brisbane Bullets	3	2	5	8	5	5	6	6	7	7											
Cairns Taipans	9	9	8	4	7	4	5	4	4	3											
Illawarra Hawks	8	10	10	10	10	10	10	10	9	8											
Melbourne United	7	5	9	6	8	7	4	3	3	4											
New Zealand Breakers	6	7	4	5	4	8	9	9	8	10											
Perth Wildcats	10	4	3	2	3	2	3	7	6	6											
S.E. Melbourne Phoenix	5	8	6	9	9	6	8	8	10	9											
Sydney Kings	1	1	1	3	2	3	1	1	1	2											
Tasmania JackJumpers	2	6	2	1	1	1	2	2	2	1											

Updated to match(es) played on 22 November 2026. Source: NBL.com.au

== Game log ==
=== Pre-season ===
The 2026 NBL Blitz will run from 2–6 September 2026 with games being played at the Bendigo Stadium, Bendigo.

2026 NBL Blitz game log
Total: 1–1 (Home: 1–0; Road: 1–0)
September: 1–1 (Home: 1–1; Road: 0–0)

Game	Date	Team	Score	High points	High rebounds	High assists	Location Attendance	Record
1	4 September	@ Perth	W 82–97	Luke Travers (23)	Josh Oduro (10)	three players (3)	Bendigo Stadium n/a	1–0
2	6 September	Illawarra	W 103–98	Josh Oduro (22)	three players (10)	Kyle Bowen (6)	Bendigo Stadium n/a	2–0

=== Regular season ===
The regular season will begin on 19 September 2026. It will consist of 165 games (33 games each) spread across 21 rounds, with the final game being played on 14 February 2027.

2026–27 game log
Total: 8–6 (Home: 4–3; Road: 4–3)
September: 1–1 (Home: 0–1; Road: 1–0)

Game	Date	Team	Score	High points	High rebounds	High assists	Location Attendance	Record
1	19 September	Adelaide	L 95–97	Cole Anthony (30)	Josh Oduro (6)	Joe Ingles (7)	John Cain Arena; 9,278	0–1
2	24 September	@ S.E. Melbourne	W 61–86	Josh Oduro (21)	Luke Travers (10)	Cole Anthony (6)	John Cain Arena; 10,175	1–1

October: 4–4 (Home: 1–2; Road: 3–2)

Game	Date	Team	Score	High points	High rebounds	High assists	Location Attendance	Record
3	1 October	@ Tasmania	L 84–82	Josh Oduro (22)	Oduro, Waardenburg (8)	Luke Travers (6)	Derwent Entertainment Centre; 4,340	1–2
4	3 October	Cairns	L 95–107	Cole Anthony (40)	Josh Oduro (11)	Luke Travers (3)	John Cain Arena; 8,684	1–3
5	7 October	@ Adelaide	W 91–96	Cole Anthony (24)	Luke Travers (7)	Shea Ili (6)	Adelaide Entertainment Centre; 10,047	2–3
6	10 October	@ S.E. Melbourne	W 99–104	Luke Travers (24)	Josh Oduro (10)	Cole Anthony (7)	John Cain Arena; 9,007	3–3
7	18 October	Illawarra	L 89–91	Cole Anthony (24)	three players (7)	Anthony, Ingles (5)	John Cain Arena; 9,679	3–4
8	23 October	@ Perth	L 103–102	Luke Travers (26)	Luke Travers (9)	Joe Ingles (8)	Perth Arena; 12,808	3–5
9	25 October	Sydney	W 105–95	Cole Anthony (30)	Anthony, Waardenburg (6)	Cole Anthony (9)	John Cain Arena; 8,523	4–5
10	31 October	@ Cairns	W 97–113	Oduro (26)	Anthony, Travers (7)	three players (4)	Cairns Convention Centre; 4,028	5–5

November: 3–1 (Home: 3–0; Road: 0–1)

Game	Date	Team	Score	High points	High rebounds	High assists	Location Attendance	Record
11	2 November	New Zealand	W 94–74	Cole Anthony (21)	Josh Oduro (19)	Luke Travers (6)	John Cain Arena; 10,017	6–5
12	7 November	Brisbane	W 120–92	Cole Anthony (32)	Josh Oduro (14)	Cole Anthony (6)	John Cain Arena; 7,215	7–5
13	12 November	@ Adelaide	L 101–93	Cole Anthony (27)	Luke Travers (8)	Joe Ingles (7)	Adelaide Entertainment Centre; 10,046	7–6
14	14 November	S.E. Melbourne	W 102–95	Cole Anthony (39)	Sam Waardenburg (10)	Joe Ingles (5)	John Cain Arena; 10,175	8–6
15	21 November	New Zealand					John Cain Arena	–

December: 0–0 (Home: 0–0; Road: 0–0)

Game	Date	Team	Score	High points	High rebounds	High assists	Location Attendance	Record
16								–
17								–
18								–
19								–
20								–
21								–
22								–

January: 0–0 (Home: 0–0; Road: 0–0)

Game	Date	Team	Score	High points	High rebounds	High assists	Location Attendance	Record
23								–
24								–
25								–
26								–
27								–
28								–
29								–

February: 0–0 (Home: 0–0; Road: 0–0)

Game	Date	Team	Score	High points	High rebounds	High assists	Location Attendance	Record
30								–
31								–
32								–
33								–

2026–27 season schedule

=== NBL Ignite Cup ===
The NBL introduced a new finals format for the 2026–27 Ignite Cup, which will include four teams and semifinals games.

Pos	Team	Pld	W	L	PF	PA	PP	BP	Pts	Qualification
1	New Zealand Breakers	3	2	1	296	277	106.9	8	14	Semifinals
2	Sydney Kings	3	2	1	293	271	108.1	7	13	Semifinals
3	Tasmania JackJumpers	1	1	0	106	85	124.7	4	7	Semifinals
4	S.E. Melbourne Phoenix	2	1	1	211	216	97.7	4	7	Semifinals
5	Brisbane Bullets	3	1	2	272	303	89.8	3	6	
6	Illawarra Hawks	1	1	0	120	110	109.1	2	5	
7	Melbourne United	1	1	0	96	91	105.5	2	5	
8	Perth Wildcats	2	0	2	195	208	93.8	4	4	
9	Adelaide 36ers	1	0	1	91	96	94.8	2	2	
10	Cairns Taipans	1	0	1	75	98	76.5	0	0	

Updated to match(es) played on 18 November 2026. Source: Ignitecup.com.au

== Transactions ==
Free agency began on 17 April 2026.

== Awards ==
=== Club awards ===
- Club MVP:
- Defensive Player:
- SHARE Award:
- Melbourne United Belt:
- Bringing the Blue Podcast MVP:
- Vince Crivelli Club Person of the Year:

== See also ==
- 2026–27 NBL season
- Melbourne United
