= 2026–27 Perth Wildcats season =

Australian professional basketball season

- Head coach: (Australia) John Rillie
- Captain: (Australia) Jesse Wagstaff
- Arena: Perth Arena

NBL results
- Record: 7–7 (50%)
- Ladder: 6th
- Stats at NBL.com.au

Ignite Cup results
- Record: 0–2 (0%)
- Ladder: 8th
- All statistics correct as of 22 November 2026.

The 2026–27 Perth Wildcats season is the 46th season of the franchise in the National Basketball League (NBL), and their fifth under the leadership of head coach John Rillie.

== Roster ==
Note: Flags indicate national team eligibility at FIBA-sanctioned events. Players may hold other non-FIBA nationalities not displayed.

Perth Wildcats roster
Players
Coaches

Pos.	No.	Nat.	Name	Ht.	Wt.
C	0	(South Sudan)	Lual-Acuil, Jo (injured)	2.11 m (6 ft 11 in)	103 kg (227 lb)
G/F	1	(Australia)	Nielsen, Blake (injured) (DP)	2.00 m (6 ft 7 in)
G	2	(Australia)	Dell'Orso, Anthony	1.98 m (6 ft 6 in)	93 kg (205 lb)
G/F	3	(United States)	Windler, Dylan (I)	1.98 m (6 ft 6 in)	85 kg (187 lb)
F	5	(United States)	Doolittle, Kristian (I)	2.01 m (6 ft 7 in)	105 kg (231 lb)
G	8	(Australia)	Kopa, Tana (DP)	1.98 m (6 ft 6 in)
G	9	(Australia)	Rillie, Jaron	1.91 m (6 ft 3 in)	84 kg (185 lb)
G	13	(Australia)	Sam, Marley (DP)	1.80 m (5 ft 11 in)
G	17	(United States)	Knight, Brandon (I)	1.88 m (6 ft 2 in)	83 kg (183 lb)
F	24	(Australia)	Wagstaff, Jesse (C)	2.03 m (6 ft 8 in)	103 kg (227 lb)
F	25	(Australia)	Huefner, Cameron	2.03 m (6 ft 8 in)	104 kg (229 lb)
C	26	(Australia)	Brandt, Angus	2.08 m (6 ft 10 in)	116 kg (256 lb)
F	27	(Australia)	Higgins-Titsha, Alex	2.01 m (6 ft 7 in)	81 kg (179 lb)
G	33	(United States)	Whitt, Jimmy (IN)	1.90 m (6 ft 3 in)	79 kg (174 lb)
G	40	(Australia)	Pepper, Elijah	1.93 m (6 ft 4 in)	91 kg (201 lb)

Head coach

- (Australia) John Rillie

Assistant coach(es)

- (United States) Derrick Alston
- (United States) Ben Peterson
- (New Zealand) Aaron Young

Strength & conditioning coach(es)

- (Australia) Josh Cavanagh

Legend

- (C) Team captain
- (DP) Development player
- (I) Import player
- (SRP) Special restricted player
- (NS) Next Star player
- Injured

- Roster
Updated: 21 October 2026

=== Depth chart ===
Pos.	Starting 5	Bench 1	Bench 2	Injured
PG	Brandon Knight (I)
SG	Elijah Pepper			Jaron Rillie (injured)
SF	Dylan Windler (I)		Cameron Huefner
PF	Kristian Doolittle (I)	Jesse Wagstaff
C	Jo Lual-Acuil

== Standings ==
=== Ladder ===
Pos	2026–27 NBL season											
Pos	Team	Pld	W	L	PCT	Last 5	Streak	Home	Away	PF	PA	PP
1	Tasmania JackJumpers	14	10	4	71.43%	4–1	W2	6–2	4–2	1326	1257	105.49%
2	Sydney Kings	14	9	5	64.29%	3–2	L1	6–2	3–3	1386	1281	108.20%
3	Cairns Taipans	16	10	6	62.50%	4–1	W4	5–2	5–4	1486	1525	97.44%
4	Melbourne United	15	9	6	60.00%	4–1	W2	5–3	4–3	1470	1378	106.68%
5	Adelaide 36ers	14	7	7	50.00%	3–2	L1	3–3	4–4	1305	1305	100.00%
6	Perth Wildcats	14	7	7	50.00%	2–3	L1	7–4	0–3	1334	1369	97.44%
7	Brisbane Bullets	15	7	8	46.67%	2–3	W1	5–3	2–5	1436	1493	96.18%
8	Illawarra Hawks	17	6	11	35.29%	2–3	L1	2–4	4–7	1647	1763	93.42%
9	S.E. Melbourne Phoenix	15	5	10	33.33%	1–4	L1	3–5	2–5	1466	1466	100.00%
10	New Zealand Breakers	16	5	11	31.25%	1–4	L3	3–2	2–9	1456	1475	98.71%

Updated to match(es) played on 22 November 2026. Source: NBL.com.au

The NBL tie-breaker system as outlined in the NBL Rules and Regulations states that in the case of an identical win–loss record, the overall points percentage will determine order of seeding.

=== Ladder progression ===
Leader and qualification to semifinals
Qualification to semifinals
Qualification to play-in
Last place

2026–27 NBL season
Team ╲ Round	1	2	3	4	5	6	7	8	9	10	11	12	13	14	15	16	17	18	19	20	21
Adelaide 36ers	4	3	7	7	6	9	7	5	5	5											
Brisbane Bullets	3	2	5	8	5	5	6	6	7	7											
Cairns Taipans	9	9	8	4	7	4	5	4	4	3											
Illawarra Hawks	8	10	10	10	10	10	10	10	9	8											
Melbourne United	7	5	9	6	8	7	4	3	3	4											
New Zealand Breakers	6	7	4	5	4	8	9	9	8	10											
Perth Wildcats	10	4	3	2	3	2	3	7	6	6											
S.E. Melbourne Phoenix	5	8	6	9	9	6	8	8	10	9											
Sydney Kings	1	1	1	3	2	3	1	1	1	2											
Tasmania JackJumpers	2	6	2	1	1	1	2	2	2	1											

Updated to match(es) played on 22 November 2026. Source: NBL.com.au

== Game log ==
=== Pre-season ===
The 2026 NBL Blitz will run from 2–6 September 2026 with games being played at the Bendigo Stadium, Bendigo.

2026 NBL Blitz game log
Total: 0–2 (Home: 0–1; Road: 0–1)
September: 0–2 (Home: 0–1; Road: 0–1)

Game	Date	Team	Score	High points	High rebounds	High assists	Location Attendance	Record
1	2 September	@ Cairns	L 85–82	Elijah Pepper (19)	Anthony Dell'Orso (9)	Elijah Pepper (6)	Bendigo Stadium n/a	0–1
2	4 September	Melbourne	L 82–97	Jo Lual-Acuil (16)	Jo Lual-Acuil (9)	Kristian Doolittle (4)	Bendigo Stadium n/a	0–2

=== Regular season ===
The regular season will begin on 19 September 2026. It will consist of 165 games (33 games each) spread across 21 rounds, with the final game being played on 14 February 2027.

2026–27 game log
Total: 7–7 (Home: 7–4; Road: 0–3)
September: 2–1 (Home: 2–1; Road: 0–0)

Game	Date	Team	Score	High points	High rebounds	High assists	Location Attendance	Record
1	19 September	S.E. Melbourne	L 79–100	Kristian Doolittle (25)	Jo Lual-Acuil (8)	Kristian Doolittle (7)	Perth Arena; 10,670	0–1
2	24 September	Adelaide	W 98–97	Elijah Pepper (25)	Jo Lual-Acuil (11)	Anthony Dell'Orso (6)	Perth Arena; 10,145	1–1
3	26 September	New Zealand	W 97–93	Dylan Windler (26)	Anthony Dell'Orso (11)	Dell'Orso, Pepper (5)	Perth Arena; 9,646	2–1

October: 3–3 (Home: 3–2; Road: 0–1)

Game	Date	Team	Score	High points	High rebounds	High assists	Location Attendance	Record
4	2 October	S.E. Melbourne	W 92–88	Elijah Pepper (25)	Dylan Windler (9)	Kristian Doolittle (8)	Perth Arena; 11,831	3–1
5	10 October	New Zealand	W 100–84	Dylan Windler (32)	Dylan Windler (8)	Kristian Doolittle (9)	Perth Arena; 12,170	4–1
6	17 October	@ Sydney	L 102–81	Dylan Windler (19)	Dylan Windler (8)	Dylan Windler (8)	Sydney SuperDome; 8,032	4–2
7	23 October	Melbourne	W 103–102	Kristian Doolittle (23)	Kristian Doolittle (10)	Kristian Doolittle (8)	Perth Arena; 12,808	5–2
8	28 October	Sydney	L 91–99	Brandon Knight (27)	Kristian Doolittle (15)	Knight, Rillie (4)	Perth Arena; 10,095	5–3
9	31 October	Illawarra	L 98–105	Anthony Dell'Orso (21)	Dylan Windler (9)	Kristian Doolittle (7)	Perth Arena; 10,658	5–4

November: 2–3 (Home: 2–1; Road: 0–2)

Game	Date	Team	Score	High points	High rebounds	High assists	Location Attendance	Record
10	4 November	@ Brisbane	L 109–104	Kristian Doolittle (24)	Kristian Doolittle (7)	Kristian Doolittle (9)	Nissan Arena; 2,995	5–5
11	8 November	Cairns	L 92–100	Elijah Pepper (26)	Kristian Doolittle (8)	Jaron Rillie (7)	Perth Arena; 12,581	5–6
12	12 November	Tasmania	W 98–92	Brandon Knight (23)	Dylan Windler (10)	Doolittle, Knight (5)	Perth Arena; 9,422	6–6
13	14 November	Illawarra	W 111–110 (OT)	Kristian Doolittle (29)	Dylan Windler (11)	Jaron Rillie (6)	Perth Arena; 11,615	7–6
14	20 November	@ Cairns	L 98–90	Elijah Pepper (19)	Kristian Doolittle (10)	Brandon Knight (5)	Cairns Convention Centre; 4,099	7–7

December: 0–0 (Home: 0–0; Road: 0–0)

Game	Date	Team	Score	High points	High rebounds	High assists	Location Attendance	Record
15								–
16								–
17								–
18								–
19								–
20								–

January: 0–0 (Home: 0–0; Road: 0–0)

Game	Date	Team	Score	High points	High rebounds	High assists	Location Attendance	Record
21								–
22								–
23								–
24								–
25								–
26								–
27								–
28								–
29								–

February: 0–0 (Home: 0–0; Road: 0–0)

Game	Date	Team	Score	High points	High rebounds	High assists	Location Attendance	Record
30								–
31								–
32								–
33								–

2026–27 season schedule

=== NBL Ignite Cup ===
The NBL introduced a new finals format for the 2026–27 Ignite Cup, which will include four teams and semifinals games.

Pos	Team	Pld	W	L	PF	PA	PP	BP	Pts	Qualification
1	New Zealand Breakers	3	2	1	296	277	106.9	8	14	Semifinals
2	Sydney Kings	3	2	1	293	271	108.1	7	13	Semifinals
3	Tasmania JackJumpers	1	1	0	106	85	124.7	4	7	Semifinals
4	S.E. Melbourne Phoenix	2	1	1	211	216	97.7	4	7	Semifinals
5	Brisbane Bullets	3	1	2	272	303	89.8	3	6	
6	Illawarra Hawks	1	1	0	120	110	109.1	2	5	
7	Melbourne United	1	1	0	96	91	105.5	2	5	
8	Perth Wildcats	2	0	2	195	208	93.8	4	4	
9	Adelaide 36ers	1	0	1	91	96	94.8	2	2	
10	Cairns Taipans	1	0	1	75	98	76.5	0	0	

Updated to match(es) played on 18 November 2026. Source: Ignitecup.com.au

== Transactions ==
Free agency began on 17 April 2026.

== Awards ==
=== Club awards ===
- Club MVP:
- Coaches’ Award:
- Most Improved Player:
- Best Defensive Player:
- Players’ Player:

== See also ==
- 2026–27 NBL season
- Perth Wildcats
