= 2026–27 Adelaide 36ers season =

Australian professional basketball season

- Head coach: (Australia) Trevor Gleeson
- Captain: (Australia) Bryce Cotton
- Arena: Adelaide Entertainment Centre

NBL results
- Record: 7–7 (50%)
- Ladder: 5th
- Stats at NBL.com.au

Ignite Cup results
- Record: 0–1 (0%)
- Ladder: 9th
- All statistics correct as of 22 November 2026.

The 2026–27 Adelaide 36ers season is the 46th season of the franchise in the National Basketball League (NBL).

== Roster ==
Note: Flags indicate national team eligibility at FIBA-sanctioned events. Players may hold other non-FIBA nationalities not displayed.

Adelaide 36ers roster
Players
Coaches

Pos.	No.	Nat.	Name	Ht.	Wt.
G	0	(Australia)	Kenyon, Matt	1.96 m (6 ft 5 in)	91 kg (201 lb)
G	1	(New Zealand)	Cameron, Flynn	1.96 m (6 ft 5 in)	90 kg (198 lb)
G	2	(Australia)	White, Isaac	1.88 m (6 ft 2 in)	85 kg (187 lb)
F/C	7	(South Sudan)	Mathiang, Mangok	2.08 m (6 ft 10 in)	102 kg (225 lb)
G	11	(Australia)	Cotton, Bryce (C)	1.82 m (6 ft 0 in)	76 kg (168 lb)
G	12	(United States)	Jenkins, John (I)	1.93 m (6 ft 4 in)	98 kg (216 lb)
C	14	(Australia)	Griscti, Ben	2.11 m (6 ft 11 in)	110 kg (243 lb)
G	22	(New Zealand)	Rasmussen, Keanu	1.88 m (6 ft 2 in)	86 kg (190 lb)
G	23	(Australia)	Williams, Deonte (DP)	1.98 m (6 ft 6 in)
F	25	(Australia)	Rigoni, Jacob (NRP)	1.97 m (6 ft 6 in)	95 kg (209 lb)
F	31	(Serbia)	Rakocevic, Nick (I)	2.11 m (6 ft 11 in)	102 kg (225 lb)
F	42	(South Sudan)	Kuol, Bul (injured)	2.01 m (6 ft 7 in)	94 kg (207 lb)
G	43	(Australia)	White, Harvey (DP)	1.86 m (6 ft 1 in)	84 kg (185 lb)
G	44	(Australia)	Brown Jr., Raheim (DP)	1.96 m (6 ft 5 in)
F	45	(United States)	Cheatham, Zylan (I)	2.03 m (6 ft 8 in)	105 kg (231 lb)

Head coach

- (Australia) Trevor Gleeson

Assistant coach(es)

- (Australia) Jakob Dorricott
- (Serbia) Marko Marinović
- (Australia) Kerry Williams

Legend

- (C) Team captain
- (DP) Development player
- (IN) Inactive
- (I) Import player
- (NRP) Nominated replacement player
- (NS) Next Star player
- Injured

- Roster
Updated: 20 November 2026

=== Depth chart ===
Pos.	Starting 5	Bench 1	Development
PG	Bryce Cotton	Isaac White	Keanu Rasmussen
SG	Flynn Cameron
SF	John Jenkins (I)	Matt Kenyon
PF	Zylan Cheatham (I)
C	Isaac Humphries	Nick Rakocevic (I)	Ben Griscti

== Standings ==
=== Ladder ===
Pos	2026–27 NBL season											
Pos	Team	Pld	W	L	PCT	Last 5	Streak	Home	Away	PF	PA	PP
1	Tasmania JackJumpers	14	10	4	71.43%	4–1	W2	6–2	4–2	1326	1257	105.49%
2	Sydney Kings	14	9	5	64.29%	3–2	L1	6–2	3–3	1386	1281	108.20%
3	Cairns Taipans	16	10	6	62.50%	4–1	W4	5–2	5–4	1486	1525	97.44%
4	Melbourne United	15	9	6	60.00%	4–1	W2	5–3	4–3	1470	1378	106.68%
5	Adelaide 36ers	14	7	7	50.00%	3–2	L1	3–3	4–4	1305	1305	100.00%
6	Perth Wildcats	14	7	7	50.00%	2–3	L1	7–4	0–3	1334	1369	97.44%
7	Brisbane Bullets	15	7	8	46.67%	2–3	W1	5–3	2–5	1436	1493	96.18%
8	Illawarra Hawks	17	6	11	35.29%	2–3	L1	2–4	4–7	1647	1763	93.42%
9	S.E. Melbourne Phoenix	15	5	10	33.33%	1–4	L1	3–5	2–5	1466	1466	100.00%
10	New Zealand Breakers	16	5	11	31.25%	1–4	L3	3–2	2–9	1456	1475	98.71%

Updated to match(es) played on 22 November 2026. Source: NBL.com.au

The NBL tie-breaker system as outlined in the NBL Rules and Regulations states that in the case of an identical win–loss record, the overall points percentage will determine order of seeding.

=== Ladder progression ===
Leader and qualification to semifinals
Qualification to semifinals
Qualification to play-in
Last place

2026–27 NBL season
Team ╲ Round	1	2	3	4	5	6	7	8	9	10	11	12	13	14	15	16	17	18	19	20	21
Adelaide 36ers	4	3	7	7	6	9	7	5	5	5											
Brisbane Bullets	3	2	5	8	5	5	6	6	7	7											
Cairns Taipans	9	9	8	4	7	4	5	4	4	3											
Illawarra Hawks	8	10	10	10	10	10	10	10	9	8											
Melbourne United	7	5	9	6	8	7	4	3	3	4											
New Zealand Breakers	6	7	4	5	4	8	9	9	8	10											
Perth Wildcats	10	4	3	2	3	2	3	7	6	6											
S.E. Melbourne Phoenix	5	8	6	9	9	6	8	8	10	9											
Sydney Kings	1	1	1	3	2	3	1	1	1	2											
Tasmania JackJumpers	2	6	2	1	1	1	2	2	2	1											

Updated to match(es) played on 22 November 2026. Source: NBL.com.au

== Game log ==
=== Pre-season ===
The 2026 NBL Blitz will run from 2–6 September 2026 with games being played at the Bendigo Stadium, Bendigo.

2026 NBL Blitz game log
Total: 1–1 (Home: 1–0; Road: 0–1)
September: 1–1 (Home: 1–0; Road: 0–1)

Game	Date	Team	Score	High points	High rebounds	High assists	Location Attendance	Record
1	3 September	@ Illawarra	L 100–99	Flynn Cameron (27)	Zylan Cheatham (16)	Flynn Cameron (6)	Bendigo Stadium n/a	0–1
2	5 September	Cairns	W 112–86	Bryce Cotton (22)	Nick Rakocevic (13)	Isaac White (4)	Bendigo Stadium n/a	1–1

=== Regular season ===
The regular season will begin on 19 September 2026. It will consist of 165 games (33 games each) spread across 21 rounds, with the final game being played on 14 February 2027.

2026–27 game log
Total: 7–7 (Home: 3–3; Road: 4–4)
September: 2–1 (Home: 1–0; Road: 1–1)

Game	Date	Team	Score	High points	High rebounds	High assists	Location Attendance	Record
1	19 September	@ Melbourne	W 95–97	Bryce Cotton (29)	Nick Rakocevic (9)	Bryce Cotton (7)	John Cain Arena; 9,278	1–0
2	24 September	@ Perth	L 98–97	Bryce Cotton (37)	Zylan Cheatham (9)	Bryce Cotton (9)	Perth Arena; 10,145	1–1
3	27 September	Cairns	W 83–69	Bryce Cotton (25)	Nick Rakocevic (12)	Cheatham, Cotton (4)	Adelaide Entertainment Centre; 10,025	2–1

October: 3–4 (Home: 0–2; Road: 3–2)

Game	Date	Team	Score	High points	High rebounds	High assists	Location Attendance	Record
4	2 October	@ Illawarra	L 114–92	Bryce Cotton (15)	Nick Rakocevic (11)	Bryce Cotton (7)	Wollongong Entertainment Centre; 4,025	2–2
5	4 October	New Zealand	L 72–88	Nick Rakocevic (29)	Nick Rakocevic (16)	Bryce Cotton (6)	Adelaide Entertainment Centre; 10,044	2–3
6	7 October	Melbourne	L 91–96	Cotton, Rakocevic (33)	Nick Rakocevic (14)	Bryce Cotton (10)	Adelaide Entertainment Centre; 10,047	2–4
7	11 October	@ Sydney	W 78–84	John Jenkins (20)	Zylan Cheatham (10)	Bryce Cotton (8)	Sydney SuperDome; 13,365	3–4
8	16 October	@ Tasmania	W 88–94	Bryce Cotton (35)	Zylan Cheatham (11)	Bryce Cotton (5)	Derwent Entertainment Centre; 4,340	4–4
9	24 October	@ S.E. Melbourne	L 108–94	Bryce Cotton (37)	Nick Rakocevic (17)	Bryce Cotton (8)	John Cain Arena; 5,602	4–5
10	30 October	@ New Zealand	W 101–108	Bryce Cotton (31)	Nick Rakocevic (11)	Bryce Cotton (6)	Spark Arena; 4,492	5–5

November: 2–2 (Home: 2–1; Road: 0–1)

Game	Date	Team	Score	High points	High rebounds	High assists	Location Attendance	Record
11	1 November	Brisbane	L 89–96	Bryce Cotton (27)	Nick Rakocevic (8)	Cheatham, Cotton (9)	Adelaide Entertainment Centre; 10,039	5–6
12	7 November	Illawarra	W 106–78	Bryce Cotton (22)	Nick Rakocevic (16)	Zylan Cheatham (11)	Adelaide Entertainment Centre; 10,016	6–6
13	12 November	Melbourne	W 101–93	John Jenkins (21)	Zylan Cheatham (12)	Bryce Cotton (10)	Adelaide Entertainment Centre; 10,046	7–6
14	19 November	@ Illawarra	L 103–97	Bryce Cotton (28)	Nick Rakocevic (11)	Bryce Cotton (9)	Wollongong Entertainment Centre; 3,742	7–7

December: 0–0 (Home: 0–0; Road: 0–0)

Game	Date	Team	Score	High points	High rebounds	High assists	Location Attendance	Record
15								–
16								–
17								–
18								–
19								–
20								–
21								–
22								–

January: 0–0 (Home: 0–0; Road: 0–0)

Game	Date	Team	Score	High points	High rebounds	High assists	Location Attendance	Record
23								–
24								–
25								–
26								–
27								–
28								–
29								–
30								–

February: 0–0 (Home: 0–0; Road: 0–0)

Game	Date	Team	Score	High points	High rebounds	High assists	Location Attendance	Record
31								–
32								–
33								–

2026–27 season schedule

=== NBL Ignite Cup ===
The NBL introduced a new finals format for the 2026–27 Ignite Cup, which will include four teams and semifinals games.

Pos	Team	Pld	W	L	PF	PA	PP	BP	Pts	Qualification
1	New Zealand Breakers	3	2	1	296	277	106.9	8	14	Semifinals
2	Sydney Kings	3	2	1	293	271	108.1	7	13	Semifinals
3	Tasmania JackJumpers	1	1	0	106	85	124.7	4	7	Semifinals
4	S.E. Melbourne Phoenix	2	1	1	211	216	97.7	4	7	Semifinals
5	Brisbane Bullets	3	1	2	272	303	89.8	3	6	
6	Illawarra Hawks	1	1	0	120	110	109.1	2	5	
7	Melbourne United	1	1	0	96	91	105.5	2	5	
8	Perth Wildcats	2	0	2	195	208	93.8	4	4	
9	Adelaide 36ers	1	0	1	91	96	94.8	2	2	
10	Cairns Taipans	1	0	1	75	98	76.5	0	0	

Updated to match(es) played on 18 November 2026. Source: Ignitecup.com.au

== Transactions ==
Free agency began on 17 April 2026.

== Awards ==
=== Club awards ===
- Club MVP:
- Most Improved:
- Coaches Award:
- Members Choice:
- Best Defensive Player:
- Chairman's Award:

== See also ==
- 2026–27 NBL season
- Adelaide 36ers
