= 2026–27 Cairns Taipans season =

Australian professional basketball season

- Head coach: (Australia) Adam Forde
- Captain: (Australia) Shaun Bruce
- Arena: Cairns Convention Centre

NBL results
- Record: 10–6 (62.5%)
- Ladder: 2nd
- Stats at NBL.com.au

Ignite Cup results
- Record: 0–1 (0%)
- Ladder: 10th
- All statistics correct as of 22 November 2026.

The 2026–27 Cairns Taipans season is the 28th season of the franchise in the National Basketball League (NBL), and the sixth season under the leadership of their head coach Adam Forde.

== Roster ==
Note: Flags indicate national team eligibility at FIBA-sanctioned events. Players may hold other non-FIBA nationalities not displayed.

Cairns Taipans roster
Players
Coaches

Pos.	No.	Nat.	Name	Ht.	Wt.
G	1	(Australia)	McVeigh, Lloyd (DP)	1.98 m (6 ft 6 in)	92 kg (203 lb)
G	2	(Australia)	Smith, Reyne	1.88 m (6 ft 2 in)	86 kg (190 lb)
G	3	(United States)	Brown, Jaylon (I)	1.83 m (6 ft 0 in)	84 kg (185 lb)
G	5	(Australia)	Nunn, Brody (DP)	1.85 m (6 ft 1 in)	77 kg (170 lb)
F	6	(Australia)	Galloway, Jaylin (injured)	1.97 m (6 ft 6 in)	92 kg (203 lb)
G	7	(Australia)	Bruce, Shaun (C)	1.92 m (6 ft 4 in)	87 kg (192 lb)
F	9	(Australia)	McVeigh, Jack	2.03 m (6 ft 8 in)	93 kg (205 lb)
G	10	(Australia)	Paul, Luke (NS)	1.98 m (6 ft 6 in)
F	14	(Australia)	Galloway, Kyrin	2.03 m (6 ft 8 in)	98 kg (216 lb)
F/C	19	(Australia)	Yates, Luca (DP)	2.08 m (6 ft 10 in)	102 kg (225 lb)
F	22	(New Zealand)	Brown, Walter (injured)	1.94 m (6 ft 4 in)	89 kg (196 lb)
F	25	(Australia)	Pinder, Keanu	2.10 m (6 ft 11 in)	103 kg (227 lb)
F	33	(Trinidad and Tobago)	Lewis, Malique (I)	2.02 m (6 ft 8 in)	99 kg (218 lb)
F	43	(Australia)	Bolden, Jonah	2.03 m (6 ft 8 in)	106 kg (234 lb)
G	44	(South Sudan)	Dech, Sunday (injured)	1.95 m (6 ft 5 in)	92 kg (203 lb)

Head coach

- (Australia) Adam Forde

Assistant coach(es)

- (Australia) Angus Henskens
- (Australia) Will Lopez
- (Australia) Sinisa Markovic

Legend

- (C) Team captain
- (DP) Development player
- (IN) Inactive
- (I) Import player
- (IRP) Injury replacement player
- (NRP) Nominated replacement player
- Injured

- Roster
Updated: 4 November 2026

=== Depth chart ===
Pos.	Starting 5	Bench
PG
SG	Reyne Smith	Lloyd McVeigh (DP)
SF
PF	Jack McVeigh	Kyrin Galloway
C

== Standings ==
=== Ladder ===
Pos	2026–27 NBL season											
Pos	Team	Pld	W	L	PCT	Last 5	Streak	Home	Away	PF	PA	PP
1	Tasmania JackJumpers	14	10	4	71.43%	4–1	W2	6–2	4–2	1326	1257	105.49%
2	Sydney Kings	14	9	5	64.29%	3–2	L1	6–2	3–3	1386	1281	108.20%
3	Cairns Taipans	16	10	6	62.50%	4–1	W4	5–2	5–4	1486	1525	97.44%
4	Melbourne United	15	9	6	60.00%	4–1	W2	5–3	4–3	1470	1378	106.68%
5	Adelaide 36ers	14	7	7	50.00%	3–2	L1	3–3	4–4	1305	1305	100.00%
6	Perth Wildcats	14	7	7	50.00%	2–3	L1	7–4	0–3	1334	1369	97.44%
7	Brisbane Bullets	15	7	8	46.67%	2–3	W1	5–3	2–5	1436	1493	96.18%
8	Illawarra Hawks	17	6	11	35.29%	2–3	L1	2–4	4–7	1647	1763	93.42%
9	S.E. Melbourne Phoenix	15	5	10	33.33%	1–4	L1	3–5	2–5	1466	1466	100.00%
10	New Zealand Breakers	16	5	11	31.25%	1–4	L3	3–2	2–9	1456	1475	98.71%

Updated to match(es) played on 22 November 2026. Source: NBL.com.au

The NBL tie-breaker system as outlined in the NBL Rules and Regulations states that in the case of an identical win–loss record, the overall points percentage will determine order of seeding.

=== Ladder progression ===
Leader and qualification to semifinals
Qualification to semifinals
Qualification to play-in
Last place

2026–27 NBL season
Team ╲ Round	1	2	3	4	5	6	7	8	9	10	11	12	13	14	15	16	17	18	19	20	21
Adelaide 36ers	4	3	7	7	6	9	7	5	5	5											
Brisbane Bullets	3	2	5	8	5	5	6	6	7	7											
Cairns Taipans	9	9	8	4	7	4	5	4	4	3											
Illawarra Hawks	8	10	10	10	10	10	10	10	9	8											
Melbourne United	7	5	9	6	8	7	4	3	3	4											
New Zealand Breakers	6	7	4	5	4	8	9	9	8	10											
Perth Wildcats	10	4	3	2	3	2	3	7	6	6											
S.E. Melbourne Phoenix	5	8	6	9	9	6	8	8	10	9											
Sydney Kings	1	1	1	3	2	3	1	1	1	2											
Tasmania JackJumpers	2	6	2	1	1	1	2	2	2	1											

Updated to match(es) played on 22 November 2026. Source: NBL.com.au

== Game log ==
=== Pre-season ===
The 2026 NBL Blitz will run from 2–6 September 2026 with games being played at the Bendigo Stadium, Bendigo.

2026 NBL Blitz game log
Total: 1–1 (Home: 1–0; Road: 0–1)
September: 1–1 (Home: 1–0; Road: 0–1)

Game	Date	Team	Score	High points	High rebounds	High assists	Location Attendance	Record
1	2 September	Perth	W 85–82	Reyne Smith (18)	Keanu Pinder (14)	Shaun Bruce (6)	Bendigo Stadium n/a	1–0
2	5 September	@ Adelaide	L 112–86	Reyne Smith (14)	Lloyd McVeigh (6)	Walter Brown (4)	Bendigo Stadium n/a	1–1

=== Regular season ===
The regular season will begin on 19 September 2026. It will consist of 165 games (33 games each) spread across 21 rounds, with the final game being played on 14 February 2027.

2026–27 game log
Total: 9–6 (Home: 5–2; Road: 4–4)
September: 1–3 (Home: 1–0; Road: 0–3)

Game	Date	Team	Score	High points	High rebounds	High assists	Location Attendance	Record
1	20 September	@ Sydney	L 111–90	Keanu Pinder (27)	Jonah Bolden (13)	Jaylon Brown (6)	Sydney SuperDome; 13,632	0–1
2	23 September	Tasmania	W 93–87	Jaylon Brown (20)	Malique Lewis (10)	three players (4)	Cairns Convention Centre; 4,636	1–1
3	27 September	@ Adelaide	L 83–69	Jack McVeigh (21)	Keanu Pinder (7)	Bruce, Lewis (4)	Adelaide Entertainment Centre; 10,025	1–2
4	30 September	@ New Zealand	L 98–75	Jack McVeigh (16)	Keanu Pinder (7)	Lewis, J.McVeigh (3)	Spark Arena; 5,187	1–3

October: 5–2 (Home: 2–1; Road: 3–1)

Game	Date	Team	Score	High points	High rebounds	High assists	Location Attendance	Record
5	3 October	@ Melbourne	W 95–107	Keanu Pinder (27)	Jonah Bolden (10)	four players (4)	John Cain Arena; 8,684	2–3
6	8 October	Brisbane	W 97–91	Jaylon Brown (25)	Keanu Pinder (9)	Jack McVeigh (7)	Cairns Convention Centre; 4,254	3–3
7	11 October	@ Illawarra	W 100–110	Jack McVeigh (32)	Jonah Bolden (8)	Jaylon Brown (9)	Wollongong Entertainment Centre; 3,836	4–3
8	17 October	@ S.E. Melbourne	L 115–83	Jonah Bolden (17)	four players (5)	Shaun Bruce (5)	John Cain Arena; 5,661	4–4
9	25 October	New Zealand	W 86–84	J.Galloway, J.McVeigh (18)	Jonah Bolden (14)	Jack McVeigh (7)	Cairns Convention Centre; 4,414	5–4
10	29 October	@ Brisbane	W 85–107	Jack McVeigh (23)	Jonah Bolden (13)	Jaylon Brown (5)	Brisbane Entertainment Centre; 2,906	6–4
11	31 October	Melbourne	L 97–113	Jack McVeigh (19)	Jonah Bolden (7)	Brown, J.McVeigh (7)	Cairns Convention Centre; 4,028	6–5

November: 3–1 (Home: 2–1; Road: 1–0)

Game	Date	Team	Score	High points	High rebounds	High assists	Location Attendance	Record
12	5 November	Illawarra	L 95–107	Keanu Pinder (21)	Lewis, Pinder (8)	Jack McVeigh (7)	Cairns Convention Centre; 4,377	6–6
13	8 November	@ Perth	W 92–100	Jack McVeigh (36)	Bolden, Pinder (7)	Keanu Pinder (6)	Perth Arena; 12,581	7–6
14	13 November	Sydney	W 84–82	Keanu Pinder (24)	Keanu Pinder (10)	Shaun Bruce (4)	Cairns Convention Centre; 4,016	8–6
15	20 November	Perth	W 98–90	Jaylon Brown (31)	Jack McVeigh (9)	Jonah Bolden (5)	Cairns Convention Centre; 4,099	9–6
16	22 November	@ S.E. Melbourne					John Cain Arena	–

December: 0–0 (Home: 0–0; Road: 0–0)

Game	Date	Team	Score	High points	High rebounds	High assists	Location Attendance	Record
17								–
18								–
19								–
20								–
21								–
22								–
23								–
24								–

January: 0–0 (Home: 0–0; Road: 0–0)

Game	Date	Team	Score	High points	High rebounds	High assists	Location Attendance	Record
25								–
26								–
27								–
28								–
29								–
30								–
31								–

February: 0–0 (Home: 0–0; Road: 0–0)

Game	Date	Team	Score	High points	High rebounds	High assists	Location Attendance	Record
32								–
33								–

2026–27 season schedule

=== NBL Ignite Cup ===
The NBL introduced a new finals format for the 2026–27 Ignite Cup, which will include four teams and semifinals games.

Pos	Team	Pld	W	L	PF	PA	PP	BP	Pts	Qualification
1	New Zealand Breakers	3	2	1	296	277	106.9	8	14	Semifinals
2	Sydney Kings	3	2	1	293	271	108.1	7	13	Semifinals
3	Tasmania JackJumpers	1	1	0	106	85	124.7	4	7	Semifinals
4	S.E. Melbourne Phoenix	2	1	1	211	216	97.7	4	7	Semifinals
5	Brisbane Bullets	3	1	2	272	303	89.8	3	6	
6	Illawarra Hawks	1	1	0	120	110	109.1	2	5	
7	Melbourne United	1	1	0	96	91	105.5	2	5	
8	Perth Wildcats	2	0	2	195	208	93.8	4	4	
9	Adelaide 36ers	1	0	1	91	96	94.8	2	2	
10	Cairns Taipans	1	0	1	75	98	76.5	0	0	

Updated to match(es) played on 18 November 2026. Source: Ignitecup.com.au

== Transactions ==
Free agency began on 17 April 2026.

== Awards ==
=== Club awards ===
- Club MVP:
- Defensive Player:
- Players’ Player:
- Members’ Choice MVP:
- Coaches Award:
- Commitment to Community:
- Club Person of the Year:

== See also ==
- 2026–27 NBL season
