= 2026–27 Illawarra Hawks season =

Australian professional basketball season

- Head coach: (United States) Justin Tatum
- Co-captains: (Australia) Sam Froling (Australia) Tyler Harvey
- Arena: Wollongong Entertainment Centre

NBL results
- Record: 6–11 (35.3%)
- Ladder: 8th
- Stats at NBL.com.au

Ignite Cup results
- Record: 1–0 (100.0%)
- Ladder: 6th
- All statistics correct as of 22 November 2026.

The 2026–27 Illawarra Hawks season is the 49th season of the franchise in the National Basketball League (NBL).

== Roster ==
Note: Flags indicate national team eligibility at FIBA-sanctioned events. Players may hold other non-FIBA nationalities not displayed.

Illawarra Hawks roster
Players
Coaches

Pos.	No.	Nat.	Name	Ht.	Wt.
G	1	(Australia)	Harvey, Tyler (C)	1.93 m (6 ft 4 in)	84 kg (185 lb)
F	3	(Australia)	Doyle, Amarco (DP)	2.00 m (6 ft 7 in)
G	5	(Australia)	Adnam, Kyle (NRP)	1.86 m (6 ft 1 in)	84 kg (185 lb)
G	6	(Australia)	Hickey, William	1.94 m (6 ft 4 in)	92 kg (203 lb)
G/F	9	(Australia)	Swaka Lo Buluk, Wani	1.98 m (6 ft 6 in)	88 kg (194 lb)
G	10	(Australia)	McGregor, Brodie (DP)
G/F	11	(Australia)	Grida, Daniel	1.97 m (6 ft 6 in)	93 kg (205 lb)
F/C	13	(Australia)	Froling, Sam (C)	2.13 m (7 ft 0 in)	109 kg (240 lb)
G	16	(Australia)	Narkle, Johny	1.99 m (6 ft 6 in)	79 kg (174 lb)
F	21	(Australia)	Blanchfield, Todd	1.98 m (6 ft 6 in)	98 kg (216 lb)
F	22	(Australia)	Peatling, Mason (injured)	2.03 m (6 ft 8 in)	105 kg (231 lb)
G/F	24	(United States)	Patterson, Lamar (IRP)	1.96 m (6 ft 5 in)	100 kg (220 lb)
F	25	(Australia)	MacDonald, Fletcher (DP)	2.03 m (6 ft 8 in)	93 kg (205 lb)
F	30	(United States)	Martin, Kelan (I)	1.96 m (6 ft 5 in)	104 kg (229 lb)
G	35	(United States)	Doyle, Milton (I)	1.93 m (6 ft 4 in)	86 kg (190 lb)
C	44	(Australia)	Maker, Makur	2.08 m (6 ft 10 in)	107 kg (236 lb)

Head coach

- (United States) Justin Tatum

Assistant coach(es)

- (Australia) Tom Cranney
- (Australia) Matt Flinn
- (Australia) Sam Gruggen
- (Australia) Joel Khalu

Strength & conditioning coach(es)

- (Australia) Alex Moore

Legend

- (C) Team captain
- (DP) Development player
- (I) Import player
- (TP) Training player
- (IRP) Injury replacement player
- (NRP) Nominated replacement player
- (NS) Next Star player
- Injured

- Roster
Updated: 9 October 2026

=== Depth chart ===
Pos.	Starting 5	Bench 1	Development
PG	William Hickey
SG	Tyler Harvey	Johny Narkle
SF	Wani Swaka Lo Buluk	Todd Blanchfield	Daniel Grida
PF	Sam Froling	Mason Peatling
C

== Standings ==
=== Ladder ===
Pos	2026–27 NBL season											
Pos	Team	Pld	W	L	PCT	Last 5	Streak	Home	Away	PF	PA	PP
1	Tasmania JackJumpers	14	10	4	71.43%	4–1	W2	6–2	4–2	1326	1257	105.49%
2	Sydney Kings	14	9	5	64.29%	3–2	L1	6–2	3–3	1386	1281	108.20%
3	Cairns Taipans	16	10	6	62.50%	4–1	W4	5–2	5–4	1486	1525	97.44%
4	Melbourne United	15	9	6	60.00%	4–1	W2	5–3	4–3	1470	1378	106.68%
5	Adelaide 36ers	14	7	7	50.00%	3–2	L1	3–3	4–4	1305	1305	100.00%
6	Perth Wildcats	14	7	7	50.00%	2–3	L1	7–4	0–3	1334	1369	97.44%
7	Brisbane Bullets	15	7	8	46.67%	2–3	W1	5–3	2–5	1436	1493	96.18%
8	Illawarra Hawks	17	6	11	35.29%	2–3	L1	2–4	4–7	1647	1763	93.42%
9	S.E. Melbourne Phoenix	15	5	10	33.33%	1–4	L1	3–5	2–5	1466	1466	100.00%
10	New Zealand Breakers	16	5	11	31.25%	1–4	L3	3–2	2–9	1456	1475	98.71%

Updated to match(es) played on 22 November 2026. Source: NBL.com.au

The NBL tie-breaker system as outlined in the NBL Rules and Regulations states that in the case of an identical win–loss record, the overall points percentage will determine order of seeding.

=== Ladder progression ===
Leader and qualification to semifinals
Qualification to semifinals
Qualification to play-in
Last place

2026–27 NBL season
Team ╲ Round	1	2	3	4	5	6	7	8	9	10	11	12	13	14	15	16	17	18	19	20	21
Adelaide 36ers	4	3	7	7	6	9	7	5	5	5											
Brisbane Bullets	3	2	5	8	5	5	6	6	7	7											
Cairns Taipans	9	9	8	4	7	4	5	4	4	3											
Illawarra Hawks	8	10	10	10	10	10	10	10	9	8											
Melbourne United	7	5	9	6	8	7	4	3	3	4											
New Zealand Breakers	6	7	4	5	4	8	9	9	8	10											
Perth Wildcats	10	4	3	2	3	2	3	7	6	6											
S.E. Melbourne Phoenix	5	8	6	9	9	6	8	8	10	9											
Sydney Kings	1	1	1	3	2	3	1	1	1	2											
Tasmania JackJumpers	2	6	2	1	1	1	2	2	2	1											

Updated to match(es) played on 22 November 2026. Source: NBL.com.au

== Game log ==
=== Pre-season ===
The 2026 NBL Blitz will run from 2–6 September 2026 with games being played at the Bendigo Stadium, Bendigo.

2026 NBL Blitz game log
Total: 1–1 (Home: 1–0; Road: 0–1)
September: 1–1 (Home: 1–0; Road: 0–1)

Game	Date	Team	Score	High points	High rebounds	High assists	Location Attendance	Record
1	3 September	Adelaide	W 100–99	Milton Doyle (23)	Sam Froling (7)	William Hickey (7)	Bendigo Stadium n/a	1–0
2	6 September	@ Melbourne	L 103–98	Kelan Martin (20)	William Hickey (8)	William Hickey (6)	Bendigo Stadium n/a	1–1

=== Regular season ===
The regular season will begin on 19 September 2026. It will consist of 165 games (33 games each) spread across 21 rounds, with the final game being played on 14 February 2027.

2026–27 game log
Total: 6–10 (Home: 2–4; Road: 4–6)
September: 0–3 (Home: 0–0; Road: 0–3)

Game	Date	Team	Score	High points	High rebounds	High assists	Location Attendance	Record
1	20 September	@ New Zealand	L 95–81	William Hickey (18)	William Hickey (9)	William Hickey (5)	Spark Arena; 3,748	0–1
2	25 September	@ Brisbane	L 103–95	Tyler Harvey (20)	Sam Froling (10)	Milton Doyle (5)	Brisbane Entertainment Centre; 4,045	0–2
3	27 September	@ Sydney	L 121–100	Froling, Martin (21)	Kelan Martin (7)	Milton Doyle (6)	Sydney SuperDome; 9,402	0–3

October: 3–5 (Home: 1–4; Road: 2–1)

Game	Date	Team	Score	High points	High rebounds	High assists	Location Attendance	Record
4	2 October	Adelaide	W 114–92	Kelan Martin (28)	Sam Froling (13)	three players (7)	Wollongong Entertainment Centre; 4,025	1–3
5	4 October	@ S.E. Melbourne	L 113–96	Kelan Martin (17)	Hickey, Narkle (7)	Milton Doyle (11)	John Cain Arena; 6,623	1–4
6	9 October	Tasmania	L 112–122	Kelan Martin (23)	four players (4)	William Hickey (4)	Wollongong Entertainment Centre; 3,814	1–5
7	11 October	Cairns	L 100–110	Makur Maker (18)	Sam Froling (12)	Milton Doyle (5)	Wollongong Entertainment Centre; 3,836	1–6
8	11 October	@ Melbourne	W 89–91	Makur Maker (23)	Froling, Maker (6)	Milton Doyle (7)	John Cain Arena; 9,679	2–6
9	22 October	Sydney	L 82–108	Makur Maker (24)	Makur Maker (7)	Lamar Patterson (5)	Wollongong Entertainment Centre; 3,987	2–7
10	24 October	Brisbane	L 81–98	Todd Blanchfield (19)	Froling, Maker (6)	Doyle, Harvey (4)	Wollongong Entertainment Centre; 3,948	2–8
11	31 October	@ Perth	W 98–105	Kelan Martin (23)	William Hickey (8)	William Hickey (8)	Perth Arena; 10,658	3–8

November: 3–2 (Home: 1–0; Road: 2–2)

Game	Date	Team	Score	High points	High rebounds	High assists	Location Attendance	Record
12	5 November	@ Cairns	W 95–107	Makur Maker (24)	Makur Maker (9)	three players (3)	Cairns Convention Centre; 4,377	4–8
13	7 November	@ Adelaide	L 106–78	Tyler Harvey (19)	Todd Blanchfield (8)	William Hickey (12)	Adelaide Entertainment Centre; 10,016	4–9
14	11 November	@ S.E. Melbourne	W 110–120	Kelan Martin (27)	William Hickey (9)	William Hickey (8)	State Basketball Centre; 1,838	5–9
15	14 November	@ Perth	L 111–100 (OT)	Makur Maker (21)	Sam Froling (12)	William Hickey (10)	Perth Arena; 11,615	5–10
16	19 November	Adelaide	W 103–97	Makur Maker (23)	Makur Maker (13)	Milton Doyle (7)	Wollongong Entertainment Centre; 3,742	6–10
17	21 November	@ Tasmania					Derwent Entertainment Centre	–

December: 0–0 (Home: 0–0; Road: 0–0)

Game	Date	Team	Score	High points	High rebounds	High assists	Location Attendance	Record
18								–
19								–
20								–
21								–
22								–
23								–

January: 0–0 (Home: 0–0; Road: 0–0)

Game	Date	Team	Score	High points	High rebounds	High assists	Location Attendance	Record
24								–
25								–
26								–
27								–
28								–
29								–
30								–
31								–

February: 0–0 (Home: 0–0; Road: 0–0)

Game	Date	Team	Score	High points	High rebounds	High assists	Location Attendance	Record
32								–
33								–

2026–27 season schedule

=== NBL Ignite Cup ===
The NBL introduced a new finals format for the 2026–27 Ignite Cup, which will include four teams and semifinals games.

Pos	Team	Pld	W	L	PF	PA	PP	BP	Pts	Qualification
1	New Zealand Breakers	3	2	1	296	277	106.9	8	14	Semifinals
2	Sydney Kings	3	2	1	293	271	108.1	7	13	Semifinals
3	Tasmania JackJumpers	1	1	0	106	85	124.7	4	7	Semifinals
4	S.E. Melbourne Phoenix	2	1	1	211	216	97.7	4	7	Semifinals
5	Brisbane Bullets	3	1	2	272	303	89.8	3	6	
6	Illawarra Hawks	1	1	0	120	110	109.1	2	5	
7	Melbourne United	1	1	0	96	91	105.5	2	5	
8	Perth Wildcats	2	0	2	195	208	93.8	4	4	
9	Adelaide 36ers	1	0	1	91	96	94.8	2	2	
10	Cairns Taipans	1	0	1	75	98	76.5	0	0	

Updated to match(es) played on 18 November 2026. Source: Ignitecup.com.au

== Transactions ==
Free agency began on 17 April 2026.

== Awards ==
=== Club awards ===
- Club MVP:
- Most Improved Player:
- Player's Player award:
- Defensive Player:
- Coaches' award:
- Club Person of the Year:
- Phil Driscoll OAM Volunteer of the Year Award:

== See also ==
- 2026–27 NBL season
- Illawarra Hawks
