= 2026–27 Tasmania JackJumpers season =

Australian professional basketball season

- Head coach: (United States) Scott Roth
- Captain: (Australia) Will Magnay
- Arena: Derwent Entertainment Centre

NBL results
- Record: 10–4 (71.4%)
- Ladder: 1st
- Stats at NBL.com.au

Ignite Cup results
- Record: 1–0 (100.0%)
- Ladder: 3rd
- All statistics correct as of 22 November 2026.

The 2026–27 Tasmania JackJumpers season is the 6th season for the franchise in the National Basketball League (NBL).

== Roster ==
Note: Flags indicate national team eligibility at FIBA-sanctioned events. Players may hold other non-FIBA nationalities not displayed.

Tasmania JackJumpers roster
Players
Coaches

| Pos. | No. | Nat. | Name | Ht. | Wt. |
|---|---|---|---|---|---|
| G | 0 | (United States) | Hamilton, Bryce (injured) (I) | 1.93 m (6 ft 4 in) | 93 kg (205 lb) |
| G | 1 | (Australia) | Armstrong, Taran (VC) | 1.96 m (6 ft 5 in) | 88 kg (194 lb) |
| F | 4 | (Australia) | Richardson, Jed (DP) | 2.08 m (6 ft 10 in) |
| F | 5 | (South Sudan) | Deng, Majok (injured) | 2.05 m (6 ft 9 in) | 84 kg (185 lb) |
| G | 6 | (Australia) | Stattmann, Kody | 2.02 m (6 ft 8 in) | 91 kg (201 lb) |
| G | 7 | (United States) | Johnson, David (I) | 1.93 m (6 ft 4 in) | 92 kg (203 lb) |
| G/F | 8 | (Australia) | Haywood, Ryley (DP) | 1.94 m (6 ft 4 in) |
| G | 9 | (Australia) | Stoddart, Nicholas (IRP) | 1.88 m (6 ft 2 in) |
| G | 10 | (Australia) | Ayre, Ben | 1.84 m (6 ft 0 in) | 80 kg (176 lb) |
| F | 11 | (Australia) | Marshall, Nick (injured) | 1.98 m (6 ft 6 in) | 90 kg (198 lb) |
| F | 12 | (New Zealand) | Gold, Ben (injured) | 2.11 m (6 ft 11 in) | 107 kg (236 lb) |
| C | 22 | (Australia) | Magnay, Will (C) | 2.08 m (6 ft 10 in) | 111 kg (245 lb) |
| G | 31 | (United States) | Mathias, Dakota (I) | 1.93 m (6 ft 4 in) | 91 kg (201 lb) |
| F | 33 | (Australia) | Bannan, Josh (VC) | 2.08 m (6 ft 10 in) | 100 kg (220 lb) |

Head coach

- (United States) Scott Roth

Assistant coach(es)

- (Australia) Nathan Brereton
- (Australia) Mark Radford
- (Australia) Jarrad Weeks

Team manager

- (Australia) Mark Chivers

Legend

- (C) Team captain
- (DP) Development player
- (IN) Inactive
- (I) Import player
- (IRP) Injury replacement player
- Injured

- Roster
Updated: 20 November 2026

=== Depth chart ===
| Pos. | Starting 5 | Bench | Injured |
|---|---|---|---|
| PG | | Ben Ayre |
| SG | | Nicholas Stoddart (IRP) | David Johnson (I) (injured) |
| SF | Nick Marshall | | Bryce Hamilton (I) (injured) |
| PF | Josh Bannan | Majok Deng |
| C | Will Magnay |

== Standings ==
=== Ladder ===
| Pos | 2026–27 NBL season | | | | | | | | | | | |
| Pos | Team | Pld | W | L | PCT | Last 5 | Streak | Home | Away | PF | PA | PP |
|---|---|---|---|---|---|---|---|---|---|---|---|---|
| 1 | Tasmania JackJumpers | 14 | 10 | 4 | 71.43% | 4–1 | W2 | 6–2 | 4–2 | 1326 | 1257 | 105.49% |
| 2 | Sydney Kings | 14 | 9 | 5 | 64.29% | 3–2 | L1 | 6–2 | 3–3 | 1386 | 1281 | 108.20% |
| 3 | Cairns Taipans | 16 | 10 | 6 | 62.50% | 4–1 | W4 | 5–2 | 5–4 | 1486 | 1525 | 97.44% |
| 4 | Melbourne United | 15 | 9 | 6 | 60.00% | 4–1 | W2 | 5–3 | 4–3 | 1470 | 1378 | 106.68% |
| 5 | Adelaide 36ers | 14 | 7 | 7 | 50.00% | 3–2 | L1 | 3–3 | 4–4 | 1305 | 1305 | 100.00% |
| 6 | Perth Wildcats | 14 | 7 | 7 | 50.00% | 2–3 | L1 | 7–4 | 0–3 | 1334 | 1369 | 97.44% |
| 7 | Brisbane Bullets | 15 | 7 | 8 | 46.67% | 2–3 | W1 | 5–3 | 2–5 | 1436 | 1493 | 96.18% |
| 8 | Illawarra Hawks | 17 | 6 | 11 | 35.29% | 2–3 | L1 | 2–4 | 4–7 | 1647 | 1763 | 93.42% |
| 9 | S.E. Melbourne Phoenix | 15 | 5 | 10 | 33.33% | 1–4 | L1 | 3–5 | 2–5 | 1466 | 1466 | 100.00% |
| 10 | New Zealand Breakers | 16 | 5 | 11 | 31.25% | 1–4 | L3 | 3–2 | 2–9 | 1456 | 1475 | 98.71% |

Updated to match(es) played on 22 November 2026. Source: NBL.com.au

The NBL tie-breaker system as outlined in the NBL Rules and Regulations states that in the case of an identical win–loss record, the overall points percentage will determine order of seeding.

=== Ladder progression ===
| Leader and qualification to semifinals |
| Qualification to semifinals |
| Qualification to play-in |
| Last place |

2026–27 NBL season
| Team ╲ Round | 1 | 2 | 3 | 4 | 5 | 6 | 7 | 8 | 9 | 10 | 11 | 12 | 13 | 14 | 15 | 16 | 17 | 18 | 19 | 20 | 21 |
|---|---|---|---|---|---|---|---|---|---|---|---|---|---|---|---|---|---|---|---|---|---|
| Adelaide 36ers | 4 | 3 | 7 | 7 | 6 | 9 | 7 | 5 | 5 | 5 | | | | | | | | | | | |
| Brisbane Bullets | 3 | 2 | 5 | 8 | 5 | 5 | 6 | 6 | 7 | 7 | | | | | | | | | | | |
| Cairns Taipans | 9 | 9 | 8 | 4 | 7 | 4 | 5 | 4 | 4 | 3 | | | | | | | | | | | |
| Illawarra Hawks | 8 | 10 | 10 | 10 | 10 | 10 | 10 | 10 | 9 | 8 | | | | | | | | | | | |
| Melbourne United | 7 | 5 | 9 | 6 | 8 | 7 | 4 | 3 | 3 | 4 | | | | | | | | | | | |
| New Zealand Breakers | 6 | 7 | 4 | 5 | 4 | 8 | 9 | 9 | 8 | 10 | | | | | | | | | | | |
| Perth Wildcats | 10 | 4 | 3 | 2 | 3 | 2 | 3 | 7 | 6 | 6 | | | | | | | | | | | |
| S.E. Melbourne Phoenix | 5 | 8 | 6 | 9 | 9 | 6 | 8 | 8 | 10 | 9 | | | | | | | | | | | |
| Sydney Kings | 1 | 1 | 1 | 3 | 2 | 3 | 1 | 1 | 1 | 2 | | | | | | | | | | | |
| Tasmania JackJumpers | 2 | 6 | 2 | 1 | 1 | 1 | 2 | 2 | 2 | 1 | | | | | | | | | | | |

Updated to match(es) played on 22 November 2026. Source: NBL.com.au

== Game log ==
=== Pre-season ===
The 2026 NBL Blitz will run from 2–6 September 2026 with games being played at the Bendigo Stadium, Bendigo.

2026 NBL Blitz game log
Total: 0–2 (Home: 0–1; Road: 0–1)
September: 0–2 (Home: 0–1; Road: 0–1)

| Game | Date | Team | Score | High points | High rebounds | High assists | Location Attendance | Record |
|---|---|---|---|---|---|---|---|---|
| 1 | 3 September | @ Brisbane | L 112–91 | Taran Armstrong (25) | Ben Gold (11) | Taran Armstrong (7) | Bendigo Stadium n/a | 0–1 |
| 2 | 6 September | New Zealand | L 86–96 | Taran Armstrong (17) | Nick Marshall (7) | Taran Armstrong (8) | Bendigo Stadium n/a | 0–2 |

=== Regular season ===
The regular season will begin on 19 September 2026. It will consist of 165 games (33 games each) spread across 21 rounds, with the final game being played on 14 February 2027.

2026–27 game log
Total: 9–4 (Home: 5–2; Road: 4–2)
September: 1–1 (Home: 1–0; Road: 0–1)

| Game | Date | Team | Score | High points | High rebounds | High assists | Location Attendance | Record |
|---|---|---|---|---|---|---|---|---|
| 1 | 21 September | S.E. Melbourne | W 96–91 | David Johnson (26) | Johnson, Mathias (6) | Johnson, Magnay (6) | Derwent Entertainment Centre; 4,340 | 1–0 |
| 2 | 23 September | @ Cairns | L 93–87 | Taran Armstrong (20) | Nick Marshall (9) | Taran Armstrong (7) | Cairns Convention Centre; 4,636 | 1–1 |

October: 5–1 (Home: 3–1; Road: 2–0)

| Game | Date | Team | Score | High points | High rebounds | High assists | Location Attendance | Record |
|---|---|---|---|---|---|---|---|---|
| 3 | 1 October | Melbourne | W 84–82 | Will Magnay (17) | Will Magnay (11) | Taran Armstrong (6) | Derwent Entertainment Centre; 4,340 | 2–1 |
| 4 | 3 October | @ Brisbane | W 99–109 (OT) | Taran Armstrong (29) | Josh Bannan (11) | Will Magnay (6) | Brisbane Entertainment Centre; 5,556 | 3–1 |
| 5 | 9 October | @ Illawarra | W 112–122 | David Johnson (32) | Will Magnay (9) | Will Magnay (8) | Wollongong Entertainment Centre; 3,814 | 4–1 |
| 6 | 16 October | Adelaide | L 88–94 | Taran Armstrong (20) | Bannan, Gold (7) | Taran Armstrong (10) | Derwent Entertainment Centre; 4,340 | 4–2 |
| 7 | 18 October | New Zealand | W 98–92 | Taran Armstrong (32) | Will Magnay (8) | Will Magnay (6) | Derwent Entertainment Centre; 4,340 | 5–2 |
| 8 | 21 October | Brisbane | W 106–85 | Josh Bannan (22) | Josh Bannan (9) | Will Magnay (7) | Derwent Entertainment Centre; 4,320 | 6–2 |
| 9 | 30 October | Sydney | L 68–71 | Dakota Mathias (20) | Will Magnay (14) | Josh Bannan (5) | Silverdome; 3,260 | 6–3 |

November: 3–1 (Home: 1–0; Road: 2–1)

| Game | Date | Team | Score | High points | High rebounds | High assists | Location Attendance | Record |
|---|---|---|---|---|---|---|---|---|
| 10 | 1 November | @ S.E. Melbourne | W 89–98 | Dakota Mathias (22) | Marshall, Mathias (7) | Dakota Mathias (6) | John Cain Arena; 9,501 | 7–3 |
| 11 | 6 November | New Zealand | W 79–77 | Dakota Mathias (18) | Josh Bannan (11) | Josh Bannan (7) | Silverdome; 3,260 | 8–3 |
| 12 | 12 November | @ Perth | L 98–92 | Taran Armstrong (20) | Bannan, Magnay (12) | Taran Armstrong (7) | Perth Arena; 9,422 | 8–4 |
| 13 | 15 November | @ Brisbane | W 92–104 | Kody Stattmann (28) | Josh Bannan (12) | Will Magnay (5) | Brisbane Entertainment Centre; 4,669 | 9–4 |
| 14 | 21 November | Illawarra | | | | | Derwent Entertainment Centre | – |

December: 0–0 (Home: 0–0; Road: 0–0)

| Game | Date | Team | Score | High points | High rebounds | High assists | Location Attendance | Record |
|---|---|---|---|---|---|---|---|---|
| 15 | | | | | | | | – |
| 16 | | | | | | | | – |
| 17 | | | | | | | | – |
| 18 | | | | | | | | – |
| 19 | | | | | | | | – |
| 20 | | | | | | | | – |

January: 0–0 (Home: 0–0; Road: 0–0)

| Game | Date | Team | Score | High points | High rebounds | High assists | Location Attendance | Record |
|---|---|---|---|---|---|---|---|---|
| 21 | | | | | | | | – |
| 22 | | | | | | | | – |
| 23 | | | | | | | | – |
| 24 | | | | | | | | – |
| 25 | | | | | | | | – |
| 26 | | | | | | | | – |
| 27 | | | | | | | | – |
| 28 | | | | | | | | – |
| 29 | | | | | | | | – |

February: 0–0 (Home: 0–0; Road: 0–0)

| Game | Date | Team | Score | High points | High rebounds | High assists | Location Attendance | Record |
|---|---|---|---|---|---|---|---|---|
| 30 | | | | | | | | – |
| 31 | | | | | | | | – |
| 32 | | | | | | | | – |
| 33 | | | | | | | | – |

2026–27 season schedule

=== NBL Ignite Cup ===
The NBL introduced a new finals format for the 2026–27 Ignite Cup, which will include four teams and semifinals games.

| Pos | Team | Pld | W | L | PF | PA | PP | BP | Pts | Qualification |
|---|---|---|---|---|---|---|---|---|---|---|
| 1 | New Zealand Breakers | 3 | 2 | 1 | 296 | 277 | 106.9 | 8 | 14 | Semifinals |
| 2 | Sydney Kings | 3 | 2 | 1 | 293 | 271 | 108.1 | 7 | 13 | Semifinals |
| 3 | Tasmania JackJumpers | 1 | 1 | 0 | 106 | 85 | 124.7 | 4 | 7 | Semifinals |
| 4 | S.E. Melbourne Phoenix | 2 | 1 | 1 | 211 | 216 | 97.7 | 4 | 7 | Semifinals |
| 5 | Brisbane Bullets | 3 | 1 | 2 | 272 | 303 | 89.8 | 3 | 6 | |
| 6 | Illawarra Hawks | 1 | 1 | 0 | 120 | 110 | 109.1 | 2 | 5 | |
| 7 | Melbourne United | 1 | 1 | 0 | 96 | 91 | 105.5 | 2 | 5 | |
| 8 | Perth Wildcats | 2 | 0 | 2 | 195 | 208 | 93.8 | 4 | 4 | |
| 9 | Adelaide 36ers | 1 | 0 | 1 | 91 | 96 | 94.8 | 2 | 2 | |
| 10 | Cairns Taipans | 1 | 0 | 1 | 75 | 98 | 76.5 | 0 | 0 | |

Updated to match(es) played on 18 November 2026. Source: Ignitecup.com.au

== Transactions ==
Free agency began on 17 April 2026.

== Awards ==
=== Club awards ===
- Club MVP:
- Coaches Award:
- Players Award:
- Fan Favourite:
- Defensive Player:
- Spirit of the JackJumpers:

== See also ==
- 2026–27 NBL season
- Tasmania JackJumpers
