= 2026–27 Sydney Kings season =

Australian professional basketball season

- Head coach: (Australia) Brian Goorjian
- Captain: (Australia) Xavier Cooks
- Arena: Sydney SuperDome

NBL results
- Record: 9–5 (64.3%)
- Ladder: 2nd
- Stats at NBL.com.au

Ignite Cup results
- Record: 2–1 (66.7%)
- Ladder: 2nd
- All statistics correct as of 22 November 2026.

The 2026–27 Sydney Kings season is the 38th season of the franchise in the National Basketball League (NBL).

== Roster ==
Note: Flags indicate national team eligibility at FIBA-sanctioned events. Players may hold other non-FIBA nationalities not displayed.

Sydney Kings roster
Players
Coaches

Pos.	No.	Nat.	Name	Ht.	Wt.
G	1	(United States)	Davis, Kendric (I)	1.80 m (5 ft 11 in)	83 kg (183 lb)
F	2	(United States)	Craig, Torrey (I)	1.98 m (6 ft 6 in)	95 kg (209 lb)
G/F	3	(Australia)	Robertson, Tyler	1.98 m (6 ft 6 in)	107 kg (236 lb)
G	4	(Australia)	Johnston, Will	1.90 m (6 ft 3 in)	84 kg (185 lb)
G	5	(Australia)	Hanson, Bailey (DP)	1.91 m (6 ft 3 in)
G	7	(Australia)	Stone, Jayden	1.93 m (6 ft 4 in)	84 kg (185 lb)
G	8	(Australia)	Dellavedova, Matthew	1.93 m (6 ft 4 in)	91 kg (201 lb)
C	9	(Australia)	Wessels, Harry	2.16 m (7 ft 1 in)	127 kg (280 lb)
F	10	(Australia)	Cooks, Xavier (C)	2.03 m (6 ft 8 in)	83 kg (183 lb)
F	11	(United States)	Carr, Andrew (IRP)	2.11 m (6 ft 11 in)	107 kg (236 lb)
F	13	(Australia)	Machar, Peitok (DP)	2.08 m (6 ft 10 in)	98 kg (216 lb)
F/C	14	(Australia)	Spurgin, Jason	2.11 m (6 ft 11 in)	113 kg (249 lb)
F	15	(South Sudan)	Maluach, Makuach	1.96 m (6 ft 5 in)	89 kg (196 lb)
F	22	(Australia)	Bofinger, Lachlan (NRP)	2.01 m (6 ft 7 in)	100 kg (220 lb)
F	34	(Australia)	Leaupepe, Keli (injured)	1.98 m (6 ft 6 in)	108 kg (238 lb)

Head coach

- (Australia) Brian Goorjian

Assistant coach(es)

- (Australia) Andrew Bogut
- (Australia) Shaun Roger
- (Australia) Bill Tomlinson

Legend

- (C) Team captain
- (DP) Development player
- (IN) Inactive
- (I) Import player
- (SRP) Special restricted player
- (IRP) Injury replacement player
- (NRP) Nominated replacement player
- (NS) Next Star player
- Injured

- Roster
Updated: 11 September 2026

=== Depth chart ===
Pos.	Starting 5	Bench 1	Bench 2	Injured
PG	Matthew Dellavedova	Tyler Robertson
SG	Kendric Davis (I)	Makuach Maluach
SF	Torrey Craig (I)
PF	Xavier Cooks			Keli Leaupepe (injured)
C			Jason Spurgin

== Standings ==
=== Ladder ===
Pos	2026–27 NBL season											
Pos	Team	Pld	W	L	PCT	Last 5	Streak	Home	Away	PF	PA	PP
1	Tasmania JackJumpers	14	10	4	71.43%	4–1	W2	6–2	4–2	1326	1257	105.49%
2	Sydney Kings	14	9	5	64.29%	3–2	L1	6–2	3–3	1386	1281	108.20%
3	Cairns Taipans	16	10	6	62.50%	4–1	W4	5–2	5–4	1486	1525	97.44%
4	Melbourne United	15	9	6	60.00%	4–1	W2	5–3	4–3	1470	1378	106.68%
5	Adelaide 36ers	14	7	7	50.00%	3–2	L1	3–3	4–4	1305	1305	100.00%
6	Perth Wildcats	14	7	7	50.00%	2–3	L1	7–4	0–3	1334	1369	97.44%
7	Brisbane Bullets	15	7	8	46.67%	2–3	W1	5–3	2–5	1436	1493	96.18%
8	Illawarra Hawks	17	6	11	35.29%	2–3	L1	2–4	4–7	1647	1763	93.42%
9	S.E. Melbourne Phoenix	15	5	10	33.33%	1–4	L1	3–5	2–5	1466	1466	100.00%
10	New Zealand Breakers	16	5	11	31.25%	1–4	L3	3–2	2–9	1456	1475	98.71%

Updated to match(es) played on 22 November 2026. Source: NBL.com.au

The NBL tie-breaker system as outlined in the NBL Rules and Regulations states that in the case of an identical win–loss record, the overall points percentage will determine order of seeding.

=== Ladder progression ===
Leader and qualification to semifinals
Qualification to semifinals
Qualification to play-in
Last place

2026–27 NBL season
Team ╲ Round	1	2	3	4	5	6	7	8	9	10	11	12	13	14	15	16	17	18	19	20	21
Adelaide 36ers	4	3	7	7	6	9	7	5	5	5											
Brisbane Bullets	3	2	5	8	5	5	6	6	7	7											
Cairns Taipans	9	9	8	4	7	4	5	4	4	3											
Illawarra Hawks	8	10	10	10	10	10	10	10	9	8											
Melbourne United	7	5	9	6	8	7	4	3	3	4											
New Zealand Breakers	6	7	4	5	4	8	9	9	8	10											
Perth Wildcats	10	4	3	2	3	2	3	7	6	6											
S.E. Melbourne Phoenix	5	8	6	9	9	6	8	8	10	9											
Sydney Kings	1	1	1	3	2	3	1	1	1	2											
Tasmania JackJumpers	2	6	2	1	1	1	2	2	2	1											

Updated to match(es) played on 22 November 2026. Source: NBL.com.au

== Game log ==
=== Pre-season ===
The 2026 NBL Blitz will run from 2–6 September 2026 with games being played at the Bendigo Stadium, Bendigo.

2026 NBL Blitz game log
Total: 1–1 (Home: 0–1; Road: 1–0)
September: 1–1 (Home: 0–1; Road: 1–0)

Game	Date	Team	Score	High points	High rebounds	High assists	Location Attendance	Record
1	2 September	S.E. Melbourne	L 84–101	Cooks, Stone (15)	Xavier Cooks (7)	Will Johnston (9)	Bendigo Stadium n/a	0–1
2	4 September	@ New Zealand	W 74–95	Makuach Maluach (22)	Andrew Carr (8)	three players (3)	Bendigo Stadium n/a	1–1

=== Regular season ===
The regular season will begin on 19 September 2026. It will consist of 165 games (33 games each) spread across 21 rounds, with the final game being played on 14 February 2027.

2026–27 game log
Total: 9–4 (Home: 6–2; Road: 3–2)
September: 3–0 (Home: 3–0; Road: 0–0)

Game	Date	Team	Score	High points	High rebounds	High assists	Location Attendance	Record
1	20 September	Cairns	W 111–90	Kendric Davis (26)	Xavier Cooks (7)	Davis, Dellavedova (6)	Sydney SuperDome; 13,632	1–0
2	27 September	Illawarra	W 121–100	Kendric Davis (31)	Andrew Carr (12)	Kendric Davis (6)	Sydney SuperDome; 9,402	2–0
3	30 September	Brisbane	W 93–78	Kendric Davis (24)	Kendric Davis (8)	Kendric Davis (7)	Sydney SuperDome; 8,031	3–0

October: 4–3 (Home: 1–2; Road: 3–1)

Game	Date	Team	Score	High points	High rebounds	High assists	Location Attendance	Record
4	11 October	Adelaide	L 78–84	Xavier Cooks (22)	Craig, Cooks (8)	Kendric Davis (7)	Sydney SuperDome; 13,365	3–1
5	14 October	New Zealand	L 101–102	Torrey Craig (28)	Andrew Carr (10)	Kendric Davis (11)	AIS Arena; 4,103	3–2
6	17 October	Perth	W 102–81	Torrey Craig (26)	Torrey Craig (12)	Kendric Davis (8)	Sydney SuperDome; 8,032	4–2
7	22 October	@ Illawarra	W 82–108	Kendric Davis (23)	Andrew Carr (20)	Kendric Davis (14)	Wollongong Entertainment Centre; 3,987	5–2
8	25 October	@ Melbourne	L 105–95	Torrey Craig (22)	Torrey Craig (13)	Xavier Cooks (6)	John Cain Arena; 8,523	5–3
9	28 October	@ Perth	W 91–99	Torrey Craig (26)	Andrew Carr (8)	Kendric Davis (9)	Perth Arena; 10,095	6–3
10	30 October	@ Tasmania	W 68–71	Kendric Davis (20)	Torrey Craig (7)	Kendric Davis (9)	Derwent Entertainment Centre; 3,260	7–3

November: 2–1 (Home: 2–0; Road: 0–1)

Game	Date	Team	Score	High points	High rebounds	High assists	Location Attendance	Record
11	8 November	S.E. Melbourne	W 110–99	Kendric Davis (28)	Xavier Cooks (14)	Kendric Davis (9)	Sydney SuperDome; 11,123	8–3
12	13 November	@ Cairns	L 84–82	Kendric Davis (23)	Andrew Carr (10)	Kendric Davis (7)	Cairns Convention Centre; 4,016	8–4
13	15 November	New Zealand	W 111–102 (2OT)	Kendric Davis (36)	Torrey Craig (11)	Kendric Davis (9)	Sydney SuperDome; 10,183	9–4
14	22 November	@ Brisbane					Brisbane Entertainment Centre	–

December: 0–0 (Home: 0–0; Road: 0–0)

Game	Date	Team	Score	High points	High rebounds	High assists	Location Attendance	Record
15								–
16								–
17								–
18								–
19								–
20								–
21								–

January: 0–0 (Home: 0–0; Road: 0–0)

Game	Date	Team	Score	High points	High rebounds	High assists	Location Attendance	Record
22								–
23								–
24								–
25								–
26								–
27								–
28								–
29								–
30								–

February: 0–0 (Home: 0–0; Road: 0–0)

Game	Date	Team	Score	High points	High rebounds	High assists	Location Attendance	Record
31								–
32								–
33								–

2026–27 season schedule

=== NBL Ignite Cup ===
The NBL introduced a new finals format for the 2026–27 Ignite Cup, which will include four teams and semifinals games.

Pos	Team	Pld	W	L	PF	PA	PP	BP	Pts	Qualification
1	New Zealand Breakers	3	2	1	296	277	106.9	8	14	Semifinals
2	Sydney Kings	3	2	1	293	271	108.1	7	13	Semifinals
3	Tasmania JackJumpers	1	1	0	106	85	124.7	4	7	Semifinals
4	S.E. Melbourne Phoenix	2	1	1	211	216	97.7	4	7	Semifinals
5	Brisbane Bullets	3	1	2	272	303	89.8	3	6	
6	Illawarra Hawks	1	1	0	120	110	109.1	2	5	
7	Melbourne United	1	1	0	96	91	105.5	2	5	
8	Perth Wildcats	2	0	2	195	208	93.8	4	4	
9	Adelaide 36ers	1	0	1	91	96	94.8	2	2	
10	Cairns Taipans	1	0	1	75	98	76.5	0	0	

Updated to match(es) played on 18 November 2026. Source: Ignitecup.com.au

== Transactions ==
Free agency began on 17 April 2026.

== Awards ==
=== Club awards ===
- Club MVP:
- Defensive Player:
- Coaches Award:
- Members Player of the Year:
- Player's Player:

== See also ==
- 2026–27 NBL season
- Sydney Kings
