= 2026–27 New Zealand Breakers season =

New Zealand professional basketball season

- Head coach: (Canada) Gordon Herbert
- Captain: (United States) Parker Jackson-Cartwright
- Arena: Spark Arena

NBL results
- Record: 5–11 (31.3%)
- Ladder: 10th
- Stats at NBL.com.au

Ignite Cup results
- Record: 2–1 (66.7%)
- Ladder: 1st
- All statistics correct as of 22 November 2026.

The 2026–27 New Zealand Breakers season is the 24th season of the franchise in the National Basketball League (NBL), and their first under the leadership of head coach Gordon Herbert.

== Roster ==
Note: Flags indicate national team eligibility at FIBA-sanctioned events. Players may hold other non-FIBA nationalities not displayed.

New Zealand Breakers roster
Players
Coaches

Pos.	No.	Nat.	Name	Ht.	Wt.
F	0	(New Zealand)	Davison, Carlin	1.97 m (6 ft 6 in)	96 kg (212 lb)
G	1	(Australia)	Le Gassick, Preston	1.85 m (6 ft 1 in)	79 kg (174 lb)
G	2	(New Zealand)	Le'afa, Izayah	1.88 m (6 ft 2 in)	90 kg (198 lb)
F/C	3	(New Zealand)	Mennenga, Sam	2.06 m (6 ft 9 in)	109 kg (240 lb)
G	4	(New Zealand)	Cooper, Tukaha (DP)	1.87 m (6 ft 2 in)
G	5	(New Zealand)	Evans, Kazlo (DP)	1.80 m (5 ft 11 in)
G	6	(United States)	Jackson-Cartwright, Parker (injured) (I & C)	1.80 m (5 ft 11 in)	74 kg (163 lb)
G/F	7	(New Zealand)	Te Rangi, Reuben	1.98 m (6 ft 6 in)	105 kg (231 lb)
C	8	(Canada)	Bediako, Charles (I)	2.11 m (6 ft 11 in)	102 kg (225 lb)
G	9	(New Zealand)	King, Mojave (NRP)	1.96 m (6 ft 5 in)	88 kg (194 lb)
G	11	(Germany)	Weidemann, Nelson (I)	1.91 m (6 ft 3 in)	75 kg (165 lb)
F	12	(South Sudan)	Noi, Kouat	2.01 m (6 ft 7 in)	103 kg (227 lb)
F/C	13	(New Zealand)	Rissetto, Anzac	2.08 m (6 ft 10 in)	116 kg (256 lb)
G	17	(United States)	Mays, Skylar (IRP)	1.91 m (6 ft 3 in)	93 kg (205 lb)
G	18	(New Zealand)	Chunga, Aubrey (DP)	1.96 m (6 ft 5 in)
F	21	(New Zealand)	Robinson, Kael (DP)	2.01 m (6 ft 7 in)	100 kg (220 lb)
F	30	(United States)	James, Josiah-Jordan (injured) (I)	1.98 m (6 ft 6 in)	97 kg (214 lb)
G	34	(Australia)	Vasiljevic, Dejan	1.90 m (6 ft 3 in)	94 kg (207 lb)
G	37	(New Zealand)	Cameron, Tobias (IRP)	1.96 m (6 ft 5 in)

Head coach

- (Canada) Gordon Herbert

Assistant coach(es)

- (New Zealand) Quinn Clinton
- (Germany) Sebastian Gleim
- (New Zealand) Matt Lacey
- (New Zealand) Josiah Maama

Legend

- (C) Team captain
- (DP) Development player
- (I) Import player
- (SRP) Special restricted player
- (NS) Next Star player
- Injured

- Roster
Updated: 14 November 2026

=== Depth chart ===
Pos.	Starting 5	Bench	Development
PG	Parker Jackson-Cartwright (I)
SG	Izayah Le'afa		Tukaha Cooper (DP)
SF		Carlin Davison
PF	Reuben Te Rangi
C	Sam Mennenga

== Standings ==
=== Ladder ===
Pos	2026–27 NBL season											
Pos	Team	Pld	W	L	PCT	Last 5	Streak	Home	Away	PF	PA	PP
1	Tasmania JackJumpers	14	10	4	71.43%	4–1	W2	6–2	4–2	1326	1257	105.49%
2	Sydney Kings	14	9	5	64.29%	3–2	L1	6–2	3–3	1386	1281	108.20%
3	Cairns Taipans	16	10	6	62.50%	4–1	W4	5–2	5–4	1486	1525	97.44%
4	Melbourne United	15	9	6	60.00%	4–1	W2	5–3	4–3	1470	1378	106.68%
5	Adelaide 36ers	14	7	7	50.00%	3–2	L1	3–3	4–4	1305	1305	100.00%
6	Perth Wildcats	14	7	7	50.00%	2–3	L1	7–4	0–3	1334	1369	97.44%
7	Brisbane Bullets	15	7	8	46.67%	2–3	W1	5–3	2–5	1436	1493	96.18%
8	Illawarra Hawks	17	6	11	35.29%	2–3	L1	2–4	4–7	1647	1763	93.42%
9	S.E. Melbourne Phoenix	15	5	10	33.33%	1–4	L1	3–5	2–5	1466	1466	100.00%
10	New Zealand Breakers	16	5	11	31.25%	1–4	L3	3–2	2–9	1456	1475	98.71%

Updated to match(es) played on 22 November 2026. Source: NBL.com.au

The NBL tie-breaker system as outlined in the NBL Rules and Regulations states that in the case of an identical win–loss record, the overall points percentage will determine order of seeding.

=== Ladder progression ===
Leader and qualification to semifinals
Qualification to semifinals
Qualification to play-in
Last place

2026–27 NBL season
Team ╲ Round	1	2	3	4	5	6	7	8	9	10	11	12	13	14	15	16	17	18	19	20	21
Adelaide 36ers	4	3	7	7	6	9	7	5	5	5											
Brisbane Bullets	3	2	5	8	5	5	6	6	7	7											
Cairns Taipans	9	9	8	4	7	4	5	4	4	3											
Illawarra Hawks	8	10	10	10	10	10	10	10	9	8											
Melbourne United	7	5	9	6	8	7	4	3	3	4											
New Zealand Breakers	6	7	4	5	4	8	9	9	8	10											
Perth Wildcats	10	4	3	2	3	2	3	7	6	6											
S.E. Melbourne Phoenix	5	8	6	9	9	6	8	8	10	9											
Sydney Kings	1	1	1	3	2	3	1	1	1	2											
Tasmania JackJumpers	2	6	2	1	1	1	2	2	2	1											

Updated to match(es) played on 22 November 2026. Source: NBL.com.au

== Game log ==
=== Pre-season ===
The 2026 NBL Blitz will run from 2–6 September 2026 with games being played at the Bendigo Stadium, Bendigo.

2026 NBL Blitz game log
Total: 1–1 (Home: 0–1; Road: 1–0)
September: 1–1 (Home: 0–1; Road: 1–0)

Game	Date	Team	Score	High points	High rebounds	High assists	Location Attendance	Record
1	4 September	Sydney	L 74–95	Parker Jackson-Cartwright (15)	Parker Jackson-Cartwright (7)	Parker Jackson-Cartwright (7)	Bendigo Stadium n/a	0–1
2	6 September	@ Tasmania	W 86–96	Parker Jackson-Cartwright (23)	Charles Bediako (10)	Parker Jackson-Cartwright (8)	Bendigo Stadium n/a	1–1

=== Regular season ===
The regular season will begin on 19 September 2026. It will consist of 165 games (33 games each) spread across 21 rounds, with the final game being played on 14 February 2027.

2026–27 game log
Total: 5–10 (Home: 3–2; Road: 2–8)
September: 2–2 (Home: 2–0; Road: 0–2)

Game	Date	Team	Score	High points	High rebounds	High assists	Location Attendance	Record
1	20 September	Illawarra	W 95–81	Sam Mennenga (27)	Sam Mennenga (8)	Parker Jackson-Cartwright (13)	Spark Arena; 3,748	1–0
2	22 September	@ Brisbane	L 88–85	Parker Jackson-Cartwright (26)	Charles Bediako (8)	Parker Jackson-Cartwright (7)	Pat Rafter Arena; 5,285	1–1
3	26 September	@ Perth	L 97–93	Parker Jackson-Cartwright (30)	Carlin Davison (6)	Parker Jackson-Cartwright (8)	Perth Arena; 9,646	1–2
4	30 September	Cairns	W 98–75	Parker Jackson-Cartwright (27)	Sam Mennenga (9)	Parker Jackson-Cartwright (10)	Spark Arena; 5,187	2–2

October: 2–4 (Home: 0–1; Road: 2–3)

Game	Date	Team	Score	High points	High rebounds	High assists	Location Attendance	Record
5	4 October	@ Adelaide	W 72–88	Parker Jackson-Cartwright (27)	Parker Jackson-Cartwright (9)	Parker Jackson-Cartwright (9)	Adelaide Entertainment Centre; 10,044	3–2
6	10 October	@ Perth	L 100–84	Sam Mennenga (40)	Sam Mennenga (18)	Carlin Davison (11)	Perth Arena; 12,170	3–3
7	14 October	@ Sydney	W 101–102	Sam Mennenga (27)	Sam Mennenga (13)	Carlin Davison (14)	AIS Arena; 4,103	4–3
8	18 October	@ Tasmania	L 98–92	Sam Mennenga (36)	Sam Mennenga (11)	Carlin Davison (11)	Derwent Entertainment Centre; 4,340	4–4
9	25 October	@ Cairns	L 86–84	Sam Mennenga (22)	Charles Bediako (10)	Parker Jackson-Cartwright (9)	Cairns Convention Centre; 4,414	4–5
10	30 October	Adelaide	L 101–108	Sam Mennenga (28)	four players (5)	Carlin Davison (11)	Spark Arena; 4,492	4–6

November: 1–4 (Home: 1–1; Road: 0–3)

Game	Date	Team	Score	High points	High rebounds	High assists	Location Attendance	Record
11	2 November	@ Melbourne	L 94–74	Sam Mennenga (15)	Charles Bediako (12)	Carlin Davison (10)	John Cain Arena; 10,017	4–7
12	6 November	@ Tasmania	L 79–77	Sam Mennenga (29)	Sam Mennenga (17)	Carlin Davison (9)	Silverdome; 3,260	4–8
13	13 November	Brisbane	W 94–90 (OT)	Dejan Vasiljevic (36)	Carlin Davison (12)	Carlin Davison (13)	Spark Arena; 3,723	5–8
14	15 November	@ Sydney	L 111–102 (2OT)	Kouat Noi (32)	Charles Bediako (10)	Carlin Davison (15)	Sydney SuperDome; 10,183	5–9
15	18 November	S.E. Melbourne	L 96–101	Skylar Mays (20)	Sam Mennenga (9)	Skylar Mays (8)	Spark Arena; 3,917	5–10
16	21 November	@ Melbourne					John Cain Arena	–

December: 0–0 (Home: 0–0; Road: 0–0)

Game	Date	Team	Score	High points	High rebounds	High assists	Location Attendance	Record
17								–
18								–
19								–
20								–
21								–
22								–

January: 0–0 (Home: 0–0; Road: 0–0)

Game	Date	Team	Score	High points	High rebounds	High assists	Location Attendance	Record
23								–
24								–
25								–
26								–
27								–
28								–
29								–

February: 0–0 (Home: 0–0; Road: 0–0)

Game	Date	Team	Score	High points	High rebounds	High assists	Location Attendance	Record
30								–
31								–
32								–
33								–

2026–27 season schedule

=== NBL Ignite Cup ===
The NBL introduced a new finals format for the 2026–27 Ignite Cup, which will include four teams and semifinals games.

Pos	Team	Pld	W	L	PF	PA	PP	BP	Pts	Qualification
1	New Zealand Breakers	3	2	1	296	277	106.9	8	14	Semifinals
2	Sydney Kings	3	2	1	293	271	108.1	7	13	Semifinals
3	Tasmania JackJumpers	1	1	0	106	85	124.7	4	7	Semifinals
4	S.E. Melbourne Phoenix	2	1	1	211	216	97.7	4	7	Semifinals
5	Brisbane Bullets	3	1	2	272	303	89.8	3	6	
6	Illawarra Hawks	1	1	0	120	110	109.1	2	5	
7	Melbourne United	1	1	0	96	91	105.5	2	5	
8	Perth Wildcats	2	0	2	195	208	93.8	4	4	
9	Adelaide 36ers	1	0	1	91	96	94.8	2	2	
10	Cairns Taipans	1	0	1	75	98	76.5	0	0	

Updated to match(es) played on 18 November 2026. Source: Ignitecup.com.au

== Transactions ==
Free agency began on 17 April 2026.

== Awards ==
=== Club awards ===
- Club MVP:
- Fan's Memorable Moment:
- Defensive Player:
- Member’s Choice Award:
- Clubman Award:
- Blackwell Community Cup:

== See also ==
- 2026–27 NBL season
- New Zealand Breakers
