= Jaylin Williams =

Jaylin Williams may refer to:

- Jaylin Williams (gridiron football) (born 2000), American football cornerback, played for Indiana
- Jaylin Williams (basketball, born 2000), American basketball player for the Saskatoon Mamba, played for Auburn
- Jaylin Williams (basketball, born 2002), American basketball player for the Oklahoma City Thunder, played for Arkansas

== See also ==
- Jalen Williams (born 2001), American basketball player
