= Tanner Krebs =

Australian basketball player (born 1996)

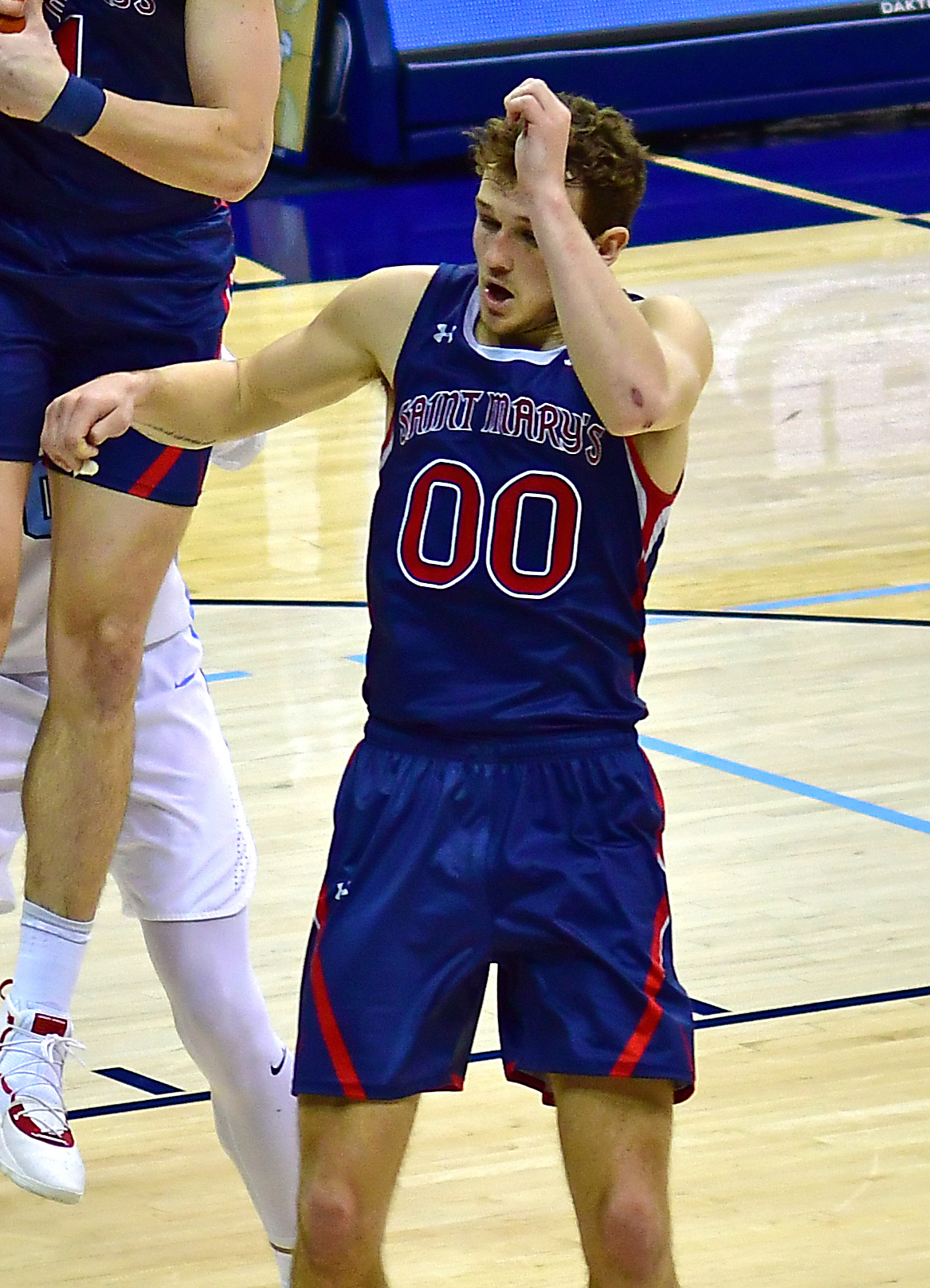
- Krebs in March 2019

No. 13 – South East Melbourne Phoenix
- Position: Shooting guard
- League: NBL

Personal information
- Born: 4 January 1996 (age 30) Naples, Florida, U.S.
- Listed height: 198 cm (6 ft 6 in)
- Listed weight: 95 kg (209 lb)

Career information
- High school: Lake Ginninderra College (Canberra, Australia)
- College: Saint Mary's (2016–2020)
- NBA draft: 2020: undrafted
- Playing career: 2012–present

Career history
- 2012–2013: Hobart Chargers
- 2014–2015: BA Centre of Excellence
- 2020: South West Metro Pirates
- 2020–2023: Brisbane Bullets
- 2021: USC Rip City
- 2022–2023: Gold Coast Rollers
- 2023–2026: Melbourne United
- 2024: Sandringham Sabres
- 2025: Ringwood Hawks
- 2026: Casey Cavaliers
- 2026–present: South East Melbourne Phoenix

Career highlights
- NBL1 North champion (2022); NBL1 South All-Star Five (2024)
Medals
Men's basketball
Representing Australia
Universiade
Bronze medal – third place	2019 Italy	Team

Tanner Robert Krebs (born 4 January 1996) is an Australian professional basketball player for the South East Melbourne Phoenix of the National Basketball League (NBL). He played college basketball for the Saint Mary's Gaels.

== Early life and career ==
Krebs was born in Naples, Florida, in Collier County. He moved to Australia when he was two and grew up in Hobart, Tasmania. He attended Lake Ginninderra College in Canberra and played for the Rats basketball team.

In 2012 and 2013, Krebs played for the Hobart Chargers in the South East Australian Basketball League (SEABL). In 2014 and 2015, he played for the BA Centre of Excellence in the SEABL.

== College career ==
Krebs redshirted his true freshman season. He struggled with his shooting as a redshirt freshman, but shot 4-of-4 from behind the arc against San Diego on 31 December 2016. On 9 December 2017, Krebs made five 3-pointers and finished with 23 points in a 97–73 win over Seattle. He posted 7.7 points and 5.2 rebounds per game as a sophomore. As a junior, Krebs averaged 8.9 points, 3.7 rebounds, and 0.8 assists per game. Krebs scored a season-high 20 points on 23 November 2019, in a 77–66 win against Lehigh. As a senior, Krebs averaged 9.1 points and 3.9 rebounds per game, shooting 39.1 percent from behind the arc.

== Professional career ==
=== NBL ===
On 16 July 2020, Krebs signed with the Brisbane Bullets of the National Basketball League.

On 11 April 2023, Krebs signed a three-year deal with Melbourne United.

On 4 December 2025, Krebs scored 25 of his career-high 29 points in the first half of United's 96–84 loss to the Perth Wildcats.

On 5 May 2026, Krebs signed a two-year deal with the South East Melbourne Phoenix. In June 2026, he suffered a stress reaction in his lower leg while playing in the NBL1, which ruled him out for the start of the Phoenix's pre-season. In the Phoenix's season opener on 19 September, he scored an equal game-high 25 points in a 100–79 win over the Perth Wildcats.

=== State Leagues ===
Krebs played for the South West Metro Pirates in the 2020 Queensland State League (QSL).

In 2021, Krebs played for the USC Rip City in the NBL1 North. He continued in the NBL1 North in 2022 and 2023 with the Gold Coast Rollers.

In 2024, Krebs was named in the NBL1 South All-Star Five with the Sandringham Sabres.

Krebs joined the Ringwood Hawks for the 2025 NBL1 South season.

Krebs joined the Casey Cavaliers for the 2026 NBL1 South season.

== National team career ==
Krebs has represented Australia at several international tournaments. He averaged 15.5 points, 3.7 rebounds, and 2.2 assists per game at the 2014 FIBA Under-18 Oceania Championship. At the 2015 FIBA Under-19 World Championship in Heraklion, he averaged 7.9 points, 2.2 rebounds, and 1.1 assists per game. He scored 31 points in the seventh-place game, a 103–72 win over Spain.

In August 2017, Krebs was selected to represent Australia at the Summer Universiade in Taipei. Two years later, he represented Australia at the 2019 Summer Universiade in Italy. He helped the team win bronze, averaging 8.8 points and 3.3 rebounds per game and scoring a personal-best 13 points against Argentina.

In February 2026, Krebs was named in the Australian Boomers squad for two FIBA World Cup Asian qualifiers. In August 2026, he was named in the squad for two more Asian qualifiers.

== Career statistics ==
Legend
GP	Games played	GS	Games started	MPG	Minutes per game
FG%	Field goal percentage	3P%	3-point field goal percentage	FT%	Free throw percentage
RPG	Rebounds per game	APG	Assists per game	SPG	Steals per game
BPG	Blocks per game	PPG	Points per game	**Bold**	Career high

=== College ===
Year	Team	GP	GS	MPG	FG%	3P%	FT%	RPG	APG	SPG	BPG	PPG
2015–16	Saint Mary's	Redshirt										
2016–17	Saint Mary's	32	0	12.8	.381	.364	.864	1.5	.3	.2	.0	4.3
2017–18	Saint Mary's	**36**	29	27.6	.424	.396	.833	**5.2**	**1.0**	.5	**.4**	7.7
2018–19	Saint Mary's	34	25	**30.3**	**.439**	**.398**	**.868**	3.7	.8	.6	.2	8.9
2019–20	Saint Mary's	33	**33**	30.2	.415	.391	.854	3.9	.8	**1.0**	.3	**9.1**
Career		135	87	25.4	.420	.390	.853	3.6	.7	.6	.2	7.5

== Personal life ==
Krebs is the son of Dan Krebs, who played professional basketball in Australia.
