= NBL Ignite Cup =

In-season competition

- Current season, competition or edition: 2026–27 NBL Ignite Cup
- Sport: Basketball
- Founded: 18 June 2025; 15 months ago
- Organising body: National Basketball League
- No. of teams: 10
- Countries: Australia (9 teams); New Zealand (1 team)
- Continent: FIBA Oceania (Oceania)
- Most recent champion: New Zealand Breakers (1st title)
- Most titles: New Zealand Breakers (1 title)
- Broadcasters: ESPN/Foxtel, Sky Sport
- Streaming partners: Disney+, Kayo Sports, Sky Sport Now, NBL TV
- Sponsor: Hungry Jack's
- Website: Ignitecup.com.au

The National Basketball League Ignite Cup, often shortened to the NBL Ignite Cup, is an annual cup competition for the Australian National Basketball League (NBL).

== History ==
On 18 June 2025, the Australian National Basketball League established the first NBL Ignite Cup, similar to the 2021 NBL Cup.

All ten NBL teams participated in the inaugural tournament, which took place from 8 October 2025 to 22 February 2026. Ignite Cup games are held on Wednesday evenings during the NBL regular season.

In the 2025–26 season, teams received one point for every quarter they won or half a point each if tied, and three points for winning the game. Each team played two home games and two road games. The two highest-ranked teams based on both points advanced to the Ignite Cup Final. The winning team received $300,000 AUD, while the runner-up received $100,000 AUD. 60 percent went directly to the players, with the remaining 40 percent went to the clubs.

All games excluding the Final counted towards the team's regular season record.

On 22 February 2026, the New Zealand Breakers won the inaugural NBL Ignite Cup Final, defeating the Adelaide 36ers 111–107 and claimed $300,000 prize money. Parker Jackson-Cartwright was named the Ignite Cup Final Player of the Game.

In August 2026, a new finals format was revealed for the 2026–27 Ignite Cup, which will include four teams and semifinals games.

== Format ==
The tournament has a similar format to in-season, multi-stage tournaments such as NBL Cup and those held in association football. The tournament rules are as follows:

- 20 extra games.
- Wednesday night prime-time.
- New points system: Every quarter counts.
- Record prize money – $550,000 up for grabs.
- Players receive 60% of winnings.
- Every game impacts the regular season.

== See also ==
- Basketball in Australia
- Basketball in New Zealand
- National Basketball League
- NBL Finals
- NBL Cup
