= 2020 NCAA Men's Basketball All-Americans =

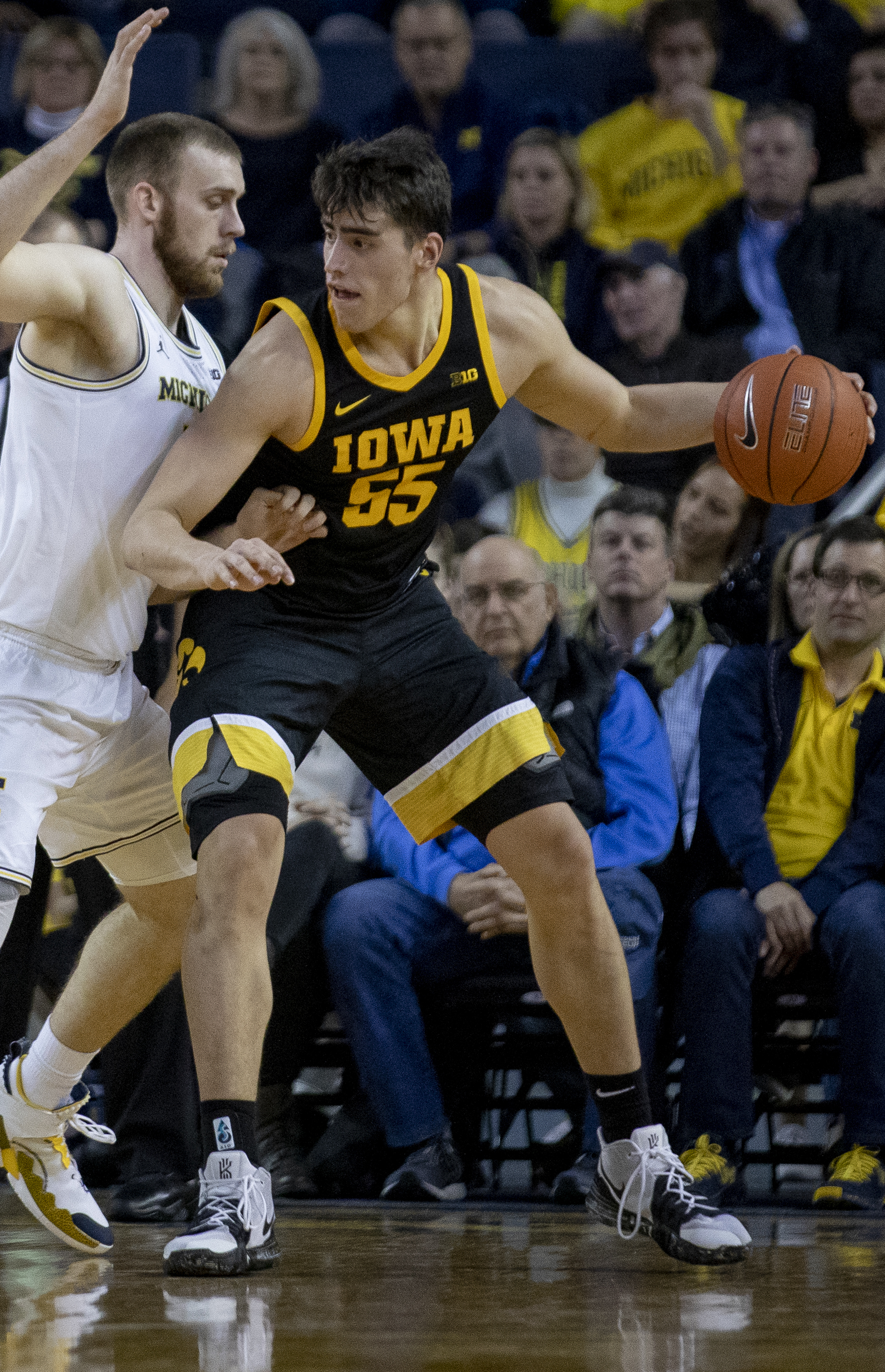
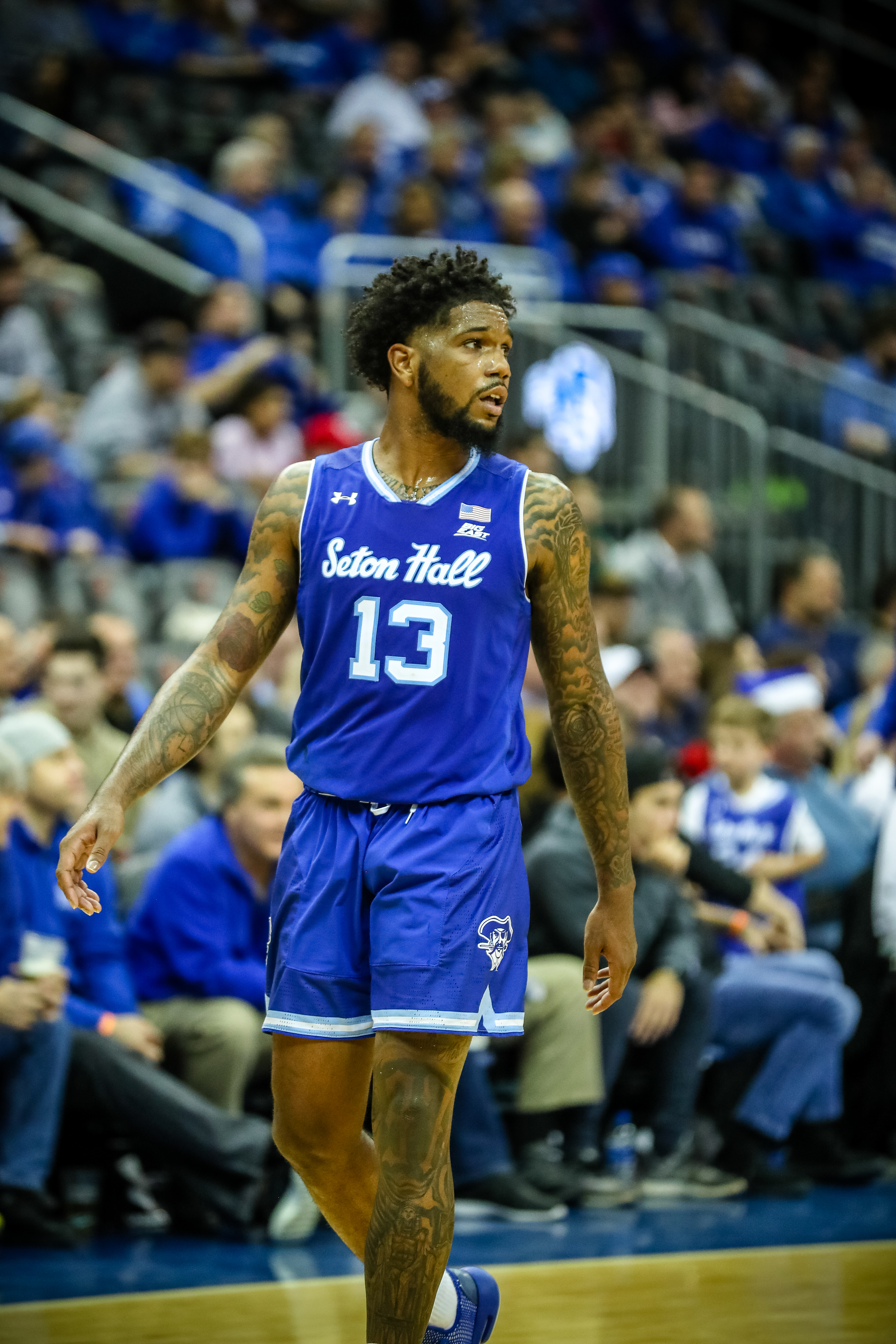
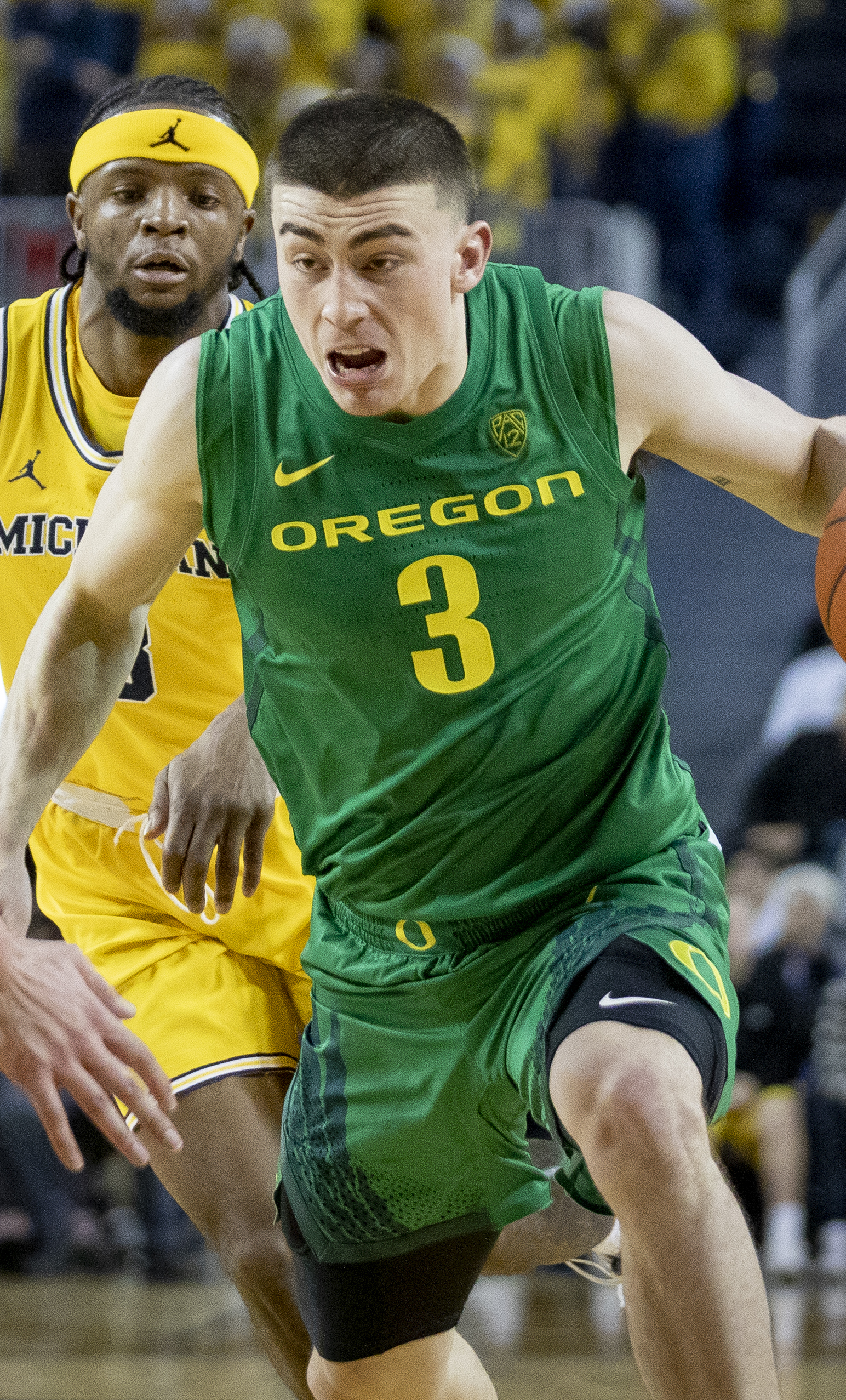
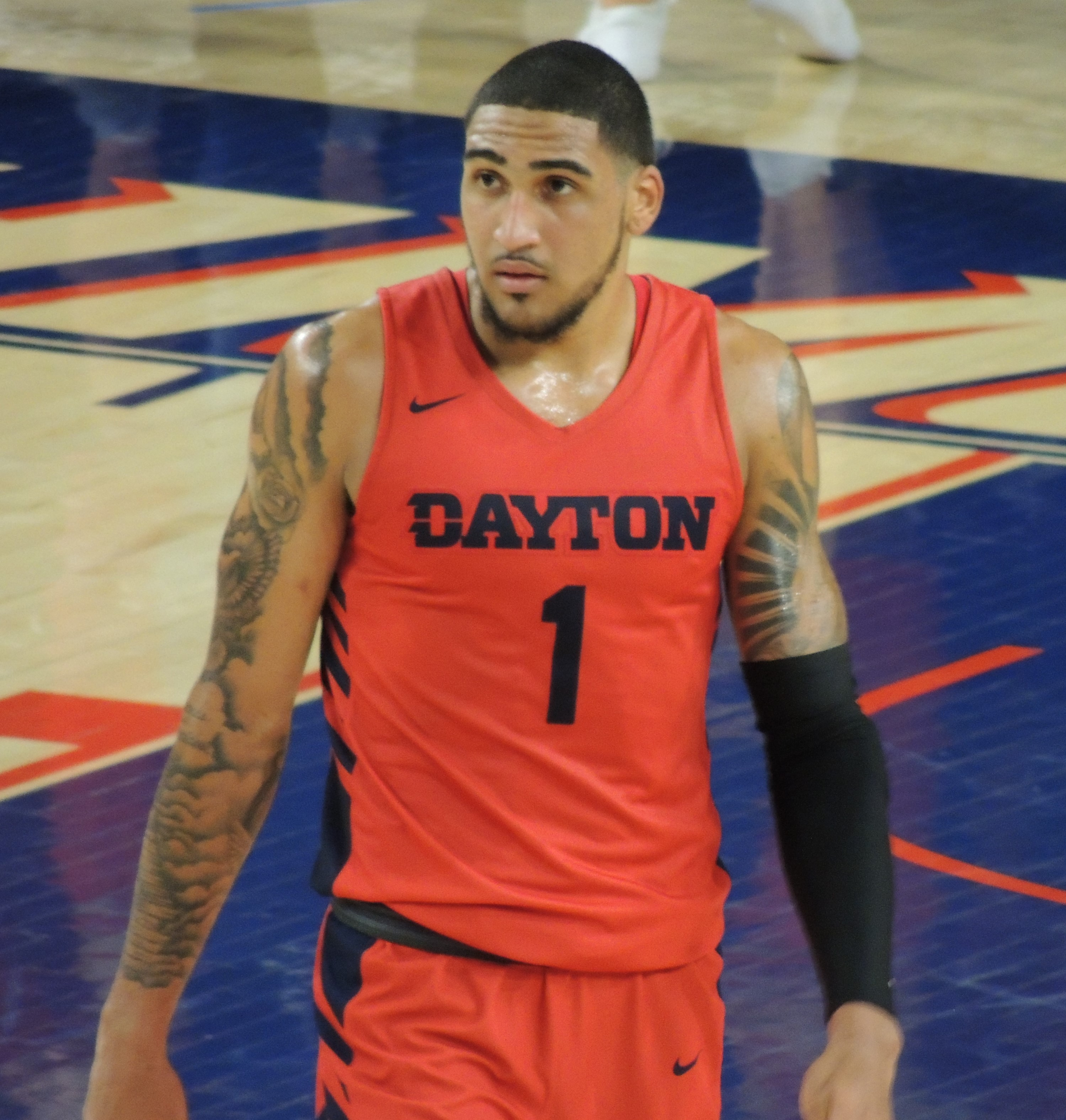
- Members of the 2020 Consensus All-America first team. Clockwise from upper left: Garza, Powell, Toppin and Pritchard (not pictured: Howard).
- Awarded for: 2019–20 NCAA Division I men's basketball season

An All-American team is an honorary sports team composed of the best amateur players of a specific season for each team position—who in turn are given the honorific "All-America" and typically referred to as "All-American athletes", or simply "All-Americans". Although the honorees generally do not compete together as a unit, the term is used in U.S. team sports to refer to players who are selected by members of the national media. Walter Camp selected the first All-America team in the early days of American football in 1889. The 2020 NCAA Men's Basketball All-Americans are honorary lists that include All-American selections from the Associated Press (AP), the United States Basketball Writers Association (USBWA), the Sporting News (TSN), and the National Association of Basketball Coaches (NABC) for the 2019–20 NCAA Division I men's basketball season. All selectors choose three teams, while AP also lists honorable mention selections.

The Consensus 2020 College Basketball All-American team was determined by aggregating the results of the four major All-American teams as determined by the National Collegiate Athletic Association (NCAA). Since United Press International was replaced by TSN in 1997, the four major selectors have been the aforementioned ones. AP has been a selector since 1948, NABC since 1957 and USBWA since 1960. To earn "consensus" status, a player must win honors based on a point system computed from the four different all-America teams. The point system consists of three points for first team, two points for second team and one point for third team. No honorable mention or fourth team or lower are used in the computation. The top five totals plus ties are first team and the next five plus ties are second team.

Although the aforementioned lists are used to determine consensus honors, there are numerous other All-American lists. The ten finalists for the John Wooden Award are described as Wooden All-Americans. The ten finalists for the Senior CLASS Award are described as Senior All-Americans. Other All-American lists include those determined by USA Today, Fox Sports, Yahoo! Sports and many others. The scholar-athletes selected by College Sports Information Directors of America (CoSIDA) are termed Academic All-Americans.

== 2020 Consensus All-America team ==
PG – Point guard
SG – Shooting guard
PF – Power forward
SF – Small forward
C – Center

Consensus First Team
Player	Position	Class	Team
Luka Garza	C	Junior	Iowa
Markus Howard	PG	Senior	Marquette
Myles Powell	PG/SG	Senior	Seton Hall
Payton Pritchard	PG	Senior	Oregon
Obi Toppin	PF	Sophomore	Dayton

Consensus Second Team
Player	Position	Class	Team
Udoka Azubuike	C	Senior	Kansas
Vernon Carey Jr.	PF	Freshman	Duke
Devon Dotson	PG	Sophomore	Kansas
Malachi Flynn	PG/SG	Junior	San Diego State
Cassius Winston	PG	Senior	Michigan State

== Individual All-America teams ==
=== By player ===
Player	School	AP	USBWA	NABC	SN	CP	Notes
Luka Garza	Iowa	1	1	1	1	12	Sporting News Player of the Year, Pete Newell Big Man Award, Kareem Abdul-Jabbar Award
Markus Howard	Marquette	1	1	1	1	12	Senior CLASS Award
Obi Toppin	Dayton	1	1	1	1	12	John R. Wooden Award, AP Player of the Year, Oscar Robertson Trophy, NABC Player of the Year, Naismith Player of the Year, Karl Malone Award
Myles Powell	Seton Hall	1	1	2	1	11	Jerry West Award
Payton Pritchard	Oregon	1	2	1	1	11	Lute Olson Award, Bob Cousy Award
Udoka Azubuike	Kansas	2	1	1	2	10	NABC Defensive Player of the Year
Devon Dotson	Kansas	2	2	2	2	8	
Malachi Flynn	San Diego State	2	2	2	2	8	
Cassius Winston	Michigan State	2	2	2	2	8	
Vernon Carey Jr.	Duke	2	2	3	2	7	USBWA Freshman of the Year, NABC Freshman of the Year
Filip Petrušev	Gonzaga	3	3	2	3	5	
Jared Butler	Baylor	3	3	3	3	4	
Jordan Nwora	Louisville	3	3	3	3	4	
Jalen Smith	Maryland	3	3	3	3	4	
Tre Jones	Duke	3	3	3		3	
Daniel Oturu	Minnesota				3	1	

=== By team ===
All-America Team
All-America Team	First team		Second team		Third team	
All-America Team	Player	School	Player	School	Player	School
Associated Press	Luka Garza	Iowa	Udoka Azubuike	Kansas	Jared Butler	Baylor
Associated Press	Markus Howard	Marquette	Vernon Carey Jr.	Duke	Tre Jones	Duke
Associated Press	Myles Powell	Seton Hall	Devon Dotson	Kansas	Jordan Nwora	Louisville
Associated Press	Payton Pritchard	Oregon	Malachi Flynn	San Diego State	Filip Petrušev	Gonzaga
Associated Press	Obi Toppin	Dayton	Cassius Winston	Michigan State	Jalen Smith	Maryland
USBWA	Udoka Azubuike	Kansas	Vernon Carey Jr.	Duke	Jared Butler	Baylor
USBWA	Luka Garza	Iowa	Devon Dotson	Kansas	Tre Jones	Duke
USBWA	Markus Howard	Marquette	Malachi Flynn	San Diego State	Jordan Nwora	Louisville
USBWA	Myles Powell	Seton Hall	Payton Pritchard	Oregon	Filip Petrušev	Gonzaga
USBWA	Obi Toppin	Dayton	Cassius Winston	Michigan State	Jalen Smith	Maryland
NABC	Udoka Azubuike	Kansas	Devon Dotson	Kansas	Jared Butler	Baylor
NABC	Luka Garza	Iowa	Malachi Flynn	San Diego State	Vernon Carey Jr.	Duke
NABC	Markus Howard	Marquette	Filip Petrušev	Gonzaga	Tre Jones	Duke
NABC	Payton Pritchard	Oregon	Myles Powell	Seton Hall	Jordan Nwora	Louisville
NABC	Obi Toppin	Dayton	Cassius Winston	Michigan State	Jalen Smith	Maryland
Sporting News
Sporting News	Luka Garza	Iowa	Udoka Azubuike	Kansas	Jared Butler	Baylor
Sporting News	Markus Howard	Marquette	Vernon Carey Jr.	Duke	Jordan Nwora	Louisville
Sporting News	Myles Powell	Seton Hall	Devon Dotson	Kansas	Daniel Oturu	Minnesota
Sporting News	Payton Pritchard	Oregon	Malachi Flynn	San Diego State	Filip Petrušev	Gonzaga
Sporting News	Obi Toppin	Dayton	Cassius Winston	Michigan State	Jalen Smith	Maryland

AP Honorable Mention:

- Saddiq Bey, Villanova
- Mason Jones, Arkansas
- Daniel Oturu, Minnesota
- Immanuel Quickley, Kentucky
- Marcus Zegarowski, Creighton

== Academic All-Americans ==
The College Sports Information Directors of America (CoSIDA) announced its 15-member 2020 Academic All-America team on March 9, 2020, divided into first, second and third teams with Skylar Mays of LSU chosen as men's college basketball Academic All-American of the Year.

First Team
Player	School	Class	GPA and major
Skylar Mays (Note: First-team selection in 2018–19 and second-team in 2017–18.)	LSU	Sr.	3.93, Kinesiology/Human Movement
Brooks DeBisschop (Note: Third-team selection in 2018–19.)	Northern Arizona	Sr.	3.97, Finance
Christian Lutete	UMass Lowell	GS	3.79/4.00, Economics (UG) / Peace & Conflict Studies (G)
Mason Peatling	Eastern Washington	GS	3.89/4.00, Finance (UG) / MBA (G)
Matt Pile	Omaha	Jr.	3.93, Chemistry

Second Team
Player	School	Class	GPA and major
Jimmy Boeheim	Cornell	Jr.	3.76, Applied Economics & Management
Đorđe Dimitrijević	Mercer	Sr.	3.87, Computer Science
James Foye (Note: Second-team selection in 2018–19.)	Dartmouth	Sr.	3.97, Economics
Sam Merrill	Utah State	Sr.	3.39, Business Administration
Jordan Nwora	Louisville	Jr.	3.40, Exercise Science
Xavier Tillman	Michigan State	Jr.	3.63, Communication

Third Team
Player	School	Class	GPA and major
Amidou Bamba (Note: Third-team selection in 2018–19 at Central Connecticut.)	Charlotte	GS	3.98/4.00, Finance (UG) / MBA (G)
Trent Forrest	Florida State	GS	3.43, Sport Management (UG & G)
T. J. Haws	BYU	Sr.	3.46, Finance
Davide Moretti	Texas Tech	Jr.	3.68, Human Science

== Senior All-Americans ==
The 10 finalists for the Senior CLASS Award, called Senior All-Americans, were announced on February 5, 2020. On March 31, Markus Howard was announced as the recipient, with the first and second teams also announced at that time.

=== First team ===
Player	Position	School
Markus Howard	Guard	Marquette
Udoka Azubuike	Center	Kansas
Sam Merrill	Guard	Utah State
Myles Powell	Guard	Seton Hall
Cassius Winston	Guard	Michigan State

=== Second team ===
Player	Position	School
Yoeli Childs	Forward	BYU
James Foye	Guard	Dartmouth
Nathan Knight	Center	William & Mary
Skylar Mays	Guard	LSU
Lamar Stevens	Forward	Penn State
