= 2019 NCAA Men's Basketball All-Americans =

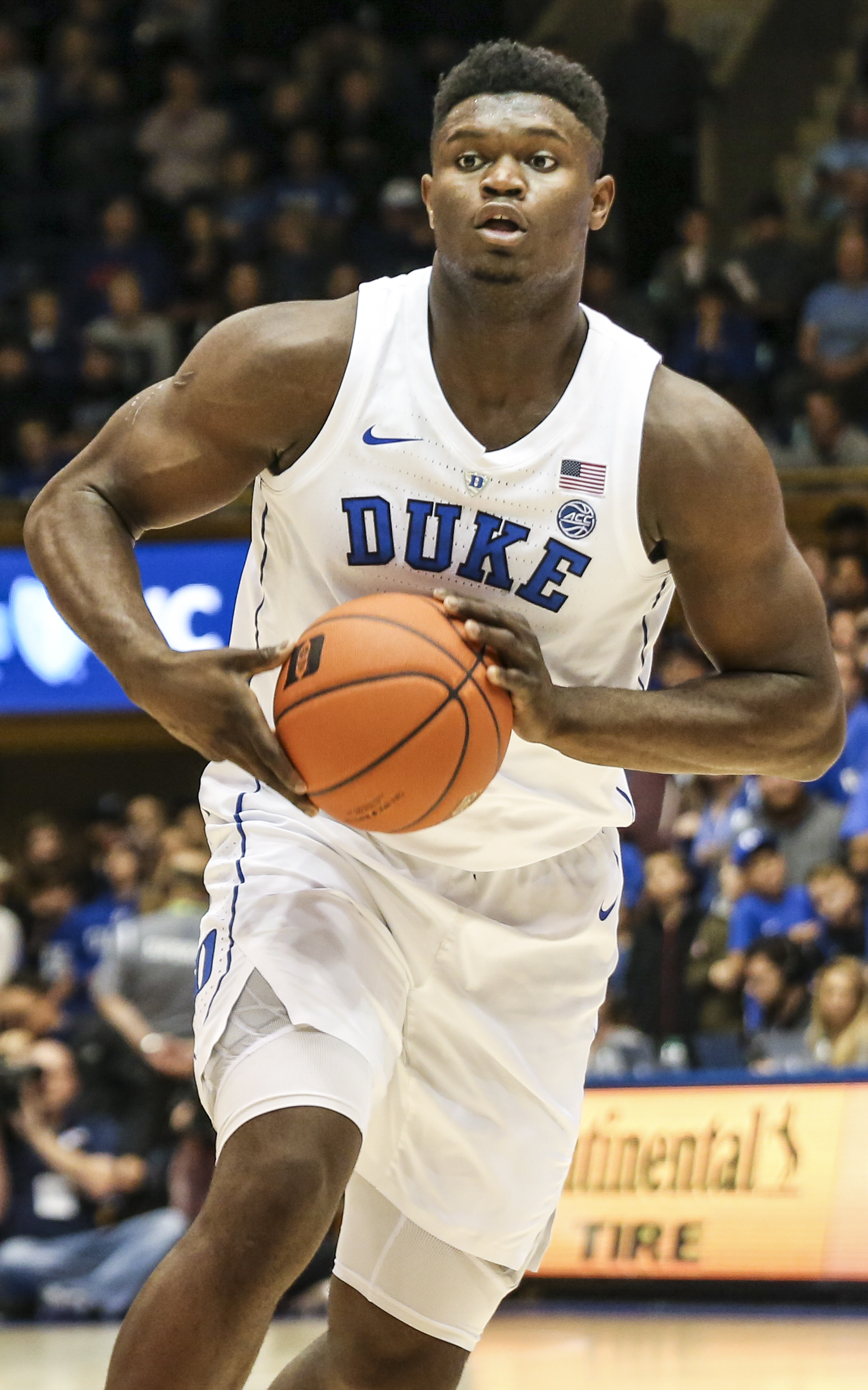
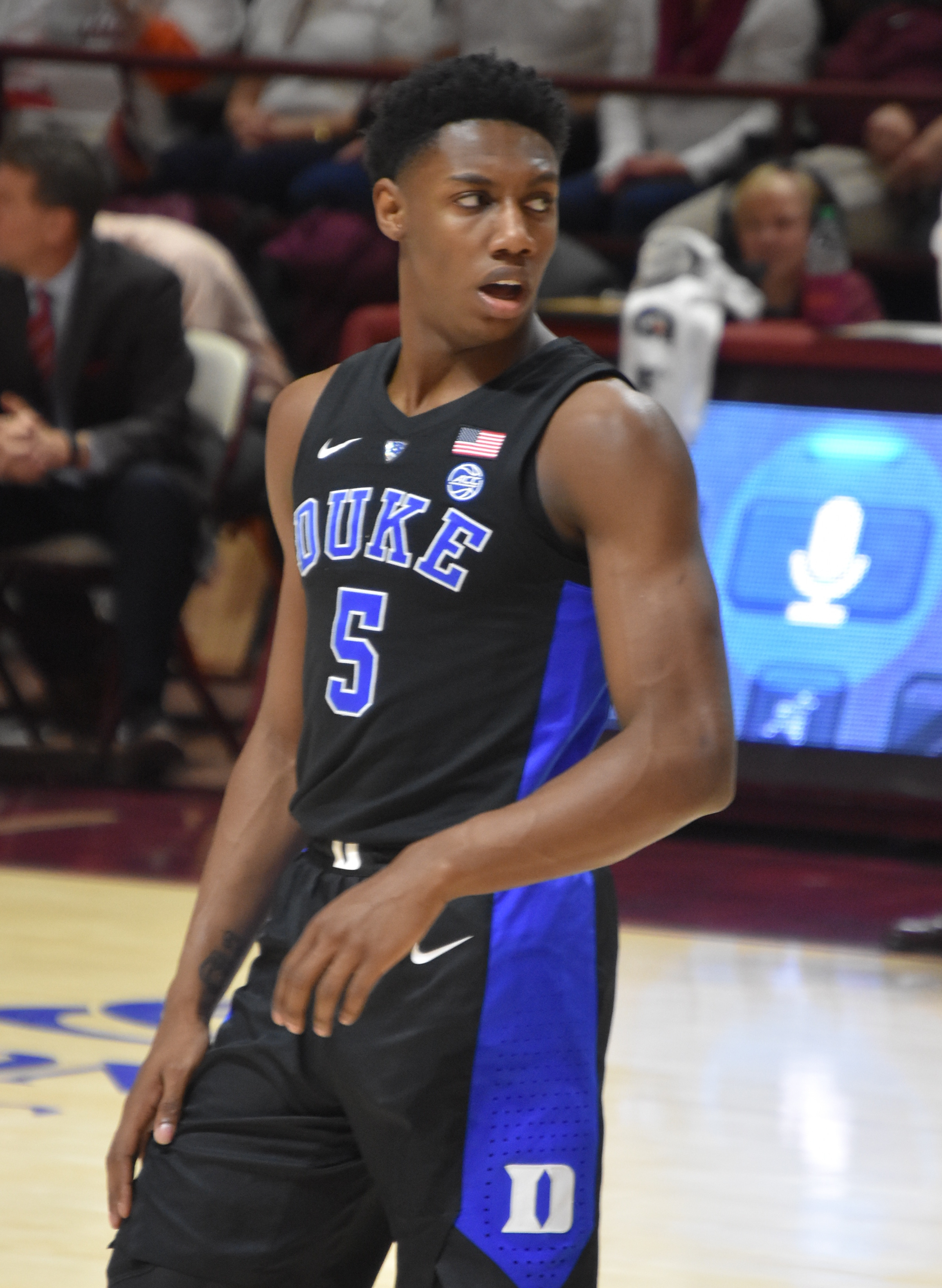
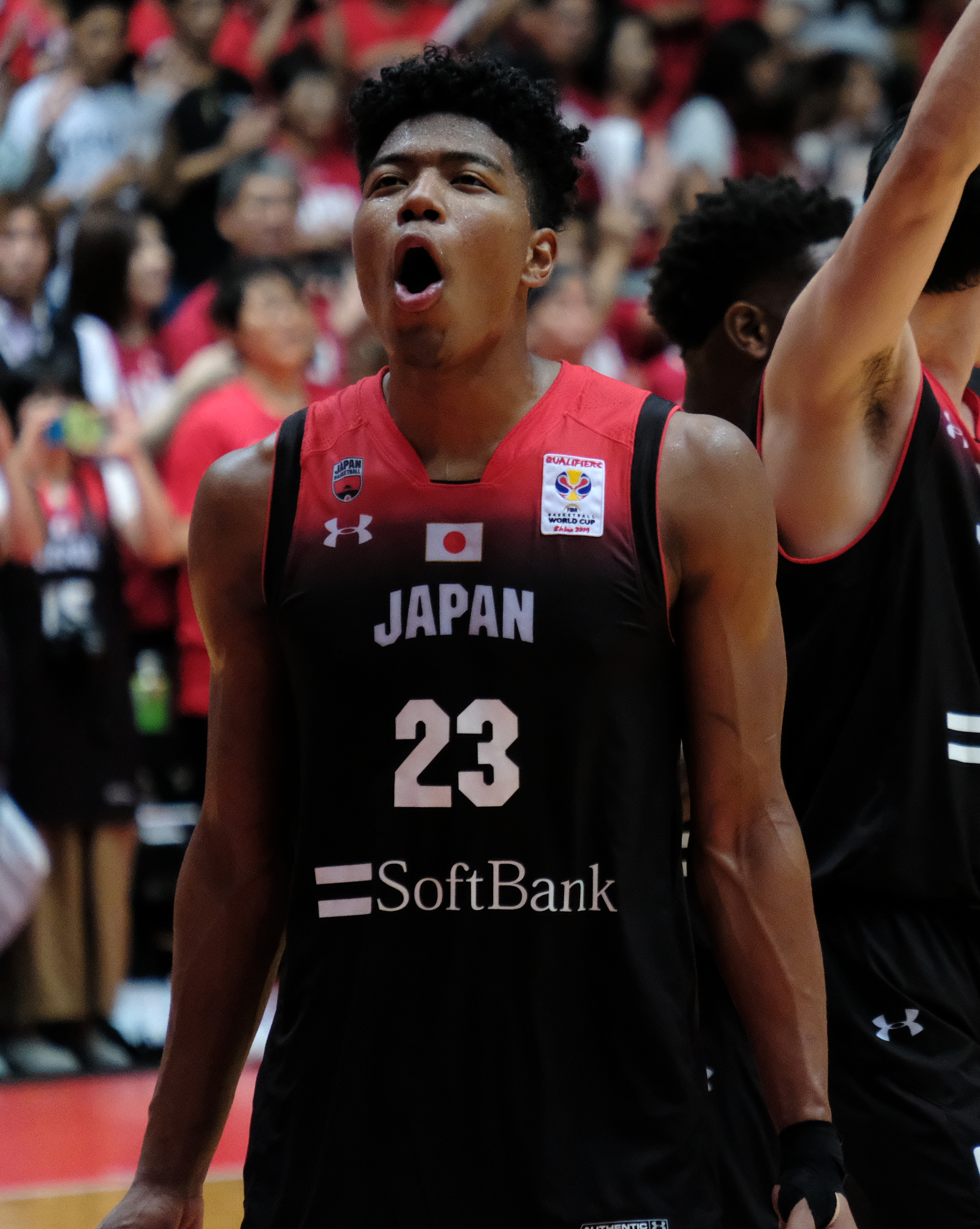
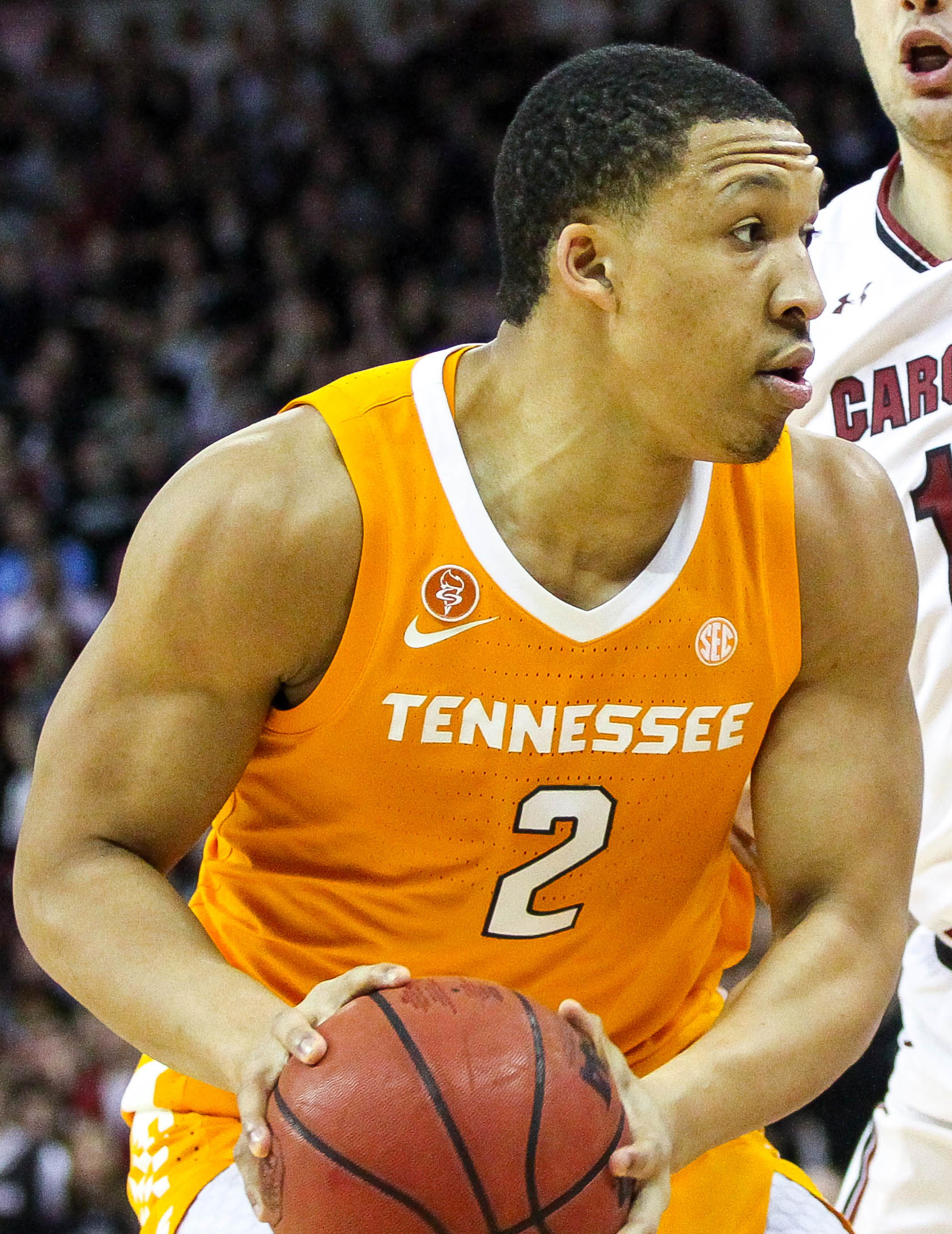
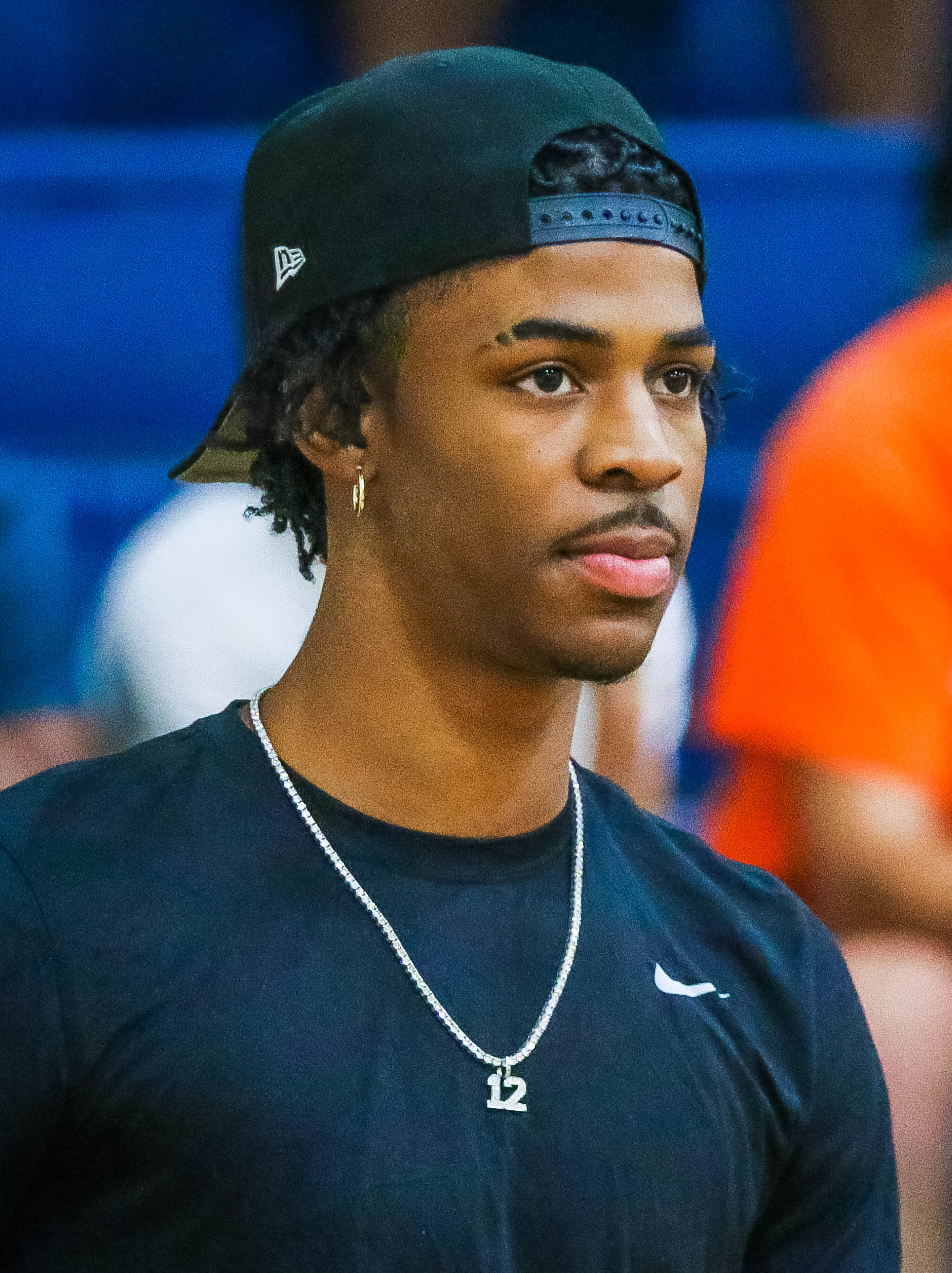
- The 2019 consensus first team. Clockwise from top left: Williamson, Barrett, Morant, Williams, Hachimura.
- Awarded for: 2018–19 NCAA Division I men's basketball season

An All-American team is an honorary sports team composed of the best amateur players of a specific season for each team position—who in turn are given the honorific "All-America" and typically referred to as "All-American athletes", or simply "All-Americans". Although the honorees generally do not compete together as a unit, the term is used in U.S. team sports to refer to players who are selected by members of the national media. Walter Camp selected the first All-America team in the early days of American football in 1889. The 2019 NCAA Men's Basketball All-Americans are honorary lists that will include All-American selections from the Associated Press (AP), the United States Basketball Writers Association (USBWA), the Sporting News (TSN), and the National Association of Basketball Coaches (NABC) for the 2018–19 NCAA Division I men's basketball season. All selectors choose three teams, while AP also lists honorable mention selections.

The Consensus 2019 College Basketball All-American team was determined by aggregating the results of the four major All-American teams as determined by the National Collegiate Athletic Association (NCAA). Since United Press International was replaced by TSN in 1997, the four major selectors have been the aforementioned ones. AP has been a selector since 1948, NABC since 1957 and USBWA since 1960. To earn "consensus" status, a player must win honors based on a point system computed from the four different all-America teams. The point system consists of three points for first team, two points for second team and one point for third team. No honorable mention or fourth team or lower are used in the computation. The top five totals plus ties are first team and the next five plus ties are second team.

Although the aforementioned lists are used to determine consensus honors, there are numerous other All-American lists. The ten finalists for the John Wooden Award are described as Wooden All-Americans. The ten finalists for the Senior CLASS Award are described as Senior All-Americans. Other All-American lists include those determined by USA Today, Fox Sports, Yahoo! Sports and many others. The scholar-athletes selected by College Sports Information Directors of America (CoSIDA) are termed Academic All-Americans.

== 2019 Consensus All-America team ==
PG – Point guard
SG – Shooting guard
PF – Power forward
SF – Small forward
C – Center

Consensus First Team
Player	Position	Class	Team
RJ Barrett	SG	Freshman	Duke
Rui Hachimura	SF/PF	Junior	Gonzaga
Ja Morant	PG	Sophomore	Murray State
Grant Williams	PF	Junior	Tennessee
Zion Williamson	SF/PF	Freshman	Duke

Consensus Second Team
Player	Position	Class	Team
Jarrett Culver	SG	Sophomore	Texas Tech
Carsen Edwards	PG/SG	Junior	Purdue
Ethan Happ	PF	Senior	Wisconsin
Markus Howard	PG	Junior	Marquette
Cassius Winston	PG	Junior	Michigan State

== Individual All-America teams ==
=== By player ===
Player	School	AP	USBWA	NABC	SN	CP	Notes
RJ Barrett	Duke	1	1	1	1	12	
Grant Williams	Tennessee	1	1	1	1	12	
Zion Williamson	Duke	1	1	1	1	12	Wooden Award, Naismith Award, Oscar Robertson Trophy, AP Player of the Year, NABC Player of the Year, Sporting News Player of the Year, USBWA National Freshman of the Year
Rui Hachimura	Gonzaga	2	1	1	1	11	
Ja Morant	Murray State	1	1	1	2	11	Lute Olson Award, Bob Cousy Award
Cassius Winston	Michigan State	1	2	2	1	10	
Ethan Happ	Wisconsin	2	2	2	2	8	Pete Newell Big Man Award
Markus Howard	Marquette	2	2	2	2	8	
Jarrett Culver	Texas Tech	2	2	3	2	7	
Carsen Edwards	Purdue	2	2	2	3	7	
De'Andre Hunter	Virginia	3	3	2	3	5	NABC Defensive Player of the Year
Dedric Lawson	Kansas	3	3	3	2	5	
P. J. Washington	Kentucky	3	3	3	3	4	
Kyle Guy	Virginia	3		3	3	3	
Brandon Clarke	Gonzaga	3			3	2	
Mike Daum	South Dakota State		3	3		2	
Chris Clemons	Campbell		3			1	

=== By team ===
All-America Team
All-America Team	First team		Second team		Third team	
All-America Team	Player	School	Player	School	Player	School
Associated Press	RJ Barrett	Duke	Jarrett Culver	Texas Tech	Brandon Clarke	Gonzaga
Associated Press	Ja Morant	Murray State	Carsen Edwards	Purdue	Kyle Guy	Virginia
Associated Press	Grant Williams	Tennessee	Rui Hachimura	Gonzaga	De'Andre Hunter	Virginia
Associated Press	Zion Williamson	Duke	Ethan Happ	Wisconsin	Dedric Lawson	Kansas
Associated Press	Cassius Winston	Michigan State	Markus Howard	Marquette	P. J. Washington	Kentucky
USBWA	RJ Barrett	Duke	Jarrett Culver	Texas Tech	Chris Clemons	Campbell
USBWA	Rui Hachimura	Gonzaga	Carsen Edwards	Purdue	Mike Daum	South Dakota State
USBWA	Ja Morant	Murray State	Ethan Happ	Wisconsin	De'Andre Hunter	Virginia
USBWA	Grant Williams	Tennessee	Markus Howard	Marquette	Dedric Lawson	Kansas
USBWA	Zion Williamson	Duke	Cassius Winston	Michigan State	P. J. Washington	Kentucky
NABC	RJ Barrett	Duke	Carsen Edwards	Purdue	Jarrett Culver	Texas Tech
NABC	Rui Hachimura	Gonzaga	Ethan Happ	Wisconsin	Mike Daum	South Dakota St.
NABC	Ja Morant	Murray State	Markus Howard	Marquette	Kyle Guy	Virginia
NABC	Grant Williams	Tennessee	De'Andre Hunter	Virginia	Dedric Lawson	Kansas
NABC	Zion Williamson	Duke	Cassius Winston	Michigan State	P. J. Washington	Kentucky
Sporting News
Sporting News	RJ Barrett	Duke	Jarrett Culver	Texas Tech	Brandon Clarke	Gonzaga
Sporting News	Rui Hachimura	Gonzaga	Ethan Happ	Wisconsin	Carsen Edwards	Purdue
Sporting News	Grant Williams	Tennessee	Markus Howard	Marquette	Kyle Guy	Virginia
Sporting News	Zion Williamson	Duke	Dedric Lawson	Kansas	De'Andre Hunter	Virginia
Sporting News	Cassius Winston	Michigan State	Ja Morant	Murray State	P. J. Washington	Kentucky

AP Honorable Mention:

- Keith Braxton, Saint Francis (PA)
- Ignas Brazdeikis, Michigan
- Tookie Brown, Georgia Southern
- Chris Clemons, Campbell
- R. J. Cole, Howard
- Jeremy Combs, Texas Southern
- Jarron Cumberland, Cincinnati
- Mike Daum, South Dakota State
- Jordan Davis, Northern Colorado
- Cameron Delaney, Sam Houston State
- Lamine Diane, Cal State Northridge
- Daniel Gafford, Arkansas
- Rapolas Ivanauskas, Colgate
- Ty Jerome, Virginia
- Cameron Johnson, North Carolina
- Jón Axel Guðmundsson, Davidson
- Anthony Lamb, Vermont
- Fletcher Magee, Wofford
- Caleb Martin, Nevada
- C. J. Massinburg, Buffalo
- Garrison Mathews, Lipscomb
- Luke Maye, North Carolina
- Drew McDonald, Northern Kentucky
- Sam Merrill, Utah State
- Jaylen Nowell, Washington
- Miye Oni, Yale
- Shamorie Ponds, St. John's
- Myles Powell, Seton Hall
- Admiral Schofield, Tennessee
- Marial Shayok, Iowa State
- B. J. Stith, Old Dominion
- Matisse Thybulle, Washington
- Jake Toolson, Utah Valley
- Marques Townes, Loyola (IL)
- Tremont Waters, LSU
- Coby White, North Carolina
- Justin Wright-Foreman, Hofstra
- Cameron Young, Quinnipiac

== Academic All-Americans ==
On March 11, 2019, the College Sports Information Directors of America (CoSIDA) announced the 2019 Academic All-America team, with Joe Sherburne headlining the NCAA Division I team as the men's college basketball Academic All-American of the Year. The following is the 2018–19 Academic All-America Division I Men's Basketball Team as selected by CoSIDA:

First Team
Player	School	Class	GPA and major
Joe Sherburne (Note: First-team selection in 2017–18.)	UMBC	GS	4.00/4.00, Financial Economics (UG) / Data Science (G)
Marcus Bartley (Note: Third-team selection in 2017–18.)	Southern Illinois	GS	4.00/4.00, Sport Administration (UG) / MBA (G)
Seth Dugan	Western Michigan	Sr.	3.97, Finance
Skylar Mays (Note: Second-team selection in 2017–18.)	LSU	Jr.	4.01, Kinesiology (Pre-Med)
Tyler Seibring (Note: First-team selection in 2017–18 and third-team selection in 2016–17.)	Elon	Sr.	3.95, English / Economics

Second Team
Player	School	Class	GPA and major
James Foye	Dartmouth	Jr.	3.96, Economics
Zachary Hunsaker	Brown	Jr.	4.00, Economics / Portuguese
Michael Jacobson	Iowa State	Sr.	3.80, Finance
Luke Maye	North Carolina	Sr.	3.47, Business Administration
Dylan Windler	Belmont	Sr.	3.74, Accounting

Third Team
Player	School	Class	GPA and major
Amidou Bamba	Coastal Carolina	Jr.	3.97, Finance
Sam Bittner	Fresno State	Sr.	3.90, Business Administration–Entrepreneurship
Clayton Custer	Loyola–Chicago	GS	3.52/3.75, Finance (UG) / MBA (G)
Brooks DeBisschop	Northern Arizona	Jr.	3.96, Finance
Matt Pile	Omaha	So.	3.90, Medicinal Chemistry

== Senior All-Americans ==
The ten finalists for the Senior CLASS Award, called Senior All-Americans, were announced on February 8, 2019. The first and second teams, as well as the award winner, were announced during the lead-in to the Final Four. The overall award winner is indicated in bold type.

=== First team ===
Player	Position	School
**Luke Maye**	Forward	North Carolina
Clayton Custer	Guard	Loyola–Chicago
Mike Daum	Forward	South Dakota State
Ethan Happ	Forward	Wisconsin
Reid Travis	Forward	Kentucky

=== Second team ===
Player	Position	School
Jon Elmore	Guard	Marshall
Drew McDonald	Forward	Northern Kentucky
Josh Perkins	Guard	Gonzaga
Dylan Windler	Guard/Forward	Belmont
Justin Wright-Foreman	Guard	Hofstra
