= Markus Howard =

American basketball player (born 1999)

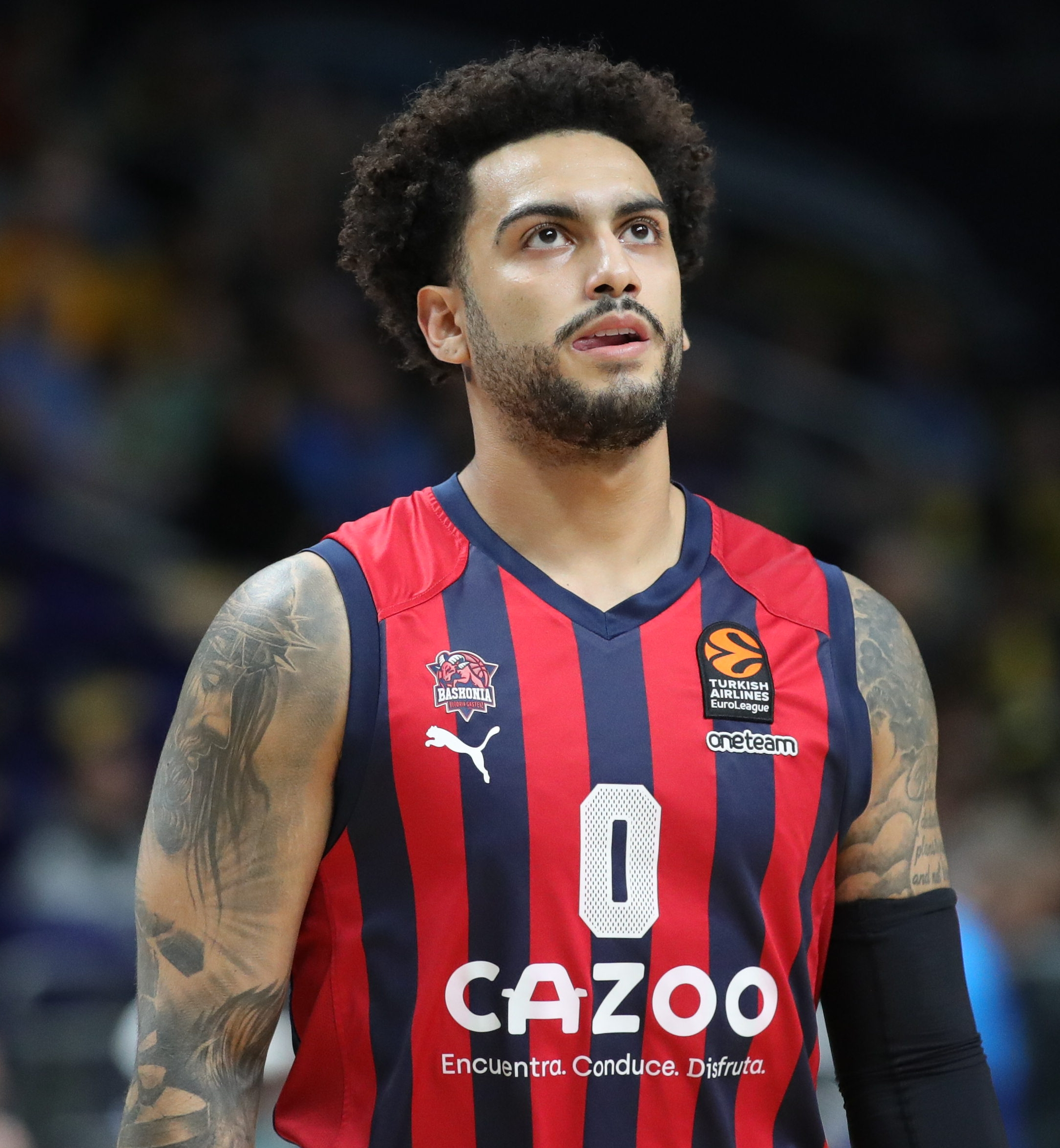
- Howard with Baskonia in 2023

No. 0 – Zenit Saint Petersburg
- Position: Shooting guard
- League: VTB United League

Personal information
- Born: March 3, 1999 (age 27) Morristown, New Jersey, U.S.
- Listed height: 1.80 m (5 ft 11 in)
- Listed weight: 79 kg (174 lb)

Career information
- High school: Perry (Gilbert, Arizona); Findlay Prep (Henderson, Nevada)
- College: Marquette (2016–2020)
- NBA draft: 2020: undrafted
- Playing career: 2020–present

Career history
- 2020–2022: Denver Nuggets
- 2021–2022: →Grand Rapids Gold
- 2022–2026: Baskonia
- 2026–present: Zenit Saint Petersburg

Career highlights
- Alphonso Ford EuroLeague Top Scorer Trophy (2024); Spanish Cup winner (2026); 2× All-Liga ACB First Team (2023, 2024); Liga ACB Top Scorer (2024); Consensus first-team All-American (2020); Consensus second-team All-American (2019); NCAA scoring champion (2020); Big East Player of the Year (2019); Senior CLASS Award (2020); 2× First-team All-Big East (2019, 2020); Second-team All-Big East (2018); Big East All-Freshman Team (2017)
- Stats at NBA.com
- Stats at Basketball Reference
Medals
Men's basketball
Representing the United States
FIBA U17 World Cup
Gold medal – first place	2016 Spain	National team

Markus Anthony Howard (born March 3, 1999) is a Puerto Rican professional basketball player for Zenit Saint Petersburg of the VTB United League. He played college basketball for the Marquette Golden Eagles, where he was a two-time All-American and led the nation in scoring in the 2019–20 season.

== High school career ==
Howard began his high school career at Perry High School in Gilbert, Arizona. As a freshman, he started in the backcourt with his brother and averaged 23 points per game, leading his team to the state semifinals. He committed to Arizona State following his freshman season. After a sophomore season where he averaged 32.4 points per game, Howard decommitted from Arizona State and reopened up his recruitment.

For his junior season, Howard transferred to national basketball power Findlay Prep in Henderson, Nevada. During his junior season at Findlay Prep, where he led the team in scoring, Howard announced that he would reclassify to the class of 2016 and signed with Marquette.

== College career ==
As a freshman at Marquette University, Howard entered the starting lineup and averaged 13.2 points per game and led the country in three-point shooting at 54.7%. He was named to the 2017 Big East Conference All-Freshman team. As a sophomore, Howard became one of college basketball's top scorers. On the season, Howard averaged 20.4 points per game and was named second-team All-Big East. He also finished the season with the NCAA's second-best free throw percentage (93.8%).

Going into his junior season of 2018–19, Howard earned national preseason recognition, appearing on the watch lists for the Wooden Award, the Naismith Award and the Bob Cousy Award for top point guard. Howard was also selected preseason first-team All-Big East. In Marquette's non-conference schedule, Howard recorded two 45-point games, against ranked teams Kansas State and Buffalo. In the Buffalo win, Howard scored 40 of his total in the second half. He scored a career-high 53 points in an overtime win over Creighton on January 9, 2019, breaking a Big East single-game record.

Howard became Marquette's all-time leading scorer when he contributed 38 points in an 88–53 victory against Loyola (Md.) in the team's season opener of his senior year. He was named Big East player of the week on November 11, 2019. On November 29, Howard scored 51 points in a 101–79 win over USC. He became the third player to score 50 points in a game in three straight seasons, joining Wayman Tisdale and Pete Maravich. In addition, since he scored 40 points in the previous match, he joined Maravich, Johnny Neumann, and Bob Pettit as the only players in major conferences to score 40 points on back-to-back days. Howard sat out a game against Jacksonville on December 4 with a concussion. On February 12, 2020, Howard scored 24 points and had five rebounds and two assists in a 72–71 loss to Villanova. He became the Big East's all-time leading scorer in league games, surpassing Lawrence Moten's 1,405 points. At the conclusion of the regular season, Howard was unanimously selected to the First Team All-Big East. Howard averaged 27.8 points and 3.3 assists per game as a senior. During his time at Marquette University, Howard accumulated 2761 points.

== Professional career ==
=== Denver Nuggets (2020–2022) ===
After going undrafted in the 2020 NBA draft, Howard signed a two-way deal with the Denver Nuggets whose official announcement was released on November 30, 2020. On May 13, 2021, Howard scored a career-high 15 points in a 114–103 win over the Minnesota Timberwolves. He re-signed with the Nuggets on a new two-way contract on August 15, 2021. Howard appeared in 31 games and had two 20-point performances during the 2021–22 season.

=== Baskonia (2022–2026) ===
On July 17, 2022, the Spanish club Baskonia announced the signing of Howard into a two-year deal. In October 2022, Howard became the eighth player ever to score 30 points or more in back-to-back games in the EuroLeague. He scored 33 points against Partizan on October 14, 2022, and 30 points against Crvena zvezda on October 19, 2022.

On October 4, 2023, Howard signed a new contract with Baskonia through 2026, and on May 14, 2024, he agreed upon a further extension through 2028. On October 14, 2026, he parted ways with Baskonia as the club's second all-time leading scorer.

=== Zenit Saint Petersburg (2026–present) ===
On the same day, Howard signed a two-year contract with Zenit Saint Petersburg of the VTB United League through the end of the 2027–28 season.

== National team career ==
Howard has represented the United States in FIBA play on two occasions. In 2015, he was a member of the gold medal-winning US team in the 2015 FIBA Americas Under-16 Championship. Howard then won a gold medal at the 2016 FIBA Under-17 World Championship in Zaragoza, Spain. In the U17 tournament, Howard averaged 11.9 points and 2.6 assists per game.

== Career statistics ==
Legend
GP	Games played	GS	Games started	MPG	Minutes per game
FG%	Field-goal percentage	3P%	3-point field-goal percentage	FT%	Free-throw percentage
RPG	Rebounds per game	APG	Assists per game	SPG	Steals per game
BPG	Blocks per game	PPG	Points per game	PIR	Performance index rating
**Bold**	Career high

=== NBA ===
==== Regular season ====
Year	Team	GP	GS	MPG	FG%	3P%	FT%	RPG	APG	SPG	BPG	PPG
2020–21	Denver	**37**	**1**	5.5	.377	.277	.778	**.6**	**.5**	.1	.0	2.8
2021–22	Denver	31	0	**5.7**	**.386**	**.400**	**.870**	.4	.2	**.3**	.0	**4.1**
Career		68	1	5.6	.382	.341	.844	.5	.4	.2	.0	3.4

==== Playoffs ====
Year	Team	GP	GS	MPG	FG%	3P%	FT%	RPG	APG	SPG	BPG	PPG
2021	Denver	9	0	12.4	.405	.423	.500	.8	.4	—	.1	4.7
Career		9	0	12.4	.405	.423	.500	.8	.4	—	.1	4.7

=== EuroLeague ===
*	Led the league

Year	Team	GP	GS	MPG	FG%	3P%	FT%	RPG	APG	SPG	BPG	PPG	PIR
2022–23	Baskonia	33	16	20.5	.400	.365	**.886**	1.4	1.2	**.6**	—	14.2	8.4
2023–24	Baskonia	**39**	**18**	**23.0**	**.431**	**.400**	.837	1.2	1.6	.5	.0	**19.5***	**11.0**
2024–25	Baskonia	32	**18**	22.4	.372	.339	.850	1.3	1.5	.3	—	12.1	6.8
2025–26	Baskonia	23	15	20.6	.401	.349	.808	**1.6**	**2.1**	.4	—	10.4	6.9
Career		127	67	21.4	.40.6	.369	.852	1.3	1.6	.5	.0	14.6	8.4

=== Domestic leagues ===
*	Led the League

Year	Team	League	GP	MPG	FG%	3P%	FT%	RPG	APG	SPG	BPG	PPG
2021–22	(United States) Grand Rapids Gold	G League	2	25.4	.367	.368	1.000	4.5	3.5	—	—	16.5
2022–23	(Spain) Baskonia	ACB	32	19.1	.463	.424	.777	1.1	1.3	.6	—	16.5
2023–24	(Spain) Baskonia	ACB	30	22.3	.439	.410	.893	1.3	1.3	.6	—	19.4*
2024–25	(Spain) Baskonia	ACB	34	23.5	.391	.383	.822	1.7	1.2	.9	—	15.0
2025–26	(Spain) Baskonia	ACB	12	23.1	.449	.371	.913	.8	1.4	.8	—	15.8

=== College ===
*	Led NCAA Division I

Year	Team	GP	GS	MPG	FG%	3P%	FT%	RPG	APG	SPG	BPG	PPG
2016–17	Marquette	31	27	22.0	**.506**	**.547**	.889	2.2	2.3	.8	**.1**	13.2
2017–18	Marquette	**34**	31	31.5	.464	.404	**.938**	3.2	2.8	1.0	**.1**	20.4
2018–19	Marquette	**34**	**34**	**33.5**	.420	.403	.890	**4.0**	**3.9**	**1.1**	.0	25.0
2019–20	Marquette	29	29	33.2	.422	.412	.847	3.5	3.3	.9	.0	**27.8***
Career		128	121	30.1	.444	.427	.882	3.2	3.1	1.0	.0	21.6

== Personal life ==
Howard's older brother Jordan Howard played college basketball for Central Arkansas and was the 2018 Southland Conference Player of the Year. The brothers were teammates for one season at Perry High. He is of Puerto Rican descent.

Howard is very public about his Christian faith. Howard explained the reason why he wears number 0 by saying, "First and foremost, I'm a Christian before anything else. I'm a son [of God], so I want to be sure that my number meant something and it represented something. It truly represents that without my relationship with Christ, I feel like I am not the person that I'm meant to be." In 2018, Howard started a Fellowship of Christian Athletes club at Marquette. Mother is Noemi Santana Howard Father is Clarence "Chuck" Howard

== See also ==
- List of NCAA Division I men's basketball season scoring leaders
- List of NCAA Division I men's basketball season 3-point field goal leaders
- List of NCAA Division I men's basketball career 3-point scoring leaders
