= Skylar Mays =

American basketball player (born 1997)

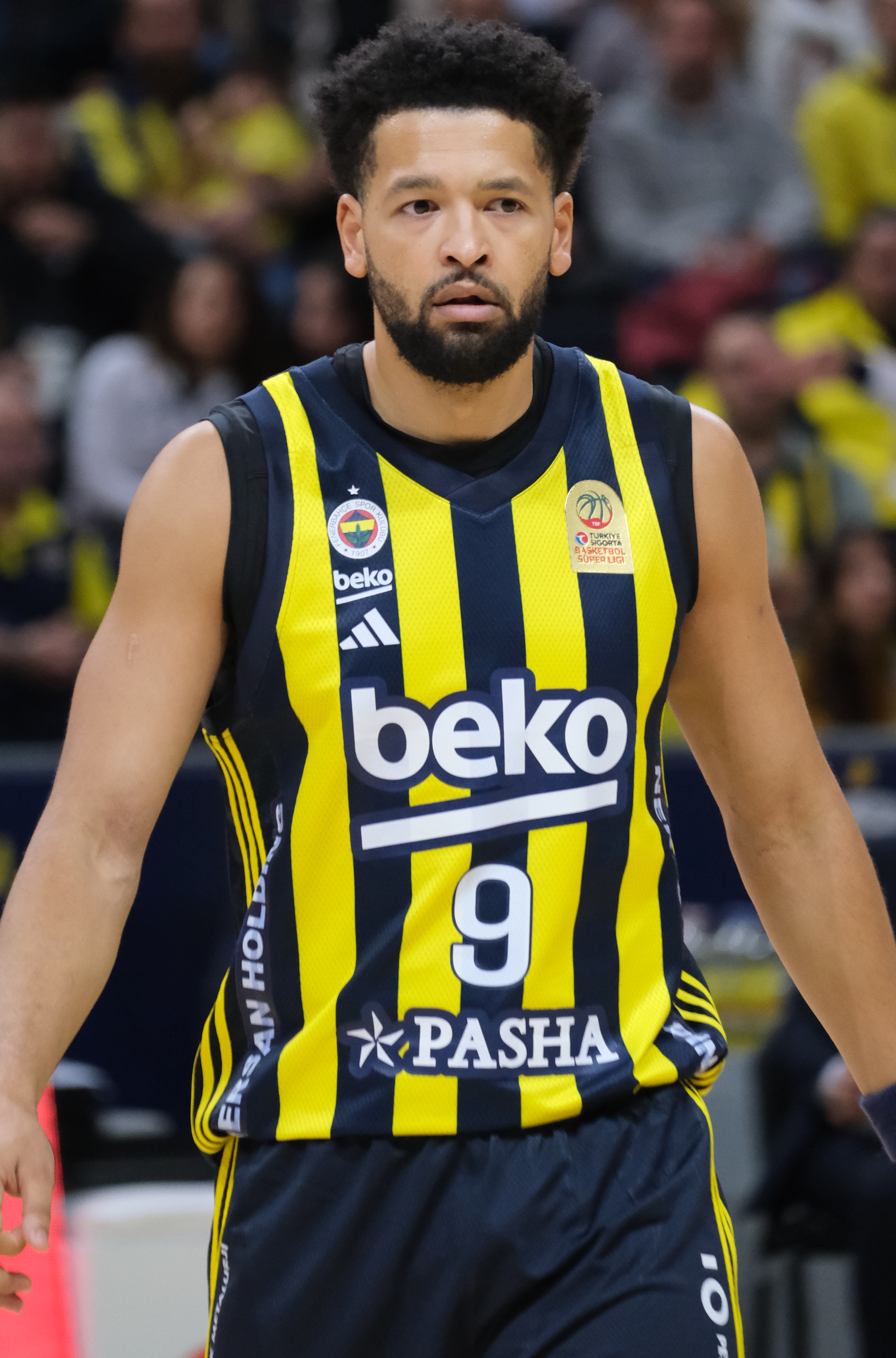
- Mays with Fenerbahçe in 2024

No. 17 – New Zealand Breakers
- Position: Point guard
- League: NBL

Personal information
- Born: September 5, 1997 (age 29) Baton Rouge, Louisiana, U.S.
- Listed height: 6 ft 3 in (1.91 m)
- Listed weight: 205 lb (93 kg)

Career information
- High school: University (Baton Rouge, Louisiana); Findlay Prep (Henderson, Nevada)
- College: LSU (2016–2020)
- NBA draft: 2020: 2nd round, 50th overall pick
- Drafted by: Atlanta Hawks
- Playing career: 2020–present

Career history
- 2020–2022: Atlanta Hawks
- 2021–2022: →College Park Skyhawks
- 2022–2023: Delaware Blue Coats
- 2023: Mexico City Capitanes
- 2023–2024: Portland Trail Blazers
- 2024: Los Angeles Lakers
- 2024: →South Bay Lakers
- 2024–2025: Fenerbahçe
- 2025: Iowa Wolves
- 2025–2026: Budućnost
- 2026: South East Melbourne Phoenix
- 2026–present: New Zealand Breakers

Career highlights
- First-team All-SEC (2020); Second-team All-SEC (2019); Academic All-American of the Year (2020); 2× First-team Academic All-American (2019, 2020); Second-team Academic All-American (2018)
- Stats at NBA.com
- Stats at Basketball Reference

Skylar Justin Mays (born September 5, 1997) is an American professional basketball player for the New Zealand Breakers of the Australian National Basketball League (NBL). He played college basketball for the LSU Tigers.

== Early life ==
Mays grew up in Baton Rouge, Louisiana and attended the Louisiana State University Laboratory School (U-High), where he began playing on the varsity basketball team in eighth grade. He dunked for the first time as a freshman. He was named first-team All-State in his sophomore and junior seasons as he helped lead the Cubs to back to back state championships. As a junior, he averaged 9.1 points, 8.1 assists and 3.2 rebounds. Mays transferred to Findlay Prep in Henderson, Nevada before his senior year and averaged 10.9 points, 5.3 assists, 3.0 rebounds and 2.7 steals in his only season with the Pilots. Rated a three-star recruit, Mays initially committed to play college basketball at Louisiana State during his sophomore year before re-opening his recruitment to other schools shortly before he transferred to Findlay. Mays eventually re-committed to LSU after considering offers from Baylor, UNLV, Oklahoma State, Memphis, California and Stanford.

== College career ==
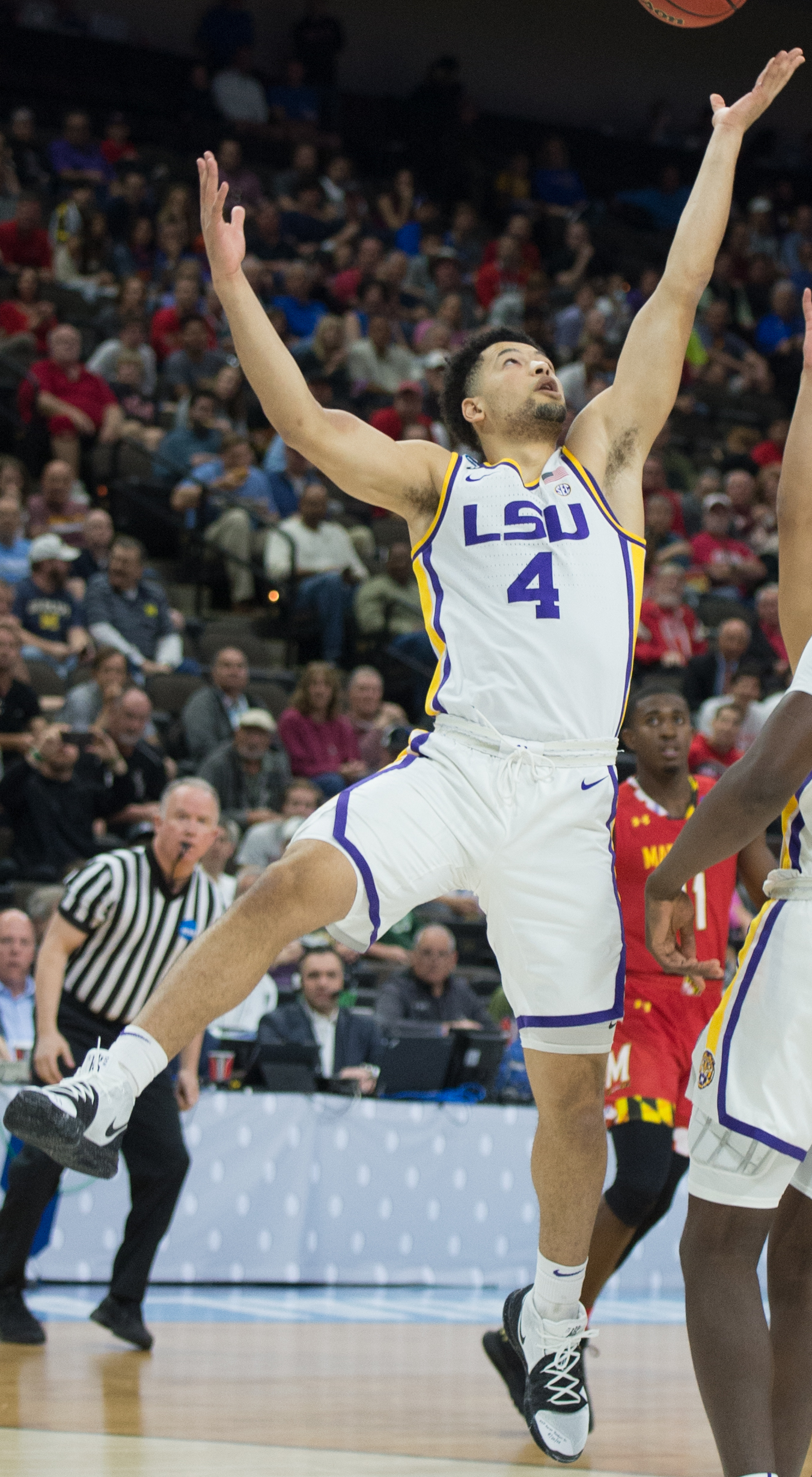
Mays with LSU in 2019

Mays became the Tigers' starting point guard during his freshman year, averaging 8.3 points, 2.2 rebounds, 3.6 assists and 1.3 steals over 31 games (25 starts). As a sophomore, Mays averaged 11.3 points, 4.0 rebounds and 3.0 assists as well as 1.6 steals per game. He averaged 13.4 points, 3.3 rebounds 2.1 assists and 1.9 steals per game as a junior and was named second team All-Southeastern Conference (SEC) and the conference's scholar-athlete of the year. Mays scored his 1,000th career point on February 26, 2019, against Texas A&M. After the season, Mays declared for the 2019 NBA draft but ultimately opted to return to LSU.

Mays was named preseason first team All-SEC and to the watchlists for the Jerry West and the Naismith Player of the Year awards. He was also named the 45th-best collegiate basketball player going into the 2019–20 season by CBS Sports. Mays scored a career-high 30 points on November 22, 2019, in an 80–78 loss to Utah State. Mays tied his career high with 30 points along with eight assists and seven rebounds on February 8, 2020, in a 91–90 overtime loss to Auburn. At the end of the regular season he was again named a first team Academic All-American and was selected as the Academic All-American of the Year as well as First Team All-SEC and was named the scholar-athlete of the year for a second straight season. Mays averaged 16.7 points and 5.0 rebounds per game.

== Professional career ==
=== Atlanta Hawks (2020–2022) ===
On November 18, 2020, Mays was selected with the 50th pick in the 2020 NBA draft by the Atlanta Hawks. Mays signed a two-way contract with the team on November 24, 2020, meaning he would split time between the Hawks and their NBA G League affiliate, the College Park Skyhawks. On February 13, Mays scored a career-high 20 points against the San Antonio Spurs, cutting a 45-point deficit to just 11 in the second half.

Mays played for the Hawks in the 2021 NBA summer league, scoring 13 points in 30 minutes on 4-of-11 shooting at his debut in an 85–83 loss against the Boston Celtics. On August 26, 2021, Mays signed a second two-way contract with the Hawks. On April 7, 2022, the Hawks converted his previously signed two-way contract into a standard NBA contract.

=== Delaware Blue Coats (2022–2023) ===
On November 4, 2022, Mays was named to the opening night roster for the Delaware Blue Coats.

=== Mexico City Capitanes (2023) ===
On February 4, 2023, Mays was traded along with Justin Robinson and Raphiael Putney to the Mexico City Capitanes in exchange for Jahlil Okafor, Shabazz Napier, Bruno Caboclo, and Matt Mooney.

=== Portland Trail Blazers (2023–2024) ===
On March 30, 2023, Mays signed a 10-day contract with the Portland Trail Blazers and on October 1, he signed a two-way contract with them. After a strong showing in an overtime loss to the Sacramento Kings on November 9 in which Mays scored 18 points and had 11 assists in 37 minutes off the bench he started 5 games for the injury depleted Trail Blazers in which he averaged 12 points and 8.2 assists per game. On November 12, he signed a standard contract with Portland. On January 6, 2024, he was waived by Portland.

=== Los Angeles / South Bay Lakers (2024) ===
On January 8, 2024, Mays signed a two-way contract with the Los Angeles Lakers.

On September 25, 2024, Mays signed with the Minnesota Timberwolves, but was waived on October 15.

=== Fenerbahçe Beko (2024–2025) ===
On October 18, 2024, Mays signed with Fenerbahçe Beko until the end of the season. On January 31, 2025, Mays was released by the Turkish powerhouse.

=== Iowa Wolves (2025) ===
On February 5, 2025, Mays signed with Iowa Wolves of the NBA G League.

=== KK Budućnost (2025–2026) ===
On July 31, 2025, Mays signed with KK Budućnost of the Montenegrin Prva A Liga.

=== South East Melbourne Phoenix (2026) ===
On July 28, 2026, Mays signed with the South East Melbourne Phoenix of the Australian National Basketball League (NBL) for the 2026–27 season. He parted ways with the Phoenix on November 12 after averaging 11.7 points and four assists in 11 games.

=== New Zealand Breakers (2026–present) ===
On November 14, 2026, Mays signed with the New Zealand Breakers for the rest of the 2026–27 NBL season as an injury replacement for Parker Jackson-Cartwright.

== Career statistics ==
Legend
GP	Games played	GS	Games started	MPG	Minutes per game
FG%	Field goal percentage	3P%	3-point field goal percentage	FT%	Free throw percentage
RPG	Rebounds per game	APG	Assists per game	SPG	Steals per game
BPG	Blocks per game	PPG	Points per game	**Bold**	Career high

=== NBA ===
==== Regular season ====
Year	Team	GP	GS	MPG	FG%	3P%	FT%	RPG	APG	SPG	BPG	PPG
2020–21	Atlanta	**33**	0	8.2	.449	.350	.880	1.1	.9	.4	.1	3.8
2021–22	Atlanta	28	5	7.9	**.500**	.320	.889	.9	.6	.3	.0	2.9
2022–23	Portland	6	**6**	**31.5**	**.500**	**.462**	**.923**	**3.2**	**8.3**	**1.0**	**.2**	**15.3**
2023–24	Portland	21	5	17.0	.384	.286	.765	1.8	3.6	.7	.1	6.3
2023–24	L.A. Lakers	17	0	4.5	.476	.400	—	.4	.6	.4	.1	1.3
Career		105	16	10.6	.445	.345	.859	1.2	1.7	.5	.1	4.3

==== Playoffs ====
Year	Team	GP	GS	MPG	FG%	3P%	FT%	RPG	APG	SPG	BPG	PPG
2021	Atlanta	**7**	0	2.4	.800	—	—	.3	.1	.3	.0	**1.1**
2022	Atlanta	2	0	**4.5**	**1.000**	—	—	**.5**	**.5**	**.5**	.0	1.0
Career		9	0	2.9	.833	—	—	.3	.2	.3	.0	1.1

=== College ===
Year	Team	GP	GS	MPG	FG%	3P%	FT%	RPG	APG	SPG	BPG	PPG
2016–17	LSU	31	25	22.9	.411	.328	.812	2.2	**3.6**	1.3	.1	8.3
2017–18	LSU	33	30	31.1	.443	.351	.837	4.0	2.9	1.6	**.2**	11.3
2018–19	LSU	**35**	**35**	33.1	.421	.313	**.860**	3.3	2.1	**1.9**	**.2**	13.4
2019–20	LSU	31	31	**34.4**	**.491**	**.394**	.854	**5.0**	3.2	1.8	**.2**	**16.7**
Career		130	121	30.5	.445	.345	.845	3.6	2.9	1.6	.2	12.4

== Personal life ==
Mays' best friend and LSU teammate, Wayde Sims, was killed by a gunshot wound to the head and neck on September 28, 2018. Mays served as the pallbearer at the funeral. He gave an 11-minute speech in Sims's honor at an on-campus vigil outside the Pete Maravich Assembly Center in front of a crowd of hundreds. Mays wore customized Nike basketball shoes by artist Michael Anderson during the 2019 SEC Tournament in honor of Sims.
