= Findlay Prep =

High school basketball program

Findlay Prep Pilots
- Nickname: Pilots
- Sport: Basketball
- Founded: 2006
- Disbanded: 2019
- Conference: Nevada Interscholastic Activities Association (NIAA)
- Based in: Henderson, Nevada
- Colors: Red, White, Blue
- Owner: Cliff Findlay
- Head coach: Paul Washington Sr
- Affiliation: Henderson International School
- Overall record: 381–43 (.899)
- Championships: 3 (2009, 2010, 2012)
- Website: https://www.findlayprep.com/ (inactive)

Findlay Prep is a former high school basketball program located in Henderson, Nevada.

== History ==
The program was created in 2006 by local businessman Cliff Findlay, who owns several car dealerships in the Las Vegas area. Despite closing its high school in 2010 due to the local economic downturn, the Findlay Prep players took high school classes at Henderson International School.

Findlay was part of the Nevada Interscholastic Activities Association (NIAA), but they were ineligible to compete in state championships because they were allowed to recruit from outside the state. Instead, they competed for National High School Invitational (NHSI) championships, an 8 team tournament featuring the top high school teams in the country played in New York. They won a total of 3 national championships during their time, coming in 2009, 2010, and 2012, all under Mike Peck.

Through the years, Findlay produced 17 NBA players and over 70 Division I athletes. The program produced several international players as well from countries like Lithuania, Senegal, Canada, France, Georgia, and others. They had an all-time record of 381–43 (.899), with only 2 losses ever on their home court.

Paul Washington Sr. was named the program's head coach in August 2016. Due to its perceived overemphasis on basketball, critics have slammed it as a basketball factory that gives students hope of a pro career instead of education. School officials refuted these allegations arguing their students' "100% qualification rate" with the NCAA. Findlay Prep was branded as "non-scholastic" by the same organisation in 2013 and later affiliated themselves with the NIAA.

In 2019, after the completion of their season, the program unexpectedly shut down for unknown reasons.

== Notable alumni ==
- Ogo Adegboye (Class of 2007) – basketball player who played professionally in Cyprus, Greece, Italy, and England
- Curtis Dennis (Class of 2008) – former basketball player who played professionally in Lebanon
- Deividas Dulkys (Class of 2008) – NBA assistant coach and former basketball player who played professionally in Lithuania, Latvia, Poland, Turkey, and Spain
- Jorge Gutierrez (Class of 2008) – former NBA player who played professionally in Mexico
- DeAndre Liggins (Class of 2008) – former NBA player who plays professionally in Saudi Arabia
- Avery Bradley (Class of 2009) – former All Defensive Team NBA player, won the 2020 NBA Championship with the Los Angeles Lakers
- Guy Edi (Class of 2009) – basketball player who played professionally in France, Finland, Iceland, and Canada
- D. J. Richardson (Class of 2009) – professional basketball player who played college basketball for Illinois
- Victor Rudd (Class of 2009) – professional basketball player
- Cory Joseph (Class of 2010) – NBA player, won the 2014 NBA Championship with the San Antonio Spurs
- Tristan Thompson (Class of 2010) – former NBA player, won the 2016 NBA Championship with the Cleveland Cavaliers
- Amir Garrett (Class of 2011) – MLB pitcher
- Nick Johnson (Class of 2011) – basketball player in the Israeli Basketball Premier League
- Myck Kabongo (Class of 2011) – former basketball player
- Dominic Artis (Class of 2012) – basketball player for the Çağdaş Bodrumspor
- Brandon Ashley (Class of 2012) – professional basketball player
- Anthony Bennett (Class of 2012) – NBA player, #1 overall pick in the 2013 NBA draft
- Amedeo Della Valle (Class of 2012) – professional basketball player
- Landen Lucas (Class of 2012) – professional basketball player who played college basketball at Kansas
- Naz Mitrou-Long (Class of 2012 – transferred) – NBA player
- Winston Shepard (Class of 2012) – professional basketball player
- Allerik Freeman (Class of 2013) – basketball player for KK Budućnost
- Gavin Schilling (Class of 2013) – basketball player for U.S. Victoria Libertas Pallacanestro
- Nigel Williams-Goss (Class of 2013) – NBA player
- Christian Wood (Class of 2013) – NBA player
- Braian Angola (Class of 2014) – basketball player who played professionally for the NBA G League, in Belgium, Serbia, Israel, Greece, and Turkey
- Dillon Brooks (Class of 2014) – NBA All Defensive Team player
- Kelly Oubre Jr. (Class of 2014) – NBA player
- Rashad Vaughn (Class of 2014) – NBA player
- Aleksa Novaković (Class of 2015) – basketball player for BC Nizhny Novgorod
- Derryck Thornton (Class of 2015) – Professional basketball player
- Allonzo Trier (Class of 2015) – NBA player
- Markus Howard (Class of 2016) – NBA player
- Justin Jackson (Class of 2016) – basketball player who was drafted by the Denver Nuggets
- Skylar Mays (Class of 2016) – NBA player
- Oshae Brissett (Class of 2017 – transferred) – Israeli Basketball Premier League and NBA player; won the 2024 NBA championship
- P. J. Washington (Class of 2017) – NBA player
- Bol Bol (Class of 2018) – NBA player
- Kyler Edwards (Class of 2018) — basketball guard in the Israeli Basketball Premier League
- Nathan Mensah (Class of 2018) - basketball center for Maccabi Tel Aviv who played college basketball at San Diego State
- Dior Johnson (Class of 2022 – transferred) – basketball point guard for the University of Central Florida
