= Cassius Winston =

American basketball player (born 1998)

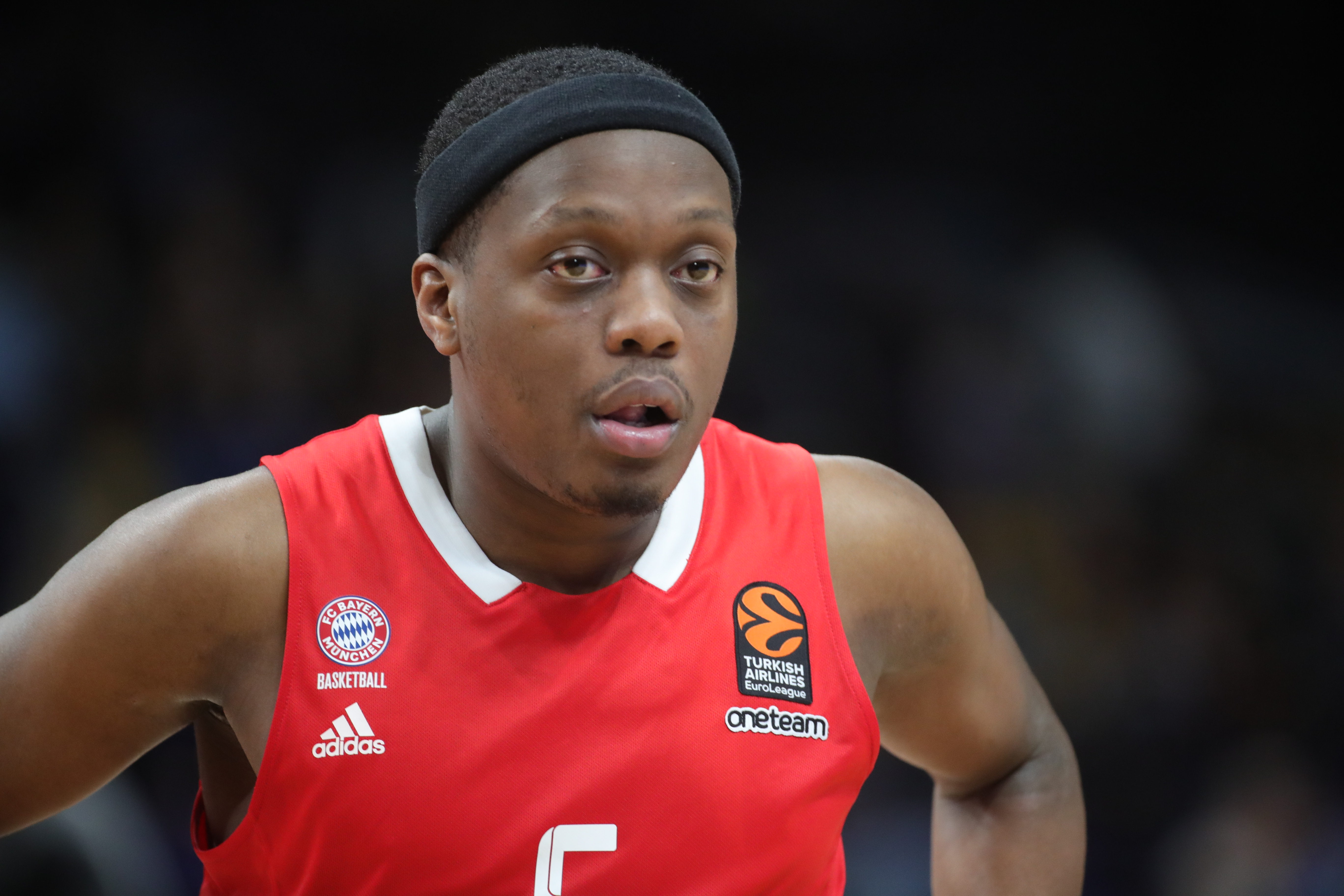
- Winston with Bayern Munich in 2022

No. 2 – Rytas Vilnius
- Position: Point guard
- League: LKL; BCL

Personal information
- Born: February 28, 1998 (age 28) Detroit, Michigan, U.S.
- Listed height: 6 ft 1 in (1.85 m)
- Listed weight: 185 lb (84 kg)

Career information
- High school: University of Detroit Jesuit (Detroit, Michigan)
- College: Michigan State (2016–2020)
- NBA draft: 2020: 2nd round, 53rd overall pick
- Drafted by: Oklahoma City Thunder
- Playing career: 2020–present

Career history
- 2020–2022: Washington Wizards
- 2021: →Erie BayHawks
- 2021–2022: →Capital City Go-Go
- 2022–2023: Bayern Munich
- 2023–2024: Tofaş
- 2024–2025: UnaHotels Reggio Emilia
- 2025–2026: Hapoel Jerusalem
- 2026–present: Rytas Vilnius

Career highlights
- German Cup winner (2023); 2× Consensus second-team All-American (2019, 2020); Big Ten Player of the Year (2019); 2× First-team All-Big Ten (2019, 2020); Third-team All-Big Ten (2018); Big Ten tournament MOP (2019); Mr. Basketball of Michigan (2016)
- Stats at NBA.com
- Stats at Basketball Reference

Cassius Xavier-Lamarr Winston (born February 28, 1998) is an American professional basketball player for Rytas Vilnius of the Lithuanian Basketball League (LKL) and the Basketball Champions League (BCL). He played college basketball for the Michigan State Spartans.

== High school career ==
Winston, a 6'1 point guard, was a star prep player at University of Detroit Jesuit High School and Academy in Detroit. As a senior in 2016, he led his team to an MHSAA Class A State Championship, and was named Mr. Basketball of Michigan. Winston was inducted into the Catholic High School League Hall of Fame in 2020.

=== Recruiting ===
College recruiting
Name	Hometown	School	Height	Weight	Commit date
Cassius Winston; PG	Detroit, MI	University of Detroit Jesuit (MI)	6 ft 1 in (1.85 m)	179 lb (81 kg)	Sep 18, 2015
Cassius Winston; PG	Recruit ratings: Rivals: 247Sports: ESPN: (89)				
Overall recruit ranking: Rivals: 29 247Sports: 31 ESPN: 31
Note: In many cases, Scout, Rivals, 247Sports, On3, and ESPN may conflict in their listings of height and weight.; In these cases, the average was taken. ESPN grades are on a 100-point scale.; Sources: "2016 Team Ranking". Rivals.

== College career ==
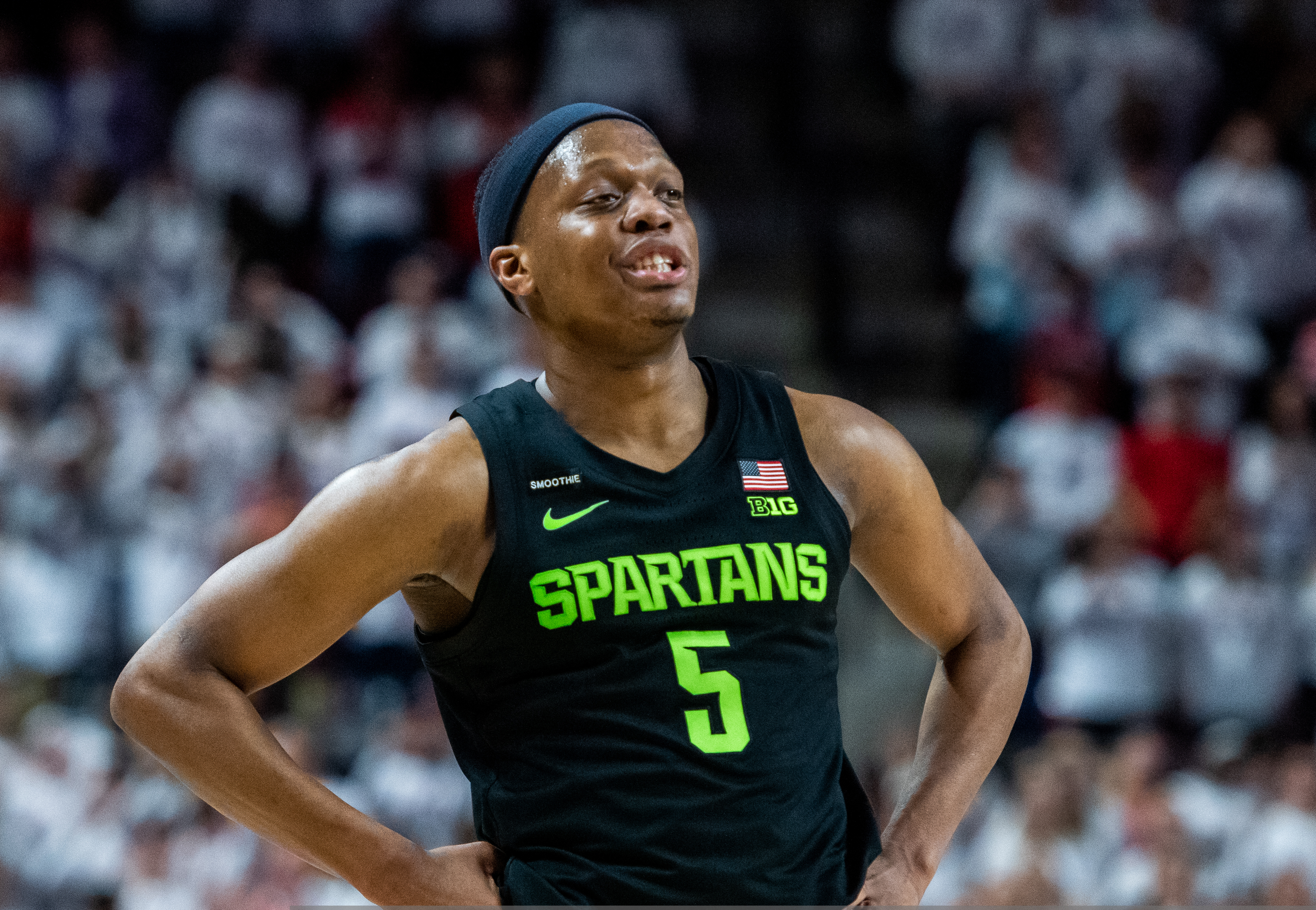
Winston in February 2020

He chose to attend college at Michigan State, and averaged 6.7 points and 5.2 assists per game in 35 games as a freshman. As a sophomore, he became a full-time starter, averaging 12.6 points and 6.9 assists per game for the Spartans, and earning third-team All-Big Ten Conference honors.

Entering into Winston's junior season, he was selected to the preseason All-Big Ten team. After a strong start to the year, he was named to the midseason watch list for the John R. Wooden Award. He would lead the Spartans to a 2019 Big Ten men's basketball tournament championship, being named Big Ten tournament Most Outstanding Player.

On March 11, 2019, Winston was named the Big Ten Player of the Year. On March 31, 2019, Winston scored 20 points along with 10 assists in a 68–67 win against Duke in the Elite Eight of the 2019 NCAA Division I men's basketball tournament.

Prior to the start of the 2019–20 season, Winston was unanimously named a preseason All-American by the Associated Press (AP), the only player so honored. On December 29, Winston missed a game against Western Michigan with a bone bruise in his knee. He scored a career-high 32 points along with nine assists in a 87–69 win over Michigan on January 5, 2020. Winston passed Mateen Cleaves' Big Ten record of 816 assists on January 17, in a win against Wisconsin. At the close of the regular season, Winston was named to the First Team All-Big Ten by the coaches and media. The remainder of the season was canceled due to the ongoing COVID-19 pandemic prior to any postseason tournaments being held. The Spartans were, at the time, considered a favorite to win the NCAA tournament. Winston averaged 18.3 points and 5.9 assists per game as a senior.

== Professional career ==
=== Washington Wizards (2020–2022) ===
On November 18, 2020, Winston was drafted by the Oklahoma City Thunder with the 53rd overall pick in the 2020 NBA draft. His rights were subsequently traded to the Washington Wizards and on November 28, 2020, he was signed to a two-way contract. However, since Washington's affiliate, the Capital City Go-Go withdrew from the tournament, he was assigned to the Erie BayHawks for the NBA G League season, making his debut on February 10, 2021.

On August 19, 2021, Winston signed a second two-way contract with the Wizards. He appeared in 7 games for the Wizards during the 2021–2022 regular season.

Winston joined the Philadelphia 76ers for the 2022 NBA Summer League.

=== Bayern Munich (2022–2023) ===
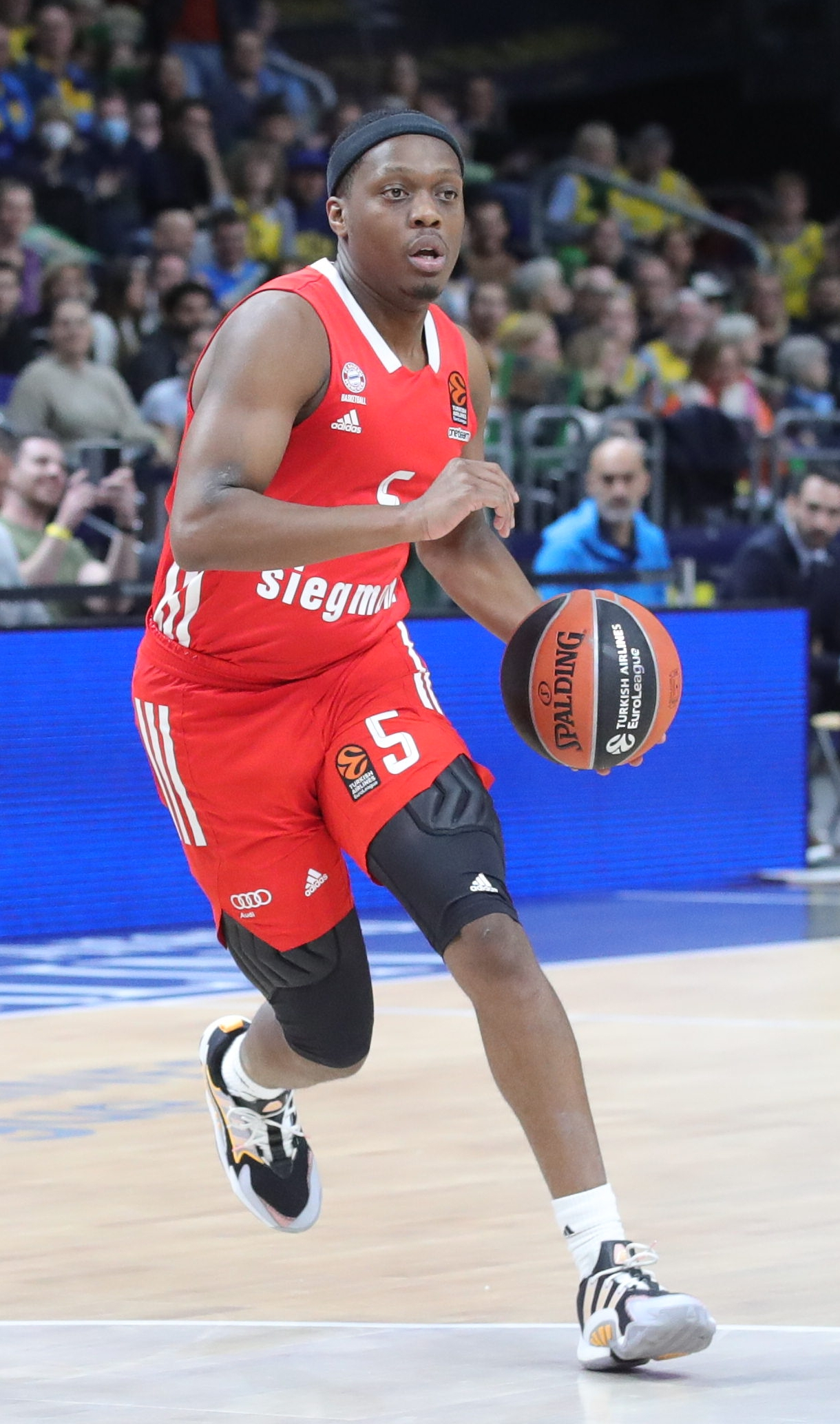
Winston in 2022

On July 28, 2022, Winston signed with German club Bayern Munich.

=== Tofaş (2023–2024) ===
On July 18, 2023, he signed with Tofaş of Basketbol Süper Ligi (BSL).

=== Pallacanestro Reggiana (2024–2025) ===
On July 19, 2024, Winston signed two-year deal with Pallacanestro Reggiana of the Italian Lega Basket Serie A (LBA).

=== Rytas Vilnius (2026–present) ===
On August 9, 2026, Winston signed with Rytas Vilnius of the Lithuanian Basketball League (LKL) and the Basketball Champions League (BCL).

== Career statistics ==
Legend
GP	Games played	GS	Games started	MPG	Minutes per game
FG%	Field goal percentage	3P%	3-point field goal percentage	FT%	Free throw percentage
RPG	Rebounds per game	APG	Assists per game	SPG	Steals per game
BPG	Blocks per game	PPG	Points per game	**Bold**	Career high

=== NBA ===
==== Regular season ====
Year	Team	GP	GS	MPG	FG%	3P%	FT%	RPG	APG	SPG	BPG	PPG
2020–21	Washington	**22**	0	4.5	**.424**	**.471**	.833	**.4**	.5	**.1**	.0	1.9
2021–22	Washington	7	0	**5.6**	.364	.333	**1.000**	.1	**1.0**	.0	.0	**2.0**
Career		29	0	4.7	.409	.435	.900	.3	.7	.1	.0	1.9

==== Playoffs ====
Year	Team	GP	GS	MPG	FG%	3P%	FT%	RPG	APG	SPG	BPG	PPG
2021	Washington	1	0	5.0	.333	.000	—	2.0	1.0	.0	.0	2.0
Career		1	0	5.0	.333	.000	—	2.0	1.0	.0	.0	2.0

=== College ===
Year	Team	GP	GS	MPG	FG%	3P%	FT%	RPG	APG	SPG	BPG	PPG
2016–17	Michigan State	35	5	20.7	.423	.380	.775	1.8	5.2	.7	**.1**	6.7
2017–18	Michigan State	35	34	28.1	**.507**	**.497**	**.900**	**3.4**	6.9	.7	**.1**	12.6
2018–19	Michigan State	**39**	**39**	**33.5**	.460	.398	.840	3.0	**7.5**	1.0	**.1**	**18.8**
2019–20	Michigan State	30	30	32.7	.448	.432	.852	2.5	5.9	**1.2**	.0	18.6
Career		139	108	28.8	.461	.430	.845	2.7	6.4	.9	.1	14.2

== Personal life ==
Winston has two younger brothers, Zachary and Khy, who played basketball at Albion College. On November 9, 2019, Zachary Winston was killed after being struck by a train, in an apparent suicide. Cassius played in a game the day after his brother's death, scoring 17 points and adding 11 assists in a blowout win. He received a standing ovation from the home crowd when he exited the game.

== See also ==
- List of NCAA Division I men's basketball career assists leaders
