= List of Men's Basketball Academic All-America Team Members of the Year =

Student athlete award

Men's Basketball Academic All-America Team Members of the Year
- Awarded for: The yearly outstanding men's college basketball Academic All-America team member
- Country: United States & Canada
- Presented by: College Sports Communicators

History
- Most recent: Tamin Lipsey, Iowa State; Jack Browder, Carson–Newman; Mason Dopirak, MSOE; Camerin James, Keiser
- Next ceremony: April 2027
- Website: academicallamerica.com

The Men's Basketball Academic All-America Team Member of the Year is the annually-awarded most outstanding singular college basketball male athlete selected for the Academic All-America Teams in a given year. The Academic All-America program is selected by the College Sports Communicators (formerly known as College Sports Information Directors of America, or CoSIDA), and recognizes combined athletic performance and academic achievement excellence of the nation's top student-athletes.

Men's basketball became the second sport with All-America team recognition in 1963. Since the 1987–88 academic year, All-America of the Year selections began with one winner each chosen from both the College and University Divisions for all All-America teams. Originally, the University Division team included eligible participants from National Collegiate Athletic Association (NCAA) Division I member schools, while the College Division team included scholar-athletes from all non-NCAA Division I institutions. Beginning in 2012, CoSIDA revamped its award structure. The University Division was renamed "Division I", and NCAA Division II and Division III were made their own separate All-American categories. The remaining schools initially still comprised the College Division. After the 2018 National Association of Intercollegiate Athletics (NAIA) division split off, the College Division was limited to two-year colleges, Canadian universities and Canadian colleges and institutions not affiliated with the NCAA or NAIA. A fifth Division with NAIA schools separate from Canadian and two-year member schools was announced with selections only in the At-large category. (Note: The College Division still exists within the CSC Academic All-America program, but awards are only presented in CSC's "at-large" category, encompassing sports in which the organization does not select a dedicated Academic All-America team. See CoSIDA's official calendar for announcement of its 2019–20 Academic All-America honorees.)

Currently, each team selects Academic All-District honorees in eight geographic districts across the United States and Canada. The districts are: District 1 (Connecticut, Maine, Massachusetts, New Hampshire, New York, Rhode Island, Vermont), District 2 (Delaware, District of Columbia, Kentucky, Maryland, New Jersey, Pennsylvania, West Virginia), District 3 (North Carolina, Tennessee, Virginia), District 4 (Alaska, Florida, Georgia, Puerto Rico, South Carolina), District 5 (Illinois, Indiana, Michigan, Ohio), District 6 (Arizona, Iowa, Louisiana, Minnesota, Mississippi, Montana, North Dakota, South Dakota, Wisconsin, Wyoming), District 7 (Colorado, Idaho, Kansas, Nebraska, Nevada, New Mexico, Oklahoma, Texas), and District 8 (Alaska, Arizona, California, Hawaii, Oregon, Utah, Washington, Canada). The All-District honorees make up the All-America team ballots. Currently, all twelve Academic All-American teams (men's and women's basketball, men's and women's soccer, men's and women's track & field, men's baseball, women's softball, men's American football, women's volleyball, men's and women's swimming & diving, men's and women's tennis and men's and women's at-large teams) have one Academic All-American of the Year per division. One of these twelve sport-by-sport Academic All-Americans of the year is selected as the Academic All-America Team Member of the Year for each division. The most recent men's basketball players to receive the all-sports honor are Cooper Cook of Nebraska Wesleyan University and Kyle Steigenga of Cornerstone University, respectively named in Division III and the former College Division in 2018.

== History ==
Two-time Winners

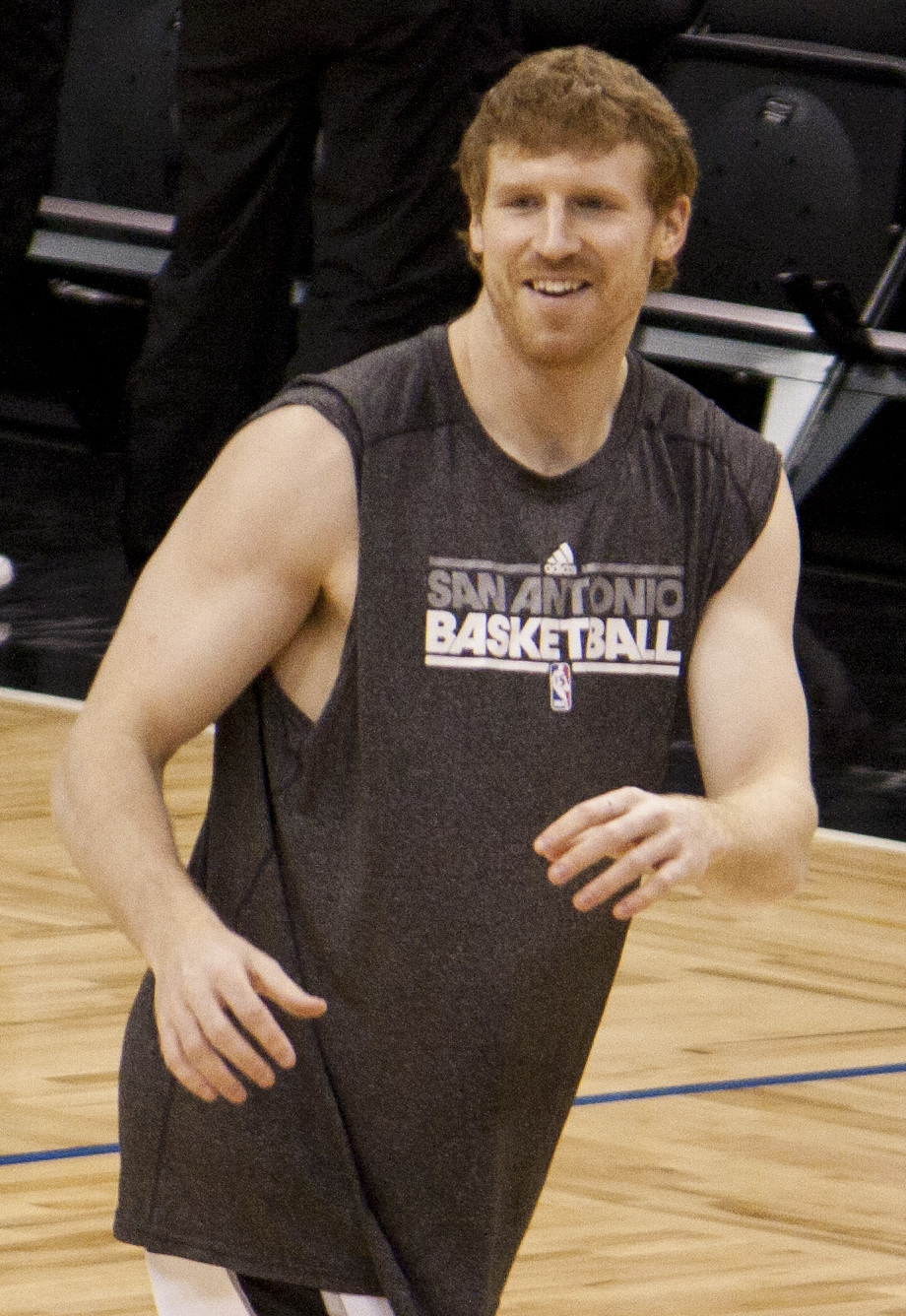
Matt Bonner (pictured in 2010), the 2002 and 2003 winner

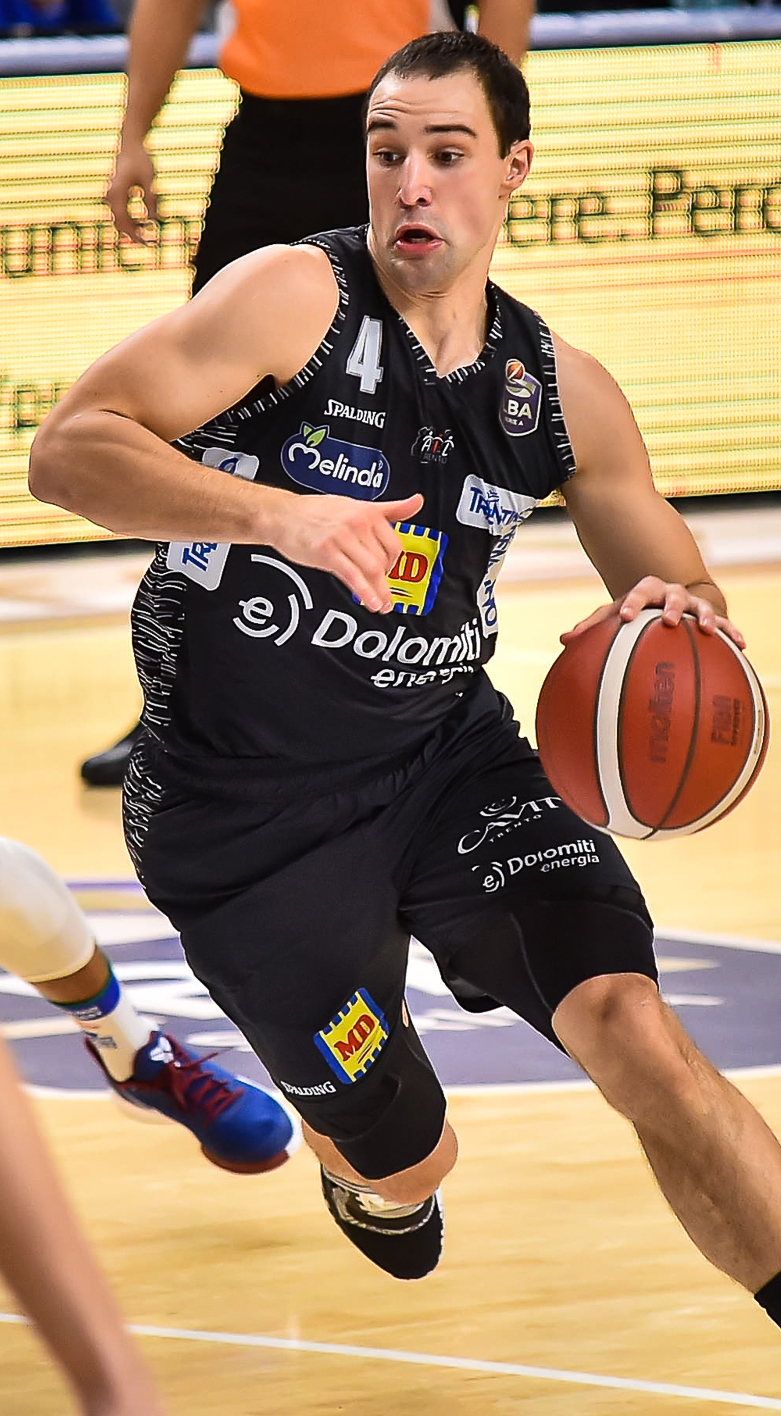
Aaron Craft (pictured in 2020), the 2013 and 2014 winner

As of January 31, 2024, Illinois Wesleyan University has had the most men's basketball Academic All-America honorees, and three Illinois Wesleyan Titans have been recognized with this award a total of four times.

Several of the Men's Basketball Academic All-America of the Year winners have gone on to win the overall Academic All-America of the Year. Michael Smith was the first University Division overall winner in 1988. Alec Kessler (1990), Todd Fuller (1996) and Emeka Okafor (2004) also won the University Division overall Academic All-America. Before the College Division was split, Korey Coon (2000) and Troy Ruths (2008) won the overall award. Since the split there have been no Division I or Division II overall winners. However, Colton Hunt (2013), John Coleman (2015) and Cooper Cook (2018) have won the Division III award. Kyle Steigenga (2018) has won the College Division award.

Several have been repeat winners of this award. Notably, Ben Vander Plas, the Division I recipient in 2022 and 2023, is the only repeat winner to have been honored at different schools—Ohio in 2022 and Virginia in 2023.

== Tables of winners ==
Overall Team Members of the Year

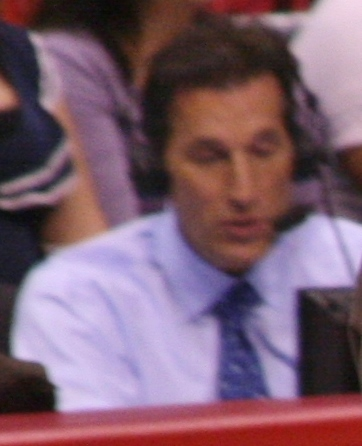
Michael Smith in 2011
1988 winner

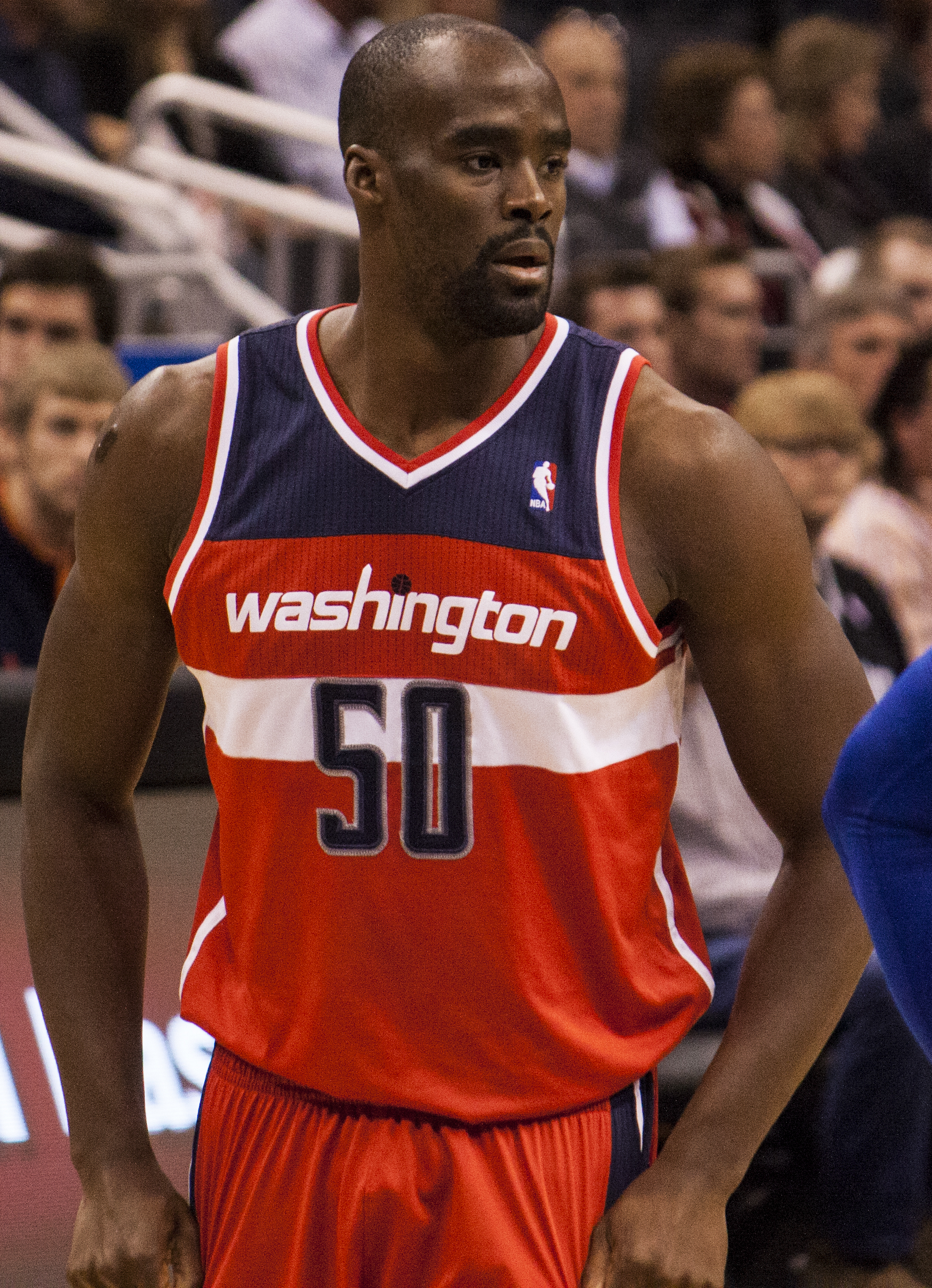
Emeka Okafor in 2012
2004 winner

Key
†	Indicates winners of the all-sports Academic All-America award.

All winners are American unless indicated otherwise.

=== Two-division era (1988–2011) ===
Men's Basketball Academic All-America Team Members of the Year (1988–2011)
Year	University Division		College Division	
Year	Winner	School	Winner	School
1988	Michael Smith†	Brigham Young	Brian Franson	Elon
1989	Alec Kessler	Georgia	Phil Hutcheson	Lipscomb
1990	Alec Kessler†	Georgia	Phil Hutcheson	Lipscomb
1991	Mike Iuzzolino	Saint Francis (PA)	Dan Nettleton	Wartburg
1992	Tony Bennett	Wisconsin–Green Bay	Jerry Meyer	Lipscomb
1993	Bruce Elder	Vanderbilt	Raymond Gutierezz	PennWest California
1994	Jeff Brown	Gonzaga	Chris Knoester	Calvin (MI)
1995	(United Kingdom) John Amaechi	Penn State Nittany Lions	Steve Diekmann	Grinnell
1996	Todd Fuller†	North Carolina State	Brett Beeson	Morehead State
1997	Jacque Vaughn	Kansas	James Fox	Case Western
1998	Pat Garrity	Notre Dame	Christopher Kiger	Elon
1999	Matt Sundblad	Lamar	Korey Coon	Illinois Wesleyan
2000	T. J. Lux	Northern Illinois	Korey Coon†	Illinois Wesleyan
2001	Shane Battier	Duke	Dave Jannuzzi	Wilkes
2002	Matt Bonner	Florida	Kevyn McBride	Alderson Broaddus
2003	Matt Bonner	Florida	J.T. Luginski	Michigan Tech
2004	Emeka Okafor†	UConn	Nick Branting	Nebraska–Kearney
2005	Chris Hill	Michigan State	J.D. Byers	Lebanon Valley
2006	(Germany) Johannes Herber	West Virginia	Keelan Amelianovich	Illinois Wesleyan
2007	Adam Haluska	Iowa	Alex Kock	Huntington (US)
2008	Adam Emmenecker	Drake	Troy Ruths†	Washington (MO)
2009	Brett Winkelman	North Dakota State	Jimmy Bartolotta	MIT
2010	Cole Aldrich	Kansas	Daniel McKeehan	Thomas More (KY)
2011	Matt Howard	Butler	Austin Meier	MSOE

=== Four-division era (2012–present) ===
Men's Basketball Academic All-America Team Members of the Year (2012–present)
Year	Division I		Division II		Division III		College/NAIA (Note: College Division, 2011–19; NAIA, 2018–present)	
Year	Winner	School	Winner	School	Winner	School	Winner	School
2012	Tyler Zeller	North Carolina	Nick Trull	Anderson (SC)	Aris Wurtz	Ripon (WI)	Casey Coons	Taylor (IN)
2013	Aaron Craft	Ohio State	Marcus Ruh	Saint Leo (FL)	Colton Hunt†	Randolph (VA)	Brad Karp	Saint Xavier (IL)
2014	Aaron Craft (2)	Ohio State	Bryce Foster	Missouri S&T	Richie Bonney	Hobart	Brad Karp	Saint Xavier (IL)
2015	Matt Townsend	Yale	Trey Casey	Christian Brothers	John Coleman†	Clarkson	Matt Schauss	Bethel (IN)
2016	Jarrod Uthoff	Iowa	Kyle Cooper	Hillsdale	Jared Holmquist	Trine	Brandon Cole	Bryan
2017	Canyon Barry	Florida	Adam Klie	UC San Diego	DeShawn Lowman	Neumann	Chandler Folkerts	Concordia (NE)
2018	Jevon Carter	West Virginia	Daniel Monteroso	West Liberty	Cooper Cook†	Nebraska Wesleyan	Kyle Steigenga†	Cornerstone
2019	Joe Sherburne	UMBC	Isaac Asrat	Lubbock Christian	Tim Roberts	MIT	Bart Hiscock	Hastings
2020	Skylar Mays	LSU	Peyton Wejnert	Pace	Marcus Dempsey	Muskingum	Nic Reed	Olivet Nazarene
2021	Corey Kispert	Gonzaga	Dalton Bolon	West Liberty	Gabriel Leifer	Yeshiva	Kyle Mangas	Indiana Wesleyan
2022	Ben Vander Plas	Ohio	Tyler Riemersma	Augustana (SD)	Matthew Leritz	Illinois Wesleyan	Alex Gross	Olivet Nazarene
2023	Ben Vander Plas (2)	Virginia	John Paul Kromka	Pitt-Johnstown	Josh Angle	Claremont McKenna (Note: The five undergraduate Claremont Colleges operate two athletic programs. Claremont McKenna teams with Harvey Mudd College and Scripps College to field sports teams as Claremont–Mudd–Scripps.)	Riley Minix	Southeastern (FL)
2024	Max Abmas	Texas	Erik Timko	Jefferson	Cael Schmitt	Coe	(England) Jonathan Brown	Cumberlands
2025	RJ Luis Jr.	St. John's	Jack Browder	Carson–Newman	Tate Ivanyo	Anderson (IN)	Drew Wyman	College of Idaho
2026	Tamin Lipsey	Iowa State	Jack Browder (2)	Carson–Newman	Mason Dopirak	MSOE	Camerin James	Keiser

== See also ==
- List of Academic All-America Team Members of the Year
